= Kerblam! =

2018 Doctor Who episode

283 – "Kerblam!"
- Doctor Who episode

Cast
- Doctor: Jodie Whittaker – Thirteenth Doctor
- Companions: Bradley Walsh – Graham O'Brien; Tosin Cole – Ryan Sinclair; Mandip Gill – Yasmin Khan
- Others: Julie Hesmondhalgh – Judy Maddox; Lee Mack – Dan Cooper; Callum Dixon – Jarva Slade; Claudia Jessie – Kira Arlo; Leo Flanagan – Charlie Duffy; Matthew Gravelle – Voice of Kerblam

Production
- Directed by: Jennifer Perrott
- Written by: Pete McTighe
- Produced by: Nikki Wilson
- Executive producers: Chris Chibnall; Matt Strevens; Sam Hoyle
- Music by: Segun Akinola
- Series: Series 11
- Running time: 49 minutes
- First broadcast: 18 November 2018

Chronology
← Preceded by "Demons of the Punjab"	Followed by → "The Witchfinders"

"Kerblam!" is the seventh episode of the eleventh series of the British science fiction television programme Doctor Who. It was written by Pete McTighe, directed by Jennifer Perrott, and was first broadcast on BBC One on 18 November 2018.

In the episode, the Thirteenth Doctor (Jodie Whittaker) travels to the delivery company Kerblam, alongside her companions Graham O'Brien (Bradley Walsh), Ryan Sinclair (Tosin Cole), and Yasmin Khan (Mandip Gill), to investigate why a package sent to her contained a message asking for help. They soon discover the company has missing human employees and that the automated workforce is behaving oddly. The episode guest stars Julie Hesmondhalgh, Lee Mack, Callum Dixon, Claudia Jessie, Leo Flanagan, and Matthew Gravelle.

The episode was watched by 7.46 million viewers.

== Plot ==
The Thirteenth Doctor and her companions travel to Kerblam!, a galaxy-wide online shopping service consisting of automated warehouses and a mostly robotic workforce known as "TeamMates". Under the guise of being new employees, the group attempt to find out who sent them a delivery with a call for help. They quickly learn from their new colleagues – Dan Cooper, the company's poster boy; Kira Arlo, a member of the dispatch team; and Charlie Duffy, a maintenance worker who loves Kira – that staff have been vanishing in recent months, and that the company has a strong culture of productivity. When Dan disappears while finding an order, the Doctor suspects something is wrong with the company's artificial intelligence and automated workforce.

Both human resource managers Judy Maddox and Jarva Slade quickly deny involvement when confronted about the disappearances. When Kira is abducted, the Doctor tracks her to the completely automated packaging and delivery floor, leading the group to gain access below. After finding the remains of the missing workforce and an army of TeamMates holding packages, the Doctor uses an early model of TeamMate to speak with Kerblam's AI. She quickly learns it called for her help directly, after suspecting something was wrong with its workforce. When Yasmin, Ryan and Charlie reveal they had witnessed Kira die when playing with bubble wrap, the Doctor discovers someone had weaponised the material, intending for it to be used upon Kerblam's customers.

Charlie quickly admits to being the culprit, explaining that Kira's death was not part of his plans. He reveals his motive was to prevent rampant automation making human workforces redundant. Gaining access to the company, Charlie used the missing staff as test subjects for his weaponised bubble wrap. He intended to use it upon the company's customers, knowing blame for the sudden deaths would be placed upon automation and a lack of human diligence. Realising the company's AI killed Kira to make Charlie understand the severity of his actions, the Doctor reprograms the TeamMates to deliver to themselves and pop the wrap. While the others leave, Charlie remains and is killed in the floor's destruction. In the wake of the incident, Maddox and Slade undertake to rebuild Kerblam with a mostly human workforce.

=== Continuity ===
At the beginning of the episode, the TARDIS receives a delivery of a fez, which the Doctor remarks she cannot remember ordering and must have ordered a "while back", before trying it on and asking her companions if it is "still me". The Eleventh Doctor, who presumably placed the order, had a notable fondness for fezzes, proclaiming them to be "cool" in "The Big Bang".

Towards the end of the episode, the Doctor uses her "Venusian Aikido" technique to paralyze Slade, which she had previously used to paralyze Epzo in "The Ghost Monument". Venusian Aikido was also used by the Third Doctor and Twelfth Doctor.

Later on, the Doctor says "Oh, talking of wasps, did I ever tell you about me and Agatha Christie?" alluding to the episode "The Unicorn and the Wasp", in which the Tenth Doctor meets the author in circumstances involving a Vespiform, an alien that resembles a giant wasp.

== Production ==
Work on the exterior and interior scenes of "Kerblam!" were conducted in the UK and overseen by Australian director Jennifer Perrott, who helped with production of the fifth episode "The Tsuranga Conundrum".

== Broadcast and reception ==
Professional ratings
Aggregate scores
Source	Rating
Rotten Tomatoes (Average Score)	7.62
Rotten Tomatoes (Tomatometer)	90%
Review scores
Source	Rating
Daily Mirror	4/5 stars
Metro	3/5 stars
New York Magazine	3/5 stars
Radio Times	4/5 stars
The A.V. Club	B+
The Telegraph	3/5 stars
The Independent	4/5 stars
TV Fanatic	4.5/5 stars

=== Promotion ===
Prior to the episode being broadcast, a preview of its opening scenes was shown during the Children in Need telethon on 16 November 2018.

=== Ratings ===
"Kerblam!" was watched by 5.93 million viewers overnight, a share of 28.5% of the total United Kingdom TV audience, making it the fourth-highest overnight viewership for the night and the tenth-highest overnight viewership for the week on overnights across all UK channels. It received an official total of 7.46 million viewers across all UK channels, making it the ninth most watched programme of the week, and had an Audience Appreciation Index score of 81.

=== Critical reception ===
Rotten Tomatoes gave the episode an approval rating of 90%, based on 30 critics, and an average score of 7.62/10. The critical consensus states "Adorable automatons, educational undertones, and an everyday object turned horrifying monster make 'Kerblam!' a fun, fear-inducing callback to earlier iterations of Doctor Who."

Several reviewers suggest that the design of the fictional Kerblam company satirises both the retailer Amazon.com and online shopping.

== In print ==
Kerblam!
- Author: Pete McTighe
- Series: Doctor Who book: Target novelisations
- Publisher: BBC Books
- Publication date: 13 July 2023
- ISBN: 9781785948237

A Target Novelisation of this story, written by Pete McTighe, was announced on 19 January 2023, to be released in July.
