= Spyfall (Doctor Who) =

288 – "Spyfall"
- Doctor Who episodes

Cast
- Doctor: Jodie Whittaker – Thirteenth Doctor
- Companions: Bradley Walsh – Graham O'Brien; Tosin Cole – Ryan Sinclair; Mandip Gill – Yasmin Khan
- Others: Sacha Dhawan – O / The Master; Lenny Henry – Daniel Barton; Stephen Fry – C; Shobna Gulati – Najia Khan; Ravin J Ganatra – Hakim Khan; Bhavnisha Parmar – Sonya Khan; Melissa De Vries – Sniper; Sacharissa Claxton – Passenger; William Ely – Older Passenger; Brian Law – Operative (US); Buom Tihngang – Tibo; Asif Khan – Sergent Ramesh Sunder; Andrew Bone – Mr Collins; Ronan Summers – Rendition Man; Christopher McArthur – Ethan; Darron Meyer – Seesay; Dominique Maher – Browning; Struan Rodger – Voice of Kasaavin; Sylvie Briggs – Ada Lovelace; Aurora Marion – Noor Inayat Khan; Mark Dexter – Charles Babbage; Andrew Piper (Note: Miscredited as "Andrew Pipe" in "Spyfall, Part Two") – Inventor; Tom Ashley – Airport Worker; Kenneth Joy – Perkins; Blanche Williams – Barton's Mother

Production
- Directed by: Jamie Magnus Stone; Lee Haven Jones
- Written by: Chris Chibnall
- Produced by: Nikki Wilson; Alex Mercer
- Executive producers: Chris Chibnall; Matt Strevens
- Music by: Segun Akinola
- Series: Series 12
- Running time: 2 episodes, 59 and 60 minutes
- First broadcast: 1 January 2020
- Last broadcast: 5 January 2020

Chronology
| ← Preceded by "Resolution" | Followed by → "Orphan 55" |

"Spyfall" is the two-part premiere of the twelfth series of the British science fiction television programme Doctor Who, first broadcast on BBC One on 1 and 5 January 2020. It was written by showrunner and executive producer Chris Chibnall. The first episode was directed by Jamie Magnus Stone, and the second by Lee Haven Jones.

In the episodes, the Thirteenth Doctor (Jodie Whittaker) and her companions Graham O'Brien (Bradley Walsh), Ryan Sinclair (Tosin Cole), and Yasmin Khan (Mandip Gill) are enlisted by MI6 to investigate a former agent and an alien threat. The episodes mark the return of both the Master and Gallifrey, last seen in "The Doctor Falls" (2017) and "Hell Bent" (2015), respectively.

The two episodes were watched by 6.89 and 6.07 million viewers respectively, and received generally positive reviews from critics. Part One is dedicated to former Doctor Who writer and script editor Terrance Dicks, who had died in 2019.

== Plot ==
=== Part One ===
Following attacks on intelligence agents around the world, the Doctor, Yaz, Graham, and Ryan are called in by the head of MI6, C, to investigate. The victims' DNA has been altered into something extraterrestrial. Their only lead is Daniel Barton, the CEO of the search engine media company, VOR. Additionally, the Doctor contacts Agent O, who was tasked with monitoring extraterrestrial activities before being struck off by C. C is killed by mysterious lifeforms, while the Doctor and her companions manage to escape.

While Yaz and Ryan investigate Barton (whose DNA they discover to be 93% human), who invites them to his birthday party the following day, Graham and the Doctor find O in the Australian outback. In their separate investigations, both groups encounter the same luminescent alien entities, who appear to be cooperating with Barton. In Australia, the Doctor is able to capture one of the lifeforms, who reveals their intent to occupy the universe. While sneaking into VOR's headquarters with Ryan, Yaz is attacked by one such entity and transported to a strange environment. The captured alien frees itself by swapping with Yaz, leaving her in O's base. Ryan is brought to Australia and regroups with Yaz, Graham and the Doctor.

Joined by O, the four investigate Barton at his birthday party. After being confronted by the Doctor, Barton denies all accusations put to him and angrily leaves in his car. The Doctor and her companions pursue Barton on motorbikes to his private jet. Leaping aboard said jet, O is revealed to be the Master – having been in control of Barton and the aliens the whole time. Barton then disappears from the pilot seat, leaving a bomb in his place. The Master says to the Doctor, "One thing I should tell you in the seconds before you die: Everything that you think you know, is a lie". The device detonates, shattering the nose of the plane and sending it into a nose dive. The Master teleports to his waiting TARDIS and two of the aliens cause the Doctor to disappear from the plane, reappearing in the same environment Yaz was in earlier; leaving the others in the falling plane.

=== Part Two ===
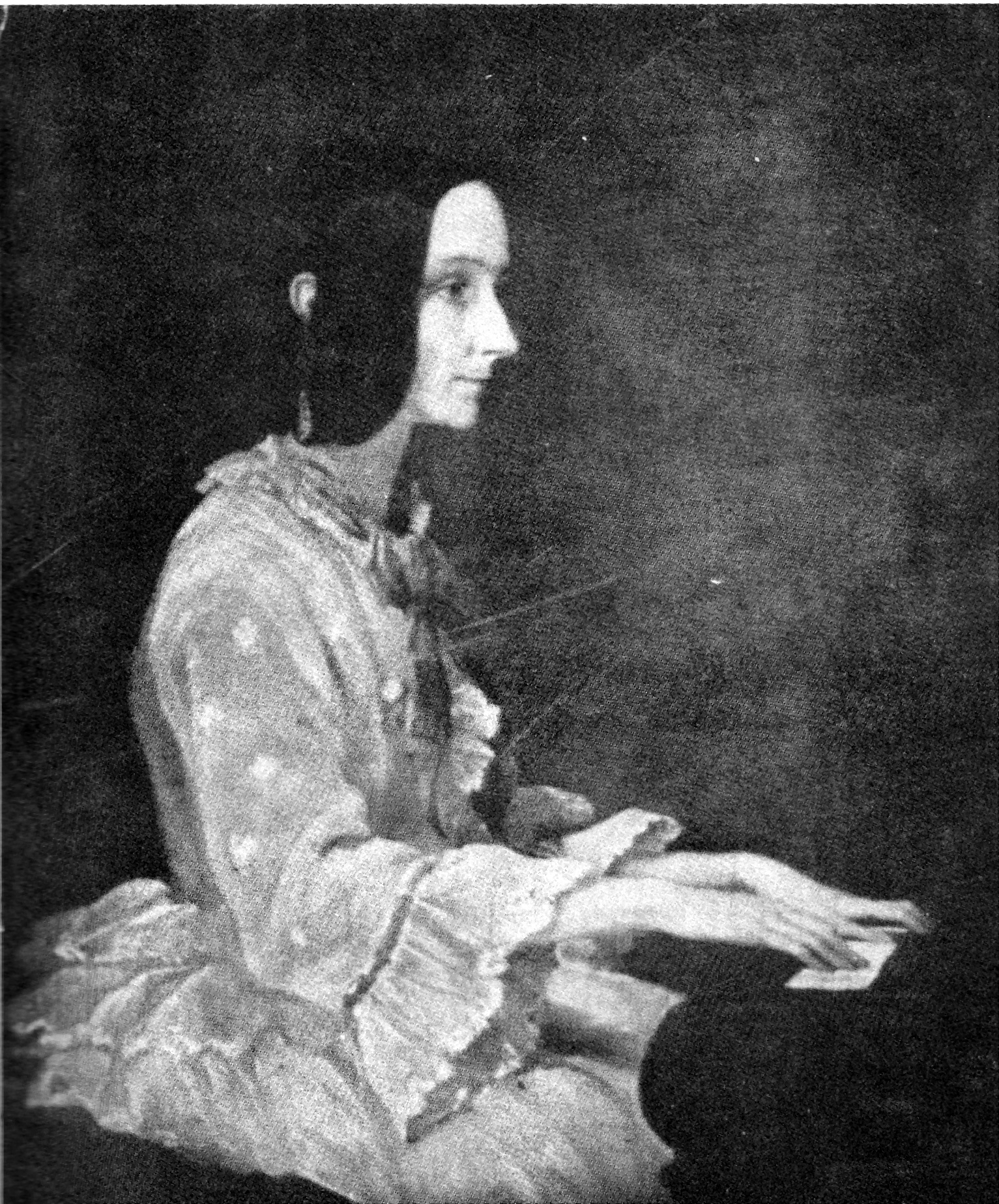
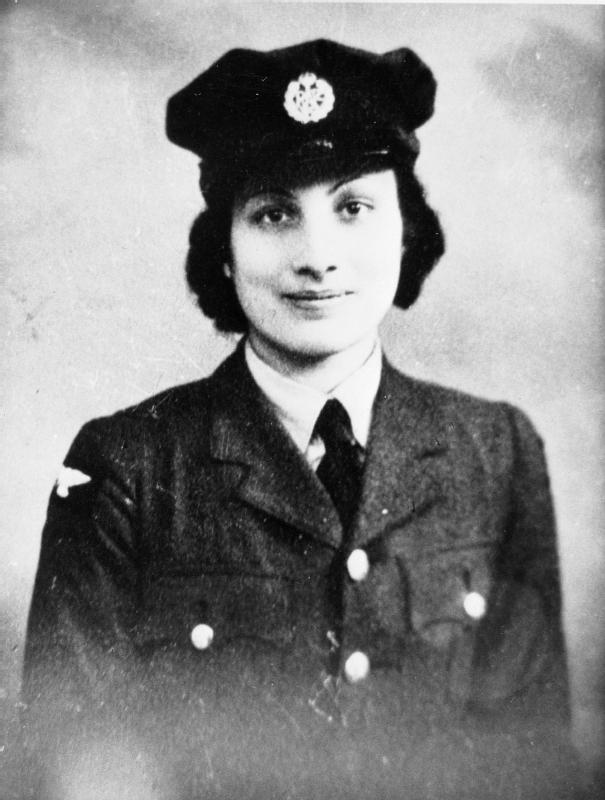
Part Two features the historical figures Ada Lovelace (left) and Noor Inayat Khan.

In the dimension of the aliens, now revealed to be Kasaavins, the Doctor meets computer pioneer Ada Lovelace and grabs her hand when a Kasaavin appears, transporting them to an invention exhibition in 1834, where they encounter the Master. Though the Master knows the aliens' name and intentions, the Doctor realises he does not fully understand them when he asks her how she escaped their dimension. Ada takes her to the residence of polymath Charles Babbage, where the Doctor summons a Kasaavin via a figurine identical to the one in Barton's office, hoping to return to the 21st century. Ada suddenly grabs the Doctor's hand as she fades and they accidentally travel to Paris during World War II instead. They are rescued by British spy Noor Inayat Khan, though the Master continues to pursue them, posing as a Nazi officer through the use of a perception filter. The Doctor meets with the Master atop the Eiffel Tower, where the latter reveals that he had the Kasaavins kill spies in order to get the former's attention and claims that Gallifrey has been destroyed. With help from Ada and Noor, the Doctor destroys the Master's filter and turns the Nazis on him while her group uses his TARDIS to return to the present.

Back in the present, Ryan finds instructions to safely land the plane with help from a recording of the Doctor. By the time the companions land, Barton and The Master has branded them persons of interest, setting off a worldwide manhunt for them. Despite this, they manage to steal one of Barton's cars, which takes them to a warehouse containing the figurine. Speaking at a conference, Barton reveals that the Kasaavins will rewrite humanity's DNA to utilise its storage capacity as hard drives. The Master, forced to live through the 20th century without his TARDIS, arrives in time to see the figurine device activate, only for it to fail after the Doctor planted a virus in it in the past. Just before the Kasaavins are forced back to their dimension, the Doctor exposes the Master's treachery and they take him with them while Barton escapes from the conference.

After setting up the means for her companions to survive the plane crash, the Doctor returns Ada and Noor to their respective time periods and wipes herself from their memories. She also visits Gallifrey's ruins to confirm the Master's claim, where she discovers a recording of him confessing to destroying their home planet after realising their understanding of Time Lord history was a lie based on the "Timeless Child." Afterwards, her companions bluntly request the Doctor explain who she is, so she tells them of what she believes to be her backstory.

=== Continuity ===
"The Timeless Child" had been mentioned briefly in the previous series' episode "The Ghost Monument", where the Remnants taunted the Doctor about her knowledge of the Child.

== Production ==
=== Development ===
"Spyfall" was written by showrunner and executive producer Chris Chibnall. It is the first two-part episode not to use separate titles for its episodes since "The End of Time" (2009–10).

Part One is dedicated to former Doctor Who writer and script editor Terrance Dicks, who died in August 2019. Dicks co-created the character of the Master, as alluded to in his dedication.

=== Casting ===
The episode sees the return of Jodie Whittaker as the Thirteenth Doctor for her second full series. Bradley Walsh, Tosin Cole and Mandip Gill also reprise their roles as Graham O'Brien, Ryan Sinclair and Yasmin Khan, respectively.

Lenny Henry and Stephen Fry were cast in the two-part story, with Henry portraying Daniel Barton, and Stephen Fry as C, the head of MI6.

Sacha Dhawan made an unannounced appearance as The Master, who had supplanted an MI6 agent codenamed O. Dhawan previously portrayed Waris Hussein, the director of the very first Doctor Who serial, in the 2013 docudrama An Adventure in Space and Time. Dhawan said he had been notified of the role in January 2019, about a week before filming began in South Africa. At the time he was working with Peter Capaldi, the actor who had played the previous incarnation of the Doctor, on a scripted play. Dhawan had found it hard to keep a straight face in front of Capaldi since he had to keep his role secret.

=== Filming ===
Jamie Magnus Stone, who previously directed the fiftieth-anniversary minisode "The Last Day", directed the first block, which comprised the first and fifth episodes of the series. Filming commenced on 23 January 2019. Lee Haven Jones directed the second block, which comprised the second and third episodes. Multiple countries were portrayed whilst filming in South Africa.

== Release ==
The first part of "Spyfall" aired on 1 January 2020, with the second part moving to Doctor Who's regular Sunday timeslot on 5 January 2020. Both parts were released in cinemas in the United States on 5 January 2020.

Professional ratings
Part One
Aggregate scores
| Source | Rating |
|---|---|
| Rotten Tomatoes (Tomatometer) | 93% |
| Rotten Tomatoes (Average Score) | 7.54/10 |
Review scores
| Source | Rating |
| The A.V. Club | B+ |
| Entertainment Weekly | B− |
| Radio Times | 4/5 stars |
| The Guardian | 4/5 stars |
| The Independent | 4/5 stars |
| The Telegraph | 3/5 stars |

Professional ratings
Part Two
Aggregate scores
| Source | Rating |
|---|---|
| Rotten Tomatoes (Tomatometer) | 82% |
| Rotten Tomatoes (Average Score) | 7.18/10 |
Review scores
| Source | Rating |
| The A.V. Club | B+ |
| Entertainment Weekly | B− |
| Radio Times | 3/5 stars |
| The Independent | 4/5 stars |
| The Telegraph | 4/5 stars |

=== Ratings ===
"Spyfall, Part One" was watched by 4.88 million viewers overnight, making it the second most watched programme for the day in the United Kingdom. The first episode had an Audience Appreciation Index score of 82. "Spyfall, Part Two" was watched by 4.60 million viewers overnight, losing to ITV's Dancing on Ice. The second episode also had an Audience Appreciation Index score of 82.

The two episodes received an official total of 6.89 and 6.07 million viewers across all UK channels respectively.

=== Critical reception ===
The first episode holds an approval rating of 93% on Rotten Tomatoes, and an average of 7.54/10 based on 27 reviews. The website's critical consensus reads, "A fresh suit, new faces, and some exciting espionage are fun enough, but the Spyfall, Part 1's final moments inspire hope for an absolutely epic new season of Doctor Who."

The second episode holds an approval rating of 82% on Rotten Tomatoes, and an average of 7.18/10 based on 17 reviews. The website's critical consensus reads, "While definitely a welcome showcase of all that Whittaker's Doctor has to offer, Spyfall, Part 2's descent into well-trodden Doctor Who lore can't help but feel like a step back."
