= The Witchfinders =

284 – "The Witchfinders"
- Doctor Who episode

Cast
- Doctor: Jodie Whittaker – Thirteenth Doctor
- Companions: Bradley Walsh – Graham O'Brien; Tosin Cole – Ryan Sinclair; Mandip Gill – Yasmin Khan
- Others: Alan Cumming – King James; Siobhan Finneran – Becka Savage; Tilly Steele – Willa Twiston; Tricia Kelly – Old Mother Twiston; Arthur Kay – Smithy; Stavros Demetraki – Alfonso

Production
- Directed by: Sallie Aprahamian
- Written by: Joy Wilkinson
- Produced by: Alex Mercer
- Executive producers: Chris Chibnall; Matt Strevens; Sam Hoyle
- Music by: Segun Akinola
- Series: Series 11
- Running time: 47 minutes
- First broadcast: 25 November 2018

Chronology
← Preceded by "Kerblam!"	Followed by → "It Takes You Away"

"The Witchfinders" is the eighth episode of the eleventh series of the British science fiction television programme Doctor Who. It was written by Joy Wilkinson and directed by Sallie Aprahamian, and was first broadcast on BBC One on 25 November 2018.

In the episode, the Thirteenth Doctor (Jodie Whittaker) travels to 17th century Lancashire, alongside her companions Graham O'Brien (Bradley Walsh), Ryan Sinclair (Tosin Cole), and Yasmin Khan (Mandip Gill), finding themselves in the middle of a witch hunt held by a local land owner.

The episode was watched by 7.21 million viewers, and received generally positive reviews from critics.

== Plot ==
The Thirteenth Doctor and her companions arrive in 1612 Lancashire near Pendle Hill. At a nearby village they find an old woman accused of witchcraft being dunked, and the Doctor tries to save her, but fails. She attempts to prevent further trials by pretending to be the Witchfinder General, fooling landowner and magistrate Becka Savage. King James arrives, complicating matters, as he assumes she is Graham's assistant. Meanwhile, Yasmin finds the old woman being buried by her grand-daughter, Willa Twiston, who is also Becka's cousin, and saves her from a tendril made of mud. The Doctor realises the cause of the witch hunt is of alien origin when recent victims begin to reanimate.

While her companions follow the reanimated corpses, the Doctor is accused of witchcraft when confronting Becka over her hiding something. The Doctor attempts to reason with James before being dunked, escaping from her bonds underwater. Afterwards she notes how Becka could not bear touching the tree used to dunk her. As her reanimated victims approach, Becka reveals that she was infected by an alien entity while chopping down the tree atop the Hill. Becka started the witch trials hoping to find a cure.

An alien entity takes over Becka's body. Speaking through her, the entity reveals herself to be queen of a race called the Morax. The tree Becka chopped down is in fact a disguised alien prison keeping the Morax war criminals within, its systems now damaged and malfunctioning. The escaping Morax intend that their king possess James and conquer Earth. The Doctor uses parts of the tree to save James and restore the prison systems. While the other Morax are forced out of their host bodies, the queen refuses to leave Becka's body. James kills them both. The following day, James tells the Doctor that all records of the events will be erased before he and Willa watch in surprise as the group leave in the TARDIS.

=== Continuity ===
Towards the end of the episode, when entering the TARDIS, the Doctor says "A brilliant man once said, 'any sufficiently advanced technology is indistinguishable from magic.'" This is a reference to the third of British science fiction writer Arthur C. Clarke's three laws, which was also referenced by the Seventh Doctor and his companion Ace in the serial Battlefield, Captain Jack Harkness in the Torchwood episode "Immortal Sins," and to a degree by the Twelfth Doctor in the episode "The Girl Who Died."

=== Outside reference ===
Towards the end of the episode, when warning King James not to resume the witch trials, Graham partially quotes Quentin Tarantino's version of biblical verse Ezekiel 25:17, from his film Pulp Fiction.

=== Historical reference ===
When King James and Ryan talk in the forest, King James explained that his mother (Mary Queen of Scots) killed his father, a reference to the historical speculation.

== Production ==
Exterior scenes for "The Witchfinders" were filmed around Wales, and within Gosport, England, at the 17th century living museum of Little Woodham. Filming for the episode took place during February 2018. The episode was the second Doctor Who story directed and written by a woman, following Enlightenment (1983).

In a 2021 interview, Wilkinson revealed the story had changed several times during development, beginning as more centered around the actual Pendle Witches, with King James being a later addition. The script had the working title of Daemonologie.

== Broadcast and reception ==
Professional ratings
Aggregate scores
Source	Rating
Rotten Tomatoes (Average Score)	7.54
Rotten Tomatoes (Tomatometer)	85%
Review scores
Source	Rating
Entertainment Weekly	B+
Daily Mirror	4/5 stars
Metro	4/5 stars
New York Magazine	5/5 stars
Radio Times	2/5 stars
The A.V. Club	B+
The Telegraph	4/5 stars
The Independent	4/5 stars
TV Fanatic	4/5 stars

=== Early release ===
The episode was released to Amazon Prime subscribers three days before its BBC One broadcast, when the streaming service accidentally uploaded "The Witchfinders" to the slot for the seventh episode, "Kerblam!", instead of the seventh episode itself.

=== Ratings ===
"The Witchfinders" was watched by 5.66 million viewers overnight, a share of 27.9% of the total United Kingdom TV audience, making it the fourth-highest overnight viewership for the night and the nineteenth-highest overnight viewership for the week on overnights across all UK channels. It received an official total of 7.21 million viewers across all UK channels, making it the 17th most watched programme of the week, and had an Audience Appreciation Index score of 81.

=== Critical response ===
The episode was met with positive reviews, and Cumming's performance received praise. It holds an approval rating of 85% based on 27 reviews, and an average score of 7.54/10 on Rotten Tomatoes. The website's critical consensus reads, "'The Witchfinders' sparks excitement by highlighting familiar themes of Doctor Who's current season — and ignites that spark with a dramatic shift in focus."

== Commercial releases ==
=== In print ===
The Witchfinders
- Author: Joy Wilkinson
- Cover artist: Anthony Dry
- Series: Doctor Who book: Target novelisations
- Publisher: BBC Books
- Publication date: 11 March 2021
- ISBN: 978-1-785-94502-1

A novelisation of this story written by Joy Wilkinson was released in paperback and digital formats 11 March 2021 as part of the Target Collection.

== See also ==
- Lancashire Witches Walk
- Daemonologie, written by King James I
- Pendle witches
