= Demons of the Punjab =

Episode of British TV show Doctor Who

282 – "Demons of the Punjab"
- Doctor Who episode

Cast
- Doctor: Jodie Whittaker – Thirteenth Doctor
- Companions: Bradley Walsh – Graham O'Brien; Tosin Cole – Ryan Sinclair; Mandip Gill – Yasmin Khan
- Others: Leena Dhingra – Nani Umbreen; Amita Suman – Umbreen; Shane Zaza – Prem; Hamza Jeetooa – Manish; Shaheen Khan – Hasna; Shobna Gulati – Najia; Ravin J. Ganatra – Hakim; Bhavnisha Parmar – Sonya; Emma Fielding – Voice of Kisar; Nathalie Curzner – Performance of Kisar; Isobel Middleton – Voice of Almak; Barbara Fadden – Performance of Almak

Production
- Directed by: Jamie Childs
- Written by: Vinay Patel
- Produced by: Alex Mercer
- Executive producers: Chris Chibnall; Matt Strevens; Sam Hoyle
- Music by: Segun Akinola
- Series: Series 11
- Running time: 50 minutes
- First broadcast: 11 November 2018

Chronology
← Preceded by "The Tsuranga Conundrum"	Followed by → "Kerblam!"

"Demons of the Punjab" is the sixth episode of the eleventh series of the British science fiction television programme Doctor Who. It was written by Vinay Patel, directed by Jamie Childs, and first broadcast on BBC One on 11 November 2018.

In the episode, Yasmin Khan asks the Thirteenth Doctor to take her to see her grandmother during her youth. Along with the other companions Graham O'Brien and Ryan Sinclair, they get caught up in the events preceding the partition of India; meanwhile, the Doctor also investigates if aliens are involved in the death of a man killed during their visit. The episode was watched by 7.48 million viewers in the UK during the week following its release, and was met with positive reviews from critics.

== Plot ==
While celebrating the birthday of her grandmother Umbreen, Yaz receives a broken watch from her. Curious over its origins, Yasmin convinces a hesitant Thirteenth Doctor to take her, Graham and Ryan to see her while she was young. Arriving in northern Punjab in August 1947, Yasmin learns that the watch's previous owner was a Hindu man named Prem, whom a younger Umbreen intends to marry despite her family being Muslim; Yaz also knows that Prem is definitely not her grandfather. The Doctor notes that the group have arrived on 17 August, the day of the finalisation of the borders for the partition of India across religious lines.

Matters become complicated when the group see two aliens, that the Doctor had brief visions of when they arrived, over the body of the wedding's overseer sadhu Bhakti. The group are joined by Prem, who saw the aliens around the time of his older brother's death during his military service in World War II. The Doctor assumes the aliens killed Bhakti, and eventually recognises them as members of the Thijarian, a race of assassins, when she finds their ship.

Stealing a capsule from them, she tries to investigate the events; the preparations for the wedding continue, though Prem's younger brother Manish strongly opposes the inter-faith marriage. The Doctor enters the Thijarian ship once again, and learns that the two Thijarians are not assassins anymore, and the last of their kind; the capsule holds what remains of their people, and the two have dedicated themselves to commemorate those who die alone. After revealing that Prem will become a casualty of the partition they intend to witness, the Thijarians agree to show the Doctor a recording of Bhakti's death. The footage reveals Bhakti was murdered by Manish.

Returning to the others and convinced by Yasmin to see the event through, the Doctor oversees the marriage ceremony. The group witnesses the watch being accidentally broken, but Umbreen cherishes its significance as commemorating their moment in time. When the Doctor later accosts Manish for Bhakti's murder, he reveals to have contacted a small group of armed Hindu nationalists to attack the wedding reception. Prem convinces Umbreen and her mother to escape with the Doctor's group; he remains behind to reason with Manish, and dies when the nationalists shoot him while the Thijarians observe. Back in the present, Yasmin's grandmother comments on her granddaughter's new henna.

== Production ==
=== Development ===
Vinay Patel, the writer of the episode, had his first meeting with showrunner Chris Chibnall in early 2016; he decided that something set during the partition of India would be his top pick for a story, a period Chibnall also wanted to look at. Observing the direction Chibnall wanted to take his incarnation of the show in, he decided to write a story with compassion running through the middle. He wrote all the elements of the story to have a thematic similarity to the human concerns inherent to the partition, such as death and loss.

Shane Zaza, Hamza Jeetooa, and Amita Suman were announced, shortly after the premier of the series, to be among a number of guest actors that would appear in the series. They played Prem, Manish, and young Umbreen respectively in the episode.

=== Writing ===
Patel decided to do extensive research before writing the story, instead of just relying on his basic knowledge, to properly approach the story with "dignity, truth and respect"; he read both academic sources as well as narrativised histories of the partition. He said that because there was an idea of who the companions would be early on, part of him is injected into Yaz, with both their senses of self influenced by the past of their forbears. He stated that he was aiming to create something that looked back at the lives of a generation "slowly disappearing from the world"; he took some inspiration from his own family's history, but mostly wrote from the creative perspective of someone trying to show parts of history. He also stated that he wanted to provoke something about the unheard experiences of different people in viewers.

=== Filming and music ===
The episode was filmed in the Granada province of Spain. Patel was present at the location shoot, which he said took weeks. Segun Akinola's soundtrack made use of instruments such as the tabla and shehnai, performed by musicians of South Asian descent. Akinola also created a new arrangement of the closing theme after the style of Punjabi music, performed by Kuljit Bahmra, Surjeet Singh, and singer Shahid Abbas Khan. The recording of the soundtrack took place at Abbey Road Studios.

== Broadcast and reception ==
Professional ratings
Aggregate scores
Source	Rating
Rotten Tomatoes (Average Score)	8.0
Rotten Tomatoes (Tomatometer)	90%
Review scores
Source	Rating
Entertainment Weekly	B+
Daily Mirror	4/5 stars
Radio Times	3/5 stars
The A.V. Club	B+
The Telegraph	3/5 stars
TV Fanatic	4/5 stars
Vulture	5/5 stars

"Demons of the Punjab" is the sixth episode of the eleventh series. It was broadcast for the first time on 11 November 2018 on BBC One. The episode received an official weekly total of 7.48 million viewers across all UK channels for the week 12–18 November, making it the eighth most watched programme of the week, and had an Audience Appreciation Index score of 80. A corresponding behind-the-scenes episode of Doctor Who Access All Areas was released on 15 November 2018.

=== Critical reception ===
"Demons of the Punjab" received positive reviews. On Rotten Tomatoes, it has an approval rating of 90%, based on 30 reviews, and an average score of 8.0/10. The critical consensus reads, "'Demons of Punjab' focuses on family and progress, solidifying the cohesive thematic stamp this season is making upon the greater series." Praise was given to Patel and the way he showed both the big as well as the personal perspectives to the partition; the soundtrack was also praised, with one review calling the "Indian makeover of the theme tune" a delight in particular. Some reviewers found it to have similar flaws to other episodes of the series, in particular the underuse of the guest cast.

Writing for Vulture, Ross Ruediger gave the episode five out of five, calling it "exceptional Doctor Who on pretty much every level," and praising director Jamie Childs and the production team for "delivering something so engaging and adult and educational." Writing for Digital Spy, Morgan Jeffery praised the soundtrack and writing as well, but also criticised the performances from the guest cast. Jeffery also noted a marked shift in Doctor Who's style, and said that fans looking for a "traditional Doctor-vs-monsters tale" may not be satisfied by the episode.

Patrick Mulkern of Radio Times called the episode an "imperfect jewel", praising the writer and soundtrack, but criticising the aliens as being superfluous. He notes for the first time in the season, the main cast was properly utilised, with Yaz being the focus for the first time. Caroline Siede of A.V. Club praised the writing, but criticised the underuse of characters. However, she stated that the episode showed the best impulses of the season as well, by mixing "big, historical ideas with small, personal stories of perseverance", showing that even in the deepest sorrows of the past, there is hope.

In April 2019, "Demons of the Punjab" was announced as a finalist (nominee) in the category of Best Dramatic Presentation, Short Form at the 2019 Hugo Awards.
