= Rosa (Doctor Who) =

279 – "Rosa"
- Doctor Who episode

Cast
- Doctor: Jodie Whittaker – Thirteenth Doctor
- Companions: Bradley Walsh – Graham O'Brien; Tosin Cole – Ryan Sinclair; Mandip Gill – Yasmin Khan
- Others: Vinette Robinson – Rosa Parks; Joshua Bowman – Krasko; Trevor White – James Blake; Richard Lothian – Mr Steele; Gareth Marks – Police officer Mason; David Rubin – Raymond Parks; Ray Sesay – Martin Luther King Jr.; Aki Omoshaybi – Fred Gray; David Dukas – Elias Griffin Jr; Morgan Deare – Arthur; Jessica Claire Preddy – Waitress

Production
- Directed by: Mark Tonderai
- Written by: Malorie Blackman and Chris Chibnall
- Produced by: Nikki Wilson
- Executive producers: Chris Chibnall; Matt Strevens; Sam Hoyle
- Music by: Segun Akinola
- Series: Series 11
- Running time: 50 minutes
- First broadcast: 21 October 2018

Chronology
← Preceded by "The Ghost Monument"	Followed by → "Arachnids in the UK"

"Rosa" is the third episode of the eleventh series of the British science fiction television programme Doctor Who. It was written by Malorie Blackman and executive producer Chris Chibnall, and directed by Mark Tonderai, and was first broadcast on BBC One on 21 October 2018.

In the episode, alien time traveller the Doctor (Jodie Whittaker) and her companions Graham O'Brien (Bradley Walsh), Ryan Sinclair (Tosin Cole), and Yasmin Khan (Mandip Gill) arrive in Alabama in 1955, and find themselves seeking to stop time-travelling criminal Krasko (Joshua Bowman) from preventing Rosa Parks (Vinette Robinson) influencing the American civil rights movement during the Montgomery bus boycott. The episode's plot concerns racial segregation in the United States at the time, including the law upheld in Alabama regarding municipal transit during this period.

The closing credits of "Rosa" were played out with the single "Rise Up" by Andra Day, making it one of few episodes in the programme's history not to end with the traditional closing theme. The episode was watched by 8.41 million viewers and received positive reviews from critics.

== Plot ==
When the Thirteenth Doctor attempts to return to present-day Sheffield, the TARDIS instead brings her and her friends to Montgomery, Alabama in 1955. Before attempting to leave, the Doctor finds that there are traces of artron energy in the area from another time travel device. Deciding to investigate, the group learn that they have arrived the day before Rosa Parks refused to give up her seat as bus driver James F. Blake demanded on 1 December, effectively influencing the civil rights movement. Tracing the energy, the group locate a suitcase of equipment from the future but are unable to learn more when they are forced to flee when its owner attempts to hit them with a time displacement device. The Doctor suspects he is trying to alter Parks' history.

Leaving her friends to research everything behind the critical moment on 1 December, the Doctor returns to examine the suitcase's contents before using it to shield herself from its owner — a rehabilitated mass murderer named Krasko. The Doctor learns that Krasko seeks to prevent the Montgomery bus boycott from occurring, but cannot simply kill Parks, since his neural implants prevent him from killing any living being. The Doctor is unable to convince him to abandon his plan, despite taking his time displacement device and destroying his vortex manipulator. When the Doctor learns that Krasko had arranged for Blake to take the day off, she and her friends focus on keeping history on track despite Krasko working to counter their efforts.

Ryan encounters Krasko blocking the bus route with a car after removing false notices at bus stops, learning that Krasko succeeded in keeping the bus from reaching its passenger quota. Ryan learns that Krasko's actions are motivated by his deeply racist views, and uses the criminal's own displacement device to send him into the past to stop him completely. Removing the blockade, he and the others rejoin the Doctor on the bus as passengers before reaching Empire Theater. As the moment arrives, the Doctor realises they have become integral to events, and is forced to keep them aboard the bus. After witnessing Parks being arrested by the police for violating segregation laws, the group return to the TARDIS where the Doctor shows them the impact Rosa has had on history, leading to an asteroid being named in her honour in the future.

=== Continuity ===
The prison of Stormcage, mentioned in "Rosa" when the Thirteenth Doctor recognises a tattoo on the arm of Krasko, was featured in episodes of the Eleventh Doctor, primarily as the place where River Song serves time for the "murder" of her husband.

== Production ==
Co-written by Blackman, she became the first writer of colour to work on the programme in its entire history (something almost accomplished by Robin Mukherjee 29 years earlier, during the run of the original series with the unmade Alixion).

=== Casting ===
After the premiere episode, "The Woman Who Fell to Earth", was broadcast, it was confirmed that Vinette Robinson and Joshua Bowman would be among a number of guest actors that would appear in the series. Vinette Robinson previously appeared on Doctor Who as Abi Lerner in Series 3 episode "42", also written by Chris Chibnall.

Actor Morgan Deare, playing Arthur in this episode, also previously appeared on Doctor Who, as Hawk in the November 1987 three-episode serial Delta and the Bannermen.

=== Music ===
The closing credits for "Rosa" were played out with the single "Rise Up" by Andra Day. It is one of few episodes in the programme's history not to end with the traditional closing theme.

=== Filming ===
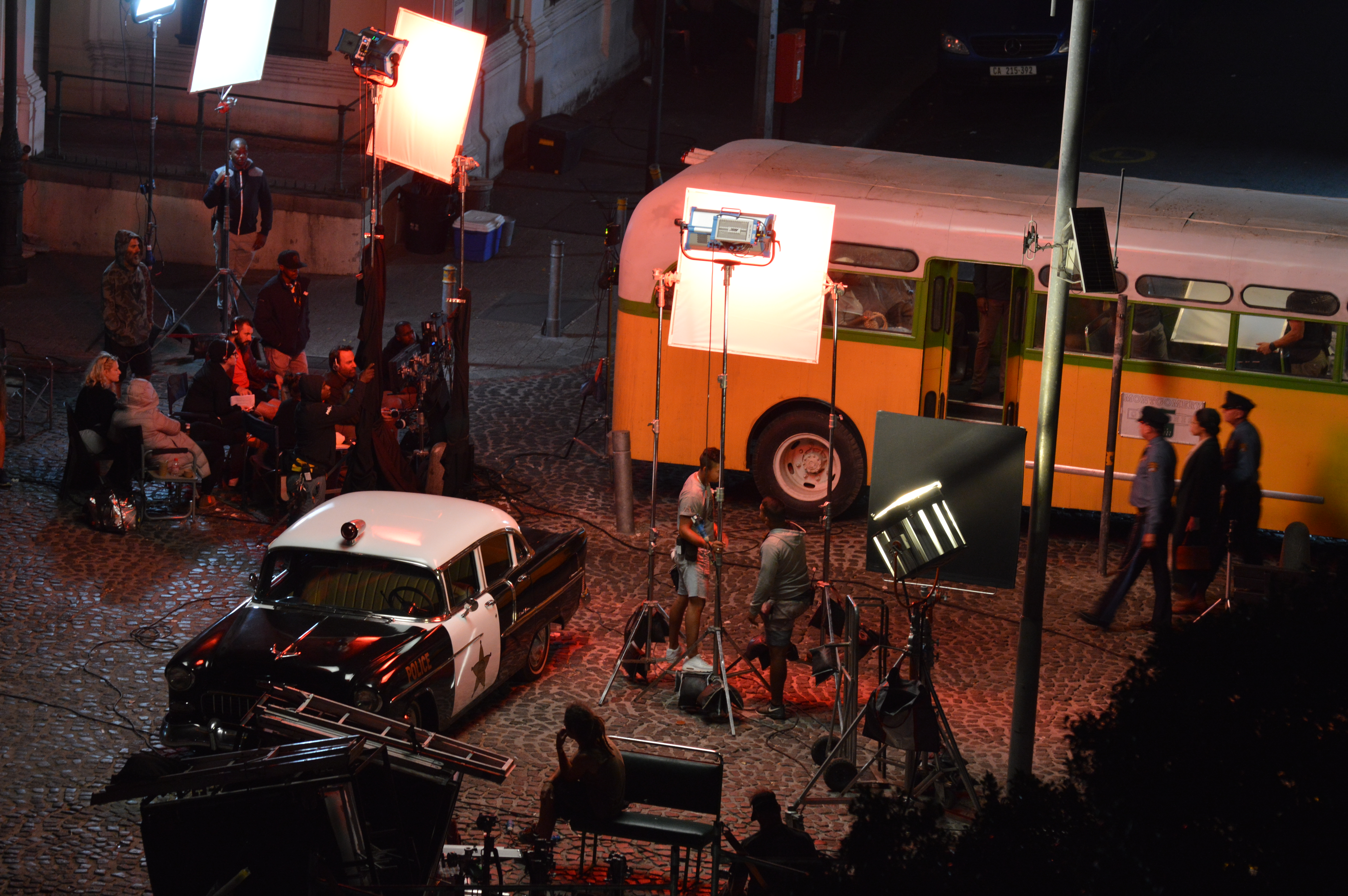
The third episode of the 11th season of Doctor Who being filmed in Cape Town at Greenmarket Square. The scene depicts Rosa Parks being escorted off a bus, initiating the Montgomery bus boycott.

The episode was filmed in Cape Town, South Africa.

== Broadcast and reception ==
Professional ratings
Aggregate scores
Source	Rating
Rotten Tomatoes (Average Score)	7.99
Rotten Tomatoes (Tomatometer)	97%
Review scores
Source	Rating
Entertainment Weekly	B
Daily Mirror	4/5 stars
New York Magazine	5/5 stars
Radio Times	3/5 stars
The A.V. Club	B+
The Telegraph	2/5 stars
The Independent	4/5 stars
TV Fanatic	4.7/5 stars

=== Ratings ===
"Rosa" was watched by 6.39 million viewers overnight, accounting for an audience share of 29.6%, making it the second-highest overnight viewership for the night, and fifth for the week on overnights across all channels. The episode had an Audience Appreciation Index score of 83. The episode received an official total of 8.41 million viewers across all UK channels, making it the 4th most watched programme of the week.

In the United States, the broadcast on BBC America had 808,000 viewers for the night.

=== Critical reception ===
"Rosa" was met with positive reviews from critics. It holds an approval rating of 97% based on 30 reviews on Rotten Tomatoes, with an average rating of 7.99/10. The critical consensus reads "First time Doctor Who writer Malorie Blackman pens an insightful installment that returns the show to its educational roots and serves as a reminder of how powerful purposeful science fiction can be."

In February 2019, the episode won the Visionary Arts Organisation Award for Television Show of the Year at the BAFTA in London. In April 2019, the episode was announced as a finalist (nominee) in the category of Best Dramatic Presentation, Short Form for the 2019 Hugo Awards.

== See also ==
- Montgomery bus boycott – Major event in the Civil Rights Movement, influenced by Rosa Parks
- Browder v. Gayle – 1956 legal case that overturned segregation on municipal bus lines
- Civil rights movement in popular culture
