= Arachnids in the UK =

280 – "Arachnids in the UK"
- Doctor Who episode

Cast
- Doctor: Jodie Whittaker – Thirteenth Doctor
- Companions: Bradley Walsh – Graham O'Brien; Tosin Cole – Ryan Sinclair; Mandip Gill – Yasmin Khan
- Others: Chris Noth – Jack Robertson; Sharon D Clarke – Grace O'Brien; Shobna Gulati – Najia Khan; Tanya Fear – Dr Jade McIntyre; Ravin J Ganatra – Hakim Khan; Bhavnisha Parmar – Sonya Khan; Jaleh Alp – Frankie Ellish; William Meredith – Kevin

Production
- Directed by: Sallie Aprahamian
- Written by: Chris Chibnall
- Produced by: Alex Mercer
- Executive producers: Chris Chibnall; Matt Strevens; Sam Hoyle
- Music by: Segun Akinola
- Series: Series 11
- Running time: 49 minutes
- First broadcast: 28 October 2018

Chronology
← Preceded by "Rosa"	Followed by → "The Tsuranga Conundrum"

"Arachnids in the UK" is the fourth episode of the eleventh series of the British science fiction television programme Doctor Who. It was written by showrunner and executive producer Chris Chibnall, directed by Sallie Aprahamian, and first broadcast on BBC One on 28 October 2018.

In the episode, alien time traveller the Doctor (Jodie Whittaker) brings her human friends – Graham O'Brien (Bradley Walsh), Ryan Sinclair (Tosin Cole), and Yasmin Khan (Mandip Gill) – back to Sheffield, where they discover a serious problem is roaming around the city in the form of giant spiders. Sharon D. Clarke reprised her role as Grace O'Brien in vision form. This episode also featured the first appearance of Chris Noth as Jack Robertson, who would return in "Revolution of the Daleks". It was watched by 8.22 million viewers and received generally positive reviews from critics.

== Plot ==
Having returned to Sheffield, the Thirteenth Doctor goes to meet with Yasmin's family alongside Ryan, whilst Graham heads home to grieve over Grace's death. After Yasmin leaves to pick up her mother, Najia Khan, the Doctor and Ryan encounter arachnologist Dr. Jade McIntyre while trying to meet the family's next door neighbour. Gaining entry, the group discover its owner, McIntyre's colleague, has been killed by a large spider. After Graham rejoins them upon having found something similar at his house, the group learn that McIntyre has been investigating bizarre behaviour patterns in spider ecosystems, after suspending experiments with spiders at her laboratory. The Doctor deduces that the giant spiders and behaviour patterns are linked to a recently built luxury hotel complex, which Najia worked at until being fired earlier that day by the hotel's wealthy American owner and prospective presidential candidate, Jack Robertson.

Arriving at the hotel and joined by Robertson, Yasmin and Najia, the group learn the spiders have infested the complex and that they are now sealed in by them. While Ryan and Graham capture a spider for examination, the rest of the group discover the spiders came from abandoned mine tunnels beneath the complex, discovering the bodies of Robertson's bodyguard and personal assistant. Further investigation soon reveals the tunnels were used as a dumping ground for industrial waste by one of Robertson's companies. McIntyre, who revealed to the Doctor her experiments involved genetically modified spiders, realises the giant spiders are the offspring of a specimen that had been dumped by the same company, on the belief it was dead. The Doctor theorises the toxicity of the dumping ground mutated them further.

To kill them humanely, the group lure the offspring into a panic room Robertson built into the hotel, before encountering the specimen itself in the ballroom. Upon finding it, the Doctor and McIntyre realise the spider is dying from breathing difficulties due to its massive size. Before the Doctor can ensure it dies humanely, Robertson kills it with his bodyguard's gun, much to her disgust. With the situation resolved, Ryan, Yasmin and Graham contemplate returning to their normal lives but decide to see more of the universe with the Doctor, much to her delight.

== Casting ==
The episode stars Jodie Whittaker as The Doctor. Bradley Walsh, Tosin Cole, and Mandip Gill appear as The Doctor's companions Graham O'Brien, Ryan Sinclair, and Yasmin Khan respectively.

After the premiere episode, "The Woman Who Fell to Earth", was broadcast, it was confirmed that Chris Noth and Shobna Gulati would be among a number of guest actors that would appear in the series.' Noth portrayed Jack Robertson.

== Broadcast and reception ==
Professional ratings
Aggregate scores
Source	Rating
Rotten Tomatoes (Average Score)	7.22
Rotten Tomatoes (Tomatometer)	87%
Review scores
Source	Rating
Entertainment Weekly	B−
Daily Mirror	5/5 stars
Radio Times	5/5 stars
Starburst	7/10
The Independent	3/5 stars
The Times	4/5 stars
TV Fanatic	4/5 stars

=== Ratings ===
"Arachnids in the UK" was watched by 6.43 million viewers overnight, a share of 29.3% of the total TV audience, making it the second-highest overnight viewership for the night, and third for the week on overnights across all channels. The episode had an Audience Appreciation Index score of 83. It received an official total of 8.22 million viewers across all UK channels, making it the 4th most watched programme of the week.

In the United States, the broadcast on BBC America had 900,000 viewers for the night.

=== Critical reception ===
The episode was met with generally positive reviews. It holds an approval rating of 87% based on 30 reviews on Rotten Tomatoes, with an average rating of 7.22/10. The critical consensus reads "Creepy, crawly, and chock-full of first-class guest stars, 'Arachnids in the U.K.' feels like a big budget B-movie, providing another delightful romp for Team T.A.R.D.I.S.."
