= Revolution of the Daleks =

296 – "Revolution of the Daleks"
- Doctor Who episode
- Promotional poster

Cast
- Doctor: Jodie Whittaker – Thirteenth Doctor
- Companions: Bradley Walsh – Graham O'Brien; Tosin Cole – Ryan Sinclair; Mandip Gill – Yasmin Khan; John Barrowman – Jack Harkness
- Others: Chris Noth – Robertson; Harriet Walter – Jo Patterson; Nathan Stewart-Jarrett – Leo Rugazzi; Nathan Armarkwei-Laryea – Armen; Helen Anderson – Rachel; Nicholas Briggs – Voice of the Daleks; Barnaby Edwards, Nicholas Pegg – Dalek Operators; Sharon D Clarke – Grace

Production
- Directed by: Lee Haven Jones
- Written by: Chris Chibnall
- Produced by: Alex Mercer
- Executive producers: Chris Chibnall; Matt Strevens
- Music by: Segun Akinola
- Running time: 71 minutes
- First broadcast: 1 January 2021

Chronology
← Preceded by "The Timeless Children"	Followed by → "The Halloween Apocalypse"

"Revolution of the Daleks" is a special episode of the British science fiction television programme Doctor Who, first broadcast on BBC One on 1 January 2021. It was written by Chris Chibnall, and directed by Lee Haven Jones. The episode follows the twelfth series as a New Year’s Day special, continuing on from "The Timeless Children" (2020).

The episode stars Jodie Whittaker as the Thirteenth Doctor, with Bradley Walsh, Tosin Cole and Mandip Gill as companions Graham O'Brien, Ryan Sinclair and Yasmin Khan respectively. Walsh and Cole depart the series in this episode. It also stars John Barrowman as Jack Harkness, following his return to the series in "Fugitive of the Judoon" (2020).

The episode was watched by 6.35 million viewers overall.

== Plot ==
It is revealed that in 2019, shortly after the destruction of the Reconnaissance Scout Dalek, (Note: As depicted in "Resolution" (2019).) the damaged casing from it was transported to a government facility but intercepted en route. Using the Dalek parts, businessman Jack Robertson funded a defence drone resembling a Dalek to suppress public riots and gave some to politician Jo Patterson to use in her constituency.

In the present day, 10 months have passed since Graham, Ryan and Yaz returned to Earth. (Note: As depicted in "The Timeless Children" (2020).) Graham and Ryan meet Yaz at the TARDIS they returned in, which is disguised as a house in a neighbourhood, where she is investigating the whereabouts of the Doctor. Graham shows her a leaked video of the defence drone demonstration and they unsuccessfully confront Robertson about the drones.

Patterson, projected to be elected the Prime Minister, requests that Robertson increase the drone production so they can be implemented nationally. Scientist Leo Rugazzi discovers organic cells in the Dalek remnants and clones the cells into a living creature. Leo shows the new creature to Robertson, with the latter immediately ordering its destruction. Before he can incinerate the creature, it escapes and takes control of Leo's mind and body. Dalek-controlled Leo travels to Osaka, Japan, where Dalek clones are already being grown in a facility.

The Doctor has been imprisoned in a distant asteroid for a number of decades. (Note: Shown imprisoned with the Doctor are a Weeping Angel, an Ood, a Sycorax, a Pting and a Silent.) She eventually encounters Jack Harkness, who learned of her arrest and committed a series of crimes in order to rescue her. He uses a temporal freezing gateway disinhibitor bubble to take them both to his vortex manipulator which he had previously hid in another cell, which transports them back to the Doctor's TARDIS. The Doctor rejoins her companions and learns about the new Dalek threat. Jack and Yaz investigate the facility in Japan while the Doctor, Graham, and Ryan confront Robertson. They all meet back up in Japan where the Dalek reveals its plan to take over Earth. Using ultraviolet light, the Dalek clones transport themselves into the defence drones which begin exterminating humans, as well as assassinating Patterson.

The Doctor sends out a Dalek reconnaissance signal, which reaches a death squad of Daleks. The death squad Daleks eliminate the reconnaissance Daleks because they do not consider them pure Dalek due to them having traces of human DNA. Impressed by their intelligence, Robertson decides to make an alliance with the Daleks and reveals that the Doctor actually summoned them. Jack, Graham, and Ryan infiltrate the Dalek ship to rig it with explosives. The Doctor tricks the Daleks into the other TARDIS where it is set to collapse on itself and be transported to the Void to be destroyed. Robertson weakly claims he was acting as a "decoy" by betraying the Doctor, before using his encounter with the Daleks to restore his public reputation.

After Jack leaves to catch up with Gwen Cooper, the Doctor prepares to resume travelling with her companions. However, Ryan announces his decision to stay on Earth and Graham elects to remain with his grandson. They sadly part ways with the Doctor, who gifts them with psychic paper. The Doctor and Yaz continue their adventures together, while Ryan and Graham decide to use their new psychic paper to investigate strange phenomena on Earth. Ryan and Graham first attempt to help Ryan ride a bicycle as they did before meeting the Doctor and see a vision of Grace O'Brien watching over them.

=== Outside references ===
The Doctor refers to the imprisoned Ood and Sycorax as Bonnie and Clyde.

During her captivity, the Doctor quotes the first sentence of Harry Potter and the Philosopher's Stone to herself as a bedtime story.

Robertson appears on Newsnight to explain his encounter with the Daleks at the end of the episode, with its host Emily Maitlis making an uncredited cameo as herself.

== Production ==
=== Development ===
"Revolution of the Daleks" was written by showrunner Chris Chibnall. The title of the special episode was revealed after the credits of the twelfth series finale, "The Timeless Children". The episode features the Daleks, last seen in "Resolution" (2019). In April 2020, Chibnall confirmed that post-production was continuing on "Revolution of the Daleks" remotely throughout the COVID-19 pandemic. Promotional stills from filming were released at a virtual Comic Con on 9 October 2020.

=== Casting ===
Bradley Walsh, Tosin Cole and Mandip Gill reprise their roles as Graham O'Brien, Ryan Sinclair and Yasmin Khan, respectively. On 23 November 2020, John Barrowman confirmed that he would return for the special as Captain Jack Harkness, after last reprising the role in "Fugitive of the Judoon". In November 2020, SFX #355 reported that Chris Noth would return as Jack Robertson, Harriet Walter had been cast, and Walsh and Cole would depart the series in this episode.

=== Filming ===
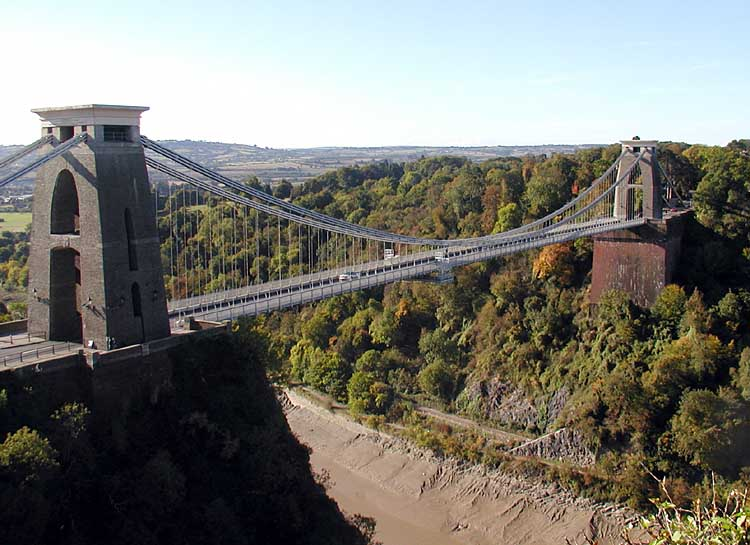
Filming for the episode took place on the Clifton Suspension Bridge in 2019.

The episode was directed by Lee Haven Jones, who also directed "Spyfall, Part 2" and "Orphan 55" of the twelfth series. The Clifton Suspension Bridge in Bristol was used as the setting for a scene, which was filmed in October 2019 while the bridge was closed, supposedly for repair. Images and video recordings showing Dalek props on the bridge were leaked by passers-by during a break in filming.

== Broadcast and reception ==
Professional ratings
Aggregate scores
Source	Rating
Rotten Tomatoes (Average Score)	7/10
Rotten Tomatoes (Tomatometer)	69%
Review scores
Source	Rating
The A.V. Club	B−
SFX	3/5 stars
IGN	6/10
Radio Times	4/5 stars
The Independent	5/5 stars

=== Television ===
"Revolution of the Daleks" aired on BBC One in the United Kingdom on 1 January 2021, after being announced for the "festive season" of 2020/2021. The episode aired in the United States on BBC America on the same day, and aired in Australia on ABC TV and ABC iview on 2 January 2021.

=== Ratings ===
"Revolution of the Daleks" was watched by 4.69 million viewers overnight, making it the third most watched programme for the day in the United Kingdom, and the most watched on BBC One. The episode received an official total of 6.25 million viewers across all UK channels. BARB viewing data shows that 6.35 million watched the episode when all platforms are considered. The show was 2nd for the day and 10th for the week. While this was the show’s best performance in a year, it was the lowest-rated special to date. It also received an Audience Appreciation Index score of 79.

The live broadcast on BBC America had 652,000 viewers.

=== Critical reception ===
On review aggregator Rotten Tomatoes, 69% of 13 critics gave the special a positive review, and an average rating of 7/10. The website's critical consensus reads, "Despite fun moments and some welcome reunions, 'Revolution of the Daleks' doesn't have the emotional weight to pull off its social commentary and two goodbyes."

== Home media ==
"Revolution of the Daleks" received a standalone DVD and Blu-ray release in Region 2/B on 25 January 2021, and in Region 1/A on 2 March 2021, and in Region 4/B on 21 March 2021.

== Soundtrack ==
Twelve selected pieces of score from this special as composed by Segun Akinola were released on digital music platforms on 2 January 2021 by Silva Screen Records. It was released on 11 November 2022 as a bonus disc to the Series 13 – Flux soundtrack release.

Doctor Who: Series 12 – Revolution of the Daleks

Soundtrack album by Segun Akinola
- Released: 2 January 2021
- Recorded: 2020
- Genre: Soundtrack
- Length: 67:10
- Label: Silva Screen
- Producer: Segun Akinola

Doctor Who soundtrack chronology
Doctor Who: The Visitation (2020)	''Doctor Who: Series 12 – Revolution of the Daleks'' (2021)	Doctor Who: Series 13 – Flux (2022)

No.	Title	Length
1.	"367 Minutes"	1:58
2.	"A Cuppa"	1:15
3.	"Something Revolutionary"	6:48
4.	"Breakout Ball"	6:54
5.	"The Clone"	6:28
6.	"The Production Line"	8:48
7.	"Stability and Security"	3:48
8.	"Thank You for Being My Friend"	3:52
9.	"Activate"	5:51
10.	"The Death Squad"	5:59
11.	"Bad Boys"	8:10
12.	"Bye Fam"	7:19
Total length:		67:10
