= The Battle of Ranskoor Av Kolos =

2018 British Doctor Who episode

286 – "The Battle of Ranskoor Av Kolos"
- Doctor Who episode

Cast
- Doctor: Jodie Whittaker – Thirteenth Doctor
- Companions: Bradley Walsh – Graham O'Brien; Tosin Cole – Ryan Sinclair; Mandip Gill – Yasmin Khan
- Others: Phyllis Logan – Andinio; Mark Addy – Paltraki; Percelle Ascott – Delph; Samuel Oatley – Tzim-Sha; Jan Le – Umsang

Production
- Directed by: Jamie Childs
- Written by: Chris Chibnall
- Produced by: Alex Mercer
- Executive producers: Chris Chibnall; Matt Strevens; Sam Hoyle
- Music by: Segun Akinola
- Series: Series 11
- Running time: 50 minutes
- First broadcast: 9 December 2018

Chronology
| ← Preceded by "It Takes You Away" | Followed by → "Resolution" |

"The Battle of Ranskoor Av Kolos" is the tenth and final episode of the eleventh series of the British science fiction television programme Doctor Who. It was written by Chris Chibnall and directed by Jamie Childs, and was first broadcast on BBC One on 9 December 2018.

Set on the planet Ranskoor Av Kolos, the episode involves the alien time traveller the Thirteenth Doctor (Jodie Whittaker) and her companions Graham O'Brien (Bradley Walsh), Ryan Sinclair (Tosin Cole), and Yasmin Khan (Mandip Gill) working to stop the alien Stenza Tzim-Sha (Samuel Oatley) from using the powers of the psychic race the Ux to shrink the Earth in revenge for his previous defeat and exile thousands of years earlier.

The episode was watched by 6.65 million viewers, and received mixed reviews from critics.

== Plot ==
The Thirteenth Doctor directs the TARDIS to a planet called Ranskoor Av Kolos, where a large number of distress signals are originating. The Doctor and her companions find a large number of wrecked spaceships scattered on the planet's surface, as well as a psychic field that alters one's perception of reality. They come across an amnesiac pilot named Paltraki and help him regain his memories before he receives a video signal from Tzim-Sha. Tzim-Sha demands Paltraki return an item – seemingly a rock floating in a protective shell – to him in exchange for Paltraki's kidnapped crew. Graham later confesses to the Doctor his intent to kill Tzim-Sha to avenge his murdered wife Grace, accepting that he could never travel with the Doctor again should he survive.

Once the group enters Tzim-Sha's ship, Graham and Ryan search for the kidnapped crew whilst Yasmin helps Paltraki remember his mission. The Doctor encounters Tzim-Sha, learning that he ended up on Ranskoor Av Kolos after their previous encounter on Earth, having won the loyalty of the religious-minded Ux, a race of two that can psychically manipulate reality. Tzim-Sha spent the next three millennia combining the Uxs' powers with Stenza technology to create a life support system and a weapon that shrinks planets like the one from Paltraki's ship. Yasmin and Paltraki discover four similar planets, the latter remembering his mission to save the planets Tzim-Sha took alongside a fleet that the Stenza devastated. Tzim-Sha then sets his sights to do the same to Earth out of revenge, ignoring the Doctor's warning that his actions threaten the fabric of reality.

The Doctor reaches Yasmin and safely stops the Ux from shrinking Earth, convincing them that Tzim-Sha exploited them while asking their help. The Doctor works with the Ux to use the TARDIS and Tzim-Sha's ship to restore the planets to their original positions in space. Meanwhile, Graham and Ryan free Paltraki's crew along with the other ships' crews. This alerts Tzim-Sha as he enters his trophy room, finding Graham waiting to shoot him. But Graham manages to hold back, before Ryan's arrival provokes him to shoot Tzim-Sha in the foot to save his grandson. They trap Tzim-Sha in a stasis chamber, telling him to reflect on his actions, including Grace's death. With Tzim-Sha's ship sealed, the Ux leave with Paltraki to help return the surviving crew members to their proper worlds.

=== Continuity ===
The Doctor mentions using the TARDIS to drag a planet across the universe, a reference to the Tenth Doctor returning the Earth to its proper place in "Journey's End", and to rebirth a Slitheen as an egg, which the Ninth Doctor did in "Boom Town".

== Production ==
=== Development ===
In a 2022 interview with Doctor Who Magazine Chibnall revealed that the episode was his least favourite script of the series, stating:

Particularly in that first series, I spent a lot of time helping other writers. We had some problems towards the end and I had to go back and do some big rewrites, which meant that the version of episode 10 [The Battle of Ranskoor Av Kolos] that we filmed was a first draft. But I just didn’t have time to do a second draft. It didn’t feel enough like a season finale, and that was entirely down to time.

— Chris Chibnall

== Broadcast and reception ==
Professional ratings
Aggregate scores
| Source | Rating |
|---|---|
| Rotten Tomatoes (Average Score) | 6.3 |
| Rotten Tomatoes (Tomatometer) | 73% |
Review scores
| Source | Rating |
| Entertainment Weekly | B− |
| Daily Mirror | 3/5 stars |
| New York Magazine | 2/5 stars |
| Radio Times | 3/5 stars |
| The A.V. Club | B− |
| The Telegraph | 2/5 stars |
| TV Fanatic | 4.5/5 stars |

=== Ratings ===
"The Battle of Ranskoor Av Kolos" was watched by 5.32 million viewers overnight, a share of 26.4% of the total United Kingdom TV audience, making it the fourth-highest overnight viewership for the night and the 21st-highest overnight viewership for the week on overnights across all UK channels. The episode received an official total of 6.65 million viewers across all UK channels, making it the 18th most watched programme of the week, and it had an Audience Appreciation Index score of 79.

=== Critical response ===
The episode earned mixed reviews. It holds an approval rating of 73%, based on 22 reviews, and an average score of 6.3/10 on Rotten Tomatoes. The website's critical consensus reads, "After a season of swashbuckling adventures, 'The Battle of Ranskoor Av Kolos' feels too familiar to truly satisfy as a Doctor Who finale — but it does well enough to inspire hope that future seasons of Jodie Whittaker's tenure may pack more of a punch." A critical study of the episode has been made for the Black Archive book series.
