= The Tsuranga Conundrum =

281 – "The Tsuranga Conundrum"
- Doctor Who episode

Cast
- Doctor: Jodie Whittaker – Thirteenth Doctor
- Companions: Bradley Walsh – Graham O'Brien; Tosin Cole – Ryan Sinclair; Mandip Gill – Yasmin Khan
- Others: Brett Goldstein – Astos; Lois Chimimba – Mabli; Suzanne Packer – Eve Cicero; Ben Bailey-Smith – Durkas Cicero; David Shields – Ronan; Jack Shalloo – Yoss

Production
- Directed by: Jennifer Perrott
- Written by: Chris Chibnall
- Produced by: Nikki Wilson
- Executive producers: Chris Chibnall; Matt Strevens; Sam Hoyle
- Music by: Segun Akinola
- Series: Series 11
- Running time: 51 minutes
- First broadcast: 4 November 2018

Chronology
← Preceded by "Arachnids in the UK"	Followed by → "Demons of the Punjab"

"The Tsuranga Conundrum" is the fifth episode of the eleventh series of the British science fiction television programme Doctor Who. It was written by showrunner and executive producer Chris Chibnall, directed by Jennifer Perrott, and first broadcast on BBC One on 4 November 2018.

In the episode, alien time traveller the Doctor (Jodie Whittaker) and her companions – Graham O'Brien (Bradley Walsh), Ryan Sinclair (Tosin Cole), and Yasmin Khan (Mandip Gill) – are brought aboard a medical ship to recover from injuries they recently endured, only to find themselves dealing with a dangerous alien creature that threatens the ship and those being transported by it. The episode guest stars Brett Goldstein, Lois Chimimba, Suzanne Packer, Ben Bailey-Smith, David Shields, and Jack Shalloo. The episode was watched by 7.76 million viewers, and was met with mixed reviews from critics.

== Plot ==
While scavenging on an alien junkyard planet, the Thirteenth Doctor, and her companions, Graham, Yasmin, and Ryan are caught in a sonic mine's detonation. They wake aboard the Tsuranga, an automated ship travelling to a medical space station. Exploring the ship, the Doctor meets some of the patients being transported – Eve Cicero, a renowned general; her brother Durkas; Eve's synth robot partner Ronan; and Yoss, a pregnant man. After gaining access to the ship's systems, the Doctor, alongside head nurse Astos, notice something heading for the ship. They realise it is an alien entity, which gains access to the ship and starts damaging its escape pods. Astos becomes trapped in one that he is inspecting, and dies when the pod is jettisoned into space and explodes.

Helped by Mabli, Astos' colleague, the Doctor learns that the entity is a Pting, a creature that eats non-organic material and is classified as highly dangerous. Learning that the ship will be remotely detonated if the space station detects the creature aboard, the Doctor works to prevent this happening. While Yasmin and Ronan defend the ship's power source from the Pting, Ryan and Graham offer to help Mabli with Yoss as he enters labour. Meanwhile, the Doctor, Eve, and Durkas focus on gaining manual control of the ship. During this time, the Doctor learns that Eve has a critical heart condition that could kill her if she interfaces with the ship. Despite this, Eve sacrifices herself to protect everyone aboard the ship by navigating it through an asteroid field, before Durkas assumes control in her place.

The Doctor suddenly deduces that the Pting was attracted to the ship looking for energy sources, its true food source. With this knowledge, she returns to the ship's power source, realizing it has a built-in failsafe bomb. Removing it, she primes the device and feeds it to the Pting, giving it ample energy before she jettisons it into space. Durkas safely brings the Tsuranga to the space station, while Ryan and Graham help Yoss give birth successfully. Before leaving to recover her TARDIS with the others, the Doctor joins Mabli and the patients in honouring Eve for her courage.

== Production ==
=== Development ===
The Pting creature was created and named by writer Tim Price, who worked in the story room early in the series' development. Chibnall told Marcus Hearn of Doctor Who Magazine that the team loved the "brilliant and unusual name for the alien."

A sequel to this story, dubbed "Ptings", which would have been written by Chris Chibnall, was planned for later production, though this was scrapped.

=== Casting ===
After the premiere episode, "The Woman Who Fell to Earth", was broadcast, it was announced that Brett Goldstein, Lois Chimimba, and Ben Bailey-Smith would be among a number of guest actors that would appear in the series. They play Astos, Mabli and Durkas Cicero respectively. "The Tsuranga Conundrum" also guest stars Suzanne Packer as Eve Cicero, David Shields as Ronan, and Jack Shalloo as Yoss Inkl.

=== Filming ===
To help with filming the episode, production staff invited Australian director Jennifer Perrott to come over and oversee the directing of scenes for "The Tsuranga Conundrum".

== Broadcast and reception ==
Professional ratings
Aggregate scores
Source	Rating
Rotten Tomatoes (Average Score)	6.1
Rotten Tomatoes (Tomatometer)	79%
Review scores
Source	Rating
Entertainment Weekly	B−
Daily Mirror	3/5 stars
Radio Times	1/5 stars
The A.V. Club	B
The Independent	3/5 stars
TV Fanatic	3.5/5 stars

=== Ratings ===
"The Tsuranga Conundrum" was watched by 6.12 million viewers overnight, a share of 29.5% of the total TV audience, making it the second-highest overnight viewership for the night and the sixth-highest overnight viewership for the week on overnights across all channels. The episode had an Audience Appreciation Index score of 79. It received an official total of 7.76 million viewers across all UK channels, making it the sixth most watched programme of the week.

=== Critical reception ===
The episode was met with mixed reviews. Rotten Tomatoes gave the episode an approval rating of 79%, based on 24 critics, and an average score of 6.1/10, the critical consensus stating: "True colors rise to the surface in 'The Tsuranga Conundrum' as the team tackles difficult emotions, new found confidence, and impending mayhem."
