= Resolution (Doctor Who) =

2019 British Doctor Who episode

287 – "Resolution"
- Doctor Who episode
- Promotional image

Cast
- Doctor: Jodie Whittaker – Thirteenth Doctor
- Companions: Bradley Walsh – Graham O'Brien; Tosin Cole – Ryan Sinclair; Mandip Gill – Yasmin Khan
- Others: Charlotte Ritchie – Lin; Nikesh Patel – Mitch; Daniel Adegboyega – Aaron Sinclair; Darryl Clark – Police Officer Will; Connor Calland – Security Guard Richard; James Lewis – Farmer Dinkle; Sophie Duval – Mum; Callum McDonald – Teen 1; Harry Vallance – Teen 2; Laura Evelyn – Call Centre Polly; Michael Ballard – Sergeant; Nicholas Briggs – Voice of the Dalek

Production
- Directed by: Wayne Yip
- Written by: Chris Chibnall
- Produced by: Nikki Wilson
- Executive producers: Chris Chibnall; Matt Strevens; Sam Hoyle
- Music by: Segun Akinola
- Running time: 60 minutes
- First broadcast: 1 January 2019

Chronology
| ← Preceded by "The Battle of Ranskoor Av Kolos" | Followed by → "Spyfall" |

"Resolution" is an episode of the British science fiction television programme Doctor Who. It was written by showrunner, head writer and executive producer Chris Chibnall, directed by Wayne Yip, and was first broadcast on BBC One on 1 January 2019. The special follows the eleventh series as a New Year's Day special episode, instead of the traditional annual Christmas special. "Resolution" was the only episode of Doctor Who to air in 2019, preceding the twelfth series in 2020.

The episode stars Jodie Whittaker as the Thirteenth Doctor, alongside Bradley Walsh, Tosin Cole, and Mandip Gill as her companions, Graham O'Brien, Ryan Sinclair and Yasmin Khan, respectively. The episode also sees the return of the Daleks. The episode was watched by 7.13 million viewers.

== Plot ==
In the 9th century, three opposing factions narrowly succeeded in defeating a seemingly unbeatable enemy and hacked its body into three pieces to be hidden away in the farthest corners of the Earth: Anuta Island, Siberia, and Yorkshire. The holder of the last piece in Yorkshire is killed before he can bury it, leaving it unguarded. Lin and Mitch, two archaeologists, discover it in Sheffield on New Year's Day 2019, and unintentionally revive it as it remotely summons the other two fragments to become whole.

Whilst watching New Year's Day fireworks from different time periods, the Thirteenth Doctor and her companions are alerted to this alien presence, arriving in the present day and meeting the two archaeologists. Lin reveals that she saw a large squid-like creature on a wall; the Doctor finds only a large blob of slime. Unbeknownst to the others, the creature has attached itself to Lin's back and has taken control of her mind and body.

Returning to Graham and Ryan's home, the crew discover that Ryan's hitherto absent father, Aaron, has returned, and wishes to make amends with his son for not being there, especially since the death of Ryan's grandmother (and Graham's wife) Grace. Graham is skeptical, but supports Ryan when he decides to go with Aaron to a local cafe so the two can talk. Meanwhile, the Doctor and Yasmin try to follow the creature, which has made Lin steal a police car and uniform. After examining the slime, the Doctor discovers that she is following a scout Dalek.

The Dalek, still controlling Lin, arrives at an archive base, killing its guard and using his fingerprints to access the archives. Recovering a Dalek ray gun from the archive, she then travels to a rural warehouse, killing the owner and constructing a makeshift Dalek casing out of scrap metal. Eventually, the Doctor and company find Lin freed from the now-rebuilt Dalek's control. After killing a military patrol, the Dalek flies to Government Communications Headquarters, massacring the staff, and attempts to summon a Dalek fleet in order to conquer the Earth.

The Doctor, her TARDIS crew, Aaron and the two archaeologists immediately go to GCHQ and scupper the fleet-summoning signal, destroying the Dalek's casing in the process. However, the mutant survives and possesses Aaron, threatening to kill him unless the Doctor takes it to Skaro to rally the fleet. The Doctor agrees, but instead takes the Dalek mutant to a supernova. Ryan saves Aaron at the last moment as the Dalek mutant is cast into the supernova.

Back in Sheffield, the Doctor offers Aaron the chance to travel in the TARDIS, but Aaron declines. The TARDIS crew bid farewell to Aaron and the archaeologists and depart.

== Production ==
=== Development ===
Along with the regular series, special Christmas episodes were also broadcast every year between 2005, the year of the programme's revival, and 2017. "Twice Upon a Time" (2017) marked the last special episode created for Christmas, after the traditional special episode was moved to New Year's Day in 2019. The episode title was announced on 8 December 2018 as "Resolution".

Chibnall stated during filming for the eleventh series, which included "Resolution", that the Daleks would not be featured; however, on 25 December 2018, the BBC announced that the New Year's Day special would feature the return of the Daleks.

=== Filming ===
"Resolution" was filmed alongside the ten episodes of the eleventh series.

=== Casting ===
On 6 December 2018, the BBC announced the guest stars for the episode, including Charlotte Ritchie, Nikesh Patel and Daniel Adegboyega, as the characters Lin, Mitch and Aaron respectively.

=== Promotion ===
The first trailer for the episode was released after the broadcast of the eleventh series' finale, "The Battle of Ranskoor Av Kolos".

== Broadcast and reception ==
Professional ratings
Aggregate scores
| Source | Rating |
|---|---|
| Rotten Tomatoes (Average Score) | 8.03 |
| Rotten Tomatoes (Tomatometer) | 95% |
Review scores
| Source | Rating |
| Entertainment Weekly | A− |
| New York Magazine | 5/5 stars |
| Radio Times | 4/5 stars |
| The A.V. Club | A− |
| The Telegraph | 4/5 stars |
| The Guardian | 4/5 stars |
| The Independent | 4/5 stars |
| The Times | 3/5 stars |
| TV Fanatic | 3.5/5 stars |

=== Broadcast ===
"Resolution" was the only episode of Doctor Who to air in 2019, as the twelfth series premiered in 2020. Similar to "Sleep No More" and "The Woman Who Fell to Earth" before it, "Resolution" featured no opening titles.

=== Ratings ===
"Resolution" was watched by 5.15 million viewers overnight, a share of 22.4% of the total United Kingdom TV audience, making it the fourth-highest overnight viewership for the night, but also the lowest overnight viewership for a Doctor Who annual event. The episode received an official total of 7.13 million viewers across all UK channels, making it the 14th most watched programme of the week, and it had an Audience Appreciation Index score of 79.

In Australia, the episode received 424,000 viewers including time shifting views.

=== Critical reception ===
The special holds an approval rating of 95% on Rotten Tomatoes, and an average of 8.03/10 based on 20 reviews. The website's critical consensus reads, "With a fresh take on familiar villains and a renewed sense of stakes, Resolution is a strong series special that surprises in both story and spectacle."

== Home media ==
"Resolution" received a standalone DVD and Blu-ray release on 18 February 2019 in Region 2/B and 19 February in Region 1/A, and was released on 6 March in Region 4/B. The episode is included in the twelfth series boxset released on 4 May 2020 in Region 2 or Region B. It is not included on the Region 1 or Region A release of the boxset.

== Soundtrack ==
Two tracks from the special, as composed by Segun Akinola, were included in the eleventh series' soundtrack, a 2-CD set that was released on 11 January 2019 by Silva Screen Records.
