= Vinay Patel =

British-Indian screenwriter and playwright

Vinay Sunilkumar Patel FRSL (born 1986) is a British-Indian screenwriter and playwright. He is best known for writing the BBC drama Murdered by My Father.

== Early life ==
Patel was born in Sidcup, South East London. He graduated with a Bachelor of Arts (BA) in English from the University of Exeter.

Before writing, Patel worked as a corporate filmmaker and then a technician at the London-based Met Film School.

In 2011, Patel graduated from the Central School of Speech and Drama with an MA in writing.

== Career ==
In 2014, he wrote True Brits, a play juxtaposing the news of the London 2012 Olympics, with the 7 July 2005 London bombings. This led to his selection for the Bush/Kudos TV writing scheme and an original short commission for BBC iPlayer. In 2018, he wrote An Adventure, inspired by his grandparents, for the Bush Theatre. Patel contributed Death is a Many Headed Monster to the BAME essay anthology The Good Immigrant.

In June 2018, Patel was elected a Fellow of the Royal Society of Literature in its "40 Under 40" initiative. In 2022, it was announced the Yard Theatre would produce Patel's sci-fi re-imagining of The Cherry Orchard, directed by James Macdonald.

=== Television ===
In 2016, he wrote BBC One's honour killing drama Murdered By My Father. It tells of an honour killing of a British Asian Muslim teenage girl, Salma (played by Kiran Sonia Sawar), by her father Shahzad (Adeel Akhtar). It was nominated for a BAFTA TV Award for best single drama, and won the RTS Award for Best Single Drama. He has also written for the first series of The Good Karma Hospital and, in 2018, contributed the sixth episode of the eleventh series of Doctor Who, "Demons of the Punjab", set during the Partition of India.

The episode received high praise from fans and critics alike, and was announced as a finalist (nominee) in the category of Best Dramatic Presentation, Short Form for the 2019 Hugo Awards. At the Eastern Eye Arts, Theater, and Culture Awards, Patel won "Best Scriptwriter" for Demons of the Punjab.

Patel returned to Doctor Who, co-writing the fifth episode, "Fugitive of the Judoon" with Chris Chibnall, for the twelfth series. Jo Martin appears as a character named Ruth Clayton, later revealed to be a previously unknown incarnation of the Doctor. Martin is credited as Ruth and with an "introducing" credit as the Doctor, as previous new incarnations of the character have been since 2005. The episode featured the return of Jack Harkness played by John Barrowman, after a ten-year absence from the series. Barrowman's appearance was not publicised prior to broadcast.

In November 2021, it was announced Patel would write an episode of Netflix's television adaptation of One Day. The series premiered on 8 February 2024 on Netflix.
