= Nikki Wilson =

British television producer

- Born: Nikki Smith
- Occupation: Television producer
- Years active: 2001–present

Nikki Wilson (née Smith) is a British television producer whose credits include Doctor Who and its spin-off The Sarah Jane Adventures. Her career had predominantly been as a script editor, in which capacity she worked on Trial & Retribution and Doctor Who.

== Career ==
In 2008, she became a producer on the Doctor Who spinoff The Sarah Jane Adventures starting with "The Last Sontaran", and in 2010 following the departure of Julie Gardner, she was promoted to executive producer starting with "The Nightmare Man".

In 2009, she produced the Doctor Who special "The Waters of Mars".

In 2011, she became the new producer of the series Casualty, taking over from previous producer Oliver Kent. Her first episode "Next of Kin" was aired on 3 December 2011 and her last episode "What You Believe" aired on 24 August 2013.

In 2014 after five years away from the programme, Wilson (alongside former producer Peter Bennett) returned to produce the eighth, ninth, and tenth seasons of the revived series, Wilson will produce the eleventh series under new executive producer Chris Chibnall.

== Producing credits ==
Production	Notes	Broadcaster
The Sarah Jane Adventures	Series Producer (2008–2011)	CBBC
Doctor Who	"The Waters of Mars" (2009); "Deep Breath" (2014); "Into the Dalek" (2014); "Robot of Sherwood" (2014); "The Caretaker" (2014); "Flatline" (2014); "Sleep No More" (2015); "Face the Raven" (2015); "The Husbands of River Song" (2015); "Thin Ice" (2017); "Knock Knock" (2017); "Oxygen" (2017); "The Lie of the Land" (2017); "Empress of Mars" (2017); "The Eaters of Light" (2017); "The Woman Who Fell to Earth" (2018); "The Ghost Monument" (2018); "Rosa" (2018); "The Tsuranga Conundrum" (2018); "Kerblam!" (2018); "It Takes You Away" (2018); "Resolution" (2019); "Spyfall" (2020); "Nikola Tesla's Night of Terror" (2020); "Fugitive of the Judoon" (2020); "Praxeus" (2020); "Ascension of the Cybermen" (2020); "The Timeless Children" (2020); "The Halloween Apocalypse" (2021); "War of the Sontarans" (2021); "Village of the Angels" (2021); "Legend of the Sea Devils" (2022); "The Power of the Doctor" (2022)	BBC One
Casualty	Series Producer (2011–2013)	BBC One
Death Valley	Producer	BBC One
