= The Ghost Monument =

278 – "The Ghost Monument"
- Doctor Who episode

Cast
- Doctor: Jodie Whittaker – Thirteenth Doctor
- Companions: Bradley Walsh – Graham O'Brien; Tosin Cole – Ryan Sinclair; Mandip Gill – Yasmin "Yaz" Khan
- Others: Susan Lynch – Angstrom; Shaun Dooley – Epzo; Art Malik – Ilin; Ian Gelder – Voice of the Remnants

Production
- Directed by: Mark Tonderai
- Written by: Chris Chibnall
- Produced by: Nikki Wilson
- Executive producers: Chris Chibnall; Matt Strevens; Sam Hoyle
- Music by: Segun Akinola
- Series: Series 11
- Running time: 49 minutes
- First broadcast: 14 October 2018

Chronology
← Preceded by "The Woman Who Fell to Earth"	Followed by → "Rosa"

"The Ghost Monument" is the second episode of the eleventh series of the British science fiction television programme Doctor Who. It was written by showrunner and executive producer Chris Chibnall, directed by Mark Tonderai, and first broadcast on BBC One on 14 October 2018.

In the episode, the Thirteenth Doctor (Jodie Whittaker), an alien time traveller, accidentally transports her human friends Graham O'Brien (Bradley Walsh), Ryan Sinclair (Tosin Cole), and Yasmin Khan (Mandip Gill) to a distant solar system, whereupon they become part of an interplanetary alien rally that crash lands at their final stop on the hostile planet of Desolation. Becoming involved in the race themselves, the Doctor and her friends find themselves seeking out the finish line, revealed to be the TARDIS, in order to get back to Earth.

"The Ghost Monument" is the first to air the programme's title sequence for Whittaker's tenure, which was omitted from the season's premiere, "The Woman Who Fell to Earth". The episode was viewed by 9.00 million viewers and received generally positive reviews from critics.

== Plot ==
After arriving in deep space by mistake, the Thirteenth Doctor and her friends are rescued by Angstrom and Epzo, two humanoid pilots competing in a large intergalactic race. Reaching the dead, yet hostile planet of Desolation, slightly removed from its gravity field, the group and pilots meet with the race's organiser Ilin, using a long-distance hologram. Both pilots learn that the race's final event involves reaching an object referred to as the Ghost Monument for extraction before the planet completes a single rotation. A curious Doctor learns from Ilin's data that it is the TARDIS, stuck in mid-phasing due to the damage it suffered. Joining the pilots in their race, the Doctor promises to get her new friends home once they have reached the finish line.

The group and the pilots locate and repair a solar-powered boat, using it to reach the ruins of a former civilisation that is now inhabited by sniper robots. The Doctor uses the remains of one robot to temporarily disable the others with an electromagnetic pulse, locating a series of tunnels the group can use as a shortcut to the finish line. During this time, the Doctor learns that Angstrom seeks the cash prize to save her family from ethnic cleansing by the Stenza, while Epzo is out for himself due to his upbringing to distrust others. Uncovering Desolation's history in the tunnels, the group learn that the residents died from creating weapons of mass destruction for the Stenza, with the dead cleared up by cloth-like creatures called the Remnants. Trapped by a group of Remnants when forced to a gas-ridden area on the surface, the Doctor destroys them with Epzo's self-lighting cigar igniting the gas.

Reaching the monument's location, the Doctor convinces the pilots to claim joint victory in Ilin's holographic tent. Ilin reluctantly agrees to this, but refuses to teleport the Doctor and her friends off the planet with the pilots. A despondent Doctor apologises to her friends for stranding them, but pauses when she hears the TARDIS emerging, using her sonic screwdriver to fully materialise it. With her ship returned, finding that it changed itself both externally and internally in her absence, the Doctor offers her friends a trip home as she promised.

== Production ==
=== Casting ===
Shaun Dooley was announced to be appearing in the series in July 2018, while after the premiere episode, "The Woman Who Fell to Earth", was broadcast, it was confirmed that Susan Lynch and Art Malik would be among a number of guest actors that would appear in the series.

=== Filming ===
Exterior shots for the episode took place within South Africa, marking the first time that Doctor Who conducted filming within the country. The choice of site by showrunner Chris Chibnall aimed to provide the right environment for this story, though this encountered issues when filming began in January 2018. One major issue faced by the cast and crew during the three weeks of exterior shooting was a severe drought that restricted cast members to two minutes for showers. The heat at the location also led to one member, Tosin Cole, to develop heatstroke, requiring treatment.

The interior scenes – including those involving Art Malik’s character Ilin – were primarily filmed back in the United Kingdom once the cast had finished in South Africa, at Cardiff’s Roath Lock Studios.

== Broadcast and reception ==
Professional ratings
Aggregate scores
Source	Rating
Rotten Tomatoes (Average Score)	7.54
Rotten Tomatoes (Tomatometer)	93%
Review scores
Source	Rating
Entertainment Weekly	B+
Daily Mirror	4/5 stars
IndieWire	A−
New York Magazine	3/5 stars
Radio Times	4/5 stars
The A.V. Club	B−
The Independent	4/5 stars
TV Fanatic	4.7/5

=== Television ===
The new opening title sequence was not included in the premiere episode, "The Woman Who Fell to Earth", but instead premiered in this episode.

=== Ratings ===
The episode was watched by 7.11 million viewers overnight, making it the third highest program of the week, accounting for an audience share of 33.4%. The episode received a total of 9.00 million viewers and an Audience Appreciation Index score of 82.

In the United States, the broadcast on BBC America had 1.12 million viewers for the night.

=== Critical reception ===
"The Ghost Monument" received positive reviews from critics. The episode holds an approval rating of 93% on Rotten Tomatoes, with an average score of 7.54. The website's consensus reads "The return of an old friend and a new nightmare-inducing monster make 'The Ghost Monument' both a powerful step forward and fun callback to the Doctors of yesteryear."
