= Shane Zaza =

British actor (born 1984)

- Born: 8 January 1984 (age 42); United Kingdom
- Occupation: Actor
- Spouse: Robyn Addison (m. 2016)

Shane Zaza (born 8 January 1984) is a British actor.

== Biography ==
He went to Headlands School in Bridlington, East Riding of Yorkshire where he first started acting. He lived a short walk to his school and was a very active child. Shane appeared as the lead actor at the Royal National Theatre in Behind the Beautiful Forevers.

In 2016, he appeared in "Nosedive", an episode of the anthology series Black Mirror.

He appeared in "Demons of the Punjab", an episode of the 11th season of Doctor Who and was a guest in an episode of the aftershow Doctor Who Access All Areas.

== Filmography ==
- The Da Vinci Code (2006)
- Love at First Sight (2011)

== Theatre ==
- In 2005, Shane played the role of Naz in the world premiere of Mercury Fur by Philip Ridley. The production, at the Menier Chocolate Factory, was directed by John Tiffany and featured Ben Whishaw in the lead role. Shane's acting was described as "shatteringly intense" by The Daily Telegraph and earned praise from The Guardian's Michael Billington for giving one of the production's "commanding performances"
- He played the lead role in Behind the Beautiful Forevers for the National Theatre in London. The Observer noted the strength of Zaza's physical performance. The Guardian described Zaza's performance as outstanding. The Independent described Zaza's performance as terrific.
- He played the title role in Henry V in a 2013 production at the Unicorn Theatre in London. The production and Zaza's performance were reviewed positively by The Guardian.
- Zaza appeared in a 2010 production of Macbeth at Shakespeare's Globe in London.
- In 2017, Zaza appeared in a revival of Jim Cartwright's play Road at the Royal Court Theatre
- In March 2018 he starred as Victor Frankenstein in the Royal Exchange production of Frankenstein, adapted by April De Angelis from the novel by Mary Shelley. The production was directed by Matthew Xia.
- In 2019, Zaza appeared in a revival of David Greig's Europe at the Donmar Warehouse, playing the character named Morocco.

== Television work ==
- Mouth to Mouth
- The Bill
- Black Mirror: "Nosedive"
- Casualty
- Dalziel and Pascoe
- Doctors
- Messiah
- Murphy's Law
- Spooks
- The Omid Djalili Show
- Waterloo Road
- Happy Valley
- Doctor Who: "Demons of the Punjab"
- Big Boys
- Invasion
