= Doctor Who series 11 =

2018 season of British sci-fi TV series

Doctor Who
- Series 11
- DVD box set cover art
- Showrunner: Chris Chibnall
- Starring: Jodie Whittaker; Bradley Walsh; Tosin Cole; Mandip Gill
- No. of stories: 10
- No. of episodes: 10 (+1 special)

Release
- Original network: BBC One
- Original release: 7 October – 9 December 2018

Series chronology
- ← Previous; Series 10 Next → Series 12

The eleventh series of the British science fiction television programme Doctor Who premiered on 7 October 2018 and concluded on 9 December 2018. The series is the first to be led by Chris Chibnall as head writer and executive producer, alongside executive producers Matt Strevens and Sam Hoyle, after Steven Moffat and Brian Minchin stepped down after the tenth series. This series is the eleventh to air following the programme's revival in 2005 and is the thirty-seventh season overall. It also marks the beginning of the third production era of the revived series, following Russell T Davies' original run from 2005 to 2010, and Moffat's from 2010 to 2017. The eleventh series was broadcast on Sundays, a first in the programme's history; regular episodes of the revived era were previously broadcast on Saturdays. The series was followed by a New Year's Day special episode, "Resolution", instead of the traditional annual Christmas Day special.

The series introduces Jodie Whittaker as the Thirteenth Doctor, a new incarnation of the Doctor, an alien Time Lord who travels through time and space in her TARDIS, which appears to be a British police box on the outside. The series also introduces Bradley Walsh, Tosin Cole, and Mandip Gill as the Doctor's newest travelling companions, Graham O'Brien, Ryan Sinclair, and Yasmin Khan, respectively. The series follows the Thirteenth Doctor as she initially searches for her lost TARDIS, inadvertently bringing Graham, Ryan, and Yasmin with her on her travels. All three later contemplate returning to their normal lives but decide to continue travelling with the Doctor. Rather than an overall story arc similar to those in previous series, each episode of the series served mostly as a standalone story.

With the exception of Chibnall, every writer and director who worked on the eleventh series was new to the programme. The ten episodes were directed by Jamie Childs, Mark Tonderai, Sallie Aprahamian, and Jennifer Perrott, and written by Malorie Blackman, Ed Hime, Pete McTighe, Vinay Patel, Joy Wilkinson, and Chris Chibnall, who wrote five episodes for the series solo, co-writing an additional episode with Blackman. Filming for the series commenced in October 2017 and concluded in August 2018.

== Episodes ==
For the first time since the seventh series, and thus the second time in the programme's history, each episode of the series served mostly as a standalone story with no multi-parters.

No. story	No. in series	Title	Directed by	Written by	Original release date	UK viewers (millions)	AI
277	1	"The Woman Who Fell to Earth"	Jamie Childs	Chris Chibnall	7 October 2018	10.96	83
Ryan Sinclair, a warehouse packer with dyspraxia, calls the police, receiving help from PC Yasmin Khan, his old friend, after a blue pod appears. Ryan's grandmother Grace O'Brien, her husband, Graham, and Karl, a crane worker, find themselves trapped on board their train with a floating orb of tentacles and electricity. Ryan and Yasmin head for the train, arriving just as the Doctor falls through the ceiling. The orb departs after implanting everyone with DNA destroying bombs. The Doctor and others track the pod down to a warehouse, where they encounter a humanoid alien. The Doctor constructs a new sonic screwdriver from spare parts. The group intercepts the orb, a mass of biological data-gathering coils. The second alien suddenly appears, revealing himself as Tzim-Sha, nicknamed "Tim Shaw", a warrior of the Stenza race. The group track down Karl. Tzim-Sha captures Karl, but the Doctor confronts Tzim-Sha. Tzim-Sha detonates the bombs, but the Doctor transferred them into the coils, which were self-implanted into Tzim-Sha. Grace destroys the coils and dies. The Doctor later tells the group she must find the TARDIS. She leaves, but accidentally teleports all four of them into deep space.
278	2	"The Ghost Monument"	Mark Tonderai	Chris Chibnall	14 October 2018	9.00	82
The Doctor and others are rescued by Angstrom and Epzo, pilots competing in an intergalactic race. Reaching the hostile planet of Desolation, the group and pilots meet with the race's organiser Ilin. They learn that the race's final event involves reaching the Ghost Monument for extraction before the planet completes a single rotation. The Doctor learns that it is the TARDIS, stuck in mid-phasing. Joining the pilots, the Doctor promises to get her new friends home. The group and the pilots locate and repair a solar-powered boat, using it to reach the ruins of a former civilisation, now inhabited by sniper robots. The Doctor uses the remains of one robot to disable all of the others with an electromagnetic pulse, locating a series of tunnels to use as a shortcut. Trapped by a group of Remnants, cloth-like creatures, the Doctor destroys them with Epzo's self-lighting cigar. Reaching the monument's location, the pilots claim joint victory. Ilin reluctantly agrees to this but refuses to teleport the Doctor and her friends off the planet. The Doctor then hears the TARDIS emerging, using her sonic screwdriver to fully materialise it, and the Doctor offers her friends a trip home as she promised.
279	3	"Rosa"	Mark Tonderai	Malorie Blackman and Chris Chibnall	21 October 2018	8.41	83
When the Doctor attempts to return to Sheffield, the TARDIS instead takes her to Montgomery, Alabama, in 1955. The Doctor finds traces of time travel energy in the area. Investigating, the group learns that they have arrived the day before Rosa Parks refused to give up her seat as bus driver James F. Blake demanded, influencing the civil rights movement. Tracing the energy, the group locates a suitcase of equipment from the future but are forced to flee from its owner, a rehabilitated murderer named Krasko, who is attempting to change history by ensuring Parks never had to refuse her seat. Destroying the vortex manipulator he used, the Doctor and her friends focus on thwarting him by ensuring Parks refuses her seat to Blake. While Ryan removes false notices at bus stops, he encounters Krasko blocking the bus route. Ryan uses Krasko's displacement device to send him into the past. Removing the blockage, he and the others rejoin the Doctor on the bus as passengers. As the moment arrives, the Doctor realises they have become forced to stay aboard the bus. The police arrest Parks for violating segregation laws, and history has been kept intact.
280	4	"Arachnids in the UK"	Sallie Aprahamian	Chris Chibnall	28 October 2018	8.22	83
Having returned to Sheffield, the Doctor meets Yasmin's family, while Graham heads home to grieve over Grace. After Yasmin leaves to pick up her mother, Najia Khan, the Doctor and Ryan encounter arachnologist Jade McIntyre. The group discovers that a large spider killed McIntyre's colleague. After Graham rejoins them, the group learns that McIntyre has been investigating bizarre behaviour in spider ecosystems. The Doctor deduces that the spiders are linked to a luxury hotel complex, which Najia worked at until fired by its owner Robertson. Arriving at the hotel and joined by Robertson, the group learns the spiders have infested the complex. The spiders came from abandoned mine tunnels beneath the complex, which was used as a dumping ground for industrial waste. McIntyre, whose experiments involved genetically modified spiders, realises the giant spiders are offspring of a specimen that had been dumped there, the toxicity of the dumping ground mutating them. The group lures the offspring into a panic room, before encountering the specimen itself in the ballroom. Before the Doctor can deal with it, Robertson kills it with a gun. Ryan, Yasmin and Graham decide to see more of the universe with the Doctor.
281	5	"The Tsuranga Conundrum"	Jennifer Perrott	Chris Chibnall	4 November 2018	7.76	79
While scavenging on an alien junkyard planet, the Doctor, Graham, Yasmin, and Ryan are caught in a sonic mine's detonation. They wake aboard the Tsuranga, a spaceship travelling to a medical space station. The Doctor meets the patients - Eve Cicero, a renowned general; her brother Durkas; Eve's synth robot partner Ronan; and Yoss, a pregnant man. The Doctor and head nurse Astos gain access to the ship's systems and notice an alien entity heading for the ship. Astos becomes trapped in a pod and dies when the pod is jettisoned and explodes. Mabli, Astos' colleague, tells the Doctor that the entity is a Pting, a creature that eats any non-organic material. While Yasmin and Ronan defend the ship's anti-matter power source, Ryan and Graham help Yoss as he enters labour. Eve, who has a critical heart condition, sacrifices herself to pilot the ship through a dangerous asteroid field. The Doctor finds a bomb attached to the ship's power source, removes it, and tricks the Pting into eating it, ensuring that the energy of the blast feeds the creature before jettisoning it into space. The Tsuranga safely arrives at the space station, and the group honours the death of Eve.
282	6	"Demons of the Punjab"	Jamie Childs	Vinay Patel	11 November 2018	7.48	80
After talking with her grandmother Umbreen, Yaz is curious about her deceased Muslim grandfather. The group arrives in Punjab in August 1947, and Yaz is shocked to learn Umbreen will marry a Hindu man, Prem. The Doctor learns the group arrived on 14 August, the day before the partition of India. The Doctor sees flashes of two aliens, and she finds them with the dead body of a sadhu, Bhakti. Joined by Prem, who saw the "demons" during the Battle of Singapore, the Doctor assumes they killed Bhakti and recognizes them as Thijarian, a race of assassins. After the Doctor is teleported back to their ship while the others prepare for the wedding, she learns the Thijarians are the last of their kind, acting as witnesses to those who die alone, and they show the Doctor that Bhakti was murdered by Prem's brother Manish, a Hindu nationalist who opposes the wedding. After the wedding, the Doctor accosts Manish for the crime, and he calls some armed colleagues. The Doctor and her friends help Umbreen escape, while Prem remains behind to reason with Manish. One of the nationalists murders Prem, as the travellers return to the present.
283	7	"Kerblam!"	Jennifer Perrott	Pete McTighe	18 November 2018	7.46	81
The group travels to Kerblam!, a galaxy-wide online shopping service consisting of automated warehouses and a robotic workforce. As new employees, the group attempt to find out who had sent them a call for help. They learn from their new colleagues – Dan in delivery, Kira in dispatch, and Charlie in maintenance – that staff have been vanishing. When Dan disappears, the Doctor suspects something is wrong with the company's artificial intelligence. When Kira is abducted, the Doctor tracks her, and she finds the remains of the missing workforce and an army of bots. With an early model of the bot, she learns the AI called for her help directly. Yasmin, Ryan, and Charlie witness Kira die when playing with bubble wrap, and the Doctor discovers someone weaponised the material. Charlie, the culprit, used the staff as test subjects, intending to use the bubble wrap upon the company's customers, knowing that blame would be placed upon automation and a lack of human diligence, his motive to prevent automation making human workforces redundant. The Doctor re-programmes the bots to deliver to themselves, and the floor is destroyed. Maddox and Slade undertake to rebuild Kerblam! with a mostly human workforce.
284	8	"The Witchfinders"	Sallie Aprahamian	Joy Wilkinson	25 November 2018	7.21	81
The group arrives in Lancashire in 1612, landing near Pendle Hill. They observe Becka Savage duck her grandmother as a witch. To prevent further trials, the Doctor informs Savage she is the Witchfinder General, only to be greeted by King James I, who is paranoid and obsessed with witches. Yasmin meets with Savage's cousin Willa and protects her when a tendril attacks them. The Doctor discovers that an alien entity has possessed trial victims. Savage reveals she was infected with the entity whilst chopping down a tree on the Hill. The trial victims arrive and possess her; Savage, now completely taken over, identifies the entity as the Morax and herself as queen. The Doctor discovers that Savage damaged a high-tech jail on the Hill, which the Morax had been imprisoned. Learning that they intend to have their king possess James, the Doctor uses the tree Savage took to fight them back. The group rescues James and re-establish the jail, imprisoning the Morax. James declares that all records of the event will be erased, and he and Willa watch as the group leave in the TARDIS.
285	9	"It Takes You Away"	Jamie Childs	Ed Hime	2 December 2018	6.42	80
The group arrives in Norway. Meeting blind teen Hanne, they learn that she and her father Erik moved following the death of her mother Trine and that her father is missing. They discover a mirror with no reflections; the mirror is a portal. The Doctor, Graham and Yasmin enter, while Ryan remains behind. Hanne knocks him out and follows them, forcing Ryan to follow. The group finds themselves in the Anti-Zone, a buffer-space between universes to prevent catastrophic damage, which they quickly escape by entering another portal. They find themselves in a cabin within a parallel universe, and encounter Erik talking with Trine, and Graham encounters Grace. The Doctor deduces they have encountered the Solitract, a sentient universe incompatible with the real one. When Hanne arrives and recognises Trine is not real, the Doctor convinces the Solitract to release them. The Doctor offers the Solitract her experience of travelling the universe, leaving the Doctor in a white space along with a talking frog, a form of the Solitract. She explains she can't stay and makes her way back through the Anti-Zone before the portal collapses. Erik returns to Oslo with Hanne, while Ryan bonds with Graham.
286	10	"The Battle of Ranskoor Av Kolos"	Jamie Childs	Chris Chibnall	9 December 2018	6.65	79
The TARDIS lands on Ranskoor Av Kolos, a planet with a psychic field that alters one's perception of reality; the Doctor provides her companions with counteracting neurobalancers. They come across an amnesiac pilot, Paltraki. Paltraki gets a video signal from a woman, Andinio, and Tzim-Sha, who warns Paltraki to bring him an item, a rock floating in a protective shell, in exchange for his crew. Graham and Ryan look for the crew, while the Doctor, Yasmin, and Paltraki seek Tzim-Sha. They encounter Andinio, who takes them to Tzim-Sha and Delph; Andinio and Delph are the Ux, a telekinetic race. Tzim-Sha has been trapped on Ranskoor and the Ux consider him their "creator"; he has had them shrink planets to tiny objects: the item from Paltraki's ship. Yasmin and Paltraki discover four similar planets, while Tzim-Sha begins the same to Earth. The Doctor convinces the Ux to stop the process and help her return the planets. Graham and Ryan find the crew in stasis chambers, Ryan leads the crew to safety, and they stow Tzim-Sha in a stasis chamber. The Doctor, the Ux, and Paltraki's crew work together to return the planets, and the Doctor and her companions leave.
Special
287	–	"Resolution"	Wayne Yip	Chris Chibnall	1 January 2019	7.13	80
On New Year's Day 2019 in Sheffield, archaeologists Lin and Mitch unintentionally revive a deadly intelligence that has been separated and dormant on Earth since the 9th century. The Doctor is alerted to its presence and lands the TARDIS at Lin and Mitch's dig. The Doctor takes a sample of the creature's slime, while the squid-like creature attaches itself to Lin's back. At Graham and Ryan's home, the latter's father Aaron returns. Ryan agrees to talk to him, while the Doctor discovers that the creature she faces is a Dalek. Controlling Lin, the Dalek steals a ray gun belonging to its race from an archive base and constructs a makeshift Dalek casing out of scrap metal. The Doctor and her friends find Lin, freed from the Dalek's control, and the Doctor confronts the rebuilt creature. The Dalek flies off and attempts to summon a battle fleet, but the Doctor follows and defeats it with the help of Aaron's microwave oven. The exposed mutant creature possesses Aaron in an attempt to force the Doctor to take it to Skaro, but she releases it into a supernova instead. Afterward, Aaron and Ryan reconcile.

== Casting ==
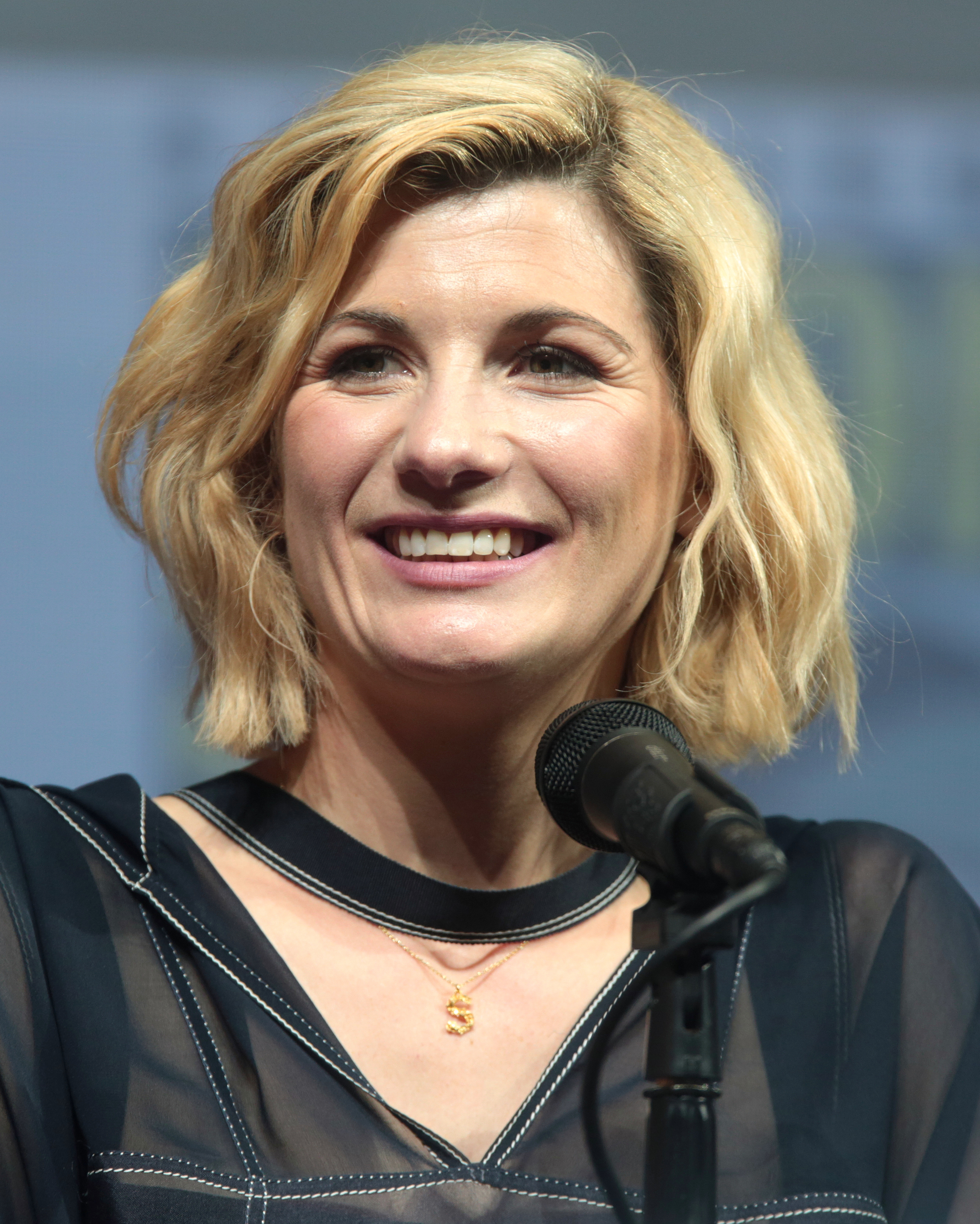
Whittaker at the 2018 San Diego Comic-Con, where she promoted her first full series.

The series introduced Jodie Whittaker as the Thirteenth Doctor. Her predecessor Peter Capaldi departed from his role as the Twelfth Doctor after the tenth series, having played the role for three series. His final appearance was in the 2017 Christmas special, "Twice Upon a Time". Moffat stated in February 2017 that Chibnall tried to persuade the actor to continue into the eleventh series, but despite this, Capaldi still decided to depart.

We'll cast the role in the traditional way: write the script, then go and find the best person for that part in that script. You couldn't go out and cast an abstract idea...The creative possibilities are endless, but I have a very clear sense of what we're going to do, without even knowing who's going to play the part.

— Chris Chibnall, executive producer, on the approach to casting the newest incarnation of the lead character.

The search for the actor to portray the Thirteenth Doctor, led by Chibnall, began later in 2017 after he completed work on the third series of the ITV series Broadchurch, for which he was also the head writer and executive producer. Chibnall had the final say on the actor, although the decision also involved Charlotte Moore and Piers Wenger, the director of content and head of drama for the BBC respectively. On 16 July 2017, it was announced after the 2017 Wimbledon Championships men's finals that Whittaker would portray the thirteenth incarnation of the Doctor.

After the tenth series concluded, it was confirmed that neither Matt Lucas nor Pearl Mackie would be reprising their roles for the eleventh series as companions Nardole and Bill Potts. Consequently, the eleventh series introduced a new set of companions, including Bradley Walsh, Tosin Cole, and Mandip Gill as Graham O'Brien, Ryan Sinclair, and Yasmin Khan, respectively. Walsh had been a favourite for the role since rumours of his casting began in August 2017. Actress Sharon D. Clarke also had a recurring role throughout the series as Graham's wife Grace.

On 8 March 2018, Alan Cumming announced that he had been cast as King James I in an episode of the series. On 25 March, comedian Lee Mack stated that he would make a brief appearance in one episode. Shaun Dooley also appeared in the series. In a "Coming Soon" vignette during the closing credits of the premiere episode, "The Woman Who Fell to Earth", a number of guest actors appearing in the remaining episodes of the series were shown: Mark Addy, Julie Hesmondhalgh, Shane Zaza, Shobna Gulati, Brett Goldstein, Josh Bowman, Siobhan Finneran, Lois Chimimba, Susan Lynch, Hamza Jeetooa (credited as Hamza Jeetoa), Art Malik, Suzanne Packer, Vinette Robinson, Amita Suman, Ben Bailey Smith, Phyllis Logan, and Chris Noth. Other appearances in the season included Kevin Eldon, Matthew Gravelle, Claudia Jessie, Samuel Oatley, Trevor White, Leena Dhingra, and Jonny Dixon.

== Production ==
=== Development ===
In April 2015, Steven Moffat confirmed that Doctor Who would run for at least another five years, extending the show until 2020. It was announced in January 2016 that the tenth series would be Moffat's final series as executive producer and head writer, after seven years as showrunner, for which he was replaced in the role by Chris Chibnall in 2018. Matt Strevens served as executive producer alongside Chibnall, as well as Sam Hoyle. With Moffat's departure from the role of head writer, he also stated in February 2017 that he was not planning to write in a regular capacity for the eleventh series.

The series consisted of 10 episodes, a shorter run compared to the 12 and 13 episodes that have comprised the previous ten series of the revived era. Episodes ran for an average of 50 minutes each, with the premiere running for 64 minutes, described by the BBC as "feature-length". Chibnall stated at the 2018 San Diego Comic-Con that each episode of the series was set to be a standalone story with no multi-parters.

=== Writing ===
In July 2018, it was announced that the writing team for the eleventh series would include people from black and minority ethnic backgrounds for the first time in the programme's history, including two women and three men contributing as guest writers, while the series as a whole would feature an equal split between female and male directors. All but one of the editors for the eleventh series were women. Chibnall and Strevens stated that it was a priority to have a diverse production team.

The writers and directors for the show were officially announced in an issue of Doctor Who Magazine in August 2018. Malorie Blackman, Ed Hime, Pete McTighe, Vinay Patel, and Joy Wilkinson all contributed scripts to the series.

In July 2018, Chibnall also stated that the series would not feature the Daleks; the following December, the BBC announced that the New Year's Day special would feature the return of the Daleks.

=== Design changes ===
New Doctor Who logo and insignia for the eleventh series

A new logo was unveiled at the BBC Worldwide showcase on 20 February 2018. This logo was designed by the creative agency Little Hawk, who also created a stylised insignia of the word "who" enclosed in a circle with an intersecting line. Visual effects were done by the British company DNEG. The new opening title sequence was not included in the premiere episode, "The Woman Who Fell to Earth", and instead first appeared in the second episode, "The Ghost Monument".

=== Filming ===
Pre-production for the eleventh series began in late October 2017. Filming officially began on 31 October 2017, and concluded on 3 August 2018. Jamie Childs directed the first and ninth episode of the series in the opening production block, having directed Whittaker's introduction video as the Thirteenth Doctor. Sallie Aprahamian directed the third filming block, consisting of two episodes.

The eleventh series was shot using Cooke and Angénieux anamorphic lenses for the first time in the series' history, a creative decision made in order to make the show look more cinematic.

In November 2017, the production team visited parts of Sheffield, where they filmed a majority of "The Woman Who Fell To Earth". In January 2018, the cast and crew flew abroad to Cape Town, South Africa, where they filmed the exterior shots for the second episode, "The Ghost Monument". This was the first time that Doctor Who filmed there. In the same production block, the third episode, "Rosa", was also filmed in South Africa. In February 2018, the production team returned to Sheffield where they filmed parts of "Arachnids in the UK". The exterior of the Park Hill estate, Sheffield, was used prominently in the filming. In March 2018, the production team travelled to Gosport, where they filmed parts of "The Witchfinders". Australian director Jennifer Perrott visited the UK to film the fifth episode, "The Tsuranga Conundrum", along with the seventh episode "Kerblam!". The sixth episode, "Demons of the Punjab", was filmed in the Province of Granada, Spain.

A New Year's Day special episode, "Resolution", was filmed in 2018 in lieu of the traditional annual Christmas special.

Production blocks were arranged as follows:

Block	Episode(s)	Director	Writer(s)	Producer
1	Episode 1: "The Woman Who Fell to Earth"	Jamie Childs	Chris Chibnall	Nikki Wilson
1	Episode 9: "It Takes You Away"	Jamie Childs	Ed Hime	Nikki Wilson
2	Episode 2: "The Ghost Monument"	Mark Tonderai	Chris Chibnall	Nikki Wilson
2	Episode 3: "Rosa"	Mark Tonderai	Malorie Blackman and Chris Chibnall	Nikki Wilson
3	Episode 4: "Arachnids in the UK"	Sallie Aprahamian	Chris Chibnall	Alex Mercer
3	Episode 8: "The Witchfinders"	Sallie Aprahamian	Joy Wilkinson	Alex Mercer
4	Episode 5: "The Tsuranga Conundrum"	Jennifer Perrott	Chris Chibnall	Nikki Wilson
4	Episode 7: "Kerblam!"	Jennifer Perrott	Pete McTighe	Nikki Wilson
5	Episode 6: "Demons of the Punjab"	Jamie Childs	Vinay Patel	Alex Mercer
5	Episode 10: "The Battle of Ranskoor Av Kolos"	Jamie Childs	Chris Chibnall	Alex Mercer
X	New Year's special: "Resolution"	Wayne Yip	Chris Chibnall	Nikki Wilson

=== Leak ===
A source that was linked to the social media platform Tapatalk, leaked unauthorized scenes and footage from the series to numerous websites and fan-based entities. The leaked details were revealed on 26 June 2018, prompting mixed results from fans of the series, especially with the spoilers from the series' future episodes. On 2 July, the BBC, through the representation of an American law firm, filed federal court papers in California and ordered a subpoena. It asked the United States Federal Court to compel Tapatalk to disclose records that could identify the source of the leak.

=== Music ===
Murray Gold announced in February 2018 that he would step down as the programme's composer, having served as the musical director since 2005, and that he would not be composing the music for the eleventh series. On 26 June 2018, producer Chris Chibnall announced that the musical score for the eleventh series would be provided by Royal Birmingham Conservatoire alumnus Segun Akinola. "Glorious", by Macklemore and Skylar Grey, was used in a number of the trailers for the eleventh series.

== Release ==
=== Promotion ===
On 16 July 2017, a minute-long clip was released on the Doctor Who website, after the 2017 Wimbledon Championships men's finals, introducing Jodie Whittaker as the Thirteenth Doctor. The first teaser for the series was released during the final of the 2018 FIFA World Cup on 15 July 2018, almost exactly a year following the official announcement. Whittaker, Gill, Cole, Chibnall, and Strevens promoted the show with a panel at San Diego Comic-Con on 19 July 2018, where the first trailer was released. The second trailer for the series was released on 20 September 2018. The premiere of the new series was held at The Moor, Sheffield on 24 September 2018, as part of a red carpet event for the first episode and eleventh series.

=== Broadcast ===
The eleventh series premiered on 7 October 2018 and concluded on 9 December 2018. The series was broadcast on Sundays; the move to Sundays was a first in the programme's history after regular episodes of the entire revived era were previously broadcast on Saturdays. However, the move from Saturdays was not a first in the programme's history, after episodes were moved from a Saturday broadcast to weeknights during the eras of the Fifth and Seventh Doctors.

"The Woman Who Fell to Earth" was released in the Brazilian cinemas on 7 October 2018, in Russian, Ukrainian, Belarusian, Kazakhstani, and Azerbaijani cinemas on 7–8 October, in select Australian cinemas on 8 October, and in the United States on 10–11 October.

=== Aftershow ===
The series 10 companion series, Doctor Who: The Fan Show, did not return, but each episode was complemented by a behind the scenes YouTube video presented by Yinka Bokinni, entitled Doctor Who Access All Areas. Episodes of Access All Areas are between 4 and 7 minutes long, and were released between 13 October and 13 December.and a one-off was released on the 26 May 2025 and was presented by Varada Sethu.

=== Children in Need special ===
On 7 August 2018, it was reported by Cultbox that a sketch was recorded by the Doctor Who cast and crew for the 2018 Children in Need. The sketch aired during Children in Need on 16 November 2018, titled Anna's Doctor Who Surprise. Nine-year-old Anna Mark, who has cystic fibrosis, and her brother Alex visited the TARDIS and the Doctor Who set in Cardiff, meeting Gill, Cole, Walsh, and Whittaker during their tour.

=== Home media ===
The eleventh series was released on home media on 14 January 2019 in Region 2, with the 2019 special "Resolution" released separately on 18 February. "Resolution" was also included in the twelfth series box set, released in May 2020.

- ^{(D,B)} indicates a simultaneous DVD and Blu-ray release

Series	Story no.	Episode name	Duration	Release date		
Series	Story no.	Episode name	Duration	R2	R4	R1
11	277–286	Doctor Who: The Complete Eleventh Series	9 × 50 min. 1 × 65 min.	14 January 2019^{(D,B)}	6 February 2019^{(D,B)}	29 January 2019^{(D,B)}
11	287	Doctor Who: "Resolution"	1 × 60 min.	18 February 2019^{(D,B)}	6 March 2019^{(D,B)}	19 February 2019^{(D,B)}
11, 12, 13, 2022 specials	277–300	Doctor Who: The Complete Jodie Whittaker Years (DVD includes "Twice Upon a Time")	20 × 50 min. 1 × 55 min. 7 × 60 min. 2 × 65 min. 1 × 70 min. 1 × 90 min.	—N/a	—N/a	25 April 2023^{(D)} 5 November 2024^{(B)}

== In print ==
Series	Story no.	Novelisation title	Author	Original publisher	Paperback release date	Audiobook	
Series	Story no.	Novelisation title	Author	Original publisher	Paperback release date	Release date (Note: Unabridged from BBC Audio / AudioGo unless otherwise indicated)	Narrator
11	283	Kerblam!	Pete McTighe	BBC Books (Target collection)	13 July 2023	3 August 2023	Julie Hesmondhalgh
11	284	The Witchfinders	Joy Wilkinson	BBC Books (Target collection)	11 March 2021		Sophie Aldred

== Reception ==
=== Ratings ===
The premiere episode, "The Woman Who Fell to Earth", received a total of 10.96 million viewers, making it the highest series premiere for a Doctor in the history of the programme, and the highest consolidated ratings since "The Time of the Doctor" (2013). In December 2018, the BBC released details for the top ten requested episodes on iPlayer for the month of October; "The Woman Who Fell to Earth" ranked second with 2.96 million requests, with the premiere episode of Killing Eve ranking first. In January 2019, BBC released a report for BBC iPlayer requests in 2018; Doctor Who ranked as the fourth most popular series, according to the released figures.

No.	Title	Air date	Overnight ratings		Consolidated ratings		Total viewers (millions)	28-day viewers (millions)	AI	Ref(s)
No.	Title	Air date	Viewers (millions)	Rank	Viewers (millions)	Rank	Total viewers (millions)	28-day viewers (millions)	AI	Ref(s)
1	"The Woman Who Fell to Earth"	7 October 2018	8.20	2	2.76	1	10.960 (Note: Episode 1, total viewers: 10.535m on TV, 234k on PC, 110k on Tablet, 80k on Smartphone)	11.456 (Note: Episode 1, 28-day viewers: 10.930m on TV, 286k on PC, 139k on Tablet, 102k on Smartphone)	83	
2	"The Ghost Monument"	14 October 2018	7.11	2	1.89	4	9.002 (Note: Episode 2, total viewers: 8.670m on TV, 184k on PC, 83k on Tablet, 64k on Smartphone)	9.807 (Note: Episode 2, 28-day viewers: 9.382m on TV, 232k on PC, 110k on Tablet, 84k on Smartphone)	82	
3	"Rosa"	21 October 2018	6.39	2	1.98	4	8.410 (Note: Episode 3, total viewers: 8.088m on TV, 176k on PC, 82k on Tablet, 63k on Smartphone)	9.006 (Note: Episode 3, 28-day viewers: 8.609m on TV, 215k on PC, 102k on Tablet, 79k on Smartphone)	83	
4	"Arachnids in the UK"	28 October 2018	6.43	2	1.79	4	8.219 (Note: Episode 4, total viewers: 7.974m on TV, 131k on PC, 62k on Tablet, 51k on Smartphone)	8.702 (Note: Episode 4, 28-day viewers: 8.396m on TV, 163k on PC, 79k on Tablet, 64k on Smartphone)	83	
5	"The Tsuranga Conundrum"	4 November 2018	6.12	2	1.64	6	7.761 (Note: Episode 5, total viewers: 7.494m on TV, 148k on PC, 66k on Tablet, 53k on Smartphone)	8.320 (Note: Episode 5, 28-day viewers: 7.996m on TV, 176k on PC, 82k on Tablet, 66k on Smartphone)	79	
6	"Demons of the Punjab"	11 November 2018	5.77	3	1.71	8	7.484 (Note: Episode 6, total viewers: 7.233m on TV, 139k on PC, 61k on Tablet, 51k on Smartphone)	7.999 (Note: Episode 6, 28-day viewers: 7.699m on TV, 159k on PC, 77k on Tablet, 64k on Smartphone)	80	
7	"Kerblam!"	18 November 2018	5.93	4	1.53	9	7.458 (Note: Episode 7, total viewers: 7.225m on TV, 120k on PC, 61k on Tablet, 52k on Smartphone)	8.055 (Note: Episode 7, 28-day viewers: 7.776m on TV, 138k on PC, 76k on Tablet, 64k on Smartphone)	81	
8	"The Witchfinders"	25 November 2018	5.66	4	1.55	17	7.212 (Note: Episode 8, total viewers: 7.029m on TV, 78k on PC, 57k on Tablet, 48k on Smartphone)	7.648 (Note: Episode 8, 28-day viewers: 7.424m on TV, 94k on PC, 71k on Tablet, 59k on Smartphone)	81	
9	"It Takes You Away"	2 December 2018	5.07	5	1.35	22	6.421 (Note: Episode 9, total viewers: 6.242m on TV, 77k on PC, 55k on Tablet, 47k on Smartphone)	6.785 (Note: Episode 9, 28-day viewers: 6.569m on TV, 92k on PC, 67k on Tablet, 57k on Smartphone)	80	
10	"The Battle of Ranskoor Av Kolos"	9 December 2018	5.32	4	1.33	18	6.649 (Note: Episode 10, total viewers: 6.481m on TV, 73k on PC, 51k on Tablet, 44k on Smartphone)	7.142 (Note: Episode 10, 28-day viewers: 6.931m on TV, 89k on PC, 66k on Tablet, 56k on Smartphone)	79	
–	"Resolution"	1 January 2019	5.15	4	1.98	14	7.126 (Note: Special episode, total viewers: 6.955m on TV, 73k on PC, 54k on Tablet, 44k on Smartphone)	7.361 (Note: Special episode, total viewers: 7.154m on TV, 90k on PC, 63k on Tablet, 53k on Smartphone)	80	

=== Critical reception ===
Doctor Who series 11: Critical reception by episode
Series 11 (2018): Percentage of positive critics' reviews tracked by the website Rotten Tomatoes

Doctor Who's eleventh series has received positive reviews from critics. Series 11 holds a 90% approval rating on online review aggregate site Rotten Tomatoes with an average score of 7.37/10, based on 41 critic reviews. The site's consensus reads "Carried by Jodie Whittaker's boundless energy and charm, Doctor Who's latest regeneration manages to feel fresh well into its 55-year tenure." On Metacritic, the series holds a weighted average score of 78 out of 100 based on ten reviews, indicating "generally favorable reviews".

Kaitlin Thomas of TV Guide praised Jodie Whittaker's "passion and fire", but felt the series was failing the companions; it "hasn't done much to develop them", and, "after four episodes, they're all still the same barely-there characters they were at the start".

=== Awards and nominations ===
Year	Award	Category	Nominee(s)	Result	Ref(s)
2018	23rd Satellite Awards	Best Television Series – Genre	Doctor Who	Nominated	
2018	23rd Satellite Awards	Best Actress – Television Series Drama	Jodie Whittaker	Nominated	
2019	BAFTA Cymru	Outstanding Actress	Jodie Whittaker	Nominated	
2019	BAFTA Cymru	Excellence in Production Design	Arwel Wyn Jones	Nominated	
2019	BAFTA Cymru	Outstanding Television Drama	Doctor Who	Nominated	
2019	BAFTA TV Awards	Virgin Media's Must-See Moment	"Rosa"	Nominated	
2019	Hugo Awards	Hugo Award for Best Dramatic Presentation (Short Form)	Malorie Blackman and Chris Chibnall for "Rosa"	Nominated	
2019	Hugo Awards	Hugo Award for Best Dramatic Presentation (Short Form)	Vinay Patel for "Demons of the Punjab"	Nominated	
2019	National Television Award	Best Dramatic Performance	Jodie Whittaker	Nominated	
2019	Saturn Awards	Best Science Fiction Television Series	Doctor Who	Nominated	
2019	Saturn Awards	Best Actress on a Television Series	Jodie Whittaker	Nominated	
2019	Saturn Awards	Best Performance by a Younger Actor on a Television Series	Tosin Cole	Nominated	
2019	TV Quick Awards	Best Family Drama	Doctor Who	Nominated	
2019	TV Quick Awards	Best Actress	Jodie Whittaker	Nominated	
2019	Visionary Arts Organisation Award	Television Show of the Year	"Rosa"	Won	

== Soundtrack ==
A singular soundtrack release, titled "Thirteen", the Thirteenth Doctor's theme, was released on 12 December 2018 by Silva Screen Records. 40 further selected pieces of score from this series as composed by Segun Akinola, were released in a 2-CD set on 11 January 2019 by Silva Screen Records, including two tracks from the 2019 New Year's special "Resolution".

Doctor Who: Series 11

Soundtrack album by Segun Akinola
- Released: 11 January 2019
- Recorded: 2018
- Genre: Soundtrack
- Length: 153:02
- Label: Silva Screen Records
- Producer: Segun Akinola

Doctor Who soundtrack chronology
Doctor Who: The Five Doctors (2018)	Doctor Who: Series 11 (2019)	Doctor Who: Series 12 (2020)

All tracks are written by Segun Akinola, except where noted.

Disc 1
No.	Title	Episode	Length
1.	"Series 11 Opening Titles" (Ron Grainer arr. Segun Akinola)	Various episodes	0:40
2.	"Getting That Bike"	"The Woman Who Fell to Earth"	2:04
3.	"Long Story"	″	1:18
4.	"This New Nose Is So Unreliable"	″	2:57
5.	"The Warrior"	″	2:38
6.	"Sonic Screwdriver"	″	1:07
7.	"The Doctor"	″	3:26
8.	"You Really Need to Get Out of Those Clothes"	″	2:22
9.	"Three Suns"	"The Ghost Monument"	2:28
10.	"Make It Through Those Ruins"	″	3:54
11.	"My Beautiful Ghost Monument"	″	3:54
12.	"Missing You"	"Arachnids in the UK"	0:43
13.	"Insurance Policy"	″	4:34
14.	"My Fam"	″	3:32
15.	"Tsuranga"	"The Tsuranga Conundrum"	6:24
16.	"Resus One"	″	7:30
17.	"Kerblam!"	"Kerblam!"	7:59
18.	"Help In Dispatch"	″	5:08
19.	"Ranskoor Av Kolos"	"The Battle of Ranskoor Av Kolos"	2:16
20.	"The Shrine"	″	5:04
21.	"Keep Your Faith"	″	8:01
Total length:			77:59

Disc 2
No.	Title	Episode	Length
1.	"Thirteen"	Various episodes	2:14
2.	"Get Out That Door"	"Rosa"	1:55
3.	"Parks, Rosa Parks"	″	2:30
4.	"Artron Energy"	″	0:52
5.	"This Is Very Bad News"	″	3:56
6.	"Fishing Take Down"	″	1:18
7.	"Stand Up Now"	″	3:10
8.	"A Living Icon for Freedom"	″	1:17
9.	"Umbreen"	"Demons of the Punjab"	2:05
10.	"Thijarian Hive"	″	5:09
11.	"I Love You Nani"	″	8:19
12.	"Yaz And Nani End Credits" (Ron Grainer arr. Segun Akinola)	″	0:49
13.	"King James"	"The Witchfinders"	3:19
14.	"Tendril"	″	0:44
15.	"Morax"	″	7:33
16.	"Reverse the Polarity"	"It Takes You Away"	7:27
17.	"Made a New Friend"	″	3:03
18.	"Rebuilt"	"Resolution"	8:10
19.	"Me and My Mates"	″	10:21
20.	"Series 11 End Credits" (Ron Grainer arr. Segun Akinola)	Various episodes	0:52
Total length:			75:03
