= Graham O'Brien =

Fictional character from Doctor Who

- Doctor Who character
- Bradley Walsh as Graham O'Brien
- First appearance: "The Woman Who Fell to Earth" (2018)
- Last appearance: "The Power of the Doctor" (2022)
- Created by: Chris Chibnall
- Portrayed by: Bradley Walsh
- Duration: 2018–2022

In-universe information
- Species: Human
- Occupation: Bus driver
- Affiliation: Thirteenth Doctor
- Spouse: Grace O'Brien (2015–2018; deceased)
- Relatives: Aaron Sinclair (stepson); Ryan Sinclair (step-grandson)
- Origin: Essex, England
- Home: Earth

Graham O'Brien is a fictional character created by Chris Chibnall and portrayed by Bradley Walsh in the long-running British sci-fi television series Doctor Who. A retired bus driver from Essex who is in remission from cancer, the character is portrayed as an everyman. In the show's eleventh series, starting with the first episode, he served as a companion of the thirteenth incarnation of the alien time traveller known as the Doctor (portrayed by Jodie Whittaker) until the 2021 New Year's Special "Revolution of the Daleks". He reprised his role in the BBC's Centenary special "The Power of the Doctor" in 2022.

== Character biography ==
=== Early life ===
Graham was born in Essex, during either the late 1950s or early 1960s, saying he was "only a toddler" in 1962. As a child, Graham attended Sunday School in Chingford, and sometimes spent summer holidays at Margate and Whistable. After his mother died, Graham's father "got rid of all her things super quick", unable to keep hold of them, telling Graham that "she's gone now and that's the end of it".

Graham worked as a bus driver, once having a supervisor who he would recall as behaving similarly to Thomas Edison. After he retired, Graham still kept in contact with his friends who also worked as bus drivers.

=== Marriage with Grace ===
Graham developed cancer and met his wife Grace, a chemo nurse, while undergoing treatment. When he told Grace that he was a bus driver, she remarked that he ought not to be like James Blake, who she called "Blake the Snake." He learned of her appreciation of Rosa Parks and that she owned a t-shirt that said "The Spirit of Rosa". Once the cancer was found to be in remission, Graham married her and had become her second husband by 2015.

=== Meeting the Doctor ===
Whilst returning home after an unsuccessful session of teaching Ryan how to ride a bike, despite his insistence that he was "doing it, mate", Grace and Graham were trapped when a swarm of gathering coils attacked their train in search of Karl Wright, a fellow passenger. He, along with Grace, Ryan and Yasmin Khan, helped the Doctor battle both the coil and its controller, Tzim-Sha.

Whilst the Doctor recovered at his and Grace's home, he went around Sheffield to ask if anyone had seen anything unusual. Later, Grace and Graham followed the Doctor's orders to pose as construction managers and evacuate the construction site Karl worked at, so the Doctor, Ryan and Yasmin could rescue him.

However, the gathering coils were still active, with Tim Shaw using them to damage the crane that Ryan and the others were on. Despite Graham's protests, Grace climbed up and destroyed the creature by electrocuting it with live cables. However, Grace was also electrocuted in the process and fell to the ground. Mortally wounded, she died in Graham's arms, after telling him to not be afraid without her. After she died, Graham organised her things into boxes, finding the childhood possessions of her son, Aaron, as he did.

At Grace's funeral, Graham spoke of how Grace inspired him during their three-year marriage and felt guilty that he hadn't died instead. Sometime after the funeral, Graham helped the Doctor construct a teleporter to take her to her TARDIS. Though he meant to stay behind, he, along with Yasmin and Ryan, were accidentally brought along with her.

Believing the pair to be bonuses in the Rally of the Twelve Galaxies, Angstrom scooped Ryan and Graham out of deep space and transported them aboard her ship.

On Desolation, he found Yasmin and the Doctor, who had been similarly saved by Epzo, Angstrom's rival in what would become the final stage of the rally. The rivals, with the Doctor and her friends in tow, were tasked by Ilin, master of the rally, to race across the planet; the first to reach the finish line at the Ghost Monument would win 3.2 million krin and salvation from the planet's hostile surface. The Doctor discovered that the Ghost Monument was, in fact, her TARDIS, phasing in and out of reality. After the Doctor stabilised the TARDIS, Graham entered it for the first time and the Doctor attempted to take him, Ryan and Yaz home.

=== Trying to return home ===
The TARDIS deposited the Doctor and her companions in 1955 Montgomery, Alabama, instead of returning them to Sheffield due to large traces of Artron energy. Graham was initially excited about his first journey back in history and expressed a desire to see Elvis Presley playing.

As the only other white member of the group aside from the Doctor, Graham was treated far better than Ryan or Yaz. He defended them from the racism inflicted on them, even coming to Ryan's aid when Mr Steele slapped him for returning a glove to his wife Lizzie.

Graham worked to help ensure Rosa Parks began the Montgomery Bus Boycott, using his knowledge of bus drivers to help. He and Ryan encouraged James Blake to leave his fishing spot on his day off after spreading a rumour of a black boycott.

Due to Krasko's interference, a distressed Graham was forced to take part in Parks's famous moment of defiance by ensuring the bus was crowded enough for Parks to be asked to give up her seat. Graham ultimately became the passenger that Rosa Parks refused to give her seat up to, sparking the boycott. The Doctor later showed her companions a history of Rosa's life and how she would go on to have a lasting impact on the history of the universe by taking them to Asteroid 284996, Rosaparks.

Upon returning home, Graham declined to have tea at Yaz's with Ryan and the Doctor. Instead he returned home, where he imagined Grace was still alive telling him to fix things around the house like she asked. Grieving, he began smelling her clothes despite his vision of Grace telling him it didn't help. Hearing a noise upstairs, he went to investigate, finding an abnormally large spider. Fleeing back to Yaz's, he informed Ryan and the Doctor of what he saw. He joined them to investigate further, giving Ryan a letter from his father he found at home; though Ryan took it, he dismissed reading it right away. After the giant spiders had been dealt with, Graham decided to join the Doctor in the TARDIS as he didn't want to just stay in his house and dwell on his grief.

=== Departing the Doctor ===
In "Revolution of the Daleks," after spending ten months on Earth with no sign of the Doctor, Graham, Ryan and Yaz investigated Daleks created by their old enemy Jack Robertson. Having been rescued from prison by Captain Jack Harkness, the Doctor returned to aid her companions in defending the Earth once more. Graham worked with Ryan and Jack to destroy the Dalek ship summoned by the Doctor to deal with the Daleks on Earth. In the aftermath, Ryan chose to resume a normal life on Earth and Graham chose to join him to remain with his grandson. The Doctor provided the two men with their own psychic paper as a parting gift and Ryan and Graham decided to continue investigating alien events and protecting the Earth together. Before going to investigate possible alien sightings, Graham tried to help Ryan ride a bicycle again as he and Grace had done before they met the Doctor. The two men saw a vision of Grace smiling at them as they bonded.

=== One Last Adventure ===
In "The Power of the Doctor," it's revealed that Graham has continued investigating alien activity on Earth, although Ryan is currently in Patagonia and unable to help him. While investigating Dalek activity in a Bolivian volcano, Graham meets the Seventh Doctor's companion Ace and the two work together to destroy the base and the Daleks. Rescued from the explosion by the Doctor, Graham and Ace join the Doctor, Yaz, Tegan Jovanka, Kate Stewart, and Inston-Vee Vinder in foiling the Master's plot with the Doctor's companions piloting her TARDIS alongside the Master's TARDIS to pull a cyber-conversion planet from 1916 to 2022. After the dying Master mortally wounds the Doctor, Yaz returns the others home, albeit to Croydon.

After the Doctor departs from Yaz to regenerate alone, Graham invites her and Dan Lewis to join a support group of former companions of the Doctor that he has created made up of Graham, Yaz, Dan, Kate, Ace, Tegan, Jo Grant, Mel Bush and Ian Chesterton.

== Appearances ==
=== Television ===
Graham O'Brien is introduced in the eleventh series premiere, "The Woman Who Fell to Earth" (2018). Graham is a retired bus driver and is married to Grace. While travelling on a train in Sheffield, Graham and Grace are attacked by a strange creature, but are saved when the Doctor intervenes. Along with Grace's grandson Ryan Sinclair and PC Yasmin Khan, Graham helps the Doctor stop Tzim-Sha, an alien warrior on a rampage across Sheffield, but their victory costs Grace's life. After burying Grace, Graham joins Ryan and Yaz in helping to teleport the Doctor back to her missing spaceship, but they are inadvertently swept along with her. After their consequential adventure in "The Ghost Monument", the Doctor agrees to take Graham, Ryan and Yaz back to Earth. They eventually return to Sheffield in "Arachnids in the UK", and Graham wrestles with his grief as he begins seeing apparitions of Grace in their home. Eventually, he decides to travel with the Doctor properly as he works through his grief.

As they travel together, Ryan – who has always rejected Graham as a grandfather figure – warms to him and their relationship improves. In "It Takes You Away", Graham is confronted by the apparent return of Grace while trapped in a mirror dimension. Despite the Doctor's pleas for Graham to recognise that Grace has been created by an alien force to tempt him away from the real world, he struggles to reject her; however, he comes to recognise her as an imposter when she is seemingly indifferent to the fact that Ryan was in peril. After they escape, Ryan calls Graham "Grandad" for the first time. In the series finale, "The Battle of Ranskoor Av Kolos", Graham is confronted by Tzim-Sha's return and vows to avenge Grace's death, despite the Doctor's threat that she won't travel with a killer. Graham does come face with Tzim-Sha, but with Ryan's help he instead apprehends him and locks him in a stasis chamber. Graham continued to travel at the Doctor's side throughout series 12, until New Year's Day special "Revolution of the Daleks" (2021), which ends with Graham and Ryan choosing to stay behind on Earth. He next appears in the Thirteenth Doctor's swan song episode, "The Power of the Doctor" (2023), in which he welcomes Yaz to a support group for former companions of the Doctor.

=== Other media ===
In September 2018, three Series 11 tie-in novels were announced, all of which feature Graham O’Brien – The Good Doctor, Molten Heart and Combat Magicks. Graham is depicted on the cover of The Good Doctor.

== Casting and development ==
On 22 October 2017, it was announced that Walsh had been cast as a companion in the eleventh series of Doctor Who, and would appear alongside Jodie Whittaker in 2018. Walsh had been a favourite for the role since rumours of his casting began in August 2017. Walsh had previously appeared in spin off series The Sarah Jane Adventures two-part story The Day of the Clown as Elijah Spellman/Odd Bob the Clown.

On 9 December 2018, it was confirmed that Walsh would return as Graham for series 12, with the series already in production and due to air in early 2020. Walsh departed the role in the special "Revolution of the Daleks".

== Critical reception ==
In the Radio Times, critic Paul Jones wrote that "of the rest of the Tardis team, Bradley Walsh as Graham is the stand-out, a really believable and likeable character and able to convey such a range of emotion in just a few looks". Kimberley Bond added that Walsh's performance "remind[ed] us that he actually is a proper actor and not just the host of The Chase." Huw Fullerton said that Graham has been the "surprise emotional powerhouse" of the new series.
