= Ryan Sinclair =

Fictional character from Doctor Who

- Doctor Who character
- Tosin Cole as Ryan Sinclair
- First appearance: "The Woman Who Fell to Earth" (2018)
- Last appearance: "Revolution of the Daleks" (2021)
- Created by: Chris Chibnall
- Portrayed by: Tosin Cole
- Duration: 2018–2021

In-universe information
- Species: Human
- Occupation: Warehouse worker
- Affiliation: Thirteenth Doctor
- Family: Aaron Sinclair (father)
- Relatives: Grace O'Brien (grandmother); Graham O'Brien (step-grandfather)
- Origin: Sheffield, Yorkshire, England
- Home: Earth

Ryan Sinclair is a fictional character created by Chris Chibnall and portrayed by Tosin Cole in the long-running British science fiction television series Doctor Who. Introduced in the first episode of Series 11, Ryan was a companion of Jodie Whittaker's Thirteenth Doctor until the 2021 New Year's Special "Revolution of the Daleks".

== Appearances ==
=== Television ===
Ryan Sinclair is introduced in the eleventh series premiere, "The Woman Who Fell to Earth".

Ryan is a 19-year-old living in Sheffield, England who is training to be an electrical engineer while working part-time as a warehouse worker. He was raised by his paternal grandmother, Grace O'Brien, who recently married his step-grandfather, Graham O'Brien. Grace worked as a nurse, and met Graham while he was undergoing chemotherapy for cancer, about three years before they met the Doctor. Ryan and Yasmin Khan were in primary school together, though at the time they didn't know each other very closely.

Ryan has dyspraxia, a coordination difference that impacts his motor skills. Though his symptoms are relatively mild and high-functioning, it affects his sense of balance to the point that he finds tasks like riding a bicycle extremely difficult.

His father, Aaron, a marine electrical engineer, made an appearance in the 2019 New Year Special. Aaron has been absent most of Ryan's life since the death of his mother, and was also absent for Grace's funeral.

=== Other media ===
In September 2018, three Series 11 tie-in novels were announced, all of which feature Ryan Sinclair – The Good Doctor, Molten Heart and Combat Magicks. Ryan is depicted on the cover of Molten Heart.

== Casting and development ==
On 22 October 2017, it was announced that Cole had been cast as a companion in the eleventh series of Doctor Who, and would appear alongside Jodie Whittaker in 2018.

On 26 September 2018, following the premiere of The Woman Who Fell to Earth, the fact that Ryan would have dyspraxia was officially revealed by the media. Showrunner Chris Chibnall explained: “It's a relatively common thing among kids, so I think it's important to see that heroes come in all shapes and sizes.” Considerable research was undertaken with the Dyspraxia Foundation to ensure an accurate portrayal of the condition.

Cole departed the role in the special "Revolution of the Daleks".
