= Segun Akinola =

British composer (born 1992)

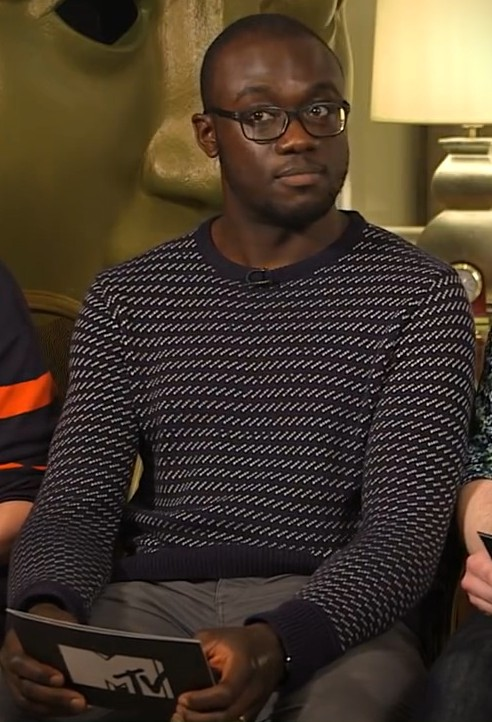
- Akinola in 2017
- Born: Olusegun Adeyemi Akinola
- Education: Royal Birmingham Conservatoire; National Film and Television School
- Occupation: Composer
- Years active: 2012–present
- Notable credit: Doctor Who
- Website: www.segunakinola.com

Olusegun Adeyemi Akinola, known professionally as Segun Akinola (/ˈseɪɡən/ SAY-gən), is an English composer for television and documentaries. He served as the music director and composer for Doctor Who from "The Woman Who Fell to Earth" (2018) until "The Power of the Doctor" (2022).

== Early life ==
Akinola has British-Nigerian heritage. As a child he learned to play piano and drums. He is an alumnus of Bedford Modern School, and the Royal Birmingham Conservatoire, from where he graduated with first-class honours in 2014. He subsequently obtained an MA degree in Composing for Film and Television, at the National Film and Television School.

== Work ==
=== Doctor Who ===
On 26 June 2018, Doctor Who executive producer Chris Chibnall announced that the musical score for the eleventh series of the programme would be provided by Akinola. Akinola returned to compose for the twelfth and thirteenth series, as well as the 2022 specials. On 20 July 2022, Akinola announced that he had made the decision to depart alongside Chris Chibnall and Jodie Whittaker, and that "The Power of the Doctor" would be his last episode as composer for the show.

== Recognition ==
Akinola was named a BAFTA Breakthrough Brit in 2017.

His "Dear Mr Shakespeare" score was given an Honourable Mention in the 2017 BSO Jerry Goldsmith Award for Best Original Score for a Short Film.

In 2019, Akinola received a nomination at the Screen Nation Awards in the "Rising Star" category. He was nominated for his work on Black and British: A Forgotten History, Doctor Who, and Wonders of the Moon.

== Personal life ==
Akinola lives in London, England.

== Music ==
Year	Title	Notes
2012	Outsiders	Short
2013	Frozen Echoes	Short
2013	GT4 Challenge of Great Britain Donington Park	Documentary short
2013	Godsweeper	Video game
2014	Wings	Short
2014	1 Way Up: The Story of Peckham BMX	Documentary feature
2015	Shaun the Sheep the Movie Green Light to Opening Night	Documentary series
2015	Vienna Ugly	Documentary short
2016	The Trip	Short
2016	White Paint	Short
2016	Paul	Short
2016	A Moving Image	Film
2016	The Proposal	Short
2016	Dear Mr Shakespeare: Shakespeare Lives	Short
2016	Panorama -The VIP Paedophile Ring: What's the Truth?	Documentary series
2016	Black and British: A Forgotten History	Documentary series
2017	Wild Horses	Short
2017	Acta Non Verba	Documentary
2017	The Human Body: Secrets of Your Life Revealed	TV series
2017	Expedition Volcano	Documentary series
2017	Custom Love	Short
2018	Wonders of the Moon	Documentary
2018–2022	Doctor Who	TV series, Series 11, 12, 13, 2022 specials
2018	Itsy	Short
2021	Stephen	TV series
2021	9/11: Inside the President’s War Room	Documentary
2023	Girl You Know It's True	German film
2023	Murder is Easy	TV series
