= Orphan 55 =

289 – "Orphan 55"
- Doctor Who episode

Cast
- Doctor: Jodie Whittaker – Thirteenth Doctor
- Companions: Bradley Walsh – Graham O'Brien; Tosin Cole – Ryan Sinclair; Mandip Gill – Yasmin Khan
- Others: Laura Fraser – Kane; Gia Ré – Bella; James Buckley – Nevi; Julia Foster – Vilma; Amy Booth-Steel – Hyph3n; Will Austin – Vorm; Col Farrell – Benni; Lewin Lloyd – Sylas; Spencer Wilding – Lead Dreg & Creature Movement

Production
- Directed by: Lee Haven Jones
- Written by: Ed Hime
- Produced by: Alex Mercer
- Executive producers: Chris Chibnall; Matt Strevens
- Music by: Segun Akinola
- Series: Series 12
- Running time: 46 minutes
- First broadcast: 12 January 2020

Chronology
← Preceded by "Spyfall"	Followed by → "Nikola Tesla's Night of Terror "

"Orphan 55" is the third episode of the twelfth series of the British science fiction television programme Doctor Who, first broadcast on BBC One on 12 January 2020. It was written by Ed Hime, and directed by Lee Haven Jones.

In the episode, the Thirteenth Doctor (Jodie Whittaker) and her companions Graham O'Brien (Bradley Walsh), Ryan Sinclair (Tosin Cole), and Yasmin Khan (Mandip Gill) are transported to a tranquility spa after Graham wins a free holiday, but the resort turns out to be on a barren 'orphan' planet overrun with mutated beings.

The episode was watched by 5.38 million viewers, and received mixed reviews from critics.

== Plot ==
The Doctor, Graham, Ryan and Yaz are taken to Tranquillity Spa via a transport cube for an all-inclusive stay. They are welcomed by their customer host, Hyph3n. As Ryan retrieves a snack from a vending machine, he is infected by a Hopper virus, which the Doctor is able to extract from him. While recovering, he meets a fellow guest, Bella. Meanwhile, a physical breach occurs and guests are asked to assemble for a muster drill. The Doctor convinces Hyph3n to give her access to the "linen cupboard", which is actually a security room with an armoury, where they meet Kane. The Doctor becomes suspicious upon discovering that there is an ionic membrane needed to protect a holiday spa. The creatures that broke into the spa start killing guests. Making matters worse, the Hopper virus also found its way into the spa's systems, disabling the transporter and security cameras.

The remaining survivors, the spa's mechanic Nevi, his son Sylas, and an elderly woman, Vilma, meet at the "linen cupboard", but Vilma notices Benni, her partner, has gone missing. The Doctor builds a new ionic membrane from scratch to banish the creatures. Now safe, Kane identifies the creatures as the local Dregs. It is revealed that the spa is a "fakation", a place designed to look like a vacation but in a fabricated environment. The spa's system, which tracks all the guests, shows Benni outside the spa, so the survivors go out to rescue him. From the vehicle, the group sees the uninhabitable desolation of the orphan planet they are on, Orphan 55. The vehicle is caught in a Dreg trap and the Dregs surround it, keeping Benni as a hostage. The group makes a run for a nearby service tunnel, but the Dregs kill Hyph3n and Benni is shot by Kane.

In the tunnel, Bella reveals she is Kane's daughter, who the latter neglected in order to build the spa. Bella escapes with Ryan via the transporter while the others are forced to continue further along to the stairs as Dregs swarm into the tunnel. After the Doctor, Yaz, and Graham discover a rusted sign, in Russian, for a Novosibirsk metro platform, they deduce that Orphan 55 is actually Earth after it was devastated by global climate change and nuclear war in an unknown year. Vilma sacrifices herself to give the group more time to escape. Going through a Dreg nest, the Doctor learns that the Dregs are mutated humans that survived the fallout. Kane stays behind to give the group more time to escape. Bella resumes her plan to destroy the spa out of anger toward her mother. As the Dregs surround the spa to attack, the group fixes the transporter and safely evacuates, leaving Bella and Kane behind to fight off the Dregs. Back in the TARDIS, the group despairs over Earth's future. The Doctor tells them that while this timeline is only a possibility, she cannot promise that it will not come to pass; humanity can either make a positive change or accept its fate and end up like the Dregs.

== Production ==
=== Development ===
Hime, who had previously written the penultimate episode of series 11, "It Takes You Away", had pitched a version of Orphan 55 in the writers' room of the prior series. According to colleague Joy Wilkinson in a 2021 interview, the original pitch differed considerably from the broadcast episode.

=== Casting ===
James Buckley was revealed to be appearing in June 2019 as Nevi. In December 2019, Laura Fraser was announced as guest star. Further cast members were announced in Doctor Who Magazine #547 in early January 2020.

=== Filming ===
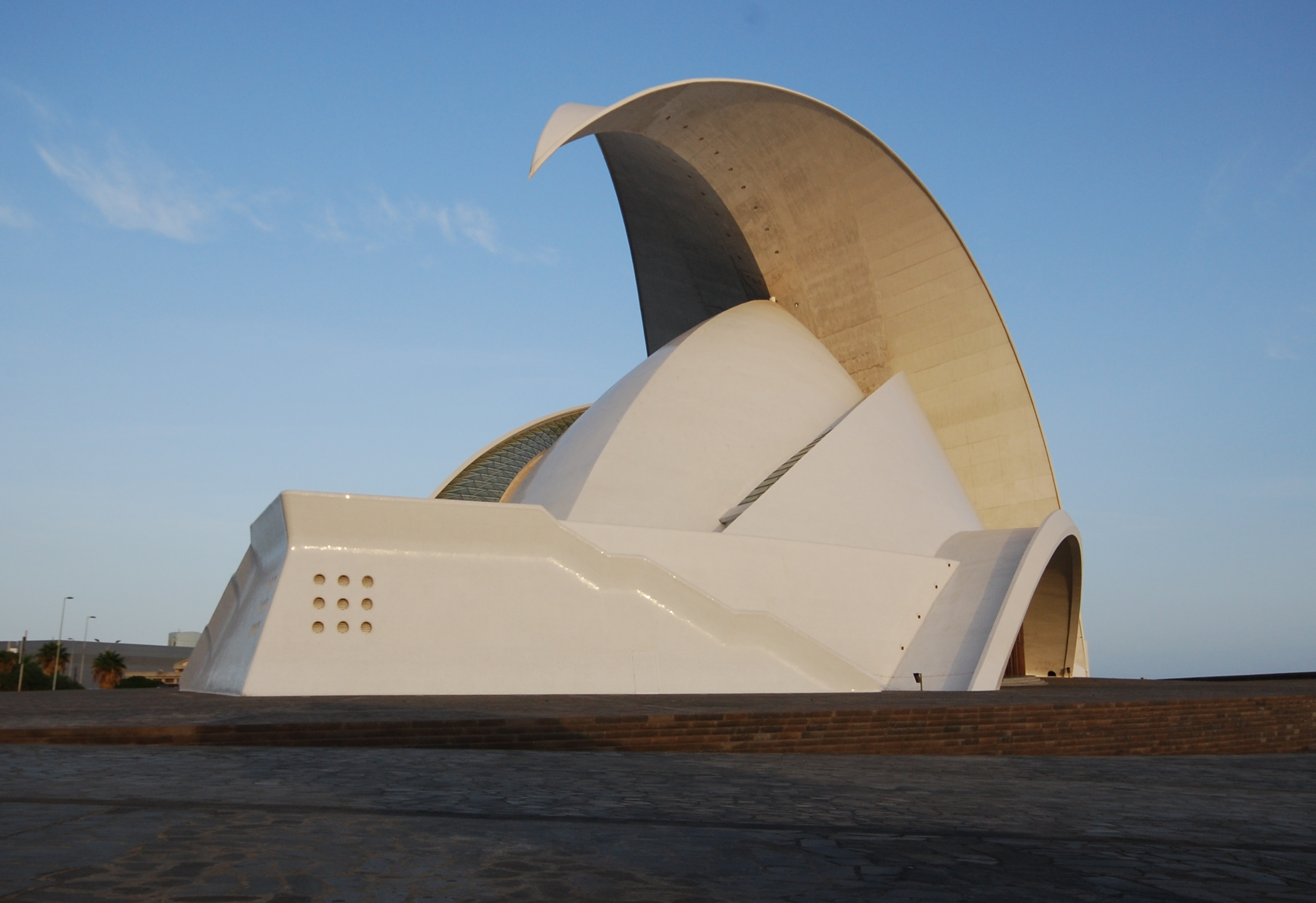
The Auditorio de Tenerife was used as the exterior shot of Tranquility Spa.

Lee Haven Jones directed the second block, which comprised the second and third episodes. Episode 3 was filmed on location in Tenerife, including the Auditorio de Tenerife for the external shots of Tranquillity Spa and the area around the dormant volcano Teide for the barren wasteland.

== Broadcast and reception ==
Professional ratings
Aggregate scores
Source	Rating
Rotten Tomatoes (Tomatometer)	47%
Rotten Tomatoes (Average Score)	5.8/10
Review scores
Source	Rating
The A.V. Club	C+
Entertainment Weekly	B−
Radio Times	3/5 stars
The Independent	4/5 stars
The Telegraph	2/5 stars

=== Television ===
"Orphan 55" first aired on 12 January 2020.

=== Ratings ===
"Orphan 55" was watched by 4.19 million viewers overnight, making it the fifth most watched programme for the day in the United Kingdom. The episode had an Audience Appreciation Index score of 77, the lowest since "Love & Monsters" (2006) which received a score of 76.

The episode received an official total of 5.38 million viewers across all UK channels.

=== Critical reception ===
The episode received mixed reviews. The episode holds an approval rating of 47% on Rotten Tomatoes and an average of 5.8/10 based on 15 reviews. The website's critical consensus reads, "Though 'Orphan 55' suffers from too muchness, its climate activist's heart is definitely in the right place."

Writing for The A.V. Club, Caroline Siede viewed "Orphan 55" as a "return to the too-often disappointing status quo of last season", criticising the episode's pacing, the excessive number of guest characters and a message on climate change that "doesn’t do enough legwork to earn it as a conclusion". Patrick Mulkern for Radio Times was more positive, comparing the episode favourably to Hime's "It Takes You Away" (2018), noting strong performances by the regular cast and asserting the benefits of "a timely eco-message banged home with a sledgehammer".

In addition, there were criticisms aimed at the costume design for the characters Hyph3n, Nevi, and Sylas, branded by one reviewer for Syfy.com as "a deeply off-brand Sister of Plenitude-style feline who more resembles Barf from Spaceballs cosplaying in a Battlestar Galactica uniform" and "wearing the least realistic sci-fi wigs I've seen since Jewel Staite in Space Cases".
