= Praxeus =

292 – "Praxeus"
- Doctor Who episode

Cast
- Doctor: Jodie Whittaker – Thirteenth Doctor
- Companions: Bradley Walsh – Graham O'Brien; Tosin Cole – Ryan Sinclair; Mandip Gill – Yasmin Khan
- Others: Warren Brown – Jake Willis; Matthew McNulty – Adam Lang; Joana Borja – Gabriela Camara; Molly Harris – Suki Cheng; Gabriela Toloi – Jamila Velez; Soo Drauet – Joyce; Tristan de Beer – Zach Olsen; Thapelo Maropefela – Aramu

Production
- Directed by: Jamie Magnus Stone
- Written by: Pete McTighe and Chris Chibnall
- Produced by: Nikki Wilson
- Executive producers: Chris Chibnall; Matt Strevens
- Music by: Segun Akinola
- Series: Series 12
- Running time: 49 minutes
- First broadcast: 2 February 2020

Chronology
← Preceded by "Fugitive of the Judoon"	Followed by → "Can You Hear Me?"

"Praxeus" is the sixth episode of the twelfth series of the British science fiction television programme Doctor Who, first broadcast on BBC One on 2 February 2020. It was written by Pete McTighe and Chris Chibnall, and directed by Jamie Magnus Stone.

The Thirteenth Doctor (Jodie Whittaker) and her companions Graham O'Brien (Bradley Walsh), Ryan Sinclair (Tosin Cole), and Yasmin Khan (Mandip Gill) search across multiple countries to investigate strange phenomena, including birds acting strangely and a British astronaut, Adam Lang.

The episode was watched by 5.22 million viewers, and received mixed reviews from critics.

== Plot ==
The Doctor and her companions, joined by ex-police officer Jake, video blogger Gabriela, and medical researchers Suki and Amaru, investigate a new bacterium infecting people in Peru, Hong Kong, and Madagascar. Those infected become covered by grey scales before their bodies explode. Birds in the local areas have also started acting aggressively towards humans.

The group finds Adam, Jake’s husband and an astronaut, is infected and held in a Hong Kong lab. While rescuing him, they are attacked by humanoids in biohazard suits. Yaz and Gabriela remain behind to investigate further while the rest go to Suki’s Madagascar lab via TARDIS to study Adam. Yaz and Gabriela see another humanoid use a panel to teleport somewhere and follow him, ending up in an alien-looking place.

The Doctor determines that the bacterium is drawn to microplastics that have saturated living beings, and that the birds’ natural enzymes are trying to fight it, causing them to become violent. As she generates an antidote, she realizes Suki’s lab is perfectly equipped for this task, and Suki reveals she is one of the remnants of an alien race ravaged by Praxeus, their name for the bacterium. When Yaz informs the Doctor of their discovery, Suki teleports away. After the birds kill and devour Amaru on the beach and burst into the lab, the Doctor and the others flee to the TARDIS and subsequently to Yaz’s location. Adam volunteers as a test subject for the antidote, and the Doctor programs the TARDIS to synthesize more, should it be successful.

When they arrive, the Doctor determines that they are at the bottom of the sea in a shell of plastic made from the Indian Ocean garbage patch. They find Suki aboard her ship and learn that her kind came to Earth, rich in plastics, to study Praxeus and create their own antidote. When Suki demands the antidote from the Doctor, she is told that it will only work on humans. Suki suddenly succumbs to Praxeus and is killed. The Doctor finds that the ship runs on organic fuel, and with Adam successfully cured, has her allies load the batch of antidote into the ship and sets it on course to explode in the atmosphere to distribute it via the jet stream. The autopilot fails, however, and Jake stays behind to pilot the ship on its course, while the others retreat to the TARDIS. The Doctor uses the TARDIS to rescue Jake in the millisecond before the ship's destruction. With the cure successfully spread, the Doctor drops Jake, Adam, and Gabriela off, and Ryan suggests that they travel the world together.

== Production ==
=== Development ===
"Praxeus" was written by Pete McTighe and Chris Chibnall, McTighe wrote an episode of the previous series, "Kerblam!". According to McTighe, the episode had been intended to bring the Autons back.

=== Casting ===
Molly Harris appeared as a character named Suki Cheng. Further cast members were announced in Doctor Who Magazine #547 in early January 2020. Warren Brown was also cast in the episode.

=== Filming ===
Jamie Magnus Stone directed the third block, consisting of the first and sixth episodes. "Praxeus" was filmed in part in South Africa, including Cape Town, along with "Spyfall" as part of first filming block.

== Broadcast and reception ==
Professional ratings
Aggregate scores
Source	Rating
Rotten Tomatoes (Tomatometer)	71%
Rotten Tomatoes (Average Score)	6.3/10
Review scores
Source	Rating
The A.V. Club	B+
Entertainment Weekly	B
Metro	2.5/5 stars
Radio Times	2/5 stars
The Independent	4/5 stars
The Telegraph	2/5 stars

=== Television ===
"Praxeus" aired on 2 February 2020.

=== Ratings ===
"Praxeus" was watched by 3.97 million viewers overnight, making it the fourth most watched programme for the day in the United Kingdom. The episode had an Audience Appreciation Index score of 78. The episode received an official total of 5.22 million viewers across all UK channels.

=== Critical reception ===
The episode received a 71% approval rating, and an average rating of 6.3/10, on Rotten Tomatoes, based on 13 reviews from critics. The consensus on the website reads, "A step back from the previous installment, 'Praxeus' is a mystery box that doesn't add up to much, but it's still a fun enough return to basics for Doctor Who."
