= Nikola Tesla's Night of Terror =

290 – "Nikola Tesla's Night of Terror"
- Doctor Who episode

Cast
- Doctor: Jodie Whittaker – Thirteenth Doctor
- Companions: Bradley Walsh – Graham O'Brien; Tosin Cole – Ryan Sinclair; Mandip Gill – Yasmin Khan
- Others: Goran Višnjić – Nikola Tesla; Robert Glenister – Thomas Edison; Anjli Mohindra – Queen Skithra; Haley McGee – Dorothy Skerritt; Paul Kasey – Harold Green; Robin Guiver – Bill Tallow; Erick Hayden – Mr Sorensson; Russell Bentley – Mr Brady; Brian Caspe – Mr Martin; Shaun Mason – Foreman

Production
- Directed by: Nida Manzoor
- Written by: Nina Metivier
- Produced by: Nikki Wilson
- Executive producers: Chris Chibnall; Matt Strevens
- Music by: Segun Akinola
- Series: Series 12
- Running time: 50 minutes
- First broadcast: 19 January 2020

Chronology
← Preceded by "Orphan 55"	Followed by → "Fugitive of the Judoon"

"Nikola Tesla's Night of Terror" is the fourth episode of the twelfth series of the British science fiction television programme Doctor Who, first broadcast on BBC One on 19 January 2020. It was written by Nina Metivier, and directed by Nida Manzoor.

In 1903, the Thirteenth Doctor (Jodie Whittaker) helps Nikola Tesla (Goran Višnjić) escape from being kidnapped by the Skithra aliens, along with the assistance of her companions Graham O'Brien (Bradley Walsh), Ryan Sinclair (Tosin Cole), and Yasmin Khan (Mandip Gill).

The episode was watched by 5.20 million viewers, and received generally positive reviews from critics.

== Plot ==
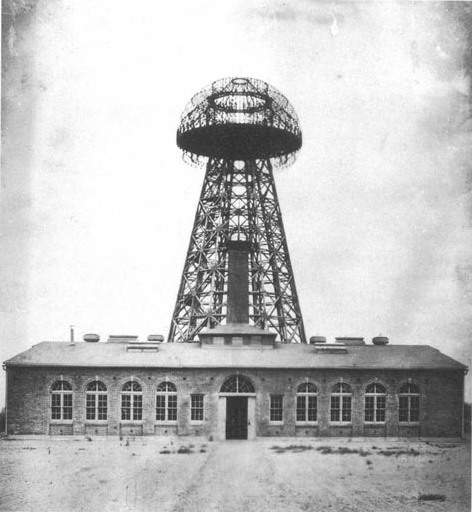
Wardenclyffe Tower in 1904

At Niagara Falls in 1903, Nikola Tesla is unsuccessful in getting investors for his wireless power transmission system as it is seen as dangerous and crazy. After working late fixing his generator, he comes across a floating orb. Feeling endangered, he makes a run with his assistant, Dorothy Skerritt, as a cloaked figure shoots at them. The Doctor arrives in time to help them escape aboard a train headed to New York City, ditching their pursuer by detaching the carriage.

In New York, the group finds protesters waiting outside Tesla's lab, having been goaded into fearing Tesla and his inventions by his competitor Thomas Edison. The Doctor identifies the orb as an Orb of Thassor designed to share knowledge, but repurposed for an unknown cause. After spotting a spy for Edison, the Doctor, Graham and Ryan visit Edison's workshop, suspecting him to be behind the attack on Tesla. The cloaked figure arrives at Edison's lab and fatally electrocutes everyone in the workshop before pursuing Edison. The group escapes and traps one of the creatures in a chemical ring of fire, but it escapes by teleportation. The Doctor tries to warn Tesla and Yaz back at his lab, but the two are captured and transported to an invisible alien ship above the city. The Queen of the Skithra demands they fix her ship. When Tesla refuses, the Queen threatens to kill Yaz, but the Doctor transports herself onto the ship just in time. She learns that the Skithra ship is just a collection of stolen parts from various species and the Skithra just use others to do their work for them. The Skithra also chose Tesla as their "engineer" because he was able to discover their signal while he had been working on his wireless power system.

The Doctor transports herself, Tesla, and Yaz back to Tesla's Wardenclyffe lab. The Doctor warns the Queen to leave, but the Queen refuses, threatening to destroy Earth if Tesla is not handed over. While Tesla and the Doctor hook up the TARDIS to help power Tesla's Wardenclyffe Tower, Graham, Ryan, Yaz, Dorothy and Edison ward off the invading scorpion-like Skithra. The Tower activates, and electrical bolts shoot through the Skithra ship, forcing it to leave Earth. Yaz is disappointed that despite Tesla's heroics, his reputation in the future remained unchanged, but the Doctor reminds her that Tesla's vision for a wireless world will still come to pass.

== Production ==
=== Development ===
"Nikola Tesla's Night of Terror" was written by Nina Metivier, who had worked as a script editor on the previous series.

=== Casting ===
Robert Glenister and Goran Višnjić were cast, as Thomas Edison and Nikola Tesla respectively. Glenister previously appeared on Doctor Who as the android Salateen in the 1984 serial The Caves of Androzani. Anjli Mohindra, who had previously portrayed Rani Chandra in the Doctor Who spin-off The Sarah Jane Adventures, played Queen Skithra. Further cast members were announced in Doctor Who Magazine #547 in early January 2020.

=== Filming ===
Nida Manzoor directed the third block, consisting of the fourth and fifth episodes. The sets for 1903 New York City were located at Nu Boyana Film Studios in Sofia, Bulgaria.

=== Promotion ===
The trailer for the episode was released after the broadcast of the previous episode, "Orphan 55".

== Broadcast and reception ==
Professional ratings
Aggregate scores
Source	Rating
Rotten Tomatoes (Tomatometer)	89%
Rotten Tomatoes (Average Score)	7/10
Review scores
Source	Rating
The A.V. Club	B+
Entertainment Weekly	B
Radio Times	4/5 stars
The Independent	3/5 stars
The Telegraph	4/5 stars

=== Television ===
"Nikola Tesla's Night of Terror" aired on 19 January 2020.

=== Ratings ===
"Nikola Tesla's Night of Terror" was watched by 4.04 million viewers overnight, making it the sixth most watched programme for the day in the United Kingdom. The episode had an Audience Appreciation Index score of 79. The episode received an official total of 5.20 million viewers across all UK channels.

=== Critical reception ===
The episode holds an approval rating of 89% on Rotten Tomatoes and an average of 7/10 based on 18 reviews. The website's critical consensus reads, "If a tad light on meaning, "Nikola Tesla's Night of Terror" is still an enjoyable historical romp that benefits greatly from Jodie Whittaker and guest star Goran Visnjic's crackling chemistry."
