= The Haunting of Villa Diodati =

294 – "The Haunting of Villa Diodati"
- Doctor Who episode

Cast
- Doctor: Jodie Whittaker – Thirteenth Doctor
- Companions: Bradley Walsh – Graham O'Brien; Tosin Cole – Ryan Sinclair; Mandip Gill – Yasmin Khan
- Others: Lili Miller – Mary Wollstonecraft Godwin; Jacob Collins-Levy – Lord Byron; Nadia Parkes – Claire Clairmont; Maxim Baldry – Dr John Polidori; Patrick O'Kane – Ashad; Lewis Rainer – Percy Bysshe Shelley; Stefan Bednarczyk – Fletcher; Sarah Perles – Elise

Production
- Directed by: Emma Sullivan
- Written by: Maxine Alderton
- Produced by: Alex Mercer
- Executive producers: Chris Chibnall; Matt Strevens
- Music by: Segun Akinola
- Series: Series 12
- Running time: 49 minutes
- First broadcast: 16 February 2020

Chronology
← Preceded by "Can You Hear Me?"	Followed by → "Ascension of the Cybermen"

"The Haunting of Villa Diodati" is the eighth episode of the twelfth series of the British science fiction television programme Doctor Who, first broadcast on BBC One on 16 February 2020. It was written by Maxine Alderton, and directed by Emma Sullivan. The episode stars Jodie Whittaker as the Thirteenth Doctor, alongside Bradley Walsh, Tosin Cole and Mandip Gill as her companions, Graham O'Brien, Ryan Sinclair and Yasmin Khan, respectively.

The episode is about the historical origins of the 1818 novel Frankenstein; or, The Modern Prometheus by Mary Shelley, portrayed by Lili Miller, and takes place at the Villa Diodati in 1816 where she was inspired to write the work. The episode also featured the return of the Cybermen in their first television appearance since the tenth series finale "The Doctor Falls" (2017). The episode was watched by 5.07 million viewers, and received positive reviews from critics.

== Plot ==
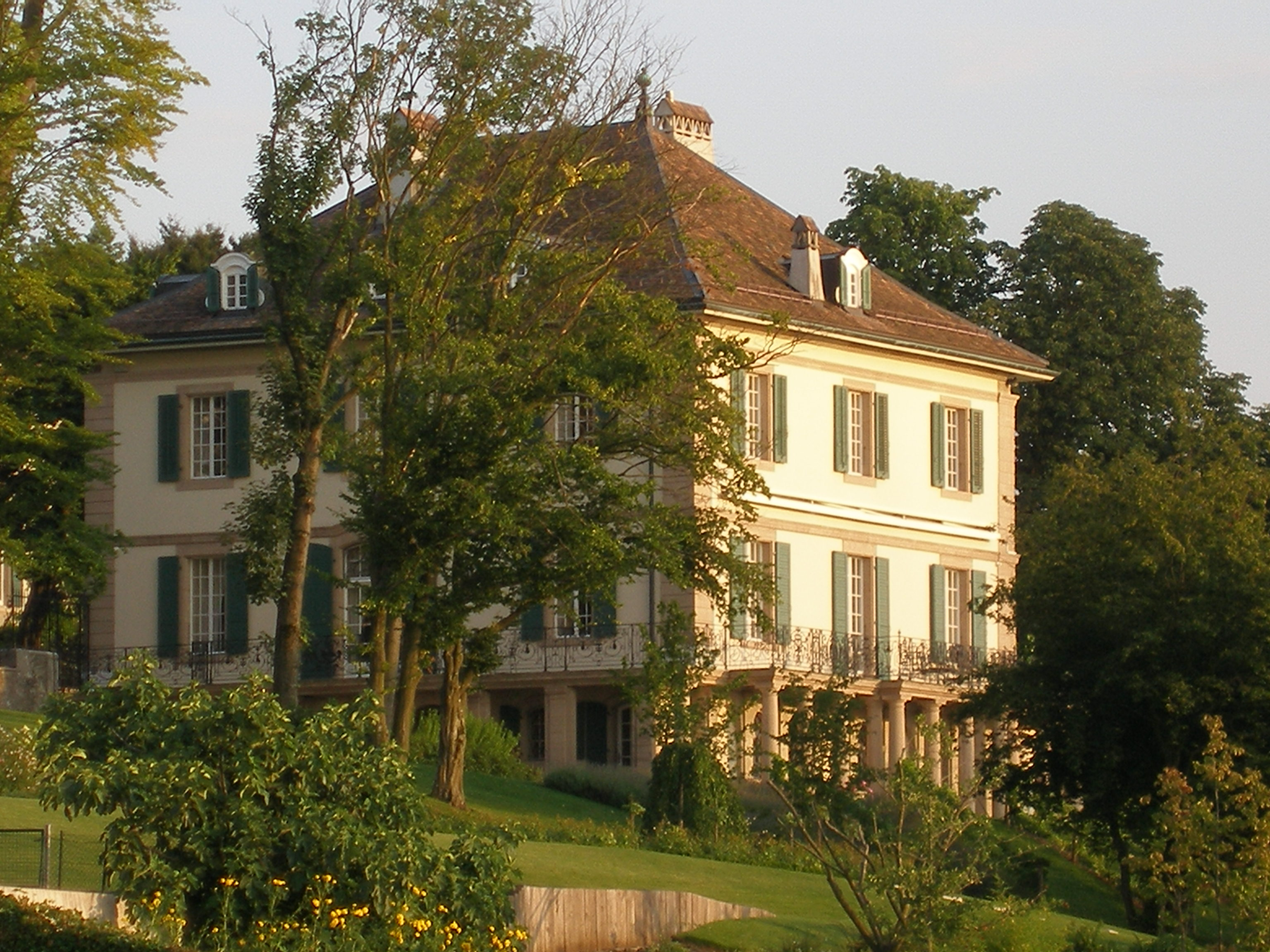
Villa Diodati

Mary Shelley, her infant William, along with her stepsister Claire Clairmont, and writers John Polidori and Lord Byron, are staying at the Villa Diodati. Because of inclement weather, Byron reads the others a ghost story, which is interrupted by the arrival of the Doctor and her companions. They had hoped to witness the creation of Frankenstein by Mary and The Vampyre by Polidori but find the party more interested in dancing. According to history, Mary's fiancé Percy Bysshe Shelley should also be there, but he is missing.

Strange events occur in the villa, such as a repeated rearrangement of its layout, objects moving of their own accord, and skeletal hands crawling around the halls. Byron suggests that a ghost haunts the place, but the Doctor suspects something else is occurring; the events are part of a security system designed to hide something. The group sees an apparition that the Doctor recognises as a being moving through time; the apparition resolves into a half-converted Cyberman.

The companions remind the Doctor of Jack Harkness's warning of the lone Cyberman (Note: As seen in episode five "Fugitive of the Judoon" of the season); she orders her companions to stay with the others and confronts the Cyberman, Ashad, who was sent back in time to look for the "Cyberium", a liquid metal with the collective knowledge of the Cybermen. He had tracked it to the villa, but his power had been sapped. As the Doctor tries to lure Ashad away from the villa, he is struck by lightning, recharging his power core. Yaz and Claire discover that the walls of Percy's room have been covered in strange gibberish in his handwriting.

The Doctor races to warn the others but instead finds Percy hiding in the cellar with a crazed look. She discovers that he is possessed by the Cyberium and it is sapping his energy; the Cyberium created the supernatural events to prevent discovery. The others arrive, and the Doctor questions whether to save Percy or stop Ashad from getting the Cyberium. Ashad arrives, and the Doctor tricks the Cyberium into leaving Percy's body and entering hers; Ashad threatens to destroy the planet, forcing the Doctor to turn the Cyberium over to him, despite Harkness's warning.

The Doctor and her companions depart, making plans to follow Ashad to the future using coordinates from Percy's Cyberman-based writings.

== Production ==
=== Development ===
"The Haunting of Villa Diodati" was written by Maxine Alderton. Chris Chibnall called Alderton "an absolute Mary Shelley and Byron… not a buff, she's an expert in that". Much of the setup of the episode is true to known fact for Lord Byron, Mary and the others, including that the summer during their stay at the villa was unusually stormy due to the 1815 eruption of Mount Tambora that led to the "Year Without a Summer".

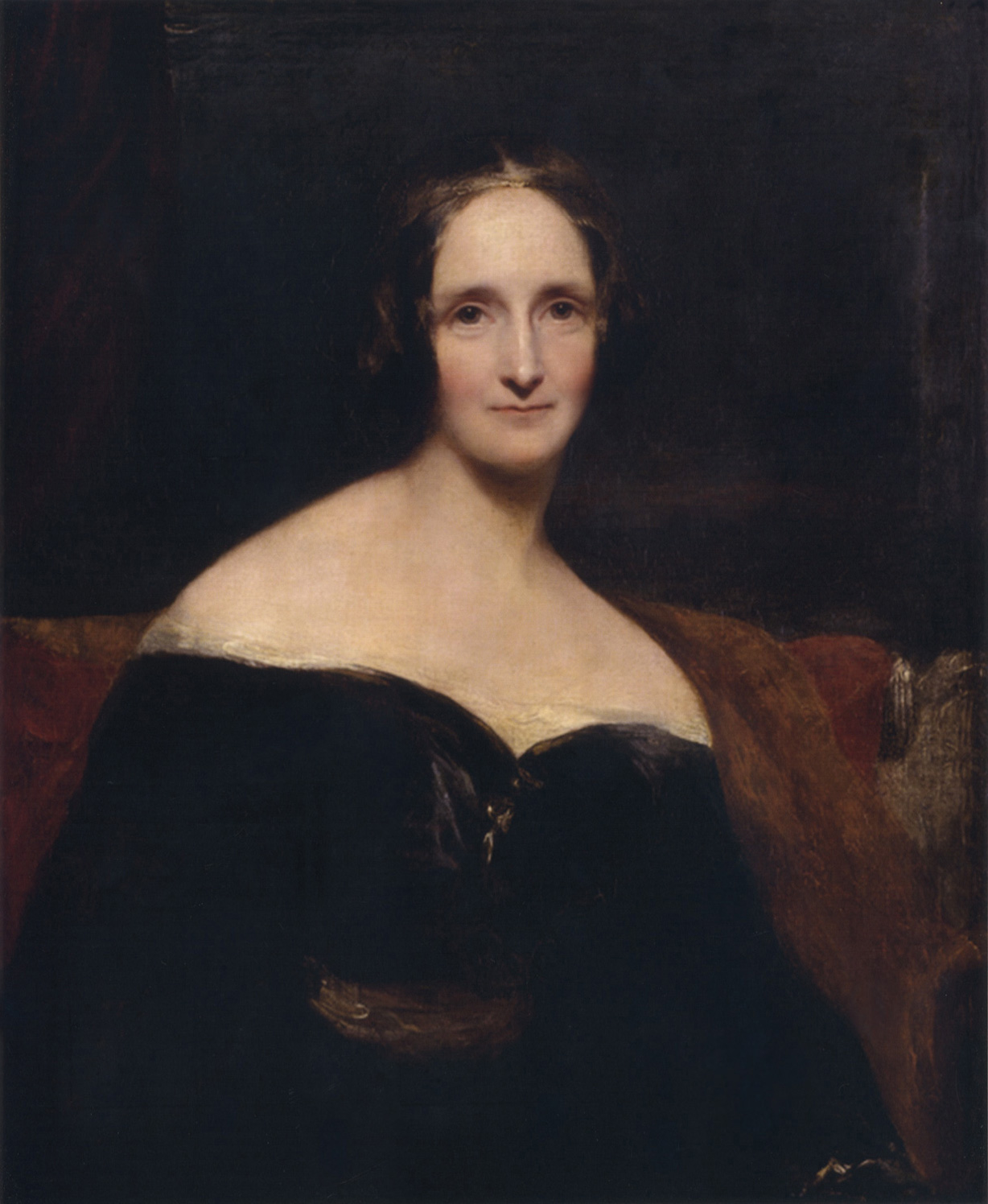
This episode is not the first Doctor Who work to feature Mary Shelley, who had been incorporated in the Big Finish audioplays.

A scene in which the Doctor warns her companions to stay away from the Cyberman, was confirmed to allude to Bill Potts, a former companion of the Twelfth Doctor who was cyberconverted during the events of "World Enough and Time".

The Doctor mentions Ada Lovelace to her father Lord Byron; the Doctor had met her as an adult in 1834 in this series' two-part premiere "Spyfall".

=== Casting ===
Maxim Baldry, Nadia Parkes and Jacob Collins-Levy appeared as Dr John Polidori, Claire Clairmont and Lord Byron respectively in the episode. The Cybermen, set to appear in the twelfth series finale, first appeared in the episode.

=== Filming ===
Emma Sullivan directed the fourth block, consisting of the seventh and eighth episodes. The Merthyr Mawr estate was the filming location for the villa's interiors.

=== Literary references ===
Early in the episode, Byron and the Doctor exchange lines of verse from Byron's short lyrical poem She Walks in Beauty written in 1814, and shortly after that he mentions his long narrative poem Childe Harold's Pilgrimage, which was published in instalments between 1812 and 1818. Later, Ashad the Cyberman recites parts of Shelley's long poem Queen Mab which was published in 1813. At the end of the episode Byron reads the conclusion from his own poem Darkness which he composed in July 1816.

Mary Shelley describes Ashad as a "Modern Prometheus", the alternate title for her novel Frankenstein.

== Broadcast and reception ==
Professional ratings
Aggregate scores
Source	Rating
Rotten Tomatoes (Tomatometer)	94%
Rotten Tomatoes (Average Score)	7.9/10
Review scores
Source	Rating
The A.V. Club	B
Metro	3.5/5 stars
Radio Times	5/5 stars
The Independent	3/5 stars
The Telegraph	4/5 stars

"The Haunting of Villa Diodati" aired on 16 February 2020 on BBC One. "The Haunting of Villa Diodati" was watched by 3.86 million viewers overnight, making it the seventh most watched programme for the day in the United Kingdom. The episode had an Audience Appreciation Index score of 80 and received a weekly total of 5.07 million viewers across all devices.

=== Critical reception ===
On Rotten Tomatoes, the episode received an approval rating of 94% based on reviews from 16 critics, with an average rating of 7.9/10. The site's consensus states: "A proper ghost story that strikes the perfect balance between horror and history, 'The Haunting of Villa Diodati' is Doctor Who at its best."

Patrick Mulkern of Radio Times rated it 5 stars, citing an "impressive" Jodie Whittaker, highlighting Emma Sullivan's direction, and calling the episode a "fine work indeed".
