= Can You Hear Me? (Doctor Who) =

293 – "Can You Hear Me?"
- Doctor Who episode

Cast
- Doctor: Jodie Whittaker – Thirteenth Doctor
- Companions: Bradley Walsh – Graham O'Brien; Tosin Cole – Ryan Sinclair; Mandip Gill – Yasmin Khan
- Others: Ian Gelder – Zellin; Buom Tihngang – Tibo; Clare-Hope Ashitey – Rakaya; Sharon D. Clarke – Grace O'Brien; Bhavnisha Parmar – Sonya Khan; Aruhan Galieva – Tahira; Sirine Saba – Maryam; Nasreen Hussain – Anita Patel; Everal A Walsh – Gabriel; Michael Keane – Fred; Amanda Liberman – Mum; Willie Jonah – Old Tibo; Anthony Taylor – Andrew

Production
- Directed by: Emma Sullivan
- Written by: Charlene James and Chris Chibnall
- Produced by: Alex Mercer
- Executive producers: Chris Chibnall; Matt Strevens
- Music by: Segun Akinola
- Series: Series 12
- Running time: 49 minutes
- First broadcast: 9 February 2020

Chronology
← Preceded by "Praxeus"	Followed by → "The Haunting of Villa Diodati"

"Can You Hear Me?" is the seventh episode of the twelfth series of the British science fiction television programme Doctor Who, first broadcast on BBC One on 9 February 2020. It was written by Charlene James and Chris Chibnall, and directed by Emma Sullivan.

From 14th-century Syria to modern-day Sheffield, the Thirteenth Doctor (Jodie Whittaker) and her companions Graham O'Brien (Bradley Walsh), Ryan Sinclair (Tosin Cole), and Yasmin Khan (Mandip Gill) are stalked by a strange being who forces them to confront their worst fears.

The episode was watched by 4.90 million viewers, and received mixed reviews from critics.

== Plot ==
The Doctor drops her companions off in Sheffield to spend time with friends and family, while she responds to an alert from Aleppo, Syria, in 1380. There, she saves Tahira, the last patient alive in the bimaristan Arghun mental hospital, from a threatening creature.

Meanwhile, the Doctor's companions have dark visions: Graham sees a trapped woman pleading for help; Yaz has nightmares about a man in dark clothes; Ryan sees the same man detaching his fingers and placing them in his friend Tibo's ears after which they both vanish. The three contact the Doctor simultaneously.

The Doctor uses the TARDIS's telepathic controls to track down Graham's vision, locating it near a spacecraft lodged between two planets, preventing the planets from colliding. Inside the craft is a small prison structure with a power source protected by a quantum fluctuation lock. They also find signals being sent from Earth to the prison via the detached fingers. The Doctor manipulates the lock while the others explore the craft, but are captured by the dark-clothed man. Just as the Doctor opens the lock, the man reveals himself to the Doctor as the immortal god Zellin, and thanks her for rescuing his ally, Rakaya, another immortal god that had been trapped in the prison. The two thrive in causing chaos and had turned the civilizations on the two planets against each other before their inhabitants learned how to trap Rakaya. To keep her sane, Zellin sent her nightmares from humans on Earth.

Zellin and Rakaya trap the Doctor and travel to Earth to feed off nightmares. The Doctor frees herself and her allies and discovers how to manipulate Zellin's fingers to engage the prison. Knowing that the creature in Aleppo is a nightmare from Tahira's own mind and cannot harm her, the Doctor lures the gods to Aleppo and then traps the gods and the creature in the prison.

After returning Tahira to her time, the others return to contemporary Sheffield to recover. Ryan promises to stay in better contact with Tibo. Yaz goes to thank a police officer who had talked her down from suicidal thoughts years prior. Graham opens up to the Doctor about his past cancer scares. Ryan talks to Yaz about the impact of their travels with the Doctor on their personal lives. As her companions discuss their future with the Doctor, she suddenly announces they are going to visit Mary Shelley.

=== Continuity ===
In a speech to the Doctor, Zellin mentions other immortal beings including the Celestial Toymaker (from the First Doctor serial of the same name), the Guardians (from multiple serials in the Fourth and Fifth Doctor series), and the Eternals (from the Fifth Doctor serial Enlightenment).

In Graham's dream, he remembers his late wife Grace, last seen in "It Takes You Away" who tells him his cancer has returned. Graham tells the Doctor in "The Woman Who Fell To Earth" about being in remission from cancer, and how Grace was his nurse.

== Production ==
=== Development ===
"Can You Hear Me?" was written by Charlene James and Chris Chibnall.

=== Casting ===
Ian Gelder portrays Zellin in this episode, having previously appeared in the Whoniverse as Dekker in Torchwood: Children of Earth (2009) and voiced the Remnants in "The Ghost Monument" (2018). Sharon D. Clarke reprises her role as Graham's late wife, Grace.

=== Filming ===
Emma Sullivan directed the fourth block of the seventh and eighth episodes.

== Broadcast and reception ==
Professional ratings
Aggregate scores
Source	Rating
Rotten Tomatoes (Tomatometer)	67%
Rotten Tomatoes (Average Score)	6.64/10
Review scores
Source	Rating
The A.V. Club	B−
Entertainment Weekly	C+
Metro	4/5 stars
Radio Times	3/5 stars
The Independent	2/5 stars
The Telegraph	4/5 stars

=== Television ===
"Can You Hear Me?" aired on 9 February 2020.

=== Ratings ===
"Can You Hear Me?" was watched by 3.81 million viewers overnight, making it the seventh most watched programme for the day in the United Kingdom. The episode had an Audience Appreciation Index score of 78. The episode received an official total of 4.90 million viewers across all UK channels and was the 36th most watched programme of the week.

=== Critical reception ===
The episode received a 67% approval, and an average rating of 6.64/10, on the review aggregate site Rotten Tomatoes, based on 15 reviews from critics. The consensus on the website reads, "'Can You Hear Me?' has plenty of ideas and some decent spooks, but good intentions can't carry an episode to a satisfying conclusion."

The scene where Graham expresses his concern to the Doctor that his cancer could return but she is too "socially awkward" to appropriately respond was criticised by fans for being insensitive or jarring to the episode's message. In response to complaint emails sent to the BBC, viewers were told the scene "was never meant to be dismissive. The Doctor's friend was scared, and we see her struggling to deal with the severity of the situation", and that "The intention of the scene was to acknowledge how hard it can be to deal with conversations on this subject matter. When faced with these situations, people don’t always have the right words to say at the right time, and this can often lead to feelings of guilt. By showing the Doctor struggling to find the right words, the intention was to sympathise with all those who may have found themselves in a similar position."
