= Fugitive of the Judoon =

Episode of Doctor Who

291 – "Fugitive of the Judoon"
- Doctor Who episode

Cast
- Doctor: Jodie Whittaker – Thirteenth Doctor
- Companions: Bradley Walsh – Graham O'Brien; Tosin Cole – Ryan Sinclair; Mandip Gill – Yasmin Khan
- Others: Jo Martin – Ruth Clayton / The Fugitive Doctor; John Barrowman – Captain Jack Harkness; Neil Stuke – Lee Clayton; Ritu Arya – Gat; Paul Kasey – Judoon Captain Pol-Kon-Don; Michael Begley – All Ears Allan; Judith Street – Marcia; Katie Luckins – Tourist; Nicholas Briggs – Voice of Judoon Captain; Simon Carew, Richard Highgate, Richard Price, Matthew Rohman – Judoon

Production
- Directed by: Nida Manzoor
- Written by: Vinay Patel and Chris Chibnall
- Produced by: Nikki Wilson
- Executive producers: Chris Chibnall; Matt Strevens
- Music by: Segun Akinola
- Series: Series 12
- Running time: 50 minutes
- First broadcast: 26 January 2020

Chronology
← Preceded by "Nikola Tesla's Night of Terror"	Followed by → "Praxeus"

"Fugitive of the Judoon" is the fifth episode of the twelfth series of the British science fiction television programme Doctor Who, first broadcast on BBC One on 26 January 2020. It was written by Vinay Patel and Chris Chibnall, and directed by Nida Manzoor.

The Judoon search modern-day Gloucester for a fugitive, and the Thirteenth Doctor (Jodie Whittaker) and her companions Graham O'Brien (Bradley Walsh), Ryan Sinclair (Tosin Cole), and Yasmin Khan (Mandip Gill) regulate the situation. The episode sees the surprise return of John Barrowman as Captain Jack Harkness, and introduces Jo Martin as Ruth Clayton, a character revealed to be a previously unseen incarnation of the Doctor.

The episode was watched by 5.57 million viewers overall, and received positive reviews from critics.

== Plot ==
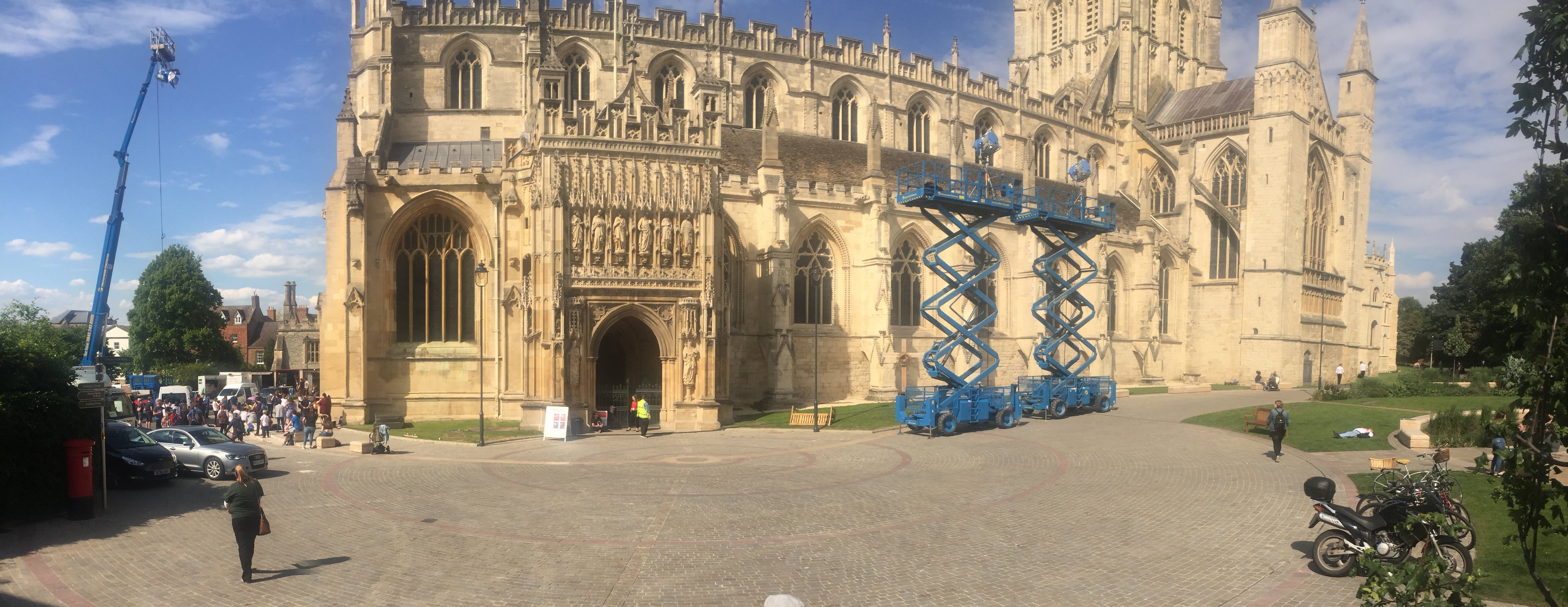
Filming took place around Gloucester, including Gloucester Cathedral.

While her companions try to get her to talk about her search for the Master (given her assumption that he escaped the Kasaavin realm), the Doctor learns that a Judoon platoon stationed near the moon has descended upon Gloucester and put a forcefield around the city in search of a fugitive. The Doctor manages to bypass the forcefield and arrives in Gloucester. Upon landing and unbeknownst to the Doctor, Graham is teleported to a stolen spaceship piloted by Captain Jack Harkness who mistakes Graham for the Doctor. The Doctor intervenes when the Judoon try to attack the apartment of Lee and Ruth Clayton, and stalls them long enough to question the couple and find a hidden box. Lee refuses to answer the Doctor's questions, but he covers the group's escape, turning himself in to the Judoon before being killed by their contractor, Gat, who recognises him as the fugitive's associate.

Whilst the Doctor flees with Ruth to Gloucester Cathedral, Ryan and Yaz are teleported to Harkness' ship, which is now being attacked by its rightful owners. When Harkness learns the Judoons' forcefield prevents him from teleporting the Doctor, he is forced to ask the Doctor's companions to tell the Doctor to beware of the "lone Cyberman" and to not give it what it wants. He is forced to teleport due to the ship's anti-theft attack system while Graham, Ryan, and Yaz are transported back to Gloucester. The Doctor and Ruth are soon surrounded by the Judoon in the cathedral. Ruth reflexively attacks them, forcing them to retreat after ripping off their commander's horn. With Ruth unable to explain herself, she reveals Lee sent her a text before his death that leads them to a lighthouse where she grew up.

There, the Doctor finds a TARDIS buried outside under a blank gravestone. Ruth, meanwhile, enters the lighthouse and, breaking an alarm box, is engulfed in energy which restores her memory. Ruth then reveals her true identity as a version of The Doctor. With neither remembering the other, the Doctor assumes Ruth to be an unknown past incarnation while Ruth believes the Doctor to be a future version of her, and reveals that she used a chameleon arch to hide herself from her former associate Gat. Ruth's TARDIS is then taken aboard the Judoon ship, and the Doctor and Ruth confront Gat, who is revealed to be a Time Lord with orders to retrieve Ruth. Against Ruth's orders, the Doctor introduces herself, and shows Gat a vision of the destroyed Gallifrey that she saw, confirming that Ruth and Gat are in her past, though she cannot remember them. Gat is killed when she fires a sabotaged weapon confiscated from Ruth.

After the Doctor is dropped back to Gloucester by Ruth, she is reunited with her companions, who relay Harkness's message. Confused by recent events, the Doctor senses that something is coming for her.

== Production ==
=== Development ===
"Fugitive of the Judoon" was written by Vinay Patel, who wrote an episode of the previous series, "Demons of the Punjab", as well as by showrunner Chris Chibnall. An early version of what became Fugitive of the Judoon had been discussed as early as March 2016, in the very first writer's room sessions of Chris Chibnall's era as showrunner. Regarding the story’s origins, Vinay Patel remarked, “I have a real affection for cathedral cities… The idea of aliens in a lovely, genteel, prestigious British cathedral town feels very Who-y”. As writer Vinay Patel was already friends with director Nida Manzoor, this influenced his writing process: "it was fun being able to write what I could to suit what I knew to be her strengths and interests."

=== Casting ===
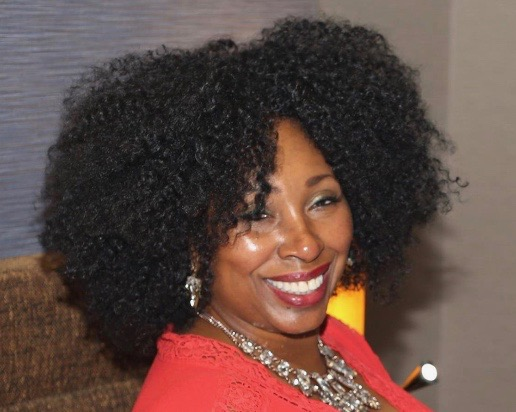
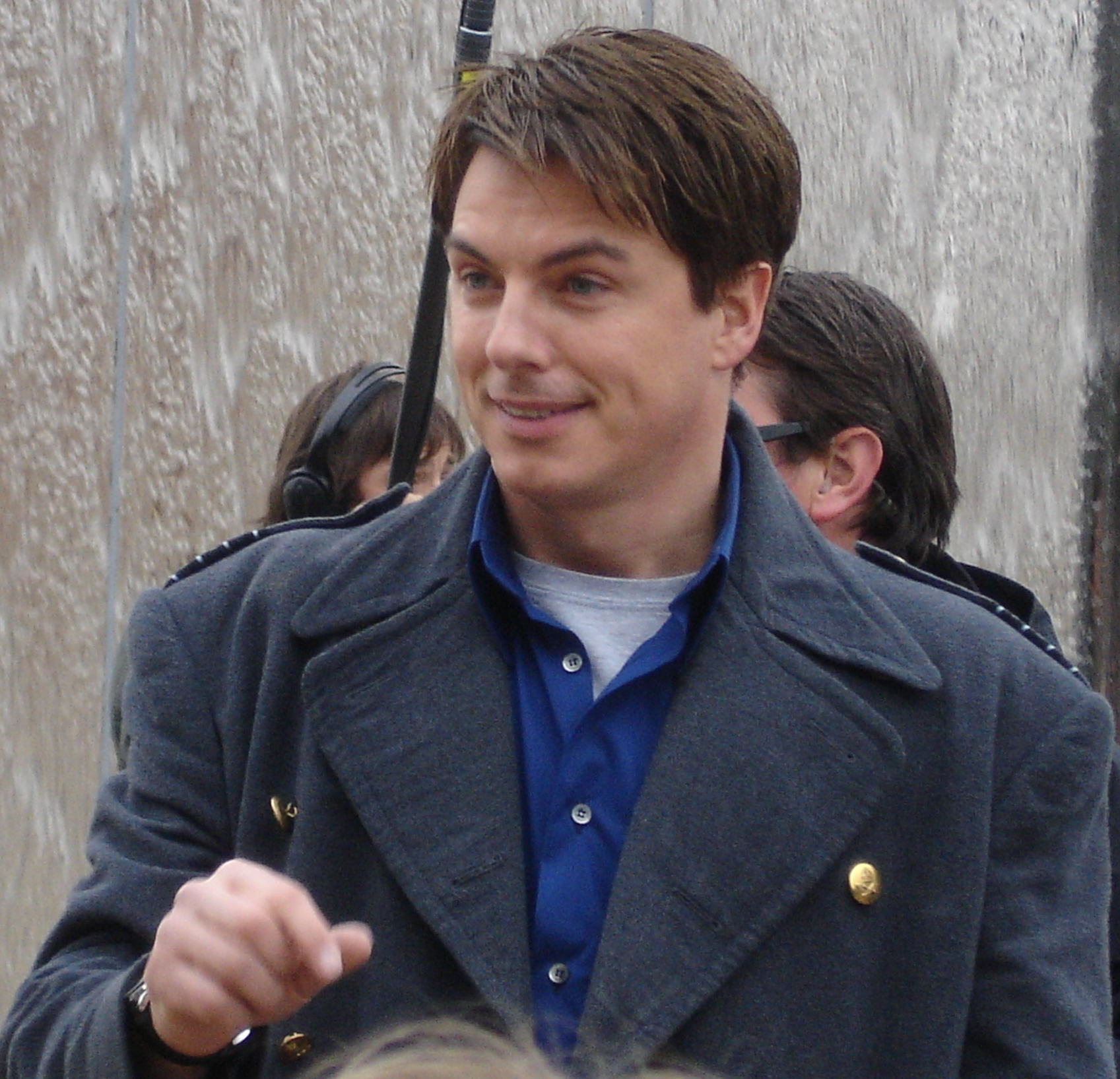
"Fugitive of the Judoon" introduces Jo Martin as a previously-unknown incarnation of the Doctor, and ends the ten-year hiatus of recurring companion John Barrowman as Captain Jack Harkness.

Jo Martin appears as a character named Ruth Clayton, later revealed to be a previously unknown incarnation of the Doctor. Martin is credited as Ruth and with an "introducing" credit as the Doctor, as previous new incarnations of the character have been since 2005. Neil Stuke was also cast, and the episode featured the Judoon. Further cast members were announced in Doctor Who Magazine #547 in early January 2020. The episode featured the return of Jack Harkness played by John Barrowman, after a ten-year absence from the series. Barrowman's appearance was not publicised prior to broadcast. Russell T Davies, executive producer and lead writer of Doctor Who between 2005 and 2010, receives on-screen credit as the creator of the Judoon and Jack Harkness.

=== Filming ===
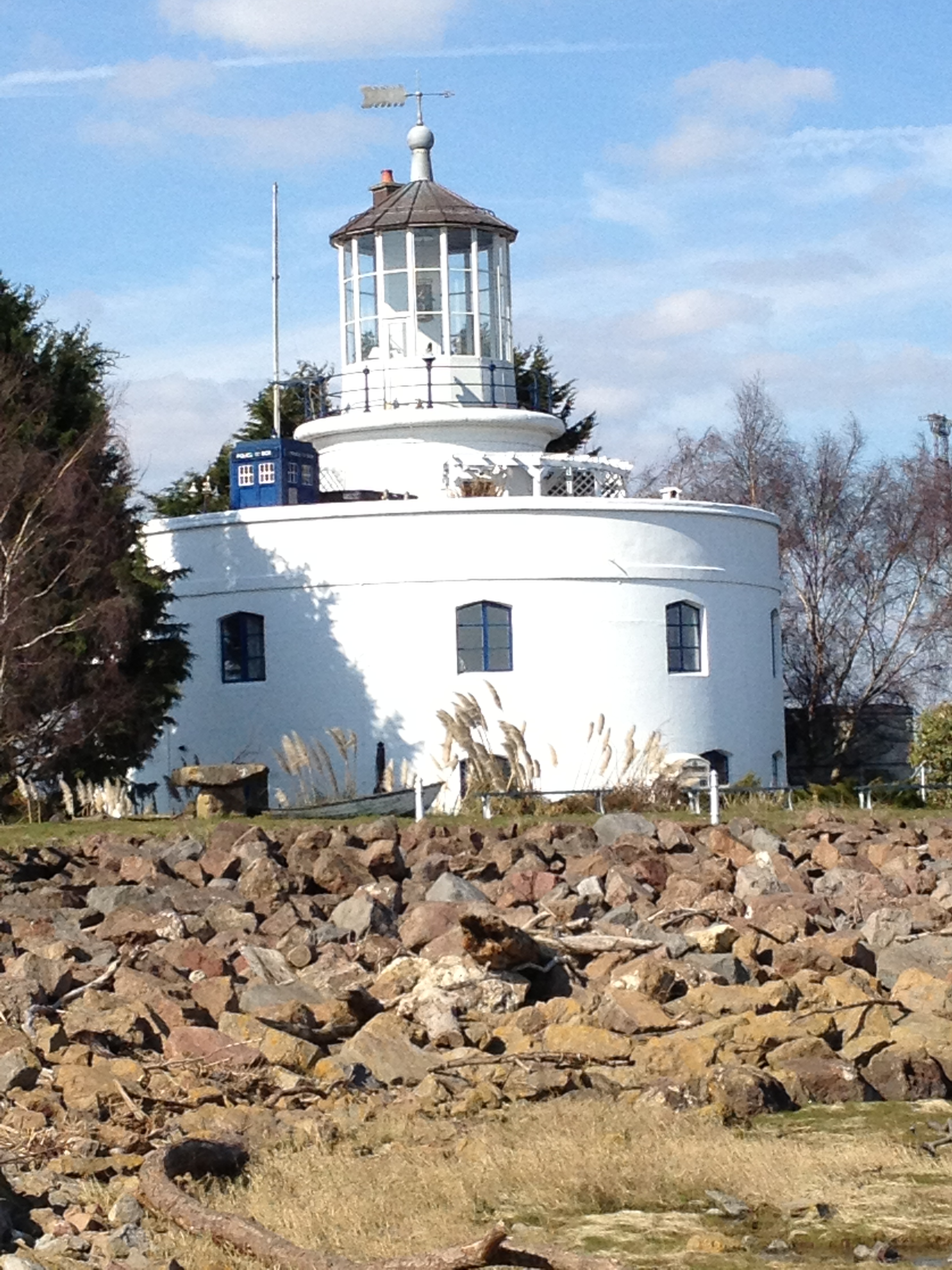
Some scenes were filmed at West Usk Lighthouse

Nida Manzoor directed the third block, consisting of the fourth and fifth episodes. Filming in Gloucester took place across 22 May and 23 May 2019; Gloucester had previously been used as a filming location for the 2008 special "The Next Doctor". Scenes in the interior of Captain Jack Harkness's spaceship were filmed at Clifton Cathedral, Bristol.

== Broadcast and reception ==
Professional ratings
Aggregate scores
Source	Rating
Rotten Tomatoes (Tomatometer)	100%
Rotten Tomatoes (Average Score)	8.25/10
Review scores
Source	Rating
The A.V. Club	B+
Entertainment Weekly	A−
Radio Times	5/5 stars
The Independent	3/5 stars
The Telegraph	5/5 stars

=== Television ===
"Fugitive of the Judoon" aired on 26 January. According to The Daily Telegraph, the BBC had withheld press previews of the episode until only a few hours before it was to air, indicating that there were significant revelations and surprises within the episode which they did not want to have spoiled.

=== Ratings ===
"Fugitive of the Judoon" was watched by 4.21 million viewers overnight, making it the sixth most watched programme for the day in the United Kingdom. The episode had an Audience Appreciation Index score of 83. The episode received an official total of 5.57 million viewers across all UK channels.

=== Critical reception ===
Review aggregator Rotten Tomatoes calculated a 100% approval and an average rating of 8.25/10 from 18 critics. The website's critical consensus reads, "Doctor Who's twelfth season takes a hard left turn for the better in the surprising and delightful 'Fugitive of the Judoon'."
