= Doctor Who series 12 =

2020 season of British sci-fi TV series

Doctor Who
- Series 12
- DVD box set cover art
- Showrunner: Chris Chibnall
- Starring: Jodie Whittaker; Bradley Walsh; Tosin Cole; Mandip Gill
- No. of stories: 8
- No. of episodes: 10 (+1 special)

Release
- Original network: BBC One
- Original release: 1 January – 1 March 2020

Series chronology
- ← Previous; Series 11 Next → Series 13

The twelfth series of the British science fiction television programme Doctor Who premiered on 1 January 2020 and aired until 1 March 2020. It is the second series to be led by Chris Chibnall as head writer and executive producer, alongside executive producer Matt Strevens, the twelfth to air after the programme's revival in 2005, and the thirty-eighth season overall. The twelfth series was broadcast on Sundays, except for the premiere episode, continuing the trend from the eleventh series. Prior to the eleventh series, regular episodes of the revived era were commonly broadcast on Saturdays. The series was followed by the 2021 New Year's Day special, "Revolution of the Daleks".

Jodie Whittaker returns for her second series as the Thirteenth Doctor, an incarnation of the Doctor, an alien Time Lord who travels through time and space in her TARDIS, which appears from the outside to be an old fashioned British police box. It also stars Bradley Walsh, Tosin Cole and Mandip Gill as the Doctor's travelling companions, playing Graham O'Brien, Ryan Sinclair and Yasmin Khan, respectively. The series follows the Thirteenth Doctor and her companions, who meet a new incarnation of the Master, the destruction of Gallifrey, the return of Jack Harkness, the appearance of an unknown incarnation of the Doctor, the Cybermen, and the secret of the "Timeless Child".

The ten episodes were directed by Jamie Magnus Stone, Lee Haven Jones, Nida Manzoor and Emma Sullivan. Alongside Chibnall, who wrote four of the scripts and co-wrote a further three, the writers include Ed Hime, Pete McTighe and Vinay Patel, who return from writing the previous series, as well as new contributors Nina Metivier, Maxine Alderton and Charlene James. Filming commenced in January 2019 and had concluded by November 2019.

== Episodes ==
The twelfth series included two-part stories for the first time since the tenth series, and more than one two-part story for the first time since the ninth series. "Spyfall" is the first two-part story not to use separate titles for its episodes since "The End of Time" (2009–10).

No. story	No. in series	Title	Directed by	Written by	Original release date	UK viewers (millions)	AI
288a	1	"Spyfall, Part 1"	Jamie Magnus Stone	Chris Chibnall	1 January 2020	6.89	82
The Doctor, Yaz, Graham, and Ryan are called into MI6 by C to investigate mysterious deaths. Their only lead is Daniel Barton, the CEO of a media company. The Doctor contacts Agent O, who was tasked with monitoring extraterrestrial activities. An alien Kasaavin kills C, but the Doctor and her companions escape. Yaz and Ryan investigate Barton, who invites them to his birthday party. Graham and the Doctor find O in the Australian outback. Both groups encounter the Kasaavin, though the Doctor is able to capture one of them, discovering their hostile intentions. While sneaking into Barton's headquarters with Ryan, Yaz is captured by a Kasaavin, and the Doctor's captured Kasaavin frees itself by replacing itself with Yaz. Joined by O, the four investigate Barton at his party. After the Doctor reveals him, Barton tries to escape, so the Doctor and her companions pursue on motorbikes to Barton's private jet. Leaping aboard the jet, O reveals he is actually The Master – having been in control of Barton and the Kasaavins the whole time. A bomb detonates, and the Master escapes while the Doctor is captured by one of the aliens, leaving her companions in the falling plane.
288b	2	"Spyfall, Part 2"	Lee Haven Jones	Chris Chibnall	5 January 2020	6.07	82
In the aliens' dimension, the Doctor meets Ada Lovelace, and they are both transported to 1834. The Doctor summons a Kasaavin, hoping it will take her back to the 21st century, but Ada abruptly joins her. In the present, Ryan discovers how to safely land the plane after finding a recording of the Doctor, but Barton brands the companions as fugitives. The Doctor and Ada accidentally land in Paris during World War II, but are rescued by Noor Inayat Khan. The Master tracks the Doctor disguised as a Nazi, though she arranges a meeting between them. The Master claims Gallifrey has been destroyed before the Doctor blows his cover and escapes with Ada and Noor to the present in the Master's TARDIS. Barton speaks at a conference, revealing that the Kasaavin will rewrite humanity's DNA. The Master arrives to see the device activate, only for it to fail. The Doctor exposes the Master's machinations to the Kasaavin, provoking them into taking him with them as they're forced back to their dimension. The Doctor visits a destroyed Gallifrey to confirm the Master's claim, and learns from a recording of him that their lives were based on lies.
289	3	"Orphan 55"	Lee Haven Jones	Ed Hime	12 January 2020	5.38	77
The Doctor, Ryan, Yaz and Graham are transported to Tranquility Spa, a vacation facility built in a dome on a desolate uninhabitable world. Seemingly peaceful at first, the facility is quickly overrun by Dregs, humanoid monsters, due to an intentional disruption of the security systems. Several guests and facility workers are killed before the Doctor re-establishes the security fields. The survivors leave the dome to save a fellow survivor, but the Dregs lead them into a trap, and they retreat to a tunnel to return to the facility. One of the guests, Bella, reveals she purposely disrupted the security field as revenge against her mother Kane, who built Tranquility Spa and ignored her childhood. The Doctor discovers the orphan planet is really Earth after years of climate change and war, and the Dregs are mutated human survivors. Kane and Bella sacrifice themselves to destroy the facility and protect the others as the Doctor safely transports them to their original planets.
290	4	"Nikola Tesla's Night of Terror"	Nida Manzoor	Nina Metivier	19 January 2020	5.20	79
In 1903, Nikola Tesla works on his wireless power transmission system. He comes across a floating orb and runs away as a cloaked figure shoots at him. The Doctor arrives and they escape aboard a train headed to New York City, where they find protesters waiting outside Tesla's lab, believing negative stories about Tesla circulated by Thomas Edison. The Doctor, Graham and Ryan visit Edison's workshop. The cloaked figure arrives at Edison's lab and pursues Edison. The Doctor tries to warn Tesla and Yaz back at his lab, but they are captured and transported to an invisible alien ship, belonging to the Queen of the Skithra, a scorpion-like alien, who demands help to fix it. The Doctor transports herself, Tesla and Yaz back to Tesla's lab. The Queen refuses to leave, threatening to destroy Earth if Tesla is not surrendered. Tesla and the Doctor hook up the TARDIS to help power Tesla's Wardenclyffe Tower, which activates, shooting electrical bolts through the ship, forcing it to leave Earth. Yaz learns that Tesla's future reputation remains unchanged by his involvement.
291	5	"Fugitive of the Judoon"	Nida Manzoor	Vinay Patel and Chris Chibnall	26 January 2020	5.57	83
The Judoon search Gloucester for a fugitive. The Doctor questions Lee and Ruth Clayton, a married couple. Graham, Ryan, and Yaz are transported to a spaceship piloted by Jack Harkness. Lee surrenders and is killed by Gat, the Judoon's employer, for being Ruth's accomplice. When Judoon surround the Doctor and Ruth, Ruth subdues them with sudden inexplicable power. A text from Lee triggers Ruth's memories, which leads them to a lighthouse. Unable to teleport the Doctor, Harkness gives the companions a message from the future and is forced to teleport away, returning them to Gloucester. Ruth finds an alarm box outside, breaks it, and is engulfed in energy; the Doctor discovers a buried TARDIS, which Ruth claims is hers, introducing herself as the Doctor. In Ruth's TARDIS, the Doctor and Ruth discover that neither of them remembers the other. Ruth once worked for Gat and hid her identity with a chameleon arch. The TARDIS is brought aboard the Judoon ship. Under orders to bring Ruth back to Gallifrey, Gat is shown a vision of a destroyed Gallifrey by the Doctor. Gat shoots at Ruth but the gun backfires. Ruth returns the Doctor to Gloucester; the mystery of the two Doctors remains unexplained.
292	6	"Praxeus"	Jamie Magnus Stone	Pete McTighe and Chris Chibnall	2 February 2020	5.22	78
The Doctor and her companions investigate a bacterium that covers human bodies in a crystalline substance before disintegrating them. Aided by ex-police officer Jake, blogger Gabriela, and medical researcher Suki, they find Jake's husband Adam in the early stages of infection, and take him to Suki's lab to evaluate him while Yaz and Gabriela explore the site where they found Jake, eventually finding a teleport to an alien location. The Doctor determines the bacterium is drawn to microplastics. Suki reveals she is from an alien race devastated by this bacterium, which they called Praxeus, and had come to Earth to evaluate it further for a cure. While the Doctor finds a cure for humans, using it on the willing Adam to test it, it cannot stop Praxeus from affecting Suki and soon disintegrates her. Travelling to Yaz's location, they find they are under the Indian Ocean garbage patch, where Suki's ship is located. They load the ship's reserves with the antidote and set the ship to self-destruct in the atmosphere to disperse it, but Jake willingly pilots the vessel when the auto-pilot fails. The Doctor materialises the TARDIS around Jake, saving him moments before the explosion. With Praxeus stopped, the Doctor suggests Jake, Adam, and Gabriela travel the world together.
293	7	"Can You Hear Me?"	Emma Sullivan	Charlene James and Chris Chibnall	9 February 2020	4.89	78
The Doctor returns her companions home, where they simultaneously begin to experience supernatural events. Graham sees visions of an imprisoned girl telling him to find her, Ryan sees a mysterious figure cause his friend to vanish, and Yaz sees an unfamiliar woman among memories of her past. The Doctor, still in the TARDIS, receives a signal from 14th century Aleppo, where she meets a young woman named Tahira, who has a mental health condition. Following their strange experiences, the companions contact the Doctor, who uses Graham's visions to track the source of the nightmares with the TARDIS. They are led to a ship in the future piloted by Zellin, who claims to be immortal and omnipotent. After putting the companions and Tahira out of action, Zellin uses the Doctor's instincts to free the imprisoned girl, Rakaya, another immortal being like himself, who has been feeding on their dreams. The Doctor tricks Zellin and Rakaya back into their imprisonment.
294	8	"The Haunting of Villa Diodati"	Emma Sullivan	Maxine Alderton	16 February 2020	5.07	80
The Doctor takes her companions to 1816 to Villa Diodati on Lake Geneva to witness Mary Shelley gain the inspiration to write Frankenstein. However, they found the villa seemingly haunted, and Mary's future husband Percy Shelley has gone missing. A spectral figure appears and reveals itself as a Cyberman named Ashad seeking the missing Cyberium, the collected knowledge of the Cybermen. The Doctor discovers Percy, finding he had found the Cyberium earlier and had gone crazy from it, with the Cyberium creating haunted imagery to prevent discovery. Despite knowing of Jack's previous warning of the lone Cyberman, the Doctor extracts the Cyberium from Percy and, under threat, gives it to Ashad, who returns to the future. The Doctor and her companions pursue, while Mary was inspired by Ashad, "this modern Prometheus," to write a story.
295a	9	"Ascension of the Cybermen"	Jamie Magnus Stone	Chris Chibnall	23 February 2020	4.99	81
The Doctor and companions arrive at the last outpost of humanity in the far future, in time to protect them from an attacking wave of Cybermen drones, though some humans are killed. The Doctor has Graham and Yaz take the others in their ship to safety while she, Ryan and Ethan, one of the survivors, travel to Ko Sharmus, known as humanity's last hope. They discover Ko Sharmus is a person acting as a ferryman for other humans to escape through a portal to the other side of the universe for safety. Aboard the humans' ship, they pass through a battlefield with debris of dead Cybermen and board a seemingly-abandoned Cyber carrier. However, too late they discover that Ashad and a group of Cyberwarriors have arrived, and have since seized the control deck and directed the ship towards the Doctor, and are waking the other Cybermen in stasis. Yaz contacts the Doctor about their impending arrival, just as Ko Sharmus opens the portal. The portal is revealed to be the new location of the ruins of Gallifrey, much to the Doctor's surprise. The Master jumps through and tells the Doctor that she should be afraid because everything is about to change forever.
295b	10	"The Timeless Children"	Jamie Magnus Stone	Chris Chibnall	1 March 2020	4.69	82
The Master forcibly teleports the Doctor to Gallifrey, where he imprisons her in the Matrix. While in the Matrix, the Master reveals that the Doctor was an orphaned female child from another dimension found and experimented on by a Shobogan woman named Tecteun. After many years, Tecteun eventually discovers how the Child can regenerate thus leading to the creation of the Time Lords. Meanwhile, the Master contacts Ashad to lead the Cybermen to Gallifrey but realises that he cannot have the Cyberium if Ashad is alive, prompting him to shrink Ashad and absorb the Cyberium. He then uses the Cyberium to convert the dead Time Lords into Cybermen, which he dubbed the "CyberMasters". Yaz and Graham safely reunite with Ryan and the others then follow the Cybermen to Gallifrey. Ruth helps the Doctor escape the Matrix by transmitting her old and new memories. Back in the chamber, the Doctor plans to detonate the death particle from Ashad's remains to stop the Master, but Ko Sharmus arrives and takes her place as his penance so the Doctor can escape, detonating the particle in his final moments. Before it detonated, the Master ordered the CyberMasters to follow him elsewhere. The companions return to Earth in a house disguised TARDIS and the Doctor makes her way back to her own TARDIS. Suddenly, the Judoon appear to arrest the Doctor and take her to a distant prison elsewhere in space.
Special
296	–	"Revolution of the Daleks"	Lee Haven Jones	Chris Chibnall	1 January 2021	6.36	79
The shell of the reconnaissance Dalek (Note: As shown in "Resolution".) is intercepted by Jack Robertson, who has funded a defence drone. Graham and Ryan meet at a disguised TARDIS, where Yaz is trying to find the Doctor. Graham shows her a video of the defence drone and they confront Robertson. Jo Patterson, projected to be elected the Prime Minister, requests Robertson to increase the drone production. Scientist Leo discovers organic cells in the Dalek remnants and clones the cells into a creature, which escapes and takes control of Leo. Leo travels to Osaka, Japan, where Dalek clones are being grown. The Doctor, who has been imprisoned for a number of decades, is set free by Jack Harkness. They rejoin her companions. Jack and Yaz investigate the facility while the Doctor, Graham, and Ryan confront Robertson. The Dalek reveals its plan to take over Earth. The Dalek clones transport themselves into the defence drones. The Doctor sends out a signal to a death squad of Daleks, who eliminate the reconnaissance Daleks. The Doctor tricks the death squad Daleks into the other TARDIS where they will be transported to the Void and destroyed. Ryan and Graham decide to stay on Earth.

== Casting ==
The series is the second to feature Jodie Whittaker as the Thirteenth Doctor. Bradley Walsh, Tosin Cole and Mandip Gill also reprise their roles as Graham O'Brien, Ryan Sinclair and Yasmin Khan, respectively.

Stephen Fry and Lenny Henry appeared in the two-part premiere episode "Spyfall". Dominique Maher and Darron Meyer portrayed Agent Browning and Seesay respectively in "Spyfall". Sacha Dhawan appeared unannounced in "Spyfall, Part 1", and was revealed at the end of the episode to be the Master. Aurora Marion portrayed Noor Inayat Khan in "Spyfall, Part 2". James Buckley appeared in "Orphan 55" as Nevi. Laura Fraser also appeared in "Orphan 55" as Kane, as did Julia Foster as Vilma. Goran Višnjić and Robert Glenister were also cast as Nikola Tesla and Thomas Edison respectively, appearing in "Nikola Tesla's Night of Terror", as well. Anjli Mohindra, who had previously portrayed Rani Chandra in the Doctor Who spin-off The Sarah Jane Adventures, played Queen Skithra in "Nikola Tesla's Night of Terror".

John Barrowman returned to his role as Jack Harkness in "Fugitive of the Judoon" and also for "Revolution of the Daleks". This is his first appearance on the show since "The End of Time - Part Two" in 2010. Jo Martin appeared as a previously unknown incarnation of the Doctor using the alias 'Ruth Clayton' in "Fugitive of the Judoon". Neil Stuke appeared in "Fugitive of the Judoon", and Nicholas Briggs provided the voice of the Judoon. Molly Harris appeared as Suki Cheng in "Praxeus". Warren Brown was also cast in that episode.

Sharon D. Clarke reprises her role as Graham's late wife, Grace, in "Can You Hear Me?". Maxim Baldry appeared as Dr. John Polidori in "The Haunting of Villa Diodati". Jacob Collins-Levy also appeared as Lord Byron in the same episode. Julie Graham, Ian McElhinney and Steve Toussaint guest star in the two-part finale, "Ascension of the Cybermen" / "The Timeless Children".

In SFX #355, it was confirmed that "Revolution of the Daleks" would be the final appearances by Walsh and Cole, Chris Noth would return as Jack Robertson from "Arachnids in the UK" (2018), and that Harriet Walter had been cast.

== Production ==
=== Development ===
In April 2015, Steven Moffat confirmed that Doctor Who would run for at least another five years, extending the show until 2020. In May 2017, it was announced that due to the terms of a deal between BBC Worldwide and SMG Pictures in China, SMG has first right of refusal on the purchase for the Chinese market of future series of the programme until and including Series 15.

Chris Chibnall returned as the series's showrunner, the role he took on following Steven Moffat's departure after the tenth series. Matt Strevens also returned to serve as executive producer alongside Chibnall.

=== Writing ===
Ed Hime (who wrote the penultimate episode of the previous series) wrote "Orphan 55". Nina Metivier, who served as script editor on the previous series, also wrote "Nikola Tesla's Night of Terror". In November 2019, Doctor Who Magazine revealed the writers for the twelfth series, including Vinay Patel, Pete McTighe, Maxine Alderton and Charlene James, as well as Hime, Métivier and Chibnall. Chibnall wrote four episodes and co-wrote a further three. In a Radio Times article, Chibnall confirmed that Series 12 would feature the return of two-part stories.

=== Design changes ===
The twelfth series introduced changes to the design of the TARDIS, with the differences including a modified column above the time rotor, an updated pathway from the TARDIS's doors, the inclusion of stairs, and modifications to the central console. These changes were introduced by production designer Dafydd Shurmer. Some episodes feature cold openings, which had been consistently used in the revived era but were entirely absent in the eleventh series.

=== Filming ===
Costume designer Ray Holman listed the twelfth series as being in pre-production in November 2018. By 17 November, BBC confirmed that Series 12 had begun production. Jamie Magnus Stone, who previously directed the fiftieth-anniversary mini-episode "The Last Day", directed the first block, which comprised the first and sixth episodes of the series. Lee Haven Jones directed the second and third episodes in the second block. Nida Manzoor directed the third block of the fourth and fifth episodes. Emma Sullivan directed the fourth block of the seventh and eighth episodes. Stone directed the fifth block of the ninth and tenth episodes.

Filming commenced on 23 January 2019 in South Africa, and concluded on 7 February, taking place at Western Cape, Hopefield, Lion's Head, and Taal Monument. Filming took place in Cardiff and Wales between February and October 2019. Filming also took place in Tenerife, Gloucester, and Merthyr Mawr. Filming concluded by 19 November 2019.

The 2021 New Year's Day special, "Revolution of the Daleks", was filmed by Lee Haven Jones. In April 2020, Chibnall confirmed that post-production was continuing on "Revolution of the Daleks" remotely throughout the COVID-19 pandemic.

Production blocks were arranged as follows:

Block	Episode(s)	Director	Writer(s)	Producer
1	Episode 1: "Spyfall, Part 1"	Jamie Magnus Stone	Chris Chibnall	Nikki Wilson
1	Episode 6: "Praxeus"	Jamie Magnus Stone	Pete McTighe and Chris Chibnall	Nikki Wilson
2	Episode 2: "Spyfall, Part 2"	Lee Haven Jones	Chris Chibnall	Alex Mercer
2	Episode 3: "Orphan 55"	Lee Haven Jones	Ed Hime	Alex Mercer
3	Episode 4: "Nikola Tesla's Night of Terror"	Nida Manzoor	Nina Metivier	Nikki Wilson
3	Episode 5: "Fugitive of the Judoon"	Nida Manzoor	Vinay Patel and Chris Chibnall	Nikki Wilson
4	Episode 7: "Can You Hear Me?"	Emma Sullivan	Charlene James and Chris Chibnall	Alex Mercer
4	Episode 8: "The Haunting of Villa Diodati"	Emma Sullivan	Maxine Alderton	Alex Mercer
5	Episode 9: "Ascension of the Cybermen"	Jamie Magnus Stone	Chris Chibnall	Nikki Wilson
5	Episode 10: "The Timeless Children"	Jamie Magnus Stone	Chris Chibnall	Nikki Wilson
X	New Year's special: "Revolution of the Daleks"	Lee Haven Jones	Chris Chibnall	Alex Mercer

=== Music ===
Segun Akinola returned to compose for the twelfth series.

== Release ==
=== Promotion ===
A poster for the twelfth series was released on 21 November 2019. The first trailer for the series was released on 23 November 2019, coinciding with the programme's fifty-sixth anniversary. Another trailer was released on 2 December 2019 alongside news of the series's premiere date. Forbidden Planet released shirts weekly with themes that corresponded to each week's broadcast episode of Series 12. Two new trailers were released mid-series on 20 January and 7 February 2020.

=== Broadcast ===
The BBC confirmed after the eleventh series's finale that the twelfth series would premiere in "very early" 2020. BBC confirmed on 2 December 2019 that the series was set to premiere on 1 January 2020, and would air through 1 March 2020. The twelfth series was broadcast on Sundays, bar the premiere episode which aired on a Wednesday, continuing on from the format of the eleventh series, after regular episodes of the revived era had previously been broadcast on Saturdays.

The "Spyfall" two-part episode was released in cinemas in the United States on 5 January 2020. The series was followed by a special episode, "Revolution of the Daleks", on New Year's Day in 2021.

=== Home media ===
The twelfth series was released on 4 May 2020 in Region 2, and included the 2019 special "Resolution" in the boxset.

- ^{(D,B)} indicates a simultaneous DVD and Blu-ray release

Series	Story no.	Episode name	Duration	Release date		
Series	Story no.	Episode name	Duration	R2	R4	R1
12	287–295	Doctor Who : The Complete Twelfth Series (includes "Resolution" in the Regions 2 & 4)	7 × 50 min. 3 × 60 min. 1 × 65 min.	4 May 2020^{(D,B)}	3 June 2020^{(D,B)}	9 June 2020^{(D,B)}
12	296	Doctor Who : "Revolution of the Daleks"	1 × 70 min.	25 January 2021^{(D,B)}	24 March 2021^{(D,B)}	2 March 2021^{(D,B)}
11, 12, 13, 2022 specials	277–300	Doctor Who: The Complete Jodie Whittaker Years (DVD includes "Twice Upon a Time")	20 × 50 min. 1 × 55 min. 7 × 60 min. 2 × 65 min. 1 × 70 min. 1 × 90 min.	—N/a	—N/a	25 April 2023^{(D)} 5 November 2024^{(B)}

== Reception ==
=== Ratings ===
The series gained the lowest ratings since the revival of the show in 2005, containing six of the show's ten least-watched episodes. The average viewing figure for this series was 5.40 million UK viewers. The series finale was the least-watched episode of the show since 2005, at 4.69 million viewers. Nielsen ratings of the show on BBC America for the key demographic, people aged 18 to 34, dropped by 52.5% compared to the previous series, down to 0.13.

No.	Title	Air date	Overnight ratings		Consolidated ratings		Total viewers (millions)	28-day viewers (millions)	AI	Ref(s)
No.	Title	Air date	Viewers (millions)	Rank	Viewers (millions)	Rank	Total viewers (millions)	28-day viewers (millions)	AI	Ref(s)
1	"Spyfall, Part 1"	1 January 2020	4.88	2	2.01	8	6.886 (Note: Episode 1, total viewers: 6.699m on TV, 101k on PC, 49k on Tablet, 37k on Smartphone)	7.396 (Note: Episode 1, 28-day viewers: 7.161m on TV, 124k on PC, 61k on Tablet, 49k on Smartphone)	82	
2	"Spyfall, Part 2"	5 January 2020	4.60	5	1.47	16	6.072 (Note: Episode 2, total viewers: 5.909m on TV, 84k on PC, 45k on Tablet, 34k on Smartphone)	6.694 (Note: Episode 2, 28-day viewers: 6.480m on TV, 108k on PC, 58k on Tablet, 47k on Smartphone)	82	
3	"Orphan 55"	12 January 2020	4.19	5	1.19	25	5.376 (Note: Episode 3, total viewers: 5.246m on TV, 64k on PC, 37k on Tablet, 29k on Smartphone)	5.889 (Note: Episode 3, 28-day viewers: 5.706m on TV, 90k on PC, 50k on Tablet, 43k on Smartphone)	77	
4	"Nikola Tesla's Night of Terror"	19 January 2020	4.04	6	1.16	28	5.201 (Note: Episode 4, total viewers: 5.071m on TV, 63k on PC, 37k on Tablet, 30k on Smartphone)	5.795 (Note: Episode 4, 28-day viewers: 5.619m on TV, 84k on PC, 49k on Tablet, 43k on Smartphone)	79	
5	"Fugitive of the Judoon"	26 January 2020	4.21	6	1.36	23	5.573 (Note: Episode 5, total viewers: 5.419m on TV, 73k on PC, 43k on Tablet, 37k on Smartphone)	6.114 (Note: Episode 5, 28-day viewers: 5.921m on TV, 91k on PC, 54k on Tablet, 49k on Smartphone)	83	
6	"Praxeus"	2 February 2020	3.97	4	1.25	28	5.223 (Note: Episode 6, total viewers: 5.092m on TV, 63k on PC, 38k on Tablet, 30k on Smartphone)	5.677 (Note: Episode 6, 28-day viewers: 5.509m on TV, 80k on PC, 47k on Tablet, 40k on Smartphone)	78	
7	"Can You Hear Me?"	9 February 2020	3.81	7	1.09	35	4.895 (Note: Episode 7, total viewers: 4.771m on TV, 58k on PC, 35k on Tablet, 29k on Smartphone)	5.412 (Note: Episode 7, 28-day viewers: 5.250m on TV, 76k on PC, 46k on Tablet, 40k on Smartphone)	78	
8	"The Haunting of Villa Diodati"	16 February 2020	3.86	7	1.21	31	5.073 (Note: Episode 8, total viewers: 4.945m on TV, 61k on PC, 36k on Tablet, 31k on Smartphone)	5.565 (Note: Episode 8, 28-day viewers: 5.398m on TV, 79k on PC, 46k on Tablet, 41k on Smartphone)	80	
9	"Ascension of the Cybermen"	23 February 2020	3.71	8	1.28	25	4.987 (Note: Episode 9, total viewers: 4.847m on TV, 68k on PC, 38k on Tablet, 33k on Smartphone)	5.551 (Note: Episode 9, 28-day viewers: 5.374m on TV, 85k on PC, 48k on Tablet, 44k on Smartphone)	81	
10	"The Timeless Children"	1 March 2020	3.78	7	0.91	30	4.694 (Note: Episode 10, total viewers: 4.550m on TV, 70k on PC, 39k on Tablet, 34k on Smartphone)	5.173 (Note: Episode 10, 28-day viewers: 4.999m on TV, 83k on PC, 47k on Tablet, 43k on Smartphone)	82	
–	"Revolution of the Daleks"	1 January 2021	4.69	3	1.67	10	6.355 (Note: Special episode, total viewers: 6.246m on TV, 45k on PC, 36k on Tablet, 28k on Smartphone)	6.599 (Note: Special episode, total viewers: 6.459m on TV, 56k on PC, 48k on Tablet, 35k on Smartphone)	79	

=== Critical reception ===
Doctor Who series 12: Critical reception by episode
Series 12 (2020): Percentage of positive critics' reviews tracked by the website Rotten Tomatoes

Doctor Who's twelfth series received positive reviews from critics. Series 12 holds a 78% critic approval rating on online review aggregation site Rotten Tomatoes with an average score of 6.55/10, based on 179 critic reviews. The site's consensus reads "Doctor Who's twelfth outing adds welcome nuances to Jodie Whittaker's Doctor and some scary new layers of horror to some of the series' most terrifying villains." Metacritic calculated a weighted average score of 80 out of 100 from 4 reviews of the series premiere, indicating "generally favorable reviews".

=== Awards and nominations ===
Year	Award	Category	Nominee(s)	Result	Ref(s)
2020	BAFTA Cymru Awards	Best Director	Lee Haven Jones for "Spyfall, Part 2"	Nominated	
2020	BAFTA Cymru Awards	Best Editing	Rebecca Trotman	Won	
2020	Critics Choice Super Awards	Best Actress in a Science Fiction/Fantasy Series	Jodie Whittaker	Nominated	
2020	Saturn Awards	Best Science Fiction Television Series	Doctor Who	Nominated	
2020	TV Choice Awards	Best Family Drama	Doctor Who	Nominated	
2021	Hugo Awards	Best Dramatic Presentation, Short Form	Vinay Patel and Chris Chibnall for "Fugitive of the Judoon"	Nominated	

== Soundtrack ==
48 selected pieces of score from this series as composed by Segun Akinola were released in a 2-CD set on 3 April 2020 by Silva Screen Records. Twelve selected pieces of score from "Revolution of the Daleks" as composed by Segun Akinola were released on digital music platforms on 2 January 2021 by Silva Screen Records, which were also released on CD 11 November 2022 as a bonus disc to the Series 13 – Flux soundtrack release.

Doctor Who: Series 12

Soundtrack album by Segun Akinola
- Released: 3 April 2020
- Recorded: 2019
- Genre: Soundtrack
- Length: 152:19
- Label: Silva Screen Records
- Producer: Segun Akinola

Doctor Who soundtrack chronology
Doctor Who: Series 11 (2019)	Doctor Who: Series 12 (2020)	Doctor Who: The Sun Makers (2020)

All tracks are written by Segun Akinola, except where noted.

Disc 1
No.	Title	Episode	Length
1.	"Series 12 Opening Titles" (Ron Grainer arr. Segun Akinola)	Various episodes	0:40
2.	"The Attacks"	"Spyfall, Part 1"	2:28
3.	"Hold On"	″	0:53
4.	"MI6"	″	5:09
5.	"Beyond Your Understanding"	″	1:28
6.	"Doctor, The Doctor"	″	1:02
7.	"Going Undercover"	″	4:04
8.	"The Spy Master"	″	5:51
9.	"Don't Panic"	"Spyfall, Part 2"	3:41
10.	"The Incredible Shrinking Device"	″	3:07
11.	"Thank You"	″	2:11
12.	"The Lie"	″	3:10
13.	"Tranquility Spa"	"Orphan 55"	3:05
14.	"Stay Alive"	″	2:48
15.	"One Possible Future"	″	6:59
16.	"Big Fat Liar"	"Nikola Tesla's Night of Terror"	2:17
17.	"The American Sense of Humour"	″	2:22
18.	"Official Eviction Notice"	″	1:38
19.	"Superior Minds"	″	3:21
20.	"The Future Is Mine"	″	5:01
21.	"Judoon Warning Transmission"	"Fugitive of the Judoon"	2:51
22.	"You Missed Me, Right?"	″	0:50
23.	"Fugitive Identified"	″	2:44
24.	"The Lighthouse"	″	5:05
25.	"Something Is Coming for Me"	″	3:54
Total length:			76:39

Disc 2
No.	Title	Episode	Length
1.	"Together and Alone"	"Praxeus"	3:29
2.	"Praxeus"	″	6:39
3.	"Three Idiots Roaming"	″	5:17
4.	"Get Everyone Out"	"Can You Hear Me?"	2:45
5.	"The Bloke Watching Your Dreams"	″	1:57
6.	"His Eternal Partner"	″	3:31
7.	"It's Not Just You"	″	5:31
8.	"Tales of The Dead"	"The Haunting of Villa Diodati"	2:04
9.	"A Traveller Moving Through Time"	″	2:15
10.	"Quicksilver"	″	2:32
11.	"She Was the Universe"	″	3:21
12.	"Brendan"	"Ascension of the Cybermen"	2:35
13.	"Be Afraid"	″	3:46
14.	"The Fall"	″	2:02
15.	"The Ascension Shall Begin"	″	4:11
16.	"Everything Is About to Change"	″	2:49
17.	"Tecteun"	"The Timeless Children"	3:10
18.	"Time Lords"	″	2:49
19.	"The Division"	″	1:11
20.	"CyberMasters"	″	5:08
21.	"My Penance"	″	6:03
22.	"Home Sweet Home"	″	1:25
23.	"Ascension of the Cybermen End Credits" (Ron Grainer arr. Segun Akinola)	"Ascension of the Cybermen"	1:10
Total length:			75:40
