= Pete McTighe =

British screenwriter and producer

Writer/Producer Pete McTighe during production of The War Between The Land And The Sea (from Doctor Who Magazine)

Peter McTighe is a British and Australian screenwriter and producer. He was the originating writer of prison drama series Wentworth, writing most of the first season and key episodes of subsequent seasons. The show ran for nine years, sold to hundreds of countries internationally and won dozens of awards including Most Outstanding and Most Popular Drama at the AACTA and Logie Awards. He is the creator and writer of the BBC1 mystery thriller series The Pact and has written and/or Executive Produced various television productions in the UK and internationally, including Doctor Who, The War Between The Land And The Sea, The Rising, A Discovery of Witches, Glitch and Nowhere Boys. McTighe has received five Australian Writers Guild Award and one Welsh BAFTA nomination for his work.

== Career ==
=== Early work ===
McTighe was born in the United Kingdom. After spending his childhood in the UK, he moved to Australia, where he studied film and television at Victorian College of the Arts in Melbourne. He initially worked in the music industry, but changed careers to work in television after authoring a pilot script for a drama series based on his experiences in music, which received attention from a production company and was made through funding from an Australian Film Institute body. Off the back of this, he was invited to join the writing team at Neighbours in 2006, eventually becoming the head of its script department. His contributions to the series included the show's 6000th episode, which aired as part of the 25th anniversary on 27 August 2010. In 2012, he was nominated for his first Australian Writers Guild Award (AWGIE) in the category of Best Television Serial for Episode 6231.

McTighe later wrote scripts for the ABC drama series Crownies, Tricky Business and the Seven Network drama Winners & Losers. In 2011, McTighe started writing for the BBC One drama EastEnders.

=== Wentworth ===
In 2012, it was announced McTighe would be writing a reimagining of Prisoner Cell Block H called Wentworth. McTighe was the head writer for the first series, writing six of the ten episodes. His pilot script for Wentworth was unveiled to the media in February 2013 to a positive reception. Ben Pobjie from The Age called the production "a no-holds-barred triumph". McTighe's pilot episode became the most watched non-sport program in subscription television history, and the series itself went on to sell extensively internationally and to be remade (using McTighe's scripts) in the Netherlands and Germany. The series has won dozens of awards including Most Outstanding Drama several years in a row. McTighe wrote the opening episode and the series finale of the second season, for which he received an AWGIE Award nomination. In August 2016 he was nominated for an Australian Writers Guild Award for the Wentworth Series 3 finale "Blood And Fire" and a year later he was nominated for a fifth time for the Wentworth Series 4 finale. McTighe wrote 27 key episodes of the Series across the first 8 seasons. He appeared in a cameo role in the final scene of Season 7 which saw the return of popular villain Joan Ferguson.

=== Doctor Who ===
In August 2018, McTighe was announced as one of the writers for the eleventh series of Doctor Who; his episode is the seventh in the series, titled "Kerblam!". The BBC press release quoted him as saying, "My entire television career has quite literally been an elaborate plan to get to write Doctor Who – and no one is more shocked than me that it paid off. I've been having the time of my life working with Chris, and writing for Jodie and the new team, and can't wait for everyone to see what we've been up to." In November 2019, McTighe was announced as one of the writers for the twelfth series, co-writing "Praxeus" with Chris Chibnall. He was additionally among several writers who were part of initial script development for the thirteenth series, which had to be abandoned following the COVID-19 pandemic and it being reduced to become the serialised six-episode Flux in the process.

McTighe wrote the sleeve notes for many of the classic Doctor Who DVD releases during the final years of the range. In 2018 he became Content Consultant for the Doctor Who classic Blu-ray range and also wrote the booklets that accompany each box set. He writes and directs regular short dramatic video productions featuring classic Doctors and companions to promote the release of The Collection sets.

In 2023 McTighe wrote the Kerblam! novelisation for the revived Target Books series, as well as the additional material created for the Tales of the TARDIS re-releases of The Mind Robber and The Curse of Fenric.

In 2024, it was announced that McTighe had co-wrote the Doctor Who spin-off series The War Between the Land and the Sea alongside Russell T Davies, also serving as an executive producer with Davies and Bad Wolf.

In January 2025, it was announced that McTighe was returning to Doctor Who as a writer on the fifteenth series. His episode, "Lucky Day" was aired 3 May 2025.

=== The Pact ===
McTighe created and wrote the BBC1 mystery thriller series The Pact which aired in May 2021, starring Laura Fraser, Julie Hesmondhalgh, Rakie Ayola, Eiry Thomas, Aneurin Barnard and Jason Hughes. The series was filmed in Wales. A second series co-written with Joy Wilkinson and starring Rakie Ayola was screened in October 2022.

=== Other work ===
McTighe wrote episodes for the second series of The Doctor Blake Mysteries In 2014 he wrote for the BBC America supernatural/mystery series Tatau, and the comedy-drama Cara Fi. In 2015, McTighe received an AWGIE Award nomination for his work on the teen supernatural series Nowhere Boys. He also wrote scripts for the 2017 Netflix/ABC drama series Glitch.

In June 2019, McTighe joined the second season of Sky/BBC America supernatural series A Discovery of Witches as a writer and executive producer. He also wrote an episode of the Netflix series Clickbait.

In 2021, Sky Max broadcast his supernatural thriller series The Rising.

In 2023, it was announced Bronte Pictures will produce McTighe's 1978, a period musical film about Sydney’s Gay and Lesbian Mardi Gras.

== Filmography ==
Year	Title	Credit			Notes
Year	Title	Writer	Director	Executive Producer	Notes
2008–2014	Neighbours	Yes			Writer: Seasons 24–30 (89 episodes) Senior storyliner: Season 24 (12 episodes) Script editor: Season 24 (4 episodes) Associate script editor: Season 24 (2 episodes) Story editor: Season 24 (2 episodes) Associate story editor: Season 24 (4 episodes) Acting storyline editor: Season 24 (2 episodes)
2011–2013	EastEnders	Yes			(10 episodes)
2011	Crownies	Yes			Season 1 (2 episodes)
2012	Tricky Business	Yes			Season 1 (1 episode)
2012–2015	Winners & Losers	Yes			Seasons 2–4 (6 episodes)
2013–2020	Wentworth	Yes			Head writer: Season 1 (1 episode) Screenplay: Season 1 (6 episodes) Writer: Seasons 2–8 (21 episodes) Also actor: Season 7 (1 episode, as 'Hobo')
2014–2016	The Doctor Blake Mysteries	Yes			Seasons 2, 4 (3 episodes)
2014	Celblok H				Dutch adaptation of Wentworth Original script: Seasons 1–2 (10 episodes)
2014	Love Me	Yes			Season 1 (2 episodes)
2014	Nowhere Boys	Yes			Season 2 (1 episode)
2015	Block B – Unter Arrest				German adaptation of Wentworth Original story: Season 1 (5 episodes)
2015	Tatau	Yes			Season 1 (1 episode)
2017–2019	Glitch	Yes			Seasons 2–3 (3 episodes)
2018–2020, 2025	Doctor Who	Yes			Series 11–12, 15 (3 episodes)
2018	Galactic Glitter Tours	Yes			Video
2019	The Sixth Doctor on Trial Again	Yes			Short
2019	The Promise	Yes	Yes		Video
2020	The Home Assistants of Death	Yes	Yes		Video
2020	Return of the Autons	Yes	Yes		Video
2021	The Discovery of Witches	Yes		Yes	Writer: Season 2 (4 episodes) Executive producer: Season 2 (10 episodes)
2021	Doctor Who – 24 Carat	Yes	Yes		Video (also Editor)
2021	A Business Proposal for Mel!	Yes	Yes		Video (also Editor)
2021–2022	The Pact	Yes		Yes	Seasons 1–2 (12 episodes)
2021	Clickbait	Yes			Miniseries (1 episode)
2022	The Eternal Mystery	Yes		Yes	Video
2022	The Rising	Yes		Yes	Season 1 (8 episodes)
2022	The Storyteller	Yes	Yes	Yes	Video
2023	Defenders of the Earth	Yes	Yes	Yes	Video
2023	The Passenger	Yes	Yes	Yes	Video
2023	Tales of the TARDIS	Yes			2 episodes
2025	The War Between the Land and the Sea	Yes		Yes	Writer: 3 episodes Executive producer: 5 episodes
TBA	1978	Yes		Yes	Feature film (pre-production)
