= Nina Metivier =

British screenwriter

- Occupations: Screenwriter, script editor, television producer
- Known for: The A List; Doctor Who

Nina Metivier is a British screenwriter, best known for co-creating the teen thriller The A List.

== Early life and education ==
Metivier was educated at Stockport Grammar School. Metivier credited Philip Pullman's His Dark Materials trilogy for inspiring her to write.

== Career ==
Metivier began her career in children's television, working as a script editor and development executive at Kindle Entertainment. She began a running collaboration with Dan Berlinka in 2014, co-creating and writing the children's mystery series Dixi for CBBC Online. It won the BAFTA award for Original Interactive Show in 2014. In 2018, she would reteam with Berlinka for The A List, which released on BBC iPlayer on 25 October 2018. The series would move to Netflix for the second season, which she also co-wrote.

She continued script editing on The Life and Adventures of Nick Nickleby and the eleventh series of Doctor Who. She would later write the fourth episode of the twelfth series, "Nikola Tesla's Night of Terror". Metivier also wrote episodes for After the Flood, Fool Me Once and Death Valley.
