= It Takes You Away =

Doctor Who episode

285 – "It Takes You Away"
- Doctor Who episode

Cast
- Doctor: Jodie Whittaker – Thirteenth Doctor
- Companions: Bradley Walsh – Graham O'Brien; Tosin Cole – Ryan Sinclair; Mandip Gill – Yasmin Khan
- Others: Sharon D Clarke – Grace O'Brien; Ellie Wallwork – Hanne; Kevin Eldon – Ribbons; Christian Rubeck – Erik; Lisa Stokke – Trine

Production
- Directed by: Jamie Childs
- Written by: Ed Hime
- Produced by: Nikki Wilson
- Executive producers: Chris Chibnall; Matt Strevens; Sam Hoyle
- Music by: Segun Akinola
- Series: Series 11
- Running time: 49 minutes
- First broadcast: 2 December 2018

Chronology
← Preceded by "The Witchfinders"	Followed by → "The Battle of Ranskoor Av Kolos"

"It Takes You Away" is the ninth and penultimate episode of the 11th series of the British science fiction television programme Doctor Who. It was written by Ed Hime and directed by Jamie Childs, and was first broadcast on BBC One on 2 December 2018.

Set in Norway in 2018, the episode involves the alien time traveller the Thirteenth Doctor (Jodie Whittaker) and her companions Graham O'Brien (Bradley Walsh), Ryan Sinclair (Tosin Cole), and Yasmin Khan (Mandip Gill) investigating the disappearance of a widower called Erik (Christian Rubeck) with the assistance of his daughter, Hanne (Ellie Wallwork).

The episode was watched by 6.42 million viewers and received generally positive reviews from critics.

== Plot ==
The Thirteenth Doctor and her companions arrive in present-day Norway, materialising near a cabin. They meet its sole occupant, a blind teen named Hanne who moved to the cabin with her father Erik following the death of her mother Trine. Her father has since disappeared, with Hanne unable to search for him because she keeps hearing a creature outside the cabin every day. Upstairs, the group discover a bedroom mirror with no reflection, revealed to be a portal. While the Doctor, Graham and Yasmin enter it, Ryan remains behind with Hanne. Upon finding speakers around the house aimed at keeping her inside, Ryan's discovery prompts Hanne to knock him out and enter the portal.

The Doctor and the others find themselves in the Antizone, a buffer-space between universes to prevent catastrophic damage. They briefly encounter Ribbons, a deceptive alien who guides them through the zone only to become prey for flesh-eating moths when attempting to take the Doctor's sonic screwdriver. The others evade them by entering another portal, finding themselves within a reflected parallel universe, whereupon they encounter Erik talking with Trine, despite her being dead. At the same time, Graham finds himself encountering his own dead wife, Grace. The Doctor deduces that they are encountering the Solitract, a sentient entity whose incompatibility with the universe led to its exile, becoming a universe seeking companionship. Hanne arrives and immediately recognizes the Solitract version of Trine as an impostor before being ejected back to the Antizone.

The Doctor realizes that the Solitract is collapsing in on itself due to the group's presence. She then manages to get everyone out while convincing the Solitract to keep her instead of Erik by offering it her vast experience. The Solitract accepts the offer and ejects Erik, bringing the Doctor to a room within a white space. Despite her enthusiasm at the prospect of speaking to a sentient universe, as the Solitract assumes the form of a talking frog with Grace's voice, the Doctor explains she cannot stay as they are unable to co-exist. The Solitract releases her at her request, allowing her to make her way back through the Antizone before the portals collapse. After the adventure, Erik decides to return to Oslo with Hanne, while Ryan bonds with Graham and calls him "Grandad" for the first time.

=== Continuity ===
During the episode, Yasmin makes a suggestion to the Doctor to "reverse the polarity". This is a reference to a recurring phrase used by the Third Doctor during his stories in the original series.

== Broadcast and reception ==
Professional ratings
Aggregate scores
Source	Rating
Rotten Tomatoes (Average Score)	7.50
Rotten Tomatoes (Tomatometer)	93%
Review scores
Source	Rating
Entertainment Weekly	B
Daily Mirror	3/5 stars
Metro	3.5/5 stars
New York Magazine	4/5 stars
Radio Times	1/5 stars
The A.V. Club	A−
The Telegraph	4/5 stars
The Independent	5/5 stars
TV Fanatic	3/5 stars

=== Ratings ===
"It Takes You Away" was watched by 5.07 million viewers overnight, a share of 25.1% of the total United Kingdom TV audience, making it the fifth-highest overnight viewership for the night and the 27th-highest overnight viewership for the week on overnights across all UK channels. The episode received an official total of 6.42 million viewers across all UK channels, making it the 22nd most watched programme of the week, and it had an Audience Appreciation Index score of 80.

=== Critical response ===
The episode holds a 93% approval rating on Rotten Tomatoes, and an average score of 7.50/10 based on 27 reviews. The website's critical consensus reads, "Elevated by Bradley Walsh's comedically empathetic performance, 'It Takes You Away' overcomes most of its tonal incongruities to offer a compelling meditation on grief and guilt."
