= Ian Gelder =

British actor (1949–2024)

- In a 2016 episode of Game of Thrones
- Born: Ian Denbigh White; 3 June 1949; Gloucestershire, England
- Died: 6 May 2024 (aged 74)
- Occupation: Actor
- Years active: 1972–2024
- Partner: Ben Daniels (1993–2024)

Ian Denbigh White (3 June 1949 – 6 May 2024), known professionally as Ian Gelder, was a British actor. He was known for his numerous stage and screen roles, including Mr. Dekker in Torchwood: Children of Earth (2009) and Kevan Lannister in Game of Thrones (2011–2012; 2015–2016).

== Early life ==
Ian Denbigh White was born in Gloucestershire on 3 June 1949. He spent the later years of his childhood in Wokingham. Adopting his mother's maiden name of Gelder for his stage name, he began acting professionally in an ITV Sunday Night Theatre episode in 1972.

== Career ==
Gelder appeared in Rumpole of the Bailey as Rumpole's university lecturer son. He also played many other roles on stage and screen. His stage work includes The Low Road (2013). From May to July 2014 he performed as Marcus Andronicus, brother of Titus, in Lucy Bailey's revival of her original 2006 production of Titus Andronicus at Shakespeare's Globe Theatre.

He appeared in television programmes such as Torchwood: Children of Earth in 2009, and Game of Thrones, 2011 as Mr Dekker and Kevan Lannister respectively. After an absence of three years, Gelder reprised his role in the HBO series Game of Thrones in Season 5 and Season 6 as Kevan Lannister. Gelder guest-starred in 12 episodes for the series. In 2019, he guest-starred as Librarian Scholar Charles in the BBC TV series His Dark Materials, based on the critically acclaimed book trilogy by Philip Pullman. Then in 2020, he guest-starred as Zellin in the seventh episode of the twelfth season of Doctor Who, "Can You Hear Me?".

== Personal life and death ==
Gelder's partner was actor Ben Daniels. They met in 1993 during a London stage production of Joe Orton's Entertaining Mr Sloane. They lived in East Sussex.

Gelder died of complications from bile duct cancer on 6 May 2024, aged 74. Gelder's partner Daniels stopped working to take care of him, and remarked that he dealt with his "dreadful illness with such bravery".

== Filmography ==
=== Films ===
Year	Title	Role	Notes
1978	The Three Kisses	Lieutenant Arthur Raffleton	TV movie
1987	Little Dorrit	Reverend Samuel Barnacle	
1990	The Fool	Henry Gibbs	
1991	King Ralph	Riding Instructor	
1997	The Emissary: A Biblical Epic	King Agrippa	
1997	The Informant	British C.O.	
1998	Angels at My Bedside	Older Angel	Short film
1998	Jinnah	The English Police Officer	
2001	Hawkins	Tregawn	TV movie
2006	The Commander: Blacklight	John Carr	TV movie
2009	Pope Joan	Aio	
2015	Shakespeare's Globe: Titus Andronicus	Marcus Andronicus	Filmed stage version of Shakespeare's play from 2014
2019	Dark Ditties Presents: The Witching Hour	Selwyn Parsons	TV movie
2020	Surge	Alan	
2020	The Invisible Collection	Berkovic	Short film
2021	Dark Ditties Presents: Dad	Terry Vaughan	TV movie
2021	The Interlopers	Georg	

=== Television ===
Year	Title	Role	Notes
1972	ITV Sunday Night Theatre	Unnamed role	1 episode: "Three Months Gone"
1972	New Scotland Yard	Andrew Perks	1 episode: "A Case of Prejudice"
1973	Murder Must Advertise	Hector Puncheon	Mini-series, 1 episode: "Episode #1.3"
1973	The Donati Conspiracy	Dave Dent	3 episodes
1974	The Wide World of Mystery	Unnamed role	1 episode: "The Next Victim"
1974	Edward the King	Affie / Prince Alfred	Mini-series, 5 episodes
1975–1976	Play for Today	Andrew Patterson / Steve Riches	2 episodes
1976	Thriller	Small	1 episode: "The Next Victim"
1978	Spearhead	Lieutenant Preece	1 episode: "Loyalties"
1979	The Professionals	King	1 episode: "The Purging of CI5"
1980	Rumpole of the Bailey	Nick Rumpole	1 episode: "Rumpole's Return"
1984	I Thought You'd Gone	Tony	7 episodes
1988	London's Burning	Negotiator	1 episode: "Episode #1.5"
1989	Blackeyes	Rupert	Mini-series, 1 episode: "Episode #1.3"
1991	Van der Valk	Basten	1 episode: "Dangerous Games"
1991–1998	The Bill	Hulse / Maurice Cowans / Mike Naylor / Kenneth Grant	4 episodes
1992	The Ruth Rendell Mysteries	Peter Renton	1 episode: "An Unwanted Woman: Part Two"
1993	Poirot	Victor Astwell	1 episode: "The Underdog"
1993–2019	Casualty	Jeremy / Guy Chambers / Arthur Swain / Stan Villiers	4 episodes
1994	Chandler & Co	Rev. Ewan Price	1 episode: "Those Who Trespass Against Us"
1994	Screen Two	Visitor	1 episode: "Skallagrigg"
1994	The Day Today	Chanticlier Guardsley	Mini-series, 1 episode: "Stretchcast"
1995	Bugs	Vermeer	1 episode: "Hot Metal"
1995	Fist of Fun		4 episodes
1995	Absolutely Fabulous	David	1 episode: "Sex"
1997	Kavanagh QC	Dr. Clarke	1 episode: "Blood Money"
1997	Brass Eye	Dr. Jonathan Kwattes	1 episode: "Animals"
1998	McCallum	David Johnson	1 episode: "Harvest"
2004	My Dad's the Prime Minister	Elf	1 episode: "Powerless"
2006	Holby City	Paul Galvin	1 episode: "It's Been a Long Day"
2007	Fallen Angel	Canon Hinds	Mini-series, 1 episode
2009	Torchwood: Children of Earth	Mr Dekker	5 episodes
2009	Robin Hood	Archbishop Walter	1 episode: "The King Is Dead, Long Live the King"
2010	Silent Witness	Dr Stanley Jacobs	1 episode: "Shadows: Part 1"
2011	Psychoville	Butler	1 episode: "Hancock"
2011–2016	Game of Thrones	Kevan Lannister	12 episodes
2012	Endeavour	Stan Tremlett	1 episode: "Pilot"
2013	Mr Selfridge	Waring	2 episodes
2016	EastEnders	Dr. Adam Gorman	2 episodes
2016	Ripper Street	Joseph Chamberlain	1 episode: "The Strangers' Home"
2017	Queers	Jackie	Mini-series, 1 episode: "I Miss the War"
2017	Riviera	Druot the Solicitor	1 episode: "Faussaires / Counterfeiters"
2017	Snatch	Norman Gordon	9 episodes
2018	Lore	Aleister Crowley	1 episode: "Jack Parsons: The Devil and the Divine"
2018	Doctor Who	Remnants	Voice; episode: "The Ghost Monument"
2019	His Dark Materials	Charles	1 episode: "Lyra's Jordan"
2020	Doctor Who	Zellin	Episode: "Can You Hear Me?"
2024	Father Brown	Gabriel Hawksworth	1 episode: "The Father The Son"
