= Yasmin Khan (Doctor Who) =

Fictional character from Doctor Who

- Doctor Who character
- Mandip Gill as Yasmin Khan
- First appearance: "The Woman Who Fell to Earth" (2018)
- Last appearance: "The Power of the Doctor" (2022)
- Created by: Chris Chibnall
- Portrayed by: Mandip Gill
- Duration: 2018–2022

In-universe information
- Full name: Yasmin Khan
- Nickname: Yaz
- Species: Human
- Gender: Female
- Occupation: Police officer
- Affiliation: Thirteenth Doctor
- Relatives: Hakim Khan (father); Najia Khan (mother); Sonya Khan (younger sister); Umbreen (maternal grandmother)

Yasmin "Yaz" Khan is a fictional character created by Chris Chibnall and portrayed by Mandip Gill in the BBC science fiction television series Doctor Who. In the series' narrative, Yaz is a companion of the Thirteenth Doctor (Jodie Whittaker), an incarnation of the alien time traveller known as the Doctor.

Yaz is a probationary police officer from Sheffield and was introduced alongside companions Graham O'Brien (Bradley Walsh) and Ryan Sinclair (Tosin Cole) in "The Woman Who Fell to Earth" (2018). Following the departures of Ryan and Graham in "Revolution of the Daleks" (2021), she continues travelling with the Doctor and plays a prominent role in the Flux crisis alongside Dan Lewis (John Bishop). Yaz struggles with her sexuality and develops romantic feelings for the Doctor, but the two part ways in "The Power of the Doctor" (2022) after the Thirteenth Doctor is fatally wounded and prepares to regenerate. Gill reprised the role in the audio drama series The Thirteenth Doctor Adventures (2025–present), which follows Yaz and the Doctor's travels prior to Flux (2021).

The character of Yaz was widely criticised for being sidelined and underutilised, though audience reception somewhat improved with the exploration of her background in "Can You Hear Me?" (2020). Her relationship with the Thirteenth Doctor became popular among viewers, with the pairing dubbed "Thasmin" by fans. However, their romantic arc received mixed reviews, with some criticising its late development and lack of resolution, whilst others defended it as improving Yaz's characterisation. The development of Yaz marked several firsts for Doctor Who: she is the Doctor's first Asian companion, (Note: Freema Agyeman, who played the Doctor's companion Martha Jones, is of Iranian descent, though the character of Jones was depicted as being Black British.) the Doctor's first same-sex love interest, the Doctor's first love interest who is a person of colour, and part of the series' first all-female TARDIS team. Yaz is only the second companion to appear in every episode of an incarnation's tenure.

== Appearances ==
=== Television ===
Yasmin Khan (Mandip Gill) is introduced in the eleventh series premiere, "The Woman Who Fell to Earth". She is a 19-year-old probationary police officer from Sheffield who feels unfulfilled by the dull routine of her job. She attended primary school with Ryan Sinclair (Tosin Cole). Yaz, along with Ryan and his step-grandfather Graham O'Brien (Bradley Walsh), encounters the Thirteenth Doctor (Jodie Whittaker) and assists her in defeating the Stenza warrior T'zim-Sha. Yaz, Ryan and Graham join the Doctor in travels through time and space. Yaz returns home in "Arachnids in the UK", which introduces her family who live in a flat in the Park Hill estate: her parents, Hakim (Ravin J Ganatra) and Najia (Shobna Gulati), and her older sister, Sonya (Bhavnisha Parmar). Yaz subsequently decides she wants to fully join the Doctor on her travels.

In "Demons of the Punjab", Yaz asks the Doctor if she could go back in time to visit and learn about the life of her grandmother, Umbreen (Amita Suman). Thinking she'll meet her grandfather, being given his broken watch, she finds him nowhere. She decides to stay, despite the Doctor's warnings, becoming part of her grandmother's history during the Partition of India, where Umbreen's first husband died.

In "Can You Hear Me?", Yaz is forced to have nightmares by the immortal being Zellin (Ian Gelder). It is revealed that three years earlier, Yaz struggled with her mental health and ran away from home, but was talked into returning home by a police officer, Anita (Nasreen Hussain). In the present, Yaz locates Anita to express her gratitude.

In "Revolution of the Daleks", the Doctor spends ten months (from her companions' perspective) stuck in an alien prison. Yaz is the only one of her companions who believes that the Doctor will return. The Doctor is ultimately rescued by Jack Harkness (John Barrowman). Jack assures Yaz that, while it hurts to move on from life with the Doctor, it is worth the pain. After the Dalek crisis concludes, Ryan and Graham decide to remain on Earth to focus on rebuilding their own relationship and to safeguard Earth in the Doctor's absence. Yaz continues travelling with the Doctor.

In "The Halloween Apocalypse", the Doctor and Yaz pursue Karvanista, a mysterious figure from the Doctor's past. Yaz is frustrated by the Doctor's cagey and secretive behaviour. Their path crosses with Dan Lewis (John Bishop), an unemployed charity volunteer and amateur historian from 21st century Liverpool who has been kidnapped by Karvanista; the newly-formed trio fight back when the universe is decimated by the Flux. In "Village of the Angels", Yaz and Dan are transported back in time to 1901 by the Weeping Angels. They travel the globe for three years in "Survivors of the Flux", eventually finding a way to return to the present day in 1904 Liverpool. Yaz and Dan reunite with the Doctor to defeat the Flux, and he joins them to travel in the TARDIS, the Doctor's spaceship, in "The Vanquishers". The Doctor promises to finally open up to Yaz explaining everything troubling her. In "Eve of the Daleks", Yaz confesses to Dan that she has romantic feelings for the Doctor but doesn't know how to express them. In "Legend of the Sea Devils", the Doctor tells Yaz she reciprocates this affection but refuses to become involved with another human companion who will one day die.

In "The Power of the Doctor", Yaz helps save the Doctor from the Master (Sacha Dhawan) after he steals her body and hijacks the TARDIS. Yaz forces the Master from the TARDIS and recruits Vinder to save the Doctor from Daleks. With help from a hologram of the Fugitive Doctor (Jo Martin), Yaz restores the Doctor's body. After the Doctor is wounded by the Qurunx, Yaz rescues her and takes her back to the TARDIS. Realising that the Doctor is about to regenerate, Yaz and the Doctor take one last trip in the TARDIS and subsequently part ways. Shortly afterwards, Yaz is invited to a support group with Graham, Dan and other former companions to talk about their experiences with the Doctor.

=== Other media ===
Across October and November 2018, three Doctor Who tie-in novels were released—The Good Doctor, Molten Heart and Combat Magicks—all of which feature Yaz. She is depicted on the cover of Combat Magicks, for which Mandip Gill read the audiobook version.

In July 2024, it was announced that Gill would reprise her role as Yaz in The Thirteenth Doctor Adventures (2025–present), a licensed audio drama series produced by Big Finish Productions, which follows Yaz and the Thirteenth Doctor's travels between "Revolution of the Daleks" and "The Halloween Apocalypse".

== Development ==
=== Casting ===
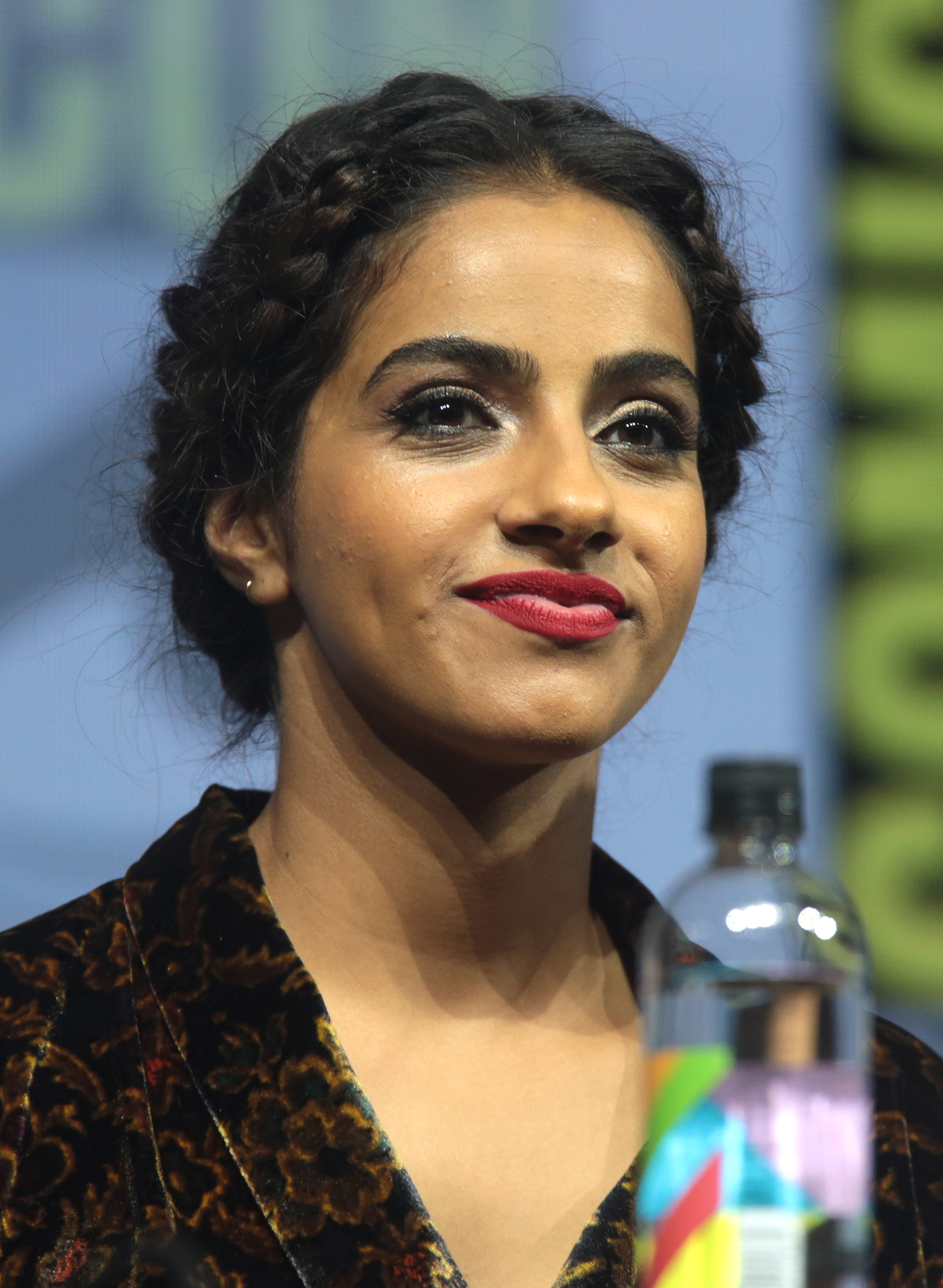
Mandip Gill plays Yasmin Khan.

The Doctor Who production team were specifically looking for a South Asian actress with a Northern English accent to play Yasmin Khan, a companion to the Thirteenth Doctor (Jodie Whittaker). Actress Mandip Gill, born in Leeds to a Sikh family, first auditioned for the role without knowing what series it was for (the production was using a codename for secrecy) and assumed the role would be merely a guest appearance. She was encouraged by casting director Andy Pryor to bring her own experiences to the character. At her second audition, Gill performed in front of Pryor and series showrunner Chris Chibnall and opposite Whittaker. Gill had long wanted to play a police officer, and she realised how strongly she wanted to play the character following her second audition. Safiyya Ingar, who was later cast as companion Valarie Lockwood in The Eleventh Doctor Chronicles audio drama series for Big Finish Productions, has mentioned in an interview that they were in the running to play Yaz.

On 22 October 2017, it was announced that Gill had joined the regular cast of the eleventh series of Doctor Who as Yasmin, alongside Tosin Cole and Bradley Walsh as Ryan and Graham. Gill noted the significance of Yaz's status as the Doctor's first Asian companion, stating that she "feel[s] really proud to have been part of the change in television". The casting of non-white actors Gill and Cole, in addition to the episodes "Rosa" (2018) and "Demons of the Punjab" (2018) which explored ethnic conflict, led to online backlash that the series had become too politically correct. Gill called the backlash "bizarre" and stated in 2022: "There are Asian and Black people living in Sheffield. We’re not something that [Chibnall] created."

Although Cole and Walsh left Doctor Who after its twelfth series, Gill stayed on for its thirteenth series as she was "not ready for this journey to end" and felt there "as a person and as a character, there's so much more to explore." Gill and Whittaker constituted Doctor Who's first all-female TARDIS team. Gill is present in every episode of the Thirteenth Doctor's tenure, which makes Yaz one of only two companions to appear throughout the entirety of an incarnation's tenure—the other is Rose Tyler who appeared throughout the Ninth Doctor's tenure in 2005. Gill and Whittaker both left the series following "The Power of the Doctor" (2022). This made Yaz one of the Doctor's longest-serving companions in the series's history.

=== Characterisation ===
Yaz is introduced as a 19-year-old probationary police officer from Sheffield, with a Pakistani Muslim background. Gill, aged 29 when cast, found it a challenge to portray a character much younger than herself. On her return to the role in The Thirteenth Doctor Adventures, Gill stated that Yaz felt more mature and grounded, which she attributed partly to her own age. She also sought for the character to be less cautious in the audio drama series compared to on television.

Prior to the production of the twelfth series, Gill met with Chibnall to discuss ideas for Yaz's character development. Gill's request to examine Yaz's motivations for joining the police partly inspired "Can You Hear Me?" (2020). The episode explored the character's mental health issues for the first time, which Gill hoped to expand on in the future. Gill stated that Yaz retains her identity as a Sheffield police officer, despite her travels in the TARDIS, and continues to serve others.

Yaz's mother, Najia Khan (Shobna Gulati) was introduced in the fourth episode of the eleventh series, "Arachnids in the UK" (2018). Najia's comments about whether Yaz and the Thirteenth Doctor were seeing each other led some viewers to interpret Yaz as queer. On a potential romance between Yaz and the Thirteenth Doctor, Gill noted she loved the positive fan reaction to the pairing and stated in December 2020 that "even though that storyline wasn't there – you want people to be talking about it... So to me, I'm here for it."

Following an implicit reference in "The Haunting of Villa Diodati" (2020), Yaz was revealed in "Eve of the Daleks" (2022) to be queer and in love with the Doctor. The Thirteenth Doctor's romantic feelings for Yaz were subsequently revealed in "Legend of the Sea Devils" (2022). This marked the first same-sex romance between the Doctor and a companion, as well as the first romance between the Doctor and a person of colour. Series producer Matt Strevens stated that the storyline was not planned when Yaz was introduced, but he helped incorporate it into the series when the thirteenth series was restructured due to the COVID-19 pandemic. In 2022, Chibnall stated the romance was unplanned: "You're in a constant dialogue with the show because you see things come through and you think, 'That’s interesting — we can slow burn that.' And that’s sort of what happened with this. If you look at "Arachnids in the UK" it's there front and centre in the scene where Yaz's mum asks, 'Are you two seeing each other?' and the Doctor says, 'I don’t think so. Are we?'

In September 2023, Chibnall described the characters' romance as "an unrequited love story". He intentionally avoided showing the characters kissing on-screen, stating "dramatically [and] emotionally, it felt slightly more wrenching if they didn't". The characters later engaged in a kiss in the 2026 audio drama The Violet Hour. In 2026, Chibnall stated that the romance is "now sometimes spoken about as an unrequited love story. But it’s not unrequited; it’s unconsummated."

== Reception ==
The development of Yaz's character in the eleventh and twelfth series was broadly criticised. Lacy Baugher of Nerdist characterised Yaz as the least developed of the Thirteenth Doctor's companions, as the presence of Graham and Ryan made for "too many companions and not enough story to go around". Thomas Bacon of Screen Rant agreed that the Thirteenth Doctor's companions were "under-developed and often sidelined". Maya Philips of Vulture ranked Yaz #8 in a 2018 ranking of the revived series's 10 companions. Melinda Houston, writing for The Sydney Morning Herald, noted that the dynamic between Yaz and the Thirteenth Doctor immediately improved once Graham and Ryan left the series. In February 2022, Andrew Blair of Den of Geek stated that Yaz's character was "based on what the episode needs her to be... rather than the other way around". Baugher noted that the series often ignored Yaz's police background and stated that "there are moments where Doctor Who could not seem less interested in Yaz’s journey." The exploration of her background in "Can You Hear Me?" was warmly received by fans, though Blair was disappointed that this was not followed up on.

Yaz and the Thirteenth Doctor became a popular ship among Doctor Who fans, and the hashtag #Thasmin often trended on Twitter. However, with only two episodes left in the Thirteenth Doctor's era, Yaz's coming out storyline was widely criticised for being "too little, too late" to make a meaningful impact. Bacon criticised the previously ambiguous treatment of Yaz's sexuality and called the storyline a "forced way to create a deeper emotional investment in the [Thirteenth Doctor's] coming regeneration". Blair noted that though the storyline was developed in retrospect, it was the first time Gill "really had something strong to play". Molly Moss of the Radio Times rejected criticisms, arguing that there was nothing problematic about the relationship developing from the natural chemistry between Gill and Whittaker. She also noted that Doctor Who has historically avoided Doctor-companion romance, and that said romances have usually been depicted as celibate or unrequited. Gill stated that young Doctor Who fans had approached her to share that Yaz's struggle with her sexuality had helped them come out to their parents.

Yaz's exit from the series received criticism from viewers and critics. Diane Darcy of Comic Book Resources negatively compared it to the romantic storyline of the Tenth Doctor and Rose Tyler: "history seemingly repeated itself, but somehow worse than before". She stated that the characters "could've parted ways on a more satisfactory note" and stated it lacked the passion of Rose's farewell in "Doomsday" (2006). CBR's Maddie Davis agreed that "Chibnall undoubtedly dropped the ball there" and felt it represented a wider problem in the media with a lack of LGBTQ+ television writers. /Film's BJ Colangelo described Yaz and the Doctor's relationship as queerbaiting and felt it had an intentional lack of closure.
