= Mandip Gill =

English actress (born 1988)

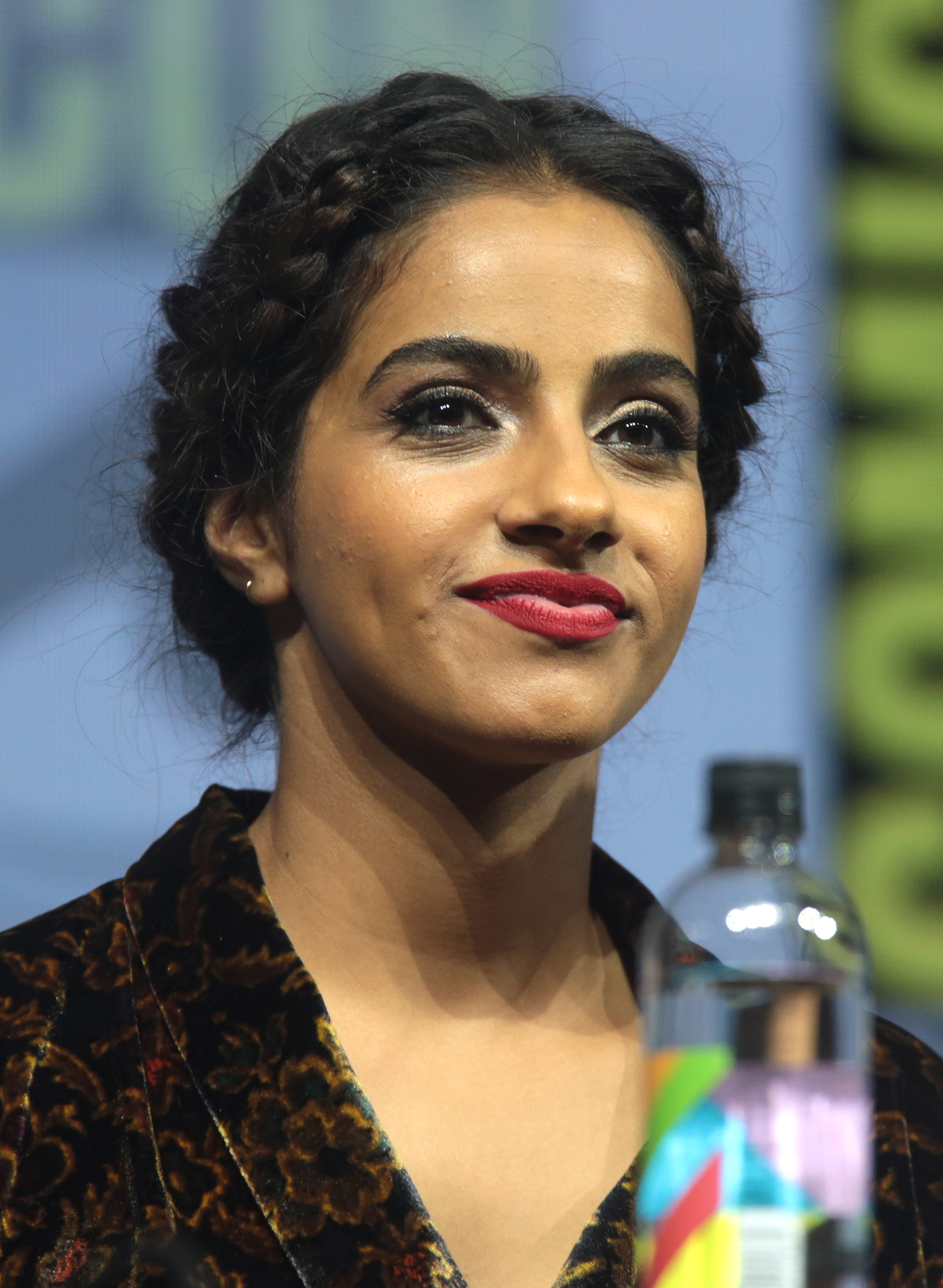
- Gill at the 2018 San Diego Comic-Con
- Born: 5 January 1988 (age 38); Leeds, West Yorkshire, England
- Education: University of Central Lancashire (BA)
- Occupations: Actress; narrator
- Years active: 2009–present
- Known for: Hollyoaks; Doctor Who

Mandip Gill (born 5 January 1988) is a British actress and narrator. Her first television role came in 2012 when she was cast as Phoebe McQueen in the Channel 4 soap opera Hollyoaks. After departing the series in 2015, Gill went on to have guest roles in Cuckoo, Doctors, The Good Karma Hospital and Casualty. In October 2017, the BBC announced that Gill had been cast as companion Yasmin Khan in the 2018 series of Doctor Who. She appeared in every episode of Jodie Whittaker's tenure as the Thirteenth Doctor, in series 11, 12 and 13 as well as a series of specials in 2022.

== Early life and education ==
Mandip Gill was born in Leeds, West Yorkshire, on 5 January 1988. She is of Indian Punjabi descent and is a Sikh.

Growing up on a council estate in the suburb of Middleton, where her parents owned a newsagents, she attended a primary school in the area before enrolling in Cockburn School. At fourteen, her family moved to Allerton Bywater, where she attended Brigshaw High School.

She graduated from the University of Central Lancashire in 2009 with a BA (Hons) degree in acting.

== Career ==
Gill appeared in several theatre productions, before landing her first television role as Phoebe Jackson (later McQueen) in the Channel 4 soap opera Hollyoaks. Gill had attended a number of auditions for the soap in the past and she was unsure if the character of Phoebe was right for her, but after a number of callbacks, Gill was given the role. Phoebe was introduced as a homeless teenager and a friend for established character George Smith (Steven Roberts). Gill chose to leave the show in 2015 and Phoebe was killed off as part of the long-running "Gloved Hand Killer" storyline. The following year, Gill had a guest role in the BBC sitcom series Cuckoo, before appearing in Doctors for a five episode arc. Gill played Shazia Amin, a pregnant homeless woman. In 2017, Gill appeared in The Good Karma Hospital and an episode of Casualty. She also appeared in Kay Mellor's BBC drama Love, Lies and Records as Talia, a junior registrar.

In October 2017, the BBC announced that Gill had been cast in the eleventh series of Doctor Who, as a companion to the Thirteenth Doctor, played by Jodie Whittaker, starting in 2018. Gill was joined by her former Hollyoaks colleague Tosin Cole, who plays Ryan Sinclair, another of the Doctor's companions. Gill continued to appear in the twelfth and thirteenth series, as well as a series of specials airing in 2022.

In May 2022, Gill made her West End theatre debut in the play 2:22 A Ghost Story.

In September 2023, Gill starred in the BBC Radio 4 afternoon drama Janey Takes Off.

In July 2024, it was announced that Gill would reprise her role as Yaz in a new series of Doctor Who audio dramas featuring the Thirteenth Doctor from Big Finish Productions alongside Jodie Whittaker, with the series set to release from 2025.

In 2026 Gill stars in Can You Keep a Secret?, a BBC sitcom starring Dawn French.

== Filmography ==
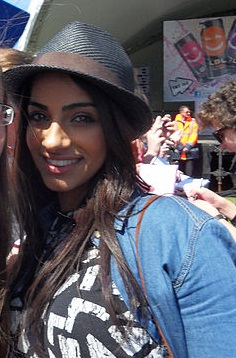
Gill in 2010

Key
†	Denotes productions that have not yet been released

=== Film ===
Year	Title	Role	Notes	Ref.
2016	Rwd/Fwd	Charlie	Short film	
2019	The Flood	Reema		
2020	Five Dates	Shaina	Interactive film with over 7 hours of filmed footage and 10 possible outcomes	
2021	On Air	Megan	Short film	
2022	Welcome to the Club	Therapist	Short film	
2024	This Time Next Year	Leila		
TBA	Hush Little One †	Maya	Short film	

=== Television ===
Year	Title	Role	Notes	Ref.
2012–2015	Hollyoaks	Phoebe McQueen	Series regular; 242 episodes	
2016	Cuckoo	Lauren	Episode: "The Holiday"	
2016	Doctors	Shazia Amin	Recurring role; 5 episodes	
2017	The Good Karma Hospital	Padma Kholi	2 episodes	
2017	Casualty	Nasreen Mahsud	Episode: "Swift Vengeance Waits"	
2017	Love, Lies and Records	Talia	All 6 episodes	
2018	Doctor Who Access All Areas	Herself	Guest; 10 episodes	
2018–2022	Doctor Who	PC Yasmin Khan	Main role (series 11–13, 2022 specials); 31 episodes	
2020	Alton Towers: A Rollercoaster Year	Narrator	Television film	
2021	Comic Relief 2021	Hospital Doctor	Charity sketch: "2020: The Movie"	
2021–2022	A Lake District Farm Shop	Narrator	11 episodes	
2022	Suspicion	Sonia Chopra	Recurring role; 3 episodes	
2022	The Snowman: The Film That Changed Christmas	Narrator	One-off special	
2023	A Cotswolds Farm Shop	Narrator	6 episodes	
2024	Curfew	Sarah	6 episodes	
2024–2025	Big Lizard	D.O.R.I.S.	50 episodes	
2025	Badjelly	Dinglemouse	5 episodes	
2025	Cooper and Fry	DC Diane Fry	4 episodes	
2026	Can You Keep a Secret?	PC Neha Fendon	6 episodes	

=== Video games ===
Year	Title	Role	Notes
2022	Desta: The Memories Between	Nila (voice)	

=== Theatre ===
Year	Title	Role	Notes	Ref.
2009	The Secret Life of John Cooper Clarke	Jools	Naloxone Theatre Ensemble	
2010	Not In My Name	A'ishah / Hana	Theatre Veritae	
2010	Remember Me	Jessica	Contact Theatre	
2010–2011	Crystal Kisses	Ally	Contact Theatre	
2015	Britannia Waves the Rules	Goldie / Carl's Mum	Royal Exchange Theatre and UK tour	
2016	Deepa the Saint	Tej	Dark Horse Festival	
2022	2:22 A Ghost Story	Jenny	Criterion Theatre	

=== Audio ===
Year	Title	Role	Production	Notes	Ref.
2023	Janey Takes Off	Kayleigh	BBC Radio 4		
2025–present	Doctor Who: The Thirteenth Doctor Adventures	PC Yasmin Khan	Big Finish Productions	6 stories	

== Awards and nominations ==
Year	Award	Category	Work	Result	Ref.
2018	International Achievement Recognition Awards	Best Emerging Actress	Love, Lies and Records	Nominated	
2018	I Talk Telly Awards	Best Newcomer	Doctor Who	Won	
2018	Radio Times's Reader Awards	Breakout Talent	Doctor Who	Won	
2019	Eastern Eye's Arts Culture & Theatre Awards	People's Choice Award	Doctor Who	Won	
2021	TweetFest Film Festival's Panel Awards	Best Actress	On Air	Won	
