= Tosin Cole =

American-British actor (born 1992)

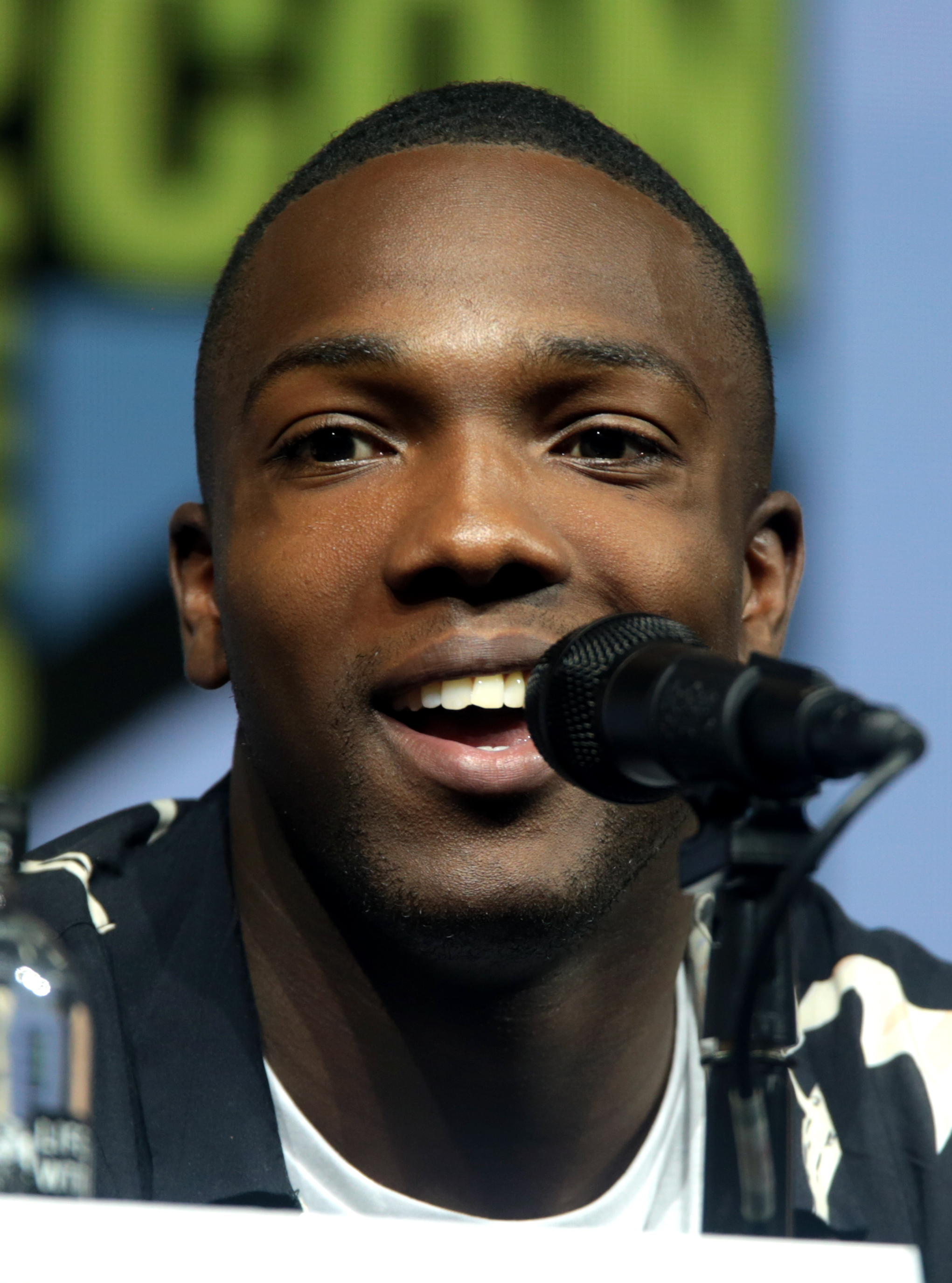
- Cole at the 2018 San Diego Comic-Con
- Born: 23 July 1992 (age 34); Florida, U.S.
- Citizenship: United Kingdom; United States
- Occupation: Actor
- Years active: 2009–present
- Notable work: The Cut; EastEnders: E20; Hollyoaks; Doctor Who; Supacell

Tosin Cole (/ˈtoʊsɪn/; born July 23, 1992) is an American-British actor. He is known for various roles in British television series and films. He began his on-screen career starring in The Cut and EastEnders: E20, later securing a regular role as Neil Cooper in the soap opera Hollyoaks and Ryan Sinclair in Doctor Who. In 2024, Cole appeared in Netflix's Supacell in a lead role.

== Early life ==
Cole was born in Florida to parents of Yoruba ethnic, Nigerian heritage and raised in New York City. The family moved from New York to London when Cole was 8, where he attended Abbey Wood Secondary School in Greenwich. He left school before his A-levels to pursue a career in acting.

Although Cole holds dual British and American citizenship, he considers himself British.

== Career ==
In 2009, Cole was part of a theatre production titled Wasted!, a modern reproduction of Shakespeare's Julius Caesar, produced by Intermission Theatre, a company which helps teenagers stay away from crime. In 2010, Cole joined the cast of BBC teen drama The Cut, in which he played the role of Noah Achebe, who was introduced in the third series. In 2011, he filmed parts in two short films titled Me and My Dad and Jasmine.

Cole later secured the role of Sol Levi in EastEnders: E20, a spin-off of the British soap opera EastEnders. The role required Cole to learn to dance and perform his routine in front of professional dance group Flawless in the series finale. He was quoted as saying the experience was "very, very, very stressful." Cole said it was a privilege to work on E20 and said the cast were fantastic. Cole then agreed to reprise the role for the third series. He was then cast as a regular character in soap opera Hollyoaks as Neil Cooper. Neil was one of six new characters the programme introduced, playing the role from 2011 until the character's death in a bus explosion in 2012. He also filmed a television advert as part of the serial's promotional push for the new characters.

The actor went on to appear in a 2013 episode of the BBC medical drama Holby City as Keith Potts. He also played his first cinematic film role in Gone Too Far!, portraying Razer. This was followed by another film role in Second Coming. In 2014, came the role of Anthony in the drama The Secrets. In 2015, Cole played the characters of Djimon Adomakoh in ITV drama Lewis and Kobina in an episode of historical series Versailles. That year Cole also had a brief appearance in the film Star Wars: The Force Awakens, as the X-Wing pilot Lt. Bastian.

On 4 October 2017, Cole starred in the short film Father of Man. He then played Amjad in the film Unlocked. On 22 October 2017, it was announced that Cole had been cast in the eleventh series of Doctor Who, playing Ryan Sinclair, a companion to The Doctor, played by Jodie Whittaker, starting in 2018. Cole departed the role in 2021 making his last appearance in the New Year's Day special "Revolution of the Daleks".

In August 2022, Tosin Cole was announced as a lead character alongside an ensemble cast in Netflix's Supacell, directed by Rapman. The six episode series was released on 27 June 2024.

== Filmography ==
Key
†	Denotes works that have not yet been released

=== Film ===
Year	Title	Role	Notes
2011	Jasmine	Tyler	1st Short film
2013	Gone Too Far!	Razer	
2014	Second Coming	Troy	
2014	Honeytrap	Andre	
2015	The Enchanted Rose	Jude	Short film
2015	Shelter	Ash	Short film
2015	Star Wars: The Force Awakens	Lt. Bastian	
2016	Roadkill	Den (Younger)	Short film
2017	Burning Sands	Frank	
2017	Father of Man	Alex Jacobs	Short film
2017	Unlocked	Amjad	
2019	The Souvenir	Phil	
2020	Certified Black Genius	Kaye	Short film
2021	The Souvenir Part II	Phil	
2021	Pirates	Clips	
2021	Ear for Eye	US Young Adult	
2022	Homeless Talent	Chris	Short film
2022	Till	Medgar Evers	
2023	House Party	Damon	
2024	Bob Marley: One Love	Tyrone Downie	
2026	The Sheep Detectives	Caleb	
2027	Children of Blood and Bone †	Tzain	Post-production

=== Television ===
Year	Title	Role	Notes
2010	The Cut	Noah Achebe	Series regular 1st Credit
2010–2011	EastEnders: E20	Sol Levi	Series regular
2011–2012	Hollyoaks	Neil Cooper	Series regular
2012	Hollyoaks Later	Neil Cooper	Series regular
2013	Holby City	Keith Potts	Episode: "The Cost of Loving"
2014	The Secrets	Anthony	Episode: "The Return"
2015	Lewis	Djimon Adomakoh	2 episodes
2015	Versailles	Kobina	Episode: "Mirror for Princes"
2018	Doctor Who Access All Areas	Himself	Guest; 10 episodes
2018–2021	Doctor Who	Ryan Sinclair	Main role; 22 episodes (Series 11–12)
2022	61st Street	Moses Johnson	Main role; 8 episodes
2024–present	Supacell	Michael	Main role; 6 episodes

=== Theatre ===
Year	Title	Role	Venue
2009	Sixteen	Tyrone	The Gate / SPID Theatre
2009	Blainabe	Michael	Intermission Youth Theatre
2009	Wasted	Casca	Intermission Youth Theatre
2010	Verona Road	Romeo	Intermission Youth Theatre
2011	Pandora's Box	Tope	Oval House Theatre
2011	Mad About the Boy	The Boy	West Yorkshire Playhouse
2013	HMP Macbeth	Malcolm	Intermission Youth Theatre
2015	Stop	Kriston	Trafalgar Theatre
2016	They Drink It in the Congo	William / Samo / Oliver / Kevin	Almeida Theatre
2018	Ear for Eye	Young Adult	Royal Court Theatre
2024	Shifters	Dre	Off-West End, Bush Theatre
2024	Shifters	Dre	West End, Duke of York's Theatre

=== Video games ===
Year	Title	Role
2027	Clutch †	Theo Martial
