= Doctor Who specials (2022) =

2022 specials of British sci-fi TV series

Doctor Who
- 2022 specials
- DVD cover art for the first two specials
- Showrunner: Chris Chibnall
- Starring: Jodie Whittaker; Mandip Gill; John Bishop; Sophie Aldred; Janet Fielding
- No. of stories: 3
- No. of episodes: 3

Release
- Original network: BBC One
- Original release: 1 January – 23 October 2022

Season chronology
- ← Previous; Series 13 Next → 2023 specials

The 2022 specials of the British science fiction television programme Doctor Who are three additional episodes that follow the programme's thirteenth series. The specials aired on BBC One on 1 January, 17 April, and 23 October, respectively. They are the final episodes to be overseen by Chris Chibnall as showrunner. Chibnall wrote all three specials, co-writing the second with Ella Road. They were directed by Annetta Lauger, Haolu Wang, and Jamie Magnus Stone, respectively.

The specials star Jodie Whittaker as the Thirteenth Doctor as well as Mandip Gill and John Bishop as her time-travelling companions, Yasmin Khan and Dan Lewis. Whittaker, Gill, and Bishop also departed the series at the end of the third special. The final episode also stars Sophie Aldred and Janet Fielding as former companions Ace and Tegan Jovanka.

The first two episodes were produced alongside the preceding series while the third was commissioned later to coincide with the BBC's centenary. Filming took place from June–October 2021 and was impacted by the COVID-19 pandemic. Some other members of the production staff also exited the programme once production was complete. The three specials were seen as an improvement on the previous series but received some criticism to the resolution of its overall story arc and saw a decline in viewing figures.

== Episodes ==
| No. story | No. special | Title | Directed by | Written by | Original release date | UK viewers (millions) | AI |
|---|---|---|---|---|---|---|---|
| 298 | 1 | "Eve of the Daleks" | Annetta Laufer | Chris Chibnall | 1 January 2022 | 4.40 | 77 |
On New Year's Eve, Nick, a frequent customer, arrives at ELF Storage, to the irritation of the owner, Sarah. The Doctor, Yaz and Dan attempt to reset the TARDIS to remove damage and anomalies caused by the Flux, intending to spend time at a beach. Instead, it lands in ELF Storage and creates a time loop to protect them from their impending deaths. As Nick exits his storage unit, he gets exterminated by a Dalek which then proceeds to kill Sarah and the TARDIS crew. The loop then resets and the events repeat themselves. Each time it resets, it shortens by a minute. Together, they have to figure out how to escape before the time loop closes; a Dalek execution squad assembles and advances their tactics with each loop. Dan begins to suspect that Yaz and the Doctor share romantic feelings. They encounter many of the strange things that Jeff, Sarah's employee, keeps in the complex, including boxes of fireworks and high explosives. As the loop closes, the group move unpredictably to outsmart the Daleks until they trick them into shooting the boxes of fireworks, destroying the facility and the Daleks, while facilitating their escape.
| 299 | 2 | "Legend of the Sea Devils" | Haolu Wang | Ella Road and Chris Chibnall | 17 April 2022 | 3.47 | 76 |
Geomagnetic anomalies cause the TARDIS to land in 1807 China, whereupon the Doctor, Yaz and Dan encounter the pirate queen Madame Ching and young villager Ying Ki, after Ching accidentally frees the rampaging Sea Devil Marsissus from imprisonment. Ching reveals to Dan and Ying she is searching for the legendary sailor Ji-Hun's lost treasure. The Doctor and Yaz discover that Ji-Hun apparently made a pact with the Sea Devils but was betrayed. They infiltrate the Sea Devils' undersea lair, bluffing them into inspecting Ji-Hun's rebuilt ship, and find and free Ji-Hun from stasis aboard. The Doctor learns that the key to Marsissus' imprisonment, Ying's gem, which he inherited from Ji-Hun's trusted crewmate's descendants, is necessary for the Sea Devils to flood and colonise Earth. The TARDIS crew, Ching, Ying and Ji-Hun engage the Sea Devils in a swordfight. The Doctor uses the gem to disrupt the Sea Devils' plans, but Ji-Hun sacrifices himself to ensure the sabotage succeeds. Ching recovers the treasure while the Doctor and Yaz discuss their feelings for each other.
| 300 | 3 | "The Power of the Doctor" | Jamie Magnus Stone | Chris Chibnall | 23 October 2022 | 5.30 | 82 |
The Doctor and her companions stop a Cyberman attack, but Dan is nearly killed and returns home. A renegade Dalek contacts the Doctor, claiming that the Daleks need to be destroyed. Kate Stewart causes the Doctor to reunite with former companions Tegan and Ace, the Doctor learns the Master, the Cybermen and the Daleks plan to end humanity by erupting volcanoes worldwide. The Doctor is lured by the renegade Dalek, who betrays her, allowing the Daleks to capture her. The Master sends a miniaturised Ashad, a foe of the Doctor, to Tegan, which acts as a portal to bring the Cybermen to UNIT. The Daleks take the Doctor to the Master, who forces her to regenerate into him. An AI program of past incarnations of the Doctor leads Ace to meet former companion Graham O'Brien and destroy the volcano machine, Tegan to destroy the Cyberman converter, and Yaz and Vinder, an ally of the Doctor, to force the Master to undo the Doctor's transformation. Defeated, the Master mortally wounds the Doctor, forcing her real regeneration; she talks with Yaz about how she doesn't want it to end. Yaz departs to attend a companion support group alongside Dan, Graham, and many other surviving companions, while the Doctor regenerates into the Fourteenth Doctor, who discovers that he has regained the form of his tenth incarnation.

== Casting ==
=== Main characters ===
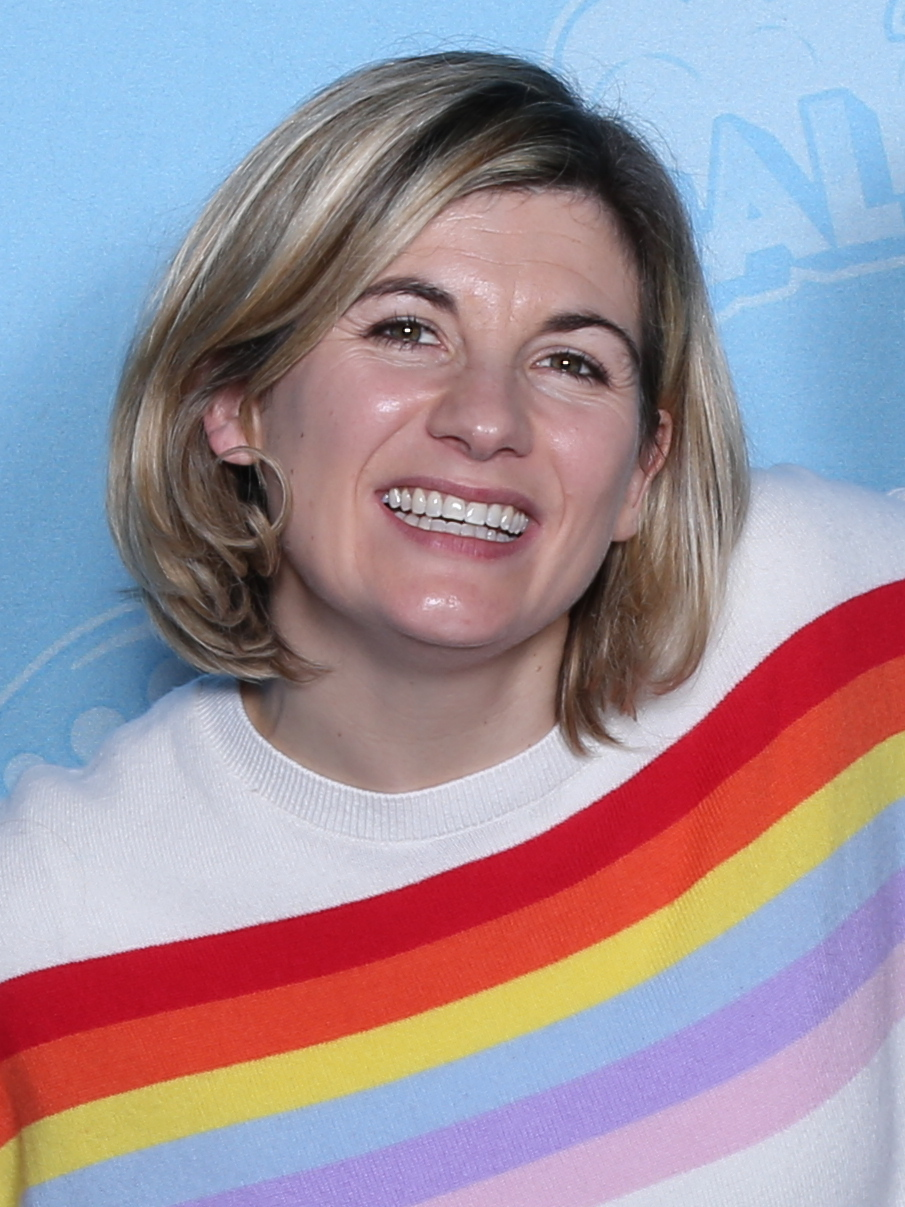
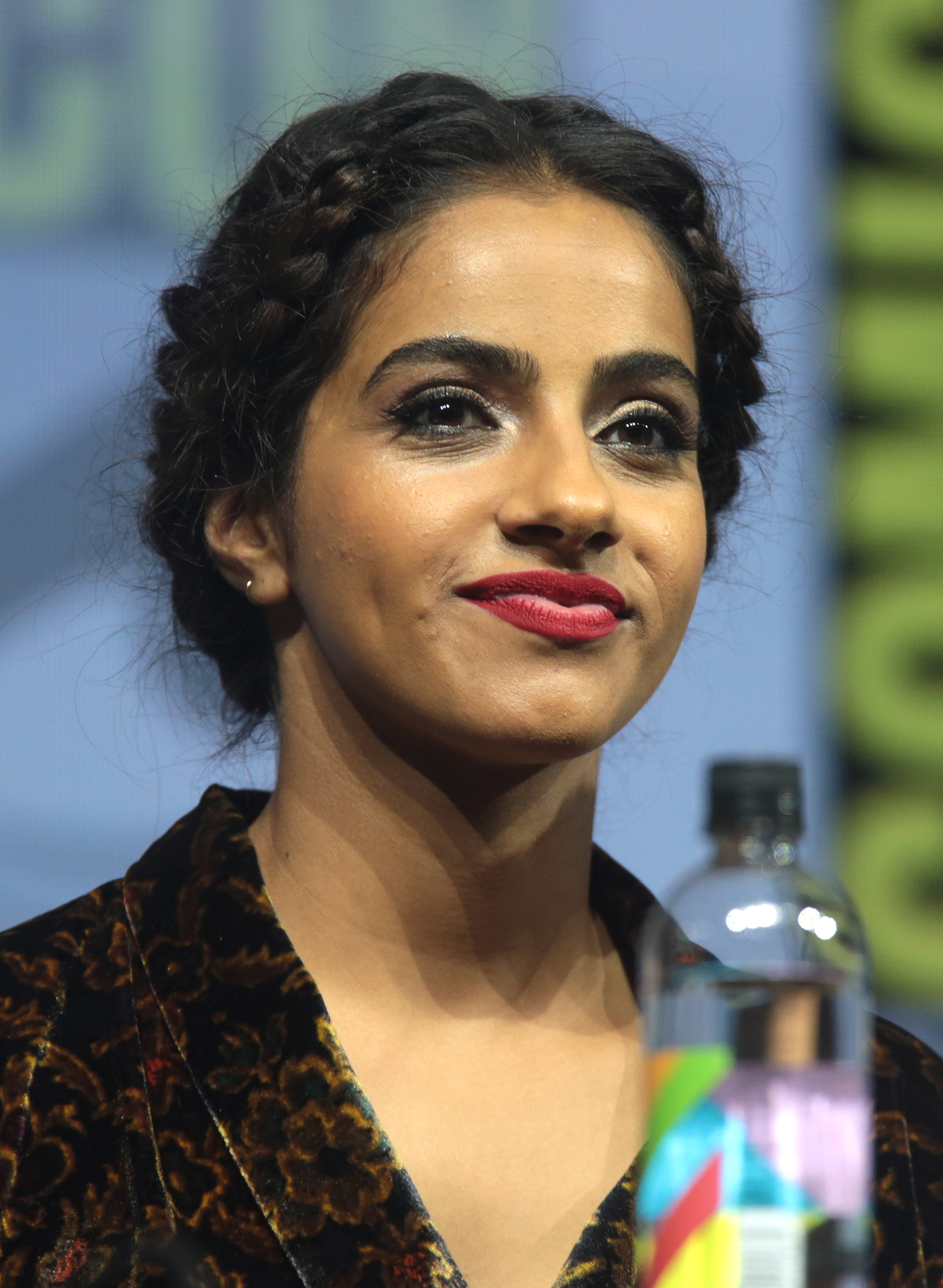
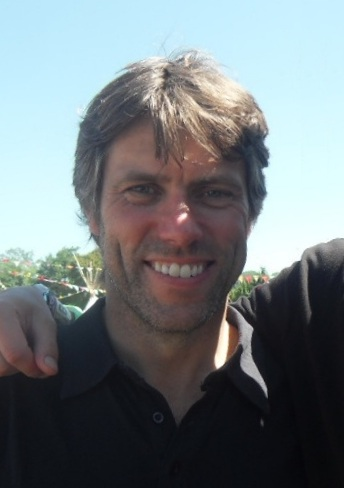
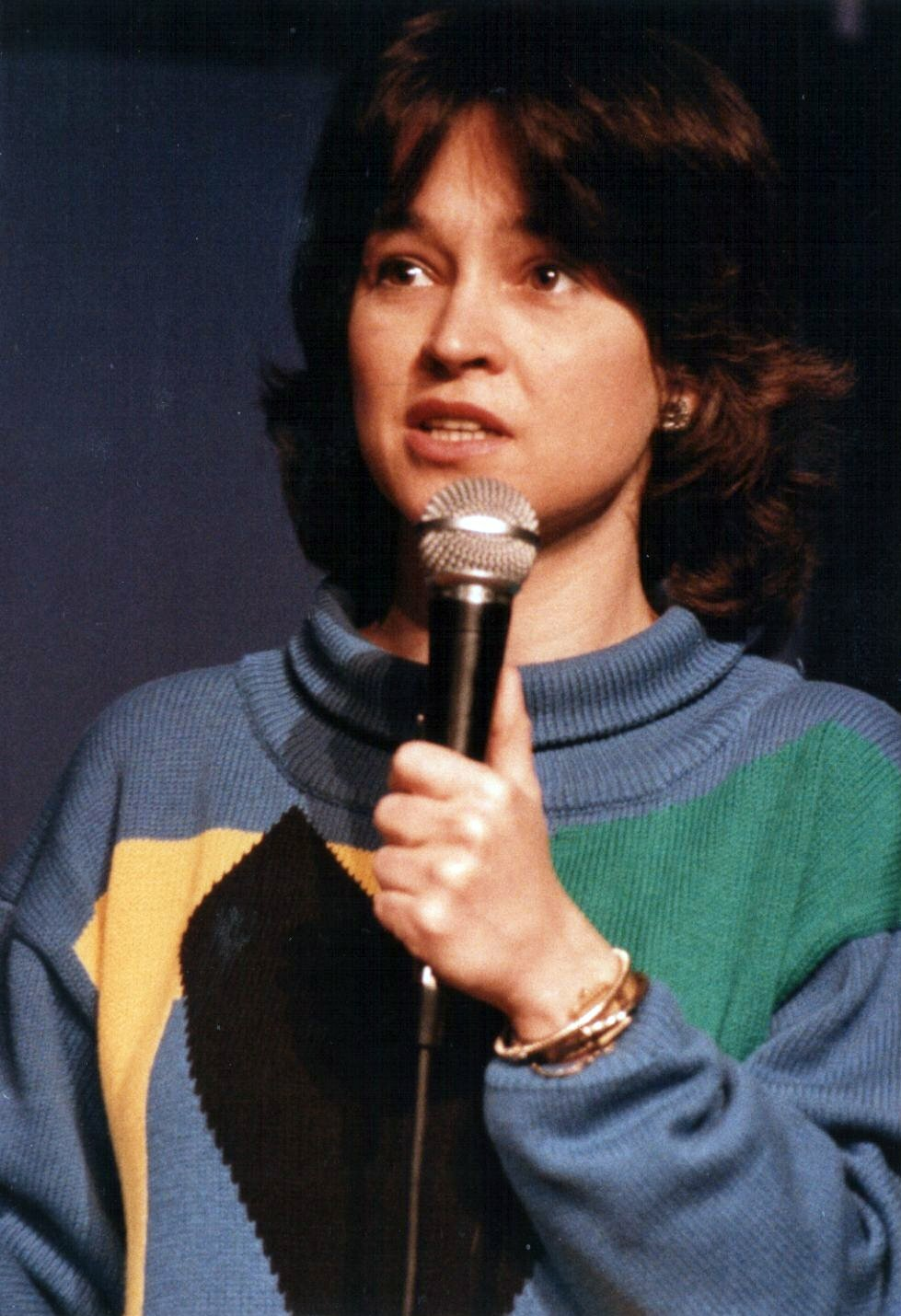
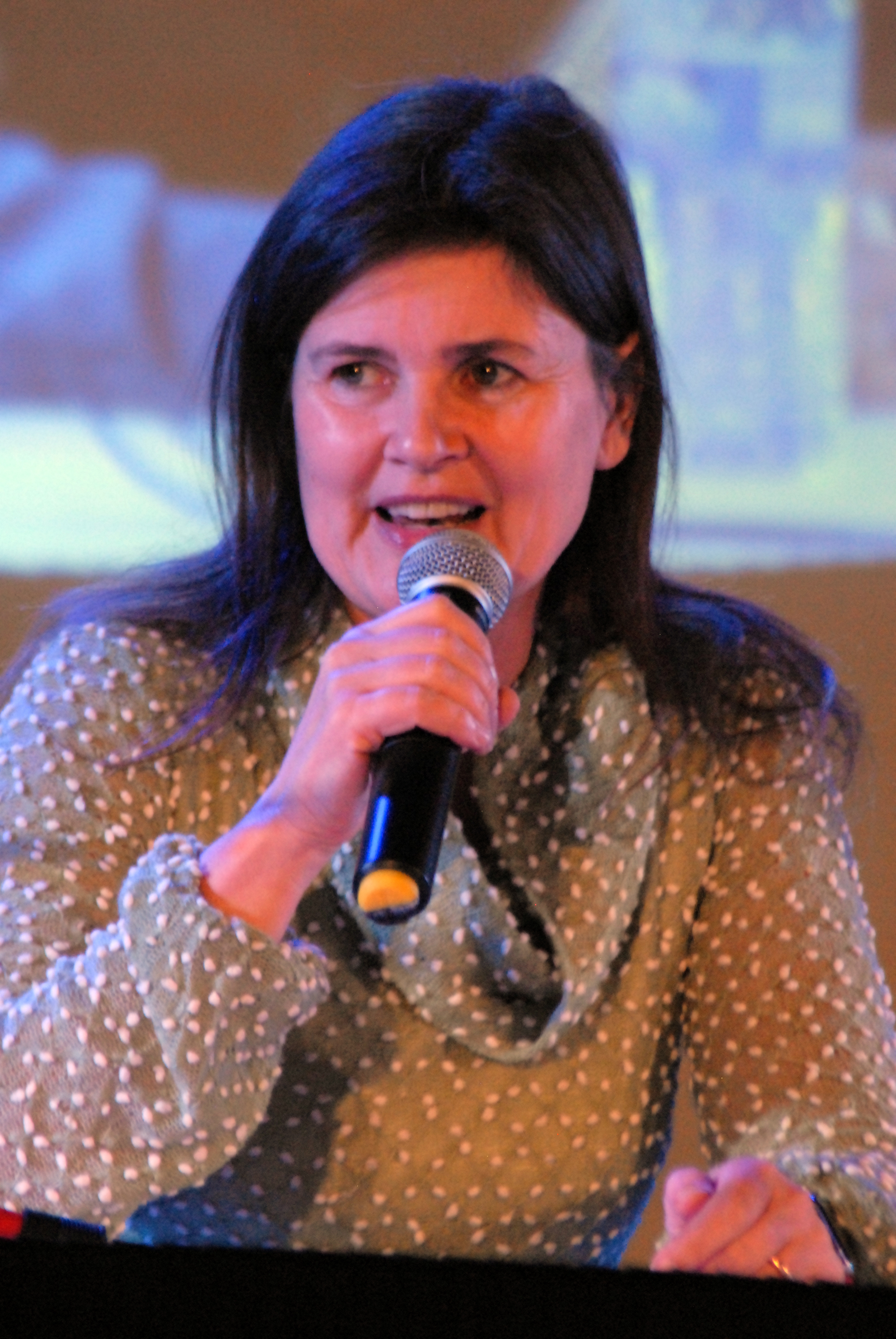
Jodie Whittaker, Mandip Gill, and John Bishop (top, left to right) led the main cast across the three specials, while Janet Fielding and Sophie Aldred (bottom) also headlined the final special.

Jodie Whittaker returned as the thirteenth incarnation of the Doctor for the three episodes, with the final special being the last regular appearance of Whittaker in the role. Mandip Gill and John Bishop also return as Yasmin Khan and Dan Lewis, respectively. Gill and Bishop initially stated they were unsure if they would depart after the third special. but Gill confirmed her departure from the show in the final special on 3 May 2022. while Bishop's exit was confirmed following its broadcast. Janet Fielding and Sophie Aldred also headlined the final special, returning to the programme as former companions Tegan Jovanka and Ace. Fielding last appeared in the programme in 1984 while Aldred was last seen in 1989. On their return, Chibnall said he believed Fielding and Aldred's original eras to be representative of specific times in Doctor Who's history.

=== Guest characters ===
In November 2021, it was reported that Aisling Bea and Pauline McLynn would appear in the New Year's Day special. Bea portrayed Sarah, the owner-operator of ELF self storage. Adjani Salmon appeared as Nick, a regular customer of Sarah's. Nicholas Briggs voiced the Daleks. Jonny Dixon returned from "The Woman Who Fell to Earth" (Whittaker's first episode) reprising his role as Karl Wright. Chibnall later revealed that the role of Sarah role was specifically created for Bea while casting Salmon was the idea of Rebecca Roughan, a script editor on the programme.

In "Legend of the Sea Devils", Crystal Yu was cast to play Madame Ching while Arthur Lee and Marlowe Chan-Reeves guest starred as Ji-Hun and Ying Ki. David K. S. Tse appeared as Ying Wai while Craig Els played Marsissus, the chief Sea Devil. Nadia Albina returned from series 13 as Diane.

"The Power of the Doctor" featured the largest number of returning characters. Sacha Dhawan and Patrick O'Kane reprised their roles as the Spy Master and Ashad respectively. Both Jemma Redgrave (Kate Lethbridge-Stewart) and Jacob Anderson (Vinder) returned from series 13, the former having reprised her role after six years. Briggs once again voiced the Daleks, as well as the Cybermen. The episode saw David Bradley, Peter Davison, Colin Baker, Sylvester McCoy, Paul McGann and Jo Martin make cameo roles as previous incarnations of the Doctor. Davison stated he was delighted to return and that he was "always very happy to come back." McCoy felt very emotional about his return and was glad to finally give closure to the Seventh Doctor and Ace.

While Chibnall had planned to include Tom Baker due to scheduling conflicts this was not possible. Chibnall did not ask Christopher Eccleston, Matt Smith or Peter Capaldi as he wanted the focus on the classic Doctors. David Tennant, who previously portrayed the Tenth Doctor, is introduced as the Fourteenth Doctor.

Bradley Walsh guest starred as Graham O'Brien, a former companion of the Thirteenth Doctor. Actors of other former companions, Ian Chesterton, Jo Jones and Mel Bush, portrayed by William Russell, Katy Manning and Bonnie Langford, appear together in a brief cameo near the end of the episode. In an interview with Doctor Who Magazine, Langford described her appearance in the episode as being "last minute" and was pleased with the fan reception to the scene. Russell's appearance set a record for longest gap between TV appearances.

== Production ==
=== Development ===
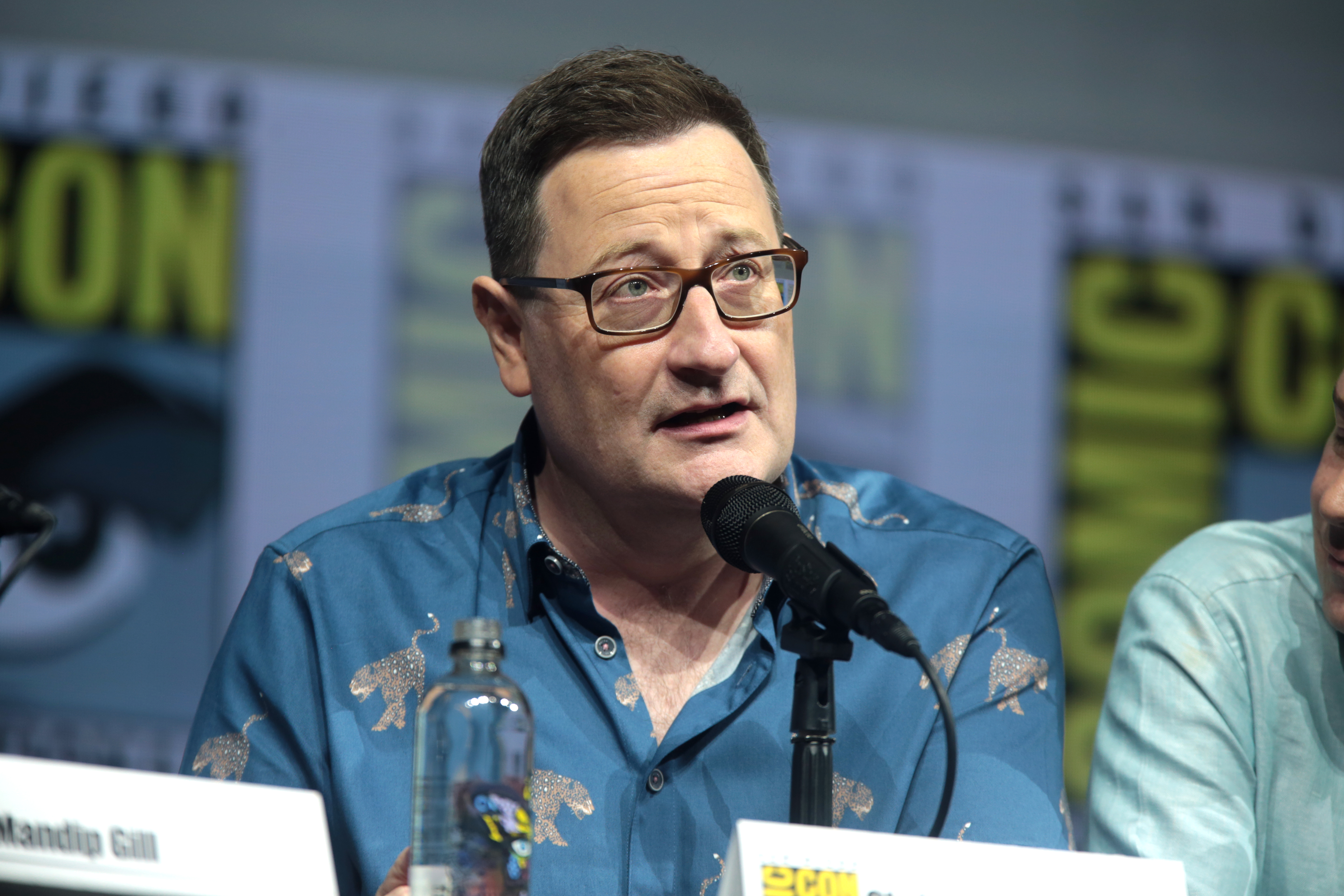
Chris Chibnall continued as showrunner for the three specials, but exited the programme once production was complete.

On 29 July 2021, the British Broadcast Corporation (BBC) announced that Chris Chibnall, who serves as executive producer and showrunner of Doctor Who, would depart the series alongside Whittaker after a run of specials in 2022. Chibnall stated their departures were part of a "three series and out deal" he made with Whittaker prior to the eleventh series. Whittaker furthered this sentiment, stating "We knew that we wanted to ride this wave side by side, and pass on the baton together."

The first two specials were produced as part of the eight episodes ordered for the thirteenth series. The BBC's Chief Content Officer, Charlotte Moore, later commissioned a third special which would be feature-length to coincide with the centenary of the BBC and serve as Whittaker's regeneration episode. It was also the 300th Doctor Who story since the programme's inception in 1963.

Ahead of the final special airing, it was reported that executive producer Matt Strevens and Nikki Wilson, a co-executive producer, would also depart once production on the centenary special was complete. Strevens originally joined the series alongside Chibnall. Wilson had been a part of the show since "The Sontaran Stratagem" (2008), and also worked on its spin-off show, The Sarah Jane Adventures. Composer Segun Akinola later announced that he would not return after the final special.

=== Writing ===
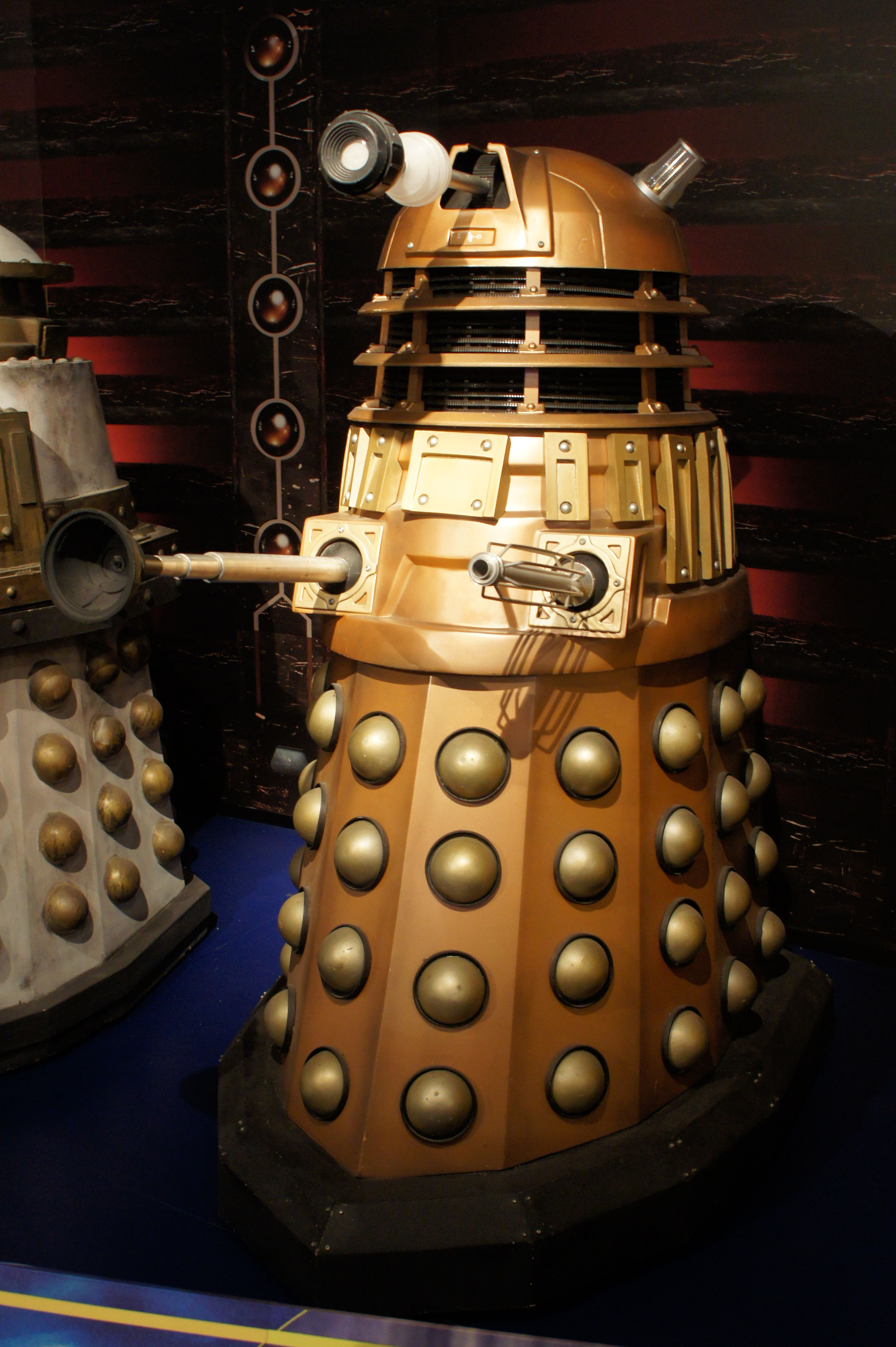
The Daleks featured in two of the three specials.

Chibnall continues as the head writer for the traditional New Year's special "Eve of the Daleks", which features the Daleks in a loose trilogy that connects their appearances in the past New Year's specials, "Resolution" (2019) and "Revolution of the Daleks" (2021). Chibnall also wrote the following two specials, co-writing the second, "Legend of the Sea Devils", with Ella Road. The second special features the return of the Sea Devils in their first appearance since Warriors of the Deep (1984). This episode included pirate-themed elements which Chibnall wanted to include after plans for a similar story fell through during production of the thirteenth series. One of Road's major contributions to this special was the addition of the historical figure Zheng Yi Sao, also known as Madam Ching.

The third and final special, "The Power of the Doctor", sees the Daleks, the Cybermen, and The Master. It is the first episode to feature all three in the same story. Reportedly, Chibnall had planned to include the Master in the next regeneration story since the twelfth series and had reached out to Sacha Dhawan, who portrayed the Master, for suggestions on how to incorporate the character. Dhawan said he wanted to explore the theme of the Master's disguises, which was used as a major plot thread of the episode. Chibnall also included a number of Easter eggs and cameos in this episode from past Doctor Who actors. He cited the extended length of the special as the reason for this. Returning showrunner Russell T Davies penned the episode's final moments.

The three episodes explored an overarching plot of a potential same sex romance between the Thirteenth Doctor and Yaz. Chibnall and Strevens revealed that this narrative was not originally in the plans for the story arc of the characters, but that they chose to incorporate it into the programme after viewers began shipping them and began referring to the two as "Thasmin". Road also contributed to this storyline in her episode, stating that it "felt really special" to write and mentioning that she is queer herself.

The writing team ultimately opted for the two characters not to kiss on screen, with Chibnall explaining that it felt more emotional than if they had. After the episode aired Chibnall also said that if he "had to make a decision about Yaz and the Thirteenth Doctor again, he would make it differently". The specials also furthered other threads, such as that around "the timeless child", which began in previous series', and the impact of the Doctor's impending regeneration.

=== Filming ===
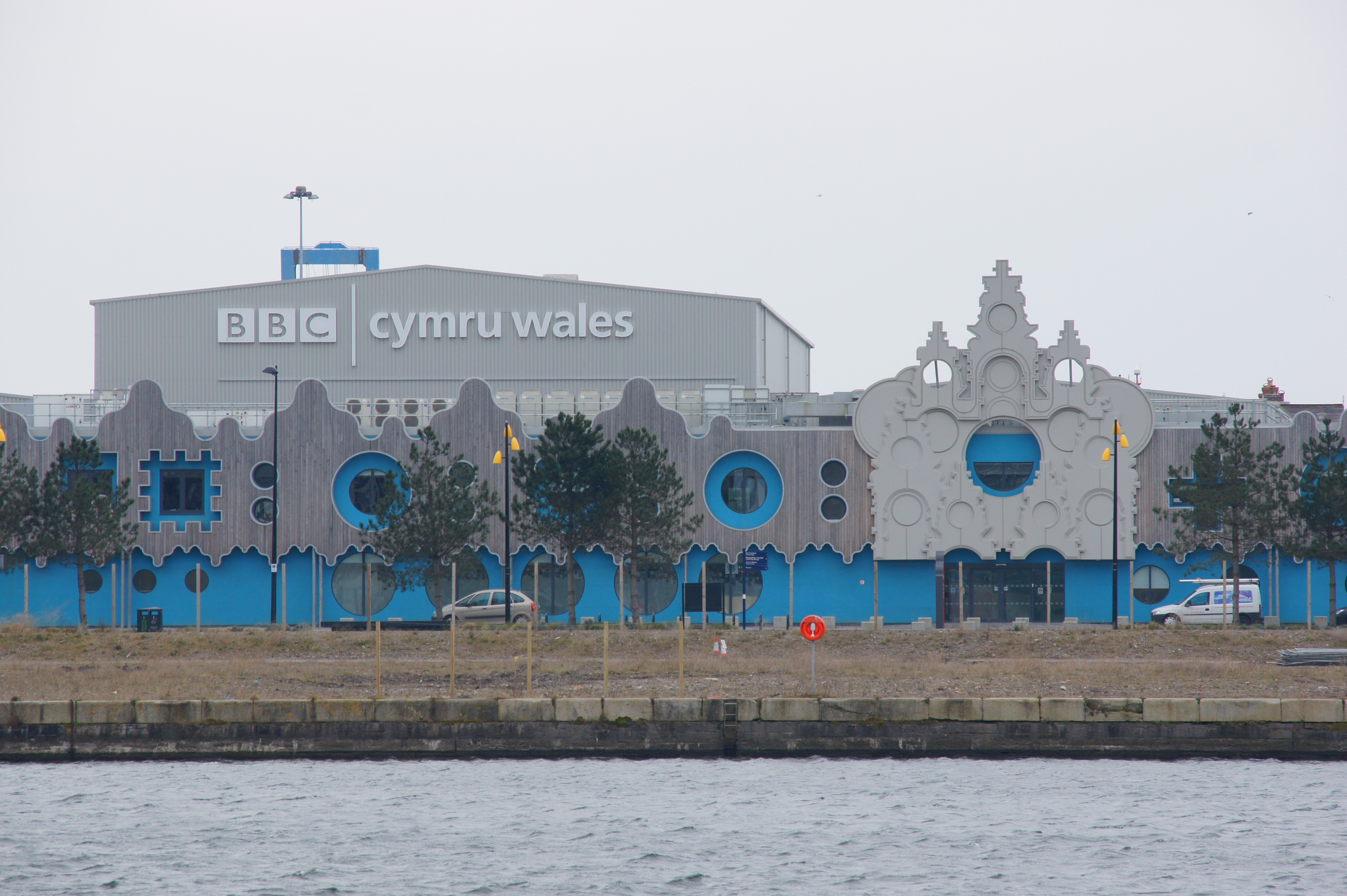
The series held sound stages at Roath Lock Studios (pictured).

Filming for the first two specials occurred in the same production run as the thirteenth series, also known as Flux. The majority of soundstage filming took place at Roath Lock Studios (pictured) in Cardiff, Wales. Production on all episodes was affected by the impact of COVID-19 on television leading to virtual meetings, budgetary concerns, and travel constraints.

Annetta Laufer directed "Eve of the Daleks" which was filmed in Bristol in June 2021 with cinematographer Robin Whenary. Laufer was hired after a producer was impressed with some of her previous work. Laufer and Whenary used cinematic techniques while recording the episode.

Filming for "Legend of the Sea Devils" followed throughout June and July with a mix of sound stage and location shooting. Haolu Wang made her television directorial debut with this episode while Mark Waters was the episode's cinematographer. Some recording took place at Sully Beach and Cardiff Bay. Principal photography wrapped on this special by 25 July.

"The Power of the Doctor" filmed in Cardiff in September and October with director Jamie Magnus Stone. Some filming occurred at Hodge House, Grange Gardens, and the Gate Arts Centre. The regeneration scene was filmed on a green screen which was overlaid on backdrop footage recorded elsewhere. The main cast concluded filming their scenes by 13 October, but additional photography continued the following day. Whittaker stated that filming her regeneration scene "was singularly the most emotional day on set" and that "it was a wonderfully-celebratory-slash-grief-ridden day". The three specials were in picture lock by February 2022 while post-production and visual effects work continued later into the year. The final moments of "The Power of the Doctor" were filmed on 13 May 2022, also on a green screen, with Rachel Talalay directing, as Stone was unavailable.

Production blocks were arranged as follows:

| Block | Episode | Director | Writer(s) | Producer |
|---|---|---|---|---|
| 1 | New Year's special: "Eve of the Daleks" | Annetta Laufer | Chris Chibnall | Sheena Bucktowonsing |
| 2 | Easter special: "Legend of the Sea Devils" | Haolu Wang | Ella Road and Chris Chibnall | Nikki Wilson |
| 3 | BBC Centenary special: "The Power of the Doctor" | Jamie Magnus Stone | Chris Chibnall | Nikki Wilson |

== Release ==
=== Promotion ===
The first details of the New Year's Day special, "Eve of the Daleks", were revealed following the conclusion of the thirteenth series. An eight-minute trailer for this episode was released on 28 December 2021, which also featured a time loop format by having the same content repeat itself for the first seven minutes and nine seconds. Details of "Legend of the Sea Devils" were published after the first special aired. Ahead of the second special, Scottish musician Nathan Evans released a Doctor Who-themed adaptation of the sea ballad "Wellerman". Promotional images introducing the new Sea Devil design were published on 26 March 2022, followed by a trailer and promotional poser on 2 April. The social media campaign for this episode circulated the phrase "Swashbuckle your seatbelts", referencing the term swashbuckler. A teaser trailer for the centenary episode, without yet revealing the title or airdate, was likewise released after the second special aired. The title of the special, "The Power of the Doctor", was announced in Doctor Who Magazine on 14 September 2022.

=== Broadcast ===
Two of the eight thirteenth series episodes were already set to be held for broadcast in 2022. The first of the three specials was broadcast in the United Kingdom on BBC One on 1 January 2022 in the series' traditional New Year's Day time slot. The following specials were also broadcast on BBC One; the second special aired on 17 April 2022 as an Easter special, with the third and final special airing on 23 October 2022 as part of the BBC's Centenary celebrations. All three episodes were also broadcast on BBC America in the United States, on CTV Sci-Fi in Canada, and on ABC TV Plus in Australia, where the first special also aired on ABC Television.

=== Home media ===
"Eve of the Daleks" and "Legend of the Sea Devils" received a joint DVD and Blu-ray release in across several regions in 2022. "The Power of the Doctor" was released on the same formats later in the year. All three episodes were also distributed as a Blu-ray SteelBook in region 2 beginning on 7 November 2022. The three specials were included in a complete release of all Whittaker's Doctor Who episodes in region 1.

- ^{(B)} indicates a Blu-ray release
- ^{(D,B)} indicates a simultaneous DVD and Blu-ray release

| Series | Story no. | Episode name | Duration | Release date | | |
| Series | Story no. | Episode name | Duration | R2 | R4 | R1 |
|---|---|---|---|---|---|---|
| 2022 specials | 298–299 | Doctor Who : "Eve of the Daleks" & "Legend of the Sea Devils" | 1 × 50 min. 1 × 60 min. | 23 May 2022^{(D,B)} | 13 July 2022^{(D,B)} | 28 June 2022^{(D,B)} |
| 2022 specials | 300 | Doctor Who : "The Power of the Doctor" | 1 × 90 min. | 7 November 2022^{(D,B)} | 7 December 2022^{(D,B)} | 13 December 2022^{(D,B)} |
| 2022 specials | 298–300 | Doctor Who : The Series 13 Specials | 1 × 50 min. 1 × 60 min. 1 × 90 min. | 7 November 2022^{(B)} | —N/a | —N/a |
| 11, 12, 13, 2022 specials | 277–300 | Doctor Who: The Complete Jodie Whittaker Years (DVD includes "Twice Upon a Time") | 20 × 50 min. 1 × 55 min. 7 × 60 min. 2 × 65 min. 1 × 70 min. 1 × 90 min. | —N/a | —N/a | 25 April 2023^{(D)} 5 November 2024^{(B)} |

=== Soundtracks ===
Doctor Who: Series 13 – The Specials

Soundtrack album by Segun Akinola
- Released: 2–16 December 2022 (digital); 13 January 2023 (CD)
- Genre: Soundtrack
- Length: 179:01
- Label: Silva Screen Records
- Producer: Segun Akinola

Doctor Who soundtrack chronology
| Doctor Who: Series 13 – Flux (2022) | ''Doctor Who: Series 13 – The Specials'' (2022) | Doctor Who: Time and the Rani (2023) |

On 18 November 2022, composer Segun Akinola announced that three individual soundtracks featuring selected pieces of score from each special would be digitally released on 2, 9, and 16 December 2022, respectively. A physical CD release containing all three soundtracks was released on 13 January 2023.

Disc 1 – "Eve of the Daleks"
| No. | Title | Length |
|---|---|---|
| 1. | "Here We Are Again" | 2:16 |
| 2. | "Out of Service" | 3:26 |
| 3. | "I Am Not Nick" | 2:33 |
| 4. | "Déjà Vu" | 3:39 |
| 5. | "The Correction" | 3:06 |
| 6. | "Sorry Sorry Sorry" | 1:09 |
| 7. | "Not a Great Plan" | 6:57 |
| 8. | "Took You Long Enough" | 8:43 |
| 9. | "We Will Not Stop" | 3:50 |
| 10. | "We Go Again and We Win" | 4:01 |
| 11. | "The Doctor Cannot Save You" | 3:28 |
| 12. | "A Brilliant Plan" | 3:56 |
| 13. | "Important Stuff to Do" | 4:11 |
| 14. | "Fireworks" | 3:06 |
| Total length: | | 54:21 |

Disc 2 – "Legend of the Sea Devils"
| No. | Title | Length |
|---|---|---|
| 1. | "You Have No Idea What You're Doing" | 2:47 |
| 2. | "Catching a Whopper" | 3:55 |
| 3. | "Pirate Queen" | 7:33 |
| 4. | "Who Wants to Be Next?" | 5:06 |
| 5. | "Celestial Navigation" | 3:59 |
| 6. | "Going up" | 7:26 |
| 7. | "Say Hello to My Crew" | 5:18 |
| 8. | "This Is Gonna Be Tricky" | 4:48 |
| 9. | "A Good Legend" | 6:06 |
| Total length: | | 46:58 |

Disc 3 – "The Power of the Doctor"
| No. | Title | Length |
|---|---|---|
| 1. | "You Shall Not Disrupt Our Mission" | 6:54 |
| 2. | "We Should Go in" | 2:52 |
| 3. | "Why Would I Ever Trust You?" | 7:00 |
| 4. | "Dealing with Multiple Somethings" | 6:38 |
| 5. | "Magnificent Attention to Detail" | 3:20 |
| 6. | "A Calculated Risk" | 5:40 |
| 7. | "Say Hello to My Friends" | 4:34 |
| 8. | "I Am the Doctor" | 2:37 |
| 9. | "We Are Not Finished" | 6:02 |
| 10. | "What's the Plan?" | 7:47 |
| 11. | "Reunite" | 7:17 |
| 12. | "All Hands on Deck" | 3:30 |
| 13. | "Activate Everything" | 6:11 |
| 14. | "She's the Doctor" | 7:20 |
| Total length: | | 77:42 |

== Reception ==
=== Ratings ===
"Eve of the Daleks" experienced a 300,000 decline in viewership compared to that of the thirteenth series finale broadcast a month earlier. With 4.4 million total viewers, it also saw a decline in year-over-year data when compared to the two previous New Year's Day specials. "The Power of the Doctor" peaked at 4.04 million in its final moments. The three specials averaged 4.39 million viewers in consolidated data, which is lower than the average of 4.8 million seen in the previous series and 5.4 million average brought in by the twelfth series. Strevens defended the programme's lower ratings, stating that they were "very strong" for a broadcast series. They also maintained an average television share of 18.3%. The episodes have an averaged appreciation index of 78, the highest score being "The Power of the Doctor" with 82 and the lowest being "Legend of the Sea Devils".

In the United States, Doctor Who averaged 340,667 viewers in its first broadcast on BBC America, also down overall from Flux and Whittaker's debut series.

| No. | Title | Air date | Overnight ratings | | Consolidated ratings | | Total viewers (millions) | AI | Ref(s) |
| No. | Title | Air date | Viewers (millions) | Rank | Viewers (millions) | Rank | Total viewers (millions) | AI | Ref(s) |
|---|---|---|---|---|---|---|---|---|---|
| 1 | "Eve of the Daleks" | 1 January 2022 | 3.21 | 5 | 1.19 | 25 | 4.401 | 77 | |
| 2 | "Legend of the Sea Devils" | 17 April 2022 | 2.20 | 9 | 1.27 | 24 | 3.465 | 76 | |
| 3 | "The Power of the Doctor" | 23 October 2022 | 3.71 | 4 | 1.59 | 5 | 5.295 | 82 | |

=== Critical response ===
Doctor Who specials: Critical reception by episode
Specials (2022): Percentage of positive critics' reviews tracked by the website Rotten Tomatoes

On the review aggregator website Rotten Tomatoes, 78% of 32 reviews are positive, with an average rating of 6.63/10 for all three specials. Critics felt that the specials were an improvement on the previous series.

Screen Rant's Craig Elvy wrote that the "2022 specials are avoiding the mistakes that killed Flux", explaining that the standalone episodic format serves the story better than the seralised format of Flux. Writing for The Mary Sue, Sarah Barrett ranked the specials as the fourteenth best series of modern Doctor Who.

"Eve of the Daleks" was praised for its comedic tone. Screen Rant's Mark Donaldson labeled the episode "Chibnall's funniest Doctor Who script". Den of Geek's Andrew Blair felt that both "Eve of the Daleks" and "The Power of the Doctor" were among the best Thirteenth Doctor episodes.

Diane Darcy with Comic Book Resources (CBR) noted the parallels between the romantic relationship of the Tenth Doctor and Rose and the Thirteenth Doctor and Yaz, writing that "history seemingly repeated itself, but somehow worse than before". CBR's Maddie Davis stated that "Chibnall undoubtedly dropped the ball there" and felt it represented a wider problem in the media with a lack of LGBTQ+ television writers. Many critics felt the Thasmin plotline was queerbaiting, and /Film's BJ Colangelo felt it had an intentional lack of closure. Some viewers criticised the resolution of this story arc.
