= Thasmin =

Ship between two fictional characters in Doctor Who

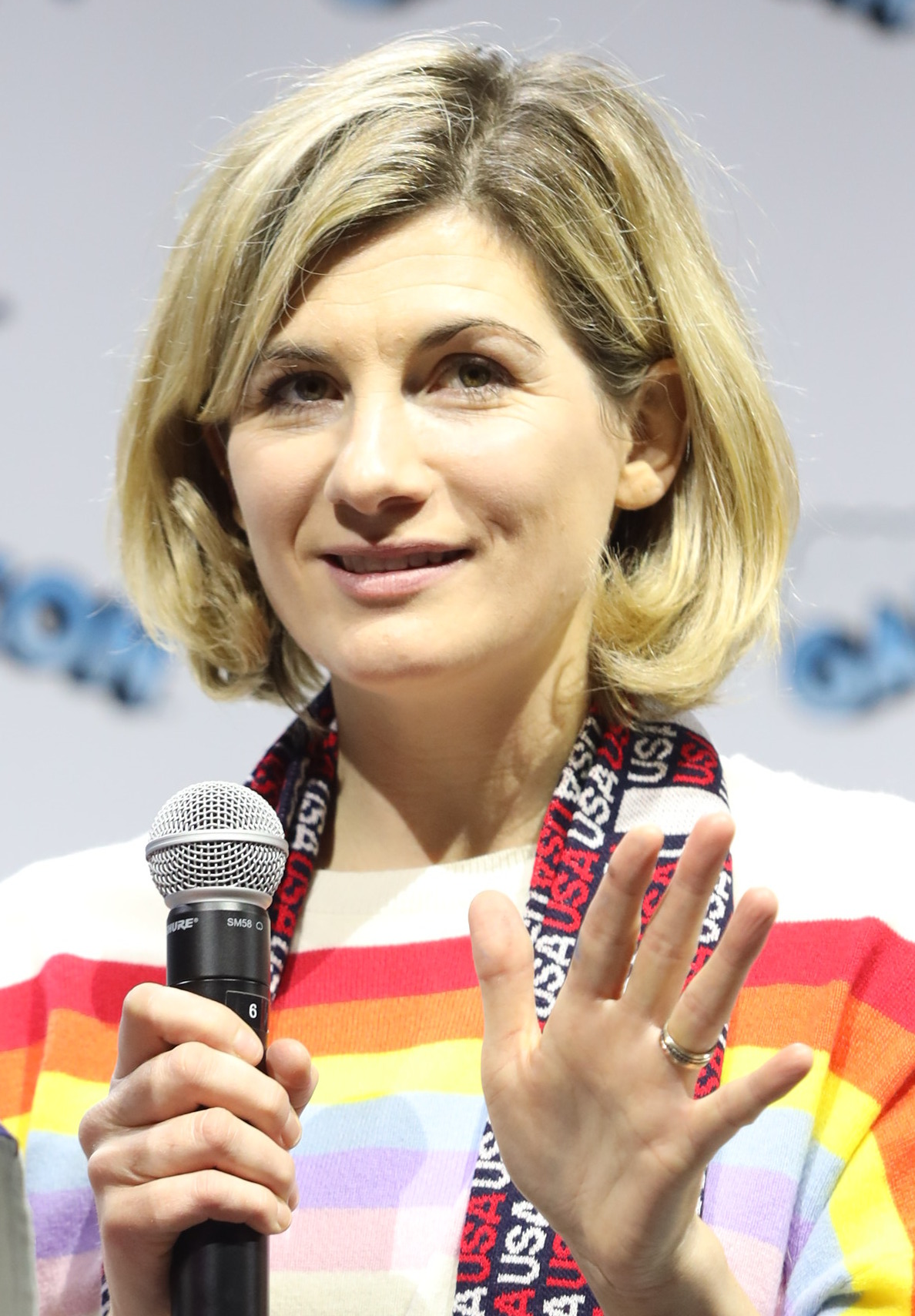
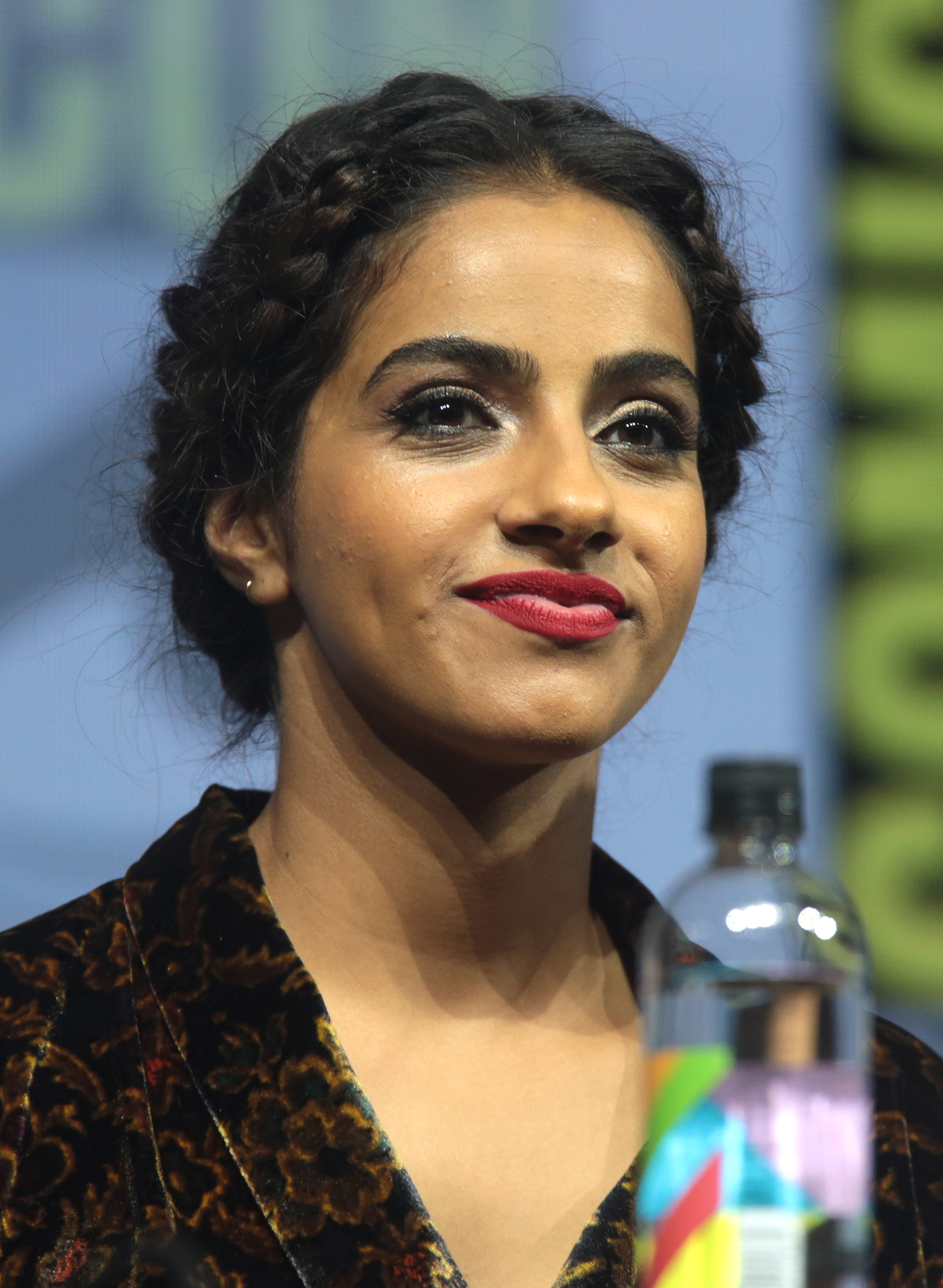
Jodie Whittaker (left) and Mandip Gill (right), respectively, depict the Thirteenth Doctor and Yasmin Khan in the series

Thasmin is a fan-nickname given to the ship, a relationship between two fictional characters desired by fans, and later on-screen romance between the thirteenth incarnation of the Doctor, the main character of science fiction television series Doctor Who, and her travelling companion Yasmin Khan. The two characters, portrayed by actresses Jodie Whittaker and Mandip Gill, were shipped as a result of comments made by a character in the 2018 episode "Arachnids in the UK", after which it grew popular in the form of Internet memes and slash fiction. Both Whittaker and Gill became aware of the ship, and Whittaker brought it up with series showrunner Chris Chibnall, who was enthusiastic about including it in the series. The ship was eventually incorporated into the television series, with the romance ending as a result of the departure of both Whittaker and Gill from the series in 2022.

Reception to the ship has been primarily positive, with praise directed towards it as a positive representation of queer and LGBTQ+ communities, though it has been criticized as queerbaiting by some due to how their relationship concluded.

== History and development ==
Prior to the Thirteenth Doctor and Yasmin's romance, Doctor Who had previously featured numerous openly queer characters, such as the bisexual Jack Harkness and lesbians such as Madame Vastra and companion Bill Potts. Romance between the Doctor and other characters had also been seen multiple times in the series prior such as between the Ninth and Tenth Doctors with Rose Tyler, the Eleventh Doctor with Clara Oswald, and the Twelfth Doctor with characters such as Missy and River Song. Despite this, the relationship between the Thirteenth Doctor and Yaz was the first time in the series' history that the Doctor had been in an openly LGBTQ+ relationship.

The ship first came about following the airing of the 2018 episode "Arachnids in the UK", in which Yaz's mother asked if Yaz and the Doctor were in a relationship, and Yaz cited wanting more time with the Doctor as one of her reasons for travelling on the TARDIS, as well as saying that the Doctor was the best person she ever met. This spawned considerable fan-works, including memes and slash fiction, which expanded the ship's popularity in the fandom. The episode "The Haunting of Villa Diodati" features a scene in which a character worries if another will reciprocate her feelings, to which Yaz thinks of the Doctor and replies that she "know[s] someone like that." The New Year's special episode "Revolution of the Daleks" also teased the relationship further, with Yaz spending ten months in solitude inside of a TARDIS attempting to figure out a way to get the Doctor back. Jack Harkness also talks to Yaz about having a relationship with the Doctor in the episode. Prior to its use within the series, fans dubbed the pairing "Thasmin", a combination of "Thirteen" and "Yasmin".

=== Appearance and use within the series ===
The romance between the Thirteenth Doctor and Yaz was not originally planned. While attending fan convention Gallifrey One, executive producer Matt Strevens stated that the romance was not initially part of the series, and that he was initially unaware of Thasmin following lead actress Jodie Whittaker's first series as the Thirteenth Doctor, though Whittaker was aware and explained it to him. Khan's actress, Mandip Gill, was also aware of the ship, having seen fan art and fan fiction surrounding it. Strevens forgot about it while they were working on Doctor Who series 12 but later helped incorporate it into the subsequent series.

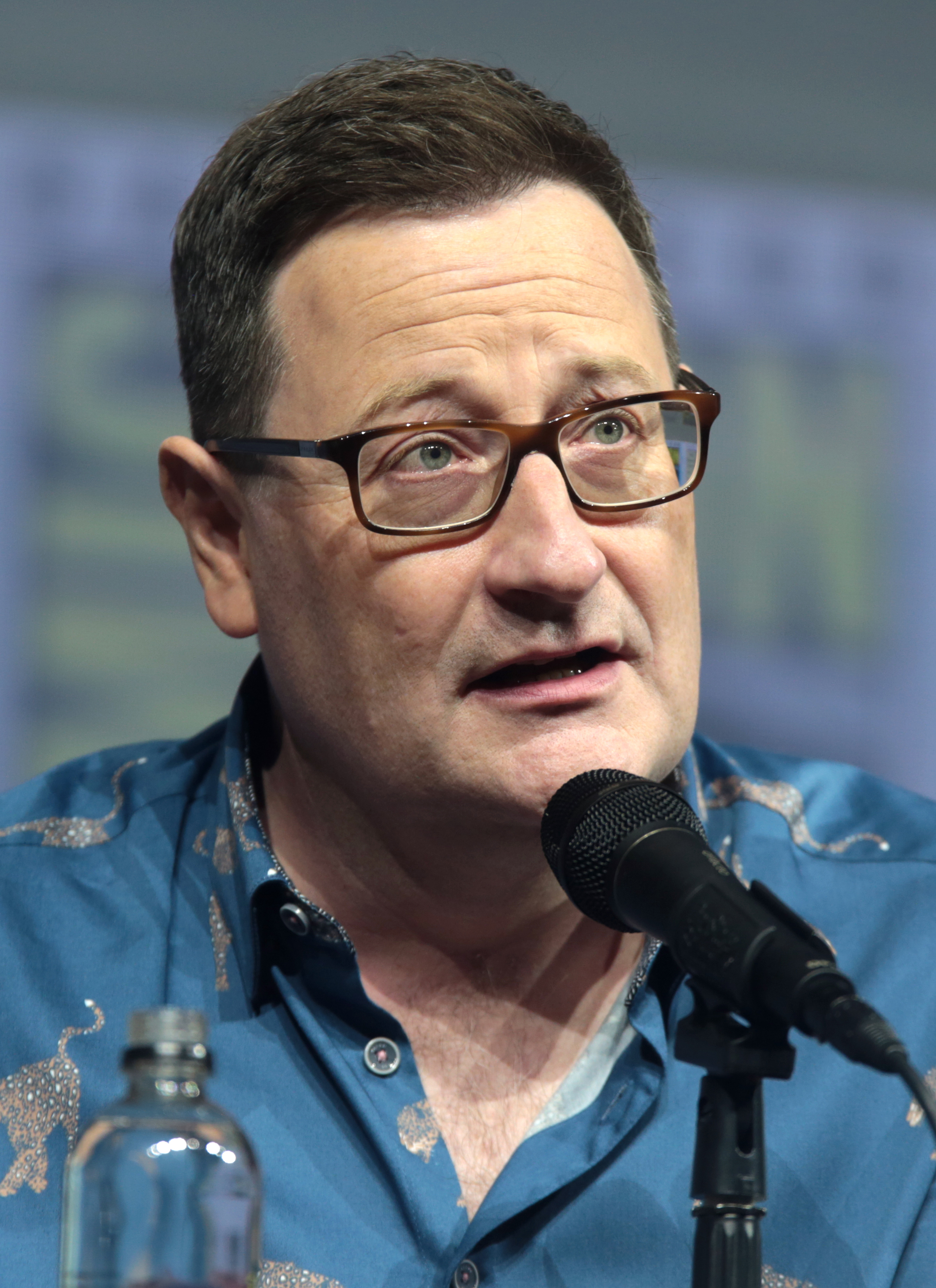
Chris Chibnall (pictured), then-showrunner, was enthusiastic about including Thasmin in the series after a suggestion by lead actress Jodie Whittaker

Whittaker approached showrunner Chris Chibnall about including the romance in the series and making it canon. Strevens stated that Chibnall wished to incorporate Thasmin into the plot of the series and "sort of play with it". According to Chibnall, the romance grew "organically out of the material", as well as out of Gill's performance. Chibnall went with a "slow-burn drip-feed approach", believing that it kept fans wanting more out of the relationship instead of less. Prior to the airing of Doctor Who series 13, Gill teased that fans of the ship would see more related to the ship as the series progressed, but did not give definite details on how it would end.

During series 13 of Doctor Who, also known as Doctor Who: Flux, Yaz is seen pining for the Doctor when they are separated, and holds a deep devotion to the Doctor during the series. Toward the end of the series, the pair nearly reveal their feelings for each other, as they share emotional moments together. In "Eve of the Daleks", companion Dan Lewis confronts the Doctor about her feelings for Yaz, while Yaz also admits her feelings for the Doctor to Dan in the same episode. Prior to the airing of "Legend of the Sea Devils", it was stated that more information on the Doctor and Yaz's romance would be included in the episode. In the episode, the Doctor quips about being a good date, but does not elaborate until later in the episode. The Doctor reveals that she reciprocates Yaz's feelings but doesn't want to go through with the relationship because "there's no point. Time always runs out." The Doctor asks to live in the present, which Yaz agrees to. In the following episode, "The Power of the Doctor", the Doctor is killed prematurely due to her enemy the Master. As the character begins to regenerate, the Doctor and Yaz go on one last trip, sitting on top of the TARDIS as they stare into space together. The Doctor declares she has loved being with Yaz, before bringing Yaz back home and going off on her own to regenerate.

Chibnall stated that he wanted the story to convey an "impossible romance", as he knew the audience would be aware of the fact that Whittaker and Gill were departing from the show soon, and that the Doctor's character would have to carry on without Yaz. Chris Chibnall stated on the WHO Corner to Corner podcast that the romance was an "unrequited love story" in that he believed the romance to be more heartbreaking for audiences if the pair did not kiss. He considered the final scene between the Doctor and Yaz on top of the TARDIS to be the equivalent of a kiss for their relationship. Despite standing by his decision, he believed that if he were writing the relationship again, he would have done it differently, considering it '50/50'. In 2026, Chibnall stated that the romance is "now sometimes spoken about as an unrequited love story. But it’s not unrequited; it’s unconsummated."

Neither Whittaker nor Gill regret how the ending of the relationship was handled, with Whittaker enjoying the final scene's shooting and ending. Following the announcement that audio dramas featuring the Thirteenth Doctor and Yaz would be produced, Whittaker teased that "we could be [kissing] in the background." The two would later end up engaging in a kiss in the 2026 audio drama The Violet Hour.

== Reception ==
Following the airing of "Eve of the Daleks", Strevens described Thasmin as being the main talking point that emerged from the episode, stating that it was widespread over social media. David Opie, writing for Digital Spy, praised the romance between the two, highlighting the positive representation that came from the relationship being center stage in the series' focus. Opie, however, criticized Dan's role in helping Yaz understand her feelings for the Doctor, believing that while the character had good intentions, it should not have been his place to try and influence it. Molly Moss, writing for Radio Times stated similarly, believing that while its execution in Flux was not well-done, its later expansion in subsequent episodes helped provide positive representation for LGBTQ+ audiences. In a prior article for Radio Times, Moss believed that while the relationship could be seen as "tokenistic" due to its late introduction, she highlighted the fact the series was even willing to go through with it at all, stating that it helped to avoid the ship becoming queerbaiting.

Adi Tantimedh, writing for Bleeding Cool, praised the relationship for the depth it gave to both Yaz and the Thirteenth Doctor's characters. Tantimedh stated that while it was criticized for failing as a lesbian romance, she saw it as helping to pioneer an asexual relationship on-screen in the form of the Thirteenth Doctor, citing the Doctor's lack of gender nonconformity and how the Doctor reciprocated Yaz's love in a non-sexual manner. Opie, writing in another article for Digital Spy, criticized the final scene between the two, believing that, despite the scene being the culmination of Whittaker's time on the show, the romance was not fully enacted upon. He stated that while he was aware that it was designed as a "doomed romance", he felt its inclusion in "The Power of the Doctor" and usage overall was a disservice to the LGBTQ+ fanbase, seeing it as a negative for representation overall. BJ Colangelo, writing for SlashFilm, decried the relationship as queerbaiting, finding that the way the romance was built up yet quickly sidelined was a disservice to LGBTQ+ fans who wanted to see a relationship that represented them on-screen.
