= Hotel Reverie =

- Black Mirror episode
- Promotional poster
- Episode no.: Series 7 Episode 3
- Directed by: Haolu Wang
- Written by: Charlie Brooker
- Cinematography by: Philipp Haberlandt
- Editing by: Matthew Tabern
- Original air date: 10 April 2025
- Running time: 78 minutes

Guest appearances
- Issa Rae as Brandy Friday; Emma Corrin as Dorothy Chambers; Harriet Walter as Judith Keyworth; Awkwafina as Kimmy

Episode chronology
← Previous "Bête Noire"	Next → "Plaything"

"Hotel Reverie" is the third episode in the seventh series of the British science fiction anthology television series Black Mirror. Written by series creator and showrunner Charlie Brooker and directed by Haolu Wang, it premiered on Netflix on 10 April 2025, with the rest of series seven.

The episode centres around actress Brandy Friday (Issa Rae) who stars in a remake of a 1940s romance film by acting in a simulation alongside artificial intelligence (AI) versions of the characters through an immersive AI-based virtual production. "Hotel Reverie" received generally positive reviews, with praise directed towards Rae's performance and the visuals, as well as the more bittersweet tone compared to previous Black Mirror episodes.

== Plot ==
In the present, A-list actor Brandy Friday is invited by entertainment technology company ReDream to star in a high-tech remake of a Keyworth Pictures classic, the 1940s romance film Hotel Reverie. She only takes the role on the condition that she will play a gender-swapped version of Dr. Alex Palmer, the main male love interest. When Brandy arrives at the studio, she learns that instead of being produced like a traditional film, her consciousness will instead be transferred into the world of the film itself using an immersive AI-based virtual production technology.

In this virtual world, she interacts with digital replicas of the film's original characters, and the story will be filmed and captured live like a play. As the producers running the simulation guide her through the script by speaking to her in real time, Brandy realizes her character is supposed to play piano, which she is unable to do. In the original film, Dr. Palmer's love interest, Clara, is so moved by the music that she goes outside with Dr. Palmer. Because of Brandy's poor piano skills, Clara does not go outside, setting off a chain reaction that diverges the story in the simulation from the movie's original script.

Brandy scrambles to fix this, inadvertently causing Clara's AI to gain more agency and subsequently gain consciousness. When she accidentally calls Clara's character by her actor's name, Dorothy Chambers, Clara begins to gain memories from Dorothy's real life that had been fed to the AI. An employee spills coffee on one of the computers running the simulation, causing everyone in the virtual world except Brandy and Clara to freeze. The audio and video feed is cut off, so Brandy and the producers cannot communicate with each other. Because of this error, Brandy becomes trapped in the simulation and cannot leave until she cues the credits to roll by saying the final line of the film, thus completing the story.

Brandy explains to Clara that she is an artificial construct in a simulated world, causing Clara to try to escape the simulation. When Clara passes through the edge of the artificial reality, she becomes imbued with Dorothy's memories. Clara learns that Dorothy Chambers was a deeply troubled movie star and possibly a lesbian, who died after overdosing on barbiturates. Clara returns to the simulation, and she and Brandy kiss. The two continue to live in the still-frozen virtual world for several months, eventually confessing their love for one another. Brandy asks Clara if her love is real or if she is merely programmed to feel that way because of how her character was written; Clara is at a loss for words.

In the real world, less than an hour has elapsed when the producers manage to get the computers running again and reset the simulation back to the moment before the error occurred, erasing all of Clara's memories after that point. Although Brandy is devastated, she decides to continue with the movie as scripted until the ending scene. As Clara's villainous husband Claude tries to kill Brandy, instead of the police rushing in, Clara shoots her husband and saves Brandy. The police shoot Clara, who dies in Brandy's arms. Heartbroken, Brandy tearfully cradles Clara's body while saying the final line and ending the film, allowing her to leave the simulation.

Months later, Hotel Reverie Reborn premieres on Streamberry. A depressed Brandy returns home, still grieving the lost months she spent with Clara in the simulation. Back in her home, she receives a gift from Kimmy, the producer, and opens it to find a telephone that allows her to communicate with Clara's simulated consciousness, who tells Brandy that she has "all the time in the world".

== Production ==
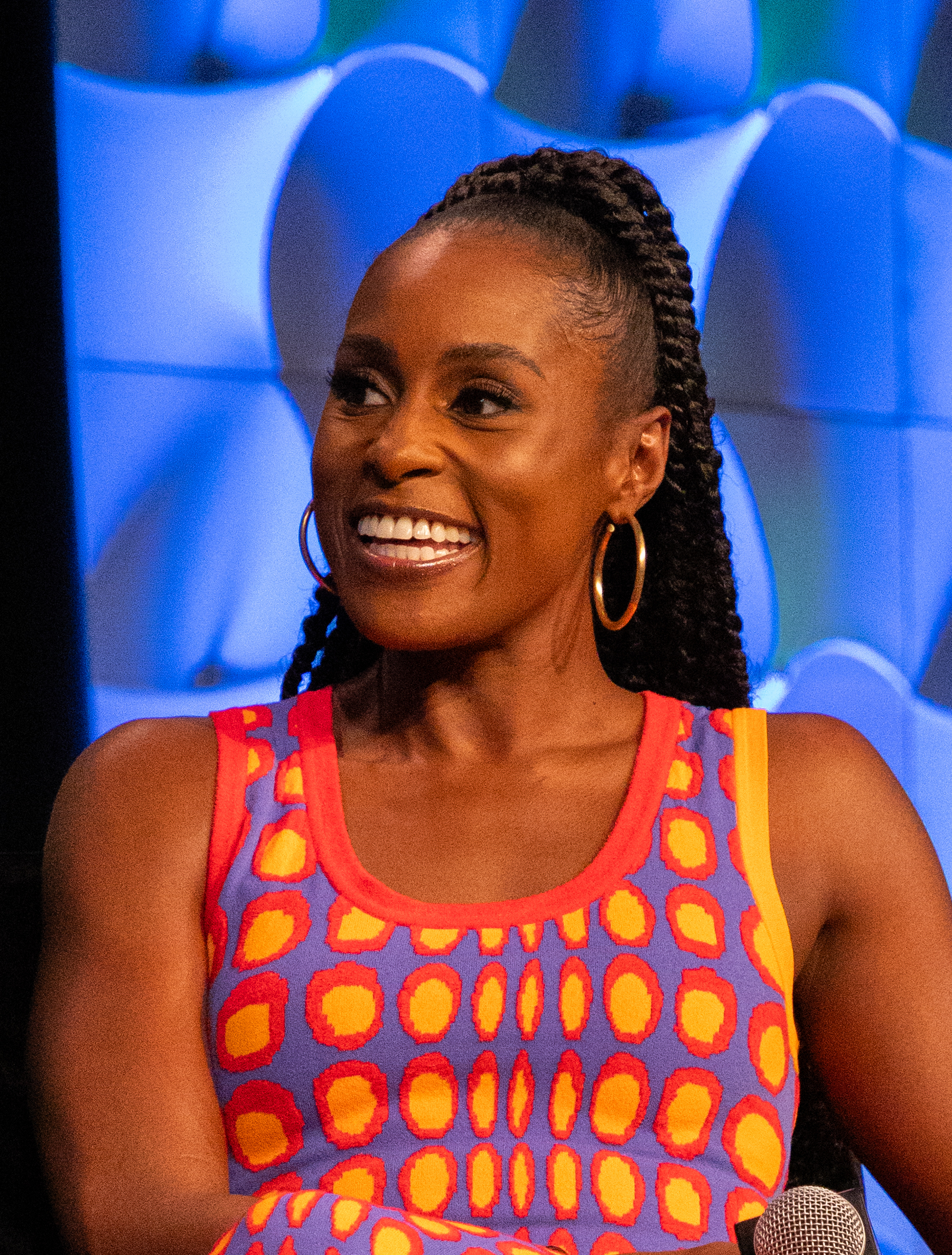
Issa Rae

Brooker originally conceived the story as a horror episode about someone who was able to communicate with old film footage. He had a separate idea for a story about someone with poor physical fitness who was forced to play James Bond in a technological film adaptation. He decided to combine the two ideas and make it into a romance after viewing the 1945 romantic film Brief Encounter.

One scene set in the real world between Brandy and her agent briefly shows the 2024 video game Balatro being played. Brooker had previously expressed his addiction to the game and cautioned that it would lead to a major loss of productivity once it was released on mobile platforms.

== Reception ==
Critics praised the visuals of the episode and the performances of Rae and Corrin. Collider called the episode the worst of season 7. Meanwhile, Louisa Mellor of Den of Geek rated the episode a perfect 5 out of 5 stars.

=== Episode rankings ===
"Hotel Reverie" ranked below average on critics' lists of the 34 instalments of Black Mirror, from best to worst:

- 16th – Jackie Strause and James Hibberd, The Hollywood Reporter
- 19th – Lucy Ford, Jack King and Brit Dawson, GQ
- 19th – Charles Bramesco, Vulture
- 26th – James Hibbs, Radio Times
- 26th – James Hibberd, Christian Holub, and Randall Colburn, Entertainment Weekly
- 31st – Ed Power, The Daily Telegraph

IndieWire listed the 33 episodes, excluding Bandersnatch, where "Hotel Reverie" placed 10th. Wired rated it sixth-best of the six episodes in series seven. Instead of by quality, Mashable ranked the episodes by tone, concluding that "Hotel Reverie" was the third-least pessimistic episode of the show.
