= Haolu Wang =

Chinese director

- 王昊鹭
- Born: Xuzhou, Jiangsu, China
- Education: Colby College; National Film and Television School
- Occupations: Film and television director; Screenwriter

Haolu Wang (Chinese: 王昊鹭; pinyin: Wáng Hàolù) is a Chinese director and screenwriter. She has created several short films and one feature film, and directed episodes for television shows including Black Mirror and Doctor Who.

== Early life and education ==
Wang was born in Xuzhou, Jiangsu. She learned English as a child by watching television and buying pirated DVDs on the weekends, including Léon: The Professional and the Three Colours trilogy. She later attended Fudan University in Shanghai.

In 2006 she enrolled at Colby College in Maine, graduating in 2010 with degrees in government and economics. Her first job after graduation was at an investment firm in Hong Kong, during which she bought DVDs on her lunch breaks to watch after work. Disliking the financial world, she was inspired to quit her banking job of two years to become a filmmaker after watching Ingmar Bergman's Persona (1966). She attended the film program at Prague Film School, where Jiří Menzel became her mentor, and the program at London Film School.

Flip Flops (2015) was Wang's first short film, shot in Hong Kong with a crew of locals and students from Hong Kong Baptist University. It became her submission for admission into a master's degree at the National Film and Television School (NFTS) in Beaconsfield, England. In 2017, Wang received a BAFTA scholarship towards her degree at NFTS, graduating with a Master of Fine Arts degree in Directing Fiction in 2019.

== Film and television career ==
Wang worked on the script for My Best Friend's Wedding, a 2016 romantic comedy starring Shu Qi.

The short film The Pregnant Ground was Wang's graduation project at NFTS. Shot in London and Beaconsfield, it starred Huang Lu as a woman who, following her miscarriage, believes the rising ground underneath her apartment is going to give birth. The short film premiered at the 2019 Palm Springs International ShortFest.

Her first feature film was A Dutiful Wife, a psychological thriller about a woman attempting to cover up her husband's disappearance. It received the ArteKino International Award at the 50th International Film Festival Rotterdam in 2021.

Following the release of Doctor Who's thirteenth series, Wang directed the second of three 2022 specials, "Legend of the Sea Devils". The next year, she co-directed the Netflix show Bodies with Marco Kreuzpaintner, directing the second half of the miniseries. For Bodies, Wang was nominated for the Best Emerging Talent in Fiction award at the 2024 British Academy Television Craft Awards.

In 2025, she directed "Hotel Reverie", an episode in the seventh series of Black Mirror, starring Issa Rae and Emma Corrin. She was nominated for a NAACP Image Award for her work on the episode. Wang, whose episode dealt with the use of artificial intelligence in film production, said she hoped that "people will realise AI is terrible for creativity", and that she was against "the cruelty of AI in reducing people, humanity and actors to just data points".

== Filmography ==
=== Film ===
Year	Title	Notes
2013	Labyrinth of a Dream	Short film
2014	Being James	Short film
2015	Flip Flops	Short film
2016	Emma	Short film
2017	The Blender	Short film
2018	Lao Wai	Short film
2019	The Pregnant Ground	Short film
2021	A Dutiful Wife	

=== Television ===
Year	Title	Episode(s)
2022	Doctor Who	Episode: "Legend of the Sea Devils"
2023	Bodies	Episodes 5–8
2025	Black Mirror	Episode: "Hotel Reverie"
