= Legend of the Sea Devils =

299 – "Legend of the Sea Devils"
- Doctor Who episode
- Promotional poster

Cast
- Doctor: Jodie Whittaker – Thirteenth Doctor
- Companions: Mandip Gill – Yasmin Khan; John Bishop – Dan Lewis
- Others: Marlowe Chan-Reeves – Ying Ki; Crystal Yu – Madam Ching; Craige Els – Chief Sea Devil; Arthur Lee – Ji-Hun; David K. S. Tse – Ying Wai; Jon Davey, Simon Carew, Chester Durrant, Richard Price, Mickey Lewis, Andrew Cross – Sea Devils; Nadia Albina – Diane (uncredited)

Production
- Directed by: Haolu Wang
- Written by: Ella Road and Chris Chibnall
- Produced by: Nikki Wilson
- Executive producers: Chris Chibnall; Matt Strevens; Nikki Wilson
- Music by: Segun Akinola
- Series: 2022 specials
- Running time: 48 minutes
- First broadcast: 17 April 2022

Chronology
← Preceded by "Eve of the Daleks"	Followed by → "The Power of the Doctor"

"Legend of the Sea Devils" is the second and penultimate of three special episodes that followed the thirteenth series of the British science fiction television programme Doctor Who. The episode was first broadcast on 17 April 2022 as an Easter Sunday special. It was written by Ella Road and Chris Chibnall and directed by Haolu Wang.

In the episode, the Thirteenth Doctor (Jodie Whittaker) and her two companions, Yasmin Khan (Mandip Gill) and Dan Lewis (John Bishop), set out to find the hidden treasure of the Flor de la Mar. However, they end up in the wrong time period and team up with Madam Ching (guest star Crystal Yu) as they battle the Sea Devils for an important gem.

"Legend of the Sea Devils" was filmed in Wales across July 2021 and was impacted by COVID-19 in its production process. The episode received mixed reviews from critics. The special was also broadcast internationally.

== Plot ==
In 1807 China, the pirate Madam Ching raids a village and, using a gem, unwittingly releases the Sea Devil Marsissus from a stone statue. Marsissus kills Ying Wai, the young Ying Ki's father, who was tasked with keeping Marsissus contained. The Doctor, Yaz, and Dan arrive to confront Marsissus and investigate the village. Ying Ki and Dan take the gem, split off, and swim to Ching's ship to take revenge. Ching reveals she is after the treasure of the legendary sailor Ji-Hun (who disappeared while searching for the Flor de la Mar treasure) because she needs it to pay the ransom for her kidnapped crew. The Sea Devils unleash a leviathan, the Huasen, on Ching's ship.

The Doctor and Yaz take the TARDIS back 274 years and witness a Sea Devil betraying Ji-Hun aboard the latter's ship. Upon returning to 1807, they try to find the shipwreck to no avail. The Huasen takes the TARDIS to the Sea Devils' undersea lair. The Sea Devils seek the gem, the Keystone, to execute their plan. Pretending they have it, the Doctor and Yaz use it as leverage to board Ji-Hun's ship, which has been retrofitted with alien technology. They are shown Ji-Hun, who has been kept in stasis. He reveals he tricked the Sea Devils in their deal. Marsissus calls the Doctor's bluff, claiming the Huasen has located the Keystone.

Ji-Hun, the Doctor, and Yaz board Ching's ship. Ji-Hun finds out Ying Ki is the descendant of his most trusted crew member Lei Bao and reveals he gave the Keystone to Lei, who escaped his ship. Marsissus seizes the Keystone from Ying Ki just as the Doctor realises the Sea Devils plan to use it to flood Earth.

The protagonists fight the Sea Devils aboard Ching's ship. The Doctor tampers with the technology on Ji-Hun's ship, but destroying it requires two cables to be held together. The Doctor volunteers to stay back while the others escape, but Ji-Hun offers to sacrifice himself instead.

Madam Ching announces she has recovered enough treasure to pay the ransom and will make Ying Ki a member of her crew. The Doctor takes Yaz and Dan ashore. Dan leaves a message for his love interest Diane and is surprised when she calls him back. The Doctor, who had acknowledged Yaz's feelings for her on Ji-Hun's ship, solemnly expresses her wish that she could spend more time with Yaz.

== Production ==
=== Development ===
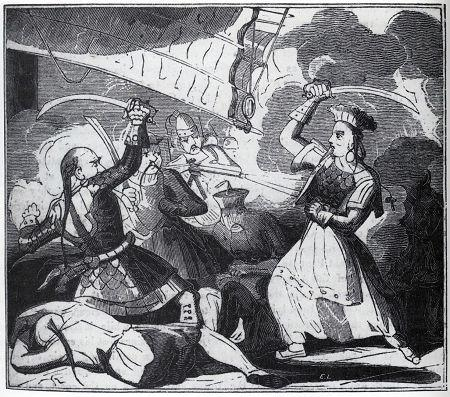
Zheng Yi Sao depicted in an 1836 illustration

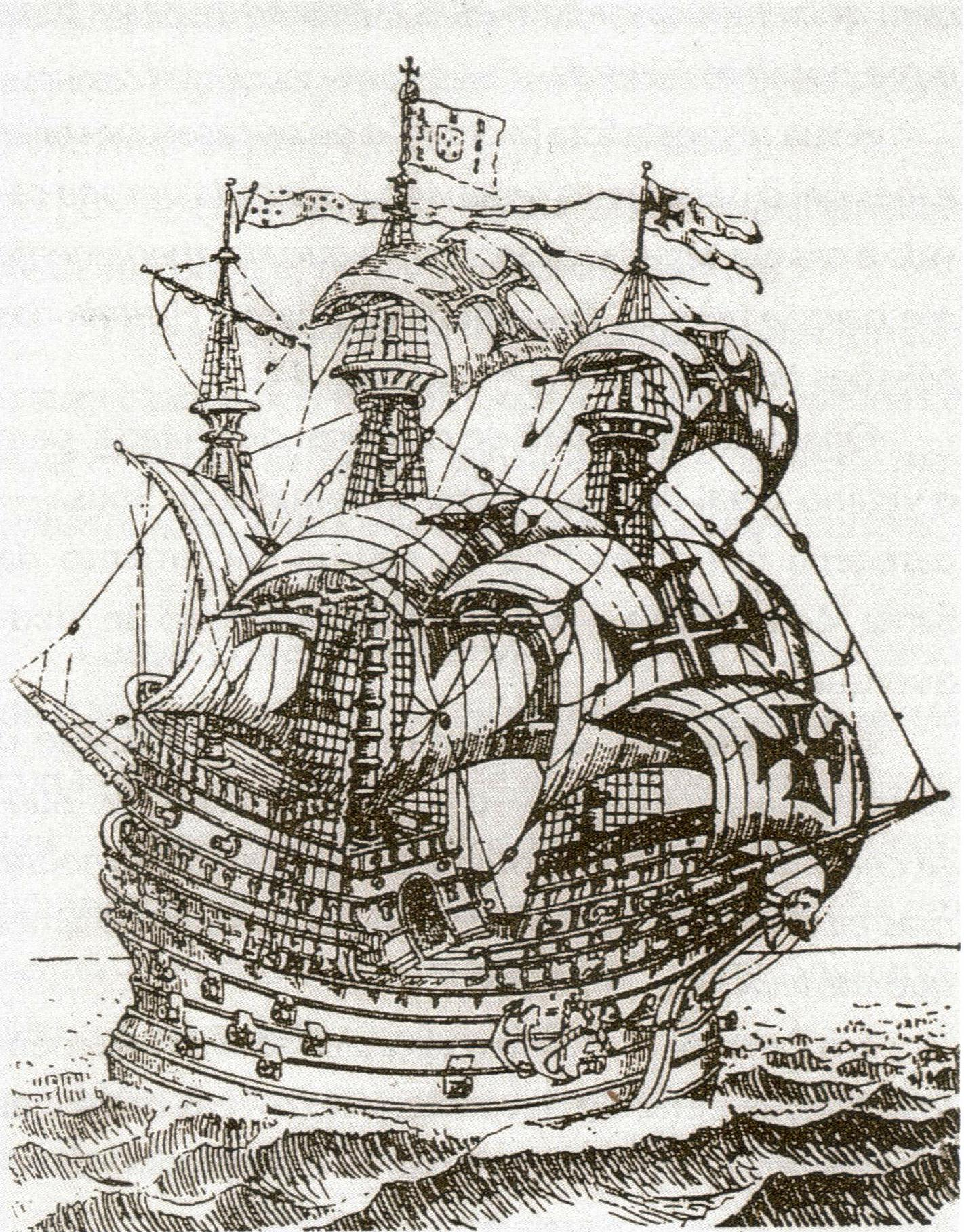
Flor de la Mar depicted in a 16th century illustration

"Legend of the Sea Devils" was the final episode produced as part of the eight episodes ordered for the thirteenth series of Doctor Who. Despite this, it stands alone from the six-part series. Along with the previous episode and the following episode, which was ordered later, it is the second and penultimate episode in a trio of specials. The episode was co-written by first-time writer for the programme, Ella Road, along with the showrunner, Chris Chibnall. Road wrote the episode with Chibnall at his house in Wales over the course of three days. Road stated that she initially expected Chibnall to have an idea for the story drafted when she was hired, but this was not the case. Script editors Becky Roughan and Caroline Buckley also participated in brainstorming sessions. The Sea Devils make their return in the episode for the first time since the 1984 serial Warriors of the Deep. It is their third major televised appearance, following their introduction in The Sea Devils in 1972.

Chibnall revealed that he did not always have intentions to bring the Sea Devils back to Doctor Who. One of Road's contributions was the addition of the historical figure Zheng Yi Sao, also known as Madam Ching, to the special. Also depicted is the Flor de la Mar, a sailing ship that sunk off the coast of Indonesia with stolen goods that were never recovered. Chibnall wanted to use these elements after a pirate-themed story had been planned for the thirteenth series but did not come to fruition. The episode also continued to explore the same-sex romance between the Doctor and her companion Yasmin Khan. Road said that she and the producers insisted on handling the situation "delicately", but that they recognized the story needed to be told. She further explained this aspect of her writing in an edition of Doctor Who Magazine, "I think it's good to be able to include these real relationship questions that people can relate to, outside the whole sci-fi aspect of the show. The question of whether or not to enjoy a relationship for what it is now, versus worrying about the future – that's a very universal thing." As part of the promotion for the episode, Scottish musician Nathan Evans released a Doctor Who-themed adaptation of the sea ballad "Wellerman".

=== Casting ===
Jodie Whittaker starred in the episode as the thirteenth incarnation of the Doctor. Mandip Gill and John Bishop portrayed the Doctor's companions, Yasmin Khan and Dan Lewis, respectively. Crystal Yu was cast to play Madame Ching while Arthur Lee and Marlowe Chan-Reeves guest starred as Ji-Hun and Ying Ki. David K. S. Tse appeared as Ying Wai. Craige Els, who portrayed Karvanista in series thirteen, played Marsissus, the chief Sea Devil, while Simon Carew, Andrew Cross, Jon Davey, Chester Durrant, Mickey Lewis and Richard Price were additional Sea Devils. Nadia Albina made an uncredited appearance as Dan's love interest Diane.

=== Filming ===
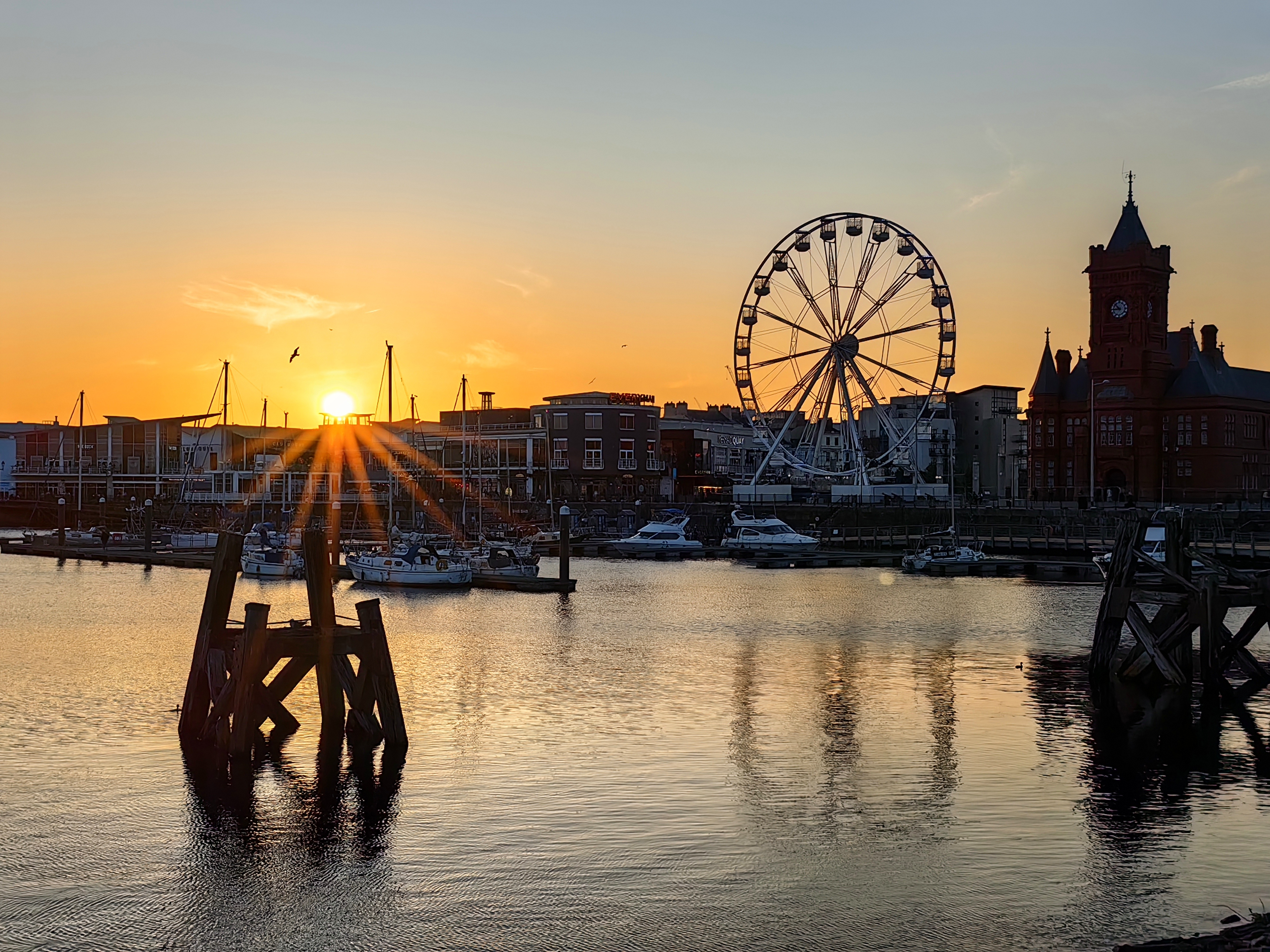
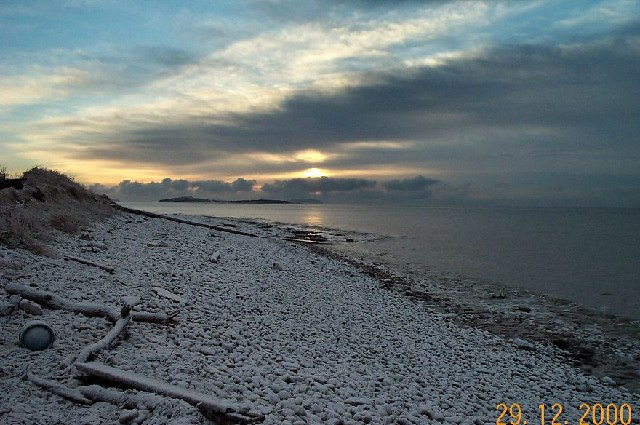
Scenes for the episode were filmed at Cardiff Bay (left) and Sully Beach (right).

"Legend of the Sea Devils" was directed by Haolu Wang. Known previously for her work on short films, the episode is Wang's television directorial debut. Portions of the episode were filmed on location at Sully Beach and Cardiff Bay standing in for locations in South China. Filming was impacted by the COVID-19 pandemic. Mark Waters was the episode's Director of Photography. The primary pirate ship set was built on a sound stage. Although Whittaker had a stunt double on set, she preferred to perform some of the stunts herself. Whittaker said that it was her first time doing any stage combat since her time at drama school. Yu's background as a dancer also allowed her to excel in the sword fighting scene. Principal photography wrapped on 25 July 2021. Executive producer Matt Strevens confirmed that the special was in picture lock by February 2022.

The updated designs for the Sea Devils were created by costumers Ray Holman and Maker Robert Allsop. The Sea Devils were made shorter than they were in previous episodes to compensate for the height difference between Whittaker and Third Doctor portrayer Jon Pertwee. In their original appearance, the Sea Devils wore outfits made of silver fish netting. The new look included revised outfits for the Sea Devils; however, Holman "included some nods to the original look, weaving netting through the costumes" and their armour. When creating the head pieces, Allsop took measurements from a cast that was created for the Sea Devils in the 1980s. He also used photos from their previous appearances. The newer masks enabled the Sea Devils to have "more realistic expression".

== Release and reception ==
Professional ratings
Aggregate scores
Source	Rating
Rotten Tomatoes (Tomatometer)	50%
Rotten Tomatoes (Average Score)	4.90/10
Metacritic	51/100
Review scores
Source	Rating
i	1/5 stars
Radio Times	3/5 stars
The Independent	3/5 stars
Evening Standard	3/5 stars
The Guardian	3/5 stars

=== Broadcast and home media ===
When planning Doctor Who's thirteenth series, two specials were set to be held for 2022. It was later reported that "Legend of the Sea Devils" would air on BBC One on 17 April as an Easter Sunday special. The episode was simulcast on BBC America in the United States, with an additional broadcast later that same day. It also aired on ABC TV Plus in Australia on 18 April.

"Eve of the Daleks" and "Legend of the Sea Devils" received a joint DVD and Blu-ray release in Region 2/B on 23 May 2022, in Region 1/A on 28 June 2022, and in Region 4/B on 13 July 2022. The episode was included in the home media set for the 2022 specials, released in Region 2/B on 7 November 2022.

On 18 November 2022, composer Segun Akinola announced that selected pieces of the score from this special would be digitally released on 9 December 2022. A physical CD release containing all three soundtracks of the 2022 specials was released on 13 January 2023.

=== Ratings ===
The episode was watched by 2.20 million viewers overnight, becoming the eleventh most-watched programme of the day. The final consolidated ratings for the episode were 3.47 million viewers. It was the twenty-fifth most watched programme of the week. In the United States, the simulcast was seen by 283,000 viewers, while the later broadcast was viewed by 209,000 viewers.

=== Critical response ===
On the review aggregator website Rotten Tomatoes, 50% of 8 critics' reviews are positive, with an average rating of 4.90/10. Metacritic, which uses a weighted average, assigned the film a score of 51 out of 100, based on 6 critics, indicating "mixed or average" reviews. Benji Wilson, writing in The Daily Telegraph, said that his kids thought the Sea Devils were "cute", which undermined the perceived scariness of the episode. However, he praised the "nascent queer relationship between the Doctor and Yaz", commenting that the interplay between the two characters was "genuinely affecting".

Awarding it three stars out of five, Martin Belam of The Guardian said the episode "promised a swashbuckling Easter special, and it partially delivered", but he felt that the scenes between the Doctor and Yaz towards the end "didn't necessarily ring true". The i's Stephen Kelly gave the episode one star, criticizing a thinly written supporting cast and "a frenzied plot", but opined that the Doctor and Yaz's affection was one of the only redeeming qualities of the episode.
