= The Power of the Doctor =

300 – "The Power of the Doctor"
- Doctor Who episode
- Promotional poster

Cast
- Doctor: Jodie Whittaker – Thirteenth Doctor
- Companions: Mandip Gill – Yasmin Khan; John Bishop – Dan Lewis; Sophie Aldred – Ace; Janet Fielding – Tegan Jovanka
- Others: David Bradley – First Doctor; Colin Baker – Sixth Doctor; Peter Davison – Fifth Doctor; Paul McGann – Eighth Doctor; Sylvester McCoy – Seventh Doctor; Jo Martin – Fugitive Doctor; David Tennant – Fourteenth Doctor; Sacha Dhawan – The Master; Jemma Redgrave – Kate Stewart; Jacob Anderson – Vinder; Bradley Walsh – Graham O'Brien; Patrick O'Kane – Ashad; Joe Sims – Deputy Marshal Arnhost; Sanchia McCormack – Train Marshal Halaz; Danielle Bjelic – Curator; Anna Andresen – Alexandra; Richard Dempsey – Nicholas; Jos Slovick – Messenger; Nicholas Briggs – Voice of the Daleks & Cybermen; Barnaby Edwards, Nicholas Pegg – Dalek Operators; Simon Carew, Jon Davey, Chester Durrant, Mickey Lewis, Felix Young, Richard Price, Andrew Cross, Matt Doman – Cybermen; Bonnie Langford – Melanie Bush; Katy Manning – Jo Jones; William Russell – Ian Chesterton

Production
- Directed by: Jamie Magnus Stone (Note: Rachel Talalay directed the final scene.)
- Written by: Chris Chibnall (Note: Russell T Davies wrote the Fourteenth Doctor's monologue at the end of the episode, to which David Tennant improvised a line.)
- Produced by: Nikki Wilson
- Executive producers: Chris Chibnall; Matt Strevens; Nikki Wilson
- Music by: Segun Akinola
- Series: 2022 specials
- Running time: 87 minutes
- First broadcast: 23 October 2022

Chronology
← Preceded by "Legend of the Sea Devils"	Followed by → "The Star Beast"

"The Power of the Doctor" is the third and final story of three special episodes that follow the thirteenth series of the British science fiction television programme Doctor Who. The episode was written by Chris Chibnall and directed by Jamie Magnus Stone. It was first broadcast on BBC One on 23 October 2022. The special was commissioned to air during the BBC's centenary celebrations.

Jodie Whittaker makes her final regular appearance as the thirteenth incarnation of the Doctor. Mandip Gill and John Bishop, who portray the Doctor's companions, Yasmin Khan and Dan Lewis, also depart. Janet Fielding and Sophie Aldred respectively star as Tegan Jovanka and Ace, former companions of the Doctor. It is the final episode in Chibnall's era as showrunner with a new cast, crew, and production company leading future episodes.

In the episode, a recurring enemy of the Doctor known as the Master (guest star Sacha Dhawan) teams up with the Cybermen and the Daleks, other recurring adversaries of the Doctor, in a plot to destroy humanity. The episode sees a number of previous series regulars and recurring cast members make guest appearances. Among these are former Doctor portrayers David Bradley, Colin Baker, Peter Davison, Sylvester McCoy, Paul McGann, and Jo Martin and former companion actors Bradley Walsh, Bonnie Langford, Katy Manning, and William Russell. Jemma Redgrave, Jacob Anderson, and Patrick O'Kane also appear in central roles. David Tennant makes an appearance at the end of the episode as the Fourteenth Doctor.

"The Power of the Doctor" was filmed in Cardiff in September and October 2021. Post-production work continued into early 2022, with Tennant's appearance filmed in May 2022. It is one of the longest episodes of Doctor Who to be produced and the 300th overall story. The episode was seen by 5.30 million viewers and received mostly positive reviews. It was also broadcast internationally.

== Plot ==
The Thirteenth Doctor and her companions intervene in a CyberMaster attack on a bullet train, but are unable to stop them from escaping with a child. After nearly being killed, Dan parts with the Doctor and returns to his own life. A rogue Dalek contacts the Doctor, offering information about a plot to destroy humanity.

The Doctor tracks the child to a second moon that has appeared in the sky over 1916 Russia. The Doctor and Yaz find the child from the train imprisoned on the planet, and discover it is actually an enslaved energy being. The Doctor's former companions Tegan and Ace investigate the abduction of seismologists and the addition of Rasputin's face to famous paintings. Kate Stewart invites the Doctor to UNIT's headquarters to discuss their findings. The Doctor clarifies that the new face in the paintings is actually that of the Master.

The Doctor confronts the Master in Naples, where he reveals he has killed the missing seismologists. The Doctor learns the Master and his CyberMasters have allied with the Daleks to trigger simultaneous volcanic eruptions across Earth. The Doctor meets the rogue Dalek but she is captured. Meanwhile, the Doctor's former ally Vinder crash-lands on the Cyber planet. Under arrest at UNIT headquarters, the Master uses a miniaturised Cyberman as a Russian doll, bringing in a large number of Cybermen which free him. The Daleks take the Doctor to the Master in 1916 Russia where he forces her to regenerate into himself.

The Doctor encounters mental manifestations of some of her past incarnations, who inform her it may be possible to undo the forced regeneration. An AI program the Doctor created, using images of the past Doctors, leads Ace to meet with former companion Graham and destroy the Dalek volcano machine, Tegan to destroy the Cyberman converter and CyberMasters in UNIT HQ, and Yaz and Vinder to trick and capture the Master with a hologram of the Fugitive Doctor. They also cause the CyberMasters to regenerate, harnessing the energy to undo the Doctor's forced regeneration.

Defeated, the Master mortally wounds the Doctor, triggering her regeneration. After sharing a final adventure with her, the Doctor takes Yaz home and departs alone. Yaz attends a support group of former companions, while the Doctor travels to a cliff where she regenerates into the Fourteenth Doctor, who is alarmed to discover his new appearance is physically similar to his tenth incarnation.

== Production ==
=== Development ===
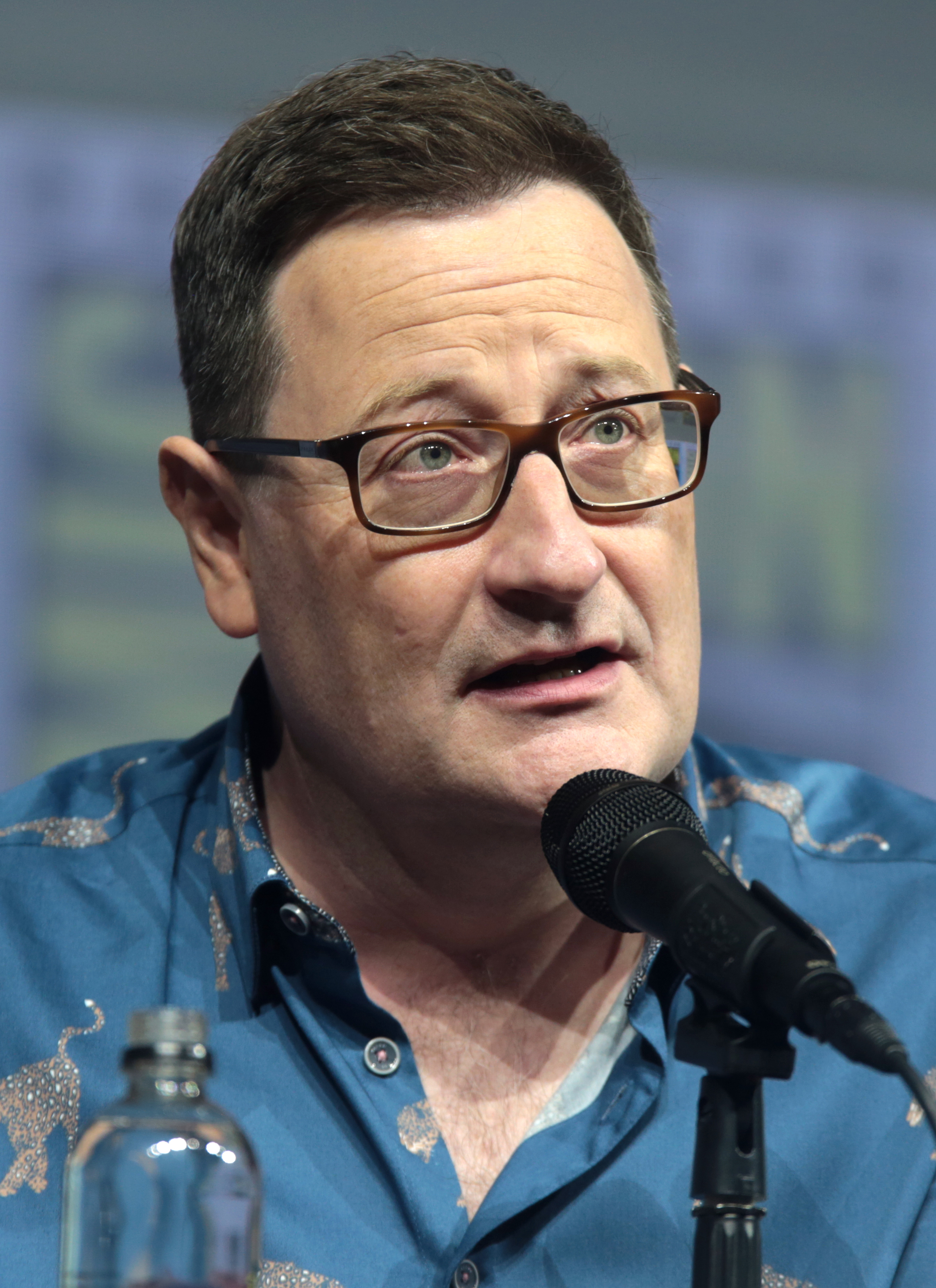
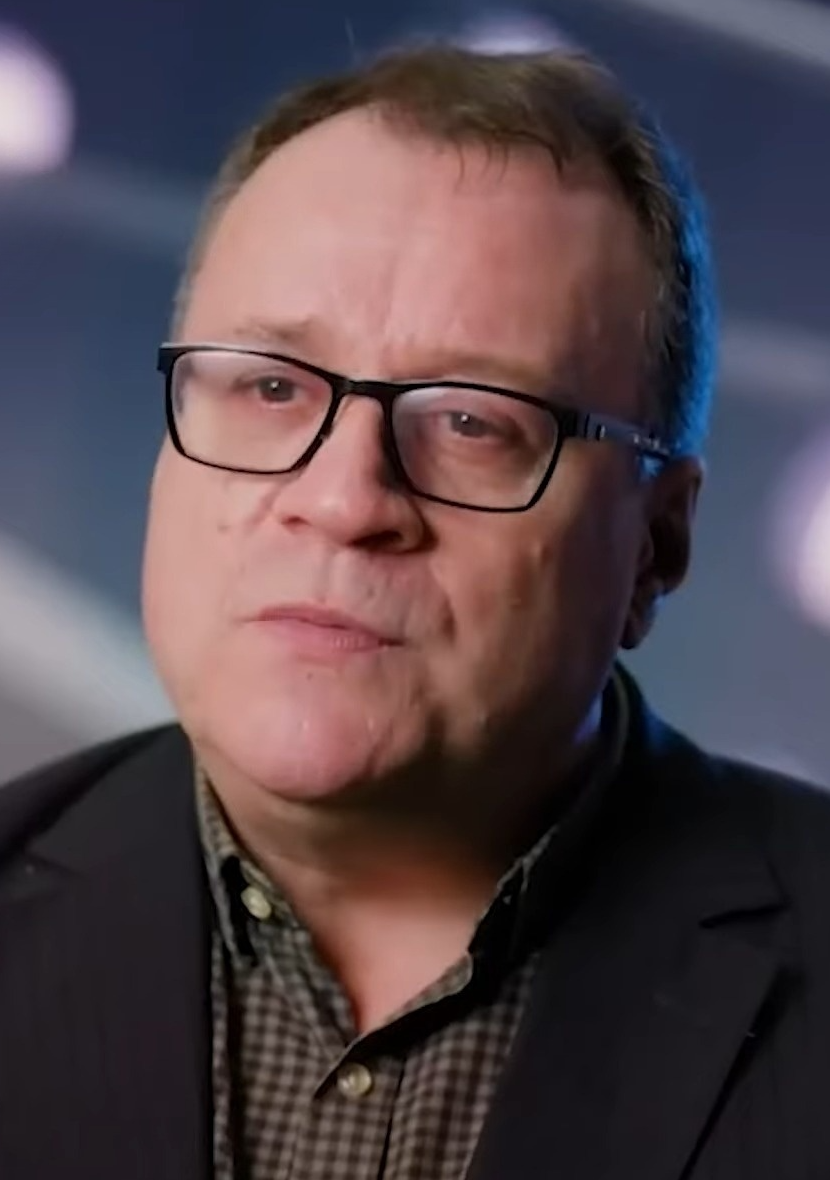
Outgoing showrunner Chris Chibnall (left) wrote the majority of the episode while its final moments were written by incoming showrunner Russell T Davies (right).

In 2021 Charlotte Moore, Chief Content Officer for the BBC, commissioned a single episode of Doctor Who to celebrate the BBC's centenary that would also be a regeneration episode. The BBC described this feature-length episode as an "epic blockbuster special". It is the final story in a trio of specials that also comprised the seventh and eighth episodes commissioned for the thirteenth series. Despite this, the three episodes stand alone from the six-part serial. The episode was written by showrunner and executive producer Chris Chibnall, who announced his intentions to leave the programme following the episode. It also saw the departures of executive producer Matt Strevens as well as Nikki Wilson, a co-executive producer. The special is the 300th overall Doctor Who story since the first story was broadcast in 1963.

The Cybermen, the Daleks, and the Master all return in the special; it is the first time that all three hold significant roles in the same episode. Chibnall stated that he had plans to include the Master in the next regeneration story since the twelfth series. When asked for suggestions by Chibnall, Sacha Dhawan, who portrayed the Master, said he wanted to explore the theme of the Master's disguises, which was used as a major plot thread of the episode. One of the Master's costumes included a cumulation of outfit pieces from several Doctors. Chibnall said he had the Thirteenth Doctor's final lines written for some time. "The Power of the Doctor" was revealed to be the episode's title in September 2022.

Chibnall's original script ends mid-regeneration with a "to be continued" message. The incoming and returning showrunner, Russell T Davies, penned the episode's final moments, continuing a trend he had started. David Tennant, who previously portrayed the Tenth Doctor and returned to star as the Fourteenth Doctor, also contributed by improvising a line. A major facet of this portion of the episode included the Doctor's clothes regenerating with them, something that is unusual for the show. Davies explained this by saying that having a heterosexual man appear in woman's clothing "can look like mockery", especially when the physical differences between Tennant and his predecessor were taken into account. He further stated that if the previous outfit had been retained for the scene, the media would continuously focus on the moment and worried that it would become "weaponised".

=== Casting ===
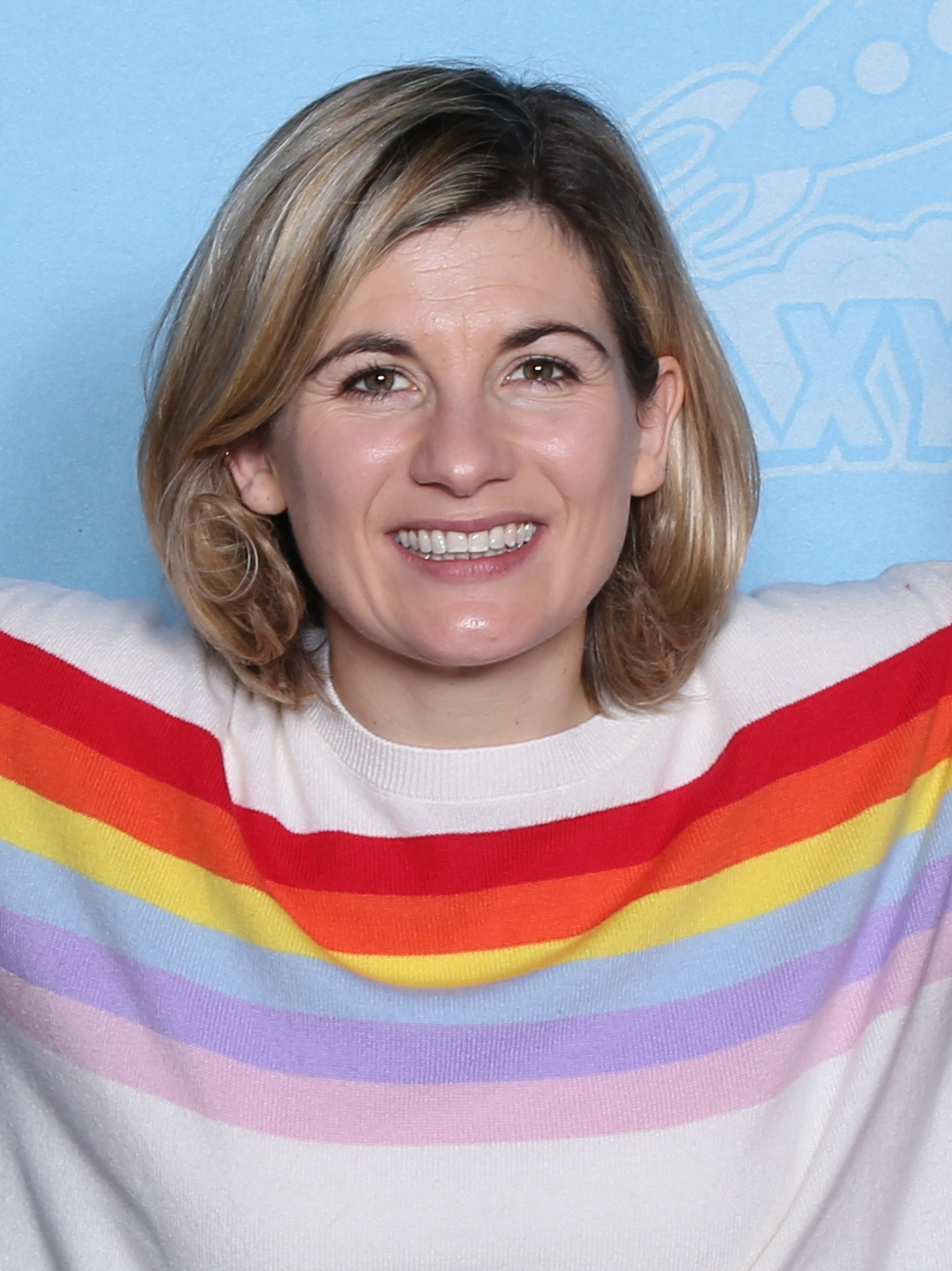
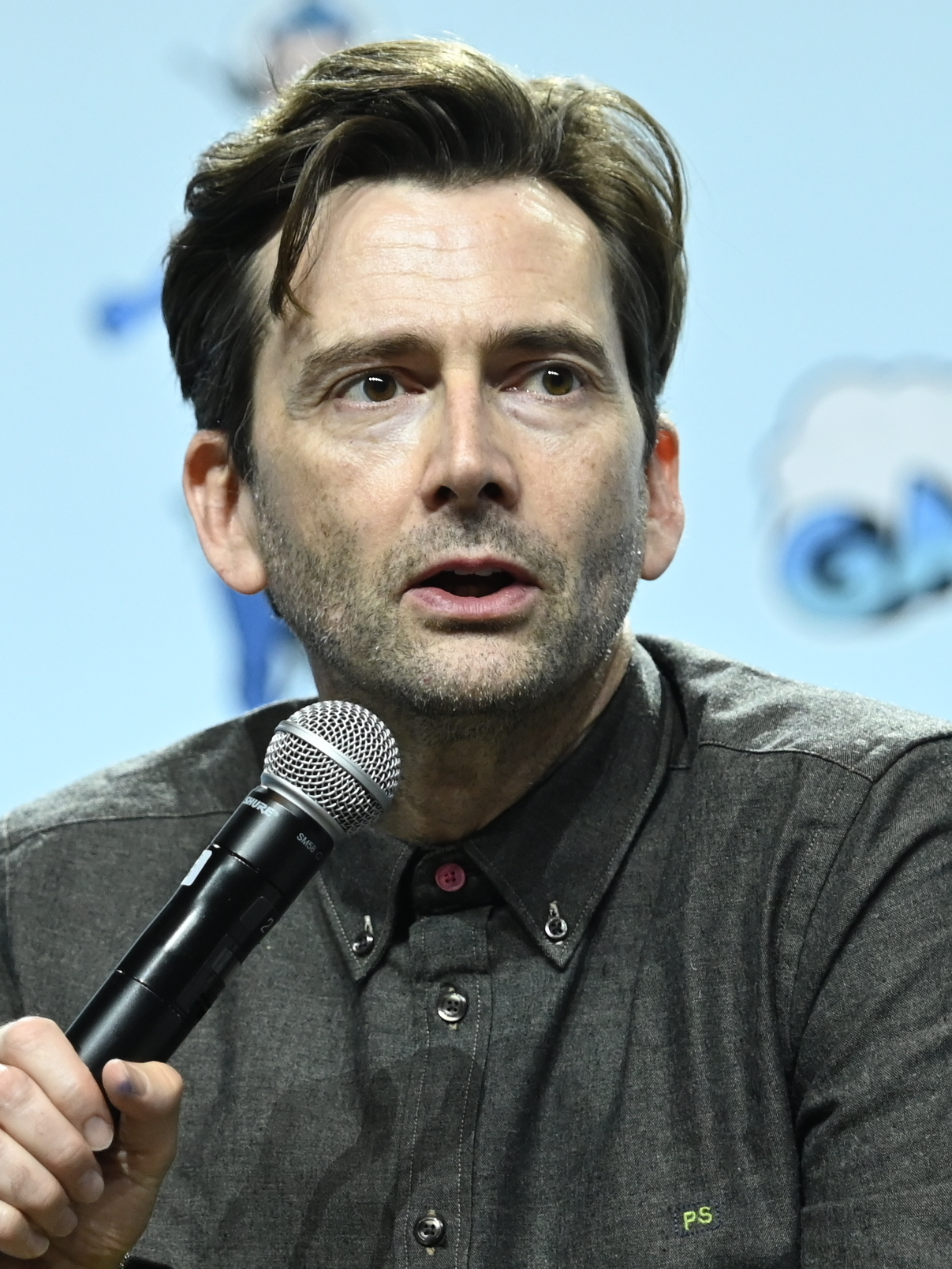
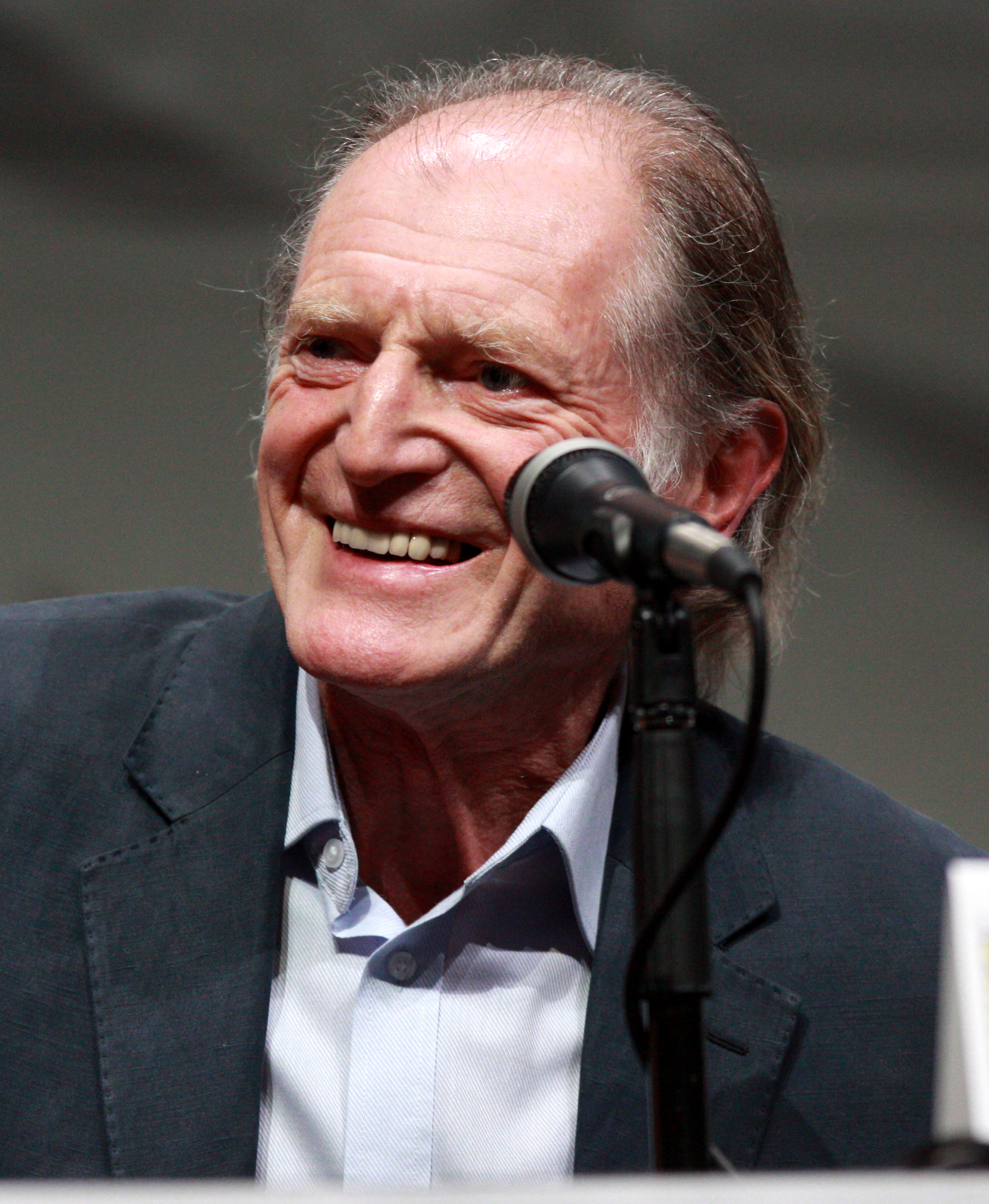
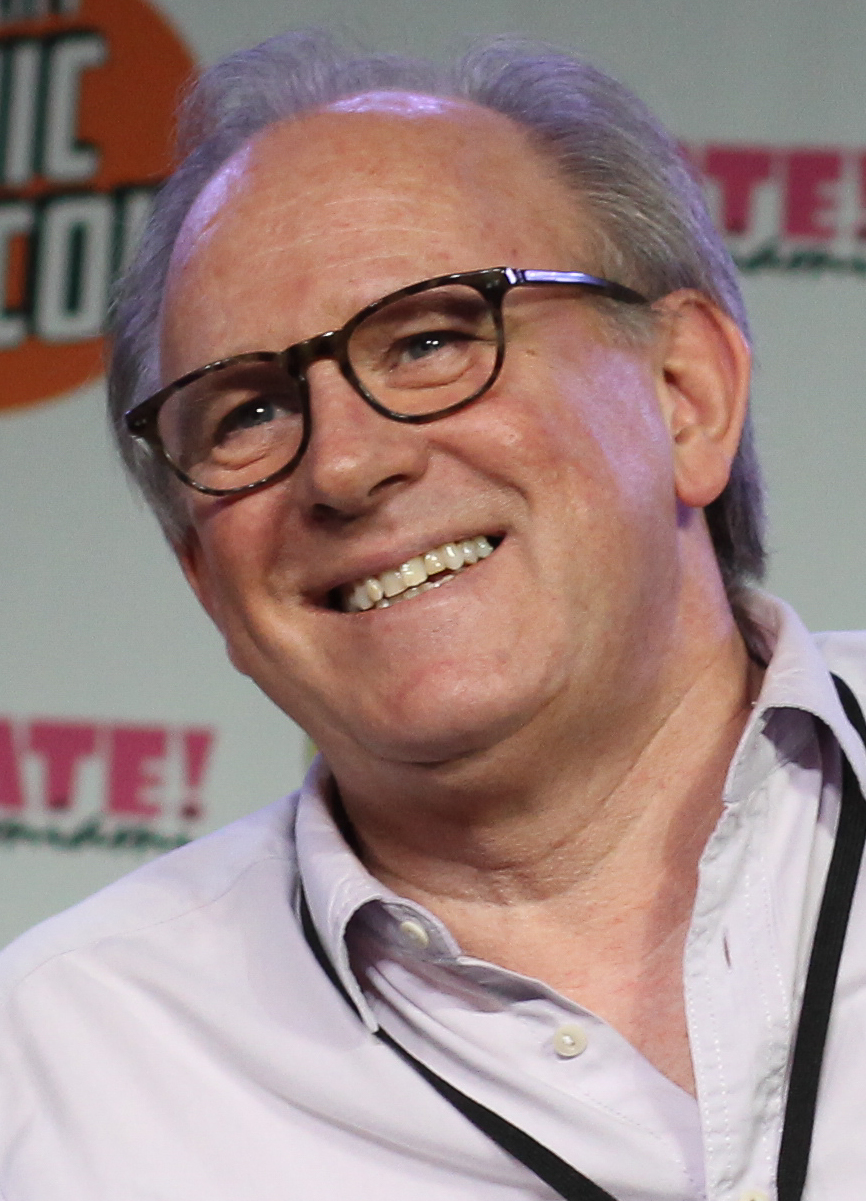
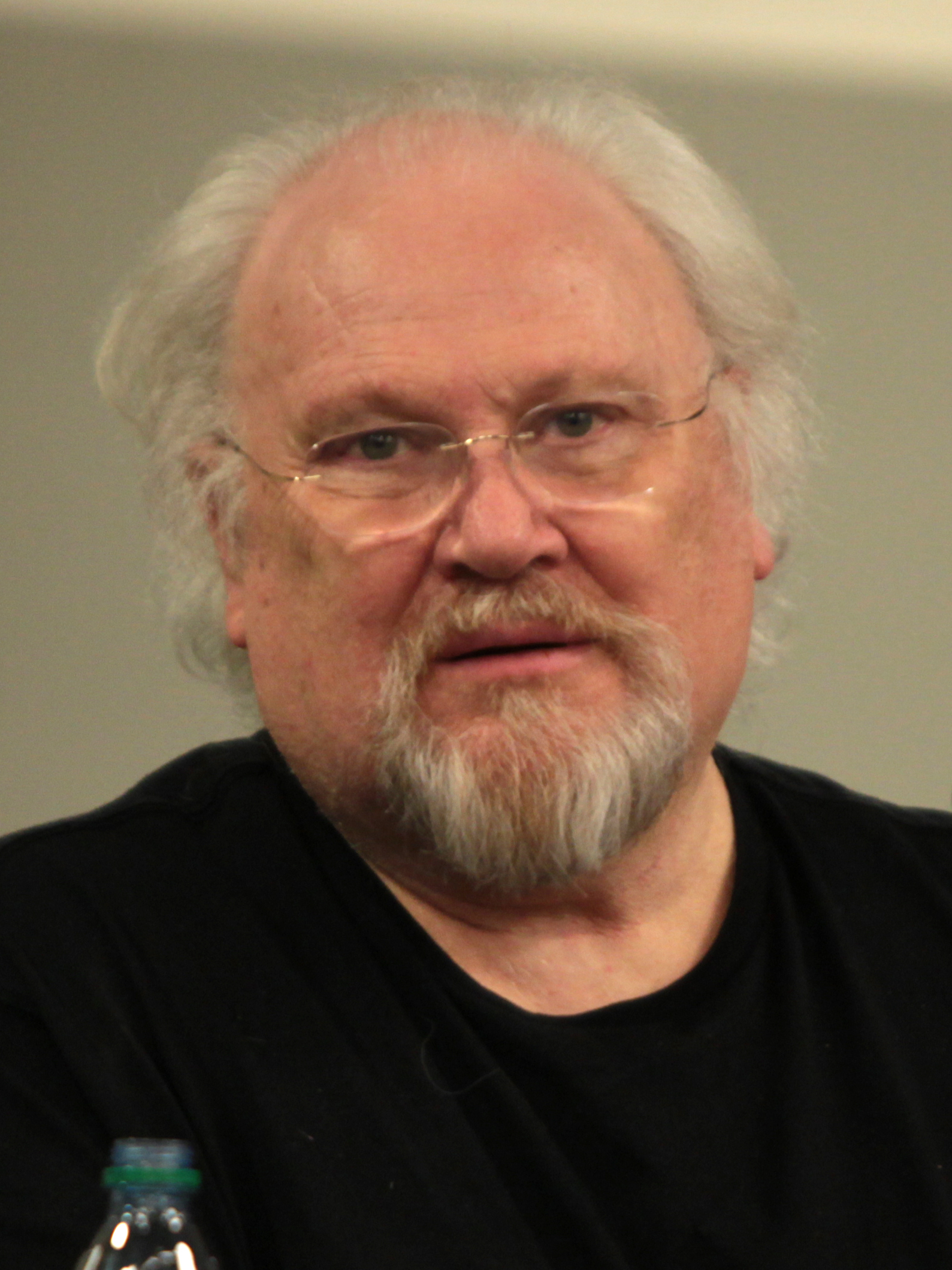
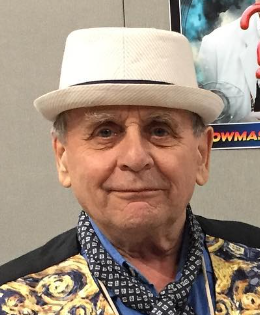
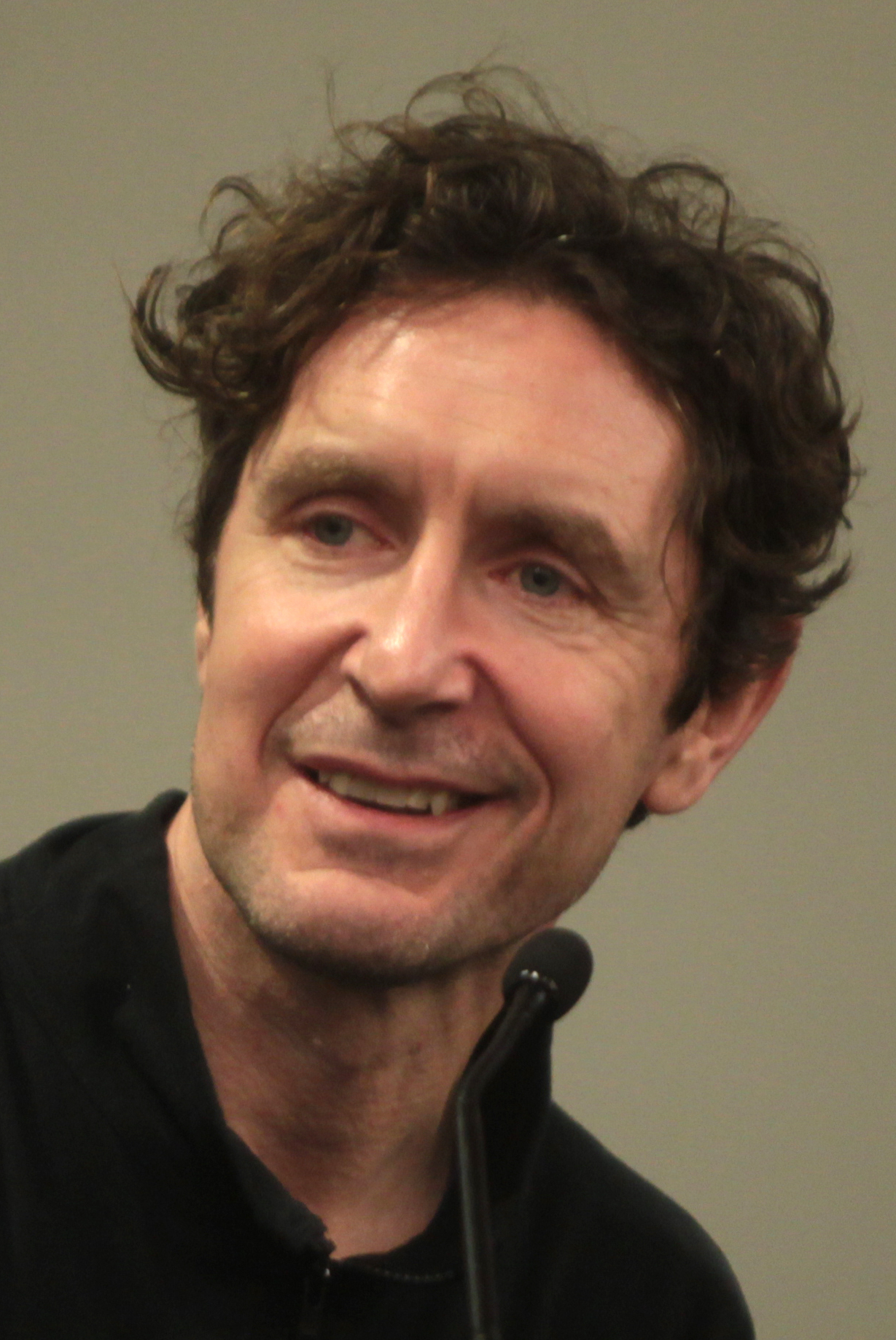
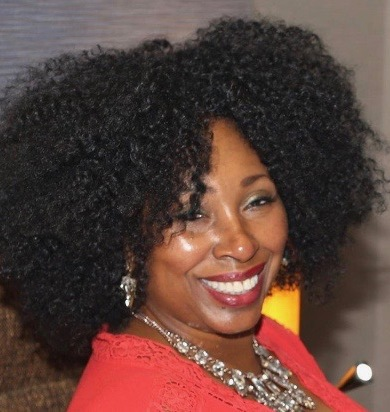
Multiple actors portrayed different incarnations of the Doctor in the episode.

Clockwise from top left: Jodie Whittaker, David Tennant, David Bradley, Peter Davison, Jo Martin, Paul McGann, Sylvester McCoy, and Colin Baker.

Jodie Whittaker makes her final regular appearance in the episode as the thirteenth incarnation of the Doctor, with Mandip Gill and John Bishop departing the programme as the Doctor's companions, Yasmin Khan and Dan Lewis. Bishop has a significantly reduced role in the special, only appearing in the cold open and one of the final scenes. Also starring in the episode are Janet Fielding and Sophie Aldred who returned to the programme as former companions Tegan Jovanka and Ace. Fielding last appeared in the 1984 serial Resurrection of the Daleks, while Aldred was last seen in the 1989 story Survival. On their return, Chibnall said he believed Fielding and Aldred's original eras to be representative of specific times in Doctor Who's history.

In cameo roles, the First, Fifth, Sixth, Seventh, Eighth and Fugitive Doctors appear. The First Doctor is portrayed by David Bradley, who previously portrayed the character in the episodes "The Doctor Falls" and "Twice Upon a Time" (both 2017), as well as portraying the original First Doctor actor William Hartnell in the bio-drama An Adventure in Space and Time (2013), while the others are played by their respective original actors: Peter Davison, Colin Baker, Sylvester McCoy, Paul McGann and Jo Martin. Davison stated he was delighted to return and that he was "always very happy to come back." McCoy felt very emotional about his return and was glad to finally give closure to the Seventh Doctor and Ace. According to Chibnall, Fourth Doctor actor Tom Baker was invited to appear in the episode but was unavailable. Chibnall did not ask Christopher Eccleston, Matt Smith or Peter Capaldi as he wanted the focus on the classic Doctors. David Tennant, who previously portrayed the Tenth Doctor, makes a brief appearance as the Fourteenth Doctor.

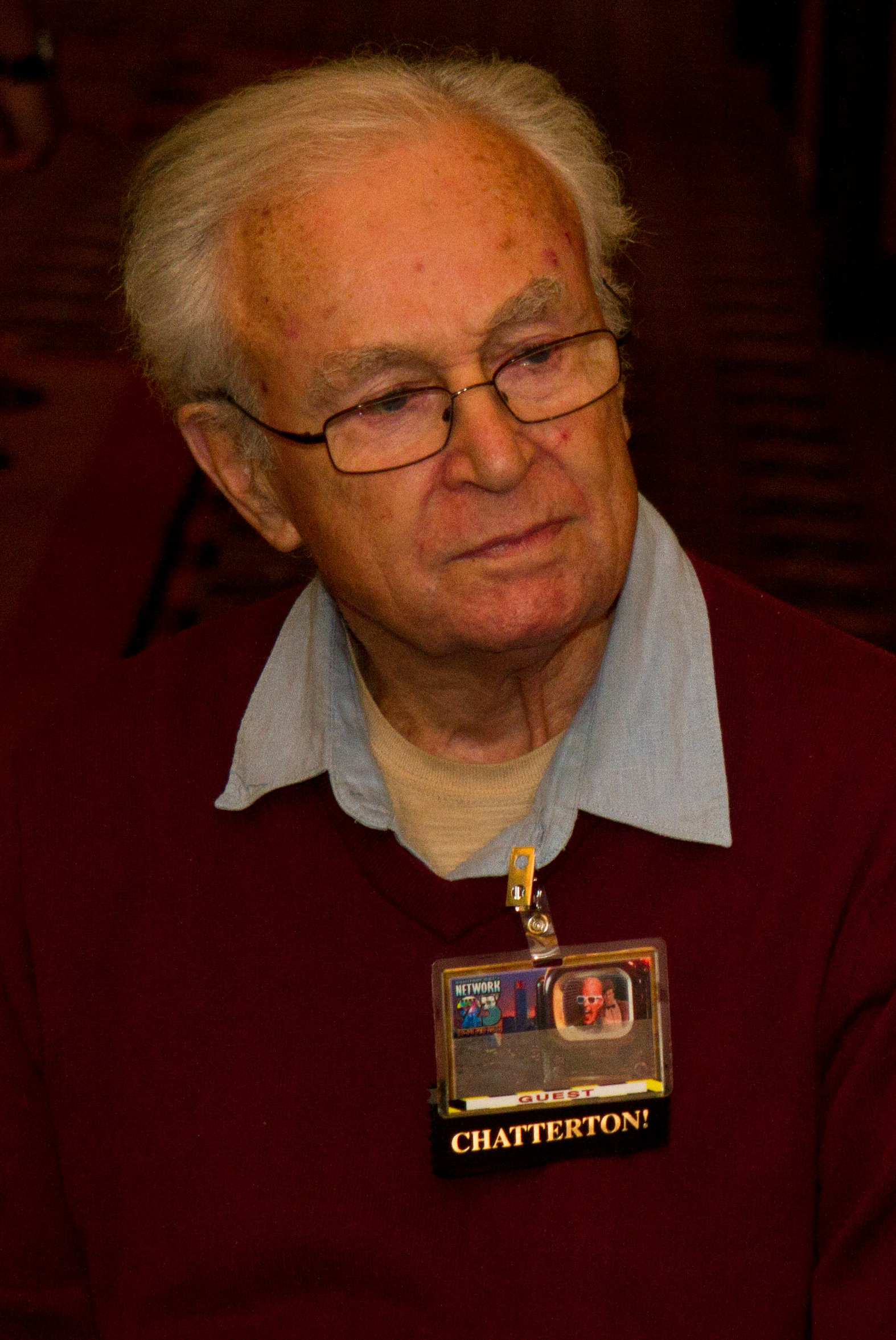
William Russell appears as Ian Chesterton for the first time since his departure in 1965.

Among the guest cast are performers who made previous appearances in Chibnall's era. Dhawan played the latest incarnation of the Master and Patrick O'Kane portrayed Ashad, both of whom first appeared in the twelfth series. Returning from the thirteenth series are Jemma Redgrave as Kate Lethbridge-Stewart and Jacob Anderson as Vinder. Bradley Walsh guest starred as Graham O'Brien, another former companion who last appeared in "Revolution of the Daleks" (2021). Nicholas Briggs voiced the Daleks and the Cybermen. The remainder of the guest cast included Richard Dempsey, Anna Andresen, Sanchia McCormack, Joe Sims, Danielle Bjelic, and Jos Slovick.

Former companions Ian Chesterton, Jo Jones and Mel Bush, portrayed by William Russell, Katy Manning and Bonnie Langford, respectively, appear in brief cameos near the end of the episode. In an interview with Doctor Who Magazine Langford described her appearance in the episode as being "last minute" and was pleased with the fan reception to the scene. With 57 years since his last appearance in the final episode of The Chase (1965), Russell achieved the Guinness world record for the longest gap between television appearances. Chibnall's original script included the possibility of other returning companions, such as Martha Jones, Ryan Sinclair, and Jackie Tyler. Anneke Wills was approached to reprise her role as Polly Wright but was unavailable.

=== Filming ===
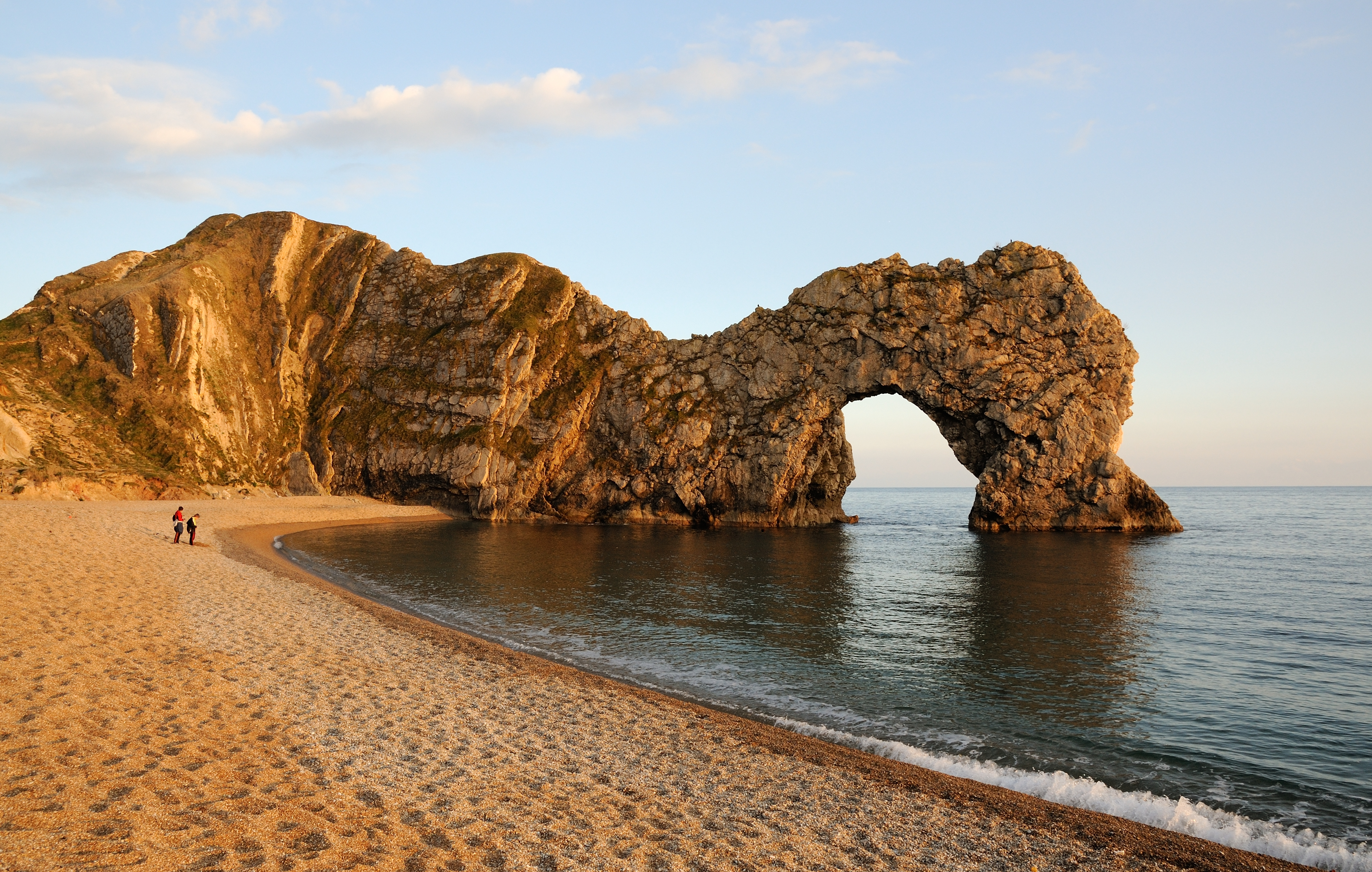
Durdle Door in Dorset served as the backdrop for the regeneration scene.

"The Power of the Doctor" was directed by Jamie Magnus Stone. It was filmed in Cardiff in September and October 2021. Production was impacted by the COVID-19 pandemic. Among the musical cues heard in the episode is "Rasputin" by Germany-based pop and Eurodisco group Boney M. which was originally released in 1978. The Master, disguised as Rasputin, uses the song to accompany his impending transformation. Dhawan noted that he was given only "one or two takes" for the set piece, "and we didn't have that long to shoot it". He later said he misread the original script and was not actually instructed to dance while the song was being played.

The backdrop for the regeneration scene was filmed with a drone at Durdle Door in Dorset. Whittaker's filming for the scene took place on a green screen at Roath Lock Studios. The Lulworth Estate, which owns Durdle Door, was not informed of the context of the scene when granting permission for the shoot. After the episode's broadcast, they expressed concern that it would encourage viewers to place themselves in danger as well as add a burden to their employees and emergency rescue services. The estate considered banning the BBC from future filming at the location. Whittaker and Gill concluded filming their scenes by 13 October, with Whittaker's last-filmed scene being the Doctor's regeneration. The episode was in picture lock by February 2022. Post-production and visual effects work continued into 2022 under the working title "the Centenary Special". Tennant's portion of the regeneration was filmed on a green screen on 13 May 2022 at Bad Wolf Studios, where sound stages had since relocated. Rachel Talalay directed Tennant's scene as Stone was unavailable due to conflicting filming of another production in Australia.

== Release and reception ==
Professional ratings
Aggregate scores
Source	Rating
Rotten Tomatoes (Tomatometer)	100%
Rotten Tomatoes (Average Score)	7.30/10
Review scores
Source	Rating
The Telegraph	4/5 stars
Radio Times	4/5 stars
The Independent	3/5 stars
The Guardian	4/5 stars
Evening Standard	4/5 stars
Metro	4/5 stars

=== Broadcast and home media ===
An advanced screening of the episode for the press occurred in London at the Curzon Bloomsbury theatre on 11 October 2022, with cast and crew members in attendance. The regeneration scene was omitted from this showing. "The Power of the Doctor" was first broadcast to the public on BBC One on 23 October 2022 as part of the BBC's special centenary programming. With a runtime of 87 minutes, it is the longest Doctor Who episode in the revived era. The episode was broadcast the same day on BBC America in the United States and on CTV Sci-Fi in Canada. It was also broadcast on ABC TV Plus in Australia on 24 October.

"The Power of the Doctor" received a standalone home media release in Region 2/B on 7 November 2022, in Region 4/B on 7 December 2022, and in Region 1/A on 13 December 2022. The episode is also included in the 2022 specials home video SteelBook, released in Region 2/B on 7 November 2022.

Selected pieces of the score from this special were digitally released on 16 December 2022. A physical CD release containing all 3 soundtracks of the 2022 specials was released on 13 January 2023.

=== Ratings ===
The episode was watched by 3.7 million viewers overnight, with peak viewership reaching 4 million during the regeneration scene. The final consolidated ratings for the episode were 5.295 million viewers, making it the fifth most watched programme overall for the week. The BBC America broadcast was viewed by 317,000 people.

=== Critical response ===
The episode received mostly positive reviews from critics. On the review aggregator website Rotten Tomatoes, 100% of 12 critics' reviews are positive, with an average rating of 7.30/10. The regeneration scene won an award for "TV Moment of the Year" at the Edinburgh TV Festival. Reviewing the episode for Radio Times, Patrick Mulkern said the episode "brings an erratic four-year chapter of this constantly evolving saga to a satisfying close". Mulkern particularly found enjoyment in the multiple-Doctor aspect, but still found a few plot holes. Isobel Lewis with The Independent wrote that Whittaker's departure "feels bittersweet". Lewis further stated that the special "sounds as thrilling as it gets", although she criticised the ending of the relationship between the Doctor and Yaz. The Guardian's Rebecca Nicholson felt that the episode was paced well and praised the return of old characters. Gabriel Tate of Metro shared similar sentiments, writing that he appreciated the numerous past references. Writing for The Telegraph, Michael Hogan called "The Power of the Doctor" the best episode of Chibnall's Doctor Who-era and said it was "an electrifying thrill-ride of non-stop surprises".
