= Survivors of the Flux =

297e – "Survivors of the Flux"
- Doctor Who episode

Cast
- Doctor: Jodie Whittaker – Thirteenth Doctor
- Companions: Mandip Gill – Yasmin Khan; John Bishop – Dan Lewis
- Others: Kevin McNally – Professor Jericho; Barbara Flynn – Tecteun; Craig Parkinson – Prentis/Grand Serpent; Robert Bathurst – Farquhar; Craige Els – Karvanista; Thaddea Graham – Bel; Jacob Anderson – Vinder; Sam Spruell – Swarm; Rochenda Sandall – Azure; Nadia Albina – Diane; Nicholas Blane – Millington; Steve Oram – Joseph Williamson; Jemma Redgrave – Kate Stewart; Jonathan Watson – Sontaran Commander Stenck; Barbara Fadden, Isla Moody, Lowri Brown – Weeping Angels; Simon Carew – Ood; Silas Carson – Voice of the Ood; Guy List – Waiter; Jonny Mathers – Passenger; Nicholas Courtney – Alistair Lethbridge-Stewart; Kammy Darweish – Kumar; George Caple – Alfie

Production
- Directed by: Azhur Saleem
- Written by: Chris Chibnall
- Produced by: Pete Levy
- Executive producers: Chris Chibnall; Matt Strevens; Nikki Wilson
- Music by: Segun Akinola
- Series: Series 13
- Running time: 5th of 6-part story, 50 minutes
- First broadcast: 28 November 2021

Chronology
| ← Preceded by "Village of the Angels" | Followed by → "The Vanquishers" |

"Survivors of the Flux", prefixed frequently with either "Chapter Five" or "Flux", is the fifth and penultimate episode of the thirteenth series of the British science fiction television programme Doctor Who, and of the six-episode serial known collectively as Doctor Who: Flux. It was first broadcast on BBC One on 28 November 2021. It was written by showrunner and executive producer Chris Chibnall, and directed by Azhur Saleem.

The episode stars Jodie Whittaker as the Thirteenth Doctor, alongside Mandip Gill and John Bishop as her companions, Yasmin Khan and Dan Lewis, respectively.

== Plot ==
The Weeping Angels transport the Doctor to a spacecraft carrying Division's head, Awsok from "Once, Upon Time", who is ordering an Ood to create a final Flux event. Awsok explains Division's involvement in the development of this current, and upcoming, universes. Division's spacecraft is travelling to another universe, as a "seed vault" containing genetic remnants of this universe. Awsok blames the Doctor for destroying this universe because the Doctor defected and interfered with Division's work. Thus, Division engineered the Flux to destroy this universe, with the Doctor still in it. Awsok reveals herself to be Tecteun, the Gallifreyan who found the young Doctor by a wormhole and raised her, while creating Time Lords ("The Timeless Children"). The Doctor blames Tecteun for robbing her of a life that could have been, but Tecteun counters that the Doctor does the same when she takes companions. Tecteun reveals the possession of a fob watch with the Doctor's lost memories.

Dan, Yaz, and Jericho travel around the world in 1904 to try to discover the date for world's end, evading countless assassins. A Nepalese hermit suggests they should reunite with Karvanista; although they leave a message for him at the Great Wall of China, he cannot use time travel so cannot respond. The trio search out Joseph Williamson and the mysterious tunnels he dug under Liverpool, realizing he had discovered doorways leading to various time periods and locations.

In 1958, a general asks the Grand Serpent, going by "Prentis", to help form UNIT. Prentis embeds himself into UNIT leadership over the decades, eliminating potential threats to him. In 2017, when he closes UNIT down, Kate Stewart realises his deception and threatens to expose him. After a failed assassination attempt, she goes into hiding. With UNIT eliminated, in 2021 Prentis orders Earth's defences be lowered, inviting a second Sontaran invasion.

When a Lupari ship falls from Earth's shield, Karvanista recalls the missing Lupari ship stolen by Bel, just as she was arriving at the source of the Passenger signal. With Karvanista on board, Sontaran forces attack Bel's ship. Vinder also pursues the Passenger signal, arriving moments after Bel's ship is recalled, but finding kidnapped survivors being disintegrated by Swarm and Azure for use as a power source. As he intended, Vinder is captured by Swarm in a Passenger, where he meets Diane.

Swarm and Azure arrive on the Division spacecraft and plan on exacting revenge upon Division for imprisoning them. Swarm disintegrates Tecteun and approaches the Doctor to do the same.

== Production ==
=== Development ===
"Survivors of the Flux" was written by showrunner and executive producer Chris Chibnall.

=== Casting ===
The series is the third to feature Jodie Whittaker as the Thirteenth Doctor, and Mandip Gill as Yasmin Khan, with John Bishop having joined the cast for the series as Dan Lewis. Jemma Redgrave reprised her role as recurring character Kate Stewart, having been absent from the series since "The Zygon Invasion" / "The Zygon Inversion" (2015). The episode also featured an off-screen voice cameo from Nicholas Courtney, using archive audio, as Alastair Lethbridge-Stewart, the father of Redgrave's character.

=== Filming ===
Azhur Saleem directed the second block, which comprised the third, fifth, and sixth episodes of the series.

== Broadcast and reception ==
Professional ratings
Aggregate scores
| Source | Rating |
|---|---|
| Rotten Tomatoes (Tomatometer) | 80% |
| Rotten Tomatoes (Average Score) | 6.30/10 |
Review scores
| Source | Rating |
| The A.V. Club | B+ |
| Radio Times | 4/5 stars |
| The Independent | 3/5 stars |
| The Telegraph | 2/5 stars |

=== Broadcast ===
"Survivors of the Flux" aired on 28 November 2021. The episode serves as the fifth part of a six-part story, entitled Flux.

=== Ratings ===
Overnight the episode was seen by 3.82 million viewers. The seven-day consolidated rating (counting all views across all platforms within seven days of broadcast) was 4.83 million. The episode was the ninth-highest rated programme on BBC1 for the week, and the 21st-highest programme across all channels for the week.

=== Critical reception ===
On Rotten Tomatoes, a review aggregator website, 80% of five critics gave the episode a positive review, with an average rating of 6.3 out of 10. The character of Tecteun was criticised by several reviewers. Martin Belam of The Guardian called the scenes between the Doctor and Tecteun “tense”, but noted the lack of characterisation for Tecteun beforehand “for it to have real bite”. He also criticised how the character is immediately “bumped off”. Chris Allcock called “Tecteun’s motivations very messy” and “also largely meaningless” due to her sudden death. In a review for The Daily Telegraph, Michael Hogan criticised the character’s personality and death, with Caroline Siede of The A.V. Club similarly criticising her reveal and death as “flat”. Bleeding Cool's Adi Tantimedh criticised Tecteun as a "smug and bored" character.
