= Village of the Angels =

297d – "Village of the Angels"
- Doctor Who episode

Cast
- Doctor: Jodie Whittaker – Thirteenth Doctor
- Companions: Mandip Gill – Yasmin Khan; John Bishop – Dan Lewis
- Others: Kevin McNally – Professor Jericho; Annabel Scholey – Claire Brown; Alex Frost – Reverend Shaw; Vincent Brimble – Gerald; Jemma Churchill – Jean; Penelope McGhie – Mrs Hayward; Thaddea Graham – Bel; Blake Harrison – Namaca; Jacob Anderson – Vinder; Poppy Polivnicki – Peggy; Rochenda Sandall – Azure; Barbara Fadden, Isla Moody, Lowri Brown – Weeping Angels; Jonny Mathers – Passenger

Production
- Directed by: Jamie Magnus Stone
- Written by: Chris Chibnall and Maxine Alderton
- Produced by: Nikki Wilson
- Executive producers: Chris Chibnall; Matt Strevens; Nikki Wilson
- Music by: Segun Akinola
- Series: Series 13
- Running time: 4th of 6-part story, 56 minutes
- First broadcast: 21 November 2021

Chronology
← Preceded by "Once, Upon Time"	Followed by → "Survivors of the Flux"

"Village of the Angels", prefixed frequently with either "Chapter Four" or "Flux", is the fourth episode of the thirteenth series of the British science fiction television programme Doctor Who, and of the six-episode serial known collectively as Doctor Who: Flux. It was first broadcast on BBC One on 21 November 2021. It was written by showrunner and executive producer Chris Chibnall and Maxine Alderton, and directed by Jamie Magnus Stone.

The episode stars Jodie Whittaker as the Thirteenth Doctor, alongside Mandip Gill and John Bishop as her companions, Yasmin Khan and Dan Lewis, respectively.

== Plot ==
The Doctor reboots the TARDIS to force out the Weeping Angel, but it strands her, Yaz and Dan in the village of Medderton, on 21 November 1967. Yaz and Dan join the search for Peggy, a missing girl, while the elderly Mrs. Hayward warns the villagers to evacuate. The Doctor finds a laboratory where Professor Jericho is conducting psychic experiments on Claire, who was sent back in time from 2021 ("The Halloween Apocalypse"). Jericho's home is surrounded by Angels interested in Claire, who reveals to the Doctor that Medderton is the site of a mass disappearance that occurs that night and in 1901. An Angel sends Yaz and Dan back to Medderton in 1901 where they find Peggy. They encounter Mrs. Hayward in 1967, on the other side of an energy barrier. Mrs. Hayward reveals she is Peggy's future self.

Back in 1967, the Doctor, Claire, and Jericho barricade themselves in the basement, while Claire reveals she is slowly becoming an Angel. As a seer, she had a premonition of an Angel which led to its image seizing her mind. The Doctor enters Claire's mind to get rid of the Angel and learns it hijacked the TARDIS and is hiding from the other Angels, members of the Division's extraction squad. The rogue Angel claims to have knowledge of the Division, offering to return the Doctor's missing memories if she helps it escape. Jericho disrupts the link because the Angels are breaking in. They escape through a tunnel, but the Angels send Jericho to 1901 and corner Claire and the Doctor. The Doctor learns the Angels have taken the village out of time and space in order to capture the rogue Angel. The Doctor tries to make a deal with the Angels, but the rogue Angel reveals it offered the Doctor to them for its own safety. The Doctor is recalled to the Division as she is turned into a Weeping Angel.

Meanwhile, Bel lands her ship on the planet Puzano, where she witnesses many Flux survivors tricked into being imprisoned in a Passenger by Azure. She gives Namaca, who she saved from Azure, a message before pursuing Azure.

In a mid-credits scene, Vinder arrives on Puzano, finds Namaca alongside Bel's message, and vows to keep searching.

== Production ==
=== Development ===
"Village of the Angels" was co-written by showrunner and executive producer Chris Chibnall as well as Maxine Alderton who returned from the twelfth series. It is the only episode of the series to feature a writer other than Chibnall.

Chris Chibnall has stated that the storyline of "Village of the Angels" began with the idea of an episode exploring psychic research in the 1960s. The Weeping Angels and the character of Jericho were then woven in later. The episode also featured a mid-credits scene.

=== Casting ===
The series is the third to feature Jodie Whittaker as the Thirteenth Doctor, and Mandip Gill as Yasmin Khan, with John Bishop having joined the cast for the series as Dan Lewis. Kevin McNally previously appeared in the serial The Twin Dilemma (1984). Vincent Brimble also previously appeared in the serial Warriors of the Deep (1984).

=== Filming ===
Jamie Magnus Stone directed the first block, which comprised the first, second, and fourth episodes of the series.

== Broadcast and reception ==
Professional ratings
Aggregate scores
Source	Rating
Rotten Tomatoes (Tomatometer)	100%
Rotten Tomatoes (Average Score)	8.0/10
Review scores
Source	Rating
The A.V. Club	A−
Radio Times	5/5 stars
The Independent	4/5 stars
The Telegraph	3/5 stars

=== Broadcast ===
"Village of the Angels" aired on 21 November 2021. The episode serves as the fourth part of a six-part story, entitled Flux.

=== Ratings ===
Overnight the episode was seen by 3.45 million viewers. The episode received an Audience Appreciation Index score of 79. The seven day consolidated rating (counting all views across all platforms within seven days of broadcast) was 4.57 million. The episode was the eighth-highest rated programme on BBC1 for the week, and the 18th-highest programme across all channels for the week.

=== Critical reception ===
On Rotten Tomatoes, a review aggregator website, 100% of seven critics gave the episode a positive review, with an average rating of 8.0 out of 10.

Michael Hogan and Caroline Siede from The Telegraph and The A.V. Club, respectively, praised the introduction of new characters, Claire and Professor Jericho. Hogan described McNally's performance of Jericho as "superb" and Scholey's performance of Claire as "excellent".
