= War of the Sontarans =

297b – "War of the Sontarans"
- Doctor Who episode

Cast
- Doctor: Jodie Whittaker – Thirteenth Doctor
- Companions: Mandip Gill – Yasmin Khan; John Bishop – Dan Lewis
- Others: Jonathan Watson – Skaak/Sontaran Commander Riskaw; Sara Powell – Mary Seacole; Jacob Anderson – Vinder; Sue Jenkins – Eileen; Paul Broughton – Neville; Steve Oram – Joseph Williamson; Gerald Kyd – General Logan; Dan Starkey – Svild; Sam Spruell – Swarm; Rochenda Sandall – Azure; Craige Els – Karvanista; Jonny Mathers – Passenger; Nigel Richard Lambert – Priest Triangle

Production
- Directed by: Jamie Magnus Stone
- Written by: Chris Chibnall
- Produced by: Nikki Wilson
- Executive producers: Chris Chibnall; Matt Strevens; Nikki Wilson
- Music by: Segun Akinola
- Series: Series 13
- Running time: 2nd of 6-part story, 59 minutes
- First broadcast: 7 November 2021

Chronology
← Preceded by "The Halloween Apocalypse"	Followed by → "Once, Upon Time"

"War of the Sontarans", prefixed frequently with either "Chapter Two" or "Flux", is the second episode of the thirteenth series of the British science fiction television programme Doctor Who, and of the six-episode serial known collectively as Doctor Who: Flux. It was first broadcast on BBC One on 7 November 2021. It was written by showrunner and executive producer Chris Chibnall, and directed by Jamie Magnus Stone.

The episode stars Jodie Whittaker as the Thirteenth Doctor, alongside Mandip Gill and John Bishop as her companions, Yasmin Khan and Dan Lewis, respectively.

== Plot ==
The Doctor, Dan, and Yaz are transported to Sevastopol during what at first sight appears to be the Crimean War. There they all briefly meet Mary Seacole before Yaz and Dan are transported away through time. The Doctor is unable to enter her TARDIS to track and find them. Remaining in Sevastopol, the Doctor realizes Britain's opponents in the war are now the Sontarans, with all traces of China and Russia replaced with Sontar. Tricking a scout into granting parley with his general, the Doctor discovers that seconds prior to the Lupari shielding Earth from the Flux in the previous episode, the Sontarans took advantage of the Flux and rewrote human history to feed their species’ hunger for battle.

Yaz materializes in the Temple of Atropos on the planet Time, where she briefly encounters Joseph Williamson before befriending Vinder. They are both recruited as repairers of the temple’s mainframe. Swarm and Azure arrive to take control of the temple and use its power for themselves.

Dan is transported back to Liverpool, where he finds a world overtaken by the Sontarans. Saved from a Sontaran unit by his parents, he learns a three-minute blackout caused by the Lupari shield allowed the Sontaran fleet to land first at the Liverpool docks, where they established a base of operations. Dan sneaks onto one of the Sontaran ships and contacts the Doctor who tasks him with ending the Sontaran offensive in 2021.

Dan is discovered by the Sontarans but is saved by Karvanista. The pair destroy the primary fleet by ramming their captured vessel into the shipyard and evacuating at the last moment, resetting the timeline. Poisoning the supply system of the Sontarans in Crimea, the Doctor cripples their offensive, forcing them to retreat, but the British General Logan bombs their vessels as revenge for massacring his troops. The Doctor regains access to the TARDIS to collect Dan and find Yaz.

The TARDIS malfunctions and forces the Doctor and Dan into the temple, through which all temporal energy must pass. The Flux phenomena has caused the death of the Mouri gatekeepers and ruin of the temple, and now seeking to control time for himself, Swarm has imprisoned Yaz and Vinder as replacement bodies for the Mouri. Knowing the power unleashed will kill Yaz, the Doctor begs Swarm not to activate the temple, but he ignores her and takes control.

== Production ==
=== Development ===
"War of the Sontarans" was written by showrunner and executive producer Chris Chibnall.

=== Casting ===
The series is the third to feature Jodie Whittaker as the Thirteenth Doctor, and Mandip Gill as Yasmin Khan, with John Bishop having joined the cast for the series as Dan Lewis.

=== Filming ===
Jamie Magnus Stone, who directed four episodes of the previous series, directed the first block, which comprised the first, second and fourth episodes of the series.

== Broadcast and reception ==
Professional ratings
Aggregate scores
Source	Rating
Rotten Tomatoes (Tomatometer)	100%
Rotten Tomatoes (Average Score)	7.3/10
Review scores
Source	Rating
Radio Times	3/5 stars
The A.V. Club	B
The Independent	3/5 stars
The Telegraph	4/5 stars

=== Broadcast ===
"War of the Sontarans" aired on 7 November 2021. The episode serves as the second part of a six-part story, entitled Flux. In the United States the episode aired on BBC America on the same date, where it returned to its regular timeslot following an earlier broadcast the preceding week for the premiere episode.

=== Ratings ===
Overnight the episode was seen by 3.96 million viewers. The consolidated viewing figure across all platforms for those who watched the show within seven days of broadcast was 5.10 million viewers. This made it the 13th most viewed programme on all UK TV for the week and the 4th most viewed on BBC1. The episode received an Audience Appreciation Index score of 77.

=== Critical reception ===
On review aggregator Rotten Tomatoes, 100% of seven critics gave the episode a positive review, and an average rating of 7.3/10.

Michael Hogan of the Telegraph wrote that the episode was "zipping along with verve and energy" and praised how John Bishop's portrayal of Dan combined both wit and emotional vulnerability.
