= Maxine Alderton =

British screenwriter

- Occupation: Screenwriter
- Known for: Emmerdale; Doctor Who

Maxine Alderton is a British screenwriter, best known for her work on the BBC science fiction television series Doctor Who.

== Career ==
Beginning as a script editor in the mid 2000s, Alderton graduated to writing for the long-running ITV soap opera Emmerdale, writing over 124 episodes since 2013. She won Best Writer at the Royal Television Society Yorkshire Awards in 2017.

She has also written for the first two series of The Worst Witch, and in 2020, contributed the eighth episode of the twelfth series of Doctor Who, "The Haunting of Villa Diodati." The episode was set on the night Mary Shelley was inspired to write Frankenstein. She returned to co-write the fourth episode, "Village of the Angels," with Chris Chibnall for the thirteenth series (known as Flux). The episode saw the return of recurring villains, the Weeping Angels. It is the only episode of Flux to be written by someone other than showrunner Chibnall. The episode also featured a mid-credits scene, something unusual for the programme.

Alderton also wrote episodes for the fourth, fifth and seventh series of Channel 5's period drama All Creatures Great and Small, and the second series of ITV's After the Flood.
