= Doctor Who series 13 =

2021 series of Doctor Who

Doctor Who
- Series 13
- DVD box set cover art
- Showrunner: Chris Chibnall
- Starring: Jodie Whittaker; Mandip Gill; John Bishop
- No. of stories: 1
- No. of episodes: 6

Release
- Original network: BBC One
- Original release: 31 October – 5 December 2021

Season chronology
- ← Previous; Series 12 Next → 2022 specials

The thirteenth series of the British science fiction television programme Doctor Who, known collectively as Flux, was broadcast from 31 October to 5 December 2021. The series is the third and last to be led by Chris Chibnall as head writer and executive producer. It is the thirteenth to air following the programme's revival in 2005, and the thirty-ninth season overall. The series, initially announced in November 2019, was the last to be broadcast on Sunday nights, continuing the trend set by the previous two series. It was followed by three associated specials, all of which aired in 2022.

Jodie Whittaker returns for her third and final series as the Thirteenth Doctor, an incarnation of the Doctor, an alien Time Lord who travels through time and space in her ship, the TARDIS, which externally assumes the appearance of a British police box. The thirteenth series also stars Mandip Gill and John Bishop as the Doctor's travelling companions, playing Yasmin Khan and Dan Lewis, respectively. The series follows the Thirteenth Doctor and her companions as they navigate a universe-ending anomaly called the "Flux", while dealing with enemies and secrets from the Doctor's past.

The series consists of six episodes, which form a single story across the series. The six episodes were directed by Jamie Magnus Stone and Azhur Saleem; Stone returned from directing for the previous series, with Saleem directing as a new contributor. Chibnall wrote all six episodes of the series, co-writing one episode with Maxine Alderton, who also returned after writing for the previous series. Filming commenced in November 2020, and was completed by August 2021. The series has received generally positive reviews from critics.

== Episodes ==
For the first time since The Trial of a Time Lord (1986), and the third time in the programme's history, the series tells one complete story across its entirety, rather than self-contained episodic stories. It is the second time where all episodes are encompassed by a single story number; The Key to Time (1978–79) maintained separate serial designations.

No. story	No. in series	Title (Note: These titles are normally prefixed with their respective "Chapter" number, or with the overall serial title "Flux".)	Directed by	Written by	Original release date	UK viewers (millions)	AI
297a	1	"The Halloween Apocalypse"	Jamie Magnus Stone	Chris Chibnall	31 October 2021	5.81	76
The Doctor and Yaz pursue Karvanista, of the Lupari species, to Liverpool, where he kidnaps tradesman Dan Lewis. The Doctor experiences a psychic vision of the mysterious Swarm, who claims to share a history with her, escaping from his imprisonment by the Time Lord Division. Before leaving Liverpool the Doctor and Yaz meet Claire, a woman from their future. Shortly after, a Weeping Angel sends Claire to 1965. On Karvanista's ship, Yaz rescues Dan while the Doctor confronts Karvanista over his connection to the Division, before addressing the Lupari's apparent invasion plan. Karvanista tells them the Lupari are actually saving humanity from Earth's destruction by the Flux, an unknown, all-consuming phenomenon that defies all laws of space and time. The Flux causes Vinder, the sole occupant of a remote space outpost, to evacuate, and catches the attention of the Sontarans. Following another psychic interaction between the Doctor and Swarm, the Flux accelerates its attack on Earth. The Doctor has Karvanista form a defensive shield with the other Lupari ships, protecting Earth from the Flux. Unable to transport behind the shield, the TARDIS is overtaken by the Flux, with the Doctor, Yaz and Dan inside.
297b	2	"War of the Sontarans"	Jamie Magnus Stone	Chris Chibnall	7 November 2021	5.12	77
The Doctor, Yaz and Dan wake up in Crimean War–era Sevastopol, where the Sontarans have replaced the Russians throughout history, and meet Mary Seacole and General Logan. The Flux's effects send Dan back to 2021 Liverpool, and Yaz to a damaged temple full of dying priests, beside Joseph Williamson and Vinder. The Doctor deduces that the Sontarans slipped past the Lupari's defences. Dan infiltrates the Sontarans' shipyard. Swarm arrives at the temple and reveals it to be in the Atropos region on the planet Time, killing the priests and taking Yaz and Vinder hostage. The Doctor enlists Seacole to gather intelligence on the Sontaran camp, then summons the Sontarans to negotiate a retreat, only to be arrested by Logan's soldiers, who later fight a disastrous battle with them. The Doctor regroups with Seacole and Logan's men, and they disrupt the Sontarans' supplies, but Logan reneges and bombs the camp. The Sontarans discover Dan, but Karvanista rescues him before destroying the shipyard, which resets the timeline. The Doctor manages to recover the TARDIS and collect Dan, but it is hijacked and brought to the temple, where they are forced to watch as Swarm is about to kill Yaz and Vinder.
297c	3	"Once, Upon Time"	Azhur Saleem	Chris Chibnall	14 November 2021	4.70	75
The Doctor jumps into the temple's time storm and stalls Swarm by hiding Dan, Yaz and Vinder in their pasts, albeit with many details changed. Vinder reluctantly relives his time assisting the dictatorial Grand Serpent, and his demotion upon revealing the Serpent's misdeeds. Bel, a survivor of the Flux, travels through its ruins in a Lupari ship, evading Daleks, Sontarans and Cybermen. The Doctor jumps into her own timestream and recovers memories of her past incarnation, the Fugitive Doctor, and her time in the Division. It is revealed that she and Karvanista had previously raided the temple to defeat Swarm and rescue the priests. The present Doctor finds the priests and encourages them to return to life and the temple, but they separate her from her past to protect her. A mysterious old entity reprimands the Doctor. Bel is revealed to be searching for Vinder as his paramour, and is carrying his child. The Doctor returns Yaz, Dan and Vinder to the present and fixes the timestreams. She returns Vinder to his Flux-ravaged home planet, after which a Weeping Angel that had been stalking Yaz intercepts the TARDIS.
297d	4	"Village of the Angels"	Jamie Magnus Stone	Chris Chibnall and Maxine Alderton	21 November 2021	4.57	79
The Doctor reboots the TARDIS, forcing the Angel out and stranding them in the English village of Medderton, 1967. Former soldier Professor Jericho conducts psychic experiments on Claire, who has been sent back in time by the same Angel that had hijacked the TARDIS. An Angel sends Yaz and Dan back to Medderton in 1901, where they find a missing girl named Peggy. They discover a barrier to 1967 and Peggy's future self, who had to live out the rest of her life until then. The Doctor, Claire, and Jericho barricade themselves in his basement as the Angels close in. Claire reveals she is having visions of becoming an Angel, hosting one that has taken residence in her mind. Connecting to the Angel telepathically, the Doctor discovers the Angel is hiding from the other Angels, who are after it under orders from the Division. The Doctor and Claire escape through a tunnel surrounded by Angels, whilst Jericho is sent to 1901. The Doctor learns the Angels have taken the village out of time to capture the rogue Angel, who reveals it has offered the Doctor to the Angels for its own safety. The Doctor is turned into an Angel and transported to the Division, stranding the others in 1901. Bel arrives on Puzano and sees Swarm's accomplice Azure tricking survivors into being harvested for energy. She saves a local from falling into their trap and leaves a message for Vinder.
297e	5	"Survivors of the Flux"	Azhur Saleem	Chris Chibnall	28 November 2021	4.87	77
The Weeping Angels transport the Doctor to the Division where she meets the entity that had previously chastised her, revealed to be her adoptive mother, Tecteun. She reveals that the Division orchestrated the Flux, an antimatter wave, to kill the Doctor for interfering with their plans, and that they have knowledge of the multiverse. In 1904, Yaz, Dan, and Jericho search the world for artifacts and psychics to decipher when the world will end. They meet Williamson, who had discovered several doorways that led to various other places while excavating tunnels under Liverpool. Over many years, the Grand Serpent infiltrates UNIT as an officer, eliminating those who pose a threat to him. After being threatened by Kate Stewart, he deactivates all UNIT defences, allowing the Sontarans to enter Earth. Vinder discovers Swarm harvesting energy from Flux survivors, but he is caught and trapped in a device called a Passenger, where he meets Dan's friend Diane, who had been kidnapped earlier by Swarm and Azure. The Doctor watches helplessly as Swarm arrives, disintegrating Tecteun and threatening to do the same to her.
297f	6	"The Vanquishers"	Azhur Saleem	Chris Chibnall	5 December 2021	4.68	76
The Doctor is split into three copies due to time distortion, as Azure reveals that she and Swarm plan to engineer the Flux into a vehicle of constant universal destruction. Yaz, Dan, Jericho, and Williamson travel to 2021 and meet Kate Stewart and the second copy, who tells Claire and Jericho to infiltrate the Sontarans and takes her TARDIS from Kate. The third crashes Bel's ship into the Sontaran command. The Sontarans remove the third copy, whom the second rescues, and commit genocide against the Lupari. They offer an alliance with the Cybermen and Daleks, a ruse to sacrifice them to the Flux while the Lupari shield protects the Sontarans. Claire escapes the Sontarans; Jericho cannot. The two copies rescue Vinder and Diane, and reform the Lupari shield behind the Sontarans, leaving the Flux to consume the Sontarans, Jericho, Daleks and Cybermen, and be absorbed by the Passenger. Azure and Swarm bring the first copy to Atropos to sacrifice her to Time, but Time destroys the duo and reunifies the Doctor, telling her to beware the forces that mass against her, and their master. Using the tunnel doors, Kate and Vinder maroon the Grand Serpent on a small asteroid. Vinder and Bel decide to travel with Karvanista. Diane refuses Dan's date offer, as the Doctor invites Dan to join her and Yaz. She deposits her lost memories deep into the TARDIS interior.

== Casting ==
The series is the third to feature Jodie Whittaker as the Thirteenth Doctor. Mandip Gill also returns as Yasmin Khan. Following the departures of Bradley Walsh and Tosin Cole in "Revolution of the Daleks" (2021), John Bishop joined the cast for the series as Dan Lewis.

Jacob Anderson appears in a recurring role as Vinder. Jo Martin returned as the Fugitive Doctor in "Once, Upon Time", having last appeared in the twelfth series episodes "Fugitive of the Judoon" and "The Timeless Children" (2020). Additionally Jemma Redgrave reprises her role as Kate Stewart, a recurring character alongside the Eleventh and Twelfth Doctors, who was last seen in "The Zygon Invasion" / "The Zygon Inversion" (2015). Also appearing in recurring roles throughout the series are Thaddea Graham as Vinder's paramour Bel, Craige Els as the Lupari Karvanista, Rochenda Sandall and Sam Spruell as the villainous Ravagers Azure and Swarm, Annabel Scholey as Claire, and Kevin McNally as Professor Jericho.

Other guest actors in the series include Craig Parkinson as the Grand Serpent, Sara Powell as Mary Seacole, Gerald Kyd as General Logan, Penelope Ann McGhie as Mrs Hayward, Steve Oram as Joseph Williamson, Nadia Albina as Diane, Jonathan Watson as Commander Riskaw and Skaak, and Paul Broughton as Neville.

== Production ==
=== Development ===
The thirteenth series had entered development by November 2019, before the twelfth series premiered. In December of the same year, the ScreenSkills initiative announced an opportunity for an emerging writer to get a bursary and develop a spec script for an episode of the series, though with no guarantee of it eventually entering production. However, due to the COVID-19 pandemic's impact on television, the series' production included only eight episodes. This was reduced from the previous eleven, with six episodes designated to the thirteenth series and an additional two specials airing the following year (as well as the BBC centenary special "The Power of the Doctor"). Chibnall said that there were times when they thought they would be unable to do the show under COVID conditions, and because the only other alternative was "tiny little episodes in one room, with no monsters", they decided to do the biggest story they had done in their time on the series.

Chibnall would also later reveal on the Radio Free Skaro podcast that the series only narrowly escaped cancellation, with him and Whittaker turning down other job offers to make it work; he stated that there were times when the series was not going to be made and even one hour, at the least, when the series had effectively been axed.

The last episode of the three associated specials, which aired in 2022, would be Whittaker and Chibnall's last as star and executive producer respectively, with both Whittaker and Chibnall announcing their intention to leave the programme in July 2021, near the end of filming. Chibnall stated that both he and Whittaker had originally agreed to only do three series, and that "now our shift is done, and we're handing back the Tardis keys". Series composer Segun Akinola also left, saying that he planned to leave alongside the pair.

=== Writing ===
In April 2020, Chibnall confirmed that writing for the series had commenced and continued remotely throughout the COVID-19 pandemic. Chibnall wrote all six episodes of the completed series, co-writing the fourth episode with Maxine Alderton. Alderton, who had previously written for the twelfth series episode "The Haunting of Villa Diodati", was originally scheduled to be a major writer for the series, with Ed Hime and Pete McTighe, both of whom had written for the eleventh and twelfth series, also writing episodes. Series newcomer Inua Ellams was additionally involved during the earlier remote stage of writing. However, Chibnall later told Doctor Who Magazine that though they originally had some great writers scheduled, with the series changing into one single serial with fewer episodes, the plans were greatly changed to minimize turnaround. McTighe and Ellams would eventually return to write episodes for the fifteenth series, following Chibnall's departure.

Whittaker stated that in the series, the Doctor is "faced with a temptation of delving into the mysteries of her past", because "it's hard to go forward, if you don't know where you have come from". She stated that the series has labyrinthine layers, with the revelations spread out, as well as epic dramatic levels. She also liked working with recurring aliens such as the Ood, the Sontarans, and especially the Weeping Angels.

Chibnall stated that he wondered if people would expect that the series would begin with a sequence in a single room; he decided to open big by doing the "biggest action-effects sequence the show has ever done". He decided to start the sequence in medias res, to imply that Yaz and the Doctor have had many adventures since the end of the previous series. He also stated that he wanted to use more "studio-based spectacular set-pieces", to fill the lack of exotic locations due to COVID. The sequence was a combination of green-screen mixed with a CGI background, and VFX.

The Cybermen and Daleks also made brief appearances.

=== Filming ===
According to production executive Tracie Simpson, pre-production for the thirteenth series was originally set to begin in June 2020, with filming set for September 2020; however filming only eventually commenced in November 2020, and ran for ten months, even during the time the series trailer was dropped in July 2021 at San Diego Comic-Con. Jamie Magnus Stone directed the first, second, and fourth episodes, and Azhur Saleem directed the third, fifth, and sixth. Filming for the six episodes of the series, along with two of the 2022 specials, had concluded by the end of July 2021.

Stone stated in an interview that directing for the series felt different because of the serialisation and the lockdown. He praised the plan of the serialisation, as it allowed for more ambitious set builds, while reducing the use of interior locations. According to him, COVID presented some "curveballs" as well, due to cases causing crew shuffling, and the need to shoot it single-camera as opposed to multi-camera. He also said that because it was Whittaker's last series, he wanted to "do it justice". Stone also stated in a different interview that having to shoot at, or close to, location, gave the series a different mood, with the harshness of the November and December weather making the battle sequence in episode two feel even more realistic.

Production blocks were arranged as follows:

Block	Episodes	Director	Writer(s)	Producer
1	Episode 1: "The Halloween Apocalypse"	Jamie Magnus Stone	Chris Chibnall	Nikki Wilson
1	Episode 2: "War of the Sontarans"	Jamie Magnus Stone	Chris Chibnall	Nikki Wilson
1	Episode 4: "Village of the Angels"	Jamie Magnus Stone	Chris Chibnall and Maxine Alderton	Nikki Wilson
2	Episode 3: "Once, Upon Time"	Azhur Saleem	Chris Chibnall	Pete Levy
2	Episode 5: "Survivors of the Flux"	Azhur Saleem	Chris Chibnall	Pete Levy
2	Episode 6: "The Vanquishers"	Azhur Saleem	Chris Chibnall	Pete Levy

"Village of the Angels" was filmed separately from the other two episodes in the block, due to a late finalisation of the script.

Speaking to Doctor Who Magazine, Stone and Saleem both stated that they liked working with the "Weeping Angels", because of a reversal which puts editing and negative spaces in the forefront of their terror.

Stone described a trick-shot, involving a mirror in episode four, which he felt really proud of. He filmed Scholey as Claire looking at her double through a mirror, which was moved in that single shot to Claire's face, while a statue was moved by the crew behind her, something they did throughout the episode. Stone stated that it allowed for extra tension, because the Angels moved not only on blinking, but whenever they moved out of focus. Saleem, just like Stone, liked the mirror shot, stating that shooting and witnessing Whittaker and Martin mirroring each other was, despite being "a simple thing", a "joy to witness". He stated that his block of filming lasted for 15 weeks.

=== Music ===
Segun Akinola returned to compose for the thirteenth series making it the third and final series to be scored by Akinola, as he left and was replaced by his predecessor Murray Gold. In an interview with Doctor Who Magazine, Akinola revealed how he had composed the music for series 13. He stated that he knew that working on series 13 would be different due both to COVID and it being serialised.

According to him, for self-contained episodes, the story would have a "beginning, middle and end", which the music needs to convey; Flux forced him to alter his workload- because most of the themes had to be introduced in the beginning, especially the first episode itself. He said he enjoyed making the themes for the new guest stars, and making them fit in the overall 'serial' sound. He explained that since he began working with the show, each series' soundtrack had been an evolution of the previous one, with the serial format leading to an even bigger change.

He explained his creative process: he first composed themes for the series, and for the Doctor and her companions, with each episodic theme distinct and usually centered on the villain of the story. For Flux's serial format, he stated that he had to change it up- the episodic themes were composed to be similar in nature and flow into each other; any difference in the music elements was also emphasised in the series' theme for the episode.

Speaking of Flux in particular, Akinola stated that the changes they made included a greater use of synth, which they also used in a more foregrounded way, and the use of orchestral elements in each and every episode. The social distancing required made him use experiment with his use of string instruments, with a greater use of brass, and the experimental combining of string and audio manipulation. Akinola felt that this helped heighten the "tension and suspense" and helped achieve a larger-scale sound. Akinola himself played the piano, which he featured more, and with a greater spread, which means he usually "pops up" somewhere on the scores.

== Release ==
=== Promotion ===
The series was first promoted at San Diego Comic-Con on 25 July 2021, where the first teaser trailer was released. A second trailer was released on 15 October 2021, during an episode of The Graham Norton Show, with Whittaker appearing.

Throughout October 2021, a Sontaran ship was projected over Liverpool, and the Doctor's "phone number" was released in a promotional message. On 8 October 2021, the social media accounts for Doctor Who went offline. A teaser had been shown beforehand for the previous week on various BBC shows, which showed the Doctor urgently asking, "Can you hear me?" with static and interference obscuring the video. All accounts had been restored by the next day.

Other sources of promotion included images of upcoming guest stars, episodic promos, the Doctor Who Magazine, and interviews with Whittaker.

=== Broadcast ===
The series premiered on 31 October 2021 on BBC One, and aired through 5 December 2021. The six-episode series is collectively referred to under the subtitle Flux. In the United States the series aired the same day on BBC America, while the streaming service AMC+ carried the streaming video on demand rights to new episodes. In Australia episodes were released same-day on ABC iview and broadcast on ABC TV Plus.

In May 2017, it was announced that due to the terms of a deal between BBC Worldwide and SMG Pictures in China, the company has first right of refusal on the purchase for the Chinese market of future series of the programme until and including Series 15. In October 2019, a deal was made between HBO Max and BBC for an additional two series of Doctor Who, including the thirteenth and fourteenth series.

=== Home media ===
On 24 January 2022, the entirety of Series 13 was released on DVD and Blu-ray in Region 2. The release contained supplementary "special features", which included behind-the-scenes footage, the series trailer, a vlog and an audio commentary for the second episode. Releases in Region 1 and Region 4 followed afterwards on 15 February 2022 and 16 March 2022 respectively.

A release collecting all of Whittaker's episodes (including "Twice Upon a Time") was released exclusively for Region 1 following her regeneration and the end of her tenure as the Doctor. The DVD was released on 25 April 2023, and the Blu-ray following on 5 November 2024.

- ^{(D,B)} indicates a simultaneous DVD and Blu-ray release

Series	Story no.	Episode name	Duration	Release date		
Series	Story no.	Episode name	Duration	R2	R4	R1
13	297	Doctor Who – Flux: The Complete Thirteenth Series	3 × 50 min. 1 × 55 min. 2 × 60 min.	24 January 2022^{(D,B)}	16 March 2022^{(D,B)}	15 February 2022^{(D,B)}
11, 12, 13, 2022 specials	277–300	Doctor Who: The Complete Jodie Whittaker Years (DVD includes "Twice Upon a Time")	20 × 50 min. 1 × 55 min. 7 × 60 min. 2 × 65 min. 1 × 70 min. 1 × 90 min.	—N/a	—N/a	25 April 2023^{(D)} 5 November 2024^{(B)}

== Soundtrack ==
30 selected pieces of score from this series as composed by Akinola was released on digital music platforms on 30 September 2022 by Silva Screen Records, and was released on a 3-CD set on 11 November 2022. The physical release of the soundtrack includes twelve selected pieces of score from "Revolution of the Daleks" as the third disc, which were originally released on digital music platforms on 2 January 2021.

Doctor Who: Series 13 – Flux

Soundtrack album by Segun Akinola
- Released: 30 September 2022 (digital release); 11 November 2022 (CD release)
- Recorded: 2022
- Genre: Soundtrack
- Length: 218:38
- Label: Silva Screen Records
- Producer: Segun Akinola

Doctor Who soundtrack chronology
Doctor Who: Series 12 – Revolution of the Daleks (2021)	Doctor Who: Series 13 – Flux (2022)	Doctor Who: Series 13 – The Specials (2022)

All tracks are written by Segun Akinola, except where noted.

Disc 1
No.	Title	Episode	Length
1.	"Series 13 Opening Titles" (Ron Grainer arr. Segun Akinola)	Various episodes	0:41
2.	"A Little Skirmish"	"The Halloween Apocalypse"	3:21
3.	"What Lies Ahead"	″	3:33
4.	"Renewed at Last"	″	5:00
5.	"Must Not Blink"	″	1:51
6.	"Dancing Across Space and Time"	″	8:51
7.	"I Know Where We Are"	"War of the Sontarans"	3:24
8.	"I Will Find You"	″	4:48
9.	"Parlay"	″	8:42
10.	"Short-Term Repair"	″	8:17
11.	"The Other Things"	"Once, Upon Time"	2:04
12.	"When Is This?"	″	7:45
13.	"There Is No Greater Battle"	″	4:19
14.	"All Is Ending"	″	8:45
15.	"I'm Not Giving Up"	″	5:29
Total length:			76:50

Disc 2
No.	Title	Episode	Length
1.	"Rapid Response Unit"	"Village of the Angels"	8:50
2.	"You Are Recalled"	″	7:29
3.	"Village of The Angels End Credits"	″	0:43
4.	"On My Way"	″	3:15
5.	"We Are Conversion"	"Survivors of the Flux"	4:39
6.	"An Incredible Stroke of Luck"	″	4:04
7.	"Where Are We?"	″	6:42
8.	"Fetch Your Dog"	″	6:59
9.	"We Have Everything We Need"	"The Vanquishers"	4:14
10.	"I Can Rend Them All to Dust"	″	2:41
11.	"And Then We Will Play"	″	7:15
12.	"The Ultimate Betrayal"	″	7:22
13.	"Nothing Is Forever"	″	3:03
14.	"Where Would Earth Be Without You?"	″	6:31
15.	"Series 13 End Credits" (Ron Grainer arr. Segun Akinola)	Various episodes	0:51
Total length:			74:38

Disc 3 (Note: CD release only)
No.	Title	Episode	Length
1.	"367 Minutes"	"Revolution of the Daleks"	1:58
2.	"A Cuppa"	″	1:15
3.	"Something Revolutionary"	″	6:48
4.	"Breakout Ball"	″	6:54
5.	"The Clone"	″	6:28
6.	"The Production Line"	″	8:48
7.	"Stability and Security"	″	3:48
8.	"Thank You for Being My Friend"	″	3:52
9.	"Activate"	″	5:51
10.	"The Death Squad"	″	5:59
11.	"Bad Boys"	″	8:10
12.	"Bye Fam"	″	7:19
Total length:			67:10

== Reception ==
=== Ratings ===
The highest viewed episode of the serial was episode 1 "The Halloween Apocalypse" with 5.8 million viewers in its first week, with the lowest being episode 4 "Village of the Angels" with 4.5 million viewers. The average approval rate of the series was 77/100, according to the Appreciation Index, with all episodes scoring in the 70s. The highest scoring being "Village of the Angels" with a 79, and the lowest scoring being "Once, Upon Time" with a 75.

The serial did moderately well, finishing in the top 25 every week, achieving a maximum of being the 8th highest watched show with the eighth episode. In terms of overnight viewership (which were shared by BBC News entertainment correspondent Lizo Mzimba via Twitter), "The Halloween Apocalypse" had about 400,000 less than the series 12 premier "Spyfall", having netted 4.4 million viewers. The other episodes had overnight numbers of 3.5-4 million.

No.	Title	Air date	Overnight ratings	Consolidated ratings		Total viewers (millions)	28-day viewers (millions)	AI	Ref(s)
No.	Title	Air date	Viewers (millions)	Viewers (millions)	Rank	Total viewers (millions)	28-day viewers (millions)	AI	Ref(s)
1	"The Halloween Apocalypse"	31 October 2021	4.43	1.38	8	5.813	6.386	76	
2	"War of the Sontarans"	7 November 2021	3.96	1.17	13	5.127	5.504	77	
3	"Once, Upon Time"	14 November 2021	3.76	0.94	19	4.696	5.230	75	
4	"Village of the Angels"	21 November 2021	3.45	1.12	18	4.572	5.014	79	
5	"Survivors of the Flux"	28 November 2021	3.82	1.01	21	4.833	5.320	77	
6	"The Vanquishers"	5 December 2021	3.58	1.06	23	4.637	5.140	76	

=== Critical reception ===
Doctor Who series 13: Critical reception by episode
Series 13 (2021): Percentage of positive critics' reviews tracked by the website Rotten Tomatoes

Doctor Who's thirteenth series has received positive reviews from critics. Series 13 holds an 82% critic approval rating on online review aggregation site Rotten Tomatoes with an average score of 6/10, based on 52 critic reviews. Metacritic calculated a weighted average score of 68 out of 100 from six reviews, indicating "generally favorable reviews". Some critics found the series to be emblematic of Chibnall's writing quality, and criticised the use of exposition, and many characters and emotional beats as being underutilised.

Some reviewers also felt that the villains were built up as "big bads", but were then easily dispatched in the end; they also mention the Flux, and how it seems no one, including the Doctor, seems to care about the destruction to space and life that has been caused due to its effect. The serial form of the series was also noted, some disliking it and finding it to lack consistency and cohesion, while others felt that it allowed Chibnall to play to his strength of interweaving and writing strong cliffhangers. The feat of filming and releasing the series during the COVID-19 pandemic was also praised by many reviewers.

Chris Allcock, in his review of episode six for Den of Geek states that it's "maddening" that either Chibnall does not care about the aftermath of the Flux, or has mistakenly given us that impression. He characterised the series as containing some of Chibnall's best episodes, but still showing "a total disdain for picking up after itself", something the audience will watch once, laugh, and "forget it as soon as it ends". A.V. Club's Caroline Siede states that even though Chibnall can write "really solid character scenes", they feel secondary due to the overcrowded plot. She felt that Karvanista being a former companion felt devastating, and that the Doctor apologizing to Yaz for keeping things from her the "single best character scene" in Chibnall's time as showrunner. Patrick Mulkern of Radio Times, in his review for episode six, had a favourable view of the series, feeling that the series "chucked everything into the mix." He found the Ravagers to be memorable, with outstanding performances from the actors along with great costuming, masks and make-up. According to him, Flux trod an eventful path- frenetic, but still giving its characters time to develop and breathe.

Huw Fullerton in his series review for Radio Times, felt that it was Chibnall's best run of episodes, with an "all-time classic episode" in "Village of the Angels". He thought the series was a "cohesive, dynamic and entertaining whole" with a "frenetic, breakneck pace". However, he did feel the serial format had some downsides, with few episodes having "a distinct identity", and that though he thinks Flux is the best single series, it "doesn't contain the best episodes". He concluded by saying he found Flux funny and "full of spectacle", with some of the "best guest stars" ever in the show, with Kevin McNally and Craige Els as Jericho and Karvanista in particular. He also said John Bishop's new companion Dan won him over. He gave the series a score of 3/5 stars.

In their ranking of the series of the revived era, both Screen Rant's Edward Cleary and Digital Spy's Morgan Jeffery and Rebecca Cook ranked the series the lowest of the revived era, while considering it Whittaker's best performance as the Doctor. They also felt that the ambition to make the series during the pandemic was "commendable". Cleary thought the series felt anti-climatic and that the ending "doesn't pay off", while Jeffery and Cook criticised the writing and lack of direction, calling it "somewhat incomprehensible".

=== Awards and nominations ===
Year	Award	Category	Nominee(s)	Result	Ref(s)
2022	Critics Choice Super Awards	Best Actress in a Science Fiction/Fantasy Series	Jodie Whittaker	Nominated	
2022	Saturn Awards	Best Fantasy Series: Network or Cable	Doctor Who	Nominated	
2022	TV Quick Awards	Best Family Drama	Doctor Who	Nominated	
