= Fugitive Doctor =

Incarnation of a fictional character from Doctor Who

The Doctor
The Fugitive Doctor
- Doctor Who character
- Jo Martin as the Fugitive Doctor
- First appearance: "Fugitive of the Judoon" (2020)
- Last appearance: "The Story & the Engine" (2025)
- Introduced by: Chris Chibnall
- Portrayed by: Jo Martin

Information
- Appearances: 5 stories (5 episodes)
- Companions: Lee Clayton; Karvanista
- Chronology: Series 12 (2020); Series 13 (2021); Specials (2022); Series 15 (2025)

The Fugitive Doctor (Note: In her first two appearances, the character is credited only as "the Doctor" and is only ever referred to as such within the show. No specific designation was given by the programme's makers. As such, various names are used in other sources, including "Fugitive Doctor", "Ruth Doctor", "Doctor Ruth", "Doctor Martin" and the "Impossible Doctor". She was later credited as the "Fugitive Doctor".) is an incarnation of the Doctor, the protagonist of the British science fiction television series Doctor Who. She is portrayed by Jo Martin, the first black actor to play the Doctor in the main show. The character first appeared in the twelfth series of the programme's revival in "Fugitive of the Judoon" (2020), where she was disguised as a woman named Ruth Clayton in 21st century Gloucester. Eventually, she restores her memories, and it is revealed that Ruth is an incarnation of the Doctor, though her placement in the chronology of the series is initially unclear.

Within the programme's narrative, the Doctor is a Time Lord, from the planet Gallifrey. The Doctor travels in a time-travelling space ship, the TARDIS. Possessing alien physiology, the Doctor, when critically injured, can regenerate into a new body, gaining a new physical appearance and personality. This plot device has allowed a number of actors, both male and female, to portray the Doctor through the decades. Each actor to play the Doctor offers a different take on the Doctor's essential personality. A fugitive, this incarnation of the Doctor is considered to be a more ruthless incarnation, and formerly worked for Time Lord black ops group "The Division", from whom she is now on the run.

This incarnation was conceived by showrunner Chris Chibnall and co-writer Vinay Patel, with the pair coming up with the incarnation late into writing the script of "Fugitive of the Judoon". The Fugitive Doctor was included not only to foreshadow the upcoming "Timeless Child" arc of series 12, but also to act as a surprise twist within "Fugitive of the Judoon". The incarnation would go on to reappear multiple times within the show following her debut.

The Fugitive Doctor received a mostly positive reception from critics, who praised the casting of a black woman as the Doctor and highlighted the performance of Martin. Many fans and critics expressed interest in seeing Martin reprise the role in a larger capacity. Some critics criticised the usage and execution of the character's concept within the series. Martin has expressed interest in continuing to portray the role, and has appeared in several Big Finish Productions audio dramas depicting stories starring the Fugitive Doctor. She has also stated that the role had helped her expand her career prospects, particularly in America.

== Appearances ==
The Fugitive Doctor first appears in the 2020 episode "Fugitive of the Judoon", disguised as human tour guide Ruth Clayton by means of a Chameleon Arch. As Ruth, she lives alongside her "husband" Lee in 21st century Gloucester with Ruth having no knowledge of her true nature. Intergalactic alien police force the Judoon locate her and invade the city, intending to present her to Galifreyan Commander Gat, who plans to return the Doctor to Gallifreyan black ops group the Division after the Doctor fled from them. Lee, companion to the Fugitive Doctor and a fellow Time Lord, directs Ruth to a lighthouse, where her memories are restored. At the same time, the Thirteenth Doctor finds a police box buried in the grounds – Ruth's TARDIS. As they reveal their identities to one another, it transpires that neither Doctor recognises the other, leading to confusion between the pair as they both assumed the other was a future version of herself. After tricking Gat into accidentally killing herself with a malfunctioning gun, the Fugitive Doctor parts with the Thirteenth Doctor acrimoniously.

She reappears briefly in "The Timeless Children", when the Thirteenth Doctor is trapped in the Time Lord storage database the Matrix by the Master. He informs her that she is the Timeless Child, and had lived many lives prior to what she believed to be her first incarnation. In trying to escape and reconcile this knowledge with her identity, she encounters a projection of the Fugitive Doctor. The projection reminds her that she has never previously been defined by her past before disappearing.

The Fugitive Doctor reappears in "Once, Upon Time". In that episode, the Thirteenth Doctor experiences flashbacks to a raid by the Fugitive Doctor on a location known as the Temple of Atropos, where the Fugitive Doctor confronted the Ravagers known as Swarm and Azure. The Thirteenth Doctor learns that the Fugitive Doctor had led a team of Division operatives, including the Lupari officer Karvanista, to capture the two Ravagers and uses her past self's methods as an inspiration to resolve a situation involving the Ravagers in the future.

The Fugitive Doctor reappears in "The Power of the Doctor" as an AI hologram which is used to trick the Master after he has stolen the Doctor's body. The Fugitive Doctor is later seen as a memory of Anansi and his daughter Abena in the Fifteenth Doctor episode, "The Story & the Engine".

=== Spin-off appearances ===
==== Audio ====
On 23 April 2022, Big Finish Productions announced that Jo Martin would reprise her role for The Fugitive Doctor, a series of Doctor Who audio dramas following her incarnation of the Doctor after the events of "Fugitive of the Judoon". Martin would later appear in the Once and Future series of Doctor Who audio dramas.

Producer David Richardson wanted to have audio drama stories depicting the Fugitive Doctor, and discussed with Chibnall about the character's backstory to avoid conflicting with Chibnall's established history for the character. To avoid conflicts between ongoing Big Finish series and the character's backstory, Richardson and his team elected to focus the Fugitive Doctor's audio drama adventures following her time with the Division, and to avoid answering any major questions about who her character is.

===== Comics =====
The character starred in a series of comic strips produced by Titan Publishing Group, which depicted how the incarnation became a fugitive. An action figure depicting the Fugitive Doctor was released in 2024.

==== Circuit Breaker ====
In July 2025, BBC Studios announced that the Fugitive Doctor will feature in a new mixed-media event called Circuit Breaker with Jo Martin reprising her role as the Fugitive Doctor. Author Esmie Jikiemi-Pearson has been confirmed as overseeing the narrative arc, which will span audio dramas, comics, mobile games, novels and other forms of "digital storytelling".

Circuit Breaker began in June 2026 and depicts Osgood (Ingrid Oliver) and her assistant Andrew (Omari Douglas) discovering items appearing in UNIT headquarters that have been removed from the Doctor's timeline. Osgood calls on the Fugitive Doctor, the earliest incarnation known to UNIT (following information from Yaz Khan), to return the items to their proper times and places and neutralise them without interfering with the Doctor's future.

== Conception and development ==
=== Creation and naming ===
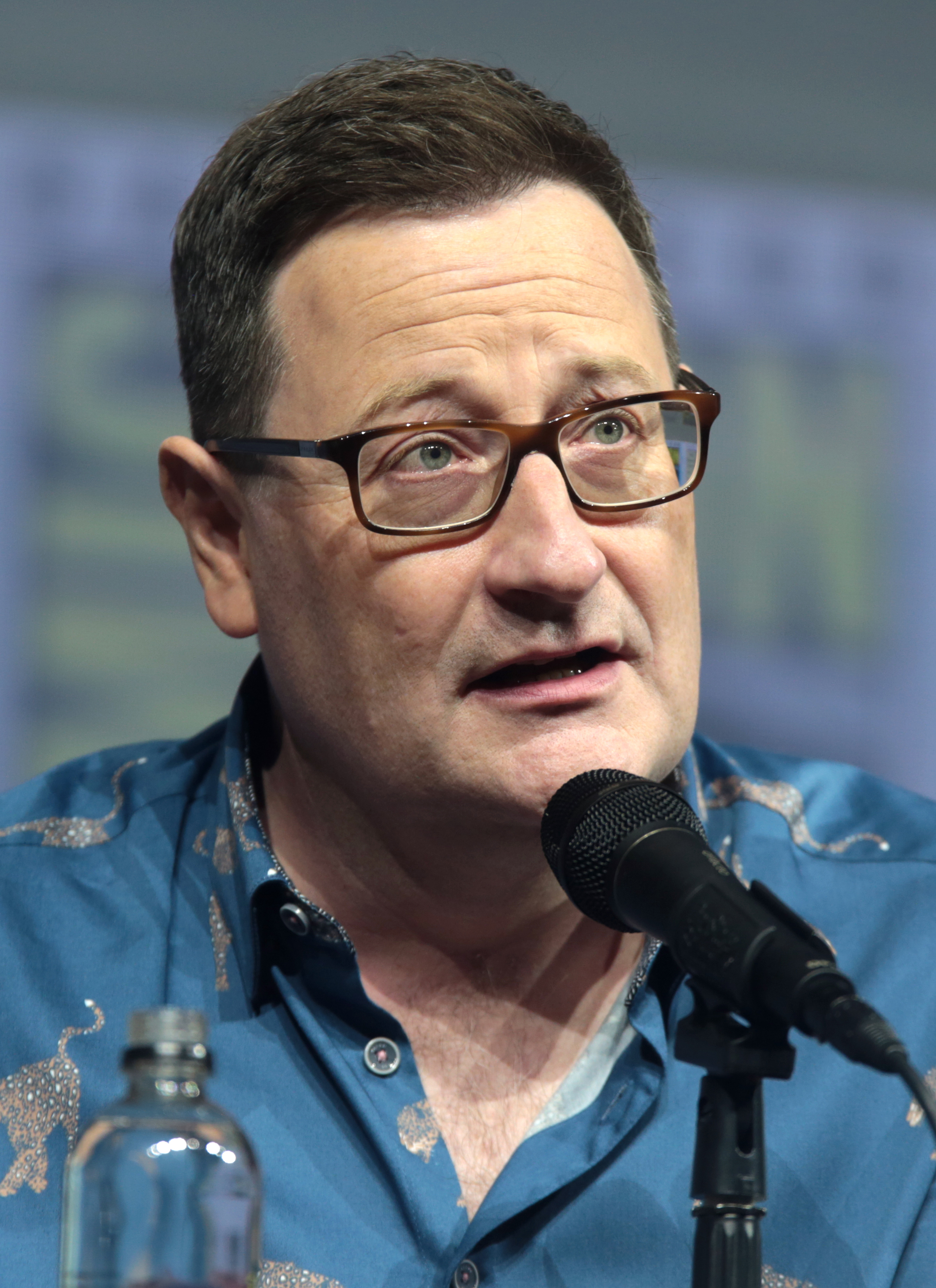
The Fugitive Doctor was conceived by writer and then- showrunner Chris Chibnall (pictured) alongside the co-writer of "Fugitive of the Judoon", Vinay Patel.

The inclusion of the Fugitive Doctor was developed late into the writing process of "Fugitive of the Judoon", with the script lining up to make her inclusion make sense within the episode. Then-showrunner Chris Chibnall and co-writer Vinay Patel developed the idea of the incarnation together, and sought to keep it as much of a secret as possible; the return and on-location shoots of the Judoon were used to distract fans from the presence of the Fugitive Doctor, which website Gizmodo framed as "making sure everybody was too distracted to try and piece it together for themselves."

The character had no distinct name separate from other incarnations of the Doctor, leading to fans giving her various nicknames, such as the "Ruthless Doctor", a play on the character Ruth's name. The name "Fugitive Doctor", named by fans after her debut episode, eventually stuck as the name of the character, with it being used in an official capacity from the episode "Once, Upon Time" onwards. Fans also initially theorised that the character was an incarnation from a parallel universe, but Chibnall disconfirmed this, stating that she was "definitively" an incarnation of the Doctor. Though the incarnation does not lead an entire series of her own, Whittaker stated that the Fugitive incarnation was treated "like any actor taking on the role permanently".

Further appearances of the character were not initially planned for Doctor Who series 13, according to Chibnall, but he said that he would consider it due to how widely popular and accepted the Fugitive Doctor had become within the Doctor Who fanbase. The character would eventually appear in an episode of the series. The character's further cameo re-appearance in series 15 episode "The Story & the Engine" was done as a result of the episode's focus on the Doctor's ethnicity. Showrunner Russell T Davies stated that "it felt like Jo Martin was missing", and that he wanted to "acknowledge her" in the episode to show that the character "still exists".

=== Casting ===
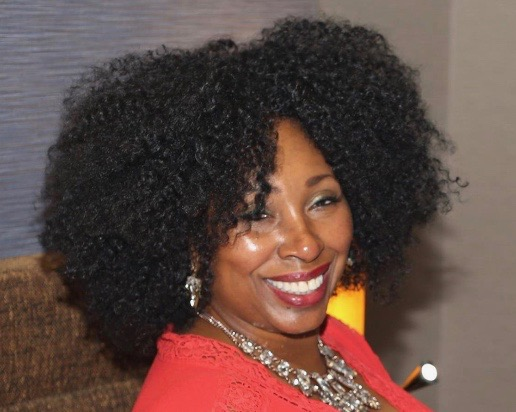
Jo Martin (pictured) portrays the Fugitive Doctor in the character's appearances on-screen.

The Fugitive Doctor is portrayed by actress Jo Martin. It was not announced prior to the broadcast of the character's first appearance in "Fugitive of the Judoon" that a new Doctor would be debuting. Promotional materials credited Jo Martin only as playing Ruth, while the actress herself was not told that she would be playing the Doctor until she was offered the part after her audition. She was then only able to tell her husband about the character's true identity.

Martin had been a fan of the series, having grown up watching Colin Baker's portrayal of the character. Martin's incarnation is the series' first on-screen black Doctor, and additionally the first on-screen black and female Doctor. She is the second woman to portray the Doctor, following Jodie Whittaker's Thirteenth Doctor. As a middle-aged black woman, Martin initially believed that her portraying the Doctor would be incredibly unlikely. She was happy with her casting as she believed it "set the standard" for the series going forward. Martin revealed that she was happy the character was able to act as a black role model for young viewers of the series.

Following her appearances on-screen, Martin stated she was interested in potentially doing a spin-off following her incarnation of the Doctor, and has expressed interest in returning to the series. Martin stated that she "would love to do more audios" alongside potential television appearances. She also stated that she hopes that the Fugitive Doctor's past will be explored more.

=== Characterisation ===
The Fugitive Doctor is a "darker" incarnation of the character, with an "acerbic tongue" and a short temper. She is a battle-hardened figure who does not suffer fools gladly, with an authoritative and composed demeanour who will happily use weapons if necessary. Unlike all other incarnations of the character, Martin's Doctor will readily make use of available weaponry to decisively end conflict. She exhibited this violent streak when she attacked a Judoon, before manipulating a foe into unknowingly killing themselves with it. Her Big Finish characterisation depicts her as having a similar moral compass to other incarnations of the character, however, with her audio drama stories depicting a conflict between her fugitive nature and her desire to help others. Aspects of her character were inspired by Peter Capaldi's Twelfth Doctor, with Martin stating that the Fugitive Doctor has "got an edge and a dark side to her as well as being cheeky and charming. And she doesn't really have a filter."

The character is intended to reference earlier incarnations of the Doctor in order to suggest that she is from the Thirteenth Doctor's past. She declines to use a sonic screwdriver and refers to the TARDIS as her "ship", much like the First Doctor. Chibnall revealed that he intentionally did not wish to confirm where Martin's incarnation was in the timeline, though an infographic published in the official Doctor Who Magazine explicitly places her before the First Doctor and prior to the Doctors seen in The Brain of Morbius. The interior of her TARDIS is also modelled after the set used in the 1960s, with white walls and an identical central console.

=== Costume ===
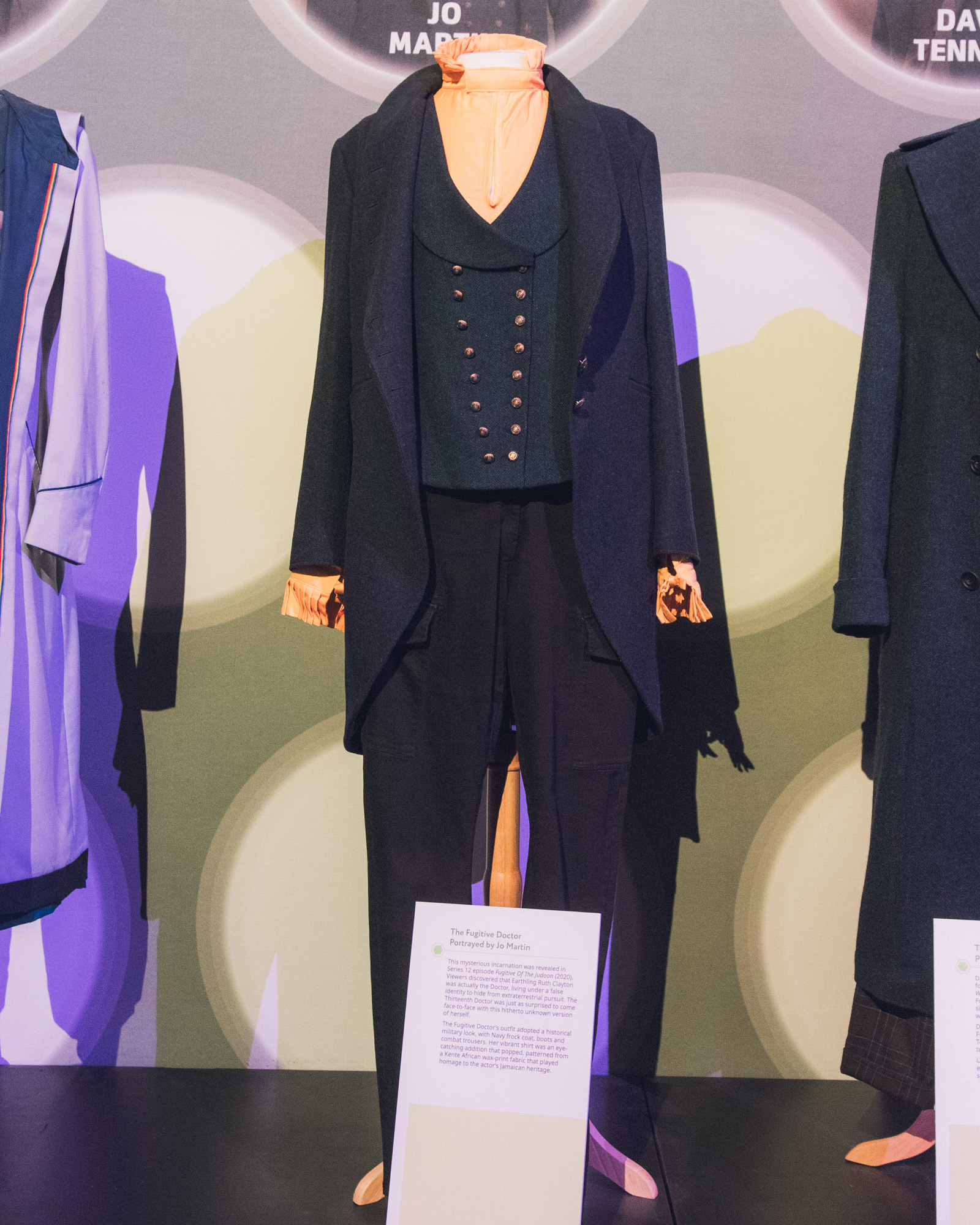
The Fugitive Doctor's costume

The character's costume was designed by Ray Holman to reflect her sterner nature. Black combat trousers and combat boots reference the costume of the Twelfth Doctor, and additionally are meant to indicate the character has experienced combat. She also wears a double-breasted frock coat and waistcoat of dark tweed, with the tweed being included to reference Matt Smith's Eleventh Doctor, who was the first Doctor Holman designed for. The coat is period cut in reference to several "Classic series" (1963–89) Doctors. A brightly coloured poet shirt are used for their contrasting styles, used to represent the character's eccentric personality traits and were made from African Kente cloth as a tribute to the actor's heritage and the significance of her casting. This Doctor has also occasionally worn a pair of yellow sunglasses with this outfit, and sometimes wore a fedora with a kente hatband.

== Reception ==
Jo Martin was cast as the programme's first black Doctor, a milestone which was met with much praise from commentators. Martin stated that she had received many messages from fans across the world who thanked her for portraying the role. Martin explained in an interview with Radio Times that the series had put her "on the map" in America, which "upgraded the kind of jobs" Martin was able to get. Martin's performance was lauded by critics, and several critics and fans have expressed a desire to see the character return on-screen in larger capacities. The character's introduction resulted in large amount of fan art, as well as fan theories about her potential origins and place in the Doctor's wider timeline.

Adi Tantimedh from Bleeding Cool wrote that the Fugitive Doctor had "proven surprisingly popular among fans", which Tantimedh cited as being a result of her "no-nonsense stillness". Olivia Garret from Radio Times praised Martin's performance as the Doctor, similarly writing that Martin's incarnation "encapsulated everything the Doctor should be", highlighting the Fugitive Doctor's harsh yet gentle character. Morgan Jeffrey, in another article for Radio Times, believed that the Fugitive Doctor's introduction broke the series' history of frequently sidelining or killing off notable black supporting characters, and that the character, who was portrayed by a middle-aged black woman, allowed many people to see themselves in the Doctor that many previous actors had not been able to depict before.

Merryana Salem of Junkee criticised the direction of Martin's incarnation, believing that making the only explicit "criminal" of the Doctor's incarnations black invoked harmful stereotypes, while also opining that the introduction of an earlier female Doctor prior to Whittaker undermined Whittaker's own importance within the larger context of the series. Tantimedh, in another article for Bleeding Cool, felt Chibnall failed to capitalise on the Fugitive Doctor, with Tantimedh feeling as though the character was introduced purely for shock value rather than for any tangible expansion within the show itself. Though Tantimedh hoped to see more of the incarnation, she believed that Chibnall "robbed Jo Martin and the show of the fanfare of the first woman of colour to play The Doctor."
