= Jo Martin =

English actress and writer

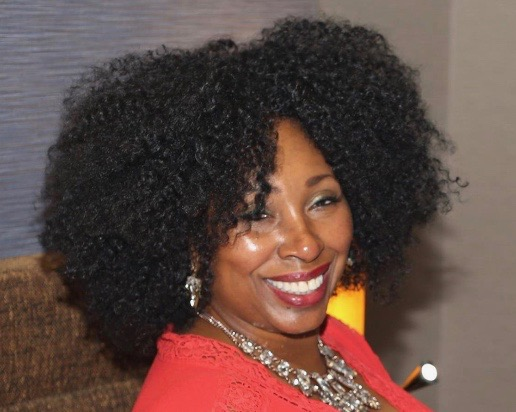
- Martin in 2015
- Born: 29 April; Newham, London, England
- Occupations: Actress and writer
- Years active: 1980s–present
- Notable work: The Crouches; Holby City; Doctor Who

Jo Martin (born 29 April) is an English actress and writer. On television, she is known for her roles in the BBC series The Crouches (2003–2005) as Natalie Crouch, Back to Life (2019–2021) as Janice, Holby City (2019–2022) as Max McGerry, and Doctor Who (2020–2022, 2025) as the Fugitive Doctor, Dreaming Whilst Black (2023) as Grace and The Marlow Murder Club (2024–present) as Suzy Harris.

== Early life ==
Martin was born on 29 April in Newham, London to Jamaican parents. Her parents arrived in the area in the 1950s. She attended Portway Primary School and Plashet All Girls Secondary School. Her mother died on Christmas Day 2015.

== Career ==
=== Doctor Who ===
Martin first appeared in the series 12 episode "Fugitive of the Judoon", playing Ruth Clayton, a tourist guide who is later revealed to be an incarnation of the Doctor, placed before the First Doctor, known as the Fugitive Doctor. Martin's Doctor received positive reviews from critics. She reprised her role in the series finale, "The Timeless Children", in the third chapter of Doctor Who: Flux, "Once, Upon Time", and in the 2022 special "The Power of the Doctor". Martin later returned to the role in a cameo appearance in the 2025 episode "The Story & the Engine".

Martin starred in The Fugitive Doctor Adventures, an audio drama series focused on her character produced by Big Finish.

=== Tales from the Front Line ===
In November 2020, Talawa Theatre Company released Tales from the Front Line. The first film presented a verbatim narrative from a teacher, played by Martin, talking about trying to keep themselves and their pupils safe during the pandemic, the emotional and psychological impact of the global Black Lives Matter movement, and the challenges of supporting students' education during an era of great uncertainty.

Reviews described Martin's performance as "performed so subtly" as to seem real, while being "conversational and natural".

== Filmography ==
=== Film ===
Year	Title	Role	Notes
1988	For Queen and Country	Pearl	
1999	The Murder of Stephen Lawrence	Cheryl Stoley	
2000	The Jolly Boys' Last Stand	Tina	
2003	Cheeky	Zoe	
2004	Tunnel of Love	Education Officer 1	
2005	Batman Begins	Police Prison Official	
2005	Blood	Thelma	Short film
2007	Deadmeat	Melanie	
2007	The Prodigals	Leon's Mother	Short film
2010	4.3.2.1.	Driving Examiner	
2010	Devil's Playground	Scared Person on Street	
2011	Chalet Girl	Lexi	
2012	Say My Name Tercet: Stormy Weather	Mother	Short film
2012	Parking Wars	Victoria	Short film
2015	Dragonfly	Ruby Thomson	
2015	Mm-Hm	Cherie	Short film
2016	100 Streets	Marie	
2018	The Rehearsal Room	Jane	Short film
2018	Been So Long	Vivienne	
2019	Nine Nights	Leonore Haines	
2019	Blue Story	Marco's Mum	
2019	Dominoes for Beginners		
2023	97 Minutes	Toyin	
2024	Hard Truths	Nurse Salon Client	
2026	Resident Evil	Andrea Vasquez	

=== Television ===
Year	Title	Role	Notes
1989–2004	The Bill	Clayton/Cindy/Anne Jennings/Maddie Owen	4 episodes
1990	Birds of a Feather	Joy	1 episode
1991	The Brittas Empire	Mrs Walsh	1 episode
1996	The Real McCoy	Botney/Various roles	Series 5
1996	Chef!	Rochelle	2 episodes
1998	Comedy Nation	Various roles	
2002	Casualty	WDS Bridgeman	2 episodes
2002–2006	Doctors	Anne Charlton	2 episodes
2003	Loose Women	As Herself	1 episode
2003	My Family	1970s Nurse	1 episode
2003–2005	The Crouches	Natalie Crouch	Series regular
2005	Black Out	Celia Jackson	TV film
2006–2007	Stupid!	Various roles	10 episodes
2007	The Prodigals	Leon's Mother	
2010	Holby City	Sandra Minster	1 episode
2013	Wizards vs Aliens	Elizabeth Hatcher	1 episode
2014	EastEnders	Judy	
2014	Hollyoaks	Petula Delaney	3 episodes
2015	Together	Anne Griffin	2 episodes
2015	Emmerdale	Neurosurgeon	1 episode
2016	Still Open All Hours	Registrar	1 episode
2016	Jonathan Creek	Nina	1 episode
2016	NW	Saul Dibb	TV film
2018	The Long Song	Hannah	2 episodes
2019	Silent Witness	Grace Taylor	2 episodes
2019	Fleabag	Pam	1 episode
2019–2021	Back to Life	Janice	Regular, 9 episodes
2019–2020	In the Long Run	Yvonne	2 episodes
2019–2022	Holby City	Max McGerry	Regular role
2020	Casualty	Max McGerry	1 episode
2020	Small Axe	Mrs Bartholemew	Episode: Education
2020	Liar	Receptionist	1 episode
2020–2022, 2025	Doctor Who	Fugitive Doctor	5 episodes
2022	The Flatshare	Pauline	3 episodes
2022	Whitstable Pearl	Dawn Castle	1 episode
2022	Death in Paradise	Rakesha Lorde	1 episode
2023	Black Ops	Julie	4 episodes
2023	Dreaming Whilst Black	Grace	Regular, 5 episodes
2023	Champion	Dawn	7 episodes
2023	Still Up	Angela	Episode: "The Date"
2023	Mrs Sidhu Investigates	Nora	Episode: "On the Ropes"
2023	Grime Kids	Bernice	
2024	Midsomer Murders	Denise Bantrig	Episode: "A Grain of Truth"
2024–present	The Marlow Murder Club	Suzie Harris	Main role
2025	Missing You	Tessie Sewell	4 episodes
2025	The Sandman	Gryphon (voice)	Episode: "Long Live the King"

=== Audio drama ===
Year	Title		Role	Notes	Ref.
2024	Doctor Who: Once and Future	Coda - The Final Act	Fugitive Doctor		
2025	Doctor Who: The Fugitive Doctor Adventures	Most Wanted	Fugitive Doctor		
2025	Doctor Who: The Fugitive Doctor Adventures	Dead or Alive	Fugitive Doctor		
2026	Doctor Who: Rutans vs Sontarans	Betrayal at the House of Sontar	Fugitive Doctor		
2026	Doctor Who: Circuit Breaker	Full Circuit	Fugitive Doctor		

=== Audiobooks ===
Year	Title	Role	Notes	Ref.
2026	Doctor Who: Circuit Breaker: The Deadliest Weapon	Narrator		

=== Video ===
Year	Title	Role	Notes
2021	Doctor Who: Time Fracture	Fugitive Doctor	Pre-recorded video in theatre play

=== Web ===
Year	Title	Role	Notes	Ref.
2020	The Doctors Say Thank You	Herself		

== Bibliography ==
Year	Title	ISBN	Notes
2026	Doctor Who: Circuit Breaker: The Kaleidoscope	ISBN 9781911743101	
