= Once, Upon Time =

297c – "Once, Upon Time"
- Doctor Who episode

Cast
- Doctor: Jodie Whittaker – Thirteenth Doctor
- Companions: Mandip Gill – Yasmin Khan; John Bishop – Dan Lewis
- Others: Thaddea Graham – Bel; Rochenda Sandall – Azure; Sam Spruell – Swarm; Jacob Anderson – Vinder; Nadia Albina – Diane; Jo Martin – Fugitive Doctor; Steve Oram – Joseph Williamson; Craig Parkinson – Grand Serpent; Bhavnisha Parmar – Sonya Khan; Matthew Needham – Old Swarm; Craige Els – Karvanista; Barbara Flynn – Awsok; Jonny Mathers – Passenger; Chantelle Pierre – Police Officer; Nicholas Briggs – Voice of the Cybermen; Amanda Drew – Voice of the Mouri; Nigel Lambert – Priest Triangle

Production
- Directed by: Azhur Saleem
- Written by: Chris Chibnall
- Produced by: Pete Levy
- Executive producer(s): Chris Chibnall; Matt Strevens; Nikki Wilson
- Music by: Segun Akinola
- Series: Series 13
- Running time: 3rd of 6-part story, 49 minutes
- First broadcast: 14 November 2021

Chronology
← Preceded by "War of the Sontarans"	Followed by → "Village of the Angels"

"Once, Upon Time", prefixed frequently with either "Chapter Three" or "Flux", is the third episode of the thirteenth series of the British science fiction television programme Doctor Who, and of the six-episode serial known collectively as Doctor Who: Flux. It was first broadcast on BBC One on 14 November 2021. It was written by showrunner and executive producer Chris Chibnall, and directed by Azhur Saleem.

The episode stars Jodie Whittaker as the Thirteenth Doctor, alongside Mandip Gill and John Bishop as her companions, Yasmin Khan and Dan Lewis, respectively.

== Plot ==
With humanity now on the verge of extinction, the Daleks, Cybermen, and Sontarans occupy most of the remaining planets. In the Temple of Atropos, the Doctor jumps into the time storm and stalls Swarm by hiding Dan, Yaz, and Vinder in their pasts.

Dan experiences his date with his love interest Diane, until the Doctor appears as a hologram and Swarm's companion Passenger abducts Diane. Yaz talks with her police partner and tries to teach her sister a video game, but sees the Doctor instead. Vinder reluctantly relives his time assisting the dictatorial Grand Serpent and his demotion to a remote outpost upon revealing the Serpent's misdeeds, with Yaz as his superior and the Doctor as a hologram. Vinder makes video messages aboard the outpost.

Bel, a survivor of the Flux, evades the Daleks in a forest, finds a Lupari ship and weapons, and escapes to the Cybermen sector. Bel kills a boarding party, then confesses her motivations to the last Cyberman she kills: she is searching for her lover, Vinder. Bel finds Vinder’s messages, and comforts their unborn child.

The Doctor jumps into her own timestream and recovers memories of her past Fugitive Doctor incarnation and three other Division officers, including the Lupari officer Karvanista, raiding the Temple to confront Swarm and Azure. Swarm appears in his original form and has vessels called Passengers each storing hundreds of thousands of life essences. The Fugitive Doctor has secretly hidden six powerful Mouri priests inside, and unleashes them.

Back in her present, the Doctor finds the priests and encourages them to return to the temple, but the priests forcibly separate her from her past memories to protect her from the time storm's effects. Awsok, a mysterious old entity, chides the Doctor, claiming the Doctor's mission is futile. Awsok reveals the Flux was deliberately created and placed and is the Doctor's fault.

The Doctor returns Yaz, Dan and Vinder to the present. Azure reveals they knew what the Doctor would do and brought her to Atropos on purpose. Swarm reveals Diane's entrapment in Passenger, and the Doctor and Vinder promise to help Dan get her back before Swarm, Azure and Passenger leave the temple. The Doctor uses the TARDIS to return Vinder to his ravaged home planet and gives him a device to contact her. After taking off, a Weeping Angel jumps out of Yaz's phone and seizes the TARDIS console.

== Production ==
=== Development ===
"Once, Upon Time" was written by showrunner and executive producer Chris Chibnall.

=== Casting ===
The series is the third to feature Jodie Whittaker as the Thirteenth Doctor, and Mandip Gill as Yasmin Khan, with John Bishop having joined the cast for the series as Dan Lewis. The episode featured a guest appearance from Craig Parkinson. Jo Martin also returned as the Fugitive Doctor; her appearance was unannounced prior to the episode's broadcast. Additional guest stars for the episode were announced on 4 November.

=== Filming ===
Azhur Saleem directed the second block, which comprised the third, fifth and sixth episodes of the series.

== Broadcast and reception ==
Professional ratings
Aggregate scores
Source	Rating
Rotten Tomatoes (Tomatometer)	75%
Rotten Tomatoes (Average Score)	7.2/10
Review scores
Source	Rating
Radio Times	2/5 stars
The A.V. Club	B
The Independent	2/5 stars
The Telegraph	4/5 stars

=== Broadcast ===
"Once, Upon Time" aired on 14 November 2021. The episode serves as the third part of a six-part story, entitled Flux.

=== Ratings ===
Overnight the episode was watched by 3.76 million viewers; it was the fourth most-watched programme of the day only behind Strictly Come Dancing, Top Gear, and Countryfile. The consolidated rating counting all views across all platforms within seven days of broadcast was 4.67 million. The episode was the sixth highest rated programme on BBC1 for the week, but across all channels, it was the fifth highest for the day and failed to make the top fifteen programmes for the week. The episode received an Audience Appreciation Index score of 75.

=== Critical reception ===
On Rotten Tomatoes, a review aggregator website, 6 of 8 critics gave the episode a positive review, with an average rating of 7.2 out of 10. Patrick Mulkern, a reviewer for Radio Times, stated that the episode was "one of the most dizzying and blatantly confusing episodes of Doctor Who." The Independent's Isobel Lewis agreed, calling it a "meaningless mess", but said there were some "hopeful moments" among the "bewildering plotlines." Meanwhile, Michael Hogan with The Telegraph disagreed, believing that the "disorienting" and "woozy, trippy narrative" of the episode was the overall goal and that it was "jam-packed with treats for the fans." Caroline Siede similarly praised the episode writing that "one of the things “Once, Upon Time” does best is evoke a dream-like sense of confusion".
