= Ascension of the Cybermen =

295a – "Ascension of the Cybermen"
- Doctor Who episode

Cast
- Doctor: Jodie Whittaker – Thirteenth Doctor
- Companions: Bradley Walsh – Graham O'Brien; Tosin Cole – Ryan Sinclair; Mandip Gill – Yasmin Khan
- Others: Sacha Dhawan – The Master; Patrick O'Kane – Ashad; Julie Graham – Ravio; Ian McElhinney – Ko Sharmus; Alex Austin – Yedlarmi; Steve Toussaint – Feekat; Rhiannon Clements – Bescot; Matt Carver – Ethan; Jack Osborn – Fuskle; Evan McCabe – Brendan; Branwell Donaghey – Patrick; Orla O'Rourke – Meg; Andrew Macklin – Michael; Coalyn Byrne – Sergeant; Nicholas Briggs – Voice of the Cybermen; Matthew Rohman, Simon Carew, Jon Davey, Richard Highgate, Richard Price, Mickey Lewis, Matthew Doman, Paul Bailey – Cybermen

Production
- Directed by: Jamie Magnus Stone
- Written by: Chris Chibnall
- Produced by: Nikki Wilson
- Executive producers: Chris Chibnall; Matt Strevens
- Music by: Segun Akinola
- Series: Series 12
- Running time: 1st of 2-part story, 49 minutes
- First broadcast: 23 February 2020

Chronology
← Preceded by "The Haunting of Villa Diodati"	Followed by → "The Timeless Children"

"Ascension of the Cybermen" is the ninth and penultimate episode of the twelfth series of the British science fiction television programme Doctor Who, first broadcast on BBC One on 23 February 2020. It was written by Chris Chibnall, and directed by Jamie Magnus Stone. It is the first of a two-part story; the concluding episode "The Timeless Children", the finale of the twelfth series, aired on 1 March.

The episode features Jodie Whittaker as the Thirteenth Doctor as she deals with the aftermath of her actions in "The Haunting of Villa Diodati". When the Doctor becomes separated from her companions Graham O'Brien, Ryan Sinclair, and Yasmin Khan - portrayed by Bradley Walsh, Tosin Cole, and Mandip Gill respectively - the team must face the consequence of the deadly Cyber-Wars, banding together with the last humans as they defend themselves from the Cybermen and search for a way out.

The episode was watched by 4.99 million viewers, and received positive reviews from critics.

== Plot ==
In rural Ireland during the early 20th century, a young couple find and adopt an abandoned baby, Brendan, who grows up to be a police officer. On an early assignment, he is shot and falls off a cliff during a confrontation with a criminal, but miraculously survives unscathed. Years later, on the day he retires, he meets his adoptive father and mentor, neither of whom have aged, and they wipe his memory.

In the far future, the last of humanity is hiding from the last of the Cybermen, who have hunted them almost to extinction. As a pair of Cybershuttles arrive overhead, the Doctor and her companions arrive and attempt but fail to protect them, and some of the humans are killed. The Doctor orders her companions to leave with the remaining humans on their ship, and get to safety, but Ryan and another human named Ethan are separated by the Cybermen's only partially cyberconverted leader, Ashad. Ryan and Ethan escape to assist the Doctor in hijacking one of the Cybershuttles, but the Cybermen pursue in another Cybershuttle.

In deep space, Yaz, Graham, and the other three humans, Yedlarmi, Ravio and Bescot, discover that they are travelling through a battlefield surrounded by dead Cybermen. They board an abandoned Cybercarrier, a large Cyberman ship, which they believe can take them to "Ko Sharmus", a haven which is supposedly home to the Boundary, a portal that sends humans to the other side of the universe where they cannot easily be followed by the Cybermen. Graham and Ravio investigate and discover the Cybercarrier holds thousands of fresh Cybermen warriors in stasis just as Ashad and his crew dock their shuttle.

The Doctor, Ryan, and Ethan arrive on the planet where Ko Sharmus is. They discover that Ko Sharmus is a person who helped other humans through the Boundary but remained behind as a ferryman in case others had survived. He takes them to the Boundary, and a portal opens. Ashad and the Cybermen begin drilling into the warriors and resurrecting them, while Graham and Ravio return to the control deck. Ashad leads the warriors to the control deck as Yaz manages to contact the Doctor, warning her that the ship is almost there, but it is carrying numerous warriors.

The Doctor watches in horror, as the other side of the portal reveals the ruined Gallifrey, much to everyone's confusion. The Master leaps through, exclaiming that the Doctor should be afraid because everything is about to change forever.

== Production ==
=== Development ===
"Ascension of the Cybermen" was written by Chris Chibnall. Further episode details were announced in Doctor Who Magazine #548 in early February 2020.

=== Casting ===
Julie Graham was cast as Ravio in the episode. Ian McElhinney and Steve Toussaint guest star in the two-part finale, "Ascension of the Cybermen" / "The Timeless Children".

=== Filming ===
Jamie Magnus Stone directed the fifth block, consisting of the ninth and tenth episodes.

Bradley Walsh who plays Graham said that the "Ascension of the Cybermen" was his favourite episode to film. “This episode by a country mile is my favourite", he remarked in a behind-the-scenes video. "It was like making a real blockbuster movie”.

== Broadcast and reception ==
Professional ratings
Aggregate scores
Source	Rating
Rotten Tomatoes (Tomatometer)	93%
Rotten Tomatoes (Average Score)	7.3/10
Review scores
Source	Rating
The A.V. Club	B
Entertainment Weekly	B+
Metro	4.5/5 stars
Radio Times	4/5 stars
The Independent	4/5 stars
The Telegraph	4/5 stars

=== Television ===
"Ascension of the Cybermen" aired on 23 February 2020. It is the first of a two-part story; the concluding episode "The Timeless Children", the finale of the twelfth series, aired on 1 March.

=== Ratings ===
"Ascension of the Cybermen" was watched by 3.71 million viewers overnight, making it the eighth most watched programme for the day in the United Kingdom. The episode had an Audience Appreciation Index score of 81. The episode received an official total of 4.99 million viewers across all UK channels and was the 25th most watched programme of the week.

=== Critical reception ===
The episode received a 93% approval, and an average rating of 7.3/10, on the review aggregate site Rotten Tomatoes, based on 13 reviews from critics. The consensus on the website reads, "'Ascension of the Cybermen' expertly builds on last week's momentum, setting the stage for what should be an epic season finale."
