= The Halloween Apocalypse =

297a – "The Halloween Apocalypse"
- Doctor Who episode

Cast
- Doctor: Jodie Whittaker – Thirteenth Doctor
- Companions: Mandip Gill – Yasmin Khan; John Bishop – Dan Lewis
- Others: Craige Els – Karvanista; Steve Oram – Joseph Williamson; Nadia Albina – Diane; Sam Spruell – Swarm; Rochenda Sandall – Azure/Anna; Jacob Anderson – Vinder; Annabel Scholey – Claire; Jonathan Watson – Ritskaw; Dan Starkey – Kragar; Matthew Needham – Old Swarm; Sarah Amankwah – En Sentac; Charlie Oscar – K–Toscs; Richard Tate – Wilder; Paul Leonard – James Stonehouse; Heather Bleasdale – Wilma; John May – Kev; Gunnar Cauthery – Jón; Barbara Fadden – Weeping Angel

Production
- Directed by: Jamie Magnus Stone
- Written by: Chris Chibnall
- Produced by: Nikki Wilson
- Executive producers: Chris Chibnall; Matt Strevens; Nikki Wilson
- Music by: Segun Akinola
- Series: Series 13
- Running time: 1st of 6-part story, 50 minutes
- First broadcast: 31 October 2021

Chronology
← Preceded by "Revolution of the Daleks"	Followed by → "War of the Sontarans"

"The Halloween Apocalypse", prefixed frequently with either "Chapter One" or "Flux", is the premiere episode of the thirteenth series of the British science fiction television programme Doctor Who, and the first part of the six-episode serial known collectively as Doctor Who: Flux. It was first broadcast on BBC One on 31 October 2021. It was written by showrunner and executive producer Chris Chibnall, and directed by Jamie Magnus Stone.

The episode stars Jodie Whittaker as the Thirteenth Doctor, Mandip Gill as Yasmin Khan, and John Bishop as new companion Dan Lewis. The episode features the return of the Sontarans and Weeping Angels. It received generally positive reviews, although some criticism was directed towards the pacing.

== Plot ==
The Doctor and Yaz are in pursuit of Karvanista, one of the dog-like Lupari species, for reasons unclear to Yaz. They escape from his capture and follow him to Earth in the TARDIS. En route, the Doctor experiences a psychic vision of Swarm, a mysterious being, escaping from its millennia-long imprisonment by the Division.

In present day Liverpool, Dan Lewis arranges a date with museum worker Diane before attending a shift at the soup kitchen and heading home. Karvanista breaks into his house and transports him onto his Lupari ship. The Doctor and Yaz arrive after Dan's abduction, investigating his house and discovering what appears to be a Lupari invasion fleet approaching Earth. They escape just before Dan's house is collapsed by a trap set by Karvanista. They then briefly encounter Claire, a woman who claims to have met the Doctor in the latter's future. Departing, the Doctor and Yaz are confused by the appearance of a second doorway in the TARDIS' console room. Claire is subsequently captured by a Weeping Angel.

On Karvanista’s ship, Yaz rescues Dan while the Doctor confronts Karvanista over his connection to the Division. Karvanista reveals that the Lupari are in fact saving humanity from Earth’s imminent destruction by the Flux, an unknown entity that defies all laws of space and time and consumes everything in its path. The Doctor, Yaz and Dan escape the ship and return to the TARDIS (where another doorway has appeared) to investigate the Flux.

Meanwhile, the Flux causes Vinder, the sole crew member of a remote outpost in deep space, to evacuate his position. It also catches the attention of the Sontarans, who relish the prospect of destruction it poses. Swarm attacks a base in the Arctic Circle, killing one of its two crew members and reviving his "sister" Azure from the other. Azure later lures Diane into a derelict house.

The TARDIS takes the group to an area of space where they observe the Flux from a distance. The Doctor experiences another vision of Swarm, who claims an old association with her. The Flux then accelerates its attack on Earth, before the Lupari fleet can rescue its population. The Doctor has Karvanista form a defensive shield with the other Lupari ships, protecting Earth from the Flux. However, the TARDIS is unable to transport behind the shield. The TARDIS' three doorways fly open as the Flux approaches.

== Production ==
=== Development ===
"The Halloween Apocalypse" was written by showrunner and executive producer Chris Chibnall. The story featured the return of the show's recurring aliens, the Sontarans and the Weeping Angels.

=== Casting ===
The series is the third to feature Jodie Whittaker as the Thirteenth Doctor. Mandip Gill also returns as Yasmin Khan. John Bishop joined the cast for the series as Dan Lewis. Guest actors within the episode include Annabel Scholey, Rochenda Sandall, Sam Spruell, Craige Els, Steve Oram, Nadia Albina, and Jonathan Watson.

=== Filming ===
Jamie Magnus Stone, who directed four episodes of the previous series, directed the first block, which comprised the first, second and fourth episodes of the series. Filming was originally set to begin in September 2020, but eventually commenced in November 2020 due to the COVID-19 pandemic's impact on television.

== Broadcast and reception ==
Professional ratings
Aggregate scores
Source	Rating
Rotten Tomatoes (Tomatometer)	77%
Rotten Tomatoes (Average Score)	6.8/10
Review scores
Source	Rating
Evening Standard	3/5 stars
Radio Times	4/5 stars
The A.V. Club	B
The Independent	3/5 stars
The Telegraph	3/5 stars

=== Broadcast ===
"The Halloween Apocalypse" aired on 31 October 2021. The episode serves as the first part of a six-part story, entitled Flux. In the United States the episode aired on BBC America at the same time as its broadcast on BBC One. An "extended cut" of the episode aired on BBC America later that day featuring an additional two minutes of content that had been edited out of the initial broadcast to allow for television advertisements.

=== Ratings ===
"The Halloween Apocalypse" was watched by 4.43 million viewers overnight and a 26.9% share, making it the second most watched programme for the night in the United Kingdom. The episode received an Audience Appreciation Index score of 76. Within seven days the total number of viewers rose to 5.81 million ranking as the ninth most viewed program for the week. The original BBC America broadcast of the episode was watched live by 339,000 viewers, while its later evening broadcast was seen by 277,000.

=== Critical reception ===
On review aggregator Rotten Tomatoes, 77% of 13 critics gave the episode a positive review, and an average rating of 6.8/10. The site's consensus reads, "Setting a crowded table for this season of Doctor Who, 'The Halloween Apocalypse' is an ambitious opener that should leave fans feeling optimistic."
