= Jamie Magnus Stone =

Scottish director and animator

- Born: 15 December 1985 (age 40)
- Other name: Jamie Stone
- Education: Leith School of Art; Edinburgh College of Art; National Film and Television School
- Occupations: Director, animator
- Mother: Sally Magnusson
- Relatives: Magnus Magnusson (grandfather); Mamie Baird (grandmother); Jon Magnusson (uncle)

Jamie Magnus Stone (born 15 December 1985) is a Scottish film director and animator, who studied at the National Film and Television School. He is the son of Sally Magnusson and grandson of Magnus Magnusson and Mamie Baird.

== Career ==
Stone attended Leith School of Art and has contributed to an alumni show there.

Stone studied film and television at the Edinburgh College of Art where he made his first films; Flights, about an old man and his flight of stairs, and the Scottish BAFTA nominated Fritz about a German Spy who lives under a boy's bed. Whilst directing fiction films, he also developed his skills in sand animation and won the MacLaren Award at the Edinburgh Film Festival and Best Animation at BAFTA Scotland in 2008 for his series of Three Minute Wonders, The World According To, produced by Anders Jedenfors.

Stone enrolled at the National Film and Television School in 2010. He was interviewed by The Guardian in 2010 after making his first year film, Far Removed.

In August 2014, Stone was nominated for a BAFTA for his short film Orbit Ever After.

In November 2019, Stone was announced as one of the directors for the twelfth series of Doctor Who. He directed two filming blocks, consisting of four episodes, including "Spyfall, Part 1", "Praxeus", "Ascension of the Cybermen", and "The Timeless Children". Stone returned to direct for the thirteenth series, with the episodes "The Halloween Apocalypse", "War of the Sontarans", and "Village of the Angels", as well as "The Power of the Doctor", the final episode in a trio of subsequent specials.

In May 2022, the BBC and STAN commissioned a new series to be directed by Stone, Ten Pound Poms, a drama about the British citizens who migrated to Australia after the Second World War, with filming commencing in Australia shortly after.
