= The Timeless Children =

295b – "The Timeless Children"
- Doctor Who episode

Cast
- Doctor: Jodie Whittaker – Thirteenth Doctor
- Companions: Bradley Walsh – Graham O'Brien; Tosin Cole – Ryan Sinclair; Mandip Gill – Yasmin Khan
- Others: Sacha Dhawan – The Master; Patrick O'Kane – Ashad; Ian McElhinney – Ko Sharmus; Julie Graham – Ravio; Alex Austin – Yedlarmi; Matt Carver – Ethan; Rhiannon Clements – Bescot; Seylan Baxter – Tecteun; Kirsty Besterman – Solpado; Paul Kasey – Judoon Captain; Nicholas Briggs – Voice of Cybermen and Judoon Captain; Matthew Rohman, Simon Carew, Jon Davey, Richard Highgate, Richard Price, Mickey Lewis, Matthew Doman, Paul Bailey – Cybermen; Jo Martin – The Fugitive Doctor

Production
- Directed by: Jamie Magnus Stone
- Written by: Chris Chibnall
- Produced by: Nikki Wilson
- Executive producers: Chris Chibnall; Matt Strevens
- Music by: Segun Akinola
- Series: Series 12
- Running time: 2nd of 2-part story, 65 minutes
- First broadcast: 1 March 2020

Chronology
← Preceded by "Ascension of the Cybermen"	Followed by → "Revolution of the Daleks"

"The Timeless Children" is the tenth and final episode of the twelfth series of the British science fiction television programme Doctor Who, first broadcast on BBC One on 1 March 2020. It was written by Chris Chibnall, and directed by Jamie Magnus Stone. It is the second of a two-part story; the previous episode, "Ascension of the Cybermen", aired on 23 February.

The episode stars Jodie Whittaker as the Thirteenth Doctor, alongside Bradley Walsh, Tosin Cole, and Mandip Gill as her companions, Graham O'Brien, Ryan Sinclair and Yasmin Khan, respectively. The episode also stars Sacha Dhawan as the Master.

The episode was watched by 4.69 million viewers and received mixed reviews from critics.

== Plot ==
The Master persuades the Doctor to join him on Gallifrey, where he forces her to enter the Matrix. He shows her the secret history of Gallifrey and its native Shobogans. Tecteun, a space explorer, found a "timeless child" with the capacity to regenerate. She adopted the child and studied her, successfully grafting her regeneration capacity into the Shobogans, transforming them into Time Lords; they chose to limit a Time Lord's regenerations to twelve. The Master reveals that the Doctor is the "timeless child." Tecteun and the child were inducted into a clandestine organisation called the Division, the details of which were redacted from the Matrix. The Doctor's memories were subsequently erased, prior to the childhood she remembers; only snippets remain, masked as the story of the Irish Garda Brendan.

With the Doctor trapped in the Matrix, the Master lures Ashad to Gallifrey and shrinks him with his tissue compression eliminator, taking the Cyberium. With its knowledge and the bodies of the Time Lords he had killed on his arrival to Gallifrey, the Master creates a race of regenerating Cybermen, aiming to use them to take over the universe. In the Matrix, a vision of the Fugitive Doctor restores the Doctor's belief in herself. The Doctor escapes by overloading the Matrix with all of her memories from her past incarnations.

On board the Cyber-carrier, Bescot is killed, while Yaz and Graham successfully hide from the invading Cybermen in empty Cyber-armor. They subsequently save the lives of Ryan, Ethan, and Ko Sharmus from Cybermen forces sent to the planet by Ashad. The group gather and agree to go through the portal to Gallifrey.

The Doctor regroups with her companions, and discovers Ashad's miniaturized body contains a "Death Particle" capable of destroying all organic life on a planet. The Doctor and her friends blow up the Cyber-carrier, destroying Ashad's army in the process and foiling his plot to rebuild the Cyber-Empire. Finding a TARDIS, she programs it to take her allies home. The Doctor takes one of Ko Sharmus' explosives to set off the particle. She is unable to trigger it when goaded by the Master, but Ko Sharmus appears and takes it, as penance for failing to suitably hide the Cyberium. The Doctor escapes in another TARDIS as the explosion consumes Gallifrey, as the Master escapes with his CyberMasters.

The Doctor's allies arrive on contemporary Earth in their TARDIS. The Doctor lands the other TARDIS near her own, but as she prepares to take off, she is arrested by the Judoon and teleported to a prison located inside an asteroid.

=== Continuity ===
As the Doctor broadcasts her memories to escape the Matrix, numerous clips from both the classic and revived series appear, featuring each Doctor as well as several companions and villains. Notably the flashback includes images from The Brain of Morbius, a Fourth Doctor serial. In that story, while the Doctor and Morbius are hooked to a machine during a battle of wits, the machine briefly flashed up the former regenerations of the Doctor and eight additional faces, implied to be incarnations that precede the First Doctor. Their inclusion in this episode identifies them as incarnations of the timeless child.

== Production ==
=== Development ===
"The Timeless Children" was written by Chris Chibnall. Further episode details were announced in Doctor Who Magazine #548 in early February 2020.

=== Casting ===
Julie Graham was cast as Ravio in the episode. Ian McElhinney and Steve Toussaint were announced as guest stars in the two-part finale, "Ascension of the Cybermen" / "The Timeless Children"; however, Toussaint did not appear in this episode after his character was killed in the events of "Ascension of the Cybermen". Jo Martin reprises her role from "Fugitive of the Judoon" as an incarnation of the Doctor.

=== Filming ===
Jamie Magnus Stone directed the fifth block, consisting of the ninth and tenth episodes.

== Broadcast and reception ==
Professional ratings
Aggregate scores
Source	Rating
Rotten Tomatoes (Tomatometer)	71%
Rotten Tomatoes (Average Score)	6.33/10
Review scores
Source	Rating
The A.V. Club	B
Entertainment Weekly	B+
Metro	4/5 stars
Radio Times	2/5 stars
The Independent	3/5 stars
The Telegraph	3/5 stars

=== Television ===
"The Timeless Children" aired on 1 March 2020. It is the second of a two-part story; the previous episode, "Ascension of the Cybermen", aired on 23 February.

=== Ratings ===
"The Timeless Children" was watched by 3.78 million viewers overnight, making it the seventh most watched programme for the day in the United Kingdom. The episode had an Audience Appreciation Index score of 82. The episode received an official total of 4.69 million viewers across all UK channels and was the 30th most-watched programme of the week. It was the lowest-rated episode of the show since its revival in 2005 after "The Eaters of Light" in 2017.

=== Critical reception ===
The episode received a 71% approval, and an average rating of 6.33/10, on the review aggregate site Rotten Tomatoes, based on 14 reviews from critics. The consensus on the website reads, "Its relentless plotting and exposition teeter on overwhelming, but a bold daringness to reinvent Whovian lore coupled with Jodie Whittaker's dynamic performance make 'The Timeless Children' a successful season finale."

The Guardian gave the episode four out of five stars, praising Whittaker's "visceral" performance and deeming that the "finale takes audacious flights, rewriting Doctor Who lore to extravagant degrees, creating an alternative backstory for the creation of Gallifrey and a completely new backstory for the Doctor." In a review for The Daily Telegraph, Michael Hogan praised the expanded roles of Graham, Ryan and Yaz, but felt the revelation was as confusing for the Doctor as it was for audiences, writing it was "the sort of "timey-wimey, wibbly-wobbly" narrative tricksiness" that former showrunner Steven Moffat had been criticised for.

Conversely, Patrick Mulkern of Radio Times said, while he could accept there being more incarnations before the First Doctor, he felt their origin story did "not make for involving television". He expressed various criticisms of the episode, calling it overall an "awful, boring mess", and concluded that the show "deserves – and indeed needs – a lengthy rest". Caroline Siede of The A.V. Club similarly criticised several aspects of the episode, including the portrayal of Whittaker's Doctor as "a passive character". She also commented negatively on the "exposition-heavy pep talk" from the Fugitive Doctor, and said the episode's conclusion "doesn’t feel earned on either a character level or a plot one", criticizing the last-minute reveal that Ko Sharmus was part of the group that sent the Cyberium back in time and said the episode "undercuts the big heroic moment where the Doctor decides not to lower herself to the Master’s level of violence by having her happily accept that same amount of carnage so long as Ko Sharmus is the one pulling the trigger. Doctor Who has never been super consistent about the Doctor’s willingness to resort to violence, but the morality whiplash here is pretty unforgivable." She cited a lack of proper character development for Yaz. She felt it left "the biggest questions unanswered". Devan Coggan of Entertainment Weekly thought it "a bold reveal" that the Doctor had lived numerous lives before the First Doctor, and praised Whittaker and Dhawan's performances, but criticised the reveal that the Doctor had previously been a woman as undermining Whittaker's significance as the first female incarnation and thought that the Cybermen decked out in Timelord capes and regalia was "rather silly", and felt "a few other characters and plot points get lost in all the big revelations."

Andrew Cartmel, a former Doctor Who script editor during the 1980s, was quoted as believing the episode "depletes the mystery" of Doctor Who stating "there’s a lot of detail in specifics, which is the last thing you want. Number one: it depletes the mystery, and number two: that was the chief failing of the Moffat era". Cartmel had previously planned to tease a backstory for the Doctor during his time on the show, dubbed the Cartmel Masterplan. Steven Moffat defended the reveal of the Doctor's origins, and felt that the Second Doctor episode The Power of the Daleks implied the character had regenerated more than once before. The revelation that the Doctor had lived previous lives was negatively received by many fans and critics. According to Screen Rant's Craig Elvy, many called the storyline "an insult to William Hartnell's First Doctor". It proved divisive among Doctor Who fans, so much so that the BBC put out a press statement in response to the complaints it received, stating “we understand that some people will feel attached to a particular idea they have of the Doctor, or that they enjoy certain aspects of the programme more than others. Opinions are strong and this is indicative of the imaginative hold that Doctor Who has – that so many people engage with it on so many different levels. We wholeheartedly support the creative freedom of the writers and we feel that creating an origin story is a staple of science fiction writing. What was written does not alter the flow of stories from William Hartnell’s brilliant Doctor onwards”.
