= Thaddea Graham =

Northern Irish actress

- Born: 29 March 1997 (age 29); Changsha, China
- Education: Arts Educational Schools (BA)
- Occupation: Actress
- Years active: 2014–present
- Known for: The Letter for the King; Curfew; The Irregulars

Thaddea Graham (born 29 March 1997) is a Northern Irish actress. On television, she is known for her roles in the Sky One series Curfew (2019), the Netflix series The Letter for the King (2020), The Irregulars (2021) and Sex Education (2023), the BBC series Us (2020), Doctor Who (2021) and Wreck (2022), and the Apple TV+ series Bad Sisters (2024) and Margo's Got Money Troubles (2026). Her films include After the Hunt (2025).

Graham appeared on the 2023 Screen International Rising Stars Ireland list.

== Early life and education ==
Graham was adopted from an orphanage in Changsha, China at one year old and was raised in County Down. She was one of the first international adoptees in Northern Ireland. Graham attended Killinchy Primary School in Killinchy and later Bloomfield Collegiate School in Ballyhackamore. She trained with Arts Educational School in London, graduating with a Bachelor of Arts in Acting in 2018.

== Career ==
Graham made her television debut with a recurring role in season 3 of The Sparticle Mystery. In December 2018, she landed her first major role as Iona in the 2020 Netflix fantasy series The Letter for the King, an adaptation of the classic Dutch book by Tonke Dragt. The following December, she was cast as Bea in the 2021 Sherlock Holmes spinoff The Irregulars, also on Netflix. In the meantime, she played Hanmei Collins in the Sky One action series Curfew, and Kat in the BBC One comedy-drama miniseries Us. She joined the cast of Doctor Who for its thirteenth series (known as Doctor Who: Flux) as Bel, making her debut in "Chapter Three: Once, Upon Time".

In 2022, Graham was in the main cast of the Virgin Media One and ITV crime drama Redemption as Siobhán Wilson and began starring as Vivian Lim opposite Oscar Kennedy and Jack Rowan in the BBC Three horror comedy Wreck. She joined the cast of the Netflix comedy-drama Sex Education for its fourth season playing the character "O".

In 2024, Graham was announced as part of the cast of Margo's Got Money Troubles created by David E. Kelley.

== Filmography ==
Key
†	Denotes films that have not yet been released

=== Film ===
Year	Title	Role	Notes
2014	Painkiller		Short film
2021	VHS	Lea	Short film
2022	Ballywalter	Frances	
2025	Jay Kelly	Meg	
2025	After the Hunt	Katie	
2026	Artificial †	TBA	Post-production
TBA	Hello & Paris †	TBA	Filming

=== Television ===
Year	Title	Role	Notes
2015	The Sparticle Mystery	Lucie	3 episodes
2015	Dani's Castle	Atka	Episode: "Groundbog Day"
2019	Curfew	Hanmei Collins	Main cast
2020	The Letter for the King	Iona	Main cast
2020	Us	Kat	Miniseries, main cast
2021	The Irregulars	Bea	Main cast
2021	Doctor Who	Bel	3 episodes
2022	Redemption	Siobhán Wilson	Miniseries, main cast
2022–2024	Wreck	Vivian Lim	Main cast
2023	Sex Education	Sarah 'O' Owens	Main cast (series 4)
2024	DNA Journey	Herself – Narrator	3 episodes
2024	Bad Sisters	DI Una Houlihan	Main cast (series 2)
2026	Margo's Got Money Troubles	Susie	Main cast

=== Video games ===
Year	Title	Role	Notes
2022	Sifu	Fighter (voice)	
2023	Dead Island 2	Jessie (voice)	

== Stage ==
Year	Title	Role	Notes
2016	London Stories Made by Migrants		Battersea Arts Centre

== Awards and nominations ==
Year	Award	Category	Work	Result	Ref.
2025	Edinburgh International Television Festival	Breakthrough Performance		Nominated	
