= Weeping Angel =

Fictional villain in Doctor Who

- Doctor Who race
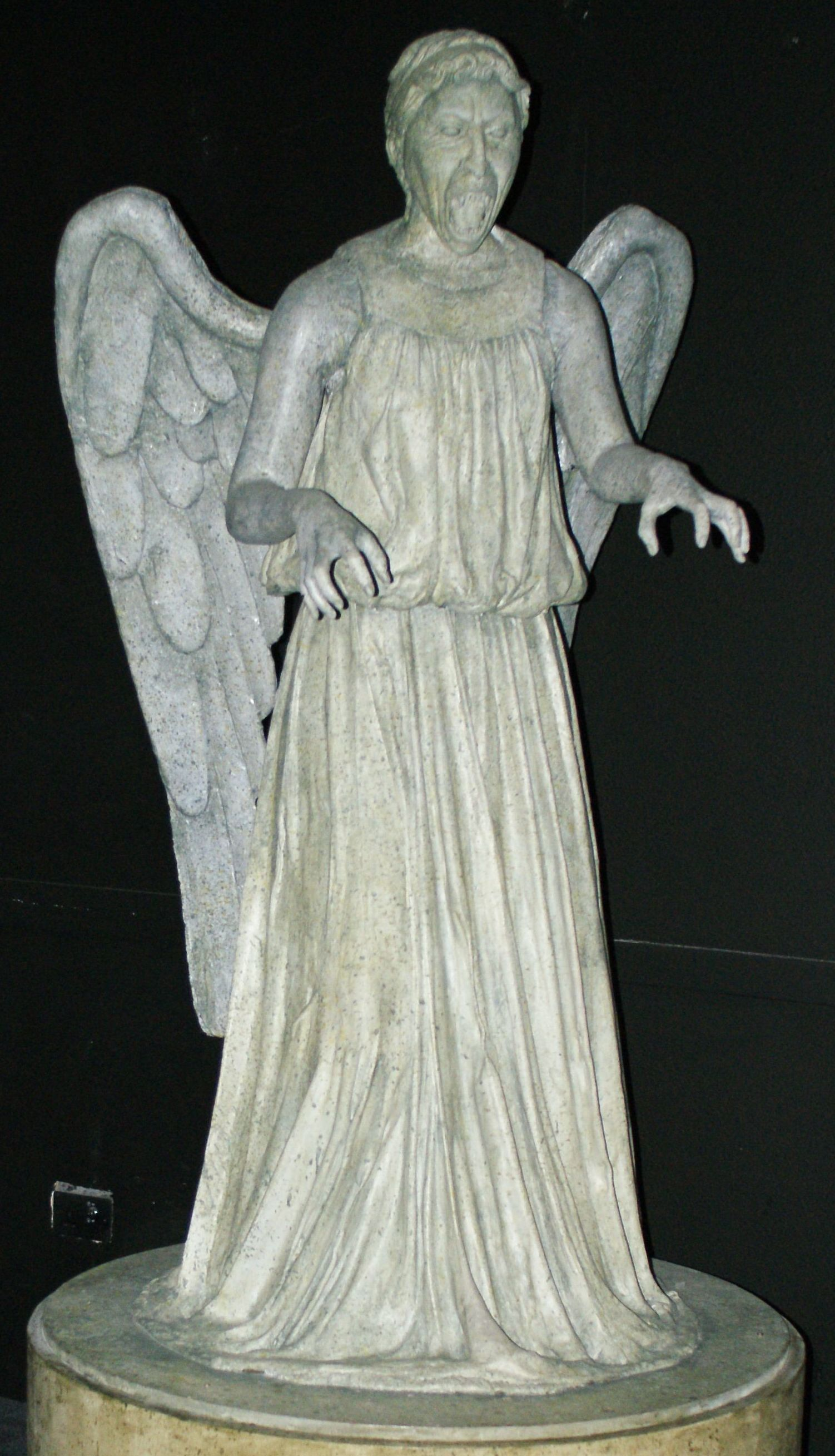
- A hostile Weeping Angel as displayed in 2008
- First appearance: "Blink" (2007)
- Created by: Steven Moffat

In-universe information
- Other name: The Lonely Assassins
- Home world: Unknown

The Weeping Angels are a race of fictional predatory alien creatures from the long-running British science fiction television series Doctor Who. The Weeping Angels look like stone statues to an observer since they only can move when unobserved. Weeping Angels feast by touching a victim; the victim is sent back in time, and the Angel feeds on the resulting time energy from the time travel caused. The Weeping Angels were introduced in the 2007 episode "Blink" and became recurring characters across a variety of Doctor Who media. These later episodes expand the Angels' list of abilities, which include the ability for an image of an Angel to become another Weeping Angel, the ability to turn other statues into Weeping Angels, and the ability to kill others by touching them twice.

The Angels were created by writer Steven Moffat. Moffat was inspired by a variety of sources, including an encounter with a statue of a crying angel in a graveyard, which had mysteriously disappeared when he returned to view it at a later date. The Weeping Angels are portrayed by actresses who portray the Angels physically, with freeze frames being used to make the Angels appear entirely still in the final product. The Weeping Angels were planned to act as the overarching, main antagonists of the spin-off series Class; however, due to the series's cancellation, this never came to fruition.

Since their initial appearance, the Weeping Angels have been repeatedly nominated as one of the most popular and frightening Doctor Who monsters. They have been praised for their concept and fear factor, but have been criticized for the expansion of their abilities and their overexposure across Doctor Who media. They have been significantly analyzed since their debut. The computer hacking tool Weeping Angel, which was leaked as part of Vault 7, is named after the Angels.

== Description ==
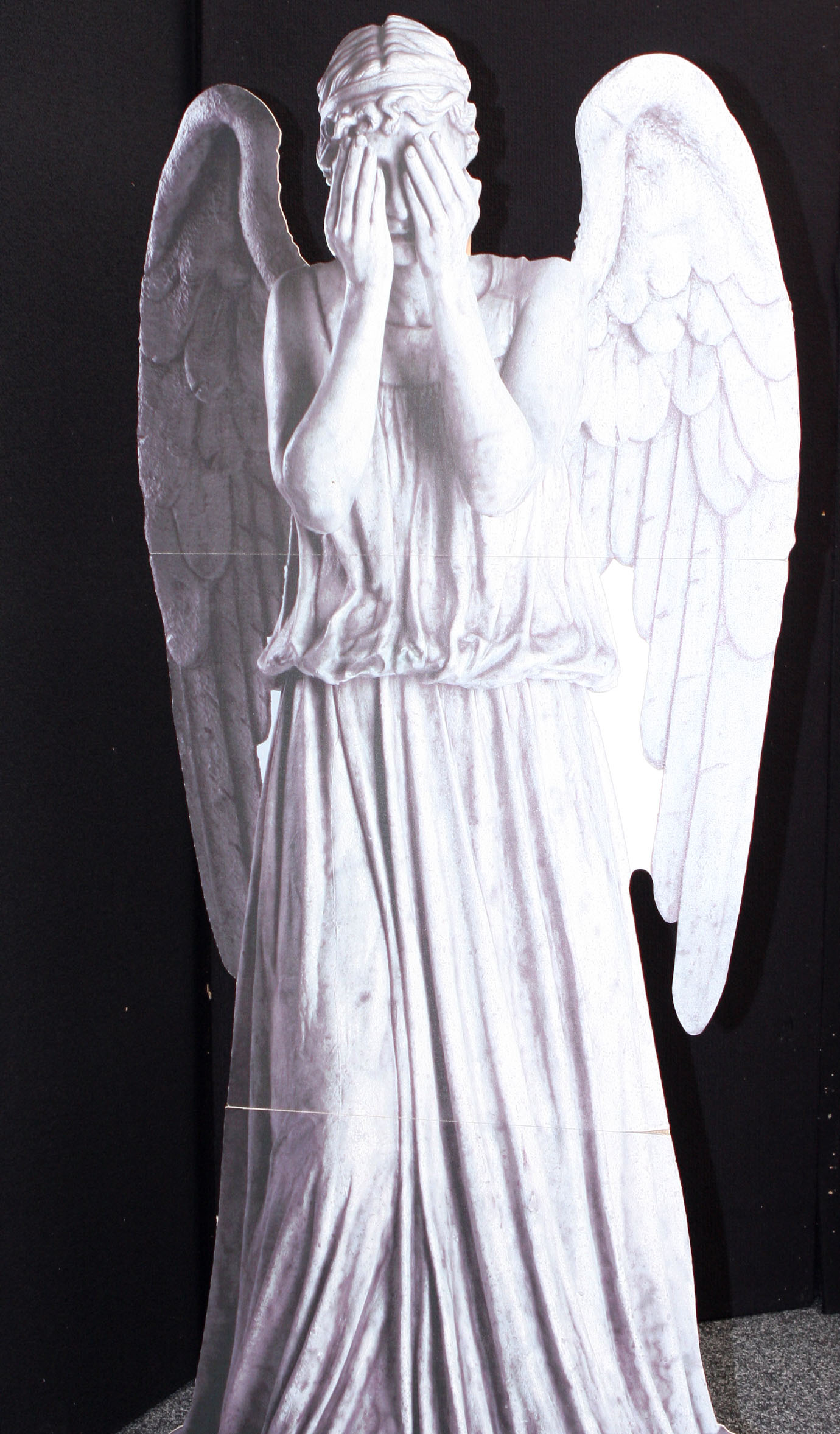
A depiction of how the Angels appear when non-hostile, as displayed at the 2014 Sydney Oz Comic Con

The Weeping Angels are a race of aliens that feed off temporal energy. They obtain this energy by touching their victims and sending them back in time, feeding on the energy caused by the resultant time travel. The Angels can only move when unobserved since they are "quantum-locked".

The Weeping Angels role in the series has varied. When first introduced in the Doctor Who episode "Blink" they are initially portrayed as scavengers who are merely acting out to survive and who act independently of each other, but later episodes depict the Angels in more organized roles. Later appearances also add more abilities to the Angels, including the ability for an image of a Weeping Angel to become another Weeping Angel, the ability for Angels to convert statues into other Weeping Angels, and the ability for Angels to snap someone's neck and use their vocal cords to communicate.

The episode "Village of the Angels" adds many more abilities, including the ability to direct where in time a person is sent, the ability to kill a victim by touching them twice, the ability to communicate telepathically, and the ability to turn other lifeforms into Angels to allow them to be transported. Their appearances in Flux depict them as working for an external organization, depicting them for the first time having organized motivations beyond survival. A smaller version of Weeping Angels, known as Cherubs, appear in later appearances as well.

== Appearances ==
The Weeping Angels first appear in the 2007 episode "Blink". In the episode, they have sent the Tenth Doctor and Martha Jones back in time, separating the Doctor from his time machine known as the TARDIS. The Angels intend to harness the TARDIS for food, but the Doctor is able to place messages for a woman named Sally Sparrow to find in the future, which guide her to stopping the Angels. The TARDIS returns to the past for the Doctor, and the Angels are trapped within each other's vision, rendering them unable to move.

The Angels reappear in the 2010 two-part episode "The Time of Angels" and "Flesh and Stone". An Angel is held aboard a ship known as the Byzantium, which crashes into a planet. The Eleventh Doctor, Amy Pond, River Song, and a group of militant clerics enter the wreckage to recover the Angel, but the clerics are picked off by the Angel. An Angel is able to enter Amy's mind through a video recording and threatens to take form using the image left in her brain. It is revealed that the Angel crashed the ship into a large maze containing a large number of dormant Weeping Angels, which are revived by the power that is contained within the ship. A "crack in time" begins to expand aboard the ship, which the Angels feast on, but soon begin to flee from as the crack expands. The Doctor is able to trick the Angels into falling into the crack, erasing them, including the Angel in Amy's head, from existence.

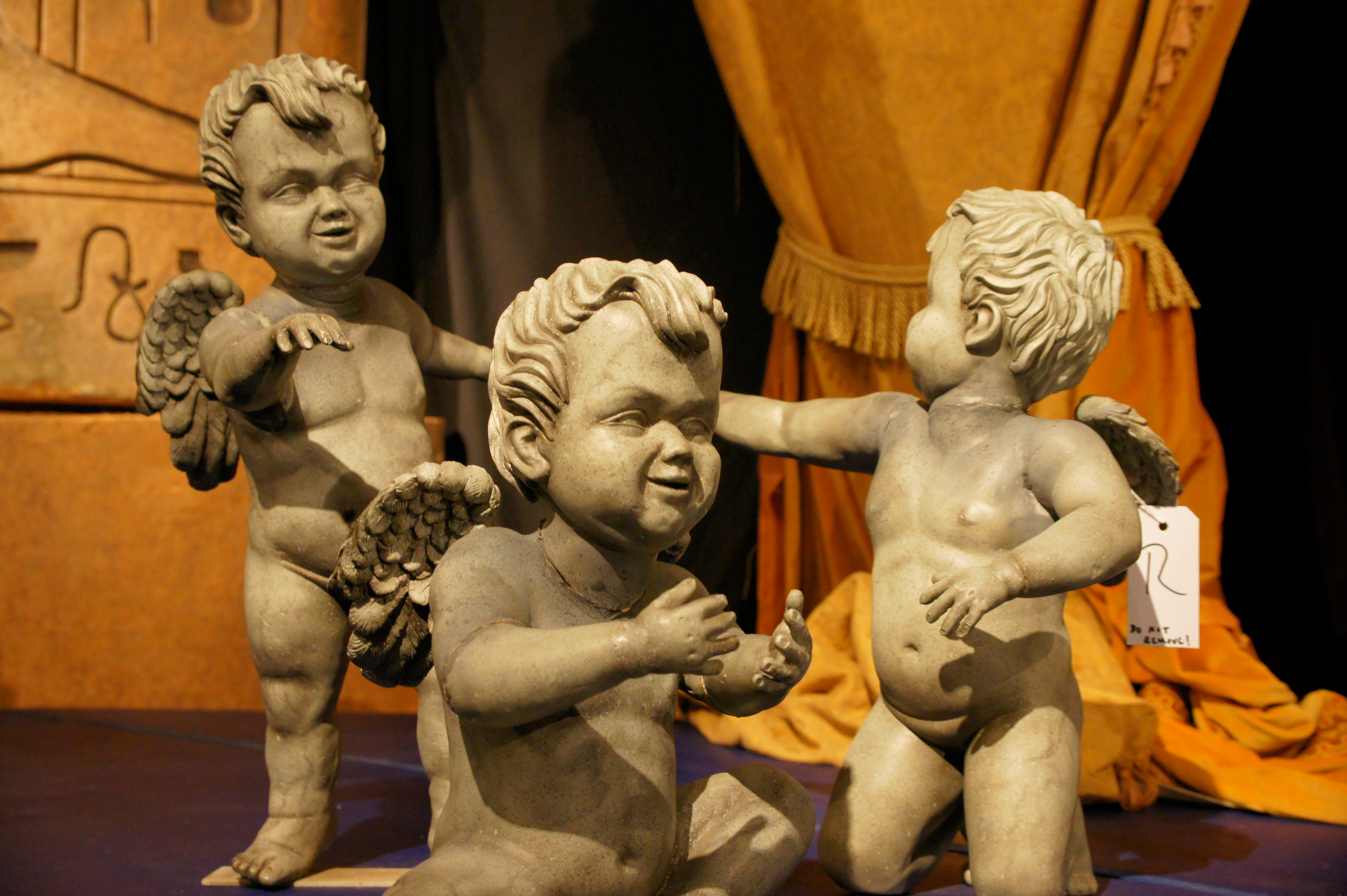
The Cherub angels, shown at the Doctor Who Experience

The Angels make a cameo appearance in the 2011 episode "The God Complex", in which they are found in a room of the hotel in which the episode is set, as they are one of the characters' biggest fears.

The Angels reappear in the 2012 episode "The Angels Take Manhattan". The Angels infiltrate Manhattan and set up a "battery farm" by creating an endless time loop of people entering a hotel and dying, with the resulting energy being feasted on by the Angels. Amy and her husband Rory Williams are able to break the time loop, eliminating the Angels' presence from New York, but a lone straggler sends Amy and Rory back in time, with the paradoxes caused by the time loop making the Doctor unable to go back and retrieve them. Following this, the Angels appear in various cameo roles, such as in the episodes "The Time of the Doctor", "Hell Bent", and "Revolution of the Daleks". The Angels also briefly appear in the finale episode of the spin-off series Class, where they are revealed to have masterminded events behind the scenes.

The Angels return in Doctor Who series 13, also known as Flux. In the series, an Angel appears in the TARDIS control room, and pilots the ship to a small village. The village becomes assailed by Angels, who are attempting to recapture Claire, a woman they had previously hunted in the episode "The Halloween Apocalypse". It is revealed that an Angel is housed in Claire's mind, and it is attempting to escape the mysterious organization known as "the Division", of which the other Angels are members. The Thirteenth Doctor offers to help the Angel in exchange for information regarding the Division and her past, but the Angel betrays the Doctor for the other Angels, as it had been promised freedom in exchange for handing over the Doctor to the Division. The Doctor is turned into an Angel and transported to the Division base, after which the Angels leave.

=== In other media ===
The Weeping Angels appear in spin-off media. 2019 virtual reality game Doctor Who: The Edge of Time features Angels as a gameplay element. 2021 Mobile game Doctor Who: The Lonely Assassins depicts the Angels from "Blink" attempting to get their revenge following the episode's events. The game takes the form of a "found phone" game, with players needing to go through supporting character Larry Nightingale's phone to solve the mystery of his disappearance and stop the Angels. A 2022 board game, titled Doctor Who: Don't Blink features the Angels, with the goal of other players being to complete repairs to the TARDIS before the player controlling the Angels is able to stop them. The Angels are also depicted in several easter egg and cameo roles in other video games, such as Call of Duty: Black Ops III, Lego Dimensions, and The Witcher 3: Wild Hunt. The Angels also appear in comics and audio dramas. Weeping Angel merchandise has been produced, such as toys, statuettes, costumes, cards and full-size statues.

== Development and creation ==
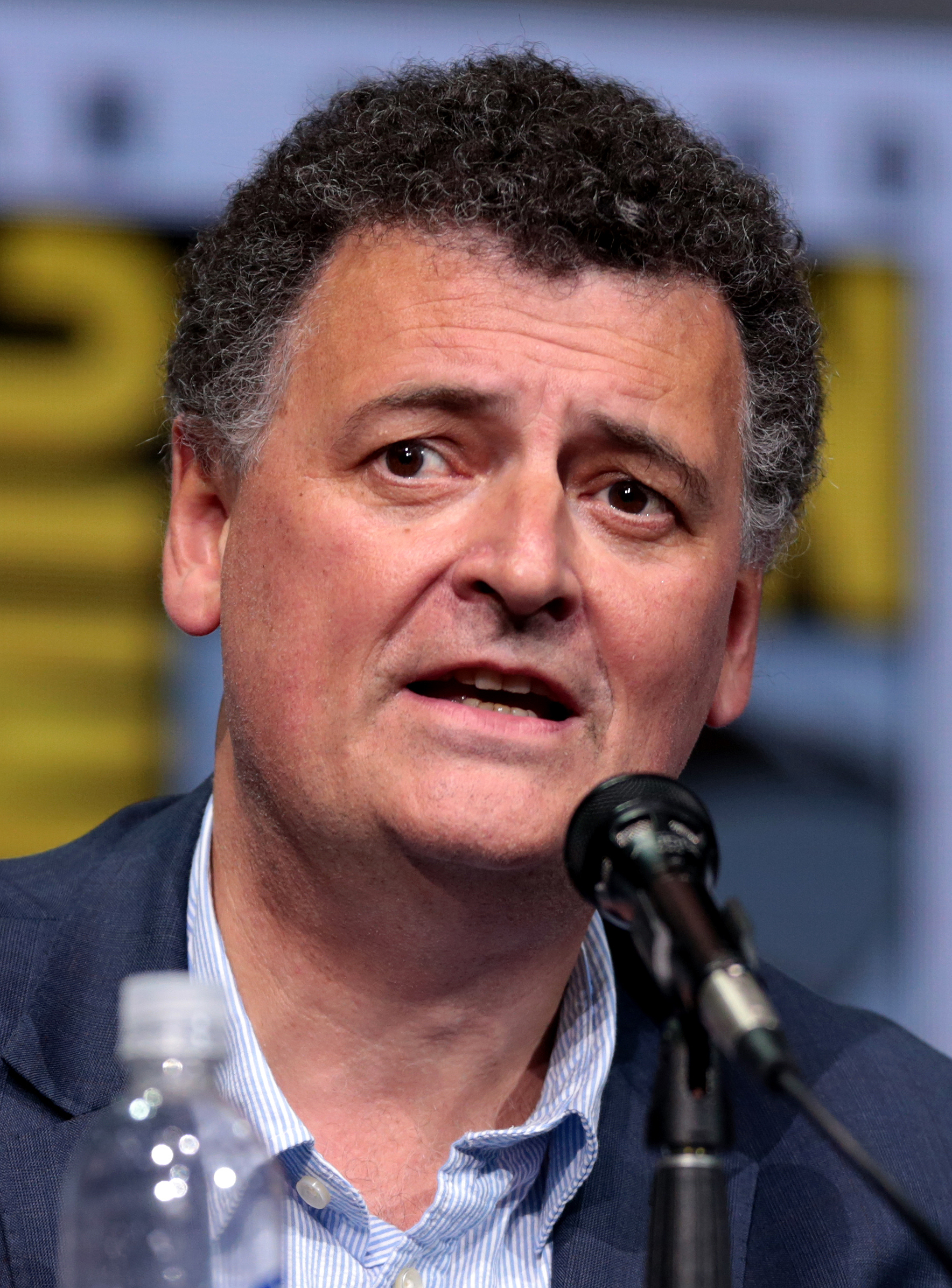
Writer Steven Moffat created the Weeping Angels, being inspired from several sources.

The Weeping Angels were created by writer Steven Moffat and first appeared in the 2007 episode "Blink". Moffat gained the inspiration for the Angels while on a holiday in Dorset. While exploring, he entered a graveyard marked as being unsafe and found a statue of an angel weeping. He returned years later with his son, but could not find the angel, nor any evidence that it had been there before. Though Moffat attempted further research into the statue in the years after the Weeping Angels appeared on-screen, their popularity made this much more difficult. Moffat was inspired by other sources, such as Heisenberg's Uncertainty Principle, which states that observation can affect the results of an experiment, as well as the concept of children covering their eyes when seeing something scary. Moffat first pitched the idea for the Angels in the series in 2006, proposing them with the idea that they were "statues that come to life when, but only when, they're unobserved." Stage directions in the original script for "Blink" emphasized that the Angels were not to be seen moving, with only the result of their movement being shown.

The Weeping Angels were announced to be returning in Moffat's first interview as showrunner in 2009. Moffat brought the Angels back in 2010 for the two-part episode "The Time of Angels" and "Flesh and Stone". The Angels' popularity had spiked, and Moffat knew the risks of bringing back a popular antagonist for another appearance. He based his approach for their comeback on Aliens, which multiplied the threat, and additionally aimed to evolve the Angels' role from that of scavengers to an organized force. For the Angels' subsequent appearance in 2012's "The Angels Take Manhattan", Moffat wanted to bring in an element that would justify the departure of Amy and Rory from the series while also reminding the Doctor of his past mistakes. Moffat settled on the Angels, having unused ideas he wished to incorporate with them. He also believed they would work within the story's New York setting, since the city had a large number of statues, including the Statue of Liberty. Moffat originally planned to have a Weeping Angel act as the main antagonist of the 2015 episode "Heaven Sent", but this was scrapped in development.

The Weeping Angels are portrayed by actresses. Due to the Angels' upright posture and angelic demeanor, dancers were hired to portray them. The costume for the Angels is complex and takes a long time to both put on and take off, with the actresses being on their feet for roughly fifteen hours a day during filming. The Angel costume consisted of a polyfoam skirt, polystyrene wings, vest, and head, and a foam latex face that had removable pieces for the eyes in their initial debut episode. Makeup work was done for other aspects of the actor, such as the arms. For their re-appearance in the two-parter, the makeup extended to the actresses' chest and back as well. The wings of the Angel were clipped into a corset the actresses wore. The studio Millenium FX helped with the Angels' prosthetics. In the two-parter, the various forms of Angels had different costumes, with decaying Angels using a full-body costume and the "semi-Angels" using cracked moulds glued to the skin and patterned tights on the legs. Freeze frames are used to make the Angels entirely still. The Angels have been portrayed by various actresses since their inception.

The Angels make a brief reappearance in the finale of the spin-off series Class, where they are revealed to be manipulating events behind the scenes. Patrick Ness, the series's creator, planned for the second series of Class to focus more on the Angels prior to the series's cancellation. This would have included a visit to their home world and a depiction of a civil war. Most of this would have been a mystery to the audience. Another Angel-related episode concept was dubbed "Time Capsule", which would have depicted an Angel sending the main cast back in time, with a time capsule being used to help them return to the present.

The Angels returned in Doctor Who series 13, also titled Flux. Moffat confirmed their return prior to the series's airing, and prior to their planned official announcement. Moffat later posted a humorous apology video, which ended with a Weeping Angel, implied to be sent by then-showrunner Chris Chibnall, sending Moffat back in time. Chibnall had wanted to have the Angels face off against the Thirteenth Doctor, and had been planning their return for some time. The cast was excited to film with the Angels, but experienced difficulty not blinking when shooting in cold weather.

== Reception and analysis ==
=== Reception ===
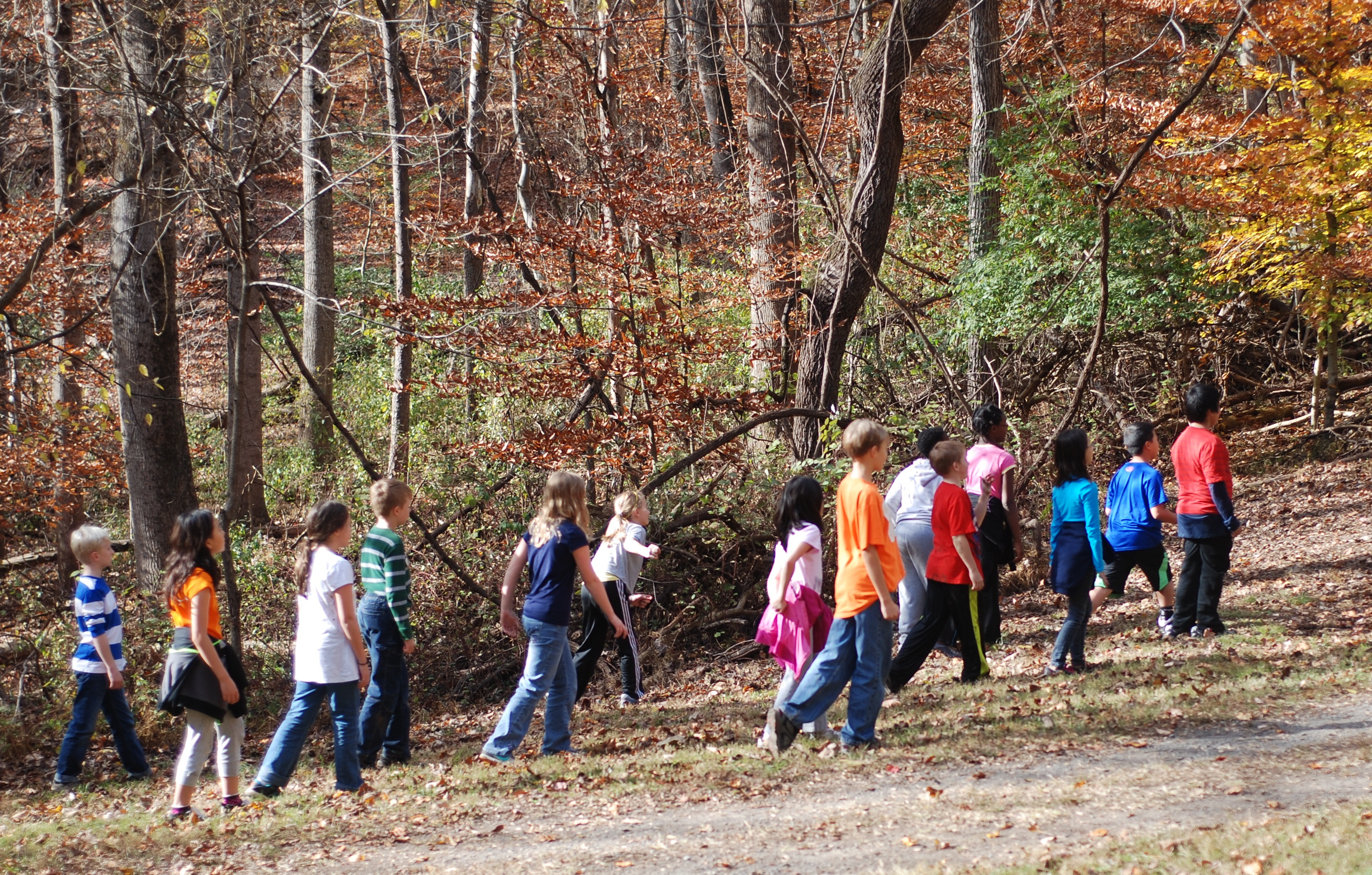
Steven Moffat attributed the appeal of the Weeping Angels to games like Grandmother's Footsteps.

The Weeping Angels have been consistently popular antagonists, with various reviews and polls ranking them as being among the most terrifying monsters in the series's history. Huw Fullerton, writing for the Radio Times, stated that the Angels are "genuinely disturbing", highlighting their specific style of movement in aiding in this. In Envisioning Legality, Penny Crofts stated that the Angels acted as terrifying antagonists due to them turning a victim's own bodily functions and flaws, such as blinking, against them. Noel McDermott, a psychotherapist, stated that the Weeping Angels invoked fear in viewers due to how the mind handled threat assessment, with the Weeping Angels constantly being in peripheral vision in episodes of the series enhancing that feeling. Creator Steven Moffat attributed their appeal to childhood games such as Grandmother's Footsteps and the notion that any stone statue might secretly be a disguised Weeping Angel.

Josephine Watson, writing for TechRadar, highlighted the Angels' role in "Blink", believing their role to be fundamentally unique. She highlighted the directorial choices made to emphasize the Angels in the episode, such as the use of actresses over computer generated effects, as well as the use of camera angles, to make the Angels a terrifying enemy. In Gender and Contemporary Horror in Television, Khara Lukancic emphasizes this aspect, stating that the episode's musical cues, sound cues, and use of camera angles allows audiences to immediately understand that the Angels are enemies to be feared. James Whitbrook, writing for Gizmodo, criticized the Angels' role in "Village of the Angels". He stated that while their horror element was effectively utilized during the early acts of the episode, he felt that the episode robbed the Angels of their mysterious nature by giving them concrete motivations and many new powers and abilities that Whitbrook felt made the Angels weaker threats as a whole. Adi Tantimedh, writing for Bleeding Cool, praised various additions made to the Angels since their debut for helping to make the Angels scary, but believed that the Angels' overexposure made them less imposing antagonists overall.

=== Analysis ===
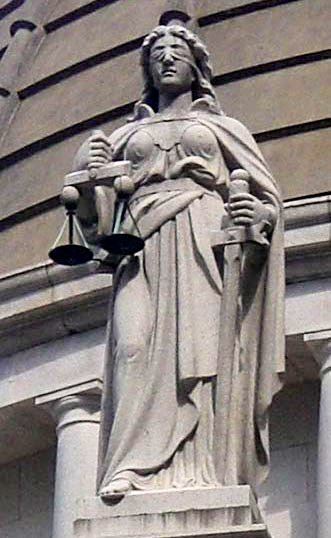
Lady Justice was compared to the Weeping Angels by Penny Crofts, who used their various similarities to compare the Angels to the concept of justice.

In the book Doctor Who and Philosophy: Bigger on the Inside, Michelle Saint and Peter A. French analyzed the role of the Weeping Angels in the show. The book stated that unlike other popular antagonists in the series, like the Daleks and the Cybermen, the Angels gave off an air of serenity, with the Weeping Angels' inherent beauty also making viewers have a more visceral reaction to their actions. They stated what made the Weeping Angels terrifying was for their ability to upend people's lives, which induces a fear of powerlessness in viewers as a result of how difficult it is to combat the Angels individually, and that doing an action as minor as blinking can result in a person having their life ripped away from them. This elicits a strong, more personal threat in viewers that robs their victims of their sense of who they are. Crofts stated similarly, believing the use of the fear of the unknown and the fact that the Angels' transportation through time removed characters of their identity gave the Angels an "inexplicable type of violence". She stated that it highlighted how greatly people are affected by their place and time, and how it deeply affects people to be removed from it.

Lukancic analyzed the Angels' more feminine appearance, stating that the Angels acted as a combination of various antagonistic feminine archetypes, such as witches and old crones; their more feminine appearance contrasts them with the Daleks and Cybermen, who the book depicts as representing a form of toxic masculinity. The book notes that whenever the Angels kill, or break their normal routines, they tend to take on a more masculine, monstrous depiction; the book states that as a result of this depiction, the show equates more masculine antagonists with greater brutality and villainy. The book The Doctor's Monsters: Meanings of the Monstrous in Doctor Who stated that the Weeping Angels' unique abilities present in their debut episode symbolized how monsters in the show rarely could change and adapt despite their abilities, as the Angels had a single-function ability that could only be applied to so many potential stories. The book further stated that their defeat at the hands of Sally Sparrow, a regular person who overcame and adapted to the Angels, emphasized the show's core themes of using science and logic to defeat its antagonists. Crofts analyzed the Angels' role in terms of their similarities, both in physical appearance and demeanor, with the iconography of Lady Justice, stating that highlighted the undercut connection between the Angels and justice. She stated that the Angels represent the corruption that lies within justice as a result of the connection, highlighted with the Angels' horror lying in their ability to inflict harm without reason or motivation. The mental damage caused by the Angels' time travel on their victims was compared to prisoners being imprisoned, as both are mentally shattered as a result of the sudden changes brought onto their lives by a corrupt form of justice.

Weeping Angel, named after the aliens, is the name of a hacking tool revealed in Vault 7, co-developed in 2014 by the CIA and MI5, used to exploit smart TVs for the purpose of covert intelligence gathering. Once installed in a suitable TV, the tool enables the television to record its surroundings while appearing to be turned off.
