= Rochenda Sandall =

English actress (born 1988)

- Born: 1988 (age 37–38); Grimsby, Lincolnshire, England
- Education: Royal Academy of Dramatic Art
- Occupation: Actress

Rochenda Sandall (born 1988) is a British actress who played Lisa McQueen in the television series Line of Duty (2019), and has featured in other productions including Small Axe (2020), Doctor Who (2021), and Amandaland (2025–present).

== Biography ==
Rochenda Sandall was born in 1988 in Grimsby, and grew up in Goxhill. Her grandfather was Jamaican. Aged 17, she moved to London and attended the East 15 Acting School. She graduated from the Royal Academy of Dramatic Art in 2012, later making her stage debut in Scenes from an Execution at the Royal National Theatre. For the next few years, she worked mainly in theatrical productions, including in Coriolanus alongside Tom Hiddleston. Meanwhile, she had roles as police officers in the television series Doctors and Coronation Street. Her monologue performance in Alan Bennett's The Outside Dog was selected by The Guardian as the best theatre show of 2020.

Sandall was a series regular in Criminal: UK, as Detective Constable Vanessa Warren. Sandall starred with Letitia Wright and John Boyega in Small Axe (2020), and also had roles in Black Mirror: Bandersnatch and in Star Wars: The Rise of Skywalker. She appeared as a high-ranking member of a criminal gang in Line of Duty, and played Azure in the 13th series of Doctor Who. In 2023, Sandall had a supporting role starring in a cast that included Idris Elba and Archie Panjabi in the Apple TV+ series Hijack. In 2025, Sandall appeared in BBC Comedy Amandaland.

In 2020, Sandall was reported to be in a long-term relationship with fellow actor Mark Stanley, who acted with her in Criminal: UK.

== Filmography ==
Key
†	Denotes projects that have not yet been released

=== Film ===
Year	Title	Role	Notes	Ref.
2016	The Cocktail Waitress	Rachel	Short film	
2017	Instant Fix	A432	Short film	
2018	Care	Amanda	Television film	
2018	Black Mirror: Bandersnatch	Pippa		
2019	Star Wars: The Rise of Skywalker	Sith Fleet Officer		
2019	Promenade	Grace	Short film	
2021	Bufflehead	Patient	Short film	
2025	Dragonfly	Michelle		
2025	The Pigs Underneath	Anita	Short film	
2025	Finding Father Christmas	Georgina	Television film	

=== Television ===
Year	Title	Role	Notes	Ref.
2013	Doctors	PC Jenny Briggs	Episode: "Release"	
2015–2016	Coronation Street	Police officer	Recurring role; 3 episodes	
2017	Broken	Jean Reid	Recurring role; 4 episodes	
2017	Love, Lies and Records	Anna Dickenson	Series regular; 6 episodes	
2018	Girlfriends	DS Anne Thurston	Recurring role; 2 episodes	
2018	Into the Badlands	Nadia	Recurring role; 2 episodes	
2019	Silent Witness	Liz Lee	Episode: "Two Spirits, Part 2"	
2019	Moving On	Carol	Episode: "A Walk in My Shoes"	
2019	Line of Duty	Lisa McQueen	Recurring role; 6 episodes	
2019	Hatton Garden	Officer Roberts	Miniseries; 1 episode	
2019	Zomboat!	GrizzlyKaren	Episode: "Episode 2"	
2019–2020	Criminal: UK	Vanessa Warren	Series regular; 7 episodes	
2020	Unprecedented	Rebecca	Episode: "Everybody's Talkin'"	
2020	Talking Heads	Marjory	Episode: "The Outside Dog"	
2020	Small Axe	Barbara Beese	Episode: "Mangrove"	
2021	Deceit	Lucy	Miniseries; 4 episodes	
2021	Doctor Who	Azure	Recurring role; 6 episodes	
2023	Great Expectations	Bryana	Episode: "Episode 4"	
2023	Hijack	Kate Miller	Recurring role; 7 episodes	
2023–2025	The Rig	Cat Braithwaite	Series regular; 12 episodes	
2025–	Amandaland	Fi	Series regular; 6 episodes	
2026	The Teacher	Tessa Gibson	Miniseries; 4 episodes	
2026	Secret Service	Melissa Morris	Completed	

== Theatre credits ==
Year	Title	Role	Venue	Notes	Ref.
2012	Scenes from an Execution	Dementia	Lyttelton Theatre, London		
2013	Coriolanus	Ensemble	Donmar Warehouse, London		
2015	Little Malcolm and His Struggle Against the Eunuchs	Ann George	Southwark Playhouse, London		
2015	Pomona	Gale	Temporary Theatre, London & Royal Exchange, Manchester		
2016	The Nap	Eleanor Sergant	Crucible Theatre, Sheffield		
2018	Gundog	Anna	Royal Court Theatre, London		
2023	Black Superhero	Syd	Royal Court Theatre, London		
