= Lucky Day (Doctor Who) =

316 – "Lucky Day"
- Doctor Who episode
- Promotional title-card

Cast
- Doctor: Ncuti Gatwa – Fifteenth Doctor
- Companions: Varada Sethu – Belinda Chandra; Millie Gibson – Ruby Sunday
- Others: Benjamin Chivers – Young Conrad; Kirsty Hoiles – Moira Clark; Jonah Hauer-King – Conrad Clark; Gethin Alderman – The Shreek; Kareem Alexander – Jordan Lang; Michelle Greenidge – Carla Sunday; Angela Wynter – Cherry Sunday; Faye McKeever – Louise Miller; Madison Stock – Elsa; Paddy Stafford – Sparky; Blake Anderson – Jack; Aoife Gaston – Michelle; Paul Jerricho – Alfie; Michael Woodford – Derek; Jemma Redgrave – Kate Lethbridge-Stewart; Alexander Devrient – Colonel Christofer Ibrahim; Tina Gray – Audrey; Ruth Madeley – Shirley Bingham; Lachele Carl – Trinity Wells; Reeta Chakrabarti – Herself; Joel Dommett – Himself; Alex Jones – Herself; Calypso Cragg – Influencer 2; James Craven – Influencer 3; Selorm Adonu – Influencer 1; Aidan Cook – The Vlinx; Nicholas Briggs – Voice of the Vlinx; Anita Dobson – Mrs Flood

Production
- Directed by: Peter Hoar
- Written by: Pete McTighe
- Produced by: Vicki Delow
- Executive producers: Russell T Davies; Julie Gardner; Jane Tranter; Joel Collins; Phil Collinson
- Music by: Murray Gold
- Series: Series 15
- Running time: 46 minutes
- First broadcast: 3 May 2025

Chronology
← Preceded by "The Well"	Followed by → "The Story & the Engine"

"Lucky Day" is the fourth episode of the fifteenth series of the British science-fiction television series Doctor Who. It was written by Pete McTighe, and was directed by Peter Hoar. The episode was released on BBC iPlayer, BBC One and Disney+ on 3 May 2025. It features the return of companion Ruby Sunday (Millie Gibson), who plays a leading role in the episode opposite Conrad Clark (Jonah Hauer-King), with both the Fifteenth Doctor (Ncuti Gatwa) and Belinda Chandra (Varada Sethu), the series' main leads, only appearing briefly. The episode focuses on Ruby, who begins a relationship with podcaster Conrad Clark as she attempts to find her place in the world after leaving the Doctor. When Conrad's true aim to turn the public against military organisation UNIT is revealed, Ruby and Kate Lethbridge-Stewart have to deal with the repercussions of Conrad's actions.

"Lucky Day" was devised by showrunner Russell T Davies, and Davies enlisted McTighe to write it. McTighe used the episode to develop Ruby and Kate's characters while also exploring the spread and effects of online hatred. The episode's monster, the Shreek, was based on McTighe's childhood fears of dog-like creatures in the dark, with the Shreek being portrayed via costume and an animatronic head. Filming took place in November 2023 in Newton, Porthcawl and at Wolf Studios Wales; it was filmed back-to-back with the series premiere. "Lucky Day" received positive reviews from critics, who highlighted Gibson's performance, the twist regarding Conrad's true motives and the episode's social commentary, but were more critical of underdeveloped plotlines and the execution of Conrad as an antagonist. And was watched by 2.83 million viewers, the lowest total viewership in the series' 62 year history at time of broadcast.

== Plot ==
The Doctor and his companion Belinda Chandra arrive on New Year's Day 2007 and meet 8-year-old Conrad Clark. Over the next several years, Conrad investigates sightings of the Doctor and his ship the TARDIS. An adult Conrad eventually sees the Doctor with his then-companion Ruby Sunday in 2024, where Conrad is marked as prey by a creature called the Shreek. In 2025, after Ruby stopped travelling with the Doctor, Ruby gives Conrad an interview on his podcast about her encounters with extraterrestrial life. They start dating, and she gives him an antidote to prevent him from being hunted by the Shreek, which has recently been captured by military organisation UNIT.

During a weekend at Conrad's home village, Ruby tells Conrad she is suffering from post-traumatic stress disorder following her experiences with the Doctor. Two Shreek appear in pursuit of Conrad, who admits he did not take the antidote. Ruby calls UNIT and their leader Kate Lethbridge-Stewart to the village. The Shreek are revealed to be actors in costumes, and are part of a group led by Conrad that seeks to discredit UNIT, with Conrad's relationship with Ruby a ploy to further his plans. Conrad and his team frame the scene negatively towards UNIT, and media and social media coverage turn against UNIT. Conrad and his followers continue to perpetuate disinformation claiming that UNIT is committing fraud and that aliens do not exist.

Kate realises Conrad has an insider in UNIT and the insider sneaks Conrad into the UNIT headquarters. Kate allows Conrad to reach the command floor, where he livestreams his intrusion. In order to expose Conrad's lies, Kate releases the Shreek, which hunts him. With the Shreek attacking him, Conrad admits on his livestream he has been lying about UNIT. Ruby stuns the Shreek, but when Conrad backtracks on that admission, the Shreek bites his arm. Public sentiment turns in UNIT's favour, although Kate's superiors believe she went too far in releasing the Shreek. Ruby decides to get away from UNIT to overcome her trauma and Kate offers her support. Conrad is imprisoned and visited by the Doctor, who hails from a point in time before he met Belinda. The Doctor berates Conrad for spreading lies and harming Ruby and his friends, and tells him that he will die in prison and be forgotten by history. After the Doctor leaves, a woman named Mrs Flood releases Conrad from jail.

== Production ==
=== Development ===
Doctor Who showrunner Russell T Davies wished to include an episode discussing the spread of toxicity and hatred on the internet, and contacted writer Pete McTighe to write the script. The two first talked over FaceTime and later on Zoom as McTighe was abroad in Australia. Davies also sent McTighe viewing copies of the three 60th anniversary specials, the 2023 Christmas special, and the entirety of the fourteenth series, before any of those episodes had been publicly released, so that he could better understand Ruby's character development. Prior to penning "Lucky Day", McTighe had written the eleventh and twelfth series episodes "Kerblam!" and "Praxeus" under previous Doctor Who showrunner Chris Chibnall. He and fellow fifteenth series writer Inua Ellams were additionally involved in earlier development of the thirteenth run of episodes with Chibnall, prior to it being forcibly shortened by the COVID-19 pandemic to become the six-part Flux serial.

When writing the episode, McTighe said that he wanted to take the opportunity to explore what happens to a companion after they leave the Doctor, feeling that it had infrequently been done in the show's past. McTighe described it as a mix between action, romantic comedy, and gothic horror. He also compared one of the main settings to the village Devil's End from the 1971 Third Doctor serial, The Dæmons, and believed that, with the story being Ruby-centric, made it similar to the 2024 episode "73 Yards". Conrad and his followers refer to themselves as "Think Tank"; McTighe revealed this to be a reference to a group with the same name in the 1974–1975 Fourth Doctor serial, Robot. Ruby was referred to as having post-traumatic stress disorder following her time with the Doctor, which Davies wanted to portray in the episode. "Lucky Day" allowed McTighe to explore Kate's character further, with her willingness to go too far being something that McTighe stated would have further repercussions "beyond this episode, beyond this season, even beyond this show."

McTighe developed the Shreek from his childhood fears of dog-like creatures in darkness. The conceptual idea was based on a terrifying "four-legged, creeping animal" that had a desire to hunt and could not be reasoned with. Prior to that, the Shreek were first mentioned in Caged, a 2024 Doctor Who novel by Una McCormack. A number of Easter egg references to past episodes and popular culture were included in Lucky Day as well. The episode is a "Doctor-light", a term used to describe instalments of the programme which feature the Doctor minimally. Davies stated this required them to find "inventive ways" to include the Doctor, one of which is a flashback to an unseen story set during the previous series. The Doctor's scene with Conrad at the end of the episode takes place before the Doctor meets Belinda Chandra, revealing how the Doctor had prior knowledge of her in "The Robot Revolution". The read-through for "Lucky Day" took place at Wolf Studios Wales on 7 November 2023, with attendees noting a unique atmosphere due to unaware cast members' response to Conrad's reveal as a villain.

=== Casting ===
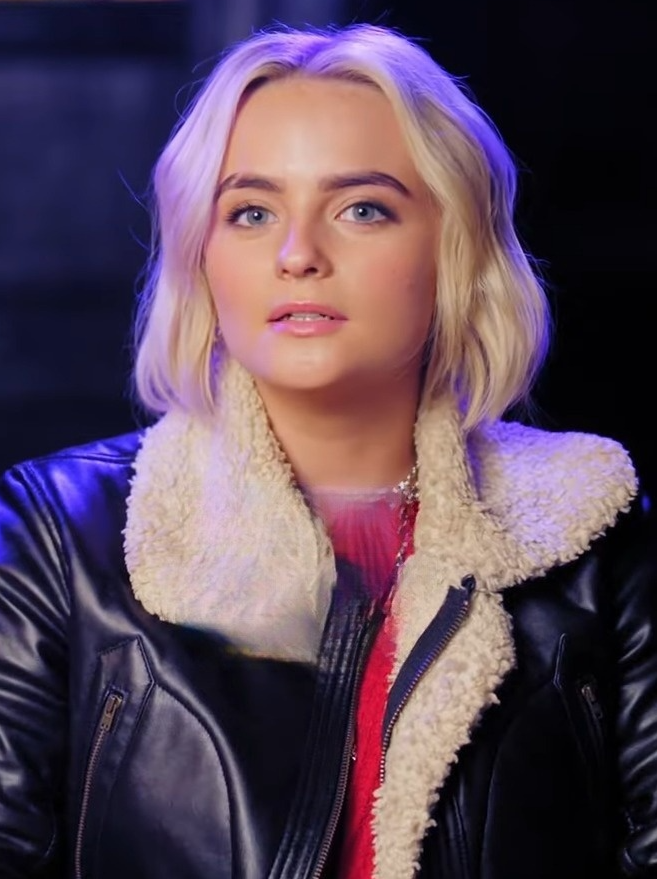
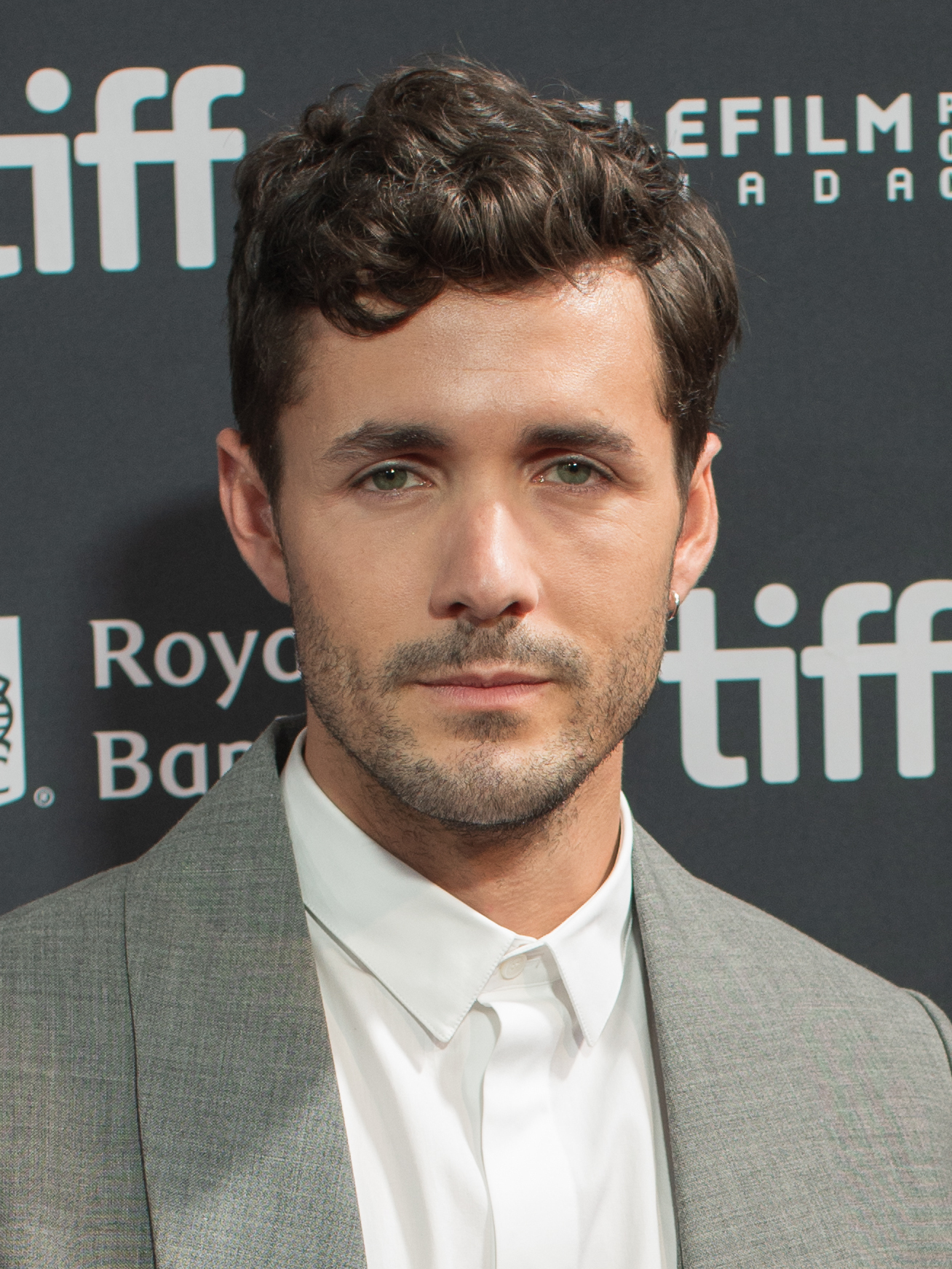
The episode starred Millie Gibson (left) and Jonah Hauer-King (right; both pictured in 2024) as Ruby Sunday and Conrad Clark.

Millie Gibson returns as former companion Ruby Sunday. It was the first of three appearances that Gibson makes during the fifteenth series, as well as her first appearance since the 2024 Christmas special, "Joy to the World". In July 2024, at the Doctor Who San Diego Comic-Con panel, it was officially announced that Jonah Hauer-King had been cast in a role that would be involved in Ruby's character arc. Further details later revealed that Hauer-King would portray Conrad, a podcaster and Ruby's boyfriend. Following the episode's broadcast, Gibson revealed in an interview that Hauer-King's character would also appear later on in the series.

Ncuti Gatwa and Varada Sethu also make brief appearances as the fifteenth incarnation of the Doctor and his companion, Belinda Chandra, respectively. Paul Jerricho, who plays Alfie in the story, previously held the role of the Castellan in "The Five Doctors" (1983). Lachele Carl reprised her role as newsreader Trinity Wells. Alex Jones appears as herself, a Welsh presenter on The One Show interviewing Conrad. The remainder of the guest cast includes Jemma Redgrave, Ruth Madeley, Michelle Greenidge, Angela Wynter, Alexander Devrient, and Anita Dobson as Kate Lethbridge-Stewart, Shirley Bingham, Carla and Cherry Sunday, Colonel Christofer Ibrahim, and Mrs Flood respectively. Nicholas Briggs is also featured in a voice role as the Vlinx.

=== Production design ===
The primary Shreek costume was constructed using fibreglass molds and clay, with the final molds eventually being injected with silicon and painted. The Shreek uses an animatronic head. The Shreek costumes used by Conrad's friends were designed as imitative versions of the original, by looking similar to an extent, but intentionally fake. The design team at Millennium FX had a designer look at the primary Shreek costume once and then construct this derivative version from memory to reflect the costumes' in-universe construction. The team had to make the costumes look convincing while also looking like "rubber costumes", which proved a challenge. The Shreek performers were unable to see inside the mask of the Shreek costume, requiring outside direction for the actors to know where they needed to go.

The inclusion of mannequins in the scene where Conrad explores the abandoned department store featuring the Shreek was a result of McTighe wanting to include a callback to the first episode of Doctor Who's revival, "Rose" (2005), which featured living mannequins called Autons. Costume designer Pam Downe designed Ruby's outfits with dark blue and green colours, which Gibson felt were "more mature colours"; one of her outfits included a pinstripe suit and pants that Gibson said was reminiscent of one of David Tennant's previous outfits in the series.

=== Filming ===
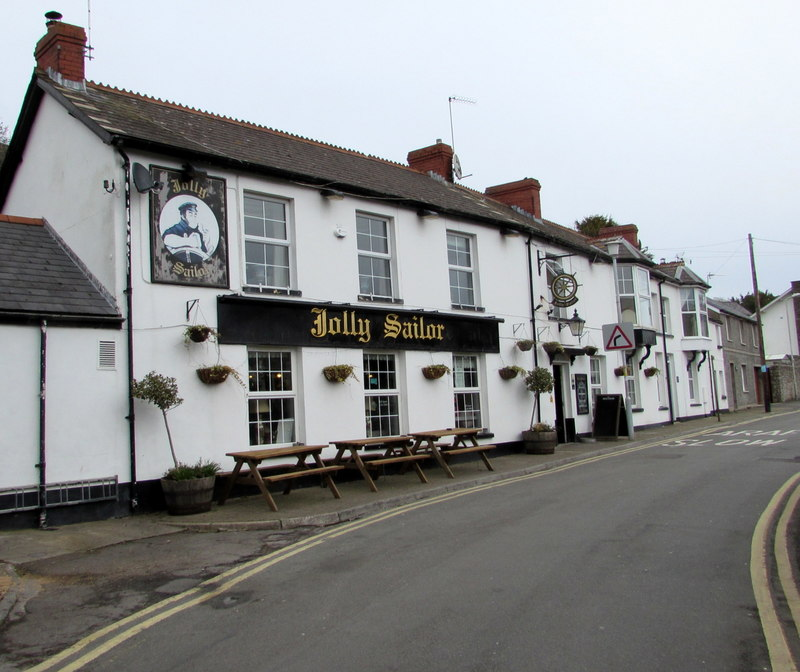
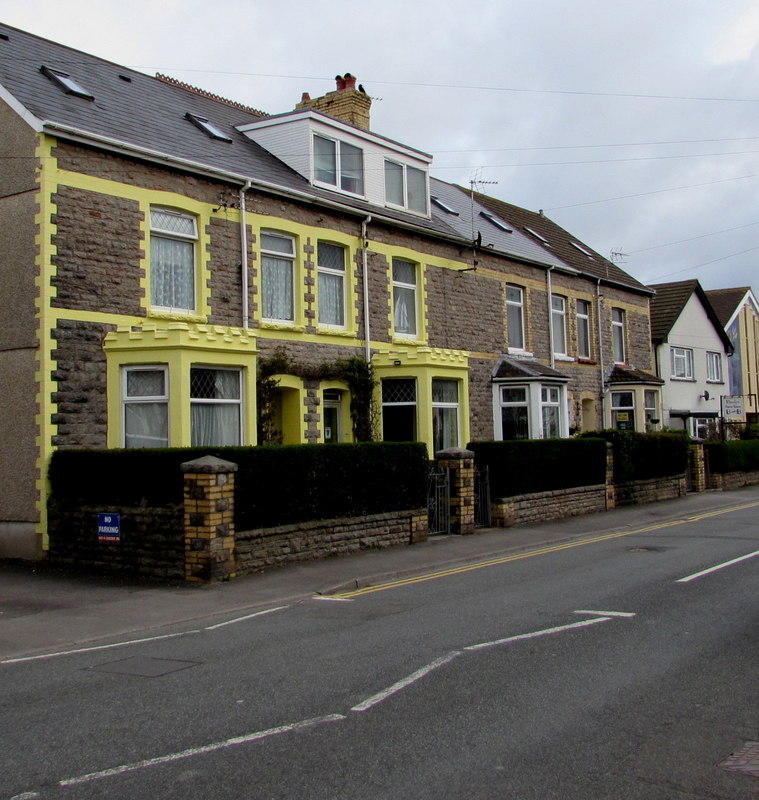
Filming occurred in the Welsh village of Newton, Porthcawl (pictured in 2016).

"Lucky Day" was directed by Peter Hoar, marking his second directorial work for Doctor Who over a decade after his first, "A Good Man Goes to War". The episode was placed in the second production block of the fifteenth series with the first episode, "The Robot Revolution", and followed recording of "Joy to the World" in the block immediately preceding. The two episodes in this block were filmed concurrently by utilising a back-to-back filming technique. Principal photography for the episode began on 14 November 2023. Gibson and Hauer-King were spotted filming scenes together a day later.

Location filming was done in Cardiff City Centre on 24 November. The production team made use of Howells department store for the aforementioned abandoned department store scene, which was similarly used as a filming location in "Rose". For the scenes set in the village, the town of Newton, Porthcawl, was used, with recording taking place from 27–29 November. Two-thirds of the budget allocated to the six-week filming block was used during those three days, three hours of which were spent shooting three takes with a helicopter.

Soundstage recording was done at Wolf Studios Wales. A former authorised firearms officer was present on set as a weapons master because real firearms with blank cartridges were utilised during filming. Hoar originally hoped to re-use the helipad set that was constructed for "The Giggle" (2023) for the scene where Conrad breaks into the UNIT Tower, but it had been torn down after production concluded on that episode and there were not enough funds to rebuild it. A Steadicam was ultimately used to film to make following Conrad easier. McTighe's initial script included extras of Conrad's followers entering the tower with him, however, the number of people for the scene had to be reduced for feasibility. Two Shreek performers were kept on set, one specializing in movement and the other in action. The crew struggled with getting the Shreek's mouth to open wide enough to bite Conrad. A pre-broken window also had to be fabricated because stunt glass is not fabricated in sizes large enough for the window frame.

== Broadcast and reception ==
Professional ratings
Aggregate scores
Source	Rating
Rotten Tomatoes (Tomatometer)	75%
Review scores
Source	Rating
The A.V. Club	B−
Bleeding Cool	10/10
Evening Standard	4/5 stars
GamesRadar+	3.5/5 stars
IGN	7/10
Radio Times	3/5 stars
Vulture	4/5 stars

=== Broadcast ===
"Lucky Day" was simultaneously released on BBC iPlayer at 8 a.m. British Summer Time (BST) in the United Kingdom and on Disney+ in the United States at 12 a.m. Pacific Daylight Time on 3 May 2025. A BBC One broadcast of the episode followed at 7:10 p.m. BST. Disney also handled international distribution of the episode.

=== Ratings ===
In the United Kingdom, the episode recorded overnight broadcast ratings of 1.5 million, a decline on the previous episodes and setting a new record low after "Lux"'s 1.58 million. The episode received a total of 2.83 million consolidated viewers across 7 days, and a total of 3.29 million consolidated viewers across 28 days.

=== Critical reception ===
On the review aggregator website Rotten Tomatoes, 70% of 10 critics' reviews are positive. Robert Anderson, writing for IGN, praised the episode's writing, the performance of Gibson and the usage of Conrad as an antagonist, though stated that the episode at times could feel "hollow" and that Ruby's character arc was not as well executed as it could have been. Daniel Cooper, writing for Engadget, similarly highlighted the twist about Conrad's identity, McTighe's writing and the episode's social commentary, but felt Conrad's backstory utilising "the trope that survivors of abuse perpetuate that cycle of abuse" was overused. Adi Tantimedh, writing for Bleeding Cool, praised the episode, highlighting the twist involving Conrad and the episode's social commentary.

Stefan Mohammed, writing for Den of Geek, found several of the episode's plot points underdeveloped, believing that Ruby's decision to leave UNIT was not justified by her relationship with family and Kate, and that Conrad embodying all aspects of the social issues being discussed made him feel overcomplicated with unclear motivations. Despite this, he found Gibson's performance compelling and highlighted the episode's usage of Kate. Vicky Jessop, writing for the London Standard, penned a positive review for the episode but felt Conrad's execution as an antagonist was weak and that the consequences of his actions were not explored well enough. Isobel Lewis from The A.V. Club opined that the episode had consistency issues not present in the rest of the series; she also found the plot as being too similar to "73 Yards", to which she negatively compared "Lucky Day".
