= Peter Hoar =

British television director (born 1969)

- Born: Peter James Hoar; November 1969 (age 56); United Kingdom
- Occupations: Film and television director
- Known for: Doctor Who; The Last of Us

Peter James Hoar (born November 1969) is a British film and television director. He has two BAFTA wins, and Emmy nominations. His work includes Daredevil, Doctor Who, It's a Sin and The Last of Us.

== Career ==
Hoar studied Media Production at Bournemouth University in 1989, graduating in 1992.

Hoar started out as a runner on Peak Practice, where he worked up to six years, working his way up the ladder to location manager and trainee director. He went on to direct on Channel 4 soap opera Hollyoaks, before moving into series dramas such as Wire in the Blood, The Innocence Project and Spooks.

=== As director ===
Hoar directed nine episodes of Da Vinci's Demons, created by The Dark Knight story writer David S. Goyer.

In 2016, Hoar made his Marvel debut directing three episodes of Daredevil for Netflix, with Charlie Cox in the leading role. The show marked Peter's first formal American TV credit, and the beginning of a relationship with Marvel's television division. He went on to direct an episode of Iron Fist, Runaways, Cloak & Dagger, and The Defenders.

He continued working with Netflix, bringing two episodes of Altered Carbon to the screen. He later directed the first episode and finale of The Umbrella Academy season 1, based on the Dark Horse comic; marking his sixth comic book property adaptation for television.

=== Doctor Who ===
Hoar directed the 2011 mid-series finale of Series 6 of Doctor Who, titled "A Good Man Goes to War". Directing Doctor Who marked a life-long ambition for Hoar, who was inspired by the show as a ten-year-old realising "it was somebody's job to make that show." Following the announcement of Russell T Davies returning to Doctor Who, Hoar said he would "love to do another Doctor Who but it's not on the cards right now". He said Doctor Who played a pivotal role in his life, "I grew up with that show, and I'm here because of that show. And from that, I just span out into all kinds of science fiction".

In October 2023, it was confirmed that Hoar would return to direct for Series 15. Hoar's return saw him direct 2 episodes with Ncuti Gatwa's Fifteenth Doctor, "The Robot Revolution", written by Russell T Davies, and "Lucky Day", by Pete McTighe.

=== It's a Sin ===
2021 saw the debut of Channel 4's drama It's a Sin, directed by Hoar and written by Russell T Davies. The importance of authentic casting and crewing of gay and queer actors and creatives became a pivotal talking point in the success of the series, with Peter and Russell often discussing this as an asset for the show.

In March 2022, It's a Sin received 11 nominations for the BAFTA Television Awards, with Hoar being nominated for Best Director: Fiction. He won the award at the BAFTA TV Craft Awards ceremony on 24 April 2022.

In late 2021 it was announced that Hoar would be re-teaming with Davies to direct a new 3-part series Nolly starring Helena Bonham Carter.

=== The Last of Us ===
Hoar was confirmed to be directing an episode of the live-action adaptation series in a filing by the Directors Guild of Canada in July 2021. That episode, titled "Long, Long Time", featured a love story between two middle-aged gay men surviving for years after a zombie apocalypse. Hoar felt a personal connection to the story, as a gay man himself.

In July 2023, Hoar was announced as a nominee in the Outstanding Directing for a Drama Series category at the 2023 Primetime Emmy Awards, part of 24 nominations for The Last of Us.

In January 2024, it was announced that Hoar would return as a director for the second season of the show, making Hoar the only guest director to return to the show. Hoar directed episode 3 of season 2, titled "The Path", which depicts the character Ellie mourning the loss of Joel.

Peter won his second BAFTA award for Best Director: Fiction in April 2024, at the BAFTA TV Craft Awards, for the Long, Long Time episode.

=== Boots ===
In May 2023, it was announced that Hoar would direct and executive produce the first episode of The Corps for Netflix, inspired by Greg Cope White's memoir The Pink Marine. Filming of the series was extensively delayed in 2023 due to the 2023 SAG-AFTRA strike, with filming finally resuming in March 2024 and reportedly wrapping in August. In August 2025, the series was retitled as Boots and premiered on October 9, 2025.
