= The Robot Revolution =

313 – "The Robot Revolution"
- Doctor Who episode
- Promotional title-card

Cast
- Doctor: Ncuti Gatwa – Fifteenth Doctor
- Companion: Varada Sethu – Belinda Chandra
- Others: Jonny Green – Alan Budd; Thalia Dudek – Kirby Blake; Jeffin Kunjumon – Stefan Haines; Belinda Owusu – Receptionist; Tom Storey – Tombo; Stephen Love – Robot 1; Robert Strange – Robot 2; Nicholas Briggs – Voice of the Robots; Anita Dobson – Mrs Flood; Evelyn Miller – Sasha 55; Charles Sandford – Robot 3; Lucas Edwards – Robot 4; Max Parker – Manny; Caleb Hughes – Scoley; Nadine Higgin – Shago; William Ellis – Prime Minister

Production
- Directed by: Peter Hoar
- Written by: Russell T Davies
- Produced by: Vicki Delow
- Executive producers: Russell T Davies; Julie Gardner; Jane Tranter; Joel Collins; Phil Collinson
- Music by: Murray Gold
- Series: Series 15
- Running time: 46 minutes
- First broadcast: 12 April 2025

Chronology
← Preceded by "Joy to the World"	Followed by → "Lux"

"The Robot Revolution" is the first episode of the fifteenth series of the British science fiction television series Doctor Who. The episode was written by Russell T Davies, the Doctor Who showrunner, and directed by Peter Hoar. In this episode, the Fifteenth Doctor (Ncuti Gatwa) fails to rescue Belinda Chandra (Varada Sethu) after she is kidnapped from Earth and inadvertently gets involved in a war on another planet.

Davies used the script to explore a larger narrative of what he viewed as real-world issues. Pre-production for the episode began in October 2023, with many design aspects based around retrofuturism. Filming then occurred in November and December at Wolf Studios Wales and in Roath, Cardiff. Post-production continued for some months later. It was released on BBC iPlayer, BBC One, and Disney+ on 12 April 2025.

"The Robot Revolution" was seen by 3.56 million viewers. Reception was mostly positive, with Belinda's characterisation particularly praised, though the episode's themes and use of the supporting cast was the subject of criticism. A novelisation written by Una McCormack was released on 10 July 2025.

== Plot ==
On 24 May 2025, Belinda Chandra is captured by robots and taken as their queen to "Missbelindachandra One", a planet orbiting the star "Miss Belinda Chandra", named as such by her ex-boyfriend Alan seventeen years earlier. Belinda verbally blames Alan for her kidnapping on the spaceship.

The "Missbelindachandrakind" are composed of humanoids and robots, who coexisted peacefully until the robots took control and some of the humans began to rebel. The robots are controlled by the Great AI Generator, who plans to merge with Belinda. The Doctor, who had been in pursuit of Belinda, arrived six months before her and has since become the planet's historian. Exploiting a fault that prevents the robots from hearing every ninth word, the Doctor and the rebels rescue Belinda, although several rebels, including their leader Sasha 55, are killed.

The Doctor realises that the robots also possess the same version of Belinda's star-naming certificate but that it is 5,000 years older. How the robots acquired the certificate is left unclear. Belinda allows herself to be captured, asking the robots to spare the rebels. Belinda and the Doctor are taken to the Great AI Generator—revealed to be not AI but rather Alan, who had been captured by the robots ten years earlier after Belinda cast blame on him. Viewing life on Missbelindachandra One as a game, Alan merged himself with the machines and started the war because—as it is revealed—Belinda had broken up with him due to his controlling behaviour.

Using every ninth word, Alan communicates to them that he is in pain. Belinda touches her version of the certificate to Alan's, which causes them to experience all of time simultaneously. The Doctor rescues Belinda while Alan reverts to a sperm and egg, which is cleaned up by a robot.

Now free, the humanoids and robots rebuild their society while the Doctor takes Belinda to his TARDIS to time-travel. He describes meeting her distant descendant Mundy Flynn. (Note: As depicted in the episode "Boom" (2024)) Belinda demands to be taken home. However, the TARDIS is unable to return to 24 May 2025, forcing Belinda to travel with the Doctor until she can return. As the TARDIS dematerialises, debris from several Earth landmarks and the certificate float in space, and a calendar turns to 24 May 2025.

== Production ==
=== Development ===
"The Robot Revolution" was written by Doctor Who showrunner Russell T Davies. He initially conceptualised the idea as a one-off story but later reworked it into a series premiere to serve as a companion introduction. Davies said that the episode was difficult to write because he struggled with turning a joke about naming a star after someone into a full script, and that he also viewed the episode as a wider narrative about the concerns surrounding artificial intelligence in a real-world context.

The episode also explores themes around incel culture through a line written by Davies in which Belinda refers to the planet as "Planet of the Incels". Series star Varada Sethu said that conversations about this topic were held among the production team, and she and co-star Ncuti Gatwa found addressing it from "a place of compassion" very interesting".

The scene that introduces Belinda's roommates was not included in the original script but added to a rewritten version months after the initial production block had concluded, as Davies ultimately decided to add them because he felt it unrealistic for a young working nurse to be able to afford a large house by herself.

=== Casting ===
The episode stars Gatwa as the fifteenth incarnation of The Doctor and introduces Sethu as his companion, Belinda Chandra. Sethu had previously played a separate character, Mundy Flynn, in the fourteenth series episode "Boom" (2024). Mundy, it is revealed in "The Robot Revolution", is a distant descendant of Belinda. Anita Dobson reprised her role as Mrs. Flood, an enigmatic character who was first introduced in "The Church on Ruby Road" (2023) and reappeared in the previous series. Alan Budd (the episode's antagonist) was portrayed by Jonny Green, who formerly voiced characters in various Doctor Who and Torchwood audio dramas.

Other members of the guest cast included Max Parker, Jeff Kunjumon, Evelyn Miller, and Caleb Hughes, playing the characters of Manny, Stefan, Sasha, and Scoley, respectively. Two of the robots were manoeuvred by puppeteers Stephen Love and Robert Strange, who had previously held similar responsibilities as Wrarth Warriors in "The Star Beast" (2023), Strange doing the same for the Bogeyman costume in the 2024 episode "Space Babies".

=== Production design and filming ===
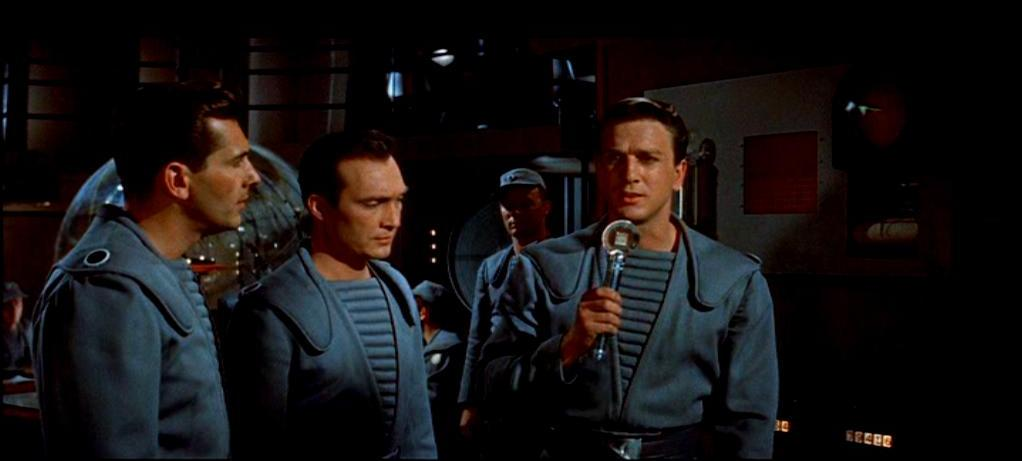
Screenshot from Forbidden Planet

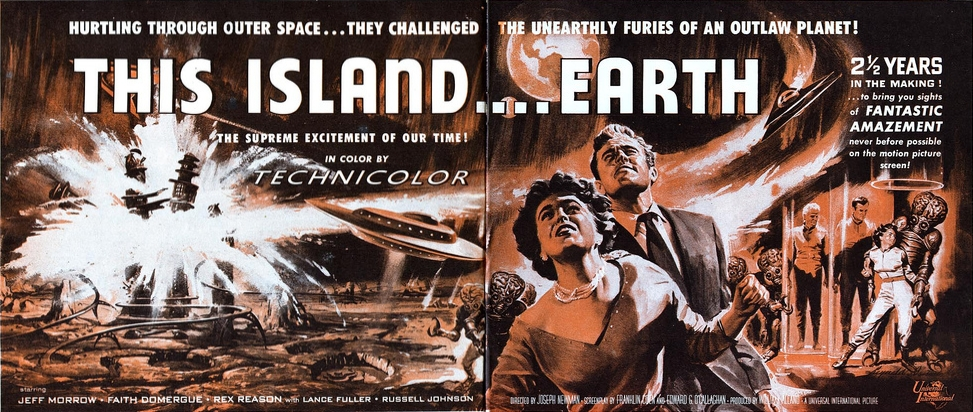
Promotional poster for This Island Earth

The set design team used American science fiction films Forbidden Planet and This Island Earth as references.

Set design began at Wolf Studios Wales in October 2023. Production designer Phil Sims said he and Davies took inspiration from American science fiction films Forbidden Planet and This Island Earth when conceiving the sets. The sets were created with a retrofuturistic appearance influenced by the 1950s. The special effects company Millennium FX designed the larger robot costumes over the course of eight weeks. The costumes were first created digitally and split into 34 different pieces for 3D printing, then assembled with glue and finished with silicon and fibreglass.

The polishing robot in the episode responsible for cleaning, dubbed Scoot by the production team, was constructed with a similar 1950s aesthetic, primarily based on cars and home appliances of the time period. Michael van Kesteren, the episode's prop designer, specifically named the Chevrolet Bel Air and Fiat 500 as examples of vehicles. The robot was also based on several different characters, such as WALL-E, Johnny 5, R2-D2, and other associated characters.

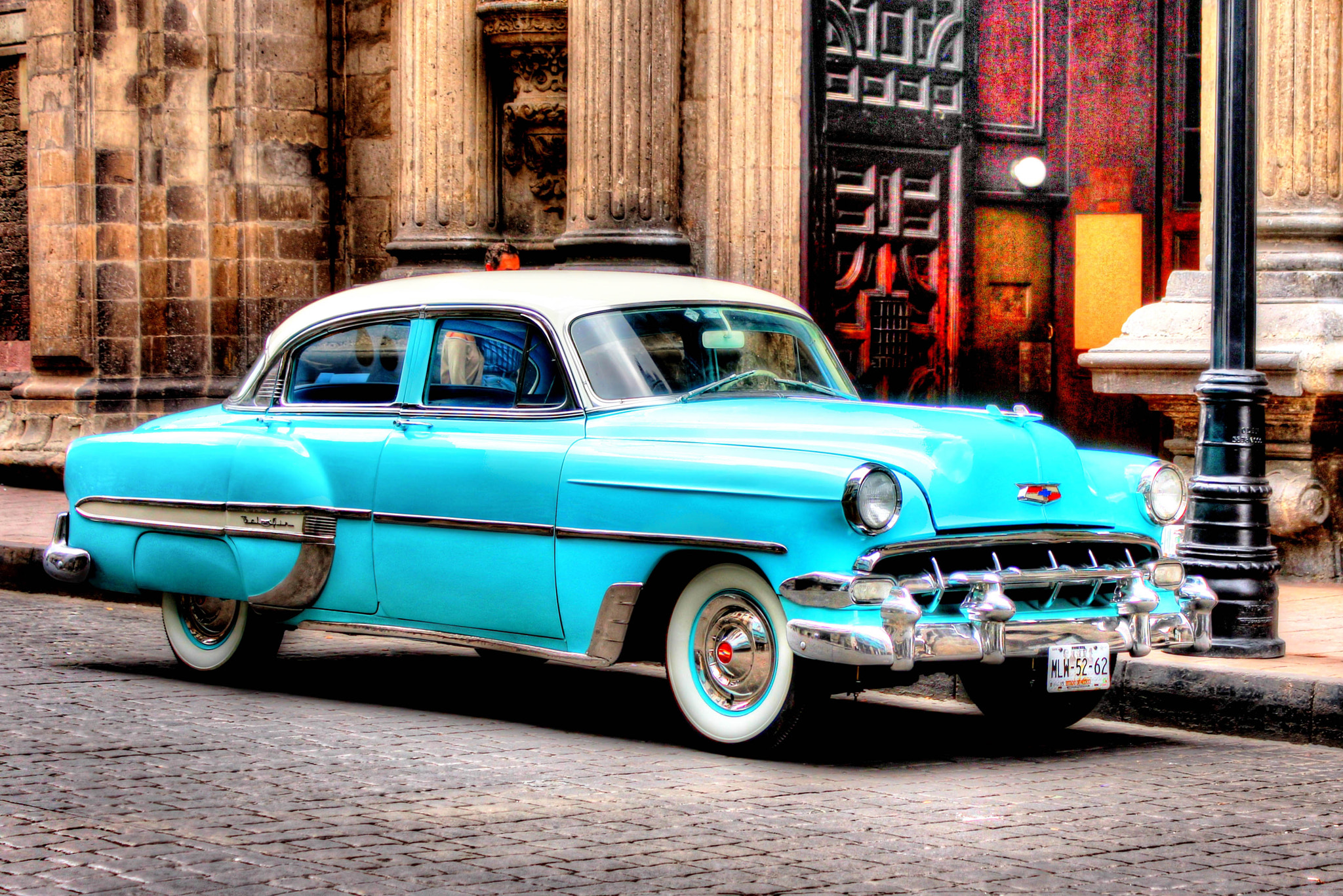
1954 Chevrolet Bel Air

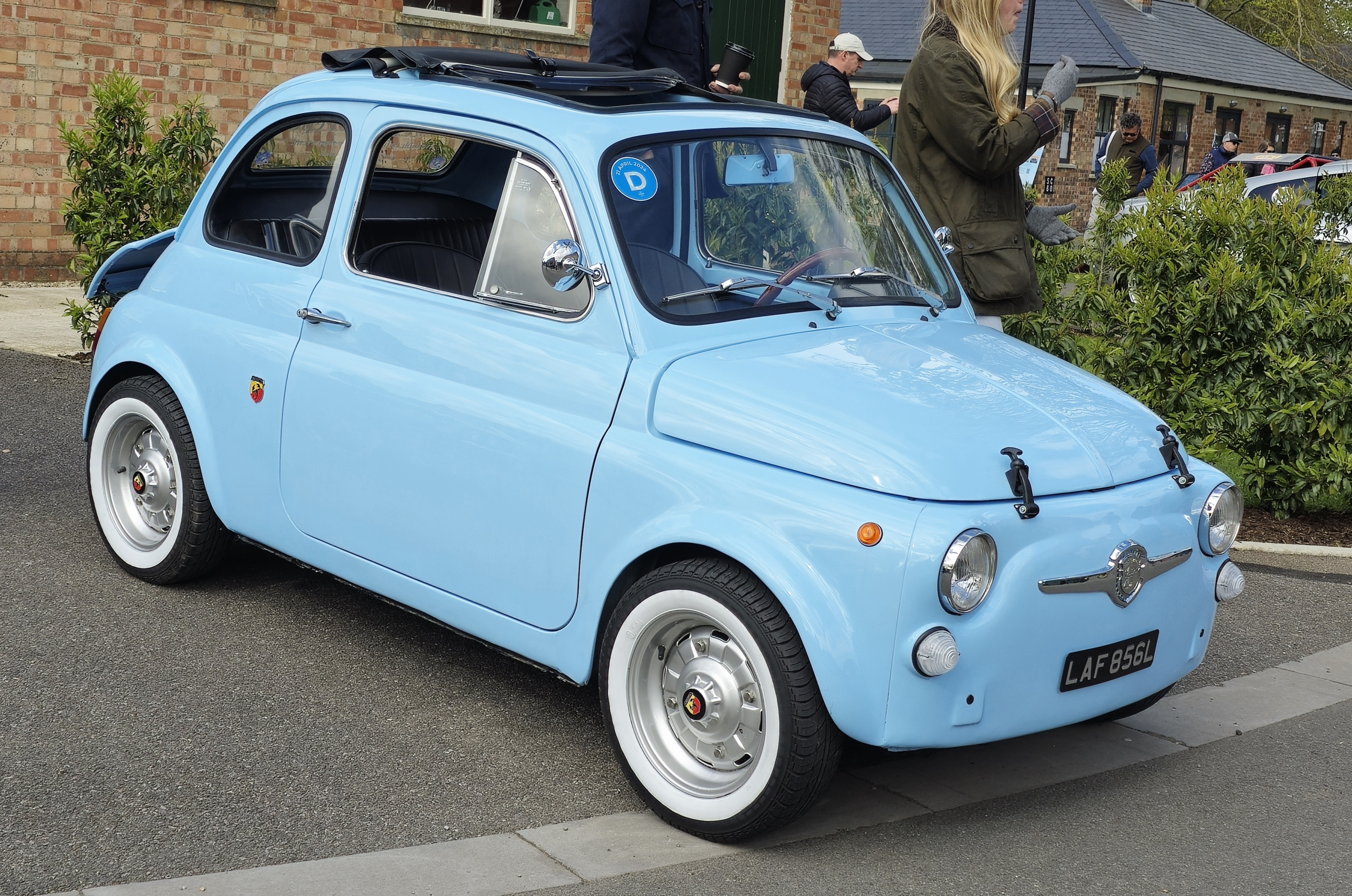
1972 Fiat 500

Michael van Kesteren attributed a prop design to the Chevrolet Bel Air and Fiat 500.

Scoot was given unique omni wheels that allowed it to move laterally as well as straight ahead, as the designers wanted the robot to have a unique range of motion compared to other robots of similar size. The robot was also granted a moveable eye and small puppeteered arms in order to convey more emotion. Due to the prop's interior mechanics, two versions of it were produced: one that could pass freely around the set, the other for the actors to interact with.

The AI Generator was designed to appear large and imposing, with the set and art design teams collaborating to determine where Alan would be inside the machine. The set for the throne room, where Belinda is initially brought in the episode, was re-used for the set that had contained AI Generator's room on Stage 3 at Wolf Studios Wales. The design team placed the "head" of the Generator's design just below the centerpiece of the room in order to create the illusion that the room acted like a crown for the Generator and that the room was an extension of him.

The episode, directed by Peter Hoar, was recorded in the second filming block of Series 15 along with the fourth episode "Lucky Day". Location filming occurred in November 2023 in Roath, Cardiff, while soundstage filming also took place at Wolf Studios Wales in December 2023. Principal photography was completed by the end of December.

The episode's original opening moments would have featured Belinda's family, but Davies decided to cut this scene as he felt that "a story about Belinda having a star named after her should start with Belinda having the star named after her". Pick-up and cutaway shots introducing her roommates were recorded while a later episode was in production. A hallway with a doorway were constructed for these, with Davies saying he "had to be careful and kind to the budget".

== Broadcast and reception ==
Professional ratings
Aggregate scores
Source	Rating
Rotten Tomatoes (Tomatometer)	100%
Rotten Tomatoes (Average Score)	6.80/10
Review scores
Source	Rating
The A.V. Club	B−
Bleeding Cool	8/10
The Daily Telegraph	3/5 stars
Empire	3/5 stars
GamesRadar+	4/5 stars
The Guardian	3/5 stars
i	3/5 stars
IGN	6/10
The Independent	4/5 stars
Evening Standard	4/5 stars
Vulture	3/5 stars

=== Release ===
An advanced press screening for "The Robot Revolution" occurred on 31 March 2025. The episode was simultaneously released on BBC iPlayer at 8 a.m. British Summer Time (BST) in the United Kingdom and on Disney+ in the United States at 12 a.m. Pacific Daylight Time on 12 April. A BBC One broadcast followed later in the day at 6:50 p.m. BST. Disney also handled international distribution of the episode.

=== Ratings ===
Overnight viewing figures estimated that the episode was watched by 2 million people on its BBC One broadcast, making it the second most-watched programme of the night on BBC One behind the finale of Gladiators series 2, as well as the fourth most-watched programme of the day. The episode received a total of 3.56 million consolidated viewers across 7 days, and a total of 4.34 million consolidated viewers across 28 days.

=== Critical reception ===
On the review aggregator website Rotten Tomatoes, 100% of 15 critics' reviews are positive, with an average rating of 6.80/10. Will Salmon with GamesRadar+ highlighted the setting and design of the episode, but criticised it for being "light" in plot and weight and for confusing plot points toward its end. Writing for Den of Geek, Stefan Mohamed highlighted the Doctor's characterisation and the episode's new visual and directorial techniques, but criticised Sasha 55's death as a weak narrative moment, as also Alan's antagonistic role. Yahoo! Entertainment's Roxy Simmons thought the episode enjoyable but found it made very little impact on the audience. He also considered its social commentary unsubtle.

The Independent author Ed Power praised the Doctor's characterisation and the episode's fun nature, but felt that elements of Alan's characterisation as a "nerdy" character would receive negative reception and that Sasha 55's death was unnecessary for the plot. IGN critic Robert Anderson criticised the episode for feeling "shallow". He also disliked the plot twist of Alan being the AI Generator. Reviewing the episode for The Guardian, Jack Seale highlighted the episode's re-introduction of the Doctor's character and the inclusion of topical issues, but criticised the twists involving the AI Generator as well as the execution of the episode's message. Michael Hogan, penning a review for The Daily Telegraph, wrote that some of the episode's social commentary regarding gender and artificial intelligence were not well executed and felt jarring given the episode's time slot.Mashable's Chris Taylor, in a negative review, commented that as far as the social commentary of the episode, it moved too fast to properly critique any particular aspect.

Belinda's characterisation was the subject of significant discussion in reviews of the episode. Salmon, in his review, stated that unlike the Doctor's prior companion Ruby Sunday, Belinda was able to provide a strong contrast to his characterisation as she was "tough and a straight talker" while kind and likeable like Ruby. Other writers concurred, highlighting Belinda's dynamic with the Doctor as a strong point in the episode that indicated promise for her character as the season progressed. Simmons also found Belinda a likeable character, though opined that some viewers might connect immediately with her less easily due to her characterisation. Taylor, in contrast to other reviewers, argued that Belinda's characterisation was weak, and that she lacked a sense of purpose compared to other past companions of the Doctor. Stefan Mohamed praised the episode and performances but criticised some aspects of the writing, calling Sasha 55 an unnecessary character and felt the Doctor's grief over her death to be comical, and felt Alan to be a weak villain, even criticizing Belinda's treatment. Adi Tantimedh from Bleeding Cool gave the episode a 7/10, also panning Sasha's death and the use of Alan as a villain, but ultimately felt the episode to be " a solid, if not sensational, start".

== In print ==
The Robot Revolution
- Author: Una McCormack
- Cover artist: Dan Liles
- Series: Doctor Who book: Target novelisations
- Publisher: BBC Books
- Publication date: 10 July 2025
- Pages: 192
- ISBN: 9781785949548

A novelisation of the episode was written by Una McCormack and was released on 10 July 2025 as part of the Target Collection. The audiobook will be read by Sethu and the cover was designed by Dan Liles.
