= Doctor Who series 15 =

2025 season of British sci-fi TV series

Doctor Who
- Series 15
- DVD box set cover art
- Showrunner: Russell T Davies
- Starring: Ncuti Gatwa; Varada Sethu; Millie Gibson
- No. of stories: 7
- No. of episodes: 8 (+1 special)

Release
- Original network: BBC One; Disney+
- Original release: 12 April – 31 May 2025

Series chronology
- ← Previous; Series 14

The fifteenth series of the British science fiction television programme Doctor Who premiered on 12 April 2025. This series is also known as "Season Two" following the production changes and the acquisition of Doctor Who's international broadcasting rights by Disney+ prior to the previous series. It is the sixth and final series led by Russell T Davies as head writer and executive producer and the second since his return to the show in 2023, having previously worked on it from 2005 to 2010. This series is the fifteenth to air following the programme's revival in 2005, and is the forty-first season overall.

This is the second and final series to star Ncuti Gatwa as the Fifteenth Doctor, an incarnation of the Doctor, an alien Time Lord who travels through time and space in the TARDIS, which appears to be a British police box from the outside. Varada Sethu joins the series as new companion Belinda Chandra, with Millie Gibson also featuring as Ruby Sunday, the previous series' companion, for her second and final series in the role. The series was preceded by a Christmas episode in December 2024, written by former showrunner and head writer Steven Moffat, where Nicola Coughlan appears as one-off companion, Joy Almondo.

The series consists of eight episodes, directed by Alex Sanjiv Pillai, Peter Hoar, Amanda Brotchie, Ben A. Williams, and Makalla McPherson. Alongside Davies, who wrote four episodes and co-wrote a further one, the writers include Juno Dawson, Inua Ellams, Pete McTighe, and Sharma Angel-Walfall. Filming began in October 2023 and concluded in May 2024. Following the airing of the series, it was announced that without further backing from Disney+, a planned succeeding special had been cancelled, and Davies departed from his role as showrunner, with the BBC planning a competitive tender process for a future series.

== Episodes ==
No. story	No. in series	Title	Directed by	Written by	Original release date (Note: The first seven episodes for the fifteenth series were released simultaneously at 8 a.m. BST in the United Kingdom on BBC iPlayer (followed by a 7 p.m. BBC One broadcast the same day), and at 12 a.m. PT in the United States on Disney+. The final episode was released simultaneously at 7 p.m. BST in the United Kingdom on BBC iPlayer and BBC One, and at 11 a.m. PT in the United States on Disney+.)	UK viewers (millions)	AI
Special
312	–	"Joy to the World"	Alex Sanjiv Pillai	Steven Moffat	25 December 2024	6.33	76
The Doctor arrives at the Time Hotel, an establishment that allows visits to historical points. The Doctor enlists the aid of Trev, a hotel employee, as he investigates a mysterious briefcase. Trev's Silurian manager arrives in Joy Almondo's hotel room with the briefcase and the Doctor following him. The briefcase takes control of Joy, and the Doctor finds a strange device inside about to disintegrate Joy; suddenly a Doctor from the future arrives from the Time Hotel with the required code. The future Doctor returns to the Time Hotel with Joy, stranding the current Doctor. He takes a job working at the hotel, befriending the manager Anita, awaiting an opportunity to get back to the Time Hotel, which he does a year later. He opens a door to the distant past, where he frees Joy by provoking her anger. The briefcase, of Villengard origin, is to be used to create an energy source. Trev, who connected psychically to Villengard's system before he died, reveals the briefcase's location. The Doctor opens it, but Joy lets the star seed enter her. Joy pilots it into space, where it detonates safely as the Star of Bethlehem, and the star gives hope and comfort to those who see it.
Series
313	1	"The Robot Revolution"	Peter Hoar	Russell T Davies	12 April 2025	3.56	–
Robots abduct nurse Belinda Chandra, whose ex-boyfriend Alan Budd named their system's star after her. Caught in a time fracture as he pursues them, the Doctor arrives six months earlier, finding the robots have enslaved the natives, and joins a rebel group, rescuing Belinda before the robots can augment her into their cyborg queen. Belinda surrenders to protect the rebels and discovers the robots are being controlled by Alan, who was also abducted, although the time fracture caused the robots to bring him to Missbelindachandra I in 2015, causing the revolution in the first place. Alan has a future copy of Belinda's star certificate, which was inexplicably sent back five thousand years and formed the basis of the planet's society. Belinda touches the present copy with the future copy, triggering a reaction that kills Alan and restores the robots to normal, thus liberating the natives. The Doctor agrees to return Belinda home to Earth, but the TARDIS is repelled from landing in 2025.
314	2	"Lux"	Amanda Brotchie	Russell T Davies	19 April 2025	3.04	–
The Doctor attempts to take Belinda home via an indirect route, causing them to land in Miami in 1952, where they investigate the disappearance of fifteen people at an abandoned cinema. Inside, they encounter Mr Ring-a-Ding, a cartoon character who has been possessed by Lux Imperator, the God of Light and a member of the Pantheon of Discord. Lux traps the pair inside a film reel, subjecting them to false cinematic realities as they try to escape, including one where they meet Doctor Who fans. Upon finally escaping, Lux imprisons the Doctor, hoping to steal his regeneration energy to create a body that can survive the world outside the cinema, but is defeated when Belinda convinces the theatre's owner to set the film reels alight, causing an explosion that lets sunlight pour into the cinema. Exposed in his light form, Lux expands infinitely until he becomes one with the universe and his fifteen victims return unharmed.
315	3	"The Well"	Amanda Brotchie	Russell T Davies & Sharma Angel-Walfall	26 April 2025	3.24	–
The Doctor and Belinda arrive on a planet 500,000 years in the future, where an expedition is investigating a mining colony that has gone silent. A deaf cook named Aliss is the only person left alive, after a mysterious entity emerged from the mining well and killed the crew. The entity is concealing itself behind Aliss, and anyone who moves directly behind her is killed. The Doctor realizes that this is the planet formerly known as Midnight and the entity is one that he previously encountered. (Note: As seen in "Midnight" (2008)) Aliss explains that the entity causes the person it is hiding behind to attack others, but her deafness appears to protect her from its influence. But anyone who kills the entity's host becomes the new host. Several troopers rebel against the captain, Shaya, but many are killed by the entity. Aliss is freed when the Doctor forces the monster to see its reflection, but the entity moves behind Belinda before she can escape. Shaya non-fatally shoots Belinda to force the entity to transfer to her and then dives into the well, allowing the others to escape. Back onboard the TARDIS, Belinda tells the Doctor that none of the troopers had ever heard of Earth, leaving troubling implications. Meanwhile, one of the troopers believes she sees something behind another's back.
316	4	"Lucky Day"	Peter Hoar	Pete McTighe	3 May 2025	2.83	–
On New Year's Day, 2007, 8-year-old Conrad Clark encounters the Doctor setting up a homing device, the Vindicator, alongside Belinda, leading to his obsession with aliens. In 2024, Conrad again sees the TARDIS and is saved by the Doctor and Ruby Sunday from a creature called the Shreek. A year later, Conrad seeks out Ruby, who is still adjusting to normal life, and invites her to talk on his podcast about her experiences with the Doctor. The two begin dating. Ruby believes the Shreek, which uses bodily secretions to mark its prey, is after Conrad and gives him an antidote that blocks the secretions. In addition, UNIT has captured the creature. It turns out that Conrad is leader of a group of conspiracy theorists who want to publicly discredit UNIT. His livestream of UNIT's confrontation with two phony Shreek leads to public backlash against UNIT. When Conrad breaks into UNIT Tower, Kate releases the Shreek, and the terrified Conrad admits that he was wrong. His confession is seen by millions on the livestream he was broadcasting. Devastated by his betrayal, Ruby tells Kate she needs to take time to herself to recover. An earlier version of the Doctor pulls the imprisoned Conrad into the TARDIS to berate him for his actions. He tells an unrepentant Conrad about his own dismal future. After he is returned to prison, Conrad is sprung by Mrs Flood.
317	5	"The Story & the Engine"	Makalla McPherson	Inua Ellams	10 May 2025	2.71	–
The Doctor and Belinda arrive in 2019 Lagos to boost the Vindicator's signal. When the Doctor stops by his friend, Omo the barbershop owner, for a haircut, two people named the Barber and Abena trap the Doctor inside and ask him for stories. The TARDIS alerts Belinda to trouble and directs her to the barbershop. The Barber tells the Doctor that he was the creator behind much of humankind's mythology. But when the web of stories expanded to the point where he was no longer needed, the gods banished him from their dimension. Out of revenge, the Barber built the Story Engine, a god-killing device which feeds on stories, and took over Omo's barbershop. Initially recognizing Abena, the Doctor remembers meeting her in his Fugitive incarnation and realises her anger is because she was left behind. Belinda persuades Abena to braid a route to the Engine's power source into the Doctor's hair, affording his escape. The Doctor overloads the Engine with his memories, defeating but then redeeming the Barber. Omo retires and convinces the Barber to remain as the shop's manager before the Doctor leaves.
318	6	"The Interstellar Song Contest"	Ben A. Williams	Juno Dawson	17 May 2025	3.79	–
In 2925, the Doctor and Belinda are attending the Interstellar Song Contest – evolved from Earth's Eurovision Song Contest – when two terrorists from the planet Hellia remove the station's oxygen shield, propelling the Doctor and 100,000 people in the audience into deep space, where they begin to freeze. However, before he can die, the Doctor is awoken by a psychic message from his granddaughter Susan Foreman, and returns to the station, where he vengefully shuts down the terror plot before the Hellians can broadcast a deadly wave to the programme's trillions of viewers across the universe. The live audience members are saved and revived by the Doctor and station staff using cryogenic technology. Just before leaving to take Belinda home, the Doctor and Belinda are informed by a hologram of Graham Norton that the Earth ended on 24 May 2025 – the day Belinda left. The TARDIS finally makes it to that date, only to have the doors explode inwards. After they depart, Mrs Flood is the last of the attendees to be revived. Her body has been fatally damaged in space, but she bi-generates, becoming two women who reveal themselves to be The Rani. The two Ranis prepare the next step in their plan.
319a	7	"Wish World"	Alex Sanjiv Pillai	Russell T Davies	24 May 2025	3.16	–
In Bavaria, 1865, the Rani seizes a seventh son of a seventh son of a seventh son, an incarnation of the infant God of Wishes, Desiderium. On 23 May 2025, the Doctor and Belinda wake up in their home, believing themselves to be a married couple. After breakfast with their "daughter", Poppy, they are visited by Ruby Sunday, who expresses doubts in their seemingly perfect world. Both the Doctor and Belinda start having doubts about the reality around them following the visit. Later, the Doctor receives a message from Rogue, telling him he is caught in a trap. After the Doctor realizes reality is wrong, he and Belinda are brought to the Bone Palace by the Rani. Here, the Doctor learns the world was changed by Conrad Clark to be his perfect vision, using the power of Desiderium and the Vindicator. The Rani reveals that doubt from the Doctor and humanity is being used by her in order to break reality, thus releasing Omega, the founder of the Time Lords, from an alternate dimension, the Underverse. Remembering everything, the Doctor tries to stop her, but is locked out of the Bone Palace, with Belinda imprisoned. Mrs. Flood and the Rani prepare for the release of Omega, as the fake reality crumbles beneath them amid purple fire, while the clock hits midnight, and the start of 24 May: the day Earth dies.
319b	8	"The Reality War"	Alex Sanjiv Pillai	Russell T Davies	31 May 2025	3.48	–
The Doctor is rescued by Anita who pulls him into the Time Hotel as time resets to 23 May 2025. With Anita's help, the Doctor is able to restore the memories of UNIT and Belinda before the Rani reveals that the surviving Time Lords are sterile; she intends to use Omega as a gene bank to rebirth their race. The Doctor confronts the Rani as Omega is released in the form of a massive beast who devours the bi-generated Rani; Mrs Flood escapes as the Doctor uses the Vindicator to force Omega back into the Underverse. Ruby uses Desiderium's power to give Conrad a new life and restore reality, but at the cost of Poppy being erased, while the baby god is adopted by Carla Sunday. Despite the Thirteenth Doctor, who was temporarily shifted out of her timeline, trying to talk him out of it, the Doctor deliberately triggers his next regeneration and uses its power to shift reality so that Poppy is recreated as Belinda's daughter. After saying goodbye to Belinda and Poppy, the Doctor regenerates into a body similar to his previous companion Rose Tyler.

== Casting ==
=== Main characters ===
Ncuti Gatwa confirmed that he would return for a second series in July 2023. In November 2023, it was announced that Nicola Coughlan would appear as the companion in the 2024 Christmas special. Millie Gibson was revealed to be filming for her second series in November 2023, though reports emerged in January 2024 that Gibson would be leaving the show after the fourteenth series, to be replaced by Varada Sethu. However, in April 2024 it was announced that Gibson and Sethu would appear concurrently throughout the series. Subsequent promotional material foregrounded Gatwa and Sethu as the series' "TARDIS team", highlighting them as the first to consist solely of people of colour, with Gibson described as an "outgoing series regular". Gibson appeared in the fourth episode, "Lucky Day", and the seventh and eighth episodes, "Wish World" / "The Reality War". Sethu made a surprise appearance in the series prior in "Boom" (2024) as Mundy Flynn before her debut as the new companion. On 27 July, it was announced at San Diego Comic-Con that Sethu's character would be called Belinda Chandra. It is later revealed in "The Robot Revolution" that Mundy is a descendant of Belinda. Gatwa departed his lead role as the Fifteenth Doctor following the series' conclusion, citing mental and physical health reasons.

=== Recurring and guest characters ===
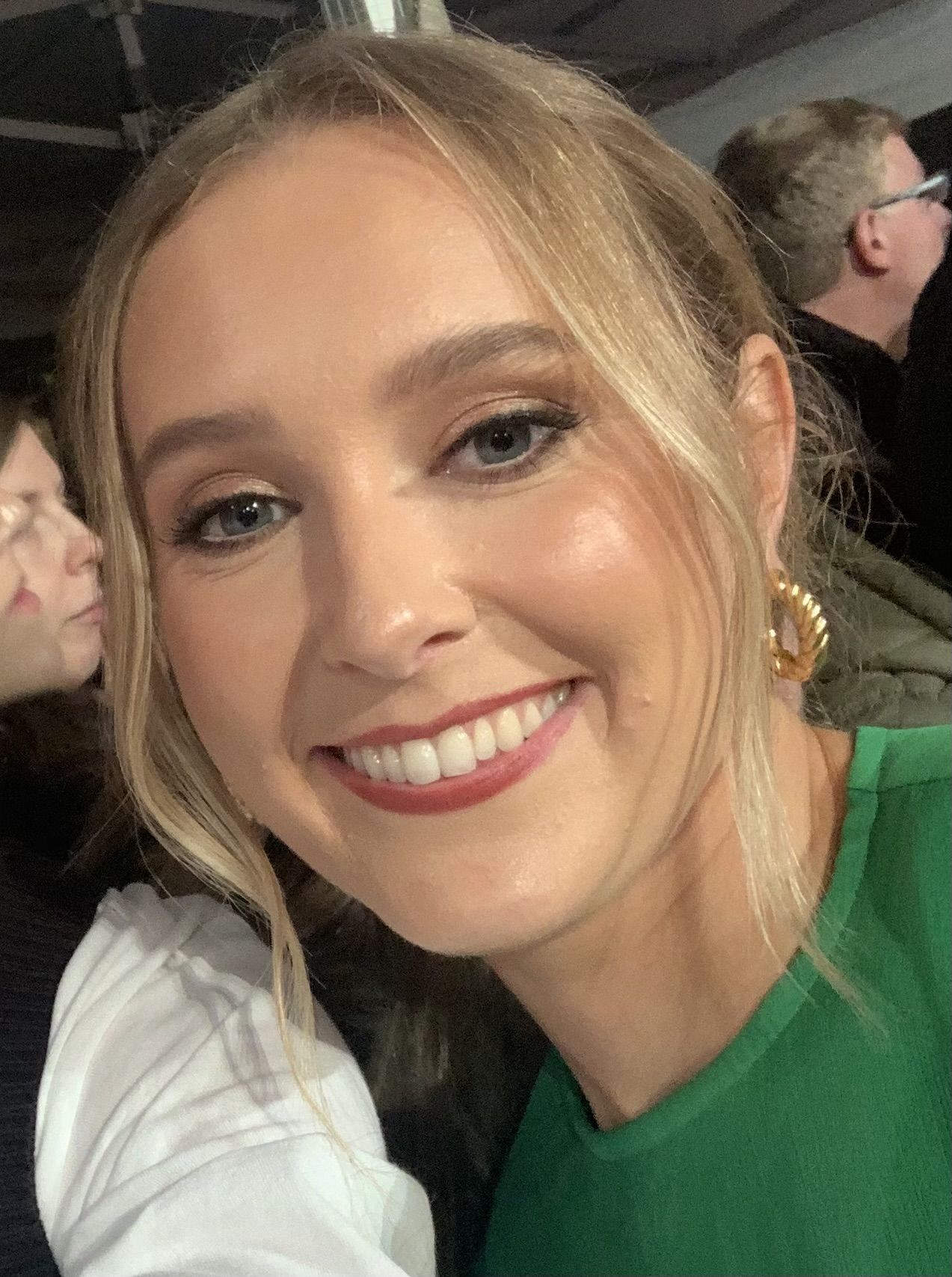
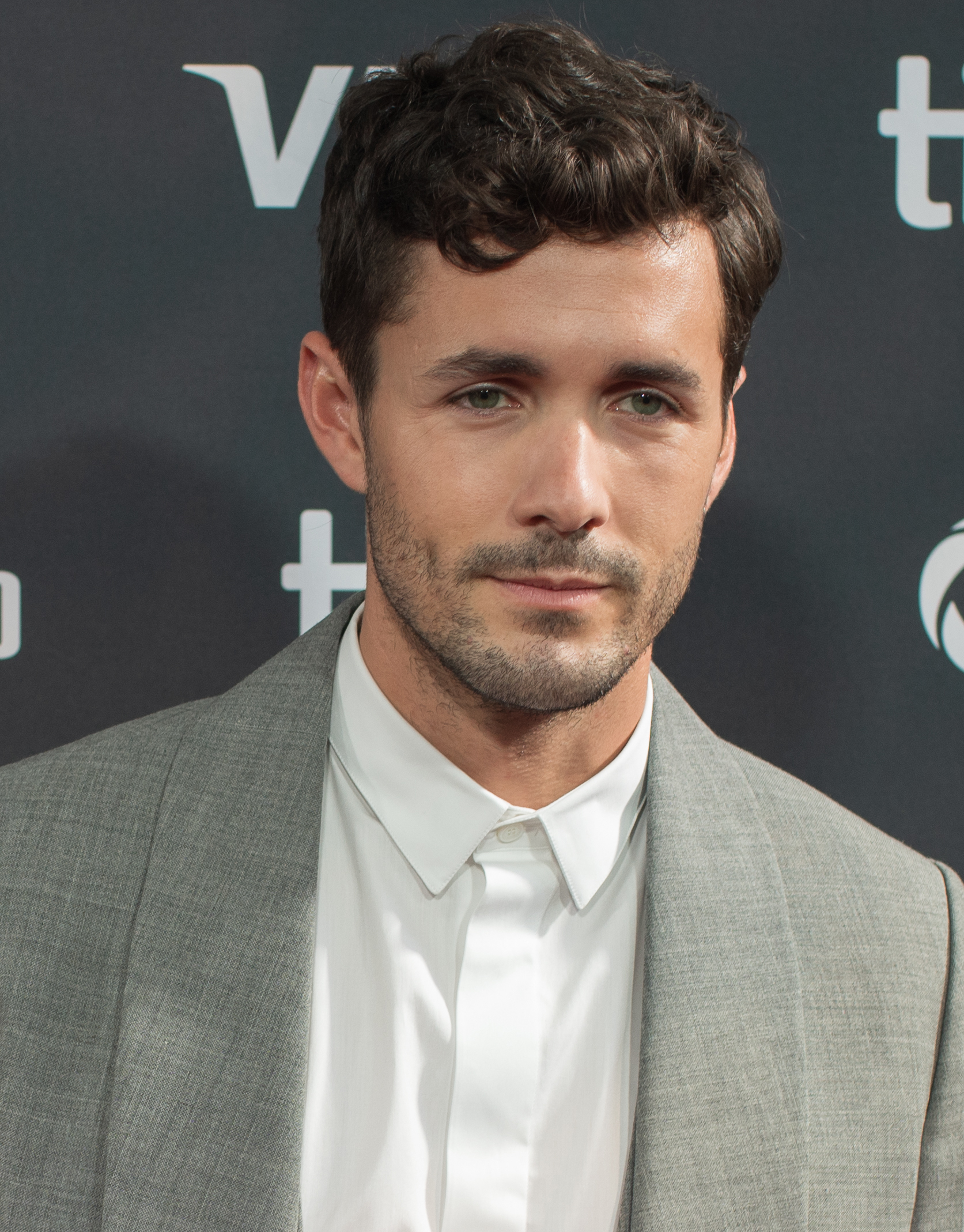
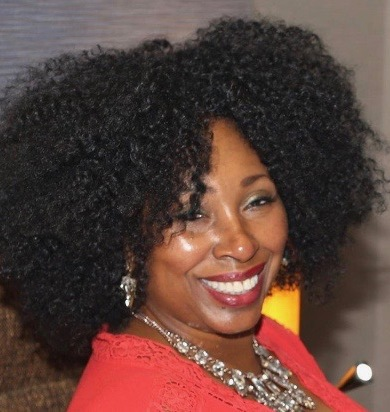
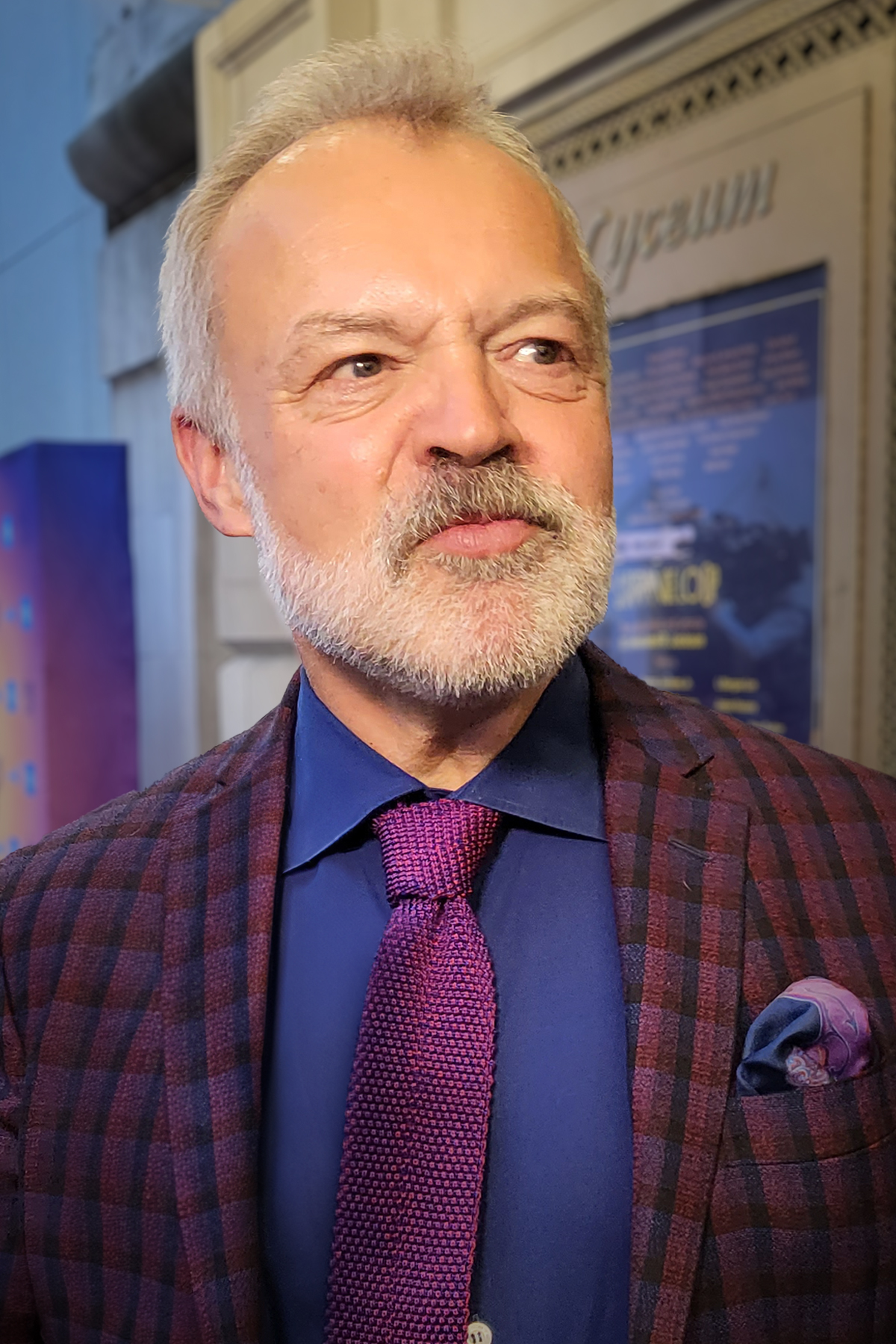
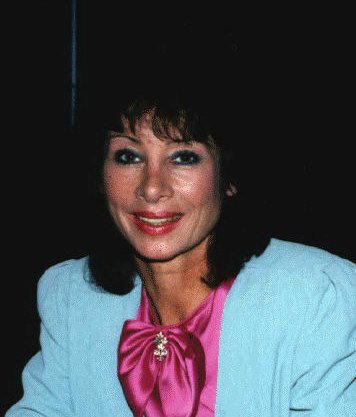
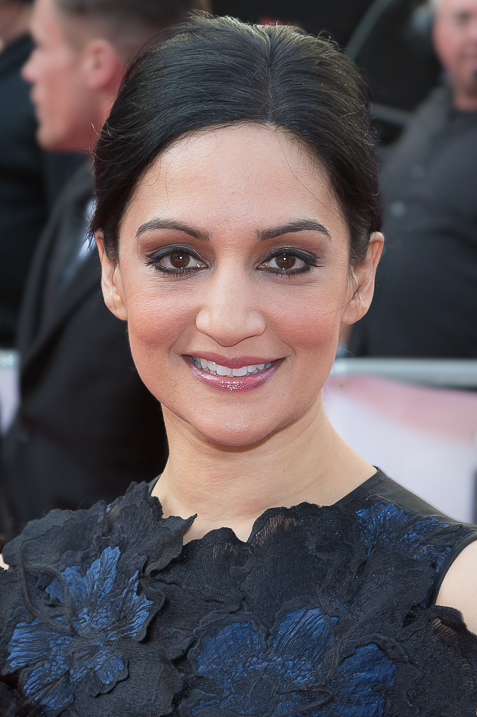
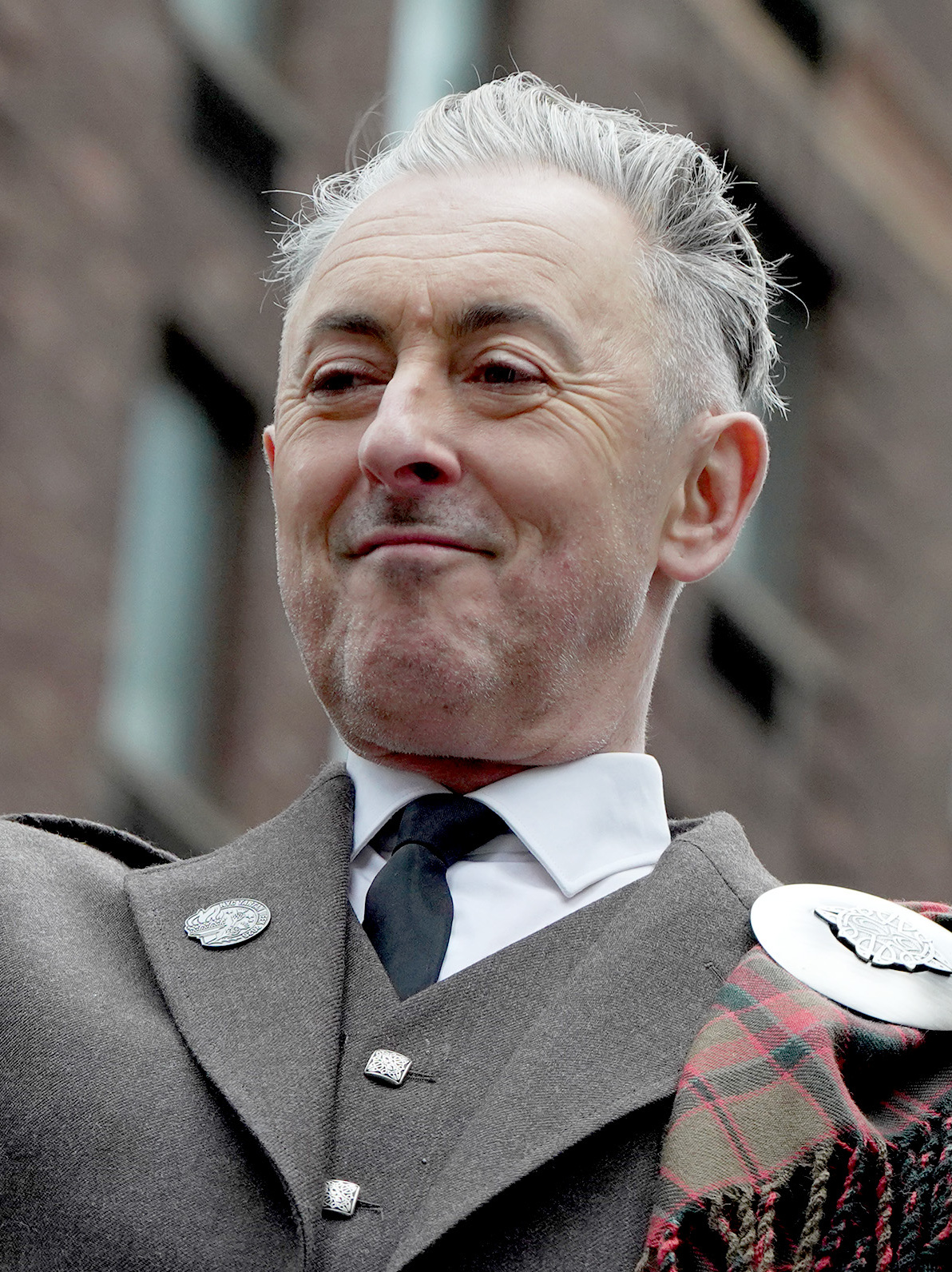
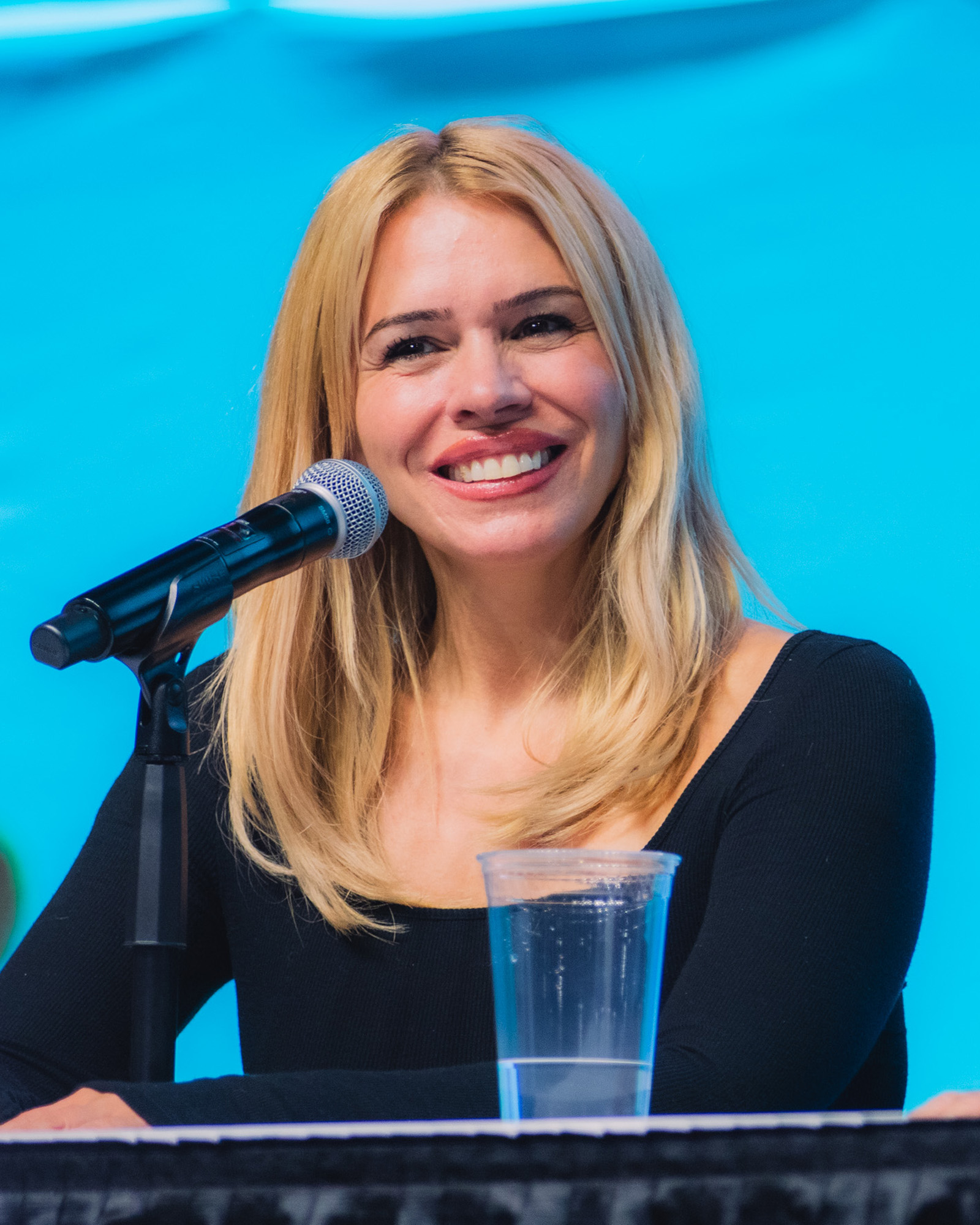
Multiple actors held supporting roles in the series.

Left to right, top to bottom: Rose Ayling-Ellis, Jonah Hauer-King, Jo Martin, Graham Norton, Carole Ann Ford, Archie Panjabi, Alan Cumming, and Billie Piper.

Alan Cumming guest starred in "Lux" as a cartoon character named "Mr Ring-a-Ding"; he had previously appeared in the show as King James VI in "The Witchfinders" (2018). Davies stated that only Cumming could give the character "so much wit, malice, danger and fun". Rose Ayling-Ellis and Christopher Chung appears in "The Well" as characters Aliss and Cassio, respectively. Jonah Hauer-King portrayed Conrad in "Lucky Day", a podcaster and Ruby's boyfriend. Jemma Redgrave also returned as Kate Lethbridge-Stewart in the same episode. Following the episode's broadcast, Gibson revealed in an interview that Hauer-King would also appear later on in the series. Jo Martin reprises her role as the Fugitive Doctor in "The Story & the Engine". Showrunner Russell T Davies stated that because the episode explored the Doctor's ethnicity it "felt like Jo Martin was missing" and that he wanted to "acknowledge her" and show "she still exists". On 2 March, following the release of the series trailer, Rylan Clark was announced to be in the series, presenting an intergalactic song competition in "The Interstellar Song Contest", an episode inspired by the Eurovision Song Contest which also stars Graham Norton. In the same episode, Freddie Fox appears as a villain, as well as Kadiff Kirwan and Charlie Condou, and Carole Ann Ford reprised her role as Susan Foreman, last appearing in the programme over 30 years prior in Dimensions in Time.

Anita Dobson appears in every episode of the series as Mrs Flood; in the sixth episode, her true identity is revealed to be The Rani, a villainous Time Lord. Archie Panjabi was introduced as another incarnation of the Rani through a bi-generation process. Bonnie Langford returns as Mel Bush in "Wish World", as well as Jonathan Groff as Rogue in a cameo. Jodie Whittaker reprised her role as the Thirteenth Doctor in a surprise cameo in "The Reality War". Billie Piper also returned to Doctor Who after previously portraying the Doctor's companion Rose Tyler last appearing in the 2013 fiftieth anniversary special, "The Day of the Doctor", when the Fifteenth Doctor regenerates into a character portrayed by her at the end of the episode. While Piper's official role remains undisclosed, with the closing credits merely reading "Introducing Billie Piper", some sources assumed her to be taking on the Doctor's sixteenth incarnation.

== Production ==
=== Development ===
In October 2022, it was announced that the revival's fifteenth series would be produced, alongside the prior series, in collaboration with Disney Branded Television. Series fifteen would be the final series produced in collaboration with Disney prior to them backing out of the partnership following the series' airing. The series is produced by Bad Wolf and BBC Studios, with the series also being referred to as season two following the prior season's rename to season one. Similar to the fourteenth series, the fifteenth series consists of a Christmas special followed by eight regular episodes, consisting of six standalone episodes and a two-part finale, with an additional Christmas special to air in late 2025 not being commissioned along the series. The series' release date was confirmed for 12 April 2025, with eight episodes airing weekly as part of the series. The episodes' titles were teased and released to fans a month prior to their airing.

Russell T Davies returns from the prior series as showrunner and executive producer. Additional executive producers for the series include Julie Gardner, Jane Tranter, Phil Collinson, and Joel Collins. Steven Moffat, who wrote Christmas special "Joy to the World", executive produced the story.

=== Writing ===
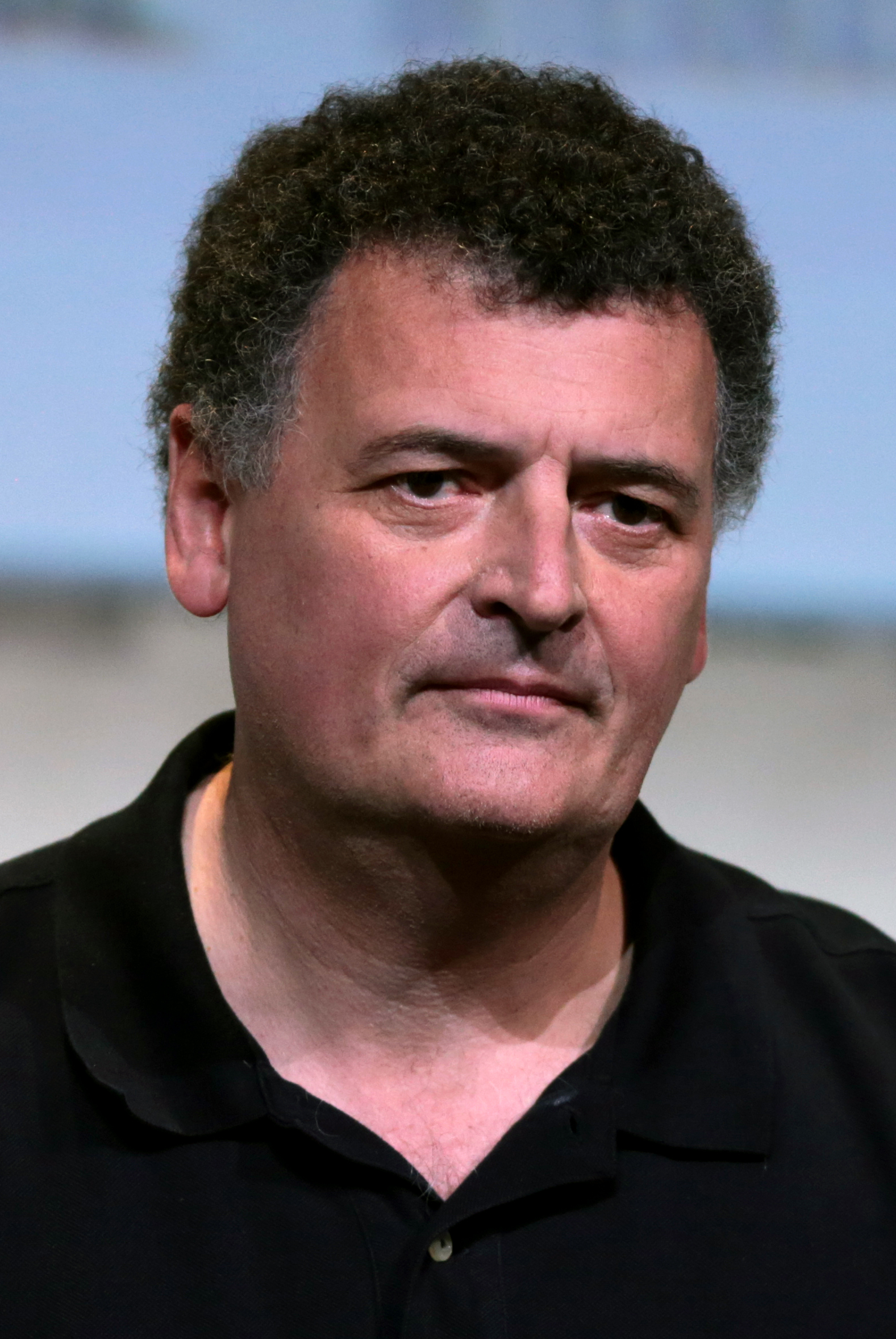
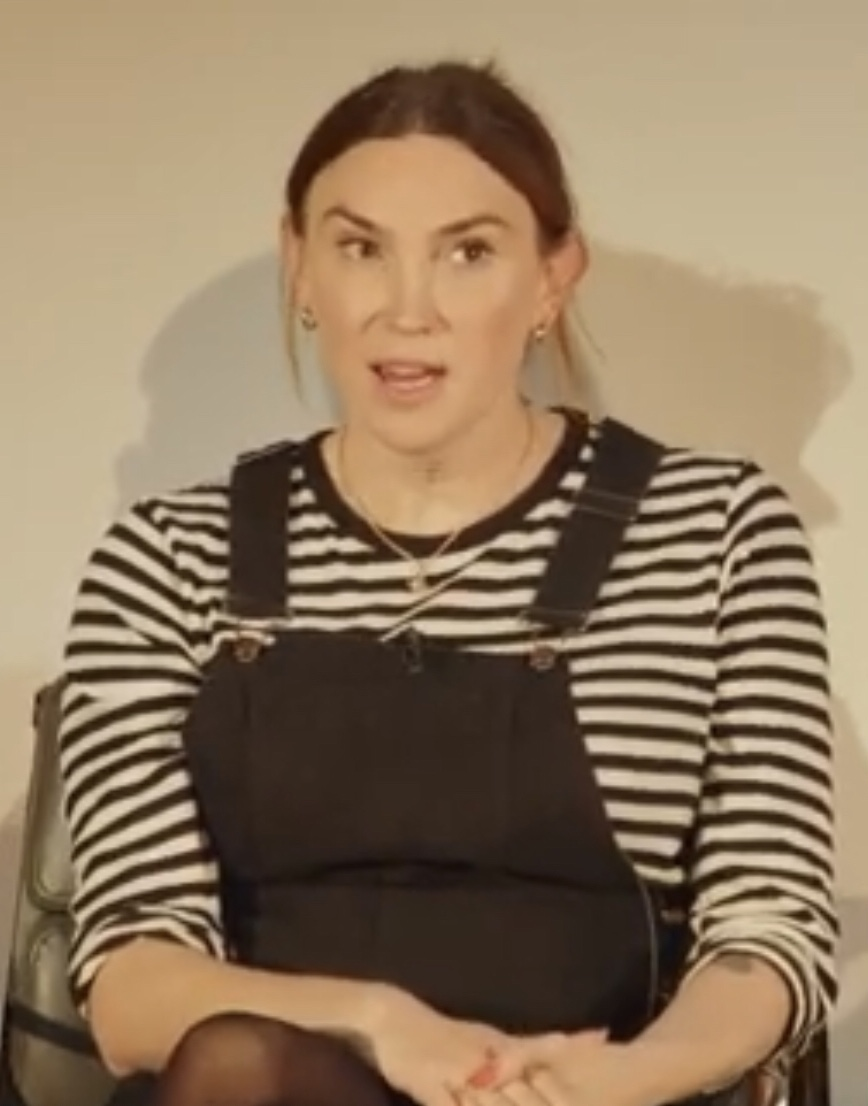
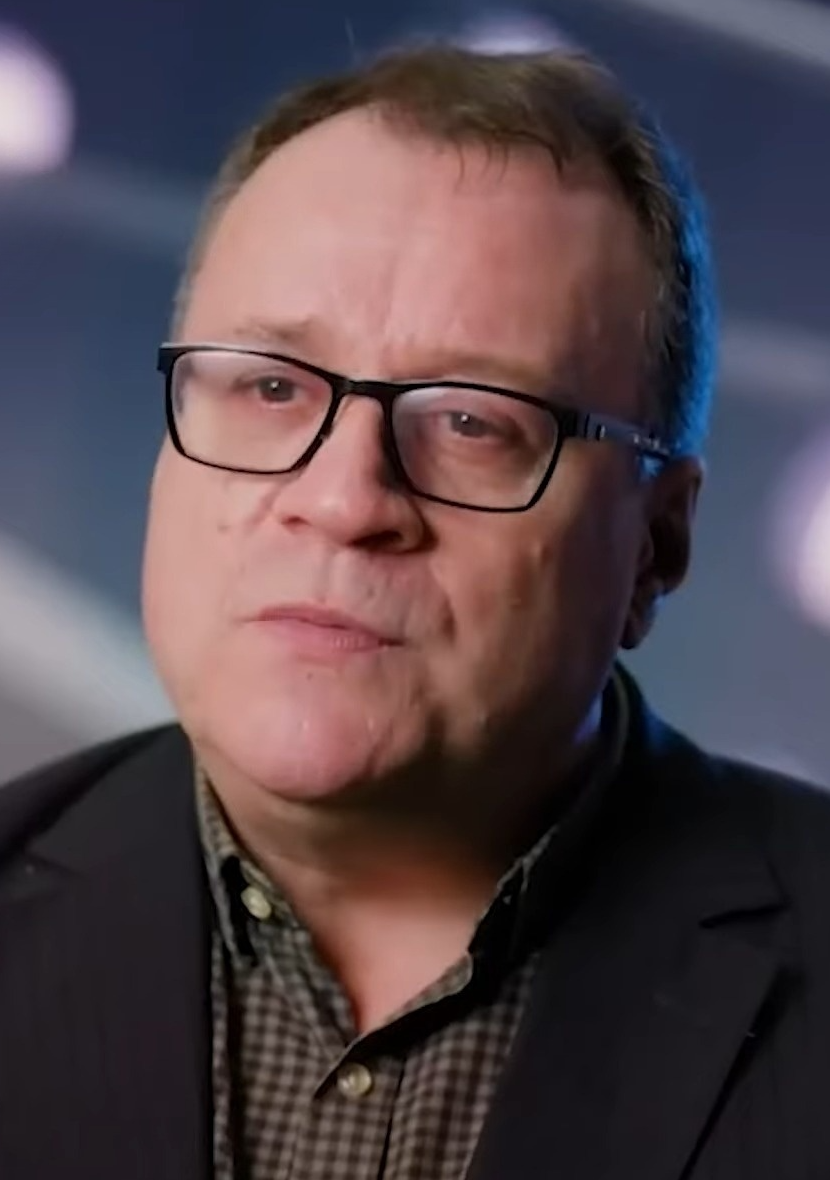
Steven Moffat (left), Juno Dawson (center), and Russell T Davies (right) wrote a combined seven of the nine episodes filmed during the series' production run.

Davies was writing the 2024 Christmas special by December 2022, and the fifteenth series by June 2023. By 18 September 2023, five of the nine scripts had been completed according to Davies's column in Doctor Who Magazine. By 2 January 2024, Davies's column stated that the fifth episode was now on Draft 5, while Episode 6 was about to enter Draft 9, "getting this script ready has been epic...but all worth it, what a story!"

In May 2024, former showrunner and head writer Steven Moffat confirmed that he had written the 2024 Christmas special, and that it was entitled "Joy to the World". Davies had initially planned to write the special, but after realizing he would be busy, he elected to enlist Moffat to write the story. The episodes of the series itself were written by Davies and four other writers, revealed on 27 January 2025 to be Juno Dawson, Inua Ellams, Pete McTighe, and Sharma Angel-Walfall. McTighe had previously written two episodes for the series: "Kerblam!" (2018) and "Praxeus" (2020), and additionally helped write the then-forthcoming spin-off series "The War Between the Land and the Sea". Dawson had also previously written for the series, having written the first official scripted podcast for the franchise: Doctor Who: Redacted. Dawson is the first transgender woman to write for the television series.

The series introduces a new companion character named Belinda Chandra, who is portrayed by Varada Sethu. In an interview with Polygon, Davies explained that Belinda's introduction was intended to "expand the range" of the show, citing that unlike the younger and more optimistic Ruby Sunday (Millie Gibson) who had been the prior season's companion, Belinda had a different approach in that she saw the Doctor as someone "mad" and "dangerous". Belinda is introduced in the series opener, "The Robot Revolution" (2025), where she is kidnapped from Earth and becomes unable to return home. The series focuses on the Doctor attempting to bring Belinda back to Earth as they face "wider terrors than ever before". Davies remarked this to be a unique plot thread for the series, as Belinda, unlike past companions, does not want to be a part of the Doctor's adventures; additionally, it also made it so stories set on present-day Earth were not possible due to the Doctor and Belinda being unable to return there. Sethu had previously portrayed a character in the prior series episode "Boom" (2024), with the connection being explained in-universe as being a result of Sethu's two characters being related to one another. The series continues story threads from the prior series, including continuing the story of Ruby after her departure from travelling with the Doctor, as well as the recurring presence of the Pantheon of Discord, a group of god-like entities who come into conflict with the Doctor.

Another major recurring plot thread involves re-appearing appearances by a mysterious old woman named Mrs. Flood, who had previously appeared as a recurring character in the prior series. This culminated in the reveal that Mrs. Flood is actually the character known as the Rani; the Rani had previously served as a recurring antagonist in the show's original 1963-1989 run. The character's end goal is to bring about the return of another antagonist from the show's original run: Omega. Mrs. Flood's original identity was not originally planned by Davies when filming the prior series, and was unsure of what her identity would be for a while during production. Though he initially considered bringing in an original antagonist to fulfill her role in the plot, he felt the usage of a returning character would encourage viewers to view her previous appearances on BBC iPlayer, where prior Doctor Who episodes can be watched. Omega, similarly, was originally considered to be a new Time Lord antagonist, but this ended up being substituted as a result of Davies feeling Omega fulfilled the necessary plot role better than an original character.

=== Filming ===
With filming for the previous series concluding in July 2023, crew were given a four-week turnaround before pre-production started for the next series, on 14 August. Each production block was given ten weeks of preparation. The first readthrough was held on 17 October 2023.

Rogue's cameo in "Wish World" was recorded in 2023 during the production of the series 14 episode, "Rogue". Principal photography began on 23 October 2023 at Bad Wolf Studios, with the 2024 Christmas special "Joy to the World" assigned to the first block, directed by Alex Sanjiv Pillai. The second block – containing the first and fourth episodes – had its first readthrough on 7 November 2023, and began filming on 14 November 2023, directed by Peter Hoar. Hoar had previously directed the sixth series episode "A Good Man Goes to War" (2011), and had worked with Davies on It's a Sin and Nolly. Filming for the third block – containing the second and third episodes – began on Monday 8 January 2024 after the Christmas break, directed by Amanda Brotchie. Location filming at Penarth Pier marked the first time that Sethu was photographed on-set as the new companion.

Makalla McPherson and Ben A. Williams directed further blocks, with McPherson directing the fifth episode, where she described she had "created a unique crane shot as the Doctor runs through a maze as they escape their captors" and Williams directing the sixth episode, which he described as a "very big episode", and Davies described as "epic". The episode from Williams is themed after the Eurovision Song Contest. Production for the series wrapped on 24 May 2024.

Production blocks were arranged as follows:

Block	Episode(s)	Director	Writer(s)	Producer
1	Christmas special: "Joy to the World"	Alex Sanjiv Pillai	Steven Moffat	Alison Sterling
2	Episode 4: "Lucky Day"	Peter Hoar	Pete McTighe	Vicki Delow
2	Episode 1: "The Robot Revolution"	Peter Hoar	Russell T Davies	Vicki Delow
3	Episode 2: "Lux"	Amanda Brotchie	Russell T Davies	Chris May
3	Episode 3: "The Well"	Amanda Brotchie	Russell T Davies & Sharma Angel-Walfall	Chris May
4	Episode 5: "The Story & the Engine"	Makalla McPherson	Inua Ellams	Vicki Delow
4	Episode 6: "The Interstellar Song Contest"	Ben A. Williams	Juno Dawson	Vicki Delow
Unknown	Episode 7: "Wish World"	Alex Sanjiv Pillai	Russell T Davies	Chris May
Unknown	Episode 8: "The Reality War"	Alex Sanjiv Pillai	Russell T Davies	Chris May

== Release ==
=== Broadcast ===
On 21 February 2025, a trailer stating that the series would launch on 12 April was shown during the BBC's coverage of a Six Nations Under 20s Championship rugby match between England and Scotland. The series is released in the UK on BBC iPlayer and internationally on Disney+.

The episodes are released weekly on Saturdays at 8 a.m. BST. Episodes also air on the evening of their release on BBC One. The sixth episode of the series, "The Interstellar Song Contest", was scheduled to be broadcast on BBC One on 17 May, ahead of the final of the Eurovision Song Contest 2025. However, if the FA Cup final, which was also scheduled to be played that afternoon, went to extra time, the episode would not be shown on BBC One; the episode would eventually be played at its scheduled time. The two-part finale, "Wish World" / "The Reality War", were screened together in UK cinemas on 31 May. Release of "The Reality War" across streaming and cinemas and internationally aligned with its simultaneous evening BBC One broadcast. The episode was released at 6:50 p.m. BST in the United Kingdom, and at 11 a.m. PT in the United States.

Due to the terms of a deal between BBC Worldwide and SMG Pictures in China in May 2017, the company has first right of refusal on the purchase for the Chinese market of future series of the programme until and including series 15.

=== Aftershow ===
The series is accompanied by Doctor Who: Unleashed, a behind-the-scenes companion show. Adopting a similar format to the former behind-the-scenes programme Doctor Who Confidential, Unleashed follows every new episode of Doctor Who with a 30-minute instalment on BBC Three, hosted by Steffan Powell.

=== Home media ===
The fifteenth series along with the preceding Christmas special received home media releases in August 2025. "Joy to the World" also had an independent release earlier that year.

Series	Story no.	Episode name	Duration	Release date		
Series	Story no.	Episode name	Duration	R2	R4	R1
15	312	Doctor Who: "Joy to the World"	1 × 55 min.	27 January 2025^{(D,B)}	—N/a	—N/a
15	312–319	Doctor Who: Season Two (includes "Joy to the World")	1 × 55 min. 7 × 45 min. 1 × 65 min.	18 August 2025^{(D,B)}	15 July 2026^{(D,B)}	2 June 2026^{(D,B)}

=== In print ===
The first three stories from the series were novelised for release in 2025 as part of the Target Collection. The first book included a deleted scene from the televised episode.

Series	Story no.	Novelisation title	Author	Paperback release date (Note: Published by BBC Books under the Target Collection umbrella unless otherwise indicated)	Audiobook	
Series	Story no.	Novelisation title	Author	Paperback release date	Release date (Note: Unabridged from BBC Audio / AudioGo unless otherwise indicated)	Narrator
15	313	The Robot Revolution	Una McCormack	10 July 2025		Varada Sethu
15	314	Lux	James Goss	10 July 2025		Dan Starkey
15	315	The Well	Gareth L. Powell	10 July 2025		Caoilfhionn Dunne

=== Soundtrack ===
In June 2025, composer Murray Gold commented on the release of the related soundtrack, and that there would likely be "one big music dump" for the soundtracks of the tenth series, 2023 specials, fourteenth series and fifteenth series.

In February 2026, Gold appeared on spin-off programme The Whoniverse Show to discuss the soundtracks for the 2023 specials and following two series, stating that the release window would "be 2026 I think. Hopefully all three."

== Reception ==
=== Critical response ===
Doctor Who series 15: Critical reception by episode
Series 15 (2025): Percentage of positive critics' reviews tracked by the website Rotten Tomatoes

On the review aggregator website Rotten Tomatoes, 92% of 120 critics' reviews are positive, with an average rating of 5.86/10. The website's consensus reads: "Ncuti Gatwa's sly Time Lord has an excellent new foil in Varada Sethu, helping steer this latest slate of Doctor Who adventures on a starry path." Metacritic, which uses a weighted average, assigned the series a score of 66 out of 100, based on 13 critics, indicating "generally favorable" reviews.

Ed Power, writing in a review of the series opener, "The Robot Revolution", for The Independent, positively highlighted the light-heartedness of the opening, believing it to be a strong start for the series and an improvement on episodes led by the prior showrunner of the series, Chris Chibnall. Hoai-Tran Bui, writing in a review of the opener for Inverse, praised the strong dynamic between Belinda and the Doctor in the opener, believing it provided a strong start to the series. Scott Bryan, writing in a review of the opener for Variety, similarly highlighted the positive vibes of the episode, as well as the overall more progressive casting choices present within the series.

Reviews for series finale "The Reality War" were largely mixed; several critics reviewing the episode criticised it for several reasons, including the handling of Belinda's character, the return of the Rani and Omega, and the subplot involving Poppy. Kai Young, writing in a retrospective for series 14 and 15, felt that the recent series lacked a strong exploration of its antagonists, with many returning ones relying too much on past appearances. Writing for The Daily Telegraph, Michael Hogan similarly felt that the series was relying too much on older antagonists like the Rani and Omega, with Hogan feeling that the writing of the series had progressively gotten weaker over time.

=== Ratings ===
The fifteenth series continued to see a consistent drop in overnight viewing figures, with the second episode setting a record-low. Despite this, the show remained high in ranks, the series premiere was the second most-watched programme broadcast on BBC One on the day it transmitted and 75% of its total viewership was from online streaming. Consolidated ratings also experienced a decrease from previous series, averaging 3.1 million after the fourth episode had concluded, down from the 3.9 million who viewed the first four episodes of the previous series, and 5 million that watched episodes one through four of series thirteen. The lower numbers led to tabloid rumors that Gatwa was fired, which the BBC refuted.

Speculation on the future of Doctor Who and its involvement with Disney also arose, with Davies suggesting that another hiatus may be imminent. Deadline Hollywood noted that while "broadcasters and streamers prefer to use 28-day figures, [...] seven-day viewing is usually directional". In the United States, series fifteen failed to enter streaming charts from Luminate or Nielsen. The BBC ultimately announced in October 2025 that the programme would continue and return with a 2026 Christmas special, although without backing from Disney+; the Christmas special was later cancelled in June 2026. A further report from Deadline Hollywood indicated that Disney ultimately decided to back away from Doctor Who because of low ratings due to their failure to properly market the show, which was in-turn caused by Bob Iger's return to the company, Trumpism, and budgetary reasons. A piece from The AV Club would also hypothesise that the show's poor ratings made it hard for the company to justify the required budget for the show, as well as the show's focus on being on queer representation and inclusiveness, which Disney had concerns with due to the highly conservative nature of the United States at the time of the series' airing.

No.	Title	Air date	Overnight ratings		Consolidated ratings		Total viewers (millions)	28-day viewers (millions)	AI	Ref(s)
No.	Title	Air date	Viewers (millions)	Rank	Viewers (millions)	Rank	Total viewers (millions)	28-day viewers (millions)	AI	Ref(s)
–	"Joy to the World"	25 December 2024	4.11	6	2.22	6	6.33	6.90	76	
1	"The Robot Revolution"	12 April 2025	2.00	4	1.56	21	3.56	4.34	–	
2	"Lux"	19 April 2025	1.58	8	1.46	25	3.04	3.72	–	
3	"The Well"	26 April 2025	1.86	4	1.38	23	3.24	3.78	–	
4	"Lucky Day"	3 May 2025	1.50	5	1.33	29	2.83	3.29	–	
5	"The Story & the Engine"	10 May 2025	1.59	4	1.12	35	2.71	3.26	–	
6	"The Interstellar Song Contest"	17 May 2025	2.57	3	1.23	9	3.79	4.27	–	
7	"Wish World"	24 May 2025	1.80	5	1.36	30	3.16	3.80	–	
8	"The Reality War"	31 May 2025	2.17	2	1.31	18	3.48	3.81	–	

== Future ==
=== Cancelled Disney+ future ===
A third series with Davies as showrunner was being planned by November 2023. Gatwa commented on returning in April 2024. By that June, Davies was working on the fourth script for the series, despite it not yet being commissioned, with filming expected to begin in early 2025, and an expected release at the time within 2026. During an interview on The Graham Norton Show, Gatwa stated that he would be filming the third Disney-produced season of Doctor Who in 2025. The BBC later contradicted the statement, stating that "the decision on season three will be made after season two transmits". Gatwa left the show in a surprise regeneration in "The Reality War", regenerating in a form that resembles former companion Rose Tyler. Following the airing of the series, the BBC announced in October 2025 that the programme would return with a 2026 Christmas special, albeit without backing from Disney+, with plans for the next series to be announced "in due course"; the following June, it was announced that the planned special had been cancelled and Davies had departed from his role as showrunner.

In Davies's memoir published in October 2026, The Queerest of Folk: A Life in Television, Davies detailed the episodes that were written for a potential third Disney+ series, three of which were written and the rest were planned. The first, written by Laurence Clark and Jack Thorne, was set during the Great Fire of London; the second, written by Lydia Adetunji, was set around a NASA-type space station and trypophobia; the third, written by Sharma Angel-Walfall, was set on a council estate in the middle of Manchester. Discussions were held about the return of the character Rogue with writers Kate Herron and Briony Redman, and on Juno Dawson returning to write an episode. The series was set to conclude with a four-episode Dalek story. When Gatwa left the series and Disney ended its partnership with the BBC in 2025, the BBC scrapped the planned season, with Davies' saying that "it breaks [his] heart they won't be seen".

=== Competitive tendered future ===
In June 2026, it was announced that the BBC was planning a competitive tender process for a future series. The BBC subsequently published the Invitation to Tender for the programme in September 2026. If successful, a contract will be awarded to the winning producer in March 2027 for one series of episodes and specials, anticipated to transmit in 2028 or 2029, with the option for the BBC to commission a second series. In November 2026, multiple production companies were shortlisted as a result of the tender process, including Jed Mercurio and Jimmy Mulville via Hat Trick Productions, World Productions who are owned by ITV Studios, STV Studios pairing with Screen Scotland, as well as BBC Studios who own the rights to Doctor Who but lost the production contract to Bad Wolf. The BBC were also considering companies to pitch a series using episodic writers rather than the programme's traditional showrunner model it had used since 2005.
