= Joy to the World (Doctor Who) =

312 – "Joy to the World"
- Doctor Who episode
- Promotional poster, featuring the caption "Joy to the Worlds"

Cast
- Doctor: Ncuti Gatwa – Fifteenth Doctor
- Companion: Nicola Coughlan – Joy Almondo
- Others: Millie Gibson – Ruby Sunday; Peter Benedict – Basil Flockhart; Julia Watson – Hilda Flockhart; Niamh Marie Smith – Sylvia Trench; Phil Baxter – Edmund Hillary; Samuel Sherpa-Moore – Tenzing Norgay; Steph de Whalley – Anita Benn; Jonathan Aris – Hotel Manager; Ruchi Rai – Receptionist; Joshua Leese – Mr Single; Joel Fry – Trev Simpkins; Ell Potter – Server; Liam Prince-Donnelly – Barman; Fiona Marr – Angela Grace; Fiona Scott – Joy's Mum

Production
- Directed by: Alex Sanjiv Pillai
- Written by: Steven Moffat
- Produced by: Alison Sterling
- Executive producers: Russell T Davies; Julie Gardner; Jane Tranter; Steven Moffat; Joel Collins; Phil Collinson
- Music by: Murray Gold
- Running time: 54 minutes
- First broadcast: 25 December 2024

Chronology
← Preceded by "Empire of Death"	Followed by → "The Robot Revolution"

"Joy to the World" is an episode of the British science fiction television series Doctor Who. It was broadcast on BBC One and released on Disney+ on 25 December 2024 as the fifteenth Christmas special since the show's revival in 2005.

In the episode, the Fifteenth Doctor discovers a mysterious briefcase in a strange hotel that harnesses the power of time travel as a gimmick. While investigating, he meets one-off companion Joy Almondo (Nicola Coughlan) who helps him solve the mystery.

"Joy to the World" was written by Steven Moffat and directed by Alex Sanjiv Pillai. It was filmed in October and November 2023. The episode was seen by 6.33 million viewers and received mostly positive reviews from critics.

== Plot ==
The Doctor arrives at the Time Hotel in London, an establishment in the year 4202 that uses time travel to offer hotel rooms at various points in history. The Doctor enlists Trev, a hotel employee, to investigate a man handcuffed to a mysterious briefcase. As each new person is tricked into taking the briefcase, including Trev, it takes control of their body and the previous carrier disintegrates. The briefcase is eventually passed to Trev's manager, a Silurian, who the Doctor follows to Joy Almondo's room at the London-based Sandringham Hotel in 2024.

After Joy takes the briefcase, the Doctor opens it to find a strange device inside. Before the briefcase can disintegrate Joy, a Doctor from the future arrives from the Time Hotel and gives the override code. The future-Doctor takes Joy back to the Time Hotel, trapping the contemporary Doctor in 2024. He takes a job at the Sandringham Hotel and befriends the manager, Anita Benn, while he waits for the door to the Time Hotel in Exeter Hotel in New York City to reopen following Christmas.

On Christmas Eve 2025, the Doctor re-enters the Time Hotel and returns to the room in 2024; he gives his past self the override code and takes Joy to the future, completing the causal loop. They open a door to 65 million years ago where the Doctor frees Joy from the briefcase by provoking her anger at Partygate, when she was unable to be with her mother, who died on Christmas Day 2020, due to COVID-19 lockdowns. He learns the briefcase is made by Villengard, a weapons manufacturing company, and the briefcase is an incubator for a "star seed"; the company plans to use the hotel's time-travel system to allow the seed to grow in the past, then detonate it to provide an energy source.

A Tyrannosaurus rex eats the briefcase and chases the Doctor and Joy back to the Time Hotel. Trev's consciousness, still psychically linked to Villengard's system, leads the Doctor to a shrine with the briefcase sealed inside. The Doctor opens it to disarm it, but Joy takes the star seed outside and allows it to enter her, merging herself with the other people killed by the seed. Despite the Doctor's protests that the seed will kill her, Joy assures him that the seed has overcome Villengard's programming, and that she will evolve and shine forever in the sky. Joy also notes that both she and the Doctor share a common loneliness, and advises him to find a friend. After bidding the Doctor farewell, Joy flies off to pilot the star seed safely into space to detonate, becoming the Star of Bethlehem. At various points in time, the star gives hope and comfort to those who see it, including Ruby Sunday, Anita (who is offered a job at the Time Hotel), and Joy's dying mother.

== Production ==
=== Writing ===
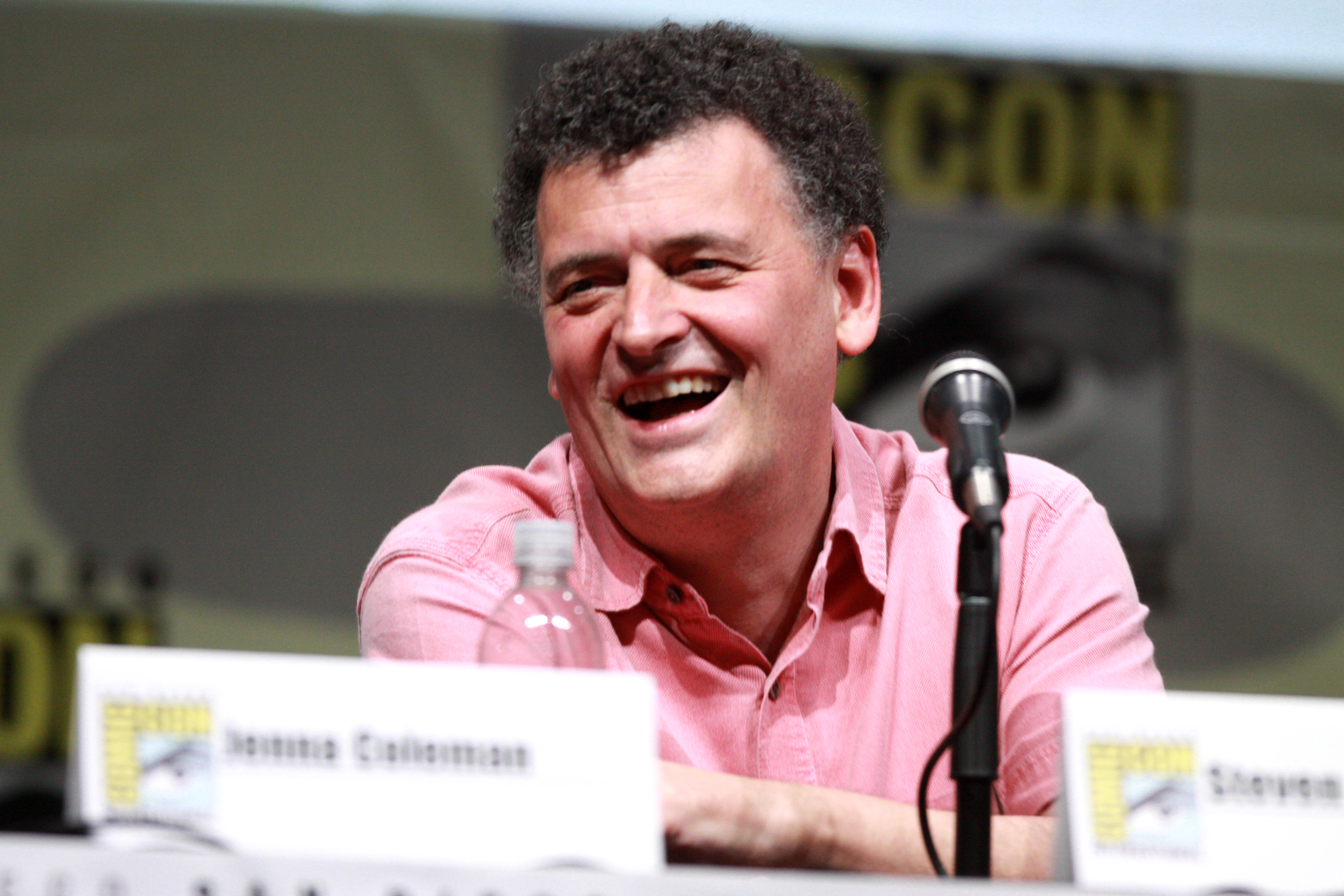
Former Doctor Who showrunner Steven Moffat penned the episode.

Russell T Davies, the Doctor Who showrunner, initially began writing the 2024 Christmas special. Davies had sent a portion of the script to former showrunner Steven Moffat to get his opinion on it. At the time, Davies was in discussions with Moffat to have him write a script for the fifteenth series. When Davies realised he was too busy to complete the script, he shelved it and asked Moffat to write the Christmas episode instead. Moffat considered writing a farce, but decided against it, believing that such an episode would be better suited mid-series. Despite this, he said the episode still had a comedic tone with emotional elements.

Here's the pitch that got me the job. You know in just about every hotel room you've been in there's a locked door? It's weird, but there always is. Okay. We're about to blow apart the truth of that. In the far future there is a place called the Time Hotel, and the Time Hotel has realised something brilliant, which is following the discovery of time travel they have an opportunity to sell all the rooms they failed to sell the last time. So they have built extensions into more or less every hotel room in history, and you get access to it occasionally.

— Steven Moffat, "The Joy Bringer", SFX 3 December 2024

Half the script had been completed before Davies informed Moffat that Ruby Sunday would not appear in the special. The character of Anita originally only had around ten lines, but her presence was increased after the production team became fond of her. Moffat said that she hardly featured in the first draft but as they could not afford to film in multiple locations her part was increased to take their place. Moffat had finished writing the episode by 20 July 2023. Working titles for the episode included "The Time Hotel" and "Christmas, Everywhere All at Once". The story further explores the "Villengard Corporation", a recurring fictional antagonistic company that has been mentioned in a number of Moffat's Doctor Who episodes. The Doctor last confronted Villengard in the fourteenth series episode "Boom" (2024). It is the ninth Doctor Who Christmas special to be written by Moffat who once again assumed an executive producer role during production of the episode.

=== Casting ===
In November 2023, Nicola Coughlan was announced to be appearing in an undisclosed role of an upcoming Doctor Who episode. It was later revealed that Coughlan would star in the 2024 Christmas episode as the Doctor's one-off companion, Joy Almondo, a guest at a hotel who "gets caught up in [the Doctor's] adventures". Initial reports indicated that Millie Gibson, who portrays the Doctor's companion Ruby Sunday, would not appear in the special. However, Gibson made a brief cameo at the end of the episode. Joel Fry was cast to play Trev, an employee at the Time Hotel while Jonathan Aris portrayed the hotel's manager. Steph de Whalley appeared as Anita, the manager of another hotel whom the Doctor spends a year with.

Niamh Marie Smith played Sylvia Trench, a passenger on the Orient Express in 1962, whom Moffat confirmed as the same character as the love interest of James Bond in the films Dr. No (1962) and From Russia with Love (1963). Historical figures Edmund Hillary and Tenzing Norgay were depicted at a 1953 Mount Everest base camp by Phil Baxter and Samuel Sherpa-Moore, respectively. Sherpa-Moore is Norgay's great-great nephew. Peter Benedict and Julia Watson appeared as Basil and Hilda, guests at the Queen's Hotel in Manchester during World War II. The guest cast also included Ruchi Rai, Joshua Leese, Ell Potter, and Liam Prince-Donnelly.

=== Filming ===
Set design for the episode was underway at Wolf Studios Wales by 11 October 2023. The Mesozoic Era room was built on a gimbal that allowed the set to tilt to give the effect that it was being eaten by a dinosaur. The art department was working on graphic design by 17 October. The graphics team took fifteen 11-hour days to create enough artwork to fill the Doctor's hotel room. Seven different briefcases were purchased by the props department for use in the episode. A team at Millennium FX designed the Silurian prosthetics.

The readthrough for the episode took place on 17 October 2023. Principal photography began on 23 October, with recording extending into November. Joy to the World was directed by Alex Sanjiv Pillai in the first filming block of the fifteenth series. This was Pillai's Doctor Who debut, before being invited to direct the subsequent series finale.

For the Sandringham Hotel, the production team chose to purchase two floors of an actual hotel, but had to build rooms including Joy/The Doctor's hotel room on a soundstage. The Time Hotel's lobby was constructed and filmed on Stage 1 at Wolf Studios Wales, with the warren of corridors on Stage 6. The top of the Orient Express set was built in front of a green screen and placed on rubber tyres to allow the special effects team to replicate the look of a moving train. Mika Orasmaa was the episode's director of photography.

The final mix for, and completion of the episode, was on 29 August 2024.

== Release and reception ==
Professional ratings
Aggregate scores
Source	Rating
Rotten Tomatoes (Tomatometer)	80%
Rotten Tomatoes (Average Score)	7.3/10
Review scores
Source	Rating
The A.V. Club	B−
Bleeding Cool	10/10
Empire	4/5 stars
GamesRadar+	4/5 stars
The Guardian	5/5 stars
IGN	9/10
Radio Times	4/5 stars
The Telegraph	4/5 stars

=== Broadcast and promotion ===
"Joy to the World" was broadcast on BBC One and released on BBC iPlayer on 25 December 2024 at 5:10 PM GMT. In the United States the episode was released simultaneously on Disney+ at 9:10 AM PT. Disney also handled international distribution of the episode outside of the United Kingdom.

A clip and trailer for the episode was released on 15 November as part of the 2024 Children in Need broadcast. The press screening took place in the week prior to broadcast, which was hosted by Angellica Bell. Promotional posters released by Disney captioned the poster "Joy to the Worlds", instead of "Joy to the World", causing confusion among viewers.

=== Ratings ===
In the UK, Doctor Who was the sixth most-watched programme on Christmas Day, receiving 4.11 million viewers overnight. The episode received a total of 6.33 million consolidated viewers across 7 days, and a total of 6.90 million consolidated viewers across 28 days.

=== Critical response ===
On the review aggregator website Rotten Tomatoes, 80% of 15 critics' reviews are positive, with an average rating of 7.3/10.

Writing for The Daily Telegraph, Michael Hogan referred to "Joy to the World" as "the best Christmas adventure for more than a decade". He further elaborated by saying that "there's something here for all generations to enjoy" and praising the guest cast, namely Nicola Coughlan, Steph de Walley, and Joel Fry. Radio Times's Louise Griffin also praised the guest cast but felt that Coughlan had been underused.

IGN's Robert Anderson wrote that the special "masterfully blends the show's signature whimsy with heartfelt storytelling, delivering a cozy, deeply human tale about the transformative power of friendship" and that "Moffat's excellent script is central to the episode's success". The writing was also applauded by Bleeding Cool's Adi Tantimedh, who wrote "Moffat pins down the core of what makes Ncuti Gatwa's Doctor different from all his predecessors".

Stephen Robinson of The A.V. Club criticised the Doctor's characterisation, noting "there are key moments in the story that directly contradict the Doctor's former growth" and that "he's a mix of the 'lonely god' from Russell T Davies' first run and Steven Moffat's 'madman in a box,' and the effect is discordant". Emily Murray from GamesRadar+ criticised a portion of the episode, writing that the "villains quite frankly feel like an afterthought and feel threadbare".

== Home media ==
"Joy to the World" received an individual DVD and Blu-ray release on 27 January 2025.
