= Lux (Doctor Who) =

314 – "Lux"
- Doctor Who episode
- Promotional title-card

Cast
- Doctor: Ncuti Gatwa – Fifteenth Doctor
- Companion: Varada Sethu – Belinda Chandra
- Others: Ian Shaw – Newsreader; Cassius Hackforth – Tommy Lee; Ryan Speakman – Husband; Linus Roache – Reginald Pye; Alan Cumming – Mr Ring-a-Ding; Millie O'Connell – Sunshine Sally; Lewis Cornay – Logan Cheever; Lucy Thackeray – Renée Lowenstein; Jane Hancock – Helen Pye; William Meredith – Policeman; Samir Arrian – Hassan Chowdry; Bronté Barbé – Lizzie Abel; Steph Lacey – Robyn Gossage; Anita Dobson – Mrs Flood

Production
- Directed by: Amanda Brotchie
- Written by: Russell T Davies
- Produced by: Chris May
- Executive producers: Russell T Davies; Julie Gardner; Jane Tranter; Joel Collins; Phil Collinson
- Music by: Murray Gold
- Series: Series 15
- Running time: 43 minutes
- First broadcast: 19 April 2025

Chronology
← Preceded by "The Robot Revolution"	Followed by → "The Well"

"Lux" is the second episode of the fifteenth series of the British science-fiction television series Doctor Who. It was written by Russell T Davies, the Doctor Who showrunner, from a concept first developed over two decades prior, and directed by Amanda Brotchie. In the episode, the Fifteenth Doctor (Ncuti Gatwa) and his companion, Belinda Chandra (Varada Sethu), land in 1952 Miami, Florida, while trying to make their way back to 2025. After doing so, they discover a mysterious cinema where fifteen people have disappeared. The pair stay to investigate and ultimately confront an animated god, Lux (voiced by Alan Cumming), who traps them in film.

"Lux" is unusual for the programme in that it features a mixed live-action and animated format. Filming for the episode took place in Penarth, Cardiff and at Wolf Studios Wales in January 2024. Some voice-over work took place internationally in New York City in June. Animation and other post-production work continued later into the year, with some tasks still being completed as late as September.

The episode includes references to popular culture, fourth wall breaks and meta-references to its own fan base. It was released on BBC iPlayer, BBC One, and Disney+ on 19 April 2025. Reception to the episode was positive, with critics praising its use of animation in a live-action setting. Although "Lux" was noted for record low broadcast ratings, it received consolidated figures of 3.04 million. A novelisation written by James Goss was released on 10 July 2025.

== Plot ==
Unable to return to 24 May 2025, the TARDIS lands in 1952 Miami, where the Doctor and Belinda find a cinema that is chained shut. At a diner, they speak to the mother of one of fifteen people who disappeared whilst at the cinema, which continues to play movies at night. Although racial segregation is still enforced in 1952, the waiter allows them to stay at the diner.

Inside the cinema, the pair discover that a living rubber hose cartoon character, Mr. Ring-a-Ding, the embodiment of Lux Imperator, God of Light and member of the Pantheon of Discord, is responsible for the missing people. The projectionist of the cinema, Reginald Pye, plays films for Lux, who uses his power to recreate Pye's dead wife. Lux has trapped the missing people in a film reel. He similarly traps the Doctor and Belinda and turns them into cartoon characters until they regain their usual forms by feeling sad to "become more three-dimensional". They flee to another false reality, where a racist police officer, erroneously in NYPD uniform, accuses them of breaking segregation laws by being in the cinema. They escape through a television watched by Doctor Who fans. The fans are delighted to meet the Doctor and believe that blowing up the film reels can defeat Lux. The fans reveal that they are not real and will cease to exist once the Doctor and Belinda escape but encourage him to return to the real world and defeat Lux.

The Doctor and Belinda escape by burning the film reel; the Doctor injures his hand while escaping but heals it using residual regeneration energy. Lux steals his energy in order to create a solid body for himself and leave the theater. Belinda attempts to burn film reels to cause an explosion, but, encouraged by his wife, Pye sacrifices himself. The explosion exposes the cinema to sunlight, which causes Lux to expand infinitely until he evaporates into the universe, resulting in the release of the missing people from the theatre. As the Doctor and Belinda leave, Mrs. Flood appears and encourages the bystanders to watch the TARDIS dematerialise, claiming that this "show" is a "limited run" that ends on 24 May.

In a mid-credits sequence, the three Doctor Who fans from inside Lux's trap critique the episode, realising that they still exist.

== Production ==
=== Development ===
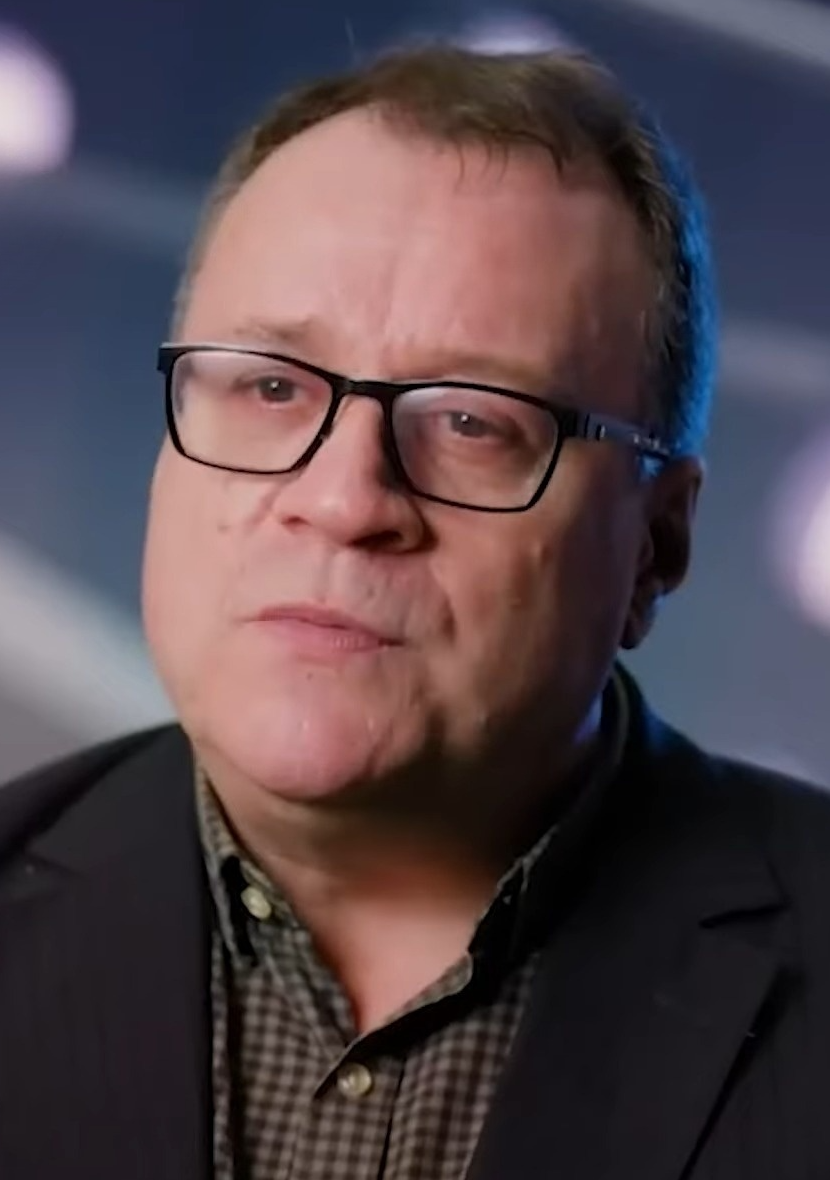
The episode was written by Russell T Davies, the Doctor Who showrunner.

"Lux" was written by Doctor Who showrunner Russell T Davies. He had wanted to do an episode that included a living cartoon for a long time, but was unable to do one until then for funding reasons. He also revealed that he had considered variants of such an episode, including one two decades prior that would have featured a hologram rather than a legitimate animation as a result of the budgetary constraints. The story also contains mentions of segregation and racism, which Davies said he added to address issues in present-day society. It was also used as a subversion to the Doctor usually situating themselves as the main authority figure. Whilst including such themes, Davies did not want them to be the dominant subject of the episode. Examples of racism and segregation in the episode include the NYPD officer saying the cinema is a space "reserved for white folk" and prejudicially assuming that Belinda is Caribbean. Other motifs in the episode present explore grief, hope, friendship and sadness. Popular culture references to Rock Hudson and the Scooby-Doo character Velma were included. Additionally, Davies continued a recent trend of his by having a character directly address the camera, breaking the fourth wall. Also unusual for the show, the episode featured a mid-credits scene.

Meta-references to Doctor Who fans are also present in the episode as Davies recalled his enjoyment of cartoons while writing it, which made him consider people who loved the programme. The fans declared "Blink" (2007) as their favourite episode and one of them also alludes to a potential cancellation of the show. They point out the "obviousness" of the episode's foreshadowing and make references to online leaks. The show's BBC ident appears on the screen of their television. Although they say they are too inconsequential to be given surnames, all three characters — Hassan Chowdry, Lizzie Abel and Robyn Gossage — are fully named in the credits.

The concept of Doctor Who existing within its own universe had previously been briefly explored in the serial Remembrance of the Daleks (1988) and other expanded media. Following the instance in "Lux", such an idea was considered to be quasi-canon by a reviewer. This scene also raised suspicion that Davies had potentially been planting spoilers online himself regarding upcoming episodes as well as rumours that the series would enter into another hiatus. It was also theorized that these leaks could be part of a larger marketing campaign. When the fact that the episode was written and filmed well before the leaks began appearing was considered, another reviewer stated that the episode had the same "kind of mind-bending prediction you'd expect from The Simpsons".

=== Casting ===
The episode stars Ncuti Gatwa as the fifteenth incarnation of The Doctor and Varada Sethu as his companion, Belinda Chandra. Alan Cumming voices the antagonist, Mr. Ring-a-Ding. It marks Cumming's second appearance in the show after his role as King James VI and I in the 2018 episode "The Witchfinders". Davies said that he and the production team had considered whether it was too soon to cast Cumming again and that he likely would not have been had it been a live action role. Mr. Ring-a-Ding is the "God of Light" and part of the "Pantheon of Gods" that Davies has been developing since "The Giggle" (2023). Linus Roache stars as Reginald Pye, the theatre's projectionist, and Lewis Cornay plays a diner worker who helps the Doctor and Belinda investigate the disappearances. Anita Dobson also makes a brief appearance as recurring character Mrs. Flood. The trio of fans were portrayed by Samir Arrian, Bronte Barbe and Steph Lacey.

=== Production design and costumes ===
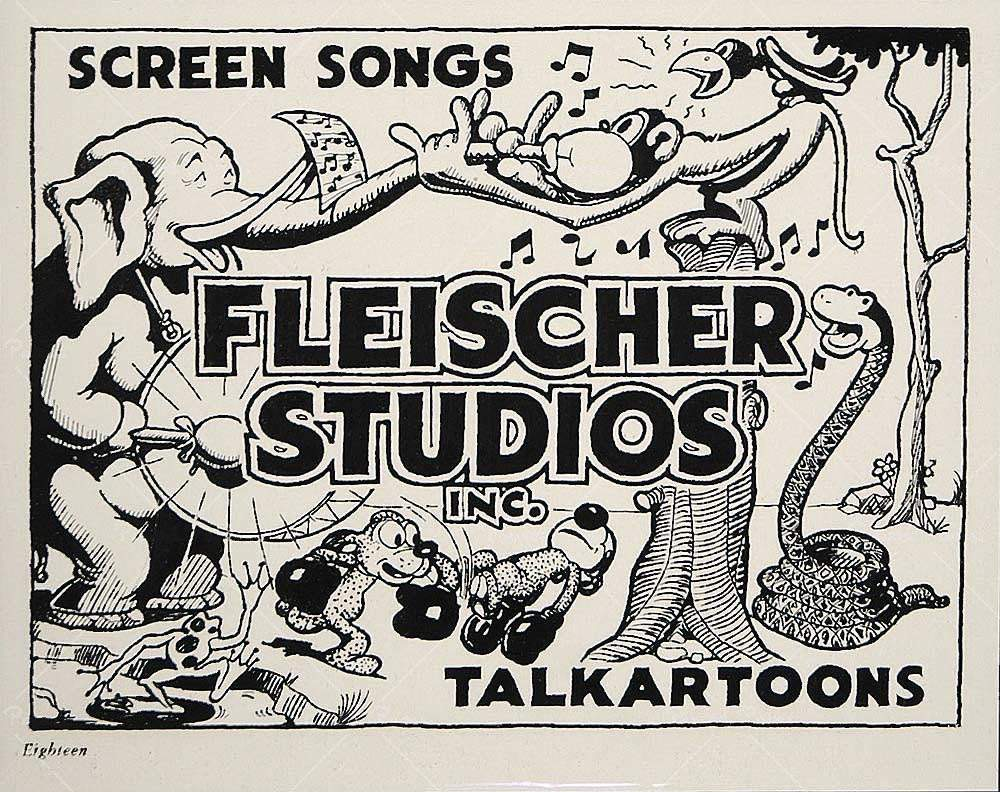
The concept of Mr. Ring-a-Ding was inspired by animations from Fleischer Studios.

Ian Spendloff worked as a creative designer for the episode, and was the designer for the character of Mr. Ring-a-Ding. Davies compared the concept of Mr. Ring-a-Ding to Fleischer animations from the 1930s. Spendloff drafted thirty different sketches that were considered before finally settling on the one used in the episode. Each sketch featured variations in noses, hair and other elements. Mr. Ring-a-Ding was ultimately given a pig-like nose and blue skin to reflect characteristics of cartoon characters from the 1950s, with Davies wanting the character to look vaguely human but not be immediately identifiable as something else.

Costume designer Pam Downe created the Doctor's and Belinda's outfits using the complementary colours of blue and yellow. Sethu's dress was inspired by a similar one worn by Anita (Ariana DeBose) and designed by Paul Tazewell in the 2021 adaptation of West Side Story. Meanwhile, Gatwa's blue suit was influenced by American musical artists of the 1950s. These hues were intended to further contrast with the red interior of the cinema by ultimately using all three primary colours. At least three different wigs were considered for Sethu to wear. Downe ultimately wanted to successfully convey movement during the episodes action scenes so the wig that best accomplished this goal was chosen. Sethu's dress also had multiple underskirts. The fans wore Doctor Who merchandise such as a Fourth Doctor scarf and a Cyberman "Telos" sweatshirt.

=== Filming and post-production ===
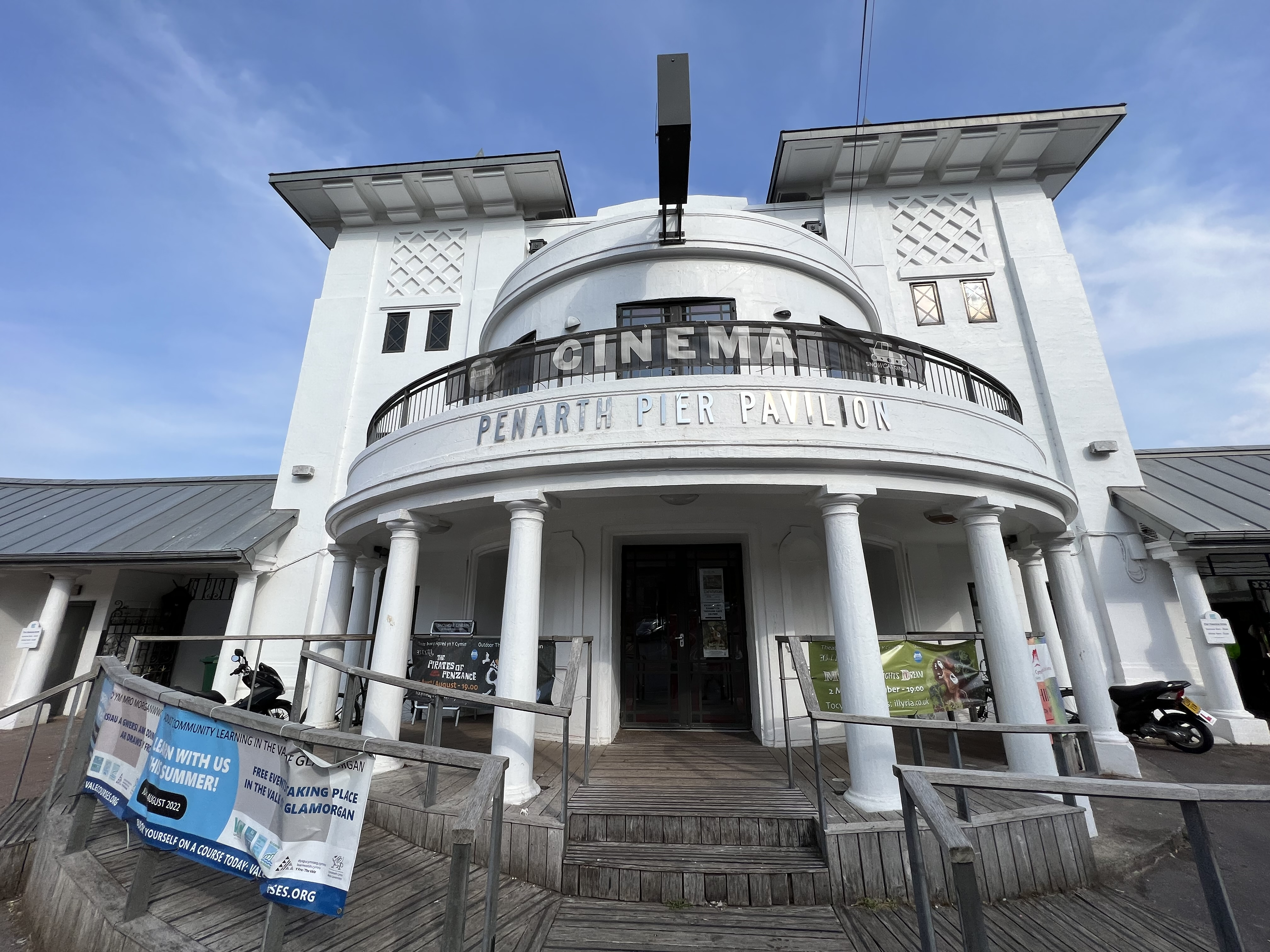
Exterior shots for the theater were filmed at Penarth Pier Pavilion. The wooden ramp can be seen at the bottom of the photo.

The story was filmed in the series' third production block, along with the following episode, "The Well". It was directed by Amanda Brotchie and recorded in late January 2024. Location shooting took place in Penarth, Cardiff and Leominster, Herefordshire. Penarth Pier pavilion was used for exterior shots of the movie theatre in Miami. The production team painted the building, added a period theatre sign, and removed a modern ramp at the front of the building. Its removal led to the discovery of rotting wood that had to be replaced at the show's expense. The surrounding area was made up to look like an American city in the 1950s by adding vehicles and American flags from that decade. The episode was shot during Storm Jocelyn, causing the cast and crew to struggle with unexpected rain and winds and requiring hot water bottles to keep warm during takes. The diner scenes were filmed at the OK Diner in Leominster, Herefordshire. Interior shots for the movie theatre were filmed on soundstage 4 at Wolf Studios Wales. Pieces of that set were reused from "The Devil's Chord" (2024).

As a result of Mr. Ring-a-Ding being an animated creation, the performers had to interact with a two-foot acrylic cutout of the character or a thin green pole on set. The scenes were then edited during the post-production process. References for Mr. Ring-a-Ding's movement were filmed by crew, and then drawn directly into the scene by animators from Framestore. Cumming voiced his scenes in New York City on 28 June 2024. Elements of Cumming's facial expressions during this recording for were incorporated into Mr. Ring-a-Ding. The scene where the Doctor and Belinda are turned into cartoons were first recorded on a green screen, in which Gatwa and Sethu had to portray the characters in a rigid and cartoon-like manner. The animators used this as a reference for interaction between the two characters when redrawing them as a cartoon. Animations were done at twenty-five frames a second, requiring twenty-five drawings for each second of screen time, or fewer if characters' movement was limited.

Foley artists recorded sound effects at Bang Post Production in Cardiff, Wales on 4 September 2024. The episode's soundtrack "Roll Over Beethoven" by Chuck Berry. Despite the episode taking place in 1952, the track was not released until 1956. Murray Gold, the show's composer, also included the song "The Sad Man with a Box", a piece that he originally composed for series 5.

== Broadcast and reception ==
Professional ratings
Aggregate scores
Source	Rating
Rotten Tomatoes (Tomatometer)	100%
Rotten Tomatoes (Average Score)	7.70/10
Review scores
Source	Rating
The A.V. Club	B
Bleeding Cool	10/10
The Daily Telegraph	4/5 stars
Evening Standard	3/5 stars
GamesRadar+	4.5/5 stars
IGN	9/10
Radio Times	4/5 stars
Vulture	4/5 stars

=== Broadcast ===
"Lux" was simultaneously released on BBC iPlayer at 8 a.m. British Summer Time (BST) in the United Kingdom and on Disney+ in the United States at 12 a.m. Pacific Daylight Time on 19 April 2025. A BBC One broadcast followed at 7:15 p.m. BST. Disney also handled international distribution of the episode.

=== Ratings ===
The episode received overnight viewing figures of 1.58 million, the lowest broadcast ratings in Doctor Who's history and the first time they had fallen below 2 million. It was the fourth most-watched programme of the day on BBC One, with Britain's Got Talent on ITV1 also achieving higher numbers. The episode received a total of 3.04 million consolidated viewers across 7 days, and a total of 3.72 million consolidated viewers across 28 days.

=== Critical reception ===
On the review aggregator website Rotten Tomatoes, 100% of 10 critics' reviews are positive, with an average rating of 7.70/10. Robert Anderson, writing for IGN, praised the episode, highlighting Mr. Ring-a-Ding, several individual scenes, such as the fourth-wall-breaking scene, and the performances of Gatwa and Sethu. The Guardian's Martin Belam responded positively to the episode, praising Cumming's performance and the fourth-wall-breaking scene. Will Salmon, writing for GamesRadar+, called attention to Mr. Ring-a-Ding and Gatwa's performance, though felt Murray Gold's musical score "drowned out" some scenes. Adi Tantimedh, writing for Bleeding Cool, found the episode to be the strongest out of the episodes headed by Davies in his second tenure as showrunner.

Andrew Blair, writing for Den of Geek, emphasised the characterisation of Mr. Ring-a-Ding, but criticized the episode's similarities to "The Devil's Chord", which he felt made the episode feel repetitive and weaker than it should have. He also felt the episode's handling of race was not effective; while he opined the episode's inclusion of the topic was commendable, he believed the Doctor's optimistic way of handling it was problematic for those with knowledge on racism. Vicky Jessop, writing for the Evening Standard, criticized the inclusion of the scene featuring Doctor Who fans, stating that while it was initially entertaining, it quickly became "strained".

== In print ==
Lux
- Author: James Goss
- Cover artist: Dan Liles
- Series: Doctor Who book: Target novelisations
- Publisher: BBC Books
- Publication date: 10 July 2025
- Pages: 192
- ISBN: 9781785949555

A novelisation of the episode was written by James Goss and was released on 10 July 2025 as part of the Target Collection. The audiobook will be read by Dan Starkey, who previously recurred as Commander Strax, and the cover was designed by Dan Liles.
