= Wish World =

319a – "Wish World"
- Doctor Who episode
- Promotional title-card

Cast
- Doctor: Ncuti Gatwa – Fifteenth Doctor
- Companions: Varada Sethu – Belinda Chandra; Millie Gibson – Ruby Sunday
- Others: Archie Panjabi – The Rani; Atilla Akinci – Otto Zufall; Leni Adams – Violett Zufall; Sienna-Robyn Mavanga-Phipps – Poppy; Jonah Hauer-King – Conrad Clark; Bonnie Langford – Melanie Bush; Ruth Madeley – Shirley Bingham; Jemma Redgrave – Kate Lethbridge-Stewart; Susan Twist – Susan Triad; Alexander Devrient – Colonel Christofer Ibrahim; Nila Aalia – Lakshmi Chandra; Josephine Lloyd-Welcome – Devika Babu; Anita Dobson – Mrs Flood; Hermon Berhane – Val Balham; Sam Lawton – Winnie Petheridge; Joshua J Parker – Brian Dale; Michelle Greenidge – Carla Sunday; Angela Wynter – Cherry Sunday; Carole Ann Ford – Susan Foreman; Jonathan Groff – Rogue

Production
- Directed by: Alex Sanjiv Pillai
- Written by: Russell T Davies
- Produced by: Chris May
- Executive producers: Russell T Davies; Julie Gardner; Jane Tranter; Joel Collins; Phil Collinson
- Music by: Murray Gold
- Series: Series 15
- Running time: 1st of 2-part story, 44 minutes
- First broadcast: 24 May 2025

Chronology
← Preceded by "The Interstellar Song Contest"	Followed by → "The Reality War"

"Wish World" is the seventh and penultimate episode of the fifteenth series of the British science-fiction television series Doctor Who. The episode is the first in a two-part story, concluding with "The Reality War" one week later on 31 May. In the episode, the Fifteenth Doctor (Ncuti Gatwa) and his companions, Belinda Chandra (Varada Sethu) and Ruby Sunday (Millie Gibson), find themselves living in a false, heteronormative, 1950s-era themed reality. This world was engineered by Conrad Clark at the behest of the Rani, a long-time enemy of the Doctor whose ultimate plan is to make the residents doubt the universe they live in and rescue Omega.

Written by Russell T Davies and directed by Alex Sanjiv Pillai, the episode was released on BBC iPlayer, BBC One, and Disney+ on 24 May 2025. It draws together several themes that were present throughout the fifteenth series and was filmed throughout April and May 2024. Production crews faced issues working with animals and a baby while recording took place. Interior scenes were shot at Wolf Studios Wales. The episode was viewed by 3.16 million. "Wish World" received mixed reviews; critics positively highlighted the execution of the false reality, but some criticised the characterisation of the Rani and the return of Omega. The two-part story was also given a limited theatrical release.

== Plot ==
In Bavaria, 1865, the Rani seizes a seventh son of a seventh son of a seventh son, a newborn incarnation of Desiderium, a god with the power to make wishes reality. On 23 May 2025, the Doctor and Belinda Chandra awaken in the reality created by the Rani as a married couple with an infant daughter, Poppy. Conrad Clark, who tells stories on television about the Doctor and the Time Lords to the world, uses Desiderium to project his vision of society over Earth. Ruby Sunday, aware that something is wrong with the world, is unable to convince the Doctor of her concerns.

The Doctor, living under the name John Smith, goes to work for UNIT, which in the altered reality works with National Insurance, where he witnesses the Rani returning to her Bone Palace, which presides over London. Meanwhile, Belinda begins to question her role as Poppy's mother when she cannot recall her birth. Ruby encounters UNIT's scientific advisor, Shirley Bingham, who now lives in a makeshift camp with other displaced disabled citizens. The group shares with Ruby their awareness of reality's altered state.

Upon his return home from work, the Doctor watches Conrad's transmission, which is disrupted by images of both his granddaughter Susan Foreman and bounty hunter Rogue, the latter warning him that the reality he is in is wrong, since doubting the reality causes objects to fall through other solid objects. The Doctor observes proof of this and shares his discovery with Belinda, but she calls the police about his doubts as in this reality, expressing doubts is against the law. Mrs Flood, posing as a police officer, has Belinda arrested alongside the Doctor. The pair are brought to the Bone Palace, as Ruby and Shirley use a UNIT tablet to prepare to hijack Conrad's next transmission.

In the Bone Palace, the Rani gloats to the Doctor, and reminds him of who she and Mrs Flood are. She reveals her plan is to rescue Omega, the creator of the Time Lords, by creating a compromised reality which would then be destroyed by people living in the world doubting that reality. Just before midnight on 24 May, reality begins to collapse and the Doctor falls from the Rani's tower, regains his memories and claims that Poppy is truly his daughter.

== Production ==
=== Development ===
"Wish World" was written by Russell T Davies. The return of the Rani was requested by Gatwa, as he wished to face off against her on-screen. Davies opined that while the Rani was an antagonist that would be well-known from the past, the character would not have a ton of continuity to work around, allowing him to craft her as needed. At the same time, he purposefully decided to write an incarnation of the Rani rather than a newly-created character so that newer viewers might become interested in watching her past stories. He also believed the character not to be evil, feeling that her passion for science merely made her "more amoral than immoral". The false reality was created to be heteronormative and with traditional binary gender roles.

Davies referred to the villain's for the two-part finale as the "Unholy Trinity"; counting the Rani and Mrs Flood as one being following their bigeneration in the previous story, Conrad, and a third, which was later revealed to be Omega, an enemy of the Doctor who appeared first in The Three Doctors (1972) and again in Arc of Infinity (1983). Stephen Thorne, who originally portrayed Omega, had died since his last appearance, so archive audio he recorded for the 2019 Big Finish drama "Gallifrey: Intervention Earth" was used instead. The production staff ultimately hoped to achieve a thrill, shock, and terror tone for the episode, and envisioned it as a collection of the fifteenth series overall themes with episodes that were more dramatic, tense, and scarier than they had been in the past.

=== Casting ===
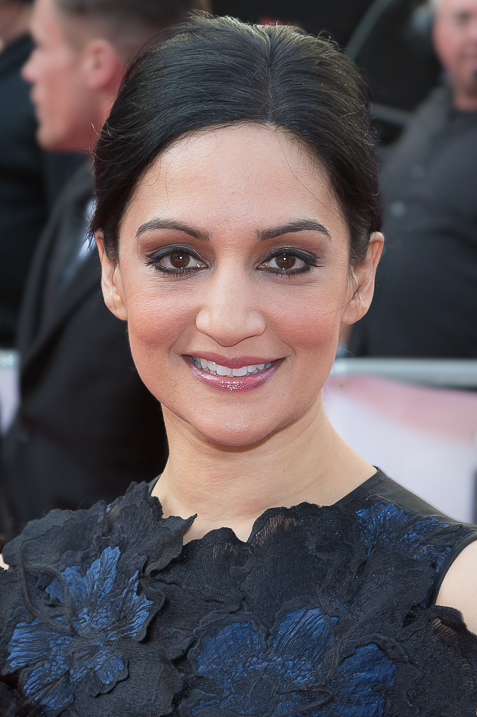
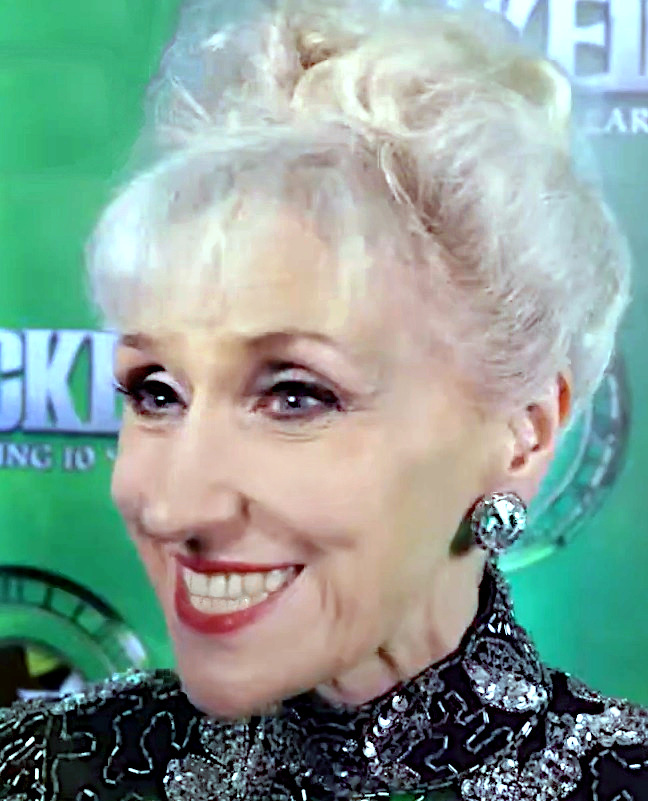
Archie Panjabi (left) and Anita Dobson (right) portray the Rani.

The episode features an ensemble cast. Ncuti Gatwa and Varada Sethu star as the fifteenth incarnation of the Doctor and his companion, Belinda Chandra, respectively. Gatwa stated that the episode provided him a fun challenge of having to portray a character different from his usual portrayal of the Doctor. Millie Gibson returns to the programme as Ruby Sunday, a former companion of the Doctor and an outgoing series regular. The two incarnations of the Rani are portrayed by Archie Panjabi and Anita Dobson, with Dobson's version also known as Mrs Flood. Panjabi was contacted personally to appear on the show as the Rani, which she accepted. After briefly reprising her role in "The Story & the Engine", Sienna-Robyn Mavanga-Phipps guest stars as Poppy, a character first introduced in "Space Babies".

After appearing in "Lucky Day", Jonah Hauer-King once again appears as Conrad Clark. Other returning cast members include Bonnie Langford, Ruth Madeley, Jemma Redgrave, Susan Twist, Alexander Devrient, Michelle Greenidge, and Angela Wynter. They play the characters of Mel Bush, Shirley Bingham, Kate Lethbridge-Stewart, Susan Triad, Christopher Ibrahim, and Carla and Cherry Sunday, respectively. Jonathan Groff makes a cameo appearance as Rogue, who was last seen in the episode of the same name. Groff's appearance was filmed shortly after he completed shooting for "Rogue". Carole Ann Ford appears in a further cameo as the Doctor's granddaughter, Susan Foreman.

=== Production design ===
UNIT's set was redressed from its previously high-tech modern appearance to a retro styled one inspired by the mid-twentieth century. The flooring was replaced with carpet whilst typewriters and rotary phones were added to the work desks. The overall design of Conrad's wish world is based on a 1950s-era style. The makeshift camp was designed to be accessible for the characters and actors portraying them, with the production team working with Julie Fernandez, an access coordinator.

The bone palace set was sculpted as a crossover between science fiction and gothic horror and was influenced by birds with the inclusion of skulls and bone-like features; the main chamber of the Palace was a redressed and redesigned set from earlier season episode "The Robot Revolution" (2025). Production designer Phil Simms included a ceiling on the set—something not typically done–shaped as a dome. The Rani's sonic device was designed to have more association with medical devices, as a result of the character's backstory as a scientist. A portion of the pattern from the costume that Kate O'Mara wore in her portrayal of the Rani was incorporated into the grip of the sonic device.

=== Filming ===
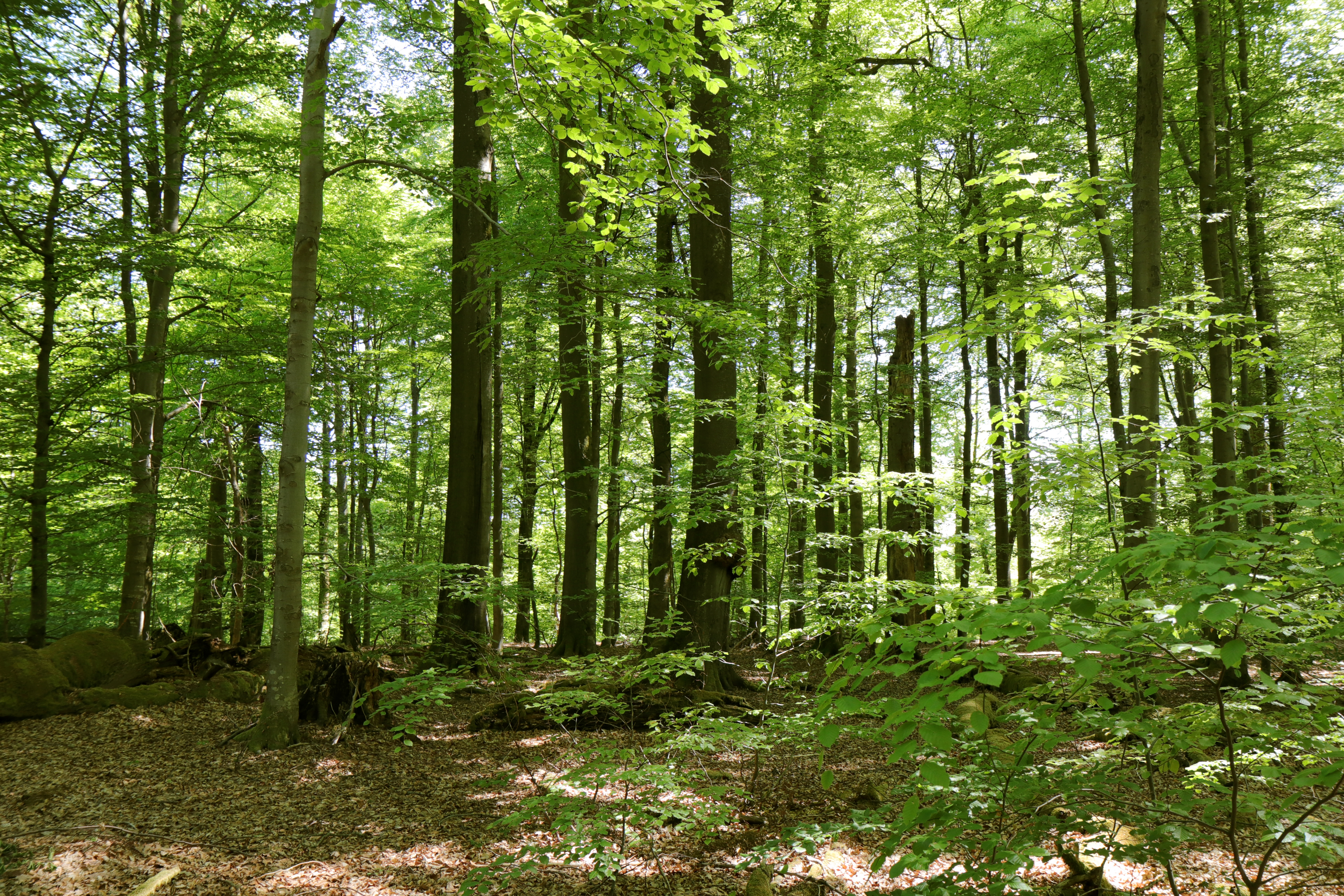
Filming for one scene took place in a forest and was intended to appear as a location similar to this one pictured in Bavaria.

"Wish World" was directed by Alex Sanjiv Pillai. Davies invited Pillai to direct the two-part series finale while production was still underway on the 2024 Christmas special, "Joy to the World", which he also directed. Recording began "a couple of weeks" after editing had wrapped on the holiday episode. To properly capture action sequences, four cameras were utilized in the bone palace set, one of which was a crane shot.

Filming for the opening scene, which is set in Bavaria, took place in a forest, where a large number of insects disturbed the production crew. This scene also utilised numerous animals, including an owl, six ducks, and a horse; these animals proved troublesome to work with, with the horse at one point urinating while on set. Numerous child actors were also involved in the scene, one of which was a baby that caused additional issues for the crew.

Mavanga-Phipps recorded her pieces of the episode on soundstage 2 at Wolf Studios Wales on 10 May 2024. Soundstage 3 contained the set for the bone palace, while scenes at the UNIT tower was built on soundstage 1 and were filmed on 11 April. The scene where Mel witnesses London falling underground around her was achieved by placing Langford in the centre of a 360 degree camera dolly and simultaneously rotating the camera, lighting, and a green screen around her while she looked around.

== Broadcast and reception ==
Professional ratings
Aggregate scores
Source	Rating
Rotten Tomatoes (Tomatometer)	71%
Review scores
Source	Rating
Bleeding Cool	8/10
GamesRadar+	4/5 stars
IGN	3/10
Radio Times	(Note: Combined rating with "The Reality War")
Vulture	3/5 stars

=== Broadcast ===
"Wish World" was simultaneously released on BBC iPlayer at 8 a.m. British Summer Time (BST) in the United Kingdom and on Disney+ in the United States at 12 a.m. Pacific Daylight Time on 24 May 2025. A BBC One broadcast of the episode occurred later in the day at 7:10 p.m. BST. Disney also handled international distribution of the episode. It had a limited theatrical release along with the following episode at cinemas in the UK and Ireland on 31 May.

=== Ratings ===
The episode received overnight ratings of 1.8 million, placing it as the fifth most-watched programme the day of broadcast. The episode received a total of 3.16 million consolidated viewers across 7 days, and a total of 3.80 million consolidated viewers across 28 days.

=== Critical reception ===
On the review aggregator website Rotten Tomatoes, 71% of 7 critics' reviews are positive. A largely positive review for GamesRadar+ from Will Salmon highlighted the episode's use of its characters, the execution of the false reality, and the social commentary of the real world communicated through the heteronormative reality. In a review for Engadget, Daniel Cooper brought attention to the horror in the segments in the false reality, as well as the cliffhanger involving Captain Poppy. Ryan Woodrow, in a review for Newsweek, emphasised the episode's use of Conrad and the false reality, the surprise returns of Rogue and the Pantheon, and the twist on the trope of protagonists breaking out of a false reality. Stefan Mohamed from Den of Geek highlighted the false reality's design and execution, as well as the characterization and acting performances.

Robert Anderson from IGN criticised the episode, finding the execution of the characters weak and too reliant on fan service in the form of the Rani and Omega, which Anderson felt was unearned and made the story rely too heavily on obscure characters. Mohamed found fault with the return of Omega, believing that it was weak and too reliant on the series' past; he further criticised the Rani's explanation of her plan, stating that it was "not the most elegant exposition that Davies has ever written." Cooper disliked the return of Omega, believing the character to be too obscure and not interesting as an antagonist, while also disliking the execution of the Rani, finding her plan nonsensical. Salmon opined that too many plot threads were set up for "The Reality War" and that the execution of the Rani's character was too similar to another series antagonist, The Master. Milo negatively compared the Rani to the Master and criticised the use of Varada Sethu and the return of Omega. Megan Hughes praised Archie Panjabi as the Rani and the world but criticised the Rani's character and the poor use of the supporting cast, as well as the return of Omega. Daniel Cooper called the episode "frustrating", criticising the poor use of the supporting cast.
