= The Reality War =

319b – "The Reality War"
- Doctor Who episode
- Promotional title-card

Cast
- Doctor: Ncuti Gatwa – Fifteenth Doctor
- Companions: Varada Sethu – Belinda Chandra; Millie Gibson – Ruby Sunday
- Others: Jodie Whittaker – Thirteenth Doctor; Billie Piper (Note: Piper's credit did not include a character name.); Archie Panjabi – The Rani; Anita Dobson – Mrs Flood; Steph de Whalley – Anita Benn; Sam Lawton – Winnie Petheridge; Ruth Madeley – Shirley Bingham; Michelle Greenidge – Carla Sunday; Jonah Hauer-King – Conrad Clark; Sienna-Robyn Mavanga-Phipps – Poppy; Jemma Redgrave – Kate Lethbridge-Stewart; Susan Twist – Susan Triad; Alexander Devrient – Colonel Christofer Ibrahim; Aidan Cook – The Vlinx; Yasmin Finney – Rose Noble; Bonnie Langford – Melanie Bush; Angela Wynter – Cherry Sunday; Nicholas Briggs – Voice of Omega; Nila Aalia – Lakshmi Chandra

Production
- Directed by: Alex Sanjiv Pillai
- Written by: Russell T Davies
- Produced by: Chris May
- Executive producers: Russell T Davies; Julie Gardner; Jane Tranter; Joel Collins; Phil Collinson
- Music by: Murray Gold
- Series: Series 15
- Running time: 2nd of 2-part story, 66 minutes
- First broadcast: 31 May 2025

Chronology
← Preceded by "Wish World"	Followed by → —

"The Reality War" is the eighth and final episode of the fifteenth series of the British science-fiction television series Doctor Who. Written by Russell T Davies and directed by Alex Sanjiv Pillai, it is the second of a two-part story alongside the preceding episode, "Wish World". The episode was released simultaneously on BBC iPlayer, BBC One, and Disney+ on 31 May 2025. Ncuti Gatwa stars in his final regular appearance as the Fifteenth Doctor. Varada Sethu and Millie Gibson star as his companions, Belinda Chandra and Ruby Sunday, respectively, in their final appearances. Numerous other performers from Gatwa's time on the show reprise their roles. Jodie Whittaker also returns as the Thirteenth Doctor, while the ending reintroduces Billie Piper, who previously played Rose Tyler, to the series when the Doctor regenerates.

The episode depicts the Doctor and his allies uniting to combat the threat of the Rani, who aims to bring Omega, the first Time Lord, back to the universe to re-create her and the Doctor's home planet Gallifrey under her rule. The Doctor aims to stop the Rani while also preserving the life of Poppy, an infant child the Doctor had with Belinda in an altered reality, who will be erased from existence if the Rani's plans succeed. Primary filming took place in 2024, with some re-shoots reportedly taking place into 2025 causing delayed edits to the episode. "The Reality War" was viewed by a total of 3.48 million. It was also given a limited theatrical release alongside "Wish World". The episode received mixed reviews from critics, who criticised the handling of Belinda's character, the usage of the Rani and Omega as antagonists, the overall plot, and Piper's return, despite some praise for Whittaker's cameo. This is to date the last Doctor Who episode before the series went on an indefinite hiatus in June 2026.

== Plot ==
As Earth collapses out of reality, the Doctor is rescued by Anita Benn, whom he befriended while spending a year with. (Note: As seen in "Joy to the World") She brings him to the Time Hotel. He learns the Rani put Earth into a time loop by using a wish from Conrad Clark and Desiderium, an infant god with the power to transform wishes into reality. The Doctor and Anita use the Time Hotel's doors to restore the memories of his companion, Belinda Chandra, and everyone at UNIT, while Ruby Sunday and other UNIT agents have their memories restored via chip implants.

The Rani and Mrs. Flood confront the Doctor, revealing their plan to bring Omega into the universe and use him as a gene bank to create a new race of Time Lords under their rule. The Doctor has Belinda take Poppy, their daughter created in this altered reality, into a special chamber to prevent Poppy being erased once reality is restored to normal. He infiltrates the Rani's palace as Omega - now a massive, skeletal monstrosity - is brought into existence. Omega states he intends to consume all and eats the Rani. Mrs. Flood flees as the Doctor forces Omega back into his prison using the Vindicator. Ruby breaches the palace to steal Desiderium. Ruby wishes for Conrad to be happy in a new life and for his wish to be undone. The Doctor rejoins her in the TARDIS and makes a wish for Desiderium to no longer grant wishes.

Reality is restored back to normal, though with minor differences. The now human Desiderium is given to Ruby's family, and Anita departs for the Time Hotel, revealing to the Doctor that "the Boss" extends greetings to him. The Doctor and Belinda prepare to depart with Poppy, only for Poppy to be erased with only Ruby remembering her. Ruby persuades the Doctor that Poppy's erasure is a mistake, reminding him of how he saved her as a baby as well. (Note: As seen in "The Church on Ruby Road") In an effort to restore Poppy, the Doctor departs in the TARDIS where, briefly assisted by his thirteenth incarnation, he initiates a regeneration so that the energy of it can be used in conjunction with the time vortex to slightly shift the timeline. The shift results in a timeline where Poppy exists as Belinda's daughter, but not his. After bidding farewell, he departs to begin his next regeneration in the presence of the star of Joy, appearing to take on a new incarnation resembling former companion Rose Tyler.

== Production ==
=== Development ===
"The Reality War" was written by Russell T Davies. After being mentioned in the first part of the story, the episode re-introduces Omega to Doctor Who after last appearing in the programme 42 years earlier. Davies originally intended to write a new Time Lord in place of Omega, but as the script developed he felt that using the already established character was a better fit.

Davies said that the story wraps up several threads that have been running throughout the Fifteenth Doctor's era, dating back to the 2023 episode "The Church on Ruby Road". After warning prior to release that the plot "shakes up the lore of Gallifrey", Davies included an explanation for the concept of "bigeneration"—a twist on the long-time concept of regeneration—that was first seen in "The Giggle" (2023). He also revealed that he long had the idea of the Doctor falling to his death on a balcony, but never had a resolution for the concept. Steven Moffat's creation of the Time Hotel for "Joy to the World" ultimately provided him that solution as doors from the hotel could open into any location or time period.

Despite being two different versions of the same character, the character dynamic between the Rani and Mrs Flood were written to have separate personalities, with the former taking credit for their plans while the latter handled much of the physical work. This dynamic was also further affected once Omega was added, with the Rani seeing Omega as someone worthy of worship. The read-through of the episode was dedicated to the memory of Kate O'Mara, who played the original incarnation of the Rani.

=== Casting ===
The episode sees the departure of Ncuti Gatwa, Millie Gibson, and Varada Sethu in their roles as the fifteenth incarnation of The Doctor, Ruby Sunday, and Belinda Chandra, respectively. While Gatwa insisted it was "always the plan" for him to only spend a short time playing the lead role because of its "physically and emotionally" demanding aspects, comments he initially made about returning for a third series caused the belief that he either departed or was let go from the programme for other reasons such as declining viewing figures, uncertainty over Doctor Who's future with Disney+ and as a whole, or due to displeasure from executives. In an interview with BBC Breakfast on 13 July 2025, Gatwa clarified his statement that he had chosen to quit his role after two series due to the mental and physical toll it was taking on him, but added that he would not rule out returning to the show in the future.

Archie Panjabi and Anita Dobson both portray the Rani in the episode, while Jonah Hauer-King, Ruth Madeley, Michelle Greenidge, Sienna-Robyn Mavanga-Phipps, Jemma Redgrave, Susan Twist, Alexander Devrient, Bonnie Langford, and Angela Wynter reprise their roles as from the previous episode as Conrad Clark, Shirley Bingham, Carla Sunday, Poppy, Kate Lethbridge-Stewart, Susan Triad, Colonel Christopher Ibrahim, Melanie Bush, and Cherry Sunday, respectively. Aidan Cook also appears as the Vlinx, Yasmin Finney appears as Rose Noble, and Steph de Whalley reappears as Anita Benn. Omega was voiced by Nicholas Briggs, with the character's physical appearance being handled via computer generated graphics.

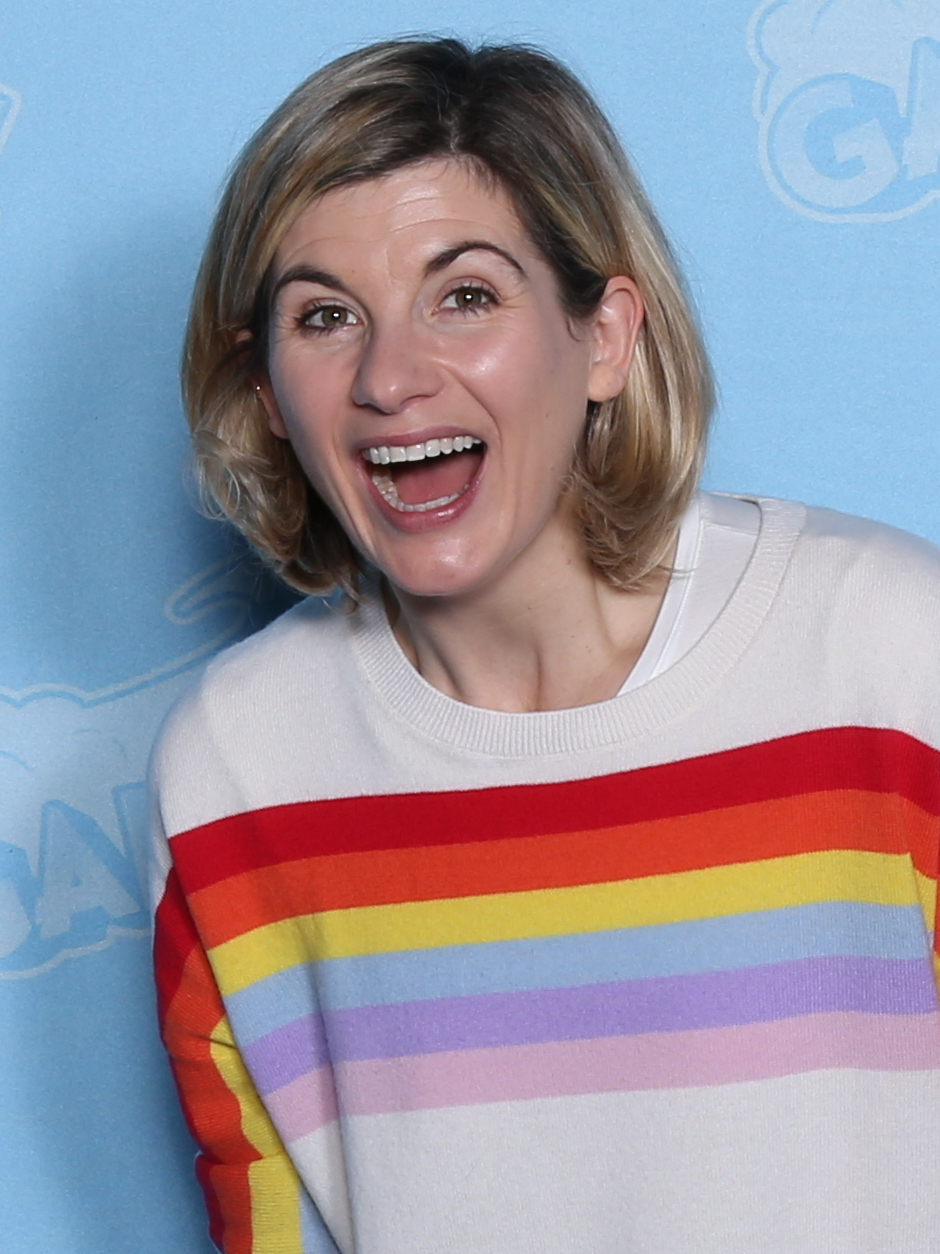
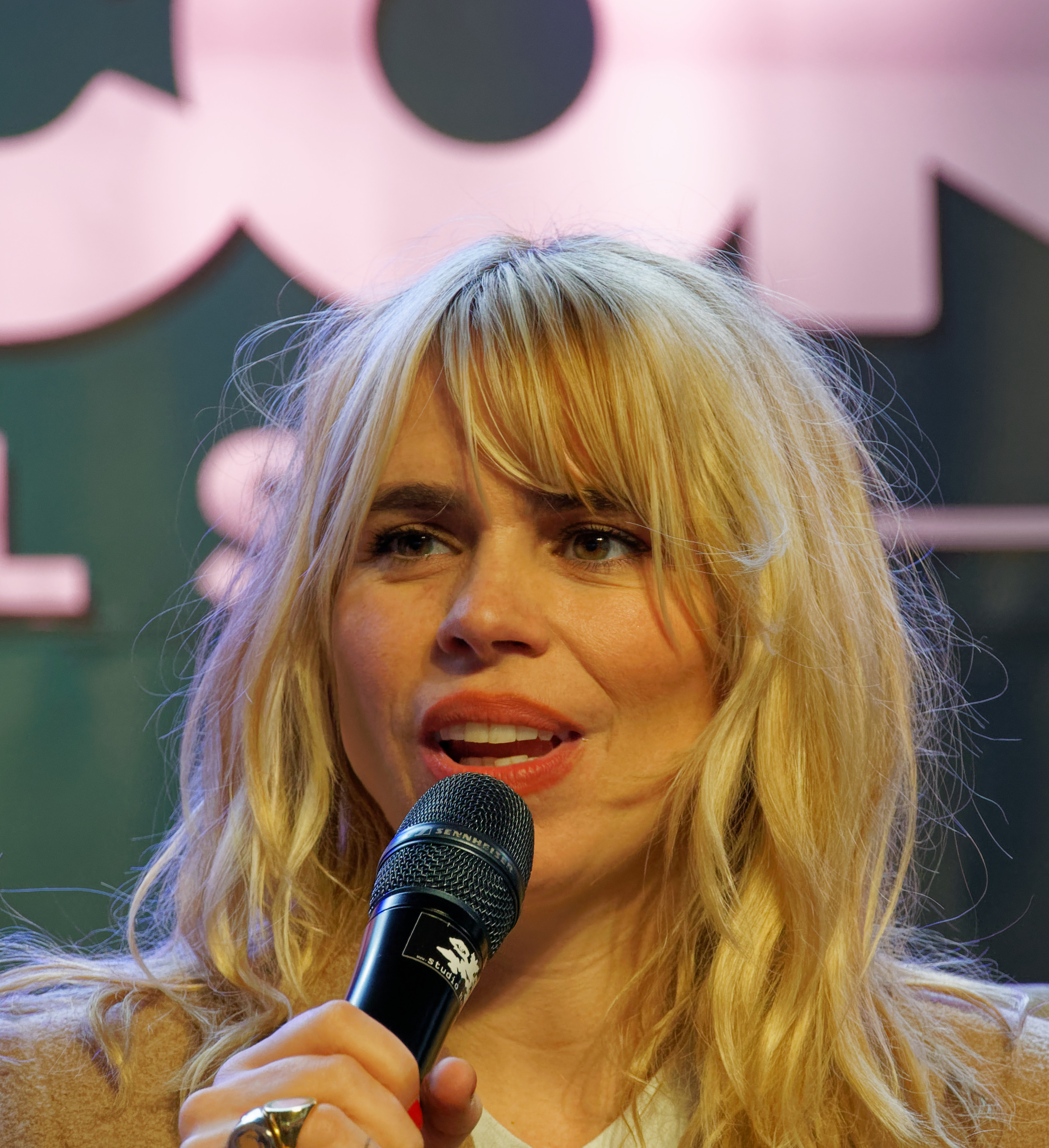
Jodie Whittaker (left) reprises her role as the Thirteenth Doctor, and Billie Piper (right) appears as the result of the Fifteenth Doctor's regeneration.

Jodie Whittaker reprised her role as the Thirteenth Doctor, marking her first reappearance since "The Power of the Doctor" (2022). Whittaker's name was disguised as "Petrol" on the daily call sheets to hide her return prior to filming, with the Fifteenth Doctor also named as "Clive" on Whittaker's copy of the script. Whittaker said it was special to be part of a regeneration episode with another performer, as she had filmed her regeneration scenes independently of both her predecessor, Peter Capaldi, and successor, David Tennant.

Davies said that he wanted to include a scene where the Thirteenth and Fifteenth Doctors met because he felt like there was a missing link between the two due to the casting of Tennant as the Fourteenth Doctor. Tight filming schedules also required Whittaker to be flown in for her one day on set as she was abroad while recording was underway. In "The Reality War", Whittaker wore a wig as her hair was now long and brown, rather than the short blonde style her character previously had.

Billie Piper also returned to Doctor Who in this episode when the Fifteenth Doctor regenerates into a character portrayed by her at the end of the episode, after last appearing in the 2013 fiftieth anniversary special, "The Day of the Doctor". While Piper's official role remains undisclosed, with the closing credits merely reading "introducing Billie Piper", some sources assumed her to be portraying the sixteenth incarnation of the Doctor. According to Piper, she was approached in a "very last minute" capacity.

=== Filming and post-production ===
"The Reality War" was directed by Alex Sanjiv Pillai. Gatwa's action sequences on a personal transporter were filmed in front of a green screen. A scene where Anita opens a door to see the Third Doctor and the Daleks was originally intended to be created using archive footage from the 1972 Doctor Who serial Day of the Daleks. However, Pillai came up with the idea to use a practical Dalek prop in the foreground for a better connection between the two stories. The scene with Omega required shooting the scene in a wider shot to accommodate Omega's size, with Panjabi being strung on wires to allow Omega to pick her up.

Principal photography on series fifteen finished in May 2024, Post-production on the episode was still incomplete by April 2025, something that Davies attributed to the large number of visual effects that the episode contained. Composer Murray Gold also had appendicitis, further delaying the episode. Davies hoped to have the final edit approved by 17 April.

=== Alternative ending ===
In this promotional photo for the episode released by Disney+, the Doctor and Belinda can be seen at a party. This deleted scene was removed from the final cut of the episode.

Additional filming reportedly took place in February 2025. The additional scenes, which comprised a third of the episode, were speculated to have been necessary to allow Gatwa to leave the series, and were also rumoured to include the appearance of Whittaker and Piper. Additionally, some scenes were supposedly removed from the original final cut, one of which would have introduced Archie Lal as Belinda's father Hari.

Information about another deleted scene arose from a promotional photo released by Disney+ that featured the Doctor and Belinda dancing at a party, a segment that would have been the final moments and ultimately never appeared in the episode. Susan Foreman, a character portrayed by Carole Ann Ford, who was re-introduced to the programme after a forty year absence as the Doctor's granddaughter two episodes prior, and Ruby would also have been present in this final scene. Ford's appearance would have also resulted in a cliffhanger for the next series. Comments made on a TikTok account run by Mavanga-Phipps's mother suggested that the original plot would have also revealed Poppy to actually be the Doctor's daughter and Susan's mother.

Ford later confirmed the existence of the cut scene in response to an interview question about whether Susan knew her mother, stating: "You didn’t see the episode which was to sort of introduce my coming back, where I was holding hands with a [...] beautiful little tiny black child, three years old. And we were watching through the window somewhere where the audience wasn’t supposed to know where we supposed to be. And we were watching by newly-embodied grandfather, who was now Ncuti [Gatwa], and watching him have a wonderful time singing and dancing in a party in a shop opposite where we were."

== Broadcast and reception ==
Professional ratings
Aggregate scores
Source	Rating
Rotten Tomatoes (Tomatometer)	54%
Review scores
Source	Rating
The A.V. Club	B−
Bleeding Cool	8/10
The Daily Telegraph	2/5 stars
GamesRadar+	3/5 stars
i	3/5 stars
IGN	4/10
Radio Times	(Note: Combined rating with "Wish World")
Vulture	3/5 stars

=== Broadcast ===
No advanced screenings for the press were held in order to keep the ending moments of the episode confidential. "The Reality War" was released simultaneously on BBC One and BBC iPlayer in the United Kingdom, and on Disney+ in the United States, at 6:50 p.m. British Summer Time (BST) and 10:50 a.m. Pacific Daylight Time, respectively, on 31 May 2025. It is the first global simulcast of a Doctor Who episode since "The Church on Ruby Road". With a total runtime of 70 minutes, it is the longest Doctor Who episode of the fifteenth series. The episode, along with the story's first part, "Wish World", received a simultaneous limited theatrical release in cinemas in the UK and Ireland.

=== Ratings ===
The episode received overnight viewing figures of 2.2 million, the second highest of the day. The episode received a total of 3.48 million consolidated viewers across 7 days, and a total of 3.81 million consolidated viewers across 28 days.

"Wish World" and "The Reality War" brought in £381,725, ranking second for event screenings of the day at the UK box office, only behind Peppa Meets the Baby.

=== Critical reception ===
On the review aggregator website Rotten Tomatoes, 54% of 13 critics' reviews are positive. Writing for GamesRadar+, Will Salmon highlighted the episode's ambitious scope, Jodie Whittaker's cameo and the emotional resonance of certain scenes, noting specifically the "touching send-off for Ncuti Gatwa's Doctor". Salmon criticised the handling of Belinda's character arc, believing that having her become a mother caused her arc to be begin and end with "toxic men"; as well as the inclusion of Omega and the Rani, which he found underwhelming. Stefan Mohamed from Den of Geek criticised the sidelining of Belinda in the chamber, noting that she "functionally stops existing as a narrative presence"; while acknowledging the surprise elements like Gatwa's unexpected regeneration, Mohamed disliked the episode's storytelling choices and felt that Belinda's character arc was ultimately wasted and overshadowed by Ruby's.

Robert Anderson from IGN found the episode to be "overstuffed", believing the episode's villains lacking in presence, while also disliking the end of Belinda's arc within the series, feeling that it was too rushed rather than a poor concept. Anderson, however, did highlight Whittaker's brief appearance as the Thirteenth Doctor. Michael Hogan, writing for The Daily Telegraph, criticised the episode's narrative, which he felt had too many characters. He disliked Poppy's plotline as he felt it was hard to care about, and the usage of Omega as an antagonist. However, he praised Panjabi's performance as the Rani. Stephen Kelly of i criticised the subplot involving Poppy and the usage of Belinda, though he praised Whittaker's cameo. Isobel Lewis of The A.V. Club similarly criticised several aspects of the "incredibly rushed" episode, including the usage of Panjabi's Rani and Omega, and Conrad's story conclusion. Jennifer Zhan of Vulture criticised the usage of the Rani and Omega, as well as Conrad and Belinda's story arc conclusions. Piper's return was met with criticism for relying too much on nostalgia through the use of previous cast members.
