= The Story & the Engine =

317 – "The Story & the Engine"
- Doctor Who episode
- Promotional title-card

Cast
- Doctor: Ncuti Gatwa – Fifteenth Doctor
- Companion: Varada Sethu – Belinda Chandra
- Others: Sule Rimi – Omo Esosa; Ariyon Bakare – The Barber; Stefan Adegbola – Rashid Abubakar; Jordan Adene – Tunde Adebayo; Michael Balogun – Obioma Okoli; Michelle Asante – Abena; Simon Bailey – Paramedic; Adrian Pang – Consultant; Tessa Bell-Briggs – Patient; Anita Dobson – Mrs Flood; Inua Ellams – Market Seller; Funmi James – Security Guard; Sienna-Robyn Mavanga-Phipps – Poppy; Jo Martin – The Doctor

Production
- Directed by: Makalla McPherson
- Written by: Inua Ellams
- Produced by: Vicki Delow
- Executive producers: Russell T Davies; Julie Gardner; Jane Tranter; Joel Collins; Phil Collinson
- Music by: Murray Gold
- Series: Series 15
- Running time: 47 minutes
- First broadcast: 10 May 2025

Chronology
← Preceded by "Lucky Day"	Followed by → "The Interstellar Song Contest"

"The Story & the Engine" is the fifth episode of the fifteenth series of the British science-fiction television series Doctor Who. It was written by Inua Ellams, directed by Makalla McPherson, and released on BBC iPlayer, BBC One, and Disney+ on 10 May 2025. In the episode, the Fifteenth Doctor (Ncuti Gatwa) and his companion, Belinda Chandra (Varada Sethu), visit Lagos, Nigeria. There, they get trapped in a barbershop by an enigmatic figure, known only as the Barber, who uses the power of stories to power an engine he constructed.

The episode shares a similar setting, cast, and themes to the Barber Shop Chronicles, a play written by Ellams. Featuring a largely BIPOC cast and exploring motifs of identity, it was primarily filmed at Wolf Studios Wales in Cardiff in early 2024. Some footage was recorded in Lagos, with the primary goal to make the soundstage set look authentic. The episode was viewed by 2.71 million viewers, the lowest total in the show's 62-year history to date, but received generally positive reviews from critics, particularly for its script.

== Plot ==
The Fifteenth Doctor and Belinda Chandra arrive in Lagos, Nigeria in 2019. Belinda remains in the TARDIS while The Doctor visits Omo, a friend who runs a barbershop. The Doctor discovers Omo and several others have gone missing, and upon entering the shop, becomes trapped inside. Omo reveals that a mysterious figure dubbed "The Barber" took control of the shop and forces the missing men to power an engine by telling stories. The Barber is working alongside a woman named Abby, who the Doctor recognises but cannot identify.

The Doctor is unhappy when he finds out that Omo told the Barber about him. The Doctor attempts to escape the barbershop but nearly falls out because the shop is traveling on a giant colossal spider walking along a massive web. The Barber explains that the shop exists both in Lagos and on the spider, and that only he and Abby are able to leave. Belinda arrives and also becomes trapped. The Doctor goads the Barber into revealing his identity: a storyteller who assisted many gods by spreading and preserving their stories using the web, which is also called the Nexus. The Nexus functioned too well, which led the gods to cut him off it. The Doctor realises that Abby is actually Abena, the daughter of Anansi, who he abandoned while in his Fugitive incarnation due to other commitments, and that Abena allied with the Barber to seek revenge.

The Barber reveals that he intends to reach the centre of the Nexus in order to cut off all the gods from the web and thus kill them, which would destabilise human culture. Abena, having a change of heart after being convinced by the others, braids the Doctor's hair into a map, guiding him to the centre of the engine's power source. The Doctor and Belinda reconfigure the heart of the engine to allow the Doctor to power it with his own life story. The energy is too much, and the engine begins to destroy itself. The Doctor persuades the Barber to release the trapped people and to escape with them. The engine is destroyed, returning the shop to normal.

The missing men all return to their loved ones, and Omo apologises and makes up with the Doctor. Omo retires and puts the Barber in charge of running the shop, while Abena goes off to live her life. The Doctor and Belinda depart as the Doctor tells her the story of how he met Omo.

== Production ==
=== Development ===
The episode was written by Inua Ellams, marking his first full contribution to Doctor Who. Ellams was originally approached by the series' previous showrunner, Chris Chibnall, to become involved with it; on the recommendation of fellow writers, Chibnall had read his and Vinay Patel's essays in The Good Immigrant, which both made mention of watching and enjoying the programme in their youth and childhoods. Whilst Patel would subsequently author one script ("Demons of the Punjab") and co-author another ("Fugitive of the Judoon") under Chibnall, Ellams's writing contributions during the earlier development of the show's shortened, COVID-19-hit thirteenth series ultimately did not extend as far as a completed episode.

Ellams aimed to write for the series again following the September 2021 announcement of Russell T Davies' return as showrunner. He first attempted to reach out to Davies through his agent, but was told he was busy with early work on devising his own stories. Ellams instead sent Davies a direct message via Instagram, to which he responded, with the two entering initial talks for him to write an episode. In addition to this, Ellams was personally recommended to Davies by series star Ncuti Gatwa, unaware that the two were already in contact. Initially, a different, "much larger" idea had been developed by Ellams, but was rejected by Davies because it was too similar to another script that was already being developed for the series. After the other writer was ultimately unable to complete their script, Davies suggested to Ellams that he write a story set in a barbershop, having previously seen his stage play Barber Shop Chronicles. According to Ellams, despite the play and the episode being independent ideas with original characters, he views them as having "connective tissue" for their underlying concepts.

The idea for the Barber came to Ellams after he learned that the term for "ghost writer" in the French language was "le nègre" (lit. 'Black person'). He decided to expand on that concept by making the antagonist an African male who had written stories for everyone and did not receive any credit for their work. This was later connected to Anansi, a West African mythological character known for associations with stories. Ellams also wrote the episode as a "companion piece" to the 2024 Doctor Who episode "Dot and Bubble", because of how the Doctor's skin colour played into the story. According to Davies, Ellams's episode was initially intended to be sequenced directly after "Dot and Bubble" as part of the fourteenth series, but was ultimately pushed back into the fifteenth, due to the later decision to instead include a script written by Kate Herron and Briony Redman ("Rogue").

At one time, there were concerns over whether the episode's antagonist was "too frightening". However, throughout writing it, Ellams kept advice given to him by Chris Chibnall that the series is "a sci-fi and horror for eight-year-olds, but also for all ages" in mind. The episode explores themes of "identity, displacement, and destiny". Elements of two poems written by Ellams for his 2020 poetry compilation book The Actual, "Fuck / Time" and "Fuck / Drums", are repurposed in it; the former is used for the first story told about Yo-Yo Ma, and the latter references Doctor Who, mentioning the TARDIS in an expression of Afrofuturism. The episode's setting of Lagos, Nigeria, was identified by Gatwa as a "dream storyline" for him in 2022, prior to it being written.

=== Casting ===
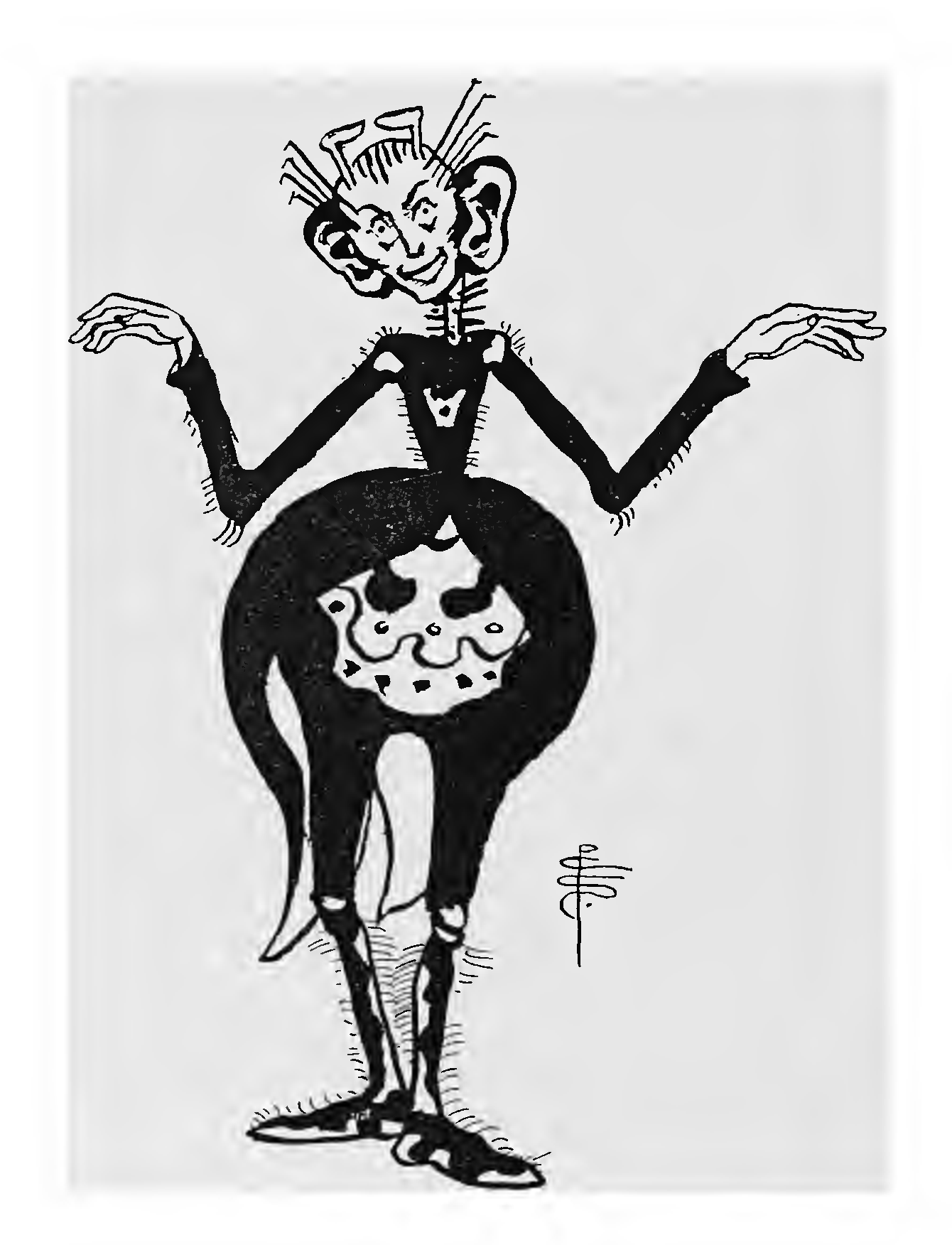
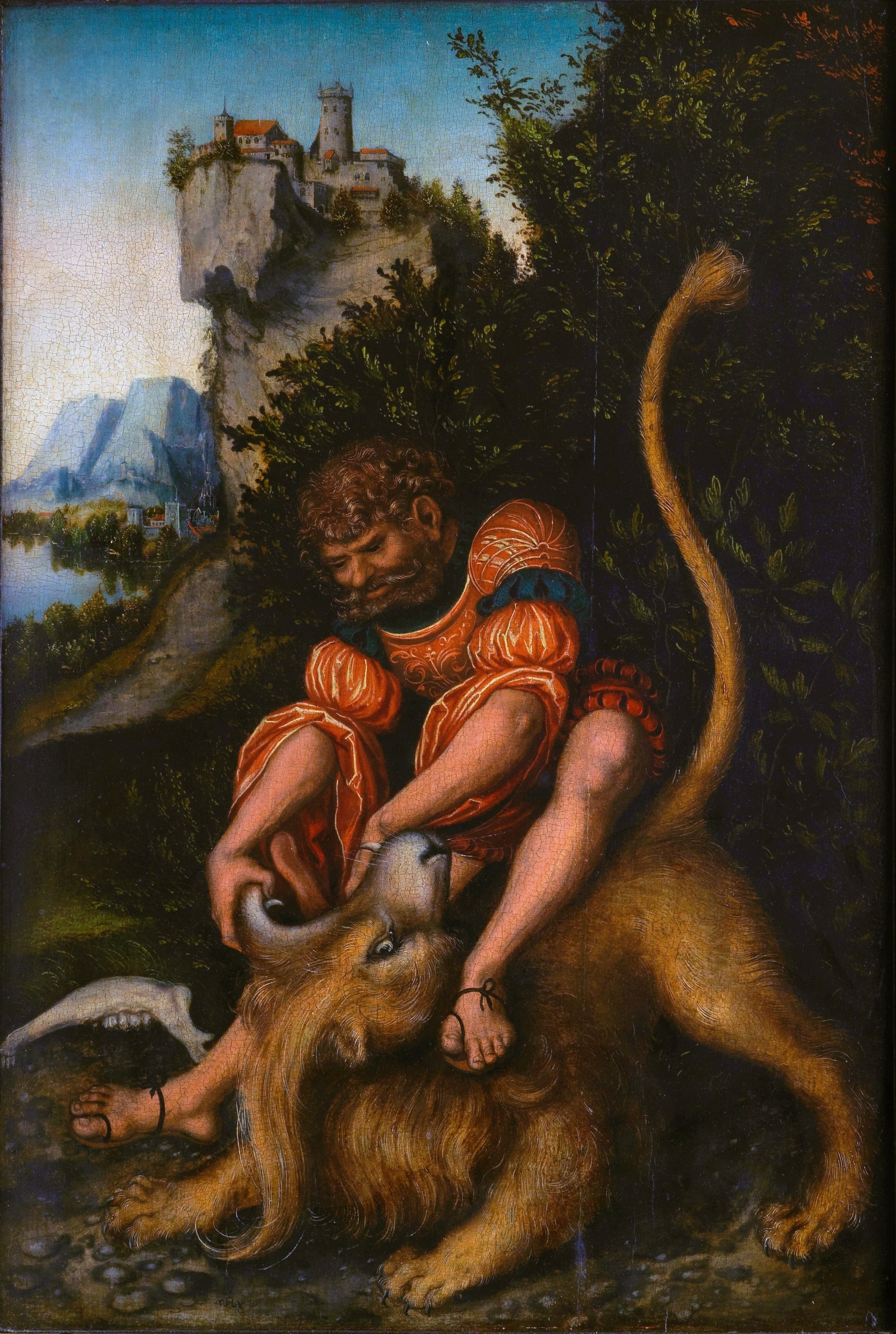
The portrayal of the barber was inspired by the folktale Anansi (left) and the biblical figure Samson (right).

With the exception of flashback scenes and archive footage, the episode features a cast entirely comprising people of colour. Gatwa and Varada Sethu star as the fifteenth incarnation of the Doctor and his companion, Belinda Chandra. Ariyon Bakare guest stars as "the Barber", Sule Rimi appears as Omo, the barbershop's owner, while Stefan Adegbola, Jordan Adene, and Michael Balogun portray customers. Michelle Asante portrays Abena. Bakare made his character similar to Anansi and the biblical figure Samson. Rimi and Balogun had previously worked with Ellams when they performed in his play Barber Shop Chronicles. Rimi had also appeared in Doctor Who twice before in the 2005 episode "Aliens of London" as a member of UNIT and in the 2015 story "The Magician's Apprentice" as a newsreader, while Bakare appeared as Leandro in "The Woman Who Lived" (2015).

The episode's author, Inua Ellams makes a cameo appearance in the episode, which came about after he made a joke about appearing in the episode during a meeting. Jo Martin reprises her role as the Fugitive Doctor. Showrunner Russell T Davies stated that because the episode explored the Doctor's ethnicity, it "felt like Jo Martin was missing" and that he wanted to "acknowledge her" and show that the character "still exists." Additionally, all of the past performers who regularly starred as the Doctor appear in archive footage. The remainder of the guest cast includes Adrian Pang and Anita Dobson as a consultant and Mrs Flood, respectively. Sienna-Robyn Mavanga-Phipps briefly reprises her role as Poppy from "Space Babies" (2024), with her appearance to Belinda unexplained during the episode. Eighty extras were used in the Nigerian market scene.

=== Filming ===
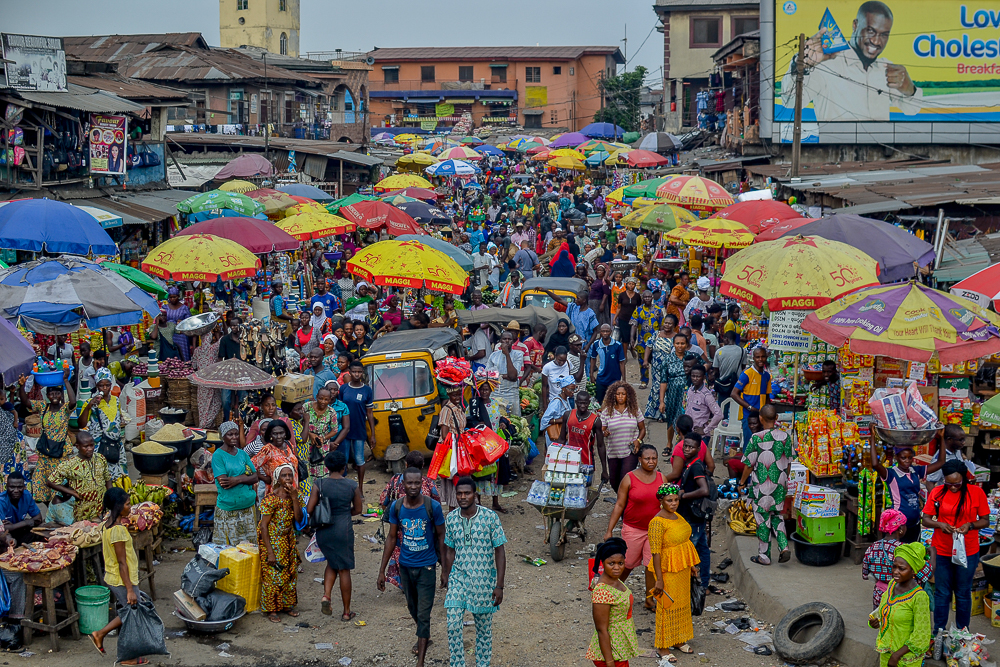
Establishing shots were recorded with a drone in Lagos, Nigeria.

"The Story & the Engine" was directed by Makalla McPherson. It was filmed in early 2024 and was placed in the fourth production block of the series along with the following episode, "The Interstellar Song Contest". Although both episodes in a single block would normally be overseen by the same director, complexity of the next story required them to have individual directors. Filming on the episode coincided with Gatwa's appearance at the 96th Academy Awards for Barbie.

The production team initially considered actually filming the episode in Lagos, Nigeria, where the story is set, but found the prospect of the full cast and crew travelling there to be too expensive. Instead, a set was built on soundstage 7 at Wolf Studios Wales in Cardiff. However, establishing drone shots were still recorded in Lagos. McPherson used previsualization to see a three-dimensional virtual version of the set prior to construction, which was used to plan blocking, action sequences, and set design. She said that the main obstacle was creating a proper dynamic among the cast since the episode had a single main set.

The Nigerian market scene was filmed at Wolf Studios on 19 February 2024. Only one day of shooting was allocated to that scene before the sound stage began conversion to the exterior of the barbershop and alleyways. The back of the barbershop and engine room were constructed on a separate soundstage. Multiple Nigerian consultants were involved with various areas of production to ensure authentic representation of sets, hair styles, and spoken languages.

== Broadcast and reception ==
Professional ratings
Aggregate scores
Source	Rating
Rotten Tomatoes (Tomatometer)	89%
Review scores
Source	Rating
The A.V. Club	A−
Bleeding Cool	10/10
GamesRadar+	4/5 stars
IGN	7/10
Radio Times	2/5 stars
Vulture	5/5 stars

=== Broadcast ===
"The Story & the Engine" was simultaneously released on BBC iPlayer at 8 a.m. British Summer Time (BST) in the United Kingdom and on Disney+ in the United States at 12 a.m. Pacific Daylight Time on 10 May 2025. A BBC One broadcast of the episode followed at 7:10 p.m. BST. Disney also handled international distribution of the episode.

=== Ratings ===
The episode received overnight ratings of 1.59 million. The episode received a total of 2.71 million consolidated viewers across 7 days, and a total of 3.26 million consolidated viewers across 28 days.

=== Critical reception ===
On the review aggregator website Rotten Tomatoes, 89% of 9 critics' reviews are positive. Stefan Mohamed, writing for Den of Geek, responded positively to the episode, praising the usage of the Doctor's race, Ellams's writing, the episode's settings, and the episode's unique atmosphere, but criticised the episode's overcomplicated ideas and a lack of identifiable stakes. Will Salmon from GamesRadar+ cited the episode as "one of the most original and ambitious episodes this show has produced in years", pointing out the episode's unique way of telling its story. Robert Anderson, writing for IGN, emphasised the episode's story and premise, though criticised the episode's reliance on gods, feeling it was overused due to the number of god-like entities that had appeared in recent episodes. Adi Tantimedh, writing for Bleeding Cool, praised the episode, highlighting Bakare's performance, the episode's unique presentation, and the characterization and writing of the Doctor. The episode was shortlisted for the 2026 Hugo Awards in the category "Best Dramatic Presentation, Short Form".

Ryan Woodrow, writing for Newsweek, stated that while he enjoyed the episode's final act, he felt the episode needed a narrower focus; he believed the risks were not well-defined until halfway through the episode, which he felt would leave viewers confused, and that the men trapped in the shop "fade into the background" once danger was defined. Patrick Mulkern, writing for Radio Times, offered a negative review, criticising the episode's depiction of Nigeria, and also criticised Jo Martin's cameo as "wasted".
