= Fifteenth Doctor =

Incarnation of a fictional character from Doctor Who

The Doctor
The Fifteenth Doctor
- Doctor Who character
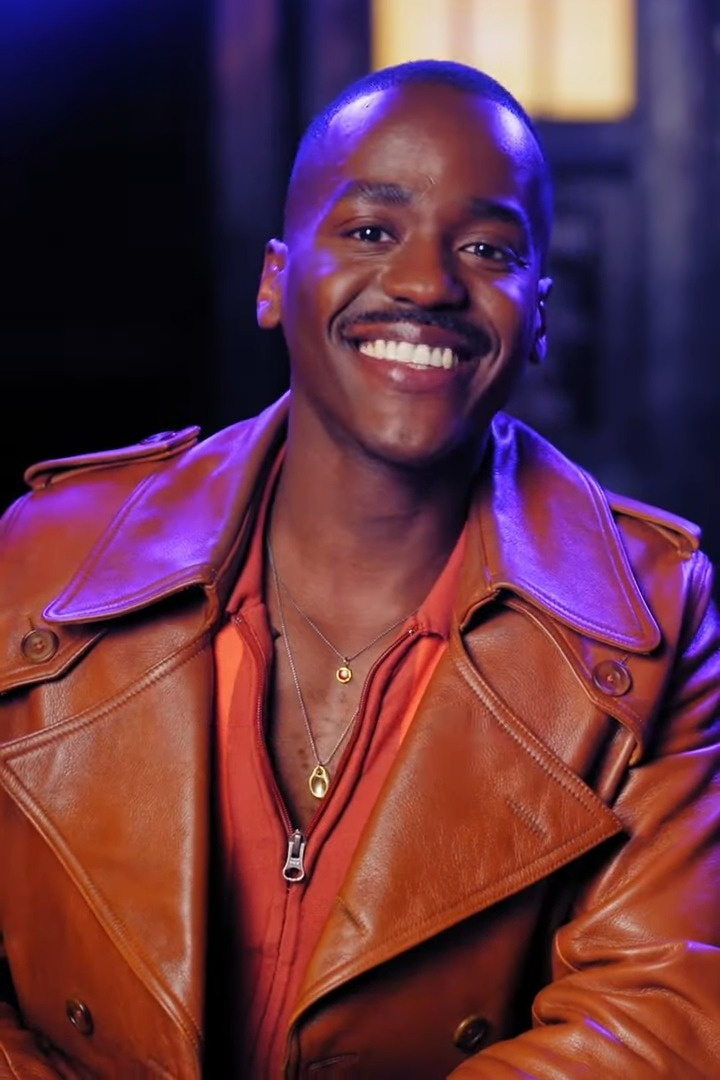
- Ncuti Gatwa as the Fifteenth Doctor
- First regular appearance: "The Church on Ruby Road" (2023)
- Last regular appearance: "The Reality War" (2025)
- Introduced by: Russell T Davies
- Portrayed by: Ncuti Gatwa
- Preceded by: David Tennant (Fourteenth Doctor)

Information
- Tenure: 25 December 2023 – 31 May 2025
- No of series: 2
- Appearances: 16 stories (18 episodes)
- Companions: Ruby Sunday; Joy Almondo; Belinda Chandra
- Chronology: Specials (2023); Series 14 (2024); Series 15 (2025)

The Fifteenth Doctor is an incarnation of the Doctor, the protagonist of the British science fiction television series Doctor Who. Within the series' narrative, the Doctor is a millennia-old alien Time Lord from the planet Gallifrey, with somewhat unknown origins, who travels in time and space in their TARDIS, frequently with companions. Usually, at the end of each incarnation's life, the Doctor regenerates; as a result, both their physical appearance and personality change. However, the Fifteenth Doctor emerged unconventionally, via "bi-generation", in which he split from the body of his predecessor, the Fourteenth Doctor (David Tennant), rather than replacing him, allowing both incarnations to co-exist. The Fifteenth Doctor is portrayed by Ncuti Gatwa, who is the first black man and the first openly queer actor to portray the role. Gatwa portrayed the character in the fourteenth and fifteenth series of the show's 2005 revival.

The Fifteenth Doctor has been characterised as more emotionally open than many previous incarnations. Throughout the Fifteenth Doctor's time on the show, he travels with companions Ruby Sunday (Millie Gibson) and Belinda Chandra (Varada Sethu) while they face off against various antagonists, including a recurring Pantheon of Gods and their leader, Sutekh (Gabriel Woolf), as well as renegade Time Lord the Rani (Anita Dobson and Archie Panjabi) and the banished Time Lord founder Omega (Nicholas Briggs). He also engages in a romantic relationship with the character Rogue (Jonathan Groff), marking the first time in the series the Doctor has engaged in a romantic relationship with another man. After triggering his regeneration to alter reality and bring back a child he had in a fantasy world created by the Rani, the Fifteenth Doctor regenerates into a character portrayed by Billie Piper.

Gatwa was cast in the role after telling his agent that he wanted to play the Doctor. His agent subsequently notified him that the production team of Doctor Who wanted him to audition for the part. He was the last actor auditioned for the role, and was cast soon after. Gatwa was given creative freedom with the Fifteenth Doctor's character, resulting in him researching past stories to decide how he wanted to portray his incarnation. Unlike those of prior incarnations, the character's costumes varied between stories, changing in each one, which was done to not only represent more aspects of British culture, but also so that fans could cosplay any number of looks rather than a particular one.

Gatwa left the role in 2025, with his character regenerating without any prior announcement. Gatwa said his departure was "always the plan", though statements from other actors fuelled beliefs that his departure from the role was not originally planned. Critics praised Gatwa's performance as the character, particularly in scenes from "Rogue" and "Dot and Bubble" (both 2024). However, some critics criticised the character's handling within the show. They felt his introduction hampered his character growth, that his departure was not executed well, and that Gatwa was not given enough time in the role.

== Appearances ==
Doctor Who is a long-running British science-fiction television series that began in 1963. Its main protagonist, The Doctor, is an alien who travels through time and space in a ship known as the TARDIS along with their travelling companions. When the Doctor dies, they undergo a process known as regeneration, completely changing their appearance and personality. Throughout their travels, the Doctor often comes into conflict with various alien species and antagonists.

=== In television ===
Gatwa first appears as the Fifteenth Doctor in the 60th anniversary special episode "The Giggle". He appears in the final third of the story as the Fourteenth Doctor (David Tennant) appears to regenerate but instead "bi-generates", introducing the Fifteenth Doctor as a separate physical entity. The two Doctors team up to defeat the malevolent deity the Toymaker (Neil Patrick Harris), and later use the remaining power of the latter's lingering reality-warping domain to duplicate the TARDIS. After speaking with his predecessor, the Fifteenth Doctor sets off for new adventures in his version of the TARDIS.

The Fifteenth Doctor next appears in "The Church on Ruby Road" (2023) in which he meets new companion Ruby Sunday (Millie Gibson) and faces off against goblins. In the show's fourteenth series, Ruby joins him as his companion, and the two end up travelling through time and space in a variety of adventures. In one episode, "Rogue" (2024), the Doctor begins a romance with the titular time and space travelling bounty hunter (Jonathan Groff), though they are separated during the episode's events. During their travels, Ruby hopes to discover the truth behind what happened to her birth mother. The pair also combat a number of supernatural threats, notably in the form of a Pantheon of Gods, with several of their members attempting to stop the Doctor. The Doctor and Ruby also encounter a mysterious woman's likeness (all played by Susan Twist) repeatedly throughout their travels. This woman is later revealed to be a ploy by Sutekh (Gabriel Woolf), an old enemy of the Doctor and a member of the Pantheon, to destroy all life in the universe, though Sutekh is defeated by the Doctor. Following his defeat, Ruby is reunited with her birth mother and stops travelling with the Doctor.

In series 15, the Doctor is joined by a new companion, Belinda Chandra (Varada Sethu). The series follows the pair as they travel through time and space as the Doctor tries numerous methods to return Belinda to Earth on 24 May 2025. On their final stop, in "The Interstellar Song Contest" (2025), the pair learn Earth was destroyed on 24 May 2025. In "Wish World" (2025), the Rani (played by both Anita Dobson and Archie Panjabi), an old enemy of the Doctor, is revealed to be responsible for the Earth's destruction, locking it in a time loop in an attempt to bring back Time Lord founder Omega (Nicholas Briggs) to revive the Time Lords, who were recently killed in a genocide, under her rule. After Rani and Omega's defeat in "The Reality War" (2025), the Doctor triggers his regeneration in order to subtly alter reality and bring back Poppy (Sienna-Robyn Mavanga-Phipps), who had been his daughter with Belinda in a fantasy world created by the Rani. The Doctor is able to bring Poppy back, but she is now fully human, and no longer the Doctor's child. Leaving Belinda and Poppy behind, he returns to the TARDIS and completes his regeneration, assuming a familiar face (Billie Piper).

=== In spin-off media ===
Prior to the first appearance of the Fifteenth Doctor in "The Giggle", Gatwa made an uncredited cameo as himself, in costume as the Doctor, during an edited repeat of the 2013 dramatised documentary An Adventure in Space and Time, airing on 23 November 2023, Doctor Who's sixtieth anniversary. In the original version, while preparing to film his regeneration scene, William Hartnell (David Bradley) looks across the TARDIS console and sees a vision of Matt Smith, the actor who played the then-incumbent Eleventh Doctor during the show's fiftieth anniversary year. For the 2023 repeat, the scene was edited to replace Smith with Gatwa.

The Fifteenth Doctor, alongside Ruby, appears in comic strips published by Titan Comics, which were first released in 2024 and include the Fifteenth Doctor encountering recurring enemies the Cybermen. Further comics, instead featuring Belinda rather than Ruby, were released by Titan in 2025. The Fifteenth Doctor also appears in comic strips published by Doctor Who Magazine, where in some issues he travels with former companion Mel Bush and fights the Daleks. Audio books starring the Fifteenth Doctor and Ruby were released in 2024, and two further audio books featuring the Doctor alongside Belinda were released in 2025. The Fifteenth Doctor also appears in a Dalek-themed escape room, with Gatwa reprising the role via voiceover instructions.

== Creation and development ==
=== Casting ===
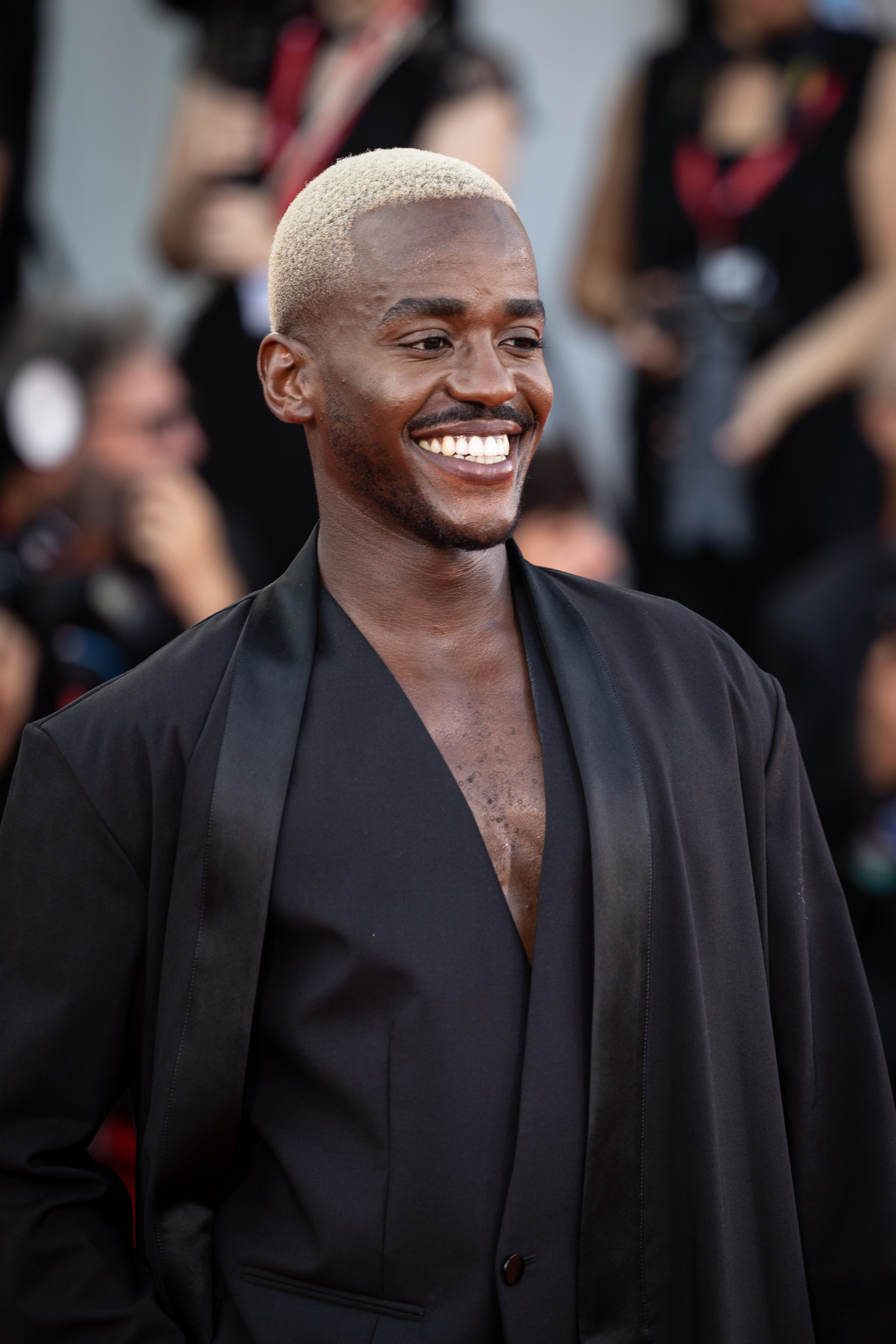
Ncuti Gatwa (pictured in 2024) portrays the Fifteenth Doctor.

Before Gatwa's casting was announced, several actors were rumoured to be taking over from prior lead Jodie Whittaker, including Hugh Grant, Michael Sheen, Michaela Coel, Kris Marshall, Richard Ayoade, Phoebe Waller-Bridge, Kelly Macdonald, and Lenny Henry. Russell T Davies' return as the programme's showrunner also led to speculation that an actor he had previously worked with in other projects would join him as the Fourteenth Doctor, with Olly Alexander, Lydia West, Omari Douglas, and T'Nia Miller ranking highly in betting odds as a result. Rumours also circulated that David Tennant would reprise his role, having previously portrayed the Tenth Doctor during executive producer Russell T Davies's initial time as showrunner.

On 8 May 2022, it was confirmed that Ncuti Gatwa had been cast as the Doctor. Gatwa is the first black actor, first African-born actor, and first openly queer actor to headline as the Doctor. He is also the fourth Scottish actor to play the character. The British Broadcasting Corporation (BBC) prepared for pushback to Gatwa's casting, and put security outside Gatwa's family members' homes; Gatwa later noted that the positive responses to his casting outweighed the negative responses, however.

Gatwa was cast following a request to his agent, after roles in productions such as Sex Education and Barbie, that he would love to play "Willy Wonka or Doctor Who". Gatwa had grown up with the series, and in particular had watched episodes of Tennant's run on the show as it was airing. After his agent notified him that he was asked to audition for the part, Gatwa spent the following week preparing by watching episodes of the programme, primarily from the Ninth Doctor (Christopher Eccleston) and the Tenth Doctor's runs on the show. Davies had auditioned actors of all sexualities and genders for the part. According to Davies, Gatwa was the last actor they auditioned for the part, and he was selected for the part shortly after. Gatwa received the offer via his agent, and after a week's deliberation, accepted the part. Gatwa's casting was stated by the production team to be part of an effort to "push the show forward".

Gatwa was initially announced as Jodie Whittaker's successor as the programme's lead, and many reports stated he would play the Fourteenth Doctor and that Whittaker's Thirteenth Doctor would regenerate into Gatwa's incarnation. At the conclusion of Whittaker's final episode, "The Power of the Doctor" (2022), her Doctor regenerated into an incarnation portrayed by Tennant, who would instead serve as the Fourteenth Doctor. Gatwa was subsequently confirmed as the Fifteenth Doctor, and would take over the role after a series of specials headed by Tennant that aired in 2023 to celebrate the show's 60th anniversary. Gatwa appeared in character for the first time in the trailer for the 2023 specials.

Production of Gatwa's first series was affected by his filming schedule, which conflicted with his work on Sex Education. This resulted in certain episodes, notably "73 Yards" (2024), being affected, with "73 Yards" being filmed as a "Doctor-lite" story, a story in which the Doctor hardly features. The episode largely focused on his companion, Ruby Sunday (Millie Gibson) instead.

=== Characterisation ===
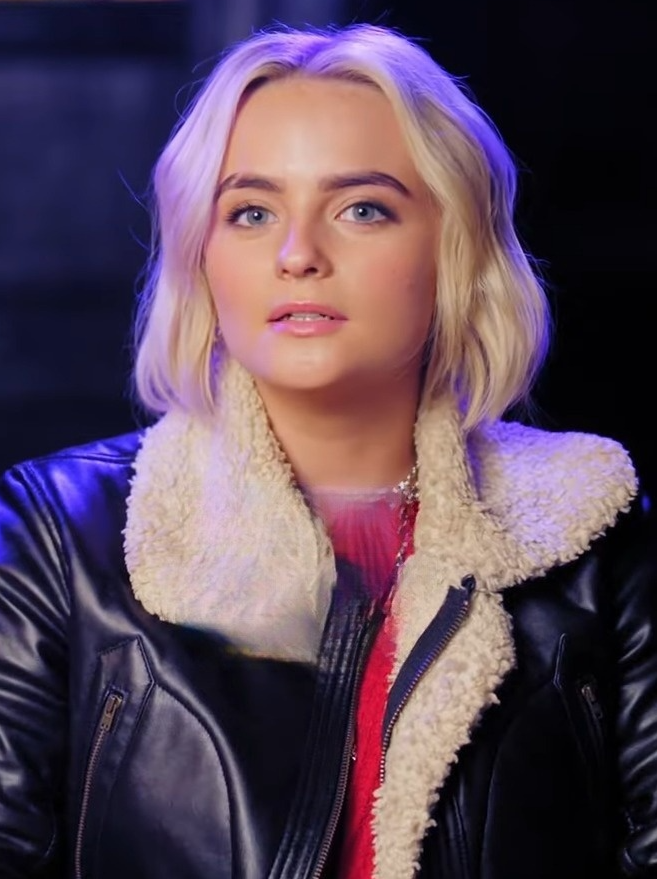
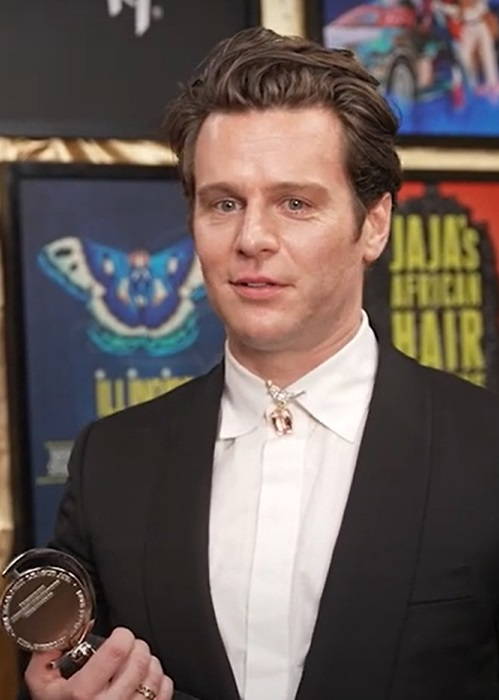
Ruby Sunday (portrayed by Millie Gibson, pictured in costume) and Rogue (portrayed by Jonathan Groff) are two characters with whom the Fifteenth Doctor has major relationships.

The Fifteenth Doctor, unlike his prior incarnations, is emotionally open, and is characterised as friendly and flirtatious. He is initially reluctant to form close relationships, particularly with his companion Ruby Sunday, though ends up forming a strong platonic relationship with her. His relationship with Belinda, conversely, was more antagonistic, with Belinda actively disliking him and not initially trusting him, though they later grow to understand each other and trust each other as their adventures together progress. Despite this incarnation's more outward-facing demeanour, episodes such as "Joy to the World" and "The Interstellar Song Contest" (both 2025) depict darker aspects of the character. Several episodes also focus on the Fifteenth Doctor's status as a black man, with the Doctor facing racism from characters in the episode "Dot and Bubble" (2024) before later finding community with residents of Lagos, Nigeria in "The Story & the Engine" (2025).

According to Davies, he and Gatwa discussed the Fifteenth Doctor's characterisation very little during the development process. Gatwa was allowed a large amount of creative freedom with the role, and he settled into the part gradually as he filmed more for the character. Gatwa, in an interview with The New York Times, said the character had an element of "innocence" due to constantly regenerating and seeing the world with "fresh eyes". Gatwa further characterised his incarnation as being "emotionally available and unavailable...[he's] not afraid to cry, he feels a lot. He's cheeky, he's quite flirty, and unafraid to use his charm to get what he wants." This is in contrast to previous Doctors, who were often more stoic or aloof. In preparation for the role, Gatwa watched old episodes of the series, particularly resonating with Jon Pertwee's Third Doctor and Tennant's Tenth Doctor. He also drew from his family's own personal experiences of conflict in Rwanda, feeling a strong connection to the in-universe narrative of the Doctor being the last of their kind.

Regarding the character's sexuality, Davies stated that "the Doctor is an alien, of course — he's not Ncuti Gatwa, and I think human labels barely apply to him. He loves Ruby with all his heart. He doesn't care what gender people are." The Fifteenth Doctor would end up engaging in a same-sex romantic relationship with the bounty hunter Rogue (Jonathan Groff). Though the character, notably in their Ninth incarnation, had engaged in same-sex kisses before, and had engaged in a same-sex relationship in their Thirteenth incarnation, the romance with Rogue was the first time in the series that the Doctor had engaged in a romantic relationship with a man.

=== Costume ===
In a departure for the character of the Doctor, the Fifteenth Doctor wears a variety of clothing rather than adopting one distinct style. Pam Downe, a costume designer who had previously worked on the 60th anniversary specials, was tasked with designing the Doctor's extensive wardrobe. Downe first drew up numerous mood boards containing different ideas for the costumes, and presented them to Gatwa and the production team; the boards included "all kinds of gender-pushing, societal-pushing outfits". One of them was an image of a "well-known American football player" wearing a "suit skirt", though Downe thought they would have to "wait a bit of time" before introducing that, as it's "such a big jump from former Doctors." Gatwa likened the Doctor to Captain Britain, and wanted "to travel through all the subcultures of Britain" through the Doctor's fashion. Davies said he was familiar with cosplay and wanted cosplayers to have "a great big swimming pool" of costumes to replicate.

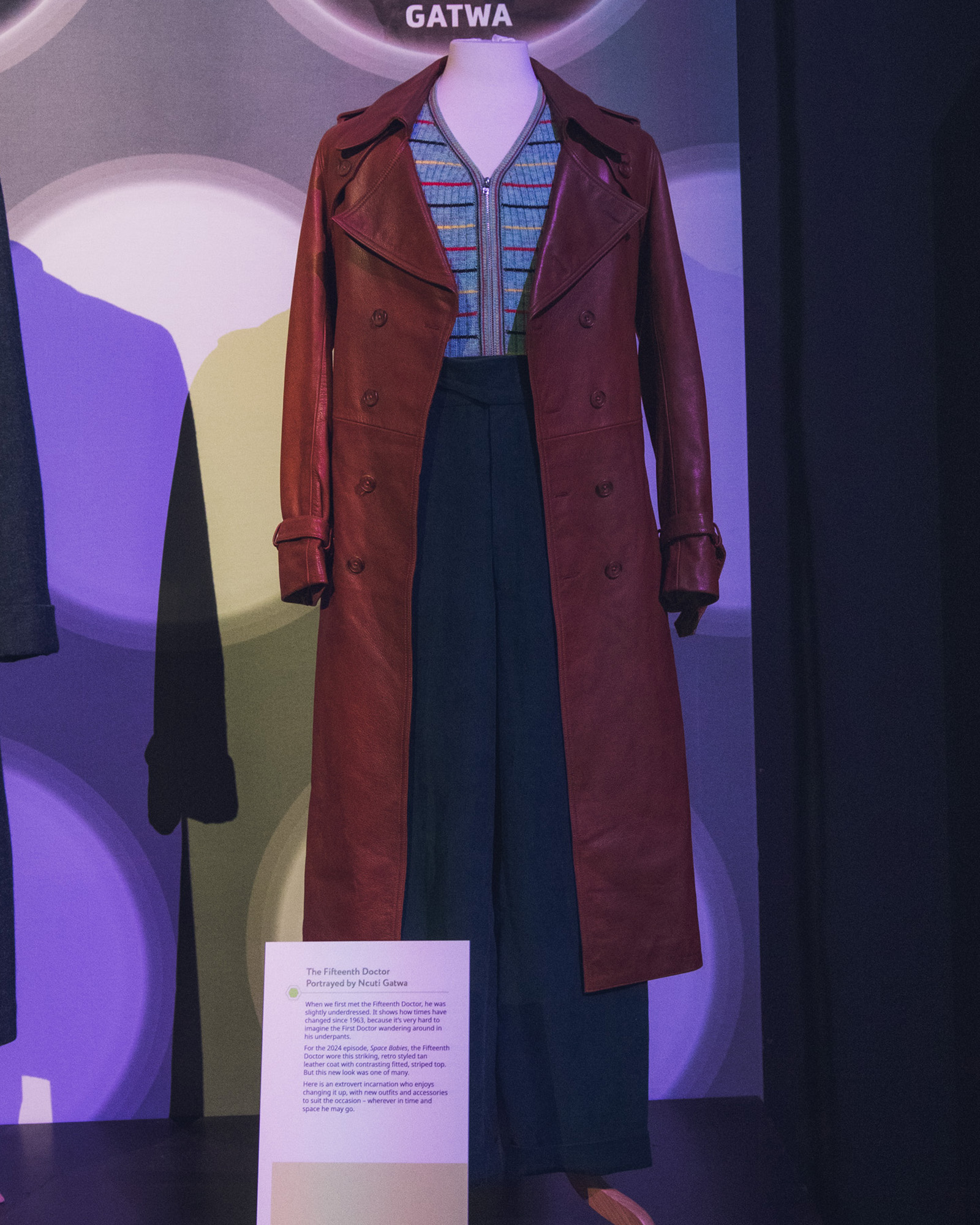
The Fifteenth Doctor's leather trenchcoat outfit as seen on display at an exhibition

Gatwa's initial inclination for the Fifteenth Doctor's style was inspired by Ralph Lauren's "preppy" designs in collaboration with Morehouse College and Spelman College; he noted the colleges' Black histories. The production team opted for less "traditional" looks, wanting to "push it forward". Interviewer Devan Coggan disclosed that the Fifteenth Doctor's costumes were designed to reflect the planet or time period visited in each episode, including a Regency era costume for the episode "Rogue" and a "meticulously tailored pinstripe suit" for the 1960s-set "The Devil's Chord". The Doctor's suit was inspired by images of the Rolling Stones. In the 2023 Christmas special "The Church on Ruby Road", the Doctor wears three different costumes, including a kilt and vest when dancing in a nightclub. Downe said this was a "chance to see how far we could go and it works because he can really wear it." The leather trenchcoat worn by the Doctor in both the special and the first episode "Space Babies" was inspired by "seventies America" mixed with "UK-based eighties ska", with the trousers inspired by Gurkha trousers. The photoshoot for Coggan's interview also revealed two costumes from series 15, described as "an elaborate tartan jacket with a kilt and a stunning all-white look".

Downe also incorporated references to previous Doctors in Gatwa's costumes; Louise Griffin of Radio Times noted that Gatwa's costume for "Rogue" includes a maroon velvet tailcoat reminiscent of the Third Doctor's smoking jackets and blazers. Gatwa expressed an affinity for the style of Pertwee's Doctor, jokingly claiming that "our Doctors are the only two who dress like sluts". Writing in British Vogue, Radhika Seth described the Fifteenth Doctor's early costumes as ranging "from a tangerine-coloured knit and a bright blue double-breasted pinstripe suit, to a glossy leather trenchcoat paired with a cardigan zipped down to expose his chest and a set of delicate gold necklaces, summarising that "Doctor Who is getting sexy". Outfits worn in his second series include a plaid jacket and blue kilt, a blue suit with a salmon-coloured bowtie, and a spacesuit.

Gatwa's incarnation wields a new, flatter design of the sonic screwdriver, a device that the Doctor often uses in their travels. This screwdriver includes writing in Gallifreyan on it, the in-universe language of the Time Lords. The text translates to the Rwandan proverb "the sharpness of the tongue defeats the sharpness of the warrior."

=== Departure ===
In late 2024, Gatwa promised that a third series of his run of Doctor Who was forthcoming while on The Graham Norton Show, and claimed that filming was set to begin in 2025. These comments were reportedly "edited out" at a later date. Previously, Gatwa had also expressed a strong desire to face the Daleks, and stated he would be "angry" if not given the chance. Nevertheless, at the end of "The Reality War", Gatwa's Fifteenth Doctor underwent an unannounced regeneration, regenerating into an unknown character played by Billie Piper, who had previously played companion Rose Tyler. While Gatwa insisted it was "always the plan" for him to only spend a short time playing the lead role because of its "physically and emotionally" demanding aspects, comments he made about returning for a third series gave rise to the belief that he either departed or was let go from the programme for other reasons, such as declining viewership, uncertainty over Doctor Who's future with Disney+, from which the show had been receiving funding, or due to displeasure from BBC executives. In an interview with BBC Breakfast on 13 July 2025, Gatwa again stated that he had chosen to quit his role after two series due to the mental and physical toll it was taking on him, but added that he would not rule out returning to the show in the future.

Afterwards, rumours, originating with television leaker Daniel Richtman, began to spread that an original ending—in which the Fifteenth Doctor celebrated his victory in the finale with his friends while Susan Foreman, the Doctor's granddaughter, looked on—had been scrapped. According to these rumours, the ending was reshot to include the cliffhanger regeneration to Piper's character when it became clear the planned third series would not proceed. This alternate ending was later acknowledged by the mother of child actor Sienna-Robyn Mavanga-Phipps, who played Poppy in the episode, as well as by Carole Ann Ford, Susan's actress, who confirmed she had filmed a scrapped ending scene involving Poppy. At Florida Supercon that August, Piper revealed that she had been approached "very last minute" for her role in "The Reality War", and stated she could not reveal "in what capacity" she was approached.

== Reception ==
=== Announcement and responses ===
Angus Robertson, Scotland's Culture Secretary, congratulated Gatwa on his casting. Actor and singer Olly Alexander, thought to be among the front-runners for the role, tweeted his joy at the casting.

Fellow Scot Sylvester McCoy, who portrayed the Seventh Doctor, tweeted his pleasure over another Scottish actor taking the reins of the Doctor. At the 2022 Paris Fan Festival, Matt Smith, who portrayed the Eleventh Doctor, openly expressed his support for Gatwa taking on the role. In an interview with STV News, Peter Capaldi, who portrayed the Twelfth Doctor, stated that he believed that Gatwa would be "an amazing Doctor." During the 2022 British Academy Television Awards, Gatwa stated that David Tennant, who portrayed the Tenth and Fourteenth Doctors, and Jodie Whittaker, who played the Thirteenth Doctor, both called him to express their support.

A waxwork figure of the Fifteenth Doctor was added to the Madame Tussauds wax museum in July 2024 as part of a Doctor Who-themed set.

=== Critical reception ===
The initial reveal of the Fifteenth Doctor via bi-generation, which allowed Tennant's Fourteenth Doctor to continue living on alongside the new Fifteenth, was seen by critics as taking away from Gatwa's introduction as the first incarnation of the Doctor to be a black man. Charles Pulliam-Moore of The Verge wrote that it gave the appearance of attempting to placate fans who would be upset by Gatwa's incarnation. Joshua Rivera of Polygon similarly stated that while Gatwa's performance in "The Giggle" was strong, he stated that the decision "smacks of cowardice". Pulliam-Moore also wrote that the Fifteenth Doctor's introduction tied him intrinsically to the Fourteenth, making him an instrumental part of the Fourteenth's character development, and as a result it gave Gatwa less time to develop as his own distinct incarnation separate from the Fourteenth.

Following the broadcast of "The Church on Ruby Road", critics responded positively to Gatwa's performance in the episode. Time noted that many early critic responses found him to be a "refreshing, dynamic force that brings the show to new heights". Critics also praised his further performance in the fourteenth series. Naina Bajekal of Time magazine believed that Gatwa was "bringing Doctor Who into a new era". Maya Phillips, writing for The New York Times, stated that Gatwa's Doctor "truly feels like a Doctor for the 21st century", noting the Fifteenth Doctor's emotional openness, which was unique for the character. Sabina Graves, writing for Gizmodo, stated that the Fifteenth Doctor's performance successfully encapsulated the "magic" of the character. The podcast Pop Culture Happy Hour for NPR stated that Gatwa's incarnation of the Doctor felt freed from the emotional baggage of prior incarnations, which allowed the Fifteenth Doctor to feel new and hopeful in a way previous Doctors hadn't been. They positively highlighted Gatwa's performance as the character.

Several critics praised the scene in which the Doctor kisses Rogue because the scene represented the first time an incarnation of the character explicitly engaged in a romantic relationship with a man. Radio Times's Louise Griffin, who wrote that the scene could help viewers feel represented, particularly amid hostility toward gay and LGBTQ+ communities. The scene of the pair kissing received several complaints to the BBC. The BBC stated in response that "As regular viewers of Doctor Who will be aware, the show has, and will always continue to proudly celebrate diversity and reflect the world we live in."

Another scene in "Dot and Bubble", in which members of a racist society reject the Fifteenth Doctor's offer to save them from death due to him being a black man, also received praise from critics, who highlighted Gatwa's performance, the scene's commentary on racism, and its bleak tone within the story. Other critics, however, felt the Doctor was given little agency of his own in this moment because the society's racism was presented as a twist, noting that there was little opportunity for him to properly respond to the events of the story.

Gatwa's time on the show received a mixed response from fans. Some felt the era was less well-written compared to showrunner Russell T Davies's initial run on Doctor Who in the late 2000s. Graves also stated that there was a lack of funding and advertising from Disney, who funded Gatwa's tenure as the Doctor and included his episodes on the streaming service Disney+. Graves argued that Disney had been taking a step back in representation of LGBTQ+ culture due to the political climate of the 2020s, and believed that this removed visibility for the franchise, which she felt was a disappointment due to Gatwa's strong performance in the role.

=== Departure ===
Following Gatwa's departure, The Daily Telegraph's Michael Hogan argued that the era had been unsuccessful, citing Gatwa's lack of recognisability and gravitas, badly written scripts, and what he described as Gatwa's limited commitment to the role. Sarah Carson of i News similarly felt Gatwa's casting was overambitious for "an ascendant star, in huge demand, with limitless potential". Robert Anderson from IGN thought that Gatwa had potential for Doctor Who, possessing "flashes of brilliance", but criticised the shorter series, the writing, and the handling of Gatwa's exit, feeling the actor had been "short-changed". The Guardian's Martin Belam also believed that the shorter length of Gatwa's series in comparison to prior incarnations of the character gave less room for the Fifteenth Doctor's character to grow and develop, and also made weaker stories of his era stand out more than they would otherwise. Belam felt as though Gatwa had not been given enough time in the role.

Amanda-Rae Prescott, writing for Den of Geek, felt that casting Piper, a prominent actor from the show's past, to replace Gatwa in the role could also be interpreted as a concession to racist and homophobic critics of the series. Carlos Morales, writing for IGN, similarly felt that Gatwa's replacement by Piper was like "hitting an emergency button". He argued that rather than pushing the series forward and keeping a focus on Gatwa's incarnation, the show was too focused on attempting to recapture what had worked in the past.

Gatwa later appeared on Saturday Night Live UK in 2026, where he made jokes about his time on the show during his introduction, particularly regarding his episodes' low viewership and uncertainty surrounding the Fifteenth Doctor's regeneration into Piper's character. Following these statements, Gatwa added that he "still love[s] Doctor Who".
