= The Interstellar Song Contest =

318 – "The Interstellar Song Contest"
- Doctor Who episode
- Promotional title-card

Cast
- Doctor: Ncuti Gatwa – Fifteenth Doctor
- Companion: Varada Sethu – Belinda Chandra
- Others: Julie Dray – Sabine; Rylan Clark – Himself; Imogen Kingsley Smith – Runner; Kiruna Stamell – Nina Maxwell; Iona Anderson – Wynn Aura-Kin; Anita Dobson – Mrs Flood; Charlie Condou – Gary Gabbastone; Kadiff Kirwan – Mike Gabbastone; Freddie Fox – Kid; Miriam-Teak Lee – Cora Saint Bavier; Akemnji Ndifornyen – Len Kazah; Christina Rotondo – Liz Lizardine; Graham Norton – Himself; Abdul Sessay – Jeddy Kine; Carole Ann Ford – Susan Foreman; Archie Panjabi – The Rani

Production
- Directed by: Ben A. Williams
- Written by: Juno Dawson
- Produced by: Vicki Delow
- Executive producers: Russell T Davies; Julie Gardner; Jane Tranter; Joel Collins; Phil Collinson
- Music by: Murray Gold
- Series: Series 15
- Running time: 47 minutes
- First broadcast: 17 May 2025

Chronology
← Preceded by "The Story & the Engine"	Followed by → "Wish World"

"The Interstellar Song Contest" is the sixth episode of the fifteenth series of the British science-fiction television series Doctor Who. It was written by Juno Dawson and directed by Ben A. Williams, and released on BBC iPlayer, BBC One, and Disney+ on 17 May 2025, ahead of the final of the Eurovision Song Contest 2025 on BBC One. In the episode, the Fifteenth Doctor (Ncuti Gatwa) and his companion, Belinda Chandra (Varada Sethu), arrive at the Interstellar Song Contest — a futuristic version of the Eurovision Song Contest – where they uncover a plot to kill trillions of people across space headed up by Kid, a member of the Hellion race who seeks to gain revenge for the negative treatment of his species by the Contest's sponsor company.

This was the first Doctor Who television story written by Dawson, who was advised by showrunner Russell T Davies to write a plot around "Die Hard meets Eurovision". Filmed at Wolf Studios Wales in early 2024, the episode utilised over half of the soundstages present on the lot. Several original songs for the programme were created by Dawson, Davies, and composer Murray Gold. The episode received positive reviews from critics, who praised the script, its humour, Gatwa's performance, the political subtext involving the Hellions, and the return of characters Susan Foreman and the Rani. However, there was criticism over the fast pacing, lack of emotional depth, and the weak development of Kid as the story’s villain. The episode was watched by 3.79 million viewers.

== Plot ==
The Doctor and Belinda arrive on a space station that is hosting the Interstellar Song Contest at Harmony Arena. The pair watch the contest while Mrs Flood observes them and collects data from a device, called the Vindicator, which the Doctor uses to return Belinda to Earth. The arena is hijacked by Kid and Wynn, two horned humanoids called Hellions, who deactivate the oxygen dome. This causes the Doctor and most of the spectators to be sucked into space. A few people, including Belinda, remain trapped on the station.

The Doctor has visions of his granddaughter, Susan Foreman, encouraging him to save himself, where he is revived by a nurse, Mike Gabbastone, and his husband Gary, a technician for the arena. The Doctor and the Gabbastones hack into the station's systems. Meanwhile, Belinda and contestant Cora team up to hack into the systems.

The Doctor opens a means of communication with Kid, who tells him he is seeking revenge against the contest's sponsor because they exploited his home planet, Hellia, for a honey flavouring. Cora is revealed to also be a Hellion who hid her forcibly cut-off horns as she would not have been allowed to sing since they are victims of widespread derogatory rumours. Kid plans to use the contest transmission to kill all 3 trillion people watching by transmitting a signal that destroys their brains. The Doctor reaches the station's broadcast room and stops the transmitted signal. He then tortures Kid for wanting to kill everyone until Belinda arrives, stopping him. After Kid and Wynn are arrested, the Doctor recovers the people ejected into space so the Gabbastones could revive them. Cora sings to them all with a song in her language about Hellia, which receives a standing ovation from the audience.

The Doctor and Belinda learn from a hologram that the Earth was destroyed on 24 May 2025, the day they have been unable to return to. Now able to travel to that date at last using the Vindicator, they hear ominous sounds, before an explosion occurs in the TARDIS doors.

In a mid-credits sequence, the Gabbastones also revive Mrs Flood who had experienced a lethal injury in space, where she undergoes bi-generation, becoming two women who reveal themselves to be the Rani. Mrs Flood appears subservient to the new incarnation, and she gives her the data from the Vindicator.

== Production ==
=== Development and music ===
"The Interstellar Song Contest" is the first Doctor Who episode written by Juno Dawson. She is a best-selling author, who had previously authored expanded Doctor Who universe content, including the BBC Sounds' Doctor Who: Redacted podcast (2022–23) and a novel titled The Good Doctor (2018), both featuring the Thirteenth Doctor (Jodie Whittaker). She was additionally among the new writers that had been approached for a prospective second series of the 2016 spin-off show Class, prior to it being cancelled. Dawson was first contacted by Russell T Davies to write for the main series during filming of "The Church on Ruby Road". She initially pitched a disaster plot taking inspiration from The Poseidon Adventure. This was deemed to be too expensive and turned down, so Davies instead instructed her to write "Die Hard meets Eurovision". Davies also contributed to portions of the script, specifically the pieces surrounding the character arcs of Mrs Flood and the Rani. Dawson stated that she first watched Doctor Who with her grandmother when she was ten-years-old, and that writing for the series, which she described as "the best TV show of all time", was a dream come true for her.

External video
- Dugga Doo | Full Song from "The Interstellar Song Contest"

Lyrics for the songs included in the episode were mostly co-written by Dawson and Davies as a collaboration. Davies was the primary lyricist for "My Big Feet" while Dawson took the lead on "I Love You But My Heart Says No!". The lyrics were sent to Murray Gold, who created the tracks for them. Gold also lyricised "Dugga Doo" and Cora's song, altogether composing four original tracks for the episode. The words for Cora's song were translated into English by Dawson. Although "Dugga Doo" only makes a small appearance in the episode, and was purportedly wholly created by Gold himself with no instruction from Davies or Dawson, the song and character quickly gained a cult following. The composition in its entirety was published on the Doctor Who YouTube channel, along with a non-stop livestream of the song looping, which ran for at least one month. "Making Your Mind Up" by British pop group Bucks Fizz was also featured in the episode.

=== Casting ===
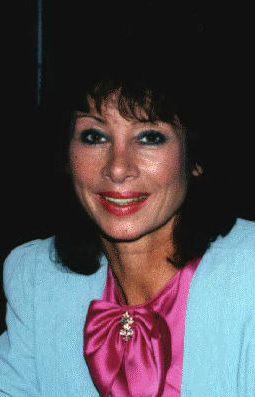
Carole Ann Ford (pictured here in 1986) returned as Susan Foreman for the first time since 1983.

Ncuti Gatwa and Varada Sethu star as the fifteenth incarnation of the Doctor and his companion, Belinda Chandra, respectively. As a tie-in with the theme of the episode, Eurovision commentators Rylan Clark and Graham Norton both appear in the episode as themselves. Dawson's original script did not include Clark, with his role instead being filled by a blue alien named Xylan. A further tie-in had been planned with Gatwa slated to present the votes of the UK jury in the final of the Eurovision Song Contest 2025. However, he was unable to participate and was replaced by Sophie Ellis-Bextor. Freddie Fox appeared as the episode's antagonist, Kid.

Carole Ann Ford made a surprise appearance as Susan Foreman; previously a regular in the series from its inception in 1963 until 1964, Ford reprised her role over 40 years since her last canonical appearance in "The Five Doctors" (1983) and 30 years since her most recent portrayal of the character, in the Children in Need charity special Dimensions in Time (1993). Davies first approached her about returning to the show when they met at the premiere screening for the Doctor Who special episode "The Star Beast" in November 2023. Ford said that she believed the Whovian fandom's relationship with the media industry as being responsible for her return. In order to keep her return a secret, Ford's scenes were filmed on a closed set, and the production staff were required to sign non-disclosure agreements.

Anita Dobson appeared in every episode of the series as the enigmatic Mrs Flood; in this episode, her true identity was revealed to be the Rani, a villainous Time Lord. Archie Panjabi was introduced as a second incarnation of the Rani through a bi-generation process. Christina Rotondo, who was the primary vocalist for "The Goblin Song" (2023), portrayed Liz Lizardine in The Interstellar Song Contest. The remainder of the cast included Charlie Condou and Kadiff Kirwan as Gary and Mike Gabbastone, as well as Julie Dray, Kiruna Stamell, Miriam-Teak Lee, and Akemnji Ndifornyen guest starring as Sabine, Nina Maxwell, Cora Saint Bavier, and Len Kazah, respectively.

=== Production design and filming ===
Many of the alien costumes were reused from previous episodes, but had modifications made to them so that they appeared as new species. To provide a variety in appearances and technical aspects, the production team opted to use a mix of masks and prosthetics. The masks allowed for more elaborate designs and were easier to put on and remove, but were limited in movement; this issue was not mentioned with prosthetics meanwhile, but they took more time to apply. Camera tests for the episode occurred on 6 March 2024 at Wolf Studios Wales. "The Interstellar Song Contest" was directed by Ben A. Williams. It was placed in the fourth production block of the series, along with the preceding episode, "The Story & the Engine". While the same director typically oversees both episodes in a single filming block, the complexity of this story required them to have individual directors.

Over half of the soundstages at Wolf Studios were used for the filming of the episode. The logistics of recording the episode caused the crew to feel like they were producing two distinct programmes. The scenes containing pieces of the singing competition had to be filmed first so that the footage could appear on displays in the production control room set. Some of these were shot up to 10 days prior so that post-production work could take place before using the already-recorded footage. Within the episode, the Harmony Arena has around 100,000 attendees; however, because hiring that many extras was infeasible, only 100 were used. Each extra was scanned digitally, and a "digi-double" of their body was created that allowed them to be duplicated in post-production.

The bigeneration scene was filmed on soundstage 6 on 10 May 2024. By this time, production on "Wish World", an episode in the following block, had commenced. Williams viewed the Doctor Who: Unleashed episode for "The Giggle" (2023) as a reference on how to direct this scene. The same steel support beam was used for both scenes. Also similar to that episode, two versions of the same costume were made for Dobson and Panjabi to wear post-bigeneration.

== Broadcast and reception ==
Professional ratings
Aggregate scores
Source	Rating
Rotten Tomatoes (Tomatometer)	92%
Review scores
Source	Rating
The A.V. Club	A−
Bleeding Cool	9/10
The Daily Telegraph	3/5 stars
Total Film	4/5 stars
IGN	8/10
Vulture	4/5 stars

=== Broadcast ===
"The Interstellar Song Contest" was simultaneously released on BBC iPlayer at 8 a.m. British Summer Time (BST) in the United Kingdom and on Disney+ in the United States at 12 a.m. Pacific Daylight Time on 17 May 2025. A BBC One broadcast of the episode was scheduled for later in the day at 7:10 p.m. BST. Initial uncertainty over the episode's transmission arose because it was scheduled to air after the 2025 FA Cup final, which had the possibility of going into extra time, and before the final of the Eurovision Song Contest 2025, which could not be delayed due to its live broadcast format. Davies said that network executives inquired whether or not he wanted to take the risk of scheduling on that day, to which he responded, "That's the sexiest fucking risk I've ever heard in my life. Let's do it!" It was ultimately televised at the scheduled time. Disney also handled international distribution of the episode.

=== Ratings ===
The episode received overnight figures of 2.57 million, the highest of the fifteenth series at the time of its broadcast. It ranked third on the list of highest-viewed for the day, only falling behind the FA Cup and Eurovision. The episode received a total of 3.79 million consolidated viewers across 7 days, the highest of the 15th series, and a total of 4.27 million consolidated viewers across 28 days.

=== Critical reception ===
On the review aggregator website Rotten Tomatoes, 92% of 12 critics' reviews are positive. Will Salmon, writing for Total Film, praised the episode's script, characters, and humour, though he criticised the Doctor's torturing of Kid, as he felt it was not justified by the episode's plot. Robert Anderson, writing for IGN, praised the episode, highlighting the script, the guest cast, particularly the appearance of Ford, and the political commentary involving the Hellions and its connection to real-world present-day situations; Anderson said that not all of the episode's emotional aspects were successful, however, and believed that Belinda and the Doctor's relationship was "rushed", specifically feeling that the changes in their relationship over time were not properly fleshed out. Martin Belam, writing for The Guardian, highlighted Gatwa's performance, and the relationship between the Doctor and Belinda, believing that it was more realistic than that of the Doctor and Ruby Sunday, but also felt that aspects of the episode would have mixed impact for those unfamiliar with Eurovision.

Stefan Mohamed, writing for Den of Geek, held a negative review of the episode, stating that while the episode's supporting characters and the Doctor and Belinda's relationship were strong, he felt that the re-appearance of Susan was confusing to those not familiar with the series, Kid was not an effective antagonist, and that the episode did not justify the Doctor's actions toward Kid. Newsweek 's Ryan Woodrow felt the episode's pace was too fast to allow for strong emotional scenes, feeling that it made the twist involving Cora, the effectiveness of the Hellions as antagonists, and the Doctor's actions toward Kid feel rushed. Despite this, he highlighted the performance of Gatwa and the return of the Rani. Engadget 's positively highlighted the episode's themes and humour, though criticised the episode for feeling constrained by its length.
