= Belinda Chandra =

Fictional character from Doctor Who

- Doctor Who character
- Varada Sethu as Belinda Chandra
- First appearance: "The Robot Revolution" (2025)
- Last appearance: "The Reality War" (2025)
- Created by: Russell T Davies
- Portrayed by: Varada Sethu
- Duration: 2025

In-universe information
- Full name: Belinda Chandra
- Nickname: Bel
- Species: Human
- Gender: Female
- Occupation: Nurse
- Affiliation: Fifteenth Doctor; UNIT
- Children: Poppy
- Origin: Croydon, London, England
- Home era: 21st century

Belinda Chandra is a fictional character in the British science fiction television series Doctor Who, portrayed by Varada Sethu. The character was created by Doctor Who showrunner Russell T Davies. In the show's fifteenth series, Belinda serves as the companion to the Fifteenth Doctor (Ncuti Gatwa), an incarnation of the alien time traveller known as the Doctor. Debuting in the 2025 episode "The Robot Revolution", Belinda is initially kidnapped by robots from another planet, and after the Doctor saves her, the pair find they cannot return to her home time period on Earth. She travels with the Doctor to use a device called the Vindicator in order to return home. She eventually returns home but is trapped within a heteronormative alternate reality created by the Doctor's enemy The Rani, in which Belinda has had a daughter named Poppy with the Doctor. After Poppy is removed from the timeline alongside the reality, the Doctor restores Poppy to the timeline as Belinda's daughter, and she remains on Earth to care for her.

Sethu had previously portrayed the character Mundy Flynn in the 2024 episode "Boom". Davies was impressed with Sethu's performance and after discussion with the production team, she was offered the role of Belinda without needing to audition. Unlike other companions in the series, Belinda was portrayed as someone who did not want to partake in the Doctor's adventures and wishes to return home, providing friction between the two characters.

Belinda received a positive response for her appearance in her debut episode, "The Robot Revolution", with many critics positively highlighting her unique dynamic with the Doctor. The conclusion of her arc and her role in the season finale, "The Reality War", was criticised by critics, with many feeling that Belinda was "wasted" as a character.

== Appearances ==
Doctor Who is a long-running British science-fiction television series that began in 1963. It stars its protagonist, The Doctor, an alien who travels through time and space in a ship known as the TARDIS, as well as their travelling companions. When the Doctor dies, they can undergo a process known as "regeneration", completely changing the Doctor's appearance and personality. Throughout their travels, the Doctor often comes into conflict with various alien species and antagonists.

Belinda first appears in the 2025 episode "The Robot Revolution". Several years before the episode's events, she received a star diploma from her ex-boyfriend, Alan Budd (Jonny Green). This diploma resulted in a planet orbiting the star to be dubbed "Missbelindachandra One". In May 2025, she works as a nurse and lives in a sharehome. Robots from Missbelindachandra One kidnap her and take her to the planet, dubbing her the Queen of the planet. They attempt to marry her to the "AI Generator", the overlord of the planet, but the Fifteenth Doctor (Ncuti Gatwa) saves her. The pair are recaptured, and it is revealed the Generator is actually Alan, who had been kidnapped by the robots many years prior. Belinda and the Doctor work together to stop Alan, and prepare to leave. The Doctor, remembering her descendant Mundy Flynn, who he worked with in the far future (as seen in the 2024 episode "Boom"), attempts to get her to travel with him, but she rejects him and insists he take her home. The Doctor obliges but cannot return to the time period from which Belinda hailed. In the following episode, "Lux" (2025), the Doctor constructs a device called the Vindicator, which will allow them to return to May 2025 when enough locations across time and space have been visited. The following episodes depict the Doctor and Belinda travelling across the universe to gain enough energy on the Vindicator to return home.

The Vindicator eventually gathers enough energy to return home at the end of "The Interstellar Song Contest" (2025), but the pair wind up trapped in an alternate, heteronormative reality created by the Doctor's enemy The Rani (Archie Panjabi and Anita Dobson). The Doctor and Belinda are reimagined in this reality as a married couple who have an infant daughter named Poppy (Sienna-Robyn Mavanga-Phipps), with no memories of their old lives. The Doctor is eventually able to recover his memories and also restores Belinda's. When he goes to confront the Rani and dispel the altered reality, Belinda is placed inside of a special room alongside Poppy in order to prevent Poppy from being erased when the reality is dispelled. When reality is restored, Poppy is still erased from both of their memories, but after the Doctor is reminded of Poppy's existence by his former companion Ruby Sunday (Millie Gibson) , he causes a regeneration in the time vortex. This results in reality changing to have Belinda be Poppy's mother, but not the Doctor's child. Belinda stays behind to care for Poppy while the Doctor departs to regenerate.

Belinda also appears in a Titan Comics-published comic strip ("The Prison Paradox") and several strips featured in Doctor Who Magazine. She is also the featured companion in two New Series Adventure novels ("Spectral Scream" and "The Moon Cruise") and two audio novels ("Counterstrike" and "Firefall") published by BBC Books. In 2026, she was included in a short story alongside the Fifteenth Doctor in the "Tales of the TARDIS" book, published by Puffin, inspired by the concept from the spinoff anthology series of the same name.

== Creation and development ==
Varada Sethu was announced to be portraying a new companion in Doctor Who's fifteenth series in April 2024, though the character she was playing was not announced prior to the 2024 San Diego Comic-Con, where the character's name was confirmed. Prior to Sethu's appearance as Belinda, she appeared as the character Mundy Flynn in the 2024 episode "Boom"; this episode aired after she had been confirmed as a companion, and her appearance in "Boom" was not confirmed prior to the episode's airing. The relationship between Flynn and Belinda was not established in the episode, leading to speculation of the two characters' relation. Prior to Flynn's appearance, the concept of a companion's actor appearing as different characters prior to the companion's introduction had previously been done with Clara Oswald (Jenna Coleman) in the show's seventh series.

Sethu was contacted to appear as Belinda shortly after portraying Flynn. Though many actors had auditioned for the role of Belinda, showrunner Russell T Davies had greatly enjoyed Sethu's performance in "Boom", and when he pitched the idea of bringing her back, many involved in production quickly agreed, resulting in her not needing to audition for the part. The production team called Sethu in to explain the part, and told her at the end of the meeting that the part was hers, with Sethu quickly agreeing to portray Belinda. Sethu's introduction as a companion makes her pairing with Fifteenth Doctor actor Ncuti Gatwa the first time in Doctor Who history that the main cast of a series was portrayed by an entirely person of colour cast.

Belinda, unlike prior companions, does not wish to travel with the Doctor and instead wants to return to her own life. In an interview with Polygon, Davies explained that Belinda's introduction was intended to "expand the range" of the show, citing that unlike the younger and more optimistic Ruby Sunday (Millie Gibson) who had been the prior season's companion, Belinda had a different approach in that she saw the Doctor as someone "mad" and "dangerous". Sethu also explained that Belinda held the Doctor "accountable", and that she did not "put him on a pedestal", which she believed would make the dynamic feel refreshing for fans of the series. In her debut episode, Belinda criticises the Doctor for testing her DNA without permission, and sees the Doctor's lifestyle as increasingly dangerous and concerning as he tries to convince her to come with him. Sethu said that this different relationship was unique for the fact it provided friction between the Doctor and Belinda, and that, throughout the season, it provided the opportunity for both characters to grow and understand the other for who they are. Ncuti Gatwa, who portrayed the Fifteenth Doctor, stated that the relationship depicted on-screen was emblematic of the relationship he and Sethu had in real life as being equals. The two built a strong off-camera friendship, which according to them bled through into the performance of both characters.

== Reception ==
Following her first appearance in "The Robot Revolution", Belinda was highly praised by critics, with many positively highlighting her dynamic with the Doctor and the potential her character had throughout the season. Sam Moore from Digital Spy believed that Belinda's "grounded" personality allowed her to feel like "a complete person" that echoed strong traits of several past companions in the series, such as Rose Tyler (Billie Piper) and Donna Noble (Catherine Tate). Moore believed that this human touch allowed the audience to relate to and be engaged with her character. Alex Zalban, writing for GamesRadar+, highlighted her introduction as being one of the most surprising in the series, as the scene in which the Doctor and Belinda meet was stated to be "unsettling"; unlike other companion introductions, it provided a flip in the dynamic of the series that made viewers want the Doctor to take her home, instead of take her on adventures like with their other companions. /Film's Michael Boyle similarly opined that this take allowed for a more unique dynamic, as it brought out emotions and relationships not normally seen between the Doctor and their companion. Gizmodo's James Whitbrook highlighted the dynamic the pairing of the Doctor and Belinda had, stating that Belinda's willingness to push back against the Doctor and disagree with him helped to make their relationship compelling with viewers. Whitbrook also highlighted how the pair were allowed to develop their relationship on-screen, unlike with Ruby Sunday (Millie Gibson), the prior season's companion, whose relationship with the Doctor developed off-screen.

The resolution to Belinda's character arc in "The Reality War" led to criticism from critics. Stefen Mohamed, writing for Den of Geek, felt that Belinda had become side-lined as a character in the episode, additionally feeling the episode overshadowed her in favour of focusing on Ruby's arc. Writing for GamesRadar+, Will Salmon felt that Belinda's arc was "fumbled", feeling that its ending made it so her character was defined "by the actions of toxic men". In a later piece for Gizmodo, Whitbrook criticised the usage of Belinda's character by the end of the season, as he believed Belinda's character became more generic and sidelined as the season went on, falling into traditional companion archetypes instead of displaying the traits that had made her stand out in "The Robot Revolution". He further criticised Belinda's characterisation in "The Reality War", believing it to have regressed Belinda's character to solely being a mother caring for Poppy, which Whitbrook believed wasted her character arc. Sethu responded to criticism of the character's departure, opining that "it's a bit unfair because I think the writing was beautiful. I think it was tied up in a way that was perfect, I cannot think of a better way of completing that circle."
