= The Rani =

Character in the TV series Doctor Who

- Doctor Who character
- The Rani, as portrayed by (left to right) O'Mara, Panjabi and Dobson
- First appearance: The Mark of the Rani (1985)
- Portrayed by: Kate O'Mara (1985, 1987, 1993); Anita Dobson (2023–2025); Archie Panjabi (2025)
- Voiced by: Kate O'Mara (2000); Siobhan Redmond (2014–2015, 2026)

In-universe information
- Alias: Mrs Flood (Dobson's incarnation)
- Species: Time Lord
- Home: Gallifrey

The Rani is a fictional character in the British science fiction television series Doctor Who. She is a recurring antagonist within the series. A renegade Time Lord and a nemesis of the series' title character, a Time Lord known as the Doctor, the Rani is an amoral scientist who is willing to do anything to further her research. The Rani was originally portrayed by actress Kate O'Mara, and she appears in the two classic serials The Mark of the Rani (1985) and Time and the Rani (1987), and reprised her role in the charity special Dimensions in Time (1993). The Rani subsequently appeared in spin-off material for the series, being portrayed by actress Siobhan Redmond in some audio dramas, but would not appear on-screen again until the 2005 revival's fourteenth series, where she initially appears as a recurring antagonist named Mrs. Flood, who is portrayed by Anita Dobson. This incarnation of the character "bi-generates", resulting in there being two Ranis, with the second portrayed by Archie Panjabi.

The Rani was initially created due to John Nathan-Turner, a producer on the show, wanting another Time Lord antagonist on the show. The writers of The Mark of the Rani, Pip and Jane Baker, decided to make this antagonist a woman, naming her the Rani after the Sanskrit word for "queen". The Rani would be incorporated into subsequent stories, but would not initially re-appear in the show's eventual 2005 revival. Though planned for a 2013 revival, the character would not re-appear on-screen until 2023's "The Church on Ruby Road," as Mrs. Flood. Russell T Davies enjoyed Dobson in the part and thus brought her back for further appearances. Mrs. Flood was played as a mysterious character, and during filming of series fourteen, showrunner and writer Davies was still unsure of what her true identity should be. He eventually decided on the Rani. The character would have her identity revealed on-screen in 2025's "The Interstellar Song Contest," which introduced Panjabi's incarnation. Davies desired an Indian actress in the part, reflecting the origin of the Rani's name, and contacted Panjabi personally to play her.

The Rani proved to be popular with critics, who praised O'Mara's performance. Many critics highlighted her role as a female antagonist who was treated seriously, which was ground-breaking for the time. She had lasting popularity with fans of the show, resulting in her often being frequently brought up by fans. She additionally was often speculated as a possible identity for mysterious new characters; this happened to such an extent that the production team directly acknowledged that fans would assume these characters to be the Rani. Her eventual return in the show's revival was initially met with a positive response, though her later usage received some criticism from critics.

== Appearances ==
=== Television series ===
Doctor Who is a British science-fiction television series that began in 1963. Its protagonist is the Doctor, an alien who travels through time and space in a ship known as the TARDIS, as well as their travelling companions. When the Doctor dies, they are able to undergo a process known as "regeneration", completely changing their appearance and personality. Throughout their travels, the Doctor often comes into conflict with various alien species and antagonists.

The Rani is a renegade Time Lord and amoral scientist who is willing to do anything to further her research into science and evolution. In her childhood, she attended the Time Lord academy with the Doctor. She was later exiled from Gallifrey, the Time Lords' home planet, for her inhumane experiments. At some point, the Rani came to rule the planet Miasimia Goria.

The Rani (Kate O'Mara) first appears in the 1985 serial The Mark of the Rani, in which she has taken control of a 19th century English mining town during the Industrial Revolution. Her biological experimentation on the enslaved populace of Miasimia Goria has heightened their awareness but inadvertently compromised their ability to sleep, turning them violent and plunging the planet into chaos. To restore order, the Rani has been harvesting the neuro-chemical that promotes sleep from human brains, carrying this out in violent periods of Earth's history so the resulting aggression and sleeplessness go unnoticed. The Sixth Doctor (Colin Baker) is able to stop the Rani's scheme and she is trapped in her TARDIS by a large Tyrannosaurus rex she had previously kept as an embryo.

She next appears in the 1987 serial Time and the Rani. The Rani forces the Doctor's TARDIS to crash on the planet Lakertya, which causes him to regenerate into the Seventh Doctor (Sylvester McCoy). Aided by bat-like alien Tetraps, the Rani has taken control of Lakertya and its peaceful inhabitants. She has created a giant "time brain", using intelligence drawn from geniuses across time and space, which she intends to use to make the calculations necessary to turn Lakertya into a Time Manipulator that would allow her to manipulate evolution on a cosmic scale for her experiments. The Doctor and his companion Mel Bush (Bonnie Langford) are eventually able to thwart the Rani's plans and free the Lakertyans, and the Rani is taken prisoner by the Tetraps, who she had intended to betray. She next appears in the 1993 television special Dimensions in Time, where the Rani attempts to trap the first seven incarnations of the Doctor in a time loop in Walford. Her plan fails when the Seventh Doctor overloads her computer, which sends the Rani, her companion Cyrian (Samuel West), and her TARDIS into a time tunnel.

Throughout the show's 2005 revival's fourteenth and fifteenth series (2024 and 2025), a mysterious woman named Mrs. Flood (Anita Dobson) appears with fourth-wall breaking abilities, including by speaking directly to the show's viewers. Mrs. Flood is eventually revealed to be the Rani in the 2025 episode "The Interstellar Song Contest", and bi-generates, resulting in a second Rani (Archie Panjabi). The two Ranis, in the subsequent episodes "Wish World" (2025) and "The Reality War" (2025), attempt to summon the Time Lord Omega and use his DNA to recreate the Time Lords after they had been previously destroyed. Omega, however, has become a giant, monstrous being, and he eats the second Rani. Mrs. Flood teleports away and is not seen again.

=== Spin-off media ===
The Rani is the villain in Race Against Time, a 1986 Choose Your Own Adventure-style children's gamebook which is part of the Make Your Own Adventure with Doctor Who series. In the story, the Rani attempts to build a device called the Time Destabiliser to recreate the universe. The Rani appears in the 1994 Virgin Missing Adventures spin-off novel State of Change where she finds herself in a distorted pocket reality where the Ancient Egyptians possess 20th-century technology. The Rani tries her hand at political machinations in this reality before the intervention of the Doctor breaks her control and she flees in her TARDIS. The short story "Rescue", written by David Roden and published in the Doctor Who Yearbook 1995, features the Rani rescuing Cyrian and taking him on as a companion before the events of Dimensions in Time. The Rani appears in the 2013 digital short story "Something Borrowed". In this story, she poses as the fiancée of a member of the Koturian race to learn more about the species' unique form of regeneration, but is foiled by the Sixth Doctor and Peri Brown.

The Rani, voiced by O'Mara, is the lead character of the 2000 BBV Productions audio drama The Rani Reaps the Whirlwind, which is set directly following the events of Time and the Rani. Written by Pip and Jane Baker, the story finds the Rani as the prisoner of the Tetraps. Condemned to death, she plots her escape while being forced to use her scientific knowledge to help her captors replenish their dwindling food supply: blood. Another incarnation of the Rani, voiced by Siobhan Redmond, appears in two subsequent audio dramas released in the 2010s. Redmond is set to reprise the role in a series of the War Doctor-focused audio dramas, which will depict the Rani during the events of the Time War and showcase what happened to the character between her appearances on television in the 1980s and the 2020s.

== Conception and development ==
=== Classic era ===
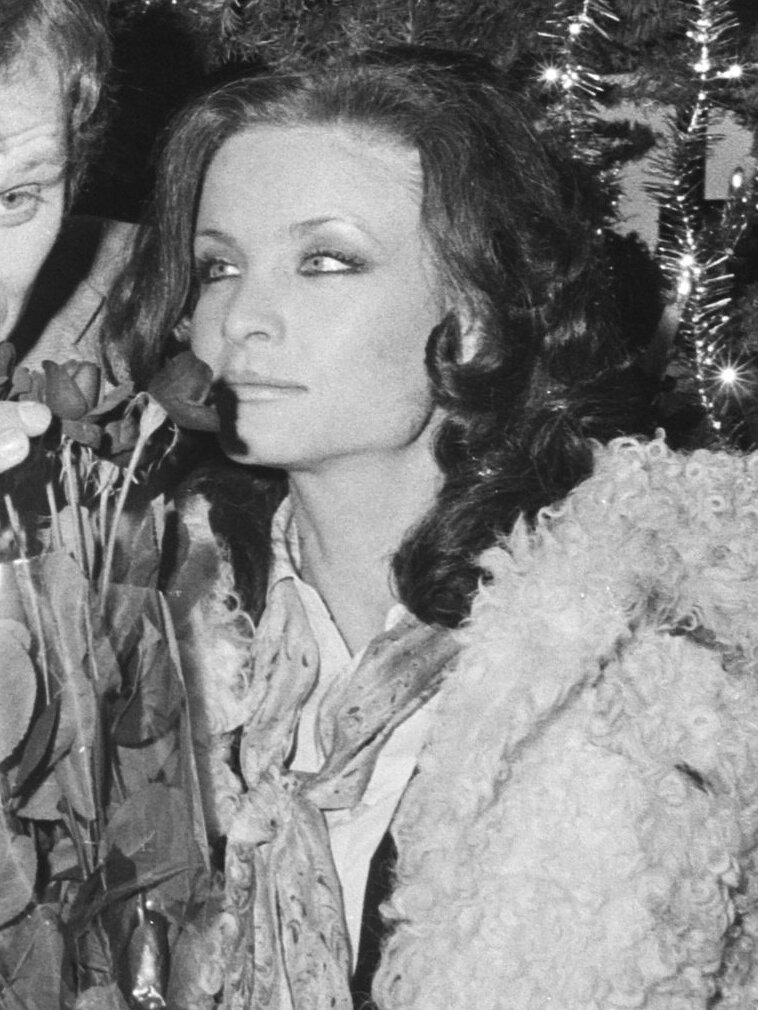
Actress Kate O'Mara (pictured 1976) portrayed the Rani in the character's debut and would reprise the role in later appearances

The Rani, portrayed by Kate O'Mara, first appears in the 1985 classic Doctor Who serial The Mark of the Rani. Producer John Nathan-Turner wanted to bring in a new Time Lord antagonist alongside pre-existing antagonist the Master, with the serial's writers Pip and Jane Baker suggesting the new antagonist be a woman. The Bakers named the Rani after the Hindu word "Rani", meaning queen. The Rani's personality was inspired by a neurochemist friend of the Bakers after a conversation in which the neurochemist discussed with a sentimental friend of theirs about how they only saw humans as a collection of chemicals, while the sentimental friend commented on the exception being the soul; this led to the Bakers characterising the Rani as being a scientist who viewed humanity almost entirely as lab animals.

When cast as the Rani, O'Mara was known as a prolific theatre actress with extensive credits in film and television. She had previously co-starred with the Doctor's portrayer Colin Baker as business adversaries Jane Maxwell and Paul Merroney in the drama series The Brothers from 1975 to 1976. In 2013, O'Mara noted that the Rani had been specifically written for her. O'Mara cited The Mark of the Rani as her favorite episode that she appeared in the series. In her 2003 autobiography Vamp Until Ready, she said that while shooting The Mark of the Rani, she was treated much differently by crew members who did not recognise her while made up as an old woman (a disguise she took on in the serial), versus when she was transformed by flashy wardrobe, hair and her "most glamorous make-up."

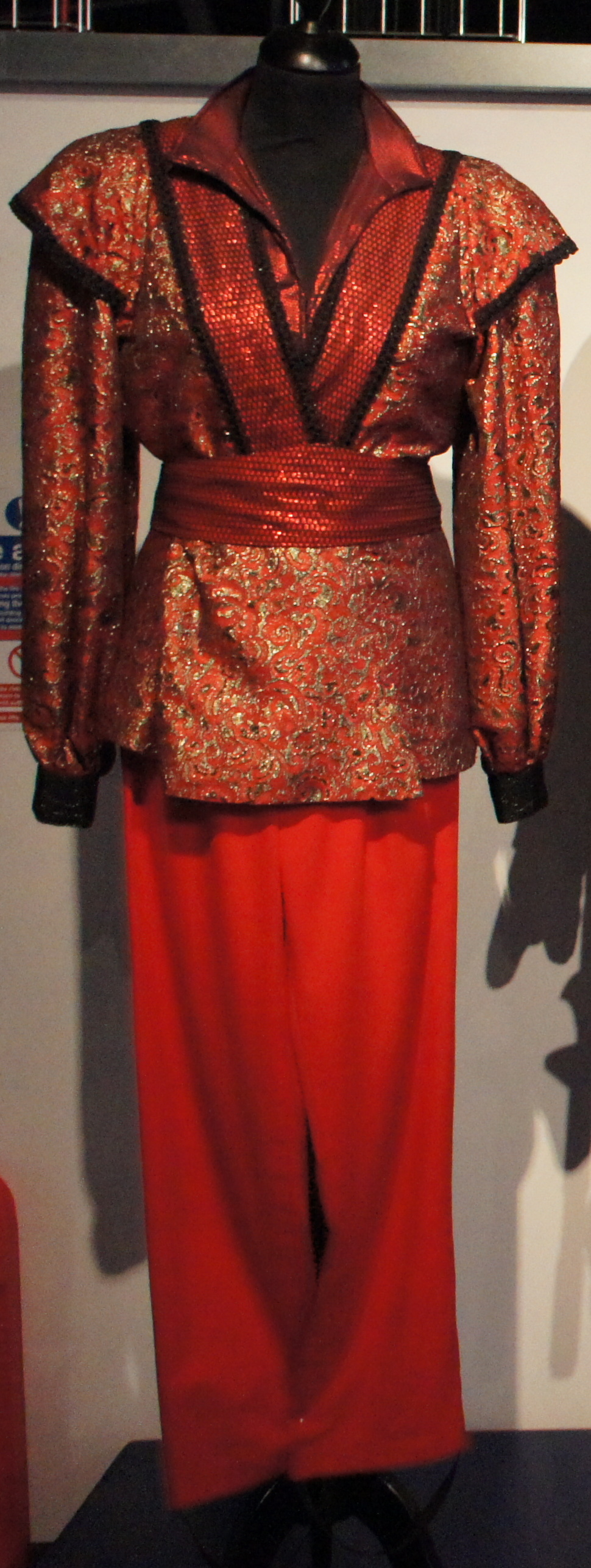
The Rani's costume from Time and the Rani (1987), on display at the Doctor Who Experience in 2015

In late 1984, Nathan-Turner engaged writer Robert Holmes to write a three-part story, later called Yellow Fever and How to Cure It, for season 23 of Doctor Who. The serial was to feature the Rani alongside the Master and the Autons, and would have been shot in Singapore. Once rights to the Rani were secured, all three episodes were commissioned together on 6 February 1985. However on 27 February 1985, BBC One announced that production of Doctor Who would take an extended hiatus, citing a decline in ratings and audiences' growing concerns over violence on television. Holmes completed a story outline and the show would be brought back in 1986, but ultimately Yellow Fever and How to Cure It and other planned serials were set aside in favor of a season-spanning arc called The Trial of a Time Lord.

Nathan-Turner wanted a returning antagonist to tide over the transition between the Sixth and Seventh Doctors, resulting in him electing to bring the Rani back for the 1987 serial Time and the Rani. O'Mara was in America filming the series Dynasty at the time but was able to return to the part. The serial had a section where O'Mara had to imitate Bonnie Langford's character Mel Bush, and as a result had Langford read her lines so O'Mara could properly mimic her.

The original run of Doctor Who went off-air in 1989. Following this, the Rani would appear in Dimensions in Time, a 1993 Doctor Who charity television special written by John Nathan-Turner and David Roden for Children in Need. Though originally planned for the Master to serve as the main antagonist in this special, his actor, Anthony Ainley, did not wish to participate, resulting in Nathan-Turner choosing the Rani to act as the antagonist out of a fondness for the character.

=== Revived era ===
==== 2010s ====
In 2012, then-executive producer and showrunner Steven Moffat stated that he did not wish to bring back the Rani to the series, explaining, "People always ask me, 'Do you want to bring back the Rani?' No one knows who the Rani is. They all know who the Master is, they know Daleks, they probably know who Davros is, but they don't know who the Rani is, so there's no point in bringing her back." In late 2013, O'Mara said she would love to reprise the role, and that her age would be "an idea to be exploited." She explained, “To have a much older woman as your adversary, there's something interesting about that. She's learned so much over the centuries—it would be like in the fairy stories, where it's always the old woman who is the most frightening." Moffat ultimately had planned to bring the Rani back in the 2013 minisode "The Night of the Doctor", where she would've been affiliated with the organization known as the Sisterhood of Karn and would have pushed the Eighth Doctor to regenerate. This appearance was ultimately scrapped due to some members of the production team feeling that this appearance would have wasted the Rani on a smaller production, and though Moffat did not agree, he elected to remove the Rani and replace her with the character Ohila.

O'Mara died in March 2014. At the time of her death, O'Mara was in negotiations with Big Finish Productions to reprise the Rani in a new Doctor Who audio drama. Big Finish producer David Richardson explained that O'Mara contacted them wanting to reprise a role, and stories were quickly drafted for her. O'Mara died a few weeks prior to the planned recording date, leaving the production in disarray until O'Mara's agent contacted them and told them that O'Mara wanted the production to continue with a new incarnation of the character. Scottish actress Siobhan Redmond was subsequently cast as a new incarnation of the Rani, first appearing in the 2014 audio drama The Rani Elite, written by Justin Richards. In this Sixth Doctor audio adventure, the Rani attempts to reverse engineer chaos theory. Redmond's incarnation of the Rani returns in the 2015 audio drama Planet of the Rani, having been imprisoned for 90 years and escaping to seek her revenge against the Doctor.

==== 2020s return ====
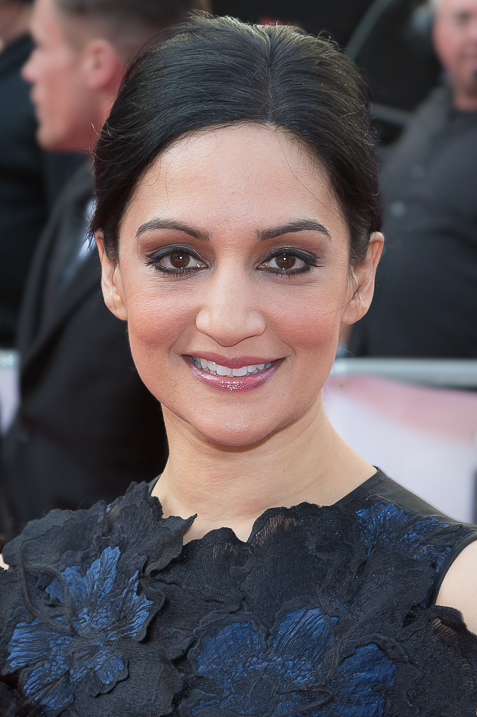
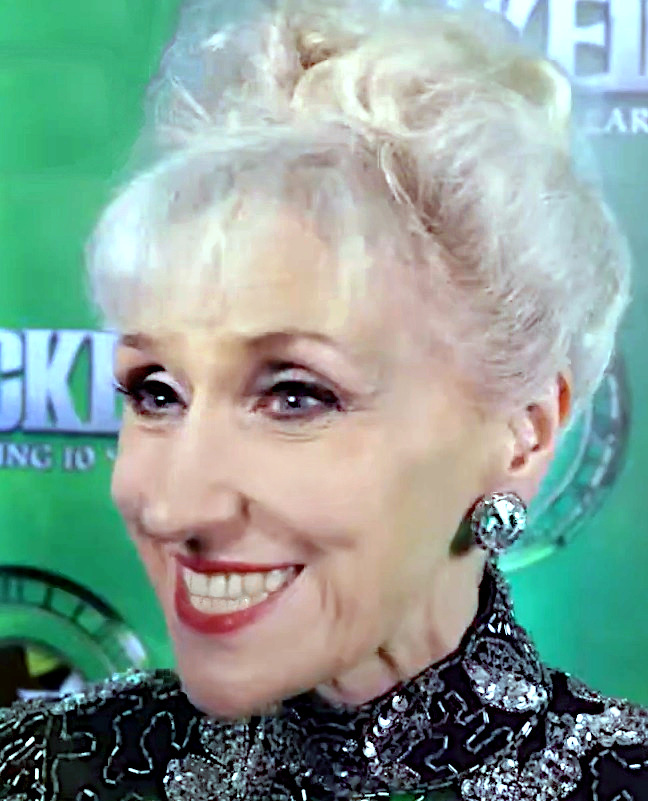
Archie Panjabi (left) and Anita Dobson (right) portray different incarnations of the Rani in the show's 2005 revival

The Rani would not appear on-screen again until Russell T Davies's second tenure as showrunner of Doctor Who. Davies stated in an interview he wanted to bring back the Rani as an antagonist because she was a known villain to fans, citing common speculation over her return, but also that she was obscure enough that those unfamiliar with the character would see her as a new introduction and would not need to worry about her prior history. Davies considered having an original character fulfill her role, but opted to bring her back to encourage viewers to view her previous appearances on BBC iPlayer, where prior Doctor Who episodes can be watched.

Archie Panjabi was cast as the Rani due to several members of the production team having previously worked with her. Panjabi was contacted and accepted the role; she was the only actor contacted to play the character. Davies stated it was "vital" that the production team cast an Indian actress due to the fact that "Rani" was a Sanskrit word. Panjabi was excited to play the part, having grown up watching the series. Panjabi was highly inspired by O'Mara's prior performance, and her costume additionally included visual references to costumes previously worn by O'Mara.

Prior to Panjabi's incarnation's debut, Davies initially introduced the Rani as Mrs. Flood, a mysterious recurring character who took the guise of an old woman. Mrs. Flood was played by Anita Dobson. Initially cast for a guest role in the 2023 episode "The Church on Ruby Road", Davies decided to bring her character back as a recurring character, resulting in Dobson's further appearances. Dobson was initially unaware of who her character would end up being and speculated with her makeup artist on who the character could potentially be. Davies himself was unsure of who exactly Mrs. Flood would be at first, and was split for a while before eventually deciding on who her identity would be. The character would frequently perform fourth wall breaks, which Davies stated "might never be explained". Following the revelation of her identity and Panjabi's casting, Dobson would continue to play the part, with an in-universe phenomenon called "bi-generation" allowing both incarnations to co-exist at once. Mrs. Flood was characterised as being more subservient to Panjabi's incarnation. Panjabi and Dobson got along well on set.

== Reception and analysis ==
Radio Times described the Rani as "the renegade Time Lady who is as evil as the Doctor is good" and the Doctor's "archest of villains." Nur Hussein of SCIFI.radio called the Rani "iconic", writing that "Unlike the power-hungry villain archetype of the Master, the Rani was a ruthless evil scientist who wasn't interested in ruling the universe as much as she wanted to understand it, no matter the cost ... her amoral pursuit of science was an interesting foil for the Doctor." Kate O'Mara's performance as the Rani in both serials she portrayed the character has been praised by critics. James Whitbrook from Gizmodo praised O'Mara's performance as being the peak of the "camp" nature of the show's classic era, which allowed the Rani to live on as a memorable character in the eyes of fans despite her limited amount of appearances.

The book Women in Doctor Who: Damsels, Feminists and Monsters positively highlighted the Rani's presence as a rare female antagonist in the show, which emphasised "the many roles women can have in the Doctor's universe", particularly in contrast to other female Time Lords like Romana, who usually served protagonistic roles. Rhianna Evans from Radio Times opined that despite the Rani's resemblance to pre-existing femme fatale stereotypes, the Rani's presence as a female antagonist that was taken seriously was a ground-breaking character for the time. Literary critic John Kenneth Muir praised this portrayal, highlighting her memorability courtesy of O'Mara's strong performance and her presence as a rare female antagonist taken seriously as reasons for the character's iconicity. However, the book Doctor Who and Science: Essays on Ideas, Identities and Ideologies in the Series found that the show portrayed the Rani with several negative stereotypes regarding women and women in science.

The Doctor Who fandom, prior to her eventual return, frequently requested the return of the Rani, who was considered a popular fan-favorite due to O'Mara's performance. The Rani would become a catch-all guess whenever a mysterious female character was presented, with viewers speculating that characters such as River Song, Missy and others were secretly the Rani. This would end up becoming a recurring joke within the fandom due to how common this point of speculation was. This joke has been acknowledged by members of the production team, who would often acknowledge that the Rani was the first guess for the identity of any potential returning character.

Whitbrook, in another piece for Gizmodo, praised the Rani's reveal in "The Interstellar Song Contest" as being a particularly good twist that fit the "camp" nature of her character, though he believed that Mrs. Flood becoming subservient to Panjabi's incarnation felt odd. Ryan Woodrow of Newsweek also praised the Rani's return, positively highlighting her presence in the episode. However, Evans worried that the Rani's return would detract from her character and make her focus too much on the Doctor, which Evans felt would miss the point of the character's amoral, scientific mindset. Critics for the subsequent episode "Wish World" criticised the usage of her character in the episode, with some finding her in-universe plans to be nonsensical; Robert Anderson from IGN felt she was an example of the episode being too reliant on fan service, while GamesRadar+'s Will Salmon felt her characterisation was similar to that of the Master.
