= Varada Sethu =

Indian-born British actress (born 1992)

- Born: Varada Sethumadhavan; 12 May 1992 (age 34); Kerala, India
- Citizenship: United Kingdom
- Education: Dame Allan's Schools, Newcastle upon Tyne
- Alma mater: University of Bristol
- Occupation: Actor
- Years active: 2010–present

Varada Sethumadhavan (born 12 May 1992), known professionally as Varada Sethu, is an Indian-born British actress. Her most notable credits include playing Detective Sergeant Mishal Ali in Hard Sun (2018), Lance Corporal Manisha Chetri in Strike Back: Vendetta (2020), Cinta Kaz in Andor (2022–2025), and Belinda Chandra in Doctor Who (2025).

Her credits also include Sket (2010), English: An Autumn in London (2012), Doctors (2015), New Blood (2016), Doctor Foster (2017), Hanna (2019), Strike Back: Vendetta (2020), Jurassic World Dominion (2022), and Annika (2023).

== Early life ==
Varada Sethumadhavan was born on 12 May 1992 in Kerala, India. She and her twin sister Abhaya are of Malayali ancestry. Sethu's parents are doctors. She moved to the North East of England at a young age and she grew up in Benton, Tyne and Wear, near Newcastle upon Tyne. Sethu attended Dame Allan's Schools and was a member of the National Youth Theatre. During her final year of sixth form, Sethu won the 2010 Miss Newcastle competition. She went on to study at University of Bristol.

Sethu has been performing the Indian classical dance traditions of both Bharatanatyam and Mohiniyattam from a young age. Sethu continued her acting education at the Identity School of Acting in London.

== Career ==
In 2010, Sethu made her debut appearance on screen in the short film Impressions as Samena. In 2011, Sethu landed the role of Kiran in the feature film Sket, then as Meghana Scariah in English: An Autumn in London in 2012. In 2015 she made an appearance as PC Kylie Green in the 2000 TV series Doctors.

Her career continued in 2016 appearing as Peaseblossom in a 2016 TV movie version of A Midsummer Night's Dream., Now You See Me 2 and New Blood.

In 2017, Sethu appeared as Aisha in two episodes of Doctor Foster. In 2018, Sethu starred as DS Mishal Ali for six episodes in the BBC apocalyptic TV crime series Hard Sun.

In 2019, Sethu performed as a series regular in season seven of Strike Back: Revolution as Lance Corporal Manisha Chetri of the British Army. In 2022, She played rebel Cinta Kaz in both seasons of Andor.

In 2025, Sethu portrayed the companion Belinda Chandra in Doctor Who alongside Ncuti Gatwa as the Fifteenth Doctor in series 15. Prior to this, she played Mundy Flynn in the series 14 episode "Boom".

== Filmography ==
=== Film ===
Year	Title	Role	Notes
2010	Impressions	Sameena	Short film
2011	Sket	Kiran	
2013	English	Meghana Scariah	Indian film
2016	A Midsummer Night's Dream	Peaseblossom	
2016	Now You See Me 2	Tressler Assistant	
2018	Special Delivery	Parminder	Short film
2020	Bad News	Mindi	Short film
2022	Jurassic World Dominion	Shira	
2022	I Came By	Naserine 'Naz' Raheem	
2025	100 Nights of Hero	Esa	

=== Television ===
Year	Title	Role	Notes
2015	Doctors	PC Kylie Green	1 episode
2016	New Blood	Indian Nurse	3 episodes
2017	Doctor Foster	Aisha	2 episodes
2018	Hard Sun	DS Mishal Ali	6 episodes
2019	Strike Back: Revolution	Lance Corporal Manisha Chetri, British Army	10 episodes
2019	Hanna	CIA Analyst McArthur	2 episodes
2020	Strike Back: Vendetta	Lance Corporal Manisha Chetri, British Army	9 episodes
2021-2023	Annika	DS Harper Weston	10 episodes
2022–2025	Andor	Cinta Kaz	10 episodes
2024	Doctor Who	Mundy Flynn	Series 14: "Boom" (guest role)
2025	Doctor Who	Belinda Chandra	Series 15 (main cast); 8 episodes
2026	The Other Bennet Sister	Ann Baxter	3 episodes
