= Director of the Naval Criminal Investigative Service =

Head (civilian) of the Naval Criminal Investigative Service, U.S. Navy

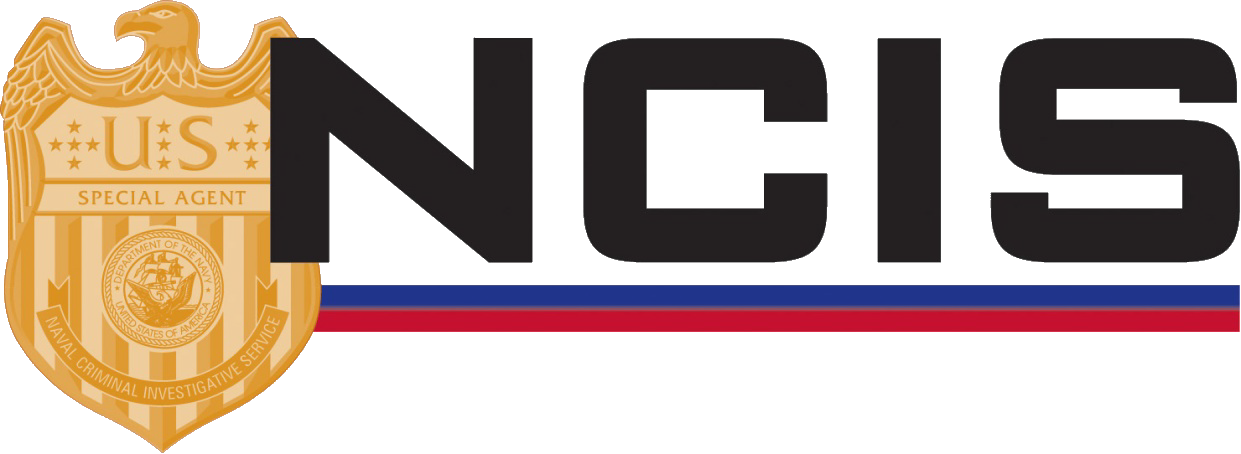

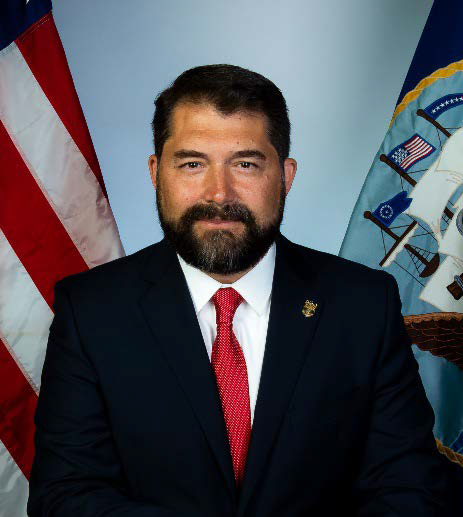
- Incumbent; Omar R. Lopez since June 4, 2019
- Naval Criminal Investigative Service
- Type: Executive director
- Reports to: United States Secretary of the Navy
- Appointer: Secretary of the Navy
- Formation: 1993 (civilian)
- First holder: Roy D. Nedrow
- Website: Official website

The director of the Naval Criminal Investigative Service leads the Naval Criminal Investigative Service (NCIS) agency as it investigates and defeats threats from across the foreign intelligence, terrorist, and criminal spectrum by conducting operations and investigations ashore, afloat, and in cyberspace, to protect and preserve the superiority of Navy and Marine Corps warfighters.

== History ==
In 1993, the NCIS mission was again clarified and became a mostly civilian agency. Roy D. Nedrow, a former United States Secret Service (USSS) executive, was appointed as the first civilian director and the name changed from Naval Investigative Service Command to Naval Criminal Investigative Service (NCIS). NCIS was aligned as an echelon two activity under the Secretary of the Navy, via the General Counsel. Nedrow oversaw the restructuring of NCIS into a Federal law enforcement agency with 14 field offices controlling field operations in 140 locations worldwide.

In May 1997, David L. Brant was appointed director of NCIS by Secretary of the Navy John Howard Dalton. Director Brant retired in December 2005. He was succeeded by Director Thomas A. Betro, who was appointed director of NCIS in January 2006, by Secretary of the Navy Donald C. Winter. Betro retired in September 2009. On September 13, 2009, deputy director of operations Gregory A. Scovel was appointed acting director by Under Secretary of the Navy Robert O. Work. He served concurrently as deputy director for operations until the new director was selected.

On February 14, 2010, Mark D. Clookie became the fourth civilian director of NCIS, having been appointed to the position by Secretary of the Navy Ray Mabus. On October 7, 2013, Andrew L. Traver became the fifth civilian director of NCIS, having been appointed to the position by Secretary of the Navy Ray Mabus. On June 4, 2019, Omar R. Lopez became the sixth civilian director of NCIS, having been appointed to the position by the Secretary of the Navy, Richard V. Spencer.

== List of officeholders ==
No.	Portrait	Name	Term of office			Appointed by	Notes	Ref.
No.	Portrait	Name	Took office	Left office	Time in office	Appointed by	Notes	Ref.
1		Roy D. Nedrow	December 1992	March 1997	4 years, 3 months	Sean O'Keefe	Previously a deputy assistant director of the United States Secret Service	
2		David L. Brant	May 1997	December 2, 2005	8 years, 7 months	John Howard Dalton		
–		Robert C. Thompson acting	December 3, 2005	January 8, 2006	1 month and 6 days	Dionel M. Aviles (Under Secretary of the Navy)	NCIS deputy director for management and administration	
3		Thomas A. Betro	January 9, 2006	September 12, 2009	3 years, 8 months and 3 days	Donald C. Winter	Previously the NCIS Deputy Director for Operations	
–		Gregory A. Scovel acting	September 13, 2009	February 13, 2010	5 months	Robert O. Work (Under Secretary of the Navy)	NCIS deputy director for operations	
4		Mark D. Clookie	February 14, 2010	March 2, 2013	3 years and 16 days	Ray Mabus	Previously the NCIS Executive assistant director of the Combating Terrorism Directorate	
–		Mark D. Ridley acting	March 3, 2013	October 6, 2013	7 months and 3 days	Ray Mabus	NCIS deputy director	
5		Andrew L. Traver	October 7, 2013	June 3, 2019	5 years, 7 months and 27 days	Ray Mabus	Previously the special agent in charge of the Denver, Colorado Field Division of the Bureau of Alcohol, Tobacco, Firearms and Explosives	
6		Omar R. Lopez	June 4, 2019	Incumbent	7 years, 3 months and 3 days	Richard V. Spencer	Previously the NCIS executive assistant director of the National Security Directorate	
