= Omar R. Lopez =

American special agent and attorney

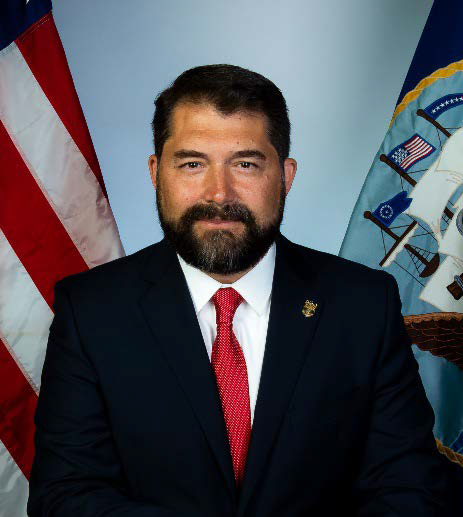
- Lopez in 2019

Director of the Naval Criminal Investigative Service
- Incumbent
- Assumed office June 4, 2019
- President: Donald Trump; Joe Biden; Donald Trump
- Preceded by: Andrew L. Traver

Personal details
- Born: Pico Rivera, California, U.S.
- Education: California State Polytechnic University, Pomona; Loyola Law School

Military service
- Allegiance: United States
- Branch/service: United States Navy
- Unit: Judge Advocate General's Corps

Omar R. Lopez is an American special agent and attorney serving as the sixth civilian director of the Naval Criminal Investigative Service (NCIS) since 2019. He is the first Hispanic American to serve in the role. Lopez was previously the executive assistant director for the NCIS national security directorate.

== Life ==
Lopez is a native of Pico Rivera, California and Hermosa, South Dakota. He earned a Bachelor of Arts degree in political science with honors from California State Polytechnic University, Pomona. He also holds a Juris Doctor degree from Loyola Law School and practiced formerly in California and Washington, D.C.

Lopez was commissioned in the United States Navy Judge Advocate General's Corps as a judge-advocate in 1995. He served in active duty and reserve assignments with U.S. Naval Special Warfare Command, U.S. Pacific Command, and the U.S. Court of Appeals for the Armed Forces. Lopez served as a trial counsel and special Assistant U.S. Attorney in California. Following active duty, he worked for a law firm in Washington D.C., specializing in litigation and energy regulation.

In 2003, Lopez began his career with Naval Criminal Investigative Service (NCIS) as a special agent, assigned to the Port Hueneme Resident Agency in California. He worked across NCIS mission areas, including criminal drug operations, national security operations, and protective service operations, with special assignments to Federal, state, and local task forces, including deployment with the Coalition Provisional Authority – Iraq. Lopez served in leadership positions at NCIS Headquarters and field offices, both domestically and overseas. He was the executive assistant director for the NCIS national security directorate. Lopez exercised program management and oversight over global counterterrorism and counterintelligence investigations and operations, including espionage, terrorism, compromise, technology transfer, cyber operations, threats to research, development, and acquisition programs; force protection activities, and insider threat programs. In May 2019, he was awarded the silver medal of meritorious service by the Hispanic American Police Command Officers Association. On June 4, 2019, Lopez was sworn in by the United States secretary of the Navy, Richard V. Spencer, as the sixth civilian director of NCIS. He succeeded Andrew L. Traver. Lopez is the first Hispanic NCIS director.

== Trivia ==
Lopez made a cameo appearance in the season finale of the 17th season of NCIS, portraying a special agent.

== See also ==
- Hispanics in the United States Navy
