= The Retrievals =

Podcast by Serial Productions

- Genre: Investigative journalism; Serialized audio narrative
- Language: English

Cast and voices
- Hosted by: Susan Burton

Music
- Theme music composed by: Carla Pallone

Production
- Production: Susan Burton; Laura Starecheski
- Editing: Laura Starecheski; Julie Snyder
- Length: 3h 51m

Technical specifications
- Audio format: Podcast (via streaming or downloadable MP3)

Publication
- No. of seasons: 2
- No. of episodes: 9
- Original release: June 22, 2023

Related
- Website: Link to NYT Podcast

The Retrievals is a podcast by Serial Productions and The New York Times and hosted by Susan Burton.

== History ==
The podcast is produced by Serial Productions and The New York Times. The show debuted on June 29, 2023. The podcast is a five episode show hosted by Susan Burton. The podcast focuses on how female patients are treated in contemporary medicine. A nurse at the Yale Reproductive Endocrinology and Infertility Clinic was switching out fentanyl-based painkillers for saline. The nurse had switched out 175 vials. The show interviews Laura Czar who underwent a procedure where she was given the saline instead of the painkillers. The show includes interviews with dozens of women who were impacted.

Season 2, of The Retrievals, subtitled The C-Sections, was released on July 10, 2025. This season focused on women who were not listened to when they said they were in pain during cesarean delivery. Episode 1 interviews Clara, a labor and delivery nurse in Chicago who experienced traumatizing pain while giving birth in her own workplace, and Mindy, her co-worker, who was present at the time. Episode 2 follows Dr Heather Nixon, obstetric anesthesiology division head, responding to the incident. The episode follows Dr Nixon delivering a speech at The Society for Obstetric Anesthesia and Perinatology annual conference with clinicians in the audience responding to questions raised in the presentation. Episode 3 interviews Susanna Stanford, a patient in England who experienced intraoperative pain and campaigned to raise awareness of anesthetic failure, co-authored the UK Obstetric Anaesthetists' Association guidelines for the prevention and management of intraoperative pain during Caesarean delivery and advocated a shift in research methodology to include patient reported outcomes. Episode 4 returns to Chicago with Dr Heather Nixon, Mindy and Clara, describing efforts to improve care.

== Content ==
The first two episodes of Season 2 are available on traditional podcast distributors. The third and fourth episodes were available for New York Times subscribers only. The first episode was released as an episode of This American Life.

== Reception ==
The series was named the best podcast of 2023 by Nicholas Quah at Vulture and Eliana Dockterman at Time Magazine.

=== Awards ===
Season	Award	Date	Category	Result	Ref.
Season 1	Peabody Awards	2023	Podcast & Radio	Won	

== Television adaptation ==
In May 2026, Netflix ordered a series adaptation, with Molly Smith Metzler serving as writer, showrunner and executive producer alongside Colin McKenna, Susan Burton and Caitlin Roper. In July 2026, it was announced that Lila Neugebauer would direct the pilot and executive produce the series. In the same month, Andrij Parekh revealed that he would serve as the cinematographer of the first episode and the director of two episodes of the series. The cast is led by Emilia Jones, Amy Ryan, Jessica Chastain, Fabien Frankel, Will Harrison, Arian Moayed, Story Walker, Adepero Oduye, and Liam Oh.
