= Boots (TV series) =

American military comedy drama television series

- Promotional poster
- Genre: Military; Comedy drama
- Created by: Andy Parker
- Based on: The Pink Marine by Greg Cope White
- Starring: Miles Heizer; Ana Ayora; Blake Burt; Cedrick Cooper; Dominic Goodman; Nicholas Logan; Kieron Moore; Angus O'Brien; Liam Oh; Rico Paris; Max Parker; Vera Farmiga
- Country of origin: United States
- Original language: English
- No. of seasons: 1
- No. of episodes: 8

Production
- Executive producers: Norman Lear; Andy Parker; Rachel Davidson; Jennifer Cecil; Brent Miller; Peter Hoar; Scott Hornbacher
- Running time: 40–50 minutes
- Production companies: Act III Productions; A House on Brame; Minty Goodness; Blue Encounter; Sony Pictures Television

Original release
- Network: Netflix
- Release: October 9, 2025

Boots is an American military comedy drama television series created by Andy Parker, based on the memoir The Pink Marine by Greg Cope White. The series follows Miles Heizer as Cameron Cope, a closeted gay teenager from Louisiana who enlists in the United States Marine Corps alongside his best friend Ray McAffey (Liam Oh). Set in 1990, when the military excluded gay people from service, the story depicts their boot camp training under Sergeant Sullivan (Max Parker), a drill instructor who takes special interest in Cope. The series also stars Ana Ayora, Blake Burt, Cedrick Cooper, Dominic Goodman, Nicholas Logan, Kieron Moore, Angus O'Brien, Rico Paris, and Vera Farmiga.

The series premiered on Netflix on October 9, 2025, and received positive reviews from critics, but received backlash from conservatives and The Pentagon under the Trump administration. Some also claimed that its portrayal of military life at the time it was set was an oversimplification. In addition, rather than being a resident of Louisiana who enlisted in 1990, Greg Cope White was actually a resident of Texas, with The Pink Marine also being set in 1979. It was canceled after one season on December 12, 2025.

Like Boots, a 1996 episode of JAG which had a similar title, "Boot," had also discussed potential unethical treatment at the Marine Corps Recruit Depot Parris Island, with one scene even suggesting potential violation of the "Don't Ask, Don't Tell" policy after one of the star characters was asked about her sexuality while serving undercover as a recruit at Parris Island.

== Premise ==
In 1990, Cameron Cope, a closeted gay American teenager, impulsively follows his best friend Ray McAffey into the United States Marine Corps.

== Cast ==
=== Main ===
- Miles Heizer as Cameron Cope
- Ana Ayora as Captain Denise Farjardo
- Blake Burt as John Bowman
- Cedrick Cooper as Staff Sergeant Marcus McKinnon
- Dominic Goodman as Isaiah Nash
- Nicholas Logan as Sergeant Cary Wayne Howitt
- Kieron Moore as Nicholas Slovacek
- Brandon Tyler Moore as Cody Bowman
- Angus O'Brien as Thaddeus Beau Sterling Hicks
- Liam Oh as Raymond McAffey
- Rico Paris as Santos Santos
- Max Parker as Sergeant Liam Robert Sullivan
- Vera Farmiga as Barbara Cope

=== Recurring ===
- Johnathan Nieves as Eduardo Ochoa
- Troy Leigh-Anne Johnson as Alice

=== Guest ===
- Landon Ashworth as Coach Roach
- Zach Roerig as Sergeant Knox
- Anthony Marble as Harlan McAffey
- Joy Osmanski as Ji-Yeong/June McAffey
- Logan Gould as Mo Mason
- Jack Cameron Kay as Joshua Jones
- Brett Dalton as Sergeant Pitowski
- Beau Mirchoff as Rob Maitra
- Sachin Bhatt as Major Aaron Wilkinson

== Episodes ==
No.	Title	Directed by	Written by	Original release date
1	"The Pink Marine"	Peter Hoar	Andy Parker	October 9, 2025
Set in the summer of 1990, Cameron Cope is a closeted high school graduate living in New Orleans who is regularly bullied at school or ignored by his family at home. Seeking purpose in his life, Cameron meets with his only friend, Ray, after the latter returns home from the Air Force Academy due to poor eyesight to enlist in the United States Marine Corps. Despite his initial reluctance to enlist with Ray due to the law against homosexuals in the military, Cameron is ultimately convinced to sign up to make a change in his life and the lack of other options. Upon arriving at Parris Island, Cameron initially finds boot camp to be overwhelming but is convinced by Ray to stick it out. Ray is subject to racist harassment by drill instructor Sergeant Knox which escalates to Knox violently assaulting Ray which furthers Cameron's distress. Meanwhile, Cameron's neglectful con artist mother Barbara remains unaware of her son's whereabouts until she recalls Cameron saying goodbye before heading to boot camp and receiving a message from him on her answering machine. Believing that Cameron has been manipulated into enlisting, Barbara confronts the Marine recruiter who talked to Cameron but is assured that Cameron will be fine. Ray later returns from the infirmary and assures Cameron that Knox will be replaced.
2	"The Buddy System"	Phil Abraham	Jonathan Caren	October 9, 2025
Cameron and Ray face tougher challenges under the command of Sergeant Sullivan, a new drill instructor and Recon veteran from Guam who quickly establishes strict authority. The recruits undergo intense physical training, where twin brothers Cody and John Bowman struggle with growing tension rooted in childhood abuse. Cody was punished by their father whenever John gained weight, leaving lasting resentment. Ray successfully urges Cameron to fight him for combat drills but go too easy on each other, prompting Sullivan to pressure Ray into striking Cameron harder. After Ray wins the match under the conditions of Sullivan's pressures, Cameron feels betrayed, and their friendship begins to fracture further when Sullivan secretly warns Ray to distance himself from him. Cameron is later appointed platoon scribe and assigned to manage fire duty shifts, but after being bullied into covering for Nicholas Slovacek, he snaps and retaliates, sparking a fight that results in collective punishment. Meanwhile, Sergeant Howitt ropes the twin brothers together to force cooperation during training. During the obstacle course, Cameron successfully completes the challenge, while John collapses and is injured, prompting rare trepidation from Cody. Deeming John's injury as Ray's failure, Sullivan strips him of his squad leader title and promotes Cameron, deepening the rift between the two friends.
3	"The Confidence Course"	Phil Abraham	Andrea Ciannavei	October 9, 2025
A storm forces the recruits inside, where they are forced to engage in mind games and rigorous indoor training. Sullivan receives a surprise from his past. Still coping with Cameron being gone, Barbara begins to seek comfort in a Marine mom support group.
4	"Sink or Swim"	Silas Howard	Greg Cope White	October 9, 2025
During an intense swim training, Ray suffers a setback, which forces Cameron to dive in with a risky scheme to keep him above water. Meanwhile, Sergeant Sullivan's time in Guam begins to catch up with him.
5	"Bullseye"	Silas Howard	Megan Ferrell Burke	October 9, 2025
While the recruits undergo competitive rifle training, an unexpected tragedy hits the platoon. NCIS investigation into Sergeant Sullivan begins to intensify.
6	"The Things We Carry"	Kyle Patrick Alvarez	Nick Jones Jr.	October 9, 2025
As news of Ochoa's death spreads around base, Cameron and the rest of the recruits try to grapple with his death. A miscommunication causes a major incident in the Mess Hall. Capt. Fajardo confides in Sergeant McKinnon. Cameron receives a new bunkmate, Jones, a transfer from a different platoon.
7	"Love Is a Battlefield"	Tanya Hamilton	Dominic Colon	October 9, 2025
An intense combat training filled with manipulation, mind games and secrets pushes the platoon to its breaking point. Cameron begins to grow close with Jones. Meanwhile, recovering from alcohol poisoning, Ray begins to build a bond with a girl. Sullivan begins to unravel.
8	"The Crucible"	Kyle Patrick Alvarez	Andrea Ciannavei & Andy Parker	October 9, 2025
As the end of Boot Camp is around the corner, the recruits face a final test like no other that has them relying on brotherhood to make it past the finish line. John and Cody receive terrible news. Cameron learns a surprising family secret that could jeopardize everything he worked for. Sullivan makes a life-altering decision.

== Production ==
=== Development ===
Boots is produced by Sony Pictures Television and Act III Productions, and is based on the 2016 memoir The Pink Marine by Greg Cope White, who is also a writer on the series and an executive producer. It received a series order from Netflix in May 2023, and entered pre-production on June 7 of that year. The series is created by Andy Parker, who adapted the book and serves as showrunner and executive producer, with Jennifer Cecil as executive producer and co-showrunner. Norman Lear and Brent Miller of Act III also executive produce, alongside Rachel Davidson and Scott Hornbacher. Peter Hoar executive produces and directs the first episode.

=== Casting ===
The main cast includes Vera Farmiga, Miles Heizer, Max Parker, Liam Oh, Ana Ayora, Blake Burt, Kieron Moore, Dominic Goodman, Angus O'Brien and Rico Paris, with many of the cast optioned for a possible second season in August 2025. Additional cast of the series includes Brandon Tyler Moore, Zach Roerig, Anthony Marble, Joy Osmanski, Ivan Hoey Jr., Logan Gould, Jack Kay, Troy Leigh-Anne Johnson, Johnathan Nieves and Brett Dalton.

=== Filming ===
Production of the first season began in the summer of 2023 but was halted after one week due to the 2023 SAG-AFTRA strike. Filming resumed in March 2024 and wrapped in August 2024.

== Release ==
The series was released on Netflix on October 9, 2025.

== Reception ==
=== Critical response ===
The review aggregator website Rotten Tomatoes reported a 90% approval rating based on 40 critic reviews. The website's critical consensus states, "Miles Heizer's terrific performance has the right stuff in Boots, a likable dramedy that explores masculinity and queerness to powerful effect". Metacritic, which uses a weighted average, gave a score of 73 out of 100 based on 21 critics, indicating "generally favorable" reviews.

Writing for USA Today, Kelly Lawler calls the show "a sweet and funny new dramedy" and "the hidden gem TV show of the year." She goes on to write: "made of heart and soul, a military dramedy that eschews tired boot-camp tropes and wooden, stereotypical characters for a cast of complex and misunderstood individuals."

Nandini Balial for RogerEbert.com was critical of the show, saying the "flaws in 'Boots' arise from two very different creative decisions." Balial goes on to say that the show is "an oversimplification of what military life was and is actually like for queer service members, despite the creators' best intentions."

US Defense Secretary Pete Hegseth was openly critical of the series, one of his spokespersons branding it "woke garbage". Following the remarks, the series doubled in viewership.

=== Accolades ===
Awards and nominations received by Boots
Award	Year	Category	Nominee(s)	Result	Ref.
GLAAD Media Awards	2026	Outstanding New TV Series	Boots	Nominated	
Queerties Awards	2026	TV Comedy	Boots	Won	
Queerties Awards	2026	TV Performance	Miles Heizer — Boots	Nominated	
Dorian TV Awards	2026	Best Unsung TV Show	Boots	Won	
