= Max Parker (actor) =

English actor (born 1992)

- Born: Maxwell Nathaniel J. Brown; 7 February 1992 (age 34); Bolton, England
- Occupation: Actor
- Years active: 2013–present
- Spouse: Kris Mochrie (m. 2025)

Maxwell Nathaniel J. Brown (born 7 February 1992), known professionally as Max Parker, is an English actor. He is best known for his roles as Sergeant Sullivan in the Netflix military series Boots (2025), Mikhail Tanner in the Peacock fantasy horror series Vampire Academy (2022), and Luke Posner in the ITV soap opera Emmerdale (2019–2021).

== Early life and education ==
Parker was born Maxwell Nathaniel J. Brown on 7 February 1992 in Bolton, Greater Manchester, England, to parents Susan and Stephen. He has one sister and four half-siblings.

Parker attended the Arts Educational Schools in London, graduating in 2013.

== Career ==
Parker made his stage debut as part of the ensemble cast of Barnum. In 2014 he appeared in the musical I Can't Sing! The X Factor Musical and began appearing in Matilda the Musical until 2015. In 2016 Parker portrayed Paul in Kiss Me, Kate, and starred as the Tin Man in The Wizard of Oz, which earned him a nomination for Best Supporting Performance at the UK Theatre Awards. The same year, he made his acting debut as Christopher Morgan in the feature film My B.F.F.

In August 2018, Parker began appearing in the BBC One medical drama Casualty as Alasdair "Base" Newman on a recurring basis. He made his final appearance in January 2019 when his character died of a heroin overdose. He then appeared as Danny in an episode of World on Fire. In August 2019, Parker joined the cast of the ITV soap opera Emmerdale as Luke Posner, the son and brother of established characters Wendy Posner (Susan Cookson) and Lee Posner (Kris Mochrie). He had originally auditioned for the role of Jamie Tate, which ultimately went to Alexander Lincoln. He made his departure from the soap in June 2021.

In 2020 Parker appeared in two episodes of COBRA as John Cripps and played Alex in the film Love Sarah. In 2022 he starred as Mikhail Tanner in the Peacock fantasy horror series Vampire Academy and portrayed Henry Tudor in the Netflix series Blood, Sex & Royalty. Parker acted alongside Miles Heizer in the Netflix series Boots which premiered on 9 October 2025. In March 2025, it was announced that Parker had been cast in the fifteenth series of Doctor Who.

In January 2026, he was cast as the Norse god Heimdall in the upcoming Amazon Prime Video live-action adaptation of the two Norse mythology-based video games in the God of War series.

== Personal life ==
Parker came out as gay in a December 2020 interview with Attitude magazine, confirming he was in a relationship with Emmerdale co-star Kris Mochrie. They announced their engagement in January 2022. Parker and Mochrie married in August 2025.

== Filmography ==
Year	Title	Role	Notes	Ref.
2016	My B.F.F.	Christopher Morgan	Film	
2018–2019	Casualty	Alasdair "Base" Newman	Recurring role, 7 episodes	
2019	World on Fire	Danny	1 episode	
2019–2021	Emmerdale	Luke Posner	Regular role, 84 episodes	
2020	COBRA	John Cripps	2 episodes	
2020	Love Sarah	Alex	Film	
2022	Vampire Academy	Mikhail Tanner	Main role	
2022	Blood, Sex & Royalty	Henry VIII	Main role	
2024	Strictly Confidential	Will	Film	
2025	Doctor Who	Manny	Episode: "The Robot Revolution"	
2025	Boots	Sergeant Liam Robert "Bobby" Sullivan	Main role	
TBA	God of War †	Heimdall	Supporting role	

== Stage ==
Year	Title	Role	Venue	Ref.
2013	Barnum	Amos Scudder / Edgar Templeton	Chichester Festival Theatre	
2014–2015	Matilda the Musical	Rudolpho	Cambridge Theatre	
2016	Guys and Dolls	Sky Masterson	Savoy Theatre	
2016	Kiss Me, Kate	Paul	Welsh National Opera	
2018	The Wizard of Oz	Tin Man	Sheffield Crucible Theatre	
