= The Christmas House =

- Written by: Erin Rodman; Robert Buckley
- Directed by: Michael Grossman
- Starring: Robert Buckley; Ana Ayora; Treat Williams; Sharon Lawrence; Jonathan Bennett; Brad Harder; Mattia Castrillo
- Music by: Mikel Hurwitz
- Country of origin: United States
- Original language: English

Production
- Producer: Charles Cooper
- Cinematography: William McKnight
- Editor: Saeed Vahidi

Original release
- Network: Hallmark Channel
- Release: November 22, 2020

The Christmas House is a made-for-television film produced for the Hallmark Channel. A Christmas-themed comedy-drama, it was directed by Michael Grossman. It features an ensemble cast, including Sharon Lawrence and Treat Williams as a wife and husband who invite their two adult sons (played by Robert Buckley and Jonathan Bennett) to come back home for Christmas and recreate a past family tradition. It premiered on November 22, 2020.

The Christmas House was the first Hallmark movie to prominently feature a same-sex couple.

== Plot ==
Bill (Treat Williams) and Phylis (Sharon Lawrence) have been married for many years. They invite their two adult sons, Mike (Robert Buckley) and Brandon (Jonathan Bennett) to stay with them for the two weeks leading up to Christmas, to revisit an old family tradition. They will transform the family house into "the Christmas house", with the entire home, inside and out, extensively decorated for Christmas. Mike is an actor who stars in the television series Handsome Justice. Brandon is a baker, married to Jake (Brad Harder) who also comes to visit. Meanwhile, Mike's high school friend and former neighbor Andi (Ana Ayora) has moved back to town with her son Noah (Mattia Castrillo) following a divorce.

The family members each have issues that they are dealing with, that initially they do not tell each other about. Bill and Phylis have decided to sell the family house. Mike's TV show has not been renewed by the network. Brandon and Jake want to adopt a child, but their efforts have been unsuccessful. Despite these problems, the family members work together to revive their former holiday tradition.

== Cast ==
- Robert Buckley as Mike Mitchell, an actor, Bill and Phylis's son and Brandon's brother
- Ana Ayora as Andi Cruz, Mike's friend and neighbor from their high school days
- Treat Williams as Bill Mitchell, Phylis's husband and Mike and Brandon's father
- Sharon Lawrence as Phylis Mitchell, Bill's wife and Mike and Brandon's mother
- Jonathan Bennett as Brandon Mitchell, a baker, Bill and Phylis's son and Mike's brother
- Brad Harder as Jake, Brandon's husband
- Mattia Castrillo as Noah Cruz, Andi's son
- Gabriela Reynoso as Elena Cruz, Andi's mother
- Michelle Harrison as Kathleen, the showrunner of Handsome Justice
- Chris Gauthier as Marvelous Jim, the owner of the magic store

== Social context ==
The Christmas House was the first Hallmark Channel film to prominently feature a same-sex couple. In the movie, Brandon and Jake's relationship is fully accepted by their relatives and friends. The fact that they are gay is not discussed in the film, and they are shown as part of the extended family. In one scene, after a private discussion about their efforts to adopt a child, the two men share a romantic kiss.

Wedding Every Weekend was the first Hallmark Channel movie to include a same-sex couple, though they were not part of the main story line. In that film – a romantic comedy that premiered on August 15, 2020, three months before The Christmas House – a man and a woman go to four weddings in four weeks. One of the weddings they attend is a marriage of two women.

In December 2019, some months prior to the broadcast of these films, the Hallmark Channel aired some commercials for Zola, a wedding services company. Some of the ads showed two brides kissing at their same-sex wedding. After complaints from One Million Moms, an organization that is part of the American Family Association, Hallmark stopped showing the commercials, only to face a backlash from supporters of LGBTQ rights. Hallmark reversed its decision and issued an apology, saying that the company was "committed to diversity and inclusion – both in our workplace as well as the products and experiences we create."

== Sequel ==
A sequel titled The Christmas House 2: Deck Those Halls premiered on December 18, 2021.

== Awards ==
The Christmas House was nominated for the 2021 GLAAD Media Award for Outstanding TV Movie. The sequel The Christmas House 2: Deck Those Halls was likewise nominated for the 2022 GLAAD awards in the same category
