= Thomas A. Betro =

American NCIS director

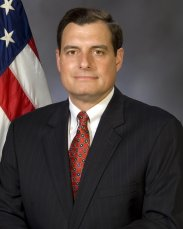
- Betro in 2008

Director of the Naval Criminal Investigative Service
- In office January 9, 2006 – September 12, 2009
- Preceded by: David Brant
- Succeeded by: Mark D. Clookie

Military service
- Allegiance: United States
- Branch/service: United States Navy

Thomas A. Betro (born 1959 in Walpole, Massachusetts) is the former director of Naval Criminal Investigative Service in Quantico, Virginia.

Betro earned a bachelor's degree in government from Colby College and a master's degree from the Naval War College in Newport, R.I. At the Naval War College, he was awarded the James Forrestal Award for "Excellence in Strategy and Force Planning."

He began his career with NCIS as a special agent in 1982. In 2001 he left NCIS to work as a Deputy to the National Counterintelligence Executive. He was then made National Counterintelligence Executive. In January 2003 he returned to NCIS as an assistant director of Counterintelligence. In August 2003, he was promoted to deputy director for Operations, where he served until being made director of NCIS after former director David L. Brant retired in December 2005. He was appointed by Navy Secretary Donald C. Winter in 2005 and commissioned on January 8, 2006. He is the third civilian Director of NCIS. He is in the Senior Executive Service.

With NCIS, Betro served as the Special Agent Afloat aboard the USS John F. Kennedy as well as the USS Enterprise.

In 2007, Betro was awarded the Presidential Rank Award of Meritorious Executive. In 2008, Betro was awarded the Roger W. Jones Award for Executive Leadership.

In September 2009, Betro stepped down as the director of NCIS.

In Oct 2010, Betro was named vice president of 3i-MIND's Global Law Enforcement practice.
