= Department of the Navy Central Adjudication Facility =

U.S. armed forces information security organization

- Active: 1986–2013
- Country: United States of America
- Branch: United States Navy
- Part of: Naval Criminal Investigative Service

Commanders
- Director: R. B. Peele

The Department of the Navy Central Adjudication Facility (DoN CAF), a Naval Criminal Investigative Service (NCIS) organization, was responsible for determining who within the Department of the Navy is eligible to hold a security clearance, to have access to Sensitive Compartmented Information (SCI), or to be assigned to sensitive duties. The aggregate body of DoN personnel consists of Active Duty and Reserve components of the United States Navy and Marine Corps, as well as civilians and contractors. In addition, DoN CAF makes SCI eligibility determinations for select contractor personnel. Collateral clearance determinations for contractor personnel are established by DISCO (Defense Industrial Service Clearance Office).

DoN CAF also maintained an extensive database of its security decisions and provides overall operational support to the Navy's personnel security program.

Adjudication is the review and consideration of all available information to ensure an individual's loyalty, reliability, and trustworthiness are such that entrusting an individual with national security information or assigning an individual to sensitive duties is clearly in the best interest of national security. Their mission is to provide customer service, adjudication, and implement strategies for the DoN Personnel Security Program.

In January 2013, the DoN CAF was consolidated, along with the other Central Adjudications Facilities within DoD, into a single organization, known as the DoD CAF, per the direction of the Deputy Secretary of Defense. The DoD CAF is currently the sole authority to determine security clearance eligibility of non-Intelligence Agency DoD personnel occupying sensitive positions and/or requiring access to classified material including Sensitive Compartmented Information.
