= Peter Garza =

- Born: August 6, 1960 (age 66)
- Education: Claremont Graduate University (M.S.)
- Occupations: Computer forensics expert, cybercrime investigator
- Employer: Data Forté
- Known for: Conducting the first court-ordered Internet wiretap in the U.S.

Peter Garza (born August 6, 1960) is a United States computer forensics expert and cybercrime investigator.

As a Special Agent with the Naval Criminal Investigative Service, he conducted the first court-ordered Internet wiretap in the United States, leading to the conviction of hacker Julio Cesar Ardita. Garza later founded EvidentData, Inc., which was acquired by First Advantage, and then established Data Forté in 2009. He has played a pivotal role in several high-profile civil cases, including a $934 million jury award in Beckman Coulter Inc. v. Dovatron International Inc. and a $45 million jury award in Steinberg, Moorad & Dunn, Inc. v. Dunn. Garza holds a Master of Science in Information Systems from Claremont Graduate University and has taught computer forensics at California State Polytechnic University, Pomona.

== Career ==
As a Special Agent with the Naval Criminal Investigative Service, Peter Garza conducted the first court-ordered Internet wiretap in the United States while investigating the Julio Cesar Ardita ("El Griton") hacking case. Ardita was charged by the U.S. Justice Department with using compromised user accounts at Harvard University to hack into government and university computer systems in the U.S. and abroad. Ardita pleaded guilty on May 19, 1998 in the United States District Court of Massachusetts to unlawfully intercepting electronic communications and damaging files on military computer systems.

Garza founded EvidentData, a private sector investigative firm specializing in computer forensics. EvidentData was acquired by First Advantage which he left in 2009 to form Data Forté. Garza continues to be involved in many high-profile civil cases. He gave expert testimony regarding altered electronic documents in a case (Beckman Coulter Inc. v. Dovatron International Inc.) which resulted in a $934 million jury award and testified regarding critical deleted but recoverable data in a case (Steinberg, Moorad & Dunn, Inc. v. Dunn) brought by sports agent Leigh Steinberg against former partner David Dunn which resulted in a $45 million jury award.

Peter Garza earned a Master of Science in Information Systems from Claremont Graduate University in 2001. He also developed and taught a graduate course in Computer Forensics at California State Polytechnic University, Pomona.
