= Ana Ayora =

American actress

- Occupation: Actress
- Years active: 2008−present

Ana Ayora is an American actress best known for her role as Nuria Soto in the 2013 film The Big Wedding and as Deputy Nina Cruz in the Cinemax original series Banshee. She also appeared in the 2019 film Captain Marvel.

== Biography ==
Ayora learned ballet at a young age, but by 20, she had to give it up due to a ligament injury. By that time, she turned her attention to acting. Regarding her transition, Ayora said, "The next thing I knew, I was booking commercials. That's [when] I realized I liked being in front of the camera acting rather than other modeling."

Despite having been a fan of films like Annie at a young age, Ayora never saw herself initially as an actress. "I must say that while growing up I was not a big fan of cinema or television... I was very social, and I spent more time outside the house than lying in an armchair in front of a screen. But now I'm here, in this job; you see how fate ends up marking your path in one way or another." Her career took off when she landed small roles in projects such as Marley & Me and Castle.

She would continue to work day and night jobs at American Apparel and a club called Touch, the former of which she would leave during lunchtime to audition for roles. Ayora eventually landed the role of Nuria Soto in the 2013 film The Big Wedding, which became her breakout role. Ayora lacked a traditional Latina accent and had to perform with one for the film. She joined the cast of Captain Marvel, which is part of the successful Marvel Cinematic Universe franchise.

== Filmography ==
Film roles
| Year | Title | Role |
|---|---|---|
| 2008 | Marley & Me | Viviana |
| 2011 | Phoenix Falling | Katie Martinez |
| 2013 | The Big Wedding | Nuria Soto |
| 2014 | Redeemed | Julia |
| 2016 | Ride Along 2 | Server |
| 2017 | Chronologia Human | Ana |
| 2019 | Captain Marvel | Agent Whitcher |

Television roles
| Year | Title | Role | Notes |
|---|---|---|---|
| 2009 | Lincoln Heights | Ana | 2 episodes |
| 2009 | Castle | Young Woman | Episode: "One Man's Treasure" |
| 2010 | Savage County | Izzy | TV movie |
| 2013 | Meddling Mom | Yolanda Vega | TV movie |
| 2013, 2016 | Banshee | Nina Cruz | Guest role (season 1); recurring role (season 4) |
| 2014 | Chop Shop | Sofia | Main cast |
| 2017 | Major Crimes | Sofia Luna | 2 episodes |
| 2018 | MacGyver | Kamila | Episode: "Wind + Water" |
| 2019, 2021–2022 | In the Dark | Detective Sarah Barnes | Recurring role (seasons 1, 3–4) |
| 2020 | The Christmas House | Andi | TV movie |
| 2021 | The Christmas House 2: Deck Those Halls | Andi | TV movie |
| 2023 | Truth Be Told | Alicia | 4 episodes |
| 2025 | Boots | Capt. Denise Fajardo | Main role |
