= Chop Shop (web series) =

American action drama web series

- Genre: Action; Drama
- Created by: John Bregar; Marshall Johnson
- Written by: John Bregar; Marshall Johnson
- Directed by: Elliott Lester
- Starring: Luis Moncada; John Bregar; Ana Ayora; Rene Moran
- Composer: Mark D. Todd
- Country of origin: United States
- Original language: English
- No. of episodes: 6

Production
- Executive producers: Marshall Johnson; Elliott Lester; Josh Baizer; Josh Weinstock; Suzanne Hargrove; Max Leitman
- Producer: Robert Keyghobad
- Editor: Nicholas Wayman-Harris
- Running time: 21–22 minutes
- Production companies: Bandito Brothers; Insurge Pictures

Original release
- Network: Machinima
- Release: July 18 – August 23, 2014

Chop Shop is an American action drama web series created by Josh Baizer & Marshall Johnson and produced by Bandito Brothers and Insurge Pictures, it aired on Machinima.

== Synopsis ==
Set in the underground auto-theft world of Los Angeles, the series follows car thief Porter after a five-year prison stint as he tries to go straight and reconnect with his family while clashing with old associates and rivals.
