= David Brant =

US Navy officer

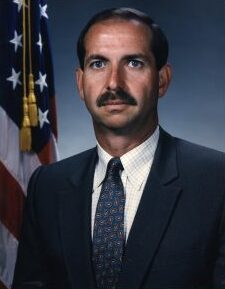
- Brant as Director of the Naval Criminal Investigative Service

Director of the Naval Criminal Investigative Service
- Incumbent
- Assumed office May 1, 1997
- Preceded by: Roy D. Nedrow
- Succeeded by: Thomas A. Betro

Personal details
- Occupation: NCIS special agent

Military service
- Allegiance: United States
- Branch/service: United States Navy

Dave Brant is a retired career Naval Criminal Investigative Service (NCIS) special agent and executive. He served in the NCIS from 1977 to 2005, leading the agency as its director from 1997 until his retirement in December 2005.

== Background and education ==
Brant received his undergraduate education at Bradley University and a master's degree from Indiana State University. During his time at NCIS, he graduated from the Senior Executive Course at the John F. Kennedy School of Government at Harvard University.

Before joining NCIS, Brant was a police officer with the Miami-Dade Police Department.

== Career in law enforcement ==
Brant spent thirty years working in law enforcement, 28 of them at the NCIS, the last 8 years as its director.

Senator John Warner, who was himself a former Secretary of the Navy, read a tribute to Brant into the Senate record, when Brant retired.

=== Accusations of torture at Guantanamo ===
A twenty-page statement issued on July 7, 2004, describes a series of high-level meetings among the United States Department of the Navy's most senior lawyers, that were triggered by reports, from Brant, that the captives being held in the Guantanamo Bay Naval Base were being subjected to questionable interrogation techniques.

Alberto J. Mora's statement contained several quotations from Brant, about Brant's reluctance for the NCIS to be involved with the questionable interrogation techniques:

"Director Brant emphasized that NCIS would not engage in abusive treatment even if ordered to and did not wish to be even indirectly associated with a facility that engaged in such practices."

In 2011 Brant provided a video testimonial in which he voiced his respect for Mora, his immediate superior, for the principled stand he took as soon as Brant told him about the abuse of the individuals being held in Guantanamo. Brant said Mora didn't seem to even hesitate over whether he should a principled stand to his own superiors. Brant explicitly said he realized that Mora was putting his job on the line with his stand.

== Television appearance ==
David Brant made a brief cameo appearance on the CBS drama NCIS playing a Special Agent of the same name in the episode "Frame Up" in Season 3. This episode aired on November 22, 2005 one month before his retirement. He is asked by the character Leroy Jethro Gibbs (Mark Harmon) "I heard you were quitting" to which Brant responds "I like to refer to it as a lateral move into the recreational sector...Jethro" to which Gibbs explains to Mossad liaison officer Ziva David (Cote de Pablo) that it "...mostly means fishing and hitting a golf ball".

== Post law-enforcement career ==
After he left NCIS Brant worked as a security expert for the accounting firms Deloitte Consulting and BDO. While at those firms he was a dedicated fund-raiser for the National Law Officers Memorial Fund.

He would eventually leave consulting to become the executive director of the National Law Enforcement Museum.
