= Kris Mochrie =

English actor (born 1984)

- Born: Kristopher Ian Mochrie; 24 October 1984 (age 41); Birkenhead, Merseyside, England
- Education: Manchester School of Acting
- Occupation: Actor
- Years active: 2002–present
- Spouse: Max Parker (m. 2025)

Kristopher Ian Mochrie (born 24 October 1984) is an English actor. He is known for portraying the roles of Lee Posner in the ITV soap opera Emmerdale, Jez in the BBC drama series Ordinary Lies, and Ali Gordon in the Channel 4 soap opera Brookside.

== Early life and education ==
Kristopher Ian Mochrie was born on 24 October 1984 in Birkenhead, Merseyside, England, to Lydia and Graham Mochrie. He studied Business at St Edward's College in Liverpool and trained at Manchester School of Acting. Mochrie has been acting since the age of seven.

== Career ==
In 2002 Mochrie was cast as Ali Gordon in the Channel 4 soap opera Brookside, a member of the newly introduced Gordon family. He stayed in the soap until its final episode in November 2003. In 2004 he appeared in an episode of Heartbeat. Throughout 2005, he made appearances in Ideal, Doctors and Girls in Love. In 2006 he appeared in Life on Mars and Waterloo Road. In 2007 Mochrie appeared as Richard Brandon in an episode of The Bill. In 2008 he made an appearance in the medical soap opera The Royal Today.

He rebooted his acting career in 2010, making an appearance as Niall in an episode of the ITV soap opera Emmerdale, before appearing as D.C. Furber in an episode of Coronation Street the following year. In 2015 Mochrie appeared in the BBC drama series Ordinary Lies as Jez, the husband of Emma and an employee at JS Motors. He also made another appearance in Emmerdale as an instructor. In 2016 Mochrie appeared in the short film Rapscallions, before appearing as Captain Ross in the television film To Walk Invisible based on the Brontë family. In 2017 Mochrie played Scott in three episodes of The League of Gentlemen. In 2018 he appeared in the CBBC series' 4 O'Clock Club and Katy and in an episode of Bulletproof as Daley.

In 2019 Mochrie returned to Emmerdale for a third stint, this time on a regular basis as Lee Posner. He made his first appearance in April and departed in October of that year. In 2022 he appeared as Mr Webster in the BBC series Rebel Cheer Squad, followed by an appearance in an episode of the ITV drama Vera as Adam Michaels and as PC Ian Rudge in two episodes of The Long Shadow in 2023.

== Personal life ==
Mochrie is gay and has been in a relationship with actor Max Parker since 2020. They announced their engagement in January 2022. Mochrie and Parker married in August 2025.

In July 2009, Mochrie was sentenced to two years in prison for supplying a class C drug (GHB). His sentence was later reduced to 18 months on appeal and he was released in December 2009.

== Filmography ==
Year	Title	Role	Notes	Ref.
2002–2003	Brookside	Ali Gordon	Regular role	
2004	Heartbeat	Matthew Clegg	Episode: "Hunter's Moon"	
2005	Ideal	Matt	Episode: "The Rat"	
2005	Doctors	Frankie Lewis	Episode: "Skinhead"	
2005	Girls in Love	Robbie Jones	Episode: "Her Boy Friday"	
2006	Life on Mars	Craig	1 episode	
2006	Waterloo Road	Craig Harris	1 episode	
2007	The Bill	Richard Brandon	Episode: "Within Striking Distance"	
2008	The Royal Today	Rick	1 episode	
2010	Emmerdale	Niall	Guest role	
2011	Coronation Street	D.C. Furber	Guest role	
2015	Ordinary Lies	Jez	Main role	
2015	Emmerdale	Instructor	Guest role	
2016	Rapscallions	Unknown	Short film	
2016	To Walk Invisible	Captain Ross	Television film	
2017	The League of Gentlemen	Scott	3 episodes	
2018	4 O'Clock Club	Sean	Episode: "Prank"	
2018	Katy	Dr. Pearson	Episode: "Wild"	
2018	Bulletproof	Daley	1 episode	
2019	Emmerdale	Lee Posner	Regular role	
2022	Rebel Cheer Squad	Mr Webster	Episode: "Get Closer"	
2023	Vera	Adam Michaels	Episode: "The Way the Wind Blows"	
2023	The Long Shadow	PC Ian Rudge	2 episodes	
