= Liam Oh =

American actor (born 1999)

- Born: 1999 (age 26–27); Chicago, Illinois, U.S.
- Education: Northwestern University (BA)
- Occupation: Actor
- Family: Parents, 3 Brothers

Liam Oh (born 1999) is an American actor known for his role as Ray McAffey in the Netflix military series Boots.

== Early life and education ==
Oh was born in 1999 and raised on the outskirts of Chicago alongside his three brothers. He attended Northwestern University and later moved to New York City to pursue his acting career. Oh's background includes Korean and Irish ancestry.

== Career ==
Oh appeared in the world premiere of the musical The Notebook which opened on September 6, 2022, as the character(s) Fin/Justin.

Oh plays Ray McAffey in the Netflix series Boots which premiered on October 9, 2025. Oh has described this role as a "gift" because of the show's deep storyline and friendships and also because of the opportunity to portray a mixed race Asian person. With regard to his role in Boots, Oh revealed that his best friend in real life is gay; as a result, he was immediately drawn to the friendship between his character Ray (who is straight) and main character Cameron (who is gay).

== Stage Credits ==
Year	Show	Role	Theatre	Notes
2022	The Notebook	Fin/Justin	Chicago Shakespeare Theatre	Regional

== Filmography ==
Year	Title	Role
2020	The Thing About Harry	Sexy Guy
2025	Code 3	Chip (uncredited)
2025	Boots	Ray McAffey
