= Mark D. Clookie =

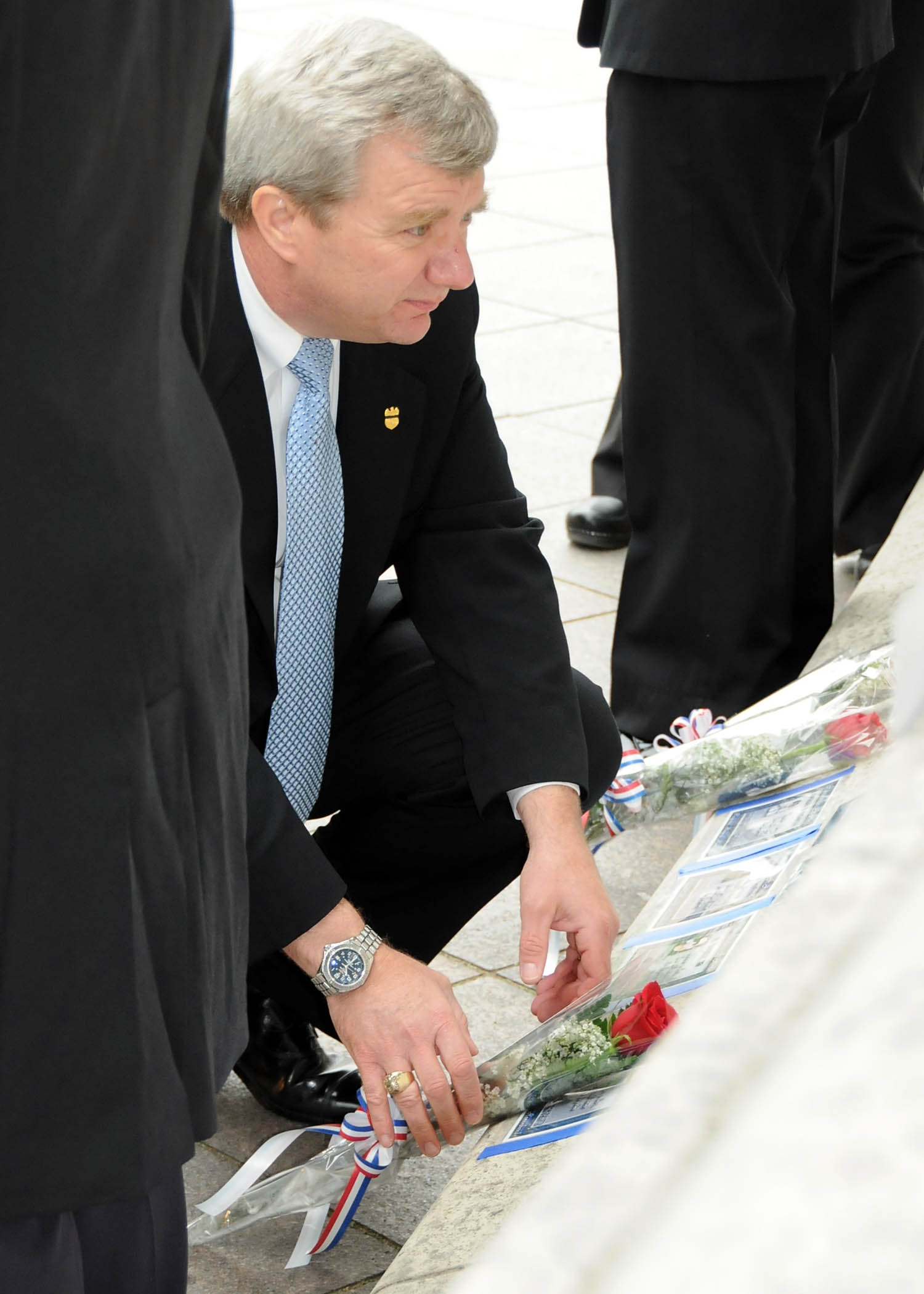
- Director Clookie paying his respects to a fallen NCIS agent at the National Law Enforcement Officers Memorial

Director of the Naval Criminal Investigative Service
- In office February 14, 2010 – March 3, 2013
- President: Barack Obama
- Preceded by: Thomas A. Betro
- Succeeded by: Andrew L. Traver

Mark D. Clookie became the fourth civilian director of the Naval Criminal Investigative Service (NCIS) on February 14, 2010, following his appointment to the position by Ray Mabus, Secretary of the Navy. After his retirement from NCIS in 2013, Clookie worked for an international human rights organization until 2017.

== Career ==
Clookie began his career with the Naval Investigative Service (NIS) in March 1982 at the NIS Resident Agency in Newport, Rhode Island. In June 1987, Special Agent Clookie began a series of tours in the Washington, D.C. area to include: Desk Officer at NIS Headquarters, NIS representative to the Office of the Naval Inspector General, and Assistant Special Agent in Charge of the Washington Fraud Unit.

From July 1993 until December 1995, Special Agent Clookie served as the Resident Agent in Charge of the NCIS Resident Agency Bahrain. After his tour in Bahrain, he was promoted to GS-14 and transferred to the NCIS Northeast Field Office, where he served as the Assistant Special Agent in Charge from December 1995 until June 1998.

In July 1998 Special Agent Clookie moved his family to Okinawa, Japan, where he served as the Resident Agent in Charge until August 2000. He then returned to the United States to assume duties as the Head of Agent Control and Personnel Operations, NCIS Headquarters, Washington, DC.

In August 2001 Special Agent Clookie was promoted to GS-15 and reported to the Pentagon as the Chief, Joint Staff Support Branch, Joint Counterintelligence Center (J2CI). Following the terror attacks of September 11, 2001, he assumed duties as the Special Agent in Charge (SAC) of the NCIS Middle East Field Office, headquartered in Manama, Bahrain. From there, he directed all counterintelligence, counterterrorism and criminal investigative operations throughout the Middle East, East Africa and Southwest Asia. His primary focus was direct support to Navy and Marine Corps Forces Central Command and the Navy's Fifth Fleet.

After more than two years in the Middle East directing NCIS global war on terrorism missions, Clookie returned to NCIS Headquarters, where he served as the executive assistant to the deputy director for management and administration. He also led NCIS modernization initiatives and was later promoted to assistant director for human resources.

In October 2007, Clookie was promoted to senior executive service and assumed responsibilities as the executive assistant director for Middle East and Pacific Operations. In April 2009, Clookie was reassigned as the executive assistant director for combating terrorism.

Clookie appeared in a cameo in an episode of the American television series NCIS: Los Angeles, playing a fictionalized version of himself, NCIS Agent Mark Clookie.

In 2013, after retiring as director, NCIS, Clookie became the vice president of investigations and law enforcement development for the human rights organization International Justice Mission.
