= Andrew L. Traver =

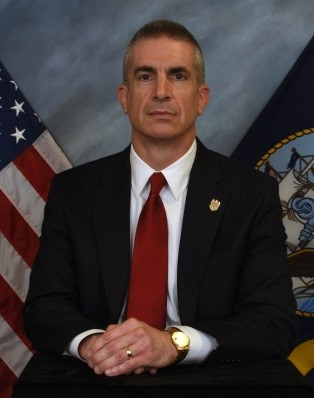

Director of the Naval Criminal Investigative Service
- In office October 7, 2013 – June 3, 2019
- President: Barack Obama; Donald Trump
- Preceded by: Mark D. Clookie
- Succeeded by: Omar R. Lopez

Personal details
- Education: Northern Illinois University

Andrew L. Traver became the fifth civilian Director of the Naval Criminal Investigative Service (NCIS) on October 7, 2013, following his appointment by Ray Mabus, Secretary of the Navy. Traver previously served as Special Agent in Charge of the Denver, Colorado field office for the Bureau of Alcohol, Tobacco, Firearms, and Explosives (ATF).

Traver graduated summa cum laude from Northern Illinois University with a bachelor's degree in Sociology/Criminal Justice, and joined the ATF in 1987.

Traver is a survivor of prostate cancer.

In 2016, Traver cameoed as NCIS Special Agent Gates in an episode of NCIS: Los Angeles. Also referenced was his former ATF agent status.

On June 3, 2019, Traver retired from NCIS after over five years of service as its Director and was replaced by Omar R. Lopez.
