= Naval Criminal Investigative Service =

Law enforcement agency of the U.S. Navy and Marine Corps

United States Naval Criminal Investigative Service
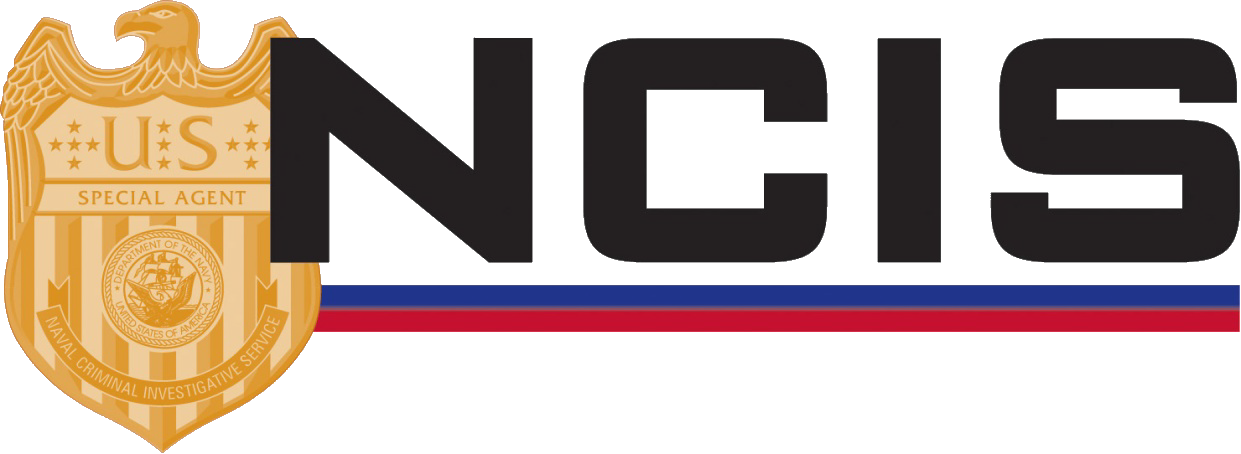
- The NCIS logo

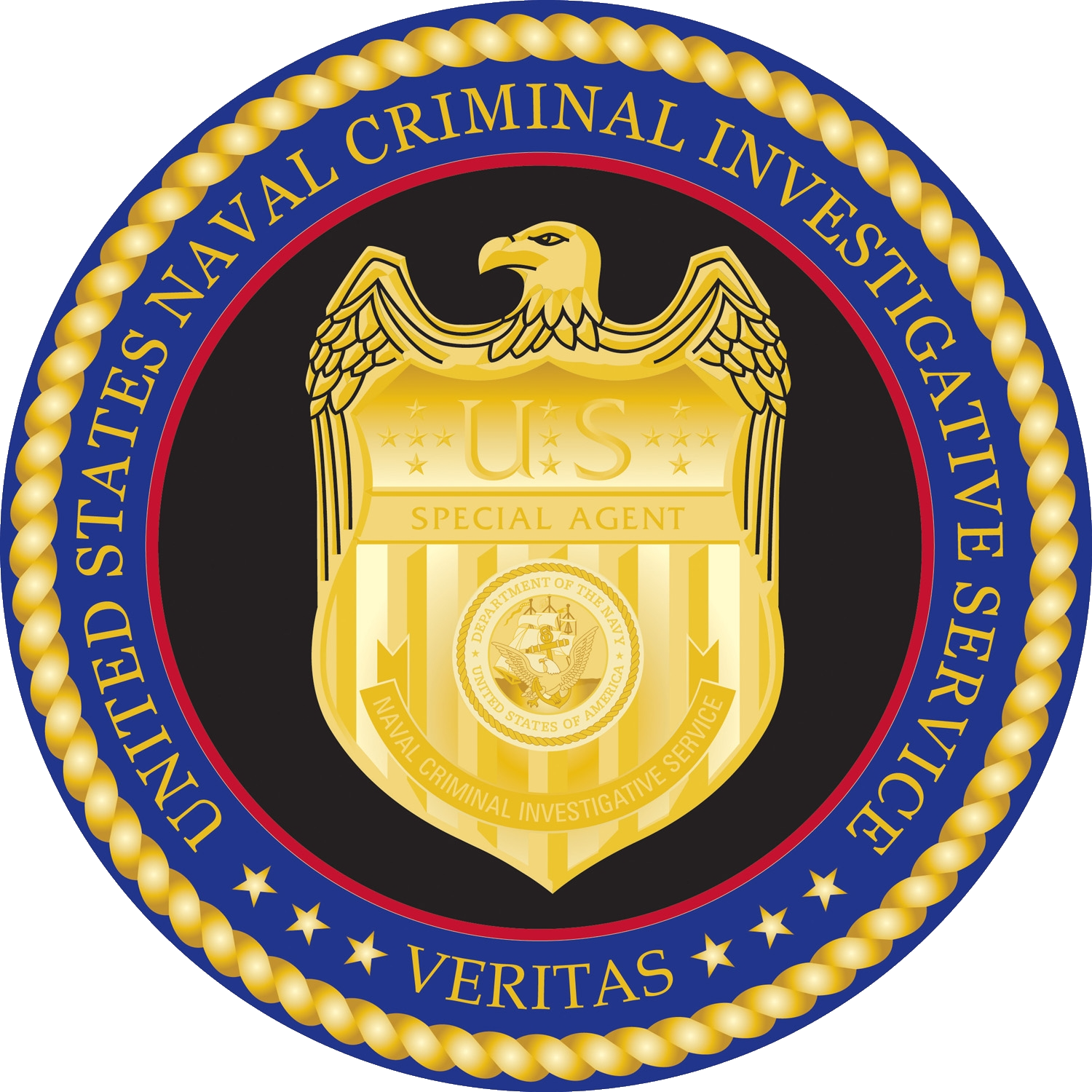
- Seal of the Naval Criminal Investigative Service

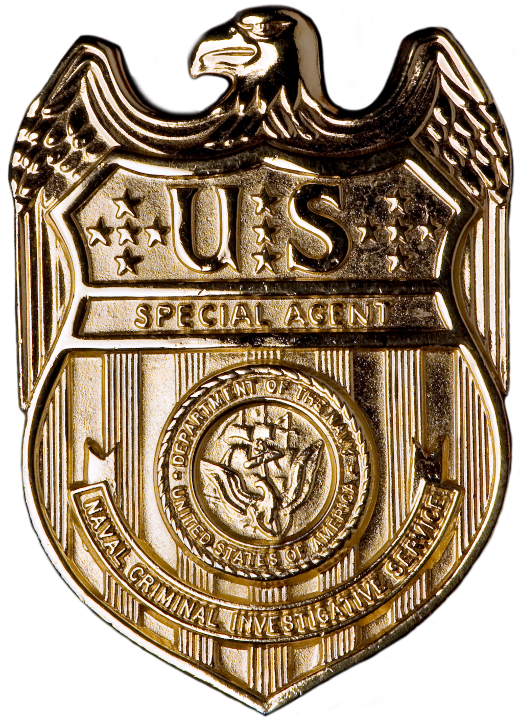
- Badge of an NCIS Special Agent
- Abbreviation: NCIS

Agency overview
- Formed: January 1, 1993; 33 years ago
- Preceding agencies: Naval Investigative Service (1966–1985); Naval Security and Investigative Command (1985–1988); Naval Investigative Service Command (1988–1993)
- Employees: 2,500
- Annual budget: US$460 million (2009)

Jurisdictional structure
- Federal agency: United States
- Operations jurisdiction: United States
- General nature: Federal law enforcement

Operational structure
- Headquarters: Russell-Knox Building, MCB Quantico, Virginia, U.S.
- Special agents: 1,250
- Agency executives: Omar R. Lopez, Director; Gregory A. Scovel Jr., Deputy Director; Elizabeth L. Pierri, Deputy Director of Operational Support
- Parent agency: United States Department of the Navy
- Units: Units: Behavioral Science Group; Cold Case Homicide Unit; Law Enforcement Information Exchange; Major Case Response Team; Multiple Threat Alert Center; Office of Forensic Support; Office of Military Support; Office of Special Projects; Office of Strategic Support; Polygraph Services Division; Technical Services Division; Technical Surveillance Countermeasures
- Field offices: 17: Carolinas; Central; Contingency Response; Cyber Operations; Europe & Africa; Far East; Hawaii; Marine West; Middle East; Norfolk; Northeast; Northwest; Protective Operations; Southeast; Southeast Asia; Southwest; Washington

Facilities
- Cars: Dodge Chargers, Ford Crown Victoria Police Interceptors, Cadillacs (Protective Operations)

Website
- ncis.navy.mil

The United States Naval Criminal Investigative Service (NCIS) is the primary investigative law enforcement agency of the United States Department of the Navy. Its primary function is to investigate major criminal activities involving the Navy and Marine Corps. However, its broad mandate includes national security, counterintelligence, counterterrorism, cyberwarfare, and the protection of U.S. naval assets worldwide.

NCIS is the successor organization to the former Naval Investigative Service (NIS), which was established by the Office of Naval Intelligence after World War II. One-half of NCIS personnel are non-commissioned staff, with the other half being sworn investigators — 1811 series special agents. NCIS agents are armed federal law enforcement investigators, who frequently coordinate with other U.S. government agencies and have a presence in more than 41 countries and on U.S. Navy vessels. NCIS special agents are supported by analysts and other experts skilled in disciplines such as forensics, surveillance, surveillance countermeasures, computer investigations, physical security, and polygraph examinations.

== History ==
=== Origins ===
NCIS traces its origins to Navy Department General Order 292 of 1882, signed by William H. Hunt, Secretary of the Navy, which established the Office of Naval Intelligence (ONI). Initially, ONI was tasked with collecting information on the characteristics and weaponry of foreign vessels, charting foreign passages, rivers, or other bodies of water, and touring overseas fortifications, industrial plants, and shipyards. In anticipation of the United States entry into World War I, ONI's responsibilities expanded to include espionage, sabotage, and all manner of information on the U.S. Navy's potential adversaries. The plan contemplated obtaining information by both overt and covert means, and, in the fall of 1916, the first branch office (a small undercover unit) was established in New York City under the supervision of the ONI. Heavy reliance was placed on reserve, active duty, and civilian operatives, many of the latter serving voluntarily and without pay. Rapid demobilization and the desire to return to normalcy after World War I saw investigative activity reduced to a virtual standstill. In early 1926, initiatives were undertaken to organize special groups of volunteer reserve intelligence officers who were envisioned to obtain information on persons and activities that might threaten the naval establishment, as well as provide a cadre of trained personnel in the event of a national emergency.

During the early and mid-1930s, the development of an independent professional investigative capability within the Navy was being nurtured. In Washington, D.C., the first civilian agent was employed in 1936 on a verbal basis and paid by personal check of the Director of Naval Intelligence. He was followed by a small handful of civilian special agents who were seeded throughout the naval districts beginning in 1936, although by September 1937 they numbered only 14 nationwide. In June 1939, President Roosevelt directed that ONI handle the investigation of Navy cases relating to sabotage, espionage, and subversive activities. By the fall of 1940, selective call-up of intelligence reservists for investigative and counterintelligence duties was undertaken on a broad scale and following entry into World War II, the Navy's investigative arm was staffed almost exclusively by reserve officers. Their primary tasks related to personnel security inquiries, sabotage, and espionage cases, investigation of Japanese activities in the United States, and war fraud matters. A peak was reached in 1943 when over 97,000 separate investigations were conducted by what was known as the "Naval Intelligence Service." After World War II, there was again a general demobilization, resulting in only a small corps of civilian special agents being retained. Although the Secretary of the Navy extended investigative jurisdiction in 1945, no meaningful expansion of personnel occurred until the Korean conflict when a major buildup of civilian agents took place.

=== NIS and the Cold War ===
Until the late 1950s, District Intelligence Office operations were under the command supervision of Naval District Commandants, and investigative effort was frequently parochial, fragmented, and on occasion, duplicative from one district to another. Workload, manpower, and jurisdiction in investigations and counterintelligence broadened following the Korean conflict. Several significant changes in organization and policy occurred during the 1950s and 1960s, as well as refinements in mission, which culminated in the establishment of the Naval Investigative Service (NIS) in February 1966. In the early 1970s, an NIS special agent was stationed on USS Intrepid for six months. This marked the beginning of the "Deployment Afloat" program, now called the Special Agent Afloat program, which deploys special agents for year-long assignments aboard carrier battle groups and amphibious readiness groups. In 1972, background investigations were transferred from NIS to the newly formed Defense Investigative Service (DIS), allowing NIS to give more attention to criminal investigations and counter-intelligence. The 1970s also saw NIS' first female agent, who was stationed at Naval Air Station Miramar, California in 1975.

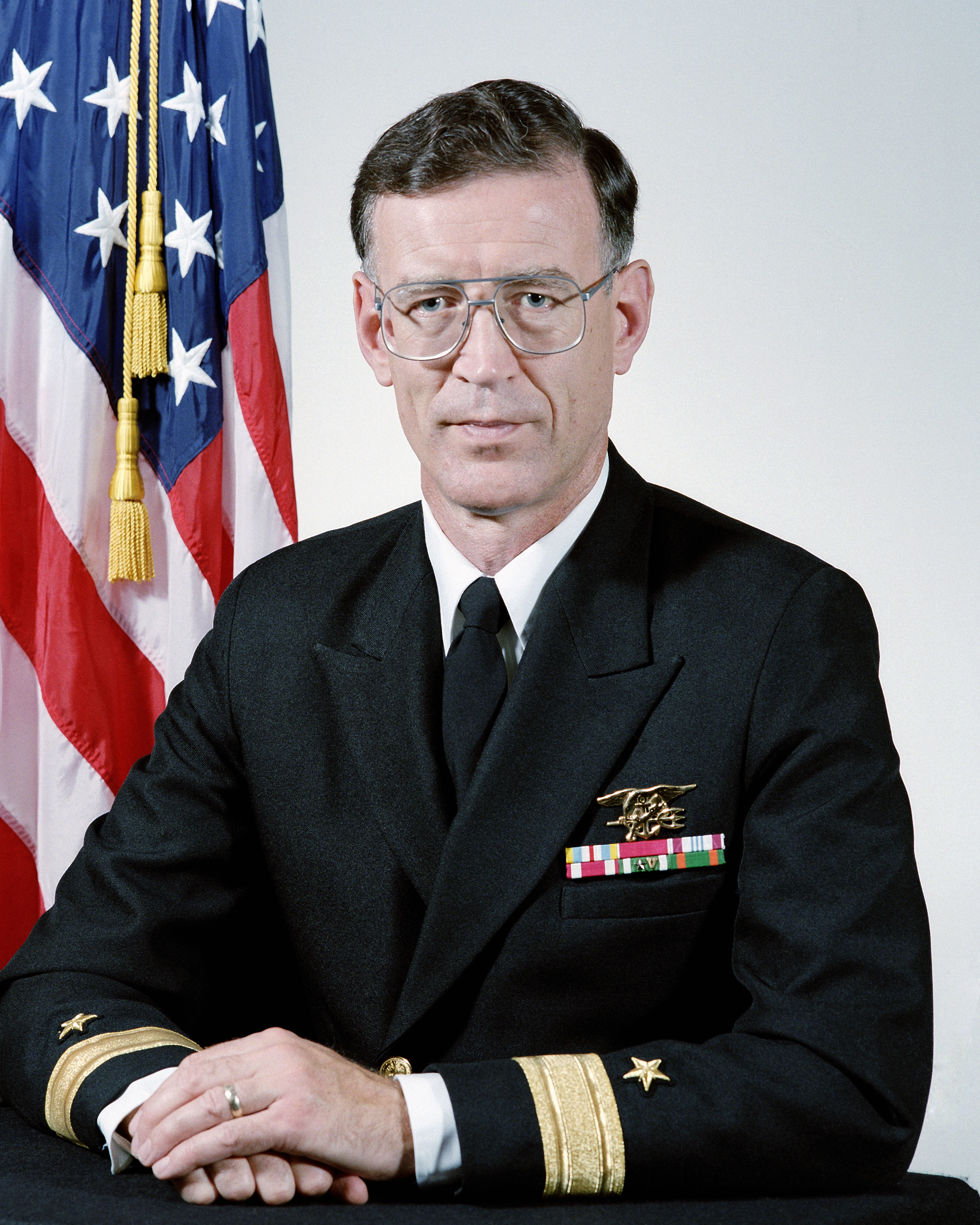
Rear Adm. Cathal Flynn in 1985

In October 1981, NIS became a Second Echelon Command under the Chief of Naval Operations. In August 1985, the Secretary of the Navy directed the appointment of a flag-rank naval officer to hold the position of Commander, NIS, reporting directly to the Chief of Naval Operations and the Secretary of the Navy. Rear Admiral Cathal L. Flynn, a Navy SEAL officer, became the first admiral to lead NIS. Additionally, in 1982, two classes of NIS Special Agents were trained at the Federal Law Enforcement Training Center (FLETC) in Glynco, Georgia, in an assessment of the school's capability to train military investigators. Before this and subsequently until 1984, NIS Special Agent Training was in ONI Headquarters in Suitland, Maryland. In 1984, NIS Special Agents began training at FLETC, along with other federal investigative agencies, except for the Federal Bureau of Investigation, the Drug Enforcement Administration, and the United States Postal Inspection Service.

Two months after the October 1983 bombing of the Marine Barracks in Beirut, the agency opened the Anti-Terrorist Alert Center (ATAC), a 24-hour-a-day operational intelligence center that issued indications and warnings on terrorist activity to Navy and Marine Corps commands. ATAC was the facility at which Jonathan Pollard was working when he committed the acts of espionage for which he was convicted in 1987. In 2002 the ATAC became the Multiple Threat Alert Center (MTAC). On November 15, 1985, NIS was re-designated as the Naval Security and Investigative Command (NSIC) and broadened its missions to include management of the DON Security Program. These programs included naval information, physical, and personnel security; adjudication for security clearances; and Navy law enforcement and physical security. This resulted in NSIC also assuming control of the Navy's Master-at-Arms program and the military working dog program. In 1986, the Department of the Navy Central Adjudication Facility (DoN CAF) was established and placed under the agency, as the agency was now once again responsible for adjudicating security clearances (although not the actual investigations). DoN CAF renders approximately 200,000 eligibility determinations annually for the Department of the Navy. On September 27, 1988, NSIC was changed to the Naval Investigative Service Command (NISC), though the organization at large was still known as the Naval Investigative Service (NIS) and the command generally referred only to the NIS headquarters element, similarly how the United States Army Criminal Investigation Command commanded all Criminal Investigation Division (CID) elements.

In 1991, NIS was responsible for investigating the Tailhook scandal, which involved allegations of sexual misconduct and harassment by Naval and Marine Corps officers in Las Vegas, Nevada. After this investigation, and at the direction of the chairman of the US Senate Armed Services Committee, Senator Sam Nunn, the Naval Investigative Service was restructured into the Naval Criminal Investigative Service (NCIS). The restructuring occurred as a result of perceived lapses in proper investigative technique over the Tailhook scandal, as well as chain of command issues and a lack of civilian oversight in previous investigations. At the time, Senator Nunn stated, "The Navy's whole investigative technique should be under serious question." As a result of the investigation into the Tailhook scandal, the Pentagon's inspector general was sharply critical of NIS leadership, stating that there was a top-down culture showing a lack of cooperation with other authorities in the Navy. By 1992, Acting Secretary of the Navy, Sean O'Keefe, recommended the word "Criminal" be included in NIS's name to make clear their investigative function. Ultimately, NIS commander, Rear Adm. Duvall Williams Jr., was forced to retire and NIS was reorganized as NCIS under civilian leadership.

=== Recent history ===
In 1993, the NCIS mission was again clarified and became a mostly civilian agency. Roy D. Nedrow, a former United States Secret Service (USSS) executive, was appointed as the first civilian director and the name changed from Naval Investigative Service Command to Naval Criminal Investigative Service (NCIS). NCIS was aligned as an echelon two activity under the Secretary of the Navy, via the General Counsel. Nedrow oversaw the restructuring of NCIS into a Federal law enforcement agency with 14 field offices controlling field operations in 140 locations worldwide. In 1995, NCIS introduced the Cold Case Homicide Unit, the first dedicated federal-level cold case homicide unit. The unit has resolved 61 cases since 1995. In May 1997, David L. Brant was appointed director of NCIS by Secretary of the Navy John Howard Dalton. Director Brant retired in December 2005. He was succeeded by Director Thomas A. Betro, who was appointed director of NCIS in January 2006, by Secretary of the Navy Donald C. Winter. Betro retired in September 2009. On September 13, 2009, deputy director of Operations Gregory A. Scovel was appointed acting director by Under Secretary of the Navy, Robert Work. He served concurrently as deputy director for operations until the new director was selected.

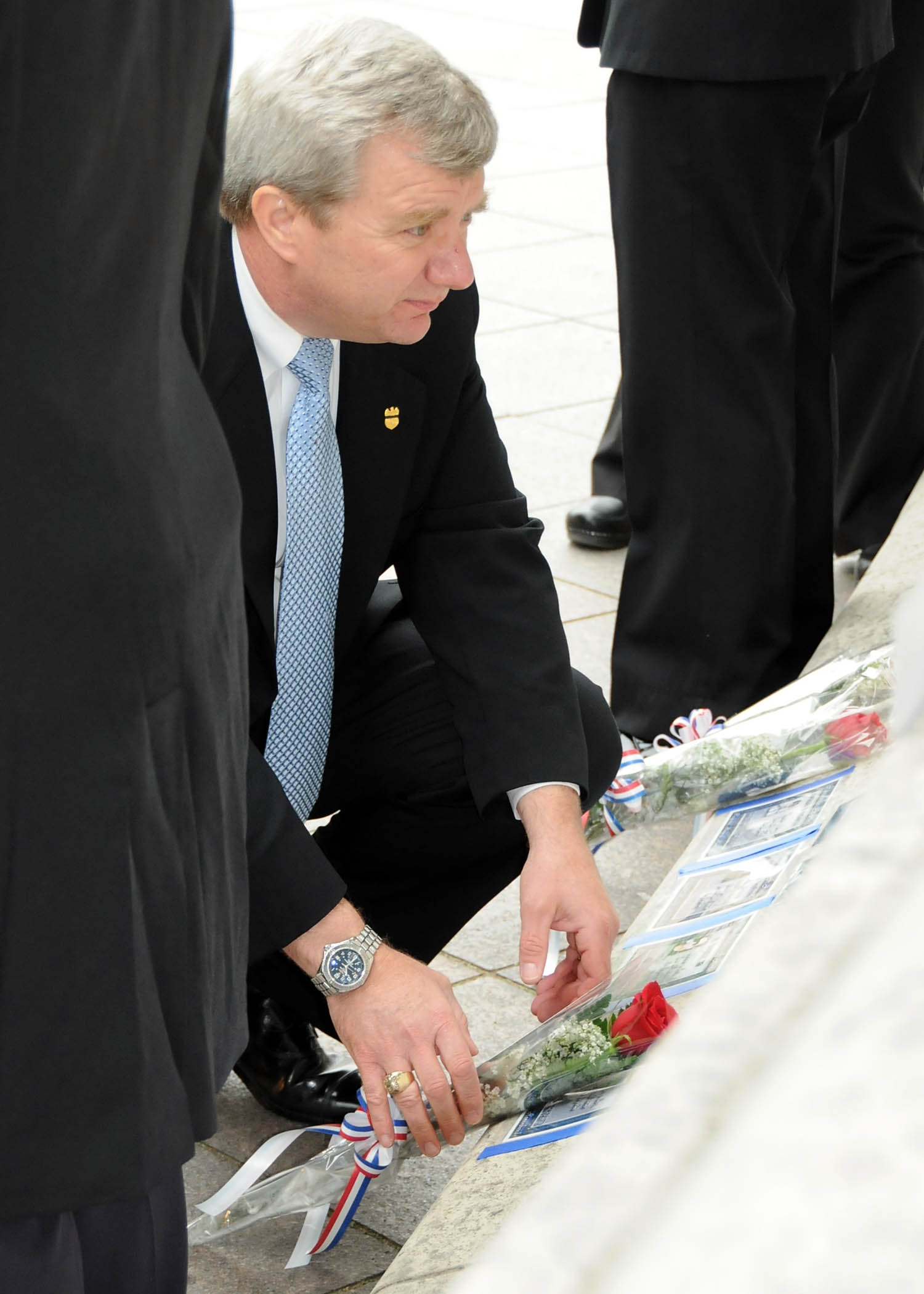
Mark D. Clookie, director of NCIS, at the National Law Enforcement Officers Memorial

In 1999, NCIS and the Marine Corps Criminal Investigation Division (USMC CID) signed a memorandum of understanding calling for the integration of Marine Corps CID into NCIS. (USMC CID continues to exist to investigate misdemeanor felonies and other criminal offenses not under NCIS investigative jurisdiction.)

In 2000, Congress granted NCIS civilian special agents authority to execute warrants and make arrests. Virtually all NCIS investigators, criminal, counterintelligence, and force protection personnel are now sworn civilian personnel with powers of arrest and warrant service. The exceptions are a small number of reserve military elements engaged in counter-intelligence support. A growing appreciation of the changing threat facing the Department of the Navy in the 21st century, culminating with the terrorist bombing of the USS Cole (DDG-67) in Yemen and the September 11 attacks, led NCIS to transform the Anti-Terrorist Alert Center into the Multiple Threat Alert Center (MTAC) in 2002. NCIS agents were the first U.S. law enforcement personnel on the scene at the USS Cole bombing, the Limburg bombing and the terrorist attack in Mombasa, Kenya. NCIS has conducted fraud investigations resulting in over half a billion dollars in recoveries and restitution to the U.S. government and the U.S. Navy since 1997. NCIS investigates any death occurring on a Navy vessel or Navy or Marine Corps aircraft or installation (except when the cause of death is medically attributable to disease or natural causes). NCIS oversees the Master-at-Arms programs for the Navy, overseeing 8800 Masters-at-Arms and the Military Working Dog program. NCIS's three strategic priorities are to prevent terrorism, protect secrets, and reduce crime. Current missions for NCIS include criminal investigations, force protection, cross-border drug enforcement, counterterrorism, major procurement fraud, computer crime and counter-intelligence.

NCIS Special Agent Peter Garza conducted the first court-ordered Internet wiretap in the United States.

Jonathan Jay Pollard was an NIS analyst who was convicted of spying for Israel after being caught by NIS and FBI. He received a life sentence in 1987.

On February 14, 2010, Mark D. Clookie became the fourth civilian director of NCIS, having been appointed to the position by Secretary of the Navy Ray Mabus. In June 2010, NCIS undertook a major reorganization that created a single deputy director position, having previously had two (deputy director of operations and deputy director of management and administration), a combination of the Combating Terrorism Directorate and the Counterintelligence Directorate into a single directorate (the National Security Directorate), and the creation of the Global Operations Directorate. The Global Operations Directorate was created to direct field elements in multiple functional areas that had previously been directed from NCIS Headquarters.

In December 2012, the FBI released redacted documents regarding operations against Occupy Wall Street. In one FBI report, the NCIS is quoted as looking into links between Occupy and "organized labor actions" in December 2011. In January 2013, the Department of the Navy Central Adjudication Facility (DoN CAF) was consolidated, along with the other Central Adjudications Facilities within the Department of Defense (DoD), into a single organization, known as the DoD CAF, per the direction of the Deputy Secretary of Defense. The DoD CAF is currently the sole authority to determine security clearance eligibility of non-Intelligence Agency DoD personnel occupying sensitive positions and/or requiring access to classified material including Sensitive Compartmented Information. On October 7, 2013, Andrew L. Traver became the fifth civilian director of NCIS, having been appointed to the position by the Secretary of the Navy Ray Mabus. Traver leads an agency that is composed of some 2,500 civilian and military personnel and has a presence in over 150 locations worldwide. He is responsible for executing an annual operating budget of approximately $460 million.

In 2014, in the aftermath of the Washington Navy Yard shooting, NCIS formed the Regional Enforcement Action Capabilities Training (REACT) team, now known as the Regional Enforcement Action Capabilities Team. REACT teams are designed to support investigations and "high-risk" enforcement operations within the United States, including high-risk operations that involve the service of arrest and search warrants, undercover agent and source protection/rescue, undercover operations, high-risk surveillance, and high-risk protective assignments.

On June 4, 2019, Omar R. Lopez became the sixth civilian director of NCIS, having been appointed to the position by the Secretary of the Navy, Richard V. Spencer. Director Lopez is responsible for approximately 2,000 personnel, including 1,000 federal special agents, in 191 locations around the world. In late 2019, NCIS went through additional organizational changes. In October, the Central Field Office was reactivated (having originally been deactivated at the end of 2015). As its name suggests, the Central Field Office is responsible for investigations and operations in the Central United States. In December, the position of deputy director was redesignated as the deputy director of operations, and the principal executive assistant director was redesignated as the deputy director of operational support.

== Organization ==
=== Rank structure ===
The following is a listing of the rank structure found within NCIS for Special Agents:

Field elements	Headquarters elements
New Agent Trainee (NAT)	New Agent Trainee (NAT)
Special Agent (SA)	Special Agent (SA)
Junior Special Agent (JSA)	Junior Special Agent (JSA)
Senior Special Agent (Sr. SA)	Deputy Team Leader
†Supervisory Special Agent (SSA)	Team Leader
Assistant Special Agent-in-Charge (ASAC)	†Division Chief
Special Agent-in-Charge (SAC)	†Deputy Assistant Director (DAD)
Senior executive staff
†Assistant Director (AD)
†Executive Assistant Director (EAD)
Deputy Director of Operations (DDO)	Deputy Director of Operational Support (DDOS)
Director

Notes:

- †: May be sworn special agents filling civilian positions mainly at Headquarters.

==== Badges and credentials ====
Permanent NCIS credentials consist of two cards. Card A (upper credential) identifies the agency, name, seal, and bearer title. Card B (lower credential) consists of a statement of authority, bearer photograph, credential number, the Director's signature, and bearer signature.

- Special Agent, issued a golden badge inscribed with the words Special Agent. Credentials and badges are only issued to 1811 Criminal Investigators and Marine Corps personnel designated as Special Agents. The bearer's authority is outlined on all Special Agent credentials as: "is authorized as a Federal Law Enforcement Officer to carry firearms and conduct investigations of violations of the laws of the United States of America for the Department of the Navy."
- Agent, issued a silver badge inscribed with the word Agent. Credentials and badges are issued to qualified and approved naval reservists assigned to the NCIS Office of Military Support who perform investigative or counterintelligence duties. The bearer's authority is outlined on all Agent credentials as: "is authorized to carry firearms and conduct investigations of violations of the laws of the United States of America for the Department of the Navy."
- Investigator, issued a silver badge inscribed with the word Investigator. Credentials and badges are only issued to 1810 Investigators who perform investigative and/or counterintelligence duties.
- Operational Representative, issued a silver badge inscribed with the words Operational Representative when it is deemed necessary by the concerned Special Agent in Charge or deputy assistant director. The badge of an Operational Representative conveys no police powers and is only used to quickly identify the holder as a law enforcement affiliate to ensure the employee's safety or to effectively accomplish his/her assigned operational duties. Credentials are issued to personnel who actively participate as non-law enforcement officers in the operational aspects of criminal investigations and operations, counterintelligence investigations and operations, collection activity and analysis, and Department of the Navy law enforcement and security. Employees who qualify for these credentials include but are not limited to the following series: intelligence specialist/intelligence operations specialist (0132), investigations specialist (1801), foreign national investigator (FN pay grades), investigative computer specialist (2210), physical security specialist (0080), training specialist (1712), forensic scientist (1301), evidence custodian (0303), and Department of Defense military security personnel under the operational control of the Protective Operations Field Office.
- Administrative Representative, no badge issued. Credentials are issued to professional administrative staff to conduct official business in furtherance of the responsibilities and mission of NCIS.
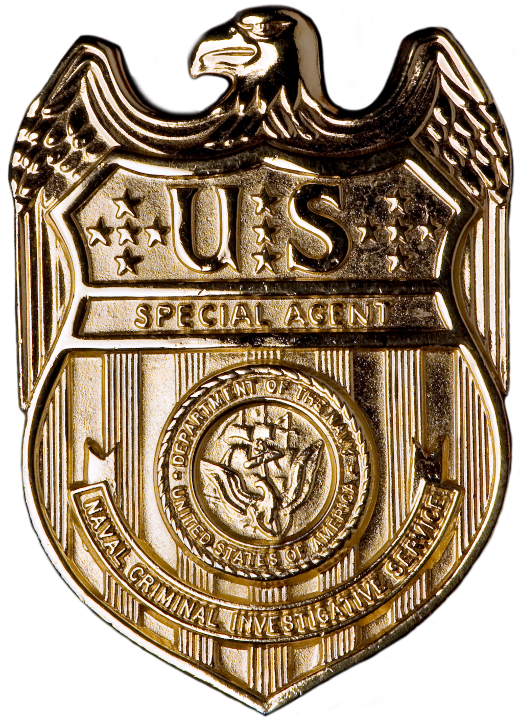
Badge of an NCIS Special Agent

Badge of an NCIS Agent

Badge of an NCIS Operational Representative

=== Organizational structure ===
The Naval Criminal Investigative Service is headed by the director of NCIS who is directly responsible to the Secretary of the Navy for the operations of NCIS. The director is supervised by the Under Secretary of the Navy with the assistance of the General Counsel of the Navy and receives guidance from the NCIS Board of Directors, an advisory group chaired by the Under Secretary of the Navy that includes the General Counsel of the Navy, Vice Chief of Naval Operations, Assistant Commandant of the Marine Corps, and the director of NCIS. The director directs and supervises the activities of NCIS exercises leadership through a strategic vision and exercises his/her direction through the deputy directors.

The NCIS currently has two deputy directors, the deputy director of operations, who is responsible for the day-to-day oversight and management of the operational directorates, and the deputy director of operational support, who is responsible for the day-to-day oversight and management of the support directorates.

The operational and support directorates are managed by an executive assistant director except some support directorates, which are managed by an assistant director. An assistant director is also assigned to some operational and support directorates to serve as the chief operations officer, responsible for assisting the EAD with the day-to-day oversight and management of the directorate.

The Naval Criminal Investigative Service has worked on cases in collaboration with the United States Department of Justice, FBI Joint Terrorism Task Force, the ATF, United States Secret Service and other agencies.

==== Headquarters ====
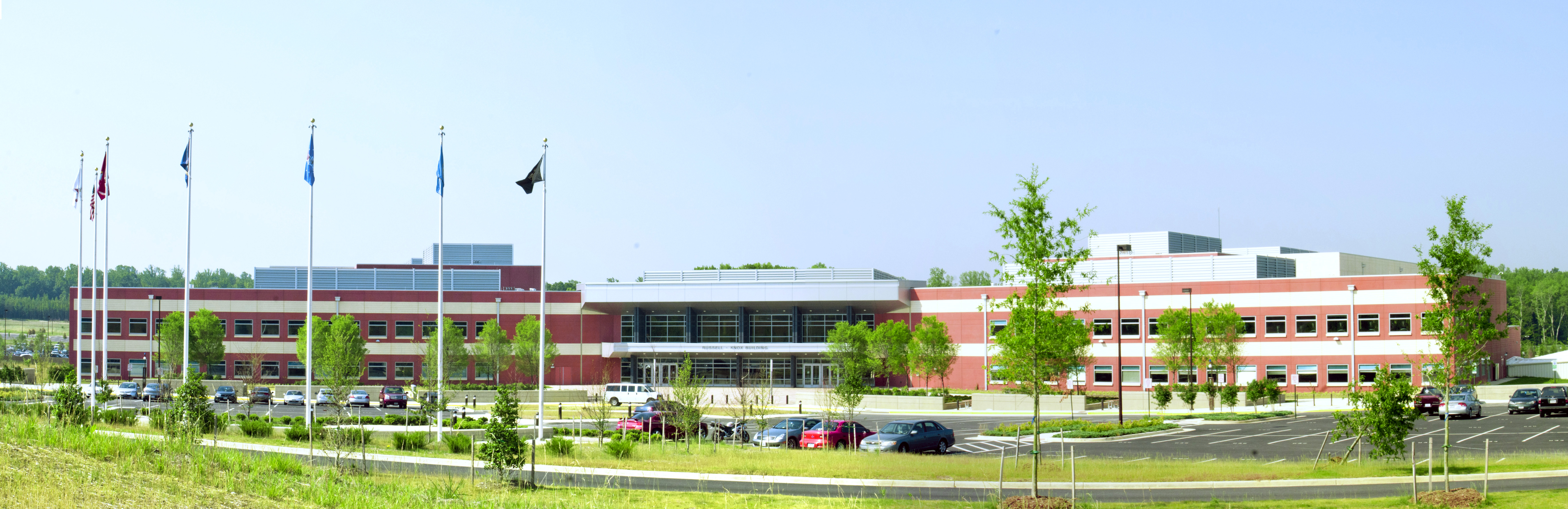
Russell-Knox Building, Quantico, Virginia

- NCIS Headquarters, Russell-Knox Building, Marine Corps Base Quantico, Virginia.
  - The Russell-Knox Building also houses the headquarters of the United States Army Criminal Investigation Division, Department of the Air Force Office of Special Investigations, and the Defense Counterintelligence and Security Agency. Components of the Defense Intelligence Agency are also located at RKB.

The Russell-Knox Building (RKB), named after U.S. Marine Corps Major General John Henry Russell Jr. and U.S. Navy Commodore Dudley Wright Knox, was built based on the findings of the 2005 Base Realignment and Closure Commission. The commission authorized the project to build the RKB as there was a need to co-locate the headquarters of the different criminal investigative agencies of the U.S. military.

Before the NCIS headquarters was moved to the Russell-Knox Building in 2011, it was located at the Washington Navy Yard in Washington, D.C.

===== Office of the Director =====
The Office of the Director serves as the central administrative arm of the Director. The office encompasses the director, the deputy directors, and the director's staff. The office is headed by the chief of staff who is accountable to the director, via the daily supervision of the deputy director of operational support, for the effective operation and administration of the office of the director.

Other components reporting directly to the director and/or deputy directors are:

- NCIS Inspector General
- NCIS Counsel, Office of the General Counsel of the Navy
- NCIS Comptroller

==== Operational directorates ====
The operational directorates of NCIS are supervised by the deputy director of operations who is the Chief Operations Officer of NCIS, responsible for criminal investigations, counterintelligence, counterterrorism, tri-service operations (Atlantic, Pacific, and Global), biometrics, technical surveillance countermeasures, behavioral science, technical services, Regional Enforcement Action Capabilities Team (REACT), polygraph services, and forensics.

The NCIS currently has two types of operational directorates: functional and field.

The functional directorates are the National Security Directorate and the Criminal Operations Directorate. These directorates are responsible for outlining the goals and objectives of NCIS relating to their functional area through the Program Direction Document. The executive assistant directors exercise direction and supervision of their Program Direction Document through the three field directorates. The EADs also advise the deputy director of operations on the three field directorate executive assistant directors' performance in meeting the outlined goals and objectives.

The field directorates are the Atlantic Operations Directorate, the Pacific Operations Directorate, and the Global Operations Directorate.

The geographic Atlantic Operations and Pacific Operations directorates are divided into field offices, each headed by a Special Agent in Charge (SAC), while the functional Global Operations Directorate is divided into field offices and field operational support elements, headed by Special Agents in Charge or division chiefs. The SAC/division chief is responsible for all operational, investigative, and administrative activities within their geographical/functional area of responsibility. They exercise leadership in the geographic implementation of NCIS' goals and objectives through the direction and supervision of Assistant Special Agents in Charge (ASAC) and Supervisory Special Agents (SSA). In field offices with only one ASAC, the ASAC is the Chief Operations Officer of the field office, responsible for the day-to-day oversight and management of its activities. In field offices with multiple ASACs, the ASACs serve as the heads of specific functions within the field office (e.g. ASAC of Criminal Investigations or ASAC of Atlantic Operations). The field office headquarters also has specialized teams, headed by Supervisory Special Agents, ready to support the field office's subordinate units by dispatching experienced Special Agents and/or civilian investigators to assist in investigations if a prolonged investigation is required or the investigative resources required exceeds the subordinate unit's capabilities. Usually, the senior-most Special Agent of the field team is designated as the Senior Field Agent who may also have some operational and/or administrative responsibilities.

The geographic field offices are divided into NCIS Resident Agencies (NCISRA) and NCIS Resident Units (NCISRU). NCISRA's are headed by Supervisory Special Agents (designated as Resident Agents in Charge) who supervise all sworn Special Agents and civilian personnel assigned to the NCISRA. Depending on the size or location of the NCISRA, the Resident Agent in Charge may also supervise other Supervisory Special Agents who serve as team leaders, responsible for a specific investigative/operational function within the NCISRA (e.g. SSA of Counter-Terrorism). Some NCISRAs are further divided into NCISRUs, which are small units consisting of only one or two Special Agents (designated as Resident Agents) who report directly to the Resident Agent in Charge of the "parent NCISRA." In NCISRU which is staffed by multiple Special Agents, the senior-most Special Agent is designated as the Senior Resident Agent and may also have some operational and/or administrative responsibilities. NCIS Special Agent Afloat duty posts are also classified as NCISRUs (e.g. NCISRU USS George H.W. Bush). NCISRUs afloat are under the functional supervision of the field office responsible for the vessel's homeport but receive operational support from the field office responsible for the area where the ship is sailing in.

===== National Security Directorate =====
The National Security Directorate has program management oversight of counter-terrorism/counterintelligence investigations and operations, including espionage, terrorism, compromise, technology transfer, cyber intrusion, insider threats, and threats to research development and acquisition programs. The Directorate is also responsible for manning, training, and equipping agency personnel to protect Navy and Marine Corps forces, operations, information, facilities, equipment, and networks from attacks and the intelligence activities of foreign governments and international terrorist organizations.

The National Security Directorate is managed by an executive assistant director with the assistance of an assistant director. The directorate is divided into multiple programmatic departments which are headed by deputy assistant directors (comparable in practice to special agents in charge). The departments are further divided into divisions led by division chiefs (comparable in practice to assistant special agents in charge).

In 2015, the National Security Directorate comprised (at least) the following departments and divisions:

- Program Direction Department
- Investigations Department
  - Investigations Division
  - Insider Threat Division
  - National Joint Terrorism Task Force Deputy Unit Chief
- Operations Department
  - RDA/Irregular Warfare Division
  - Operations Division
  - Sensitive Pro. Integration Division
- Analytic Division
- National Security Law Division

===== Criminal Investigations and Operations Directorate =====
The Criminal Investigations and Operations Directorate has program management oversight of a myriad of criminal investigations and operations which include death, sexual assault, narcotics, and procurement fraud investigations. The directorate is also responsible for the manning, training, and equipping of agency personnel to accomplish the investigative mission, and for the operational execution of both reactive and proactive major criminal investigative activities for the Department of the Navy.

The Criminal Operations Directorate is managed by an executive assistant director with the assistance of an assistant director. The directorate is divided into multiple programmatic departments which are headed by deputy assistant directors (comparable in practice to special agents in charge). The departments are further divided into divisions led by division chiefs (comparable in practice to assistant special agents in charge).

In 2015, the Criminal Investigations and Operations Directorate comprised (at least) the following departments and divisions:

- Program Direction Department
- Investigations and Operations Department
  - REACT
  - Death/Violent Crimes & Cold Cases
  - Family and Sexual Violence and Threat Management
  - Transnational Crimes
- Economic Crimes Department (this has since been re-designated as the Economic Crimes Field Office of the Global Operations Directorate)
- Law Enforcement, Protection, Assessments, and Security Training Division

===== Global Operations Directorate =====
The Global Operations Directorate is responsible for field elements that execute worldwide investigations and operations associated with espionage, counterintelligence, protective service operations, economic crimes, contingency response, high-risk deployments, technical surveillance countermeasures, polygraph services, technical services, and forensic services.

The Global Operations Directorate and nearly all of its subordinate elements are headquartered aboard Joint Base Anacostia–Bolling in Washington, D.C., although they maintain multiple operational detachments all over the world in support of geographical field offices. The only exception to this is the Contingency Response Field Office, which is headquartered at the Federal Law Enforcement Training Centers at Glynco, Georgia.

- Contingency Response Field Office (CRFO) is responsible for all NCIS high-risk and contingency deployments.
- Cyber Operations Field Office (CBFO) conducts worldwide cyber investigations, proactive cyber operations, and cyber forensics support for the Department of the Navy (DON).
- Economic Crimes Field Office (ECFO) conducts and oversees investigations of major procurement fraud, product substitution, bribery, and corruption.
- Office of Forensic Support (OFS) provides forensic crime scene support to DON investigations.
- Office of Special Projects (OSP) conducts espionage investigations, surveillance operations, and offensive counterintelligence operations within DON.
- Office of Strategic Support (OSS) provides counterintelligence support to the Department of Defense (DoD) and DON special access programs, the Defense Advanced Research Projects Agency (DARPA), as well as other DON/DoD research and development agencies.
- Office of Technical Surveillance and Countermeasures (TSCM) protects DON classified information and critical infrastructure from being compromised by technical means.
- Polygraph Services Division (PSD) conducts DON criminal polygraphs, counterintelligence scope polygraphs, and pre-employment polygraphs.
- Protective Operations Field Office (POFO) provides and manages full-time protection details on key Department of the Navy personnel.
- Technical Services Field Office (TSFO) provides DON positive technical support for criminal, counterintelligence, and counter-terrorism investigations and operations.
Areas of responsibility of the NCIS field offices.

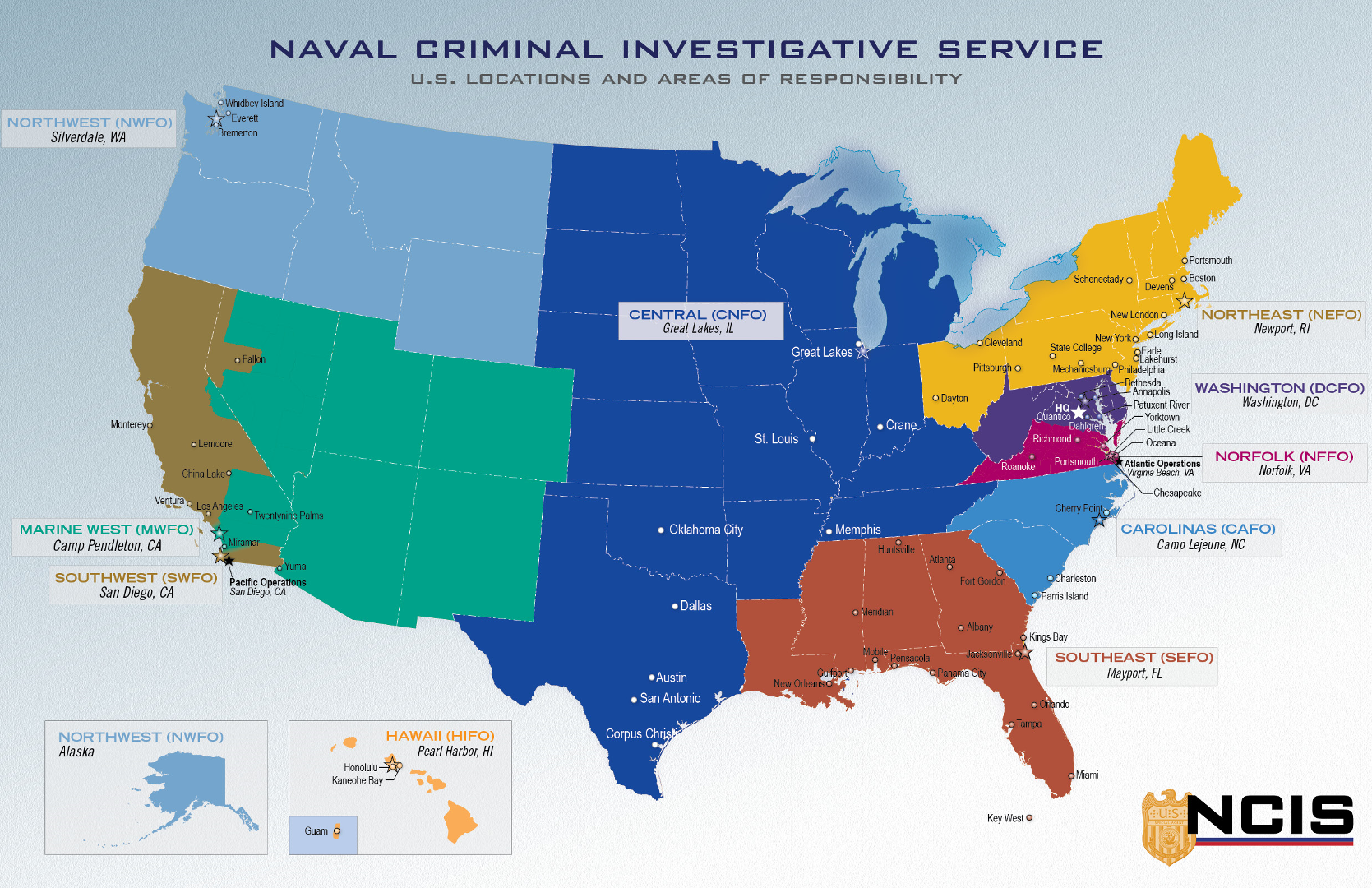
Map of the U.S.-based NCIS Field Offices and their subordinate Resident Agencies and Resident Units.

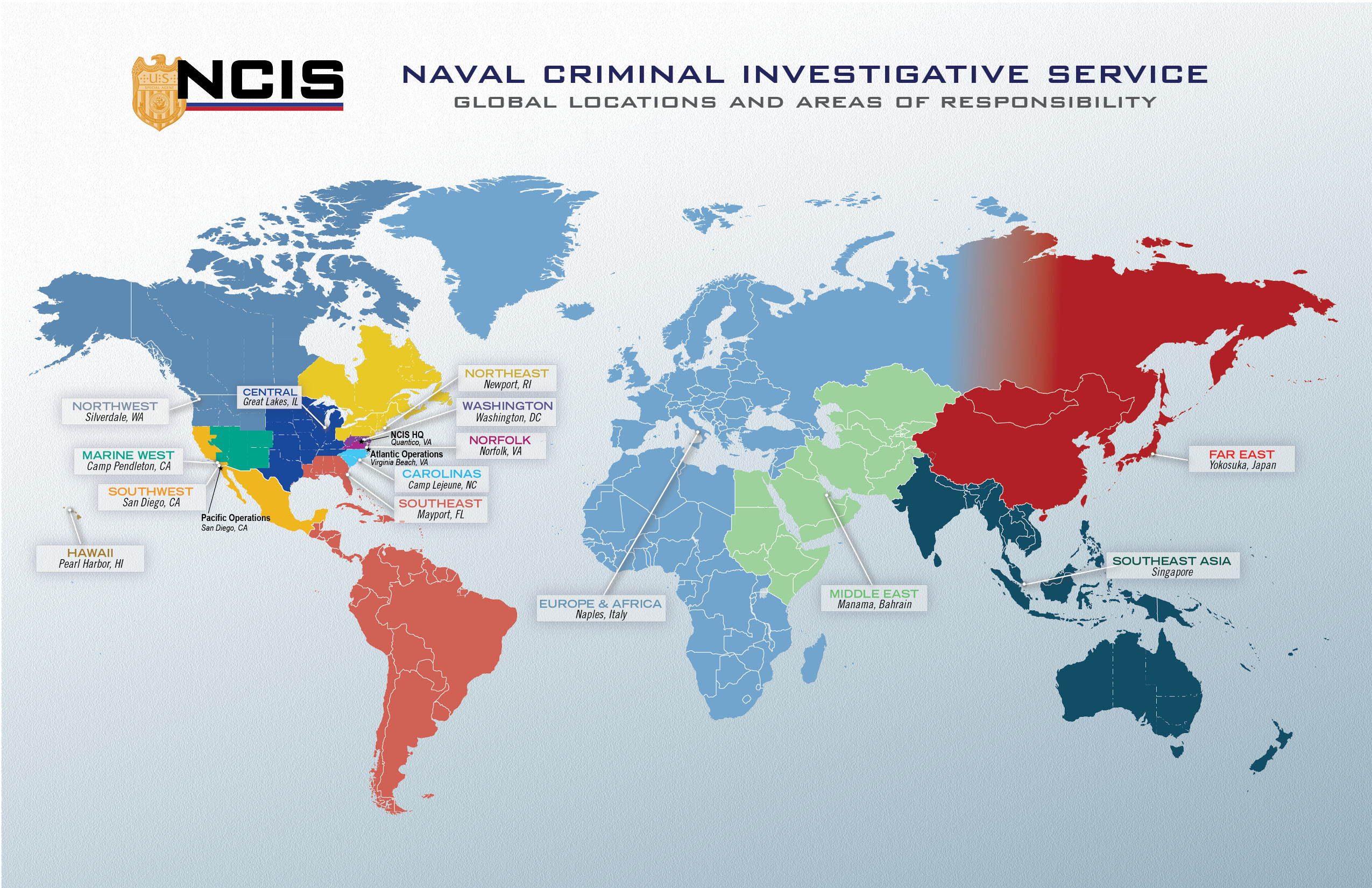
Map of all NCIS Field Offices and their areas of responsibility.

===== Atlantic Operations Directorate =====
The Atlantic Operations Directorate oversees all investigations and operations of NCIS field offices and numerous subordinate elements located throughout the Eastern United States, Europe, Africa, South America, the Middle East, and aboard carrier and expeditionary strike groups based on the East Coast.

The Atlantic Operations Directorate is currently headquartered aboard Naval Air Station Oceana in Virginia Beach, Virginia.

- Carolinas Field Office (CAFO) (Marine Corps Base Camp Lejeune, Jacksonville, North Carolina) – area of responsibility spans across North and South Carolina to provide support to Marine Corps and Navy installations throughout North and South Carolina.
- Central Field Office (CNFO) (Naval Station Great Lakes, Illinois) – area of responsibility spans across the Midwestern United States (excluding Ohio), and the states of Arkansas, Kentucky, Oklahoma, Tennessee, and Texas to provide support to Navy Regional Commands and accompanying operational efficiencies.
- Europe & Africa Field Office (EUFO) (Naval Support Activity Naples, Naples, Italy) – area of responsibility covers 35 countries within Africa Command and 51 countries within European Command, including major research and development sites, critical Department of the Navy logistics hubs, and multiple ballistic missile defense platforms and sites.
- Middle East Field Office (MEFO) (Naval Support Activity Bahrain, Bahrain) – area of responsibility encompasses more than 20 countries in the Middle East, southwest Asia, and eastern Africa.
- Norfolk Field Office (NFFO) (Naval Station Norfolk, Norfolk, Virginia) – area of responsibility spans encompasses the Commonwealth of Virginia, mainly to provide support to Navy and Marine Corps installations and Joint Forces Command in the Norfolk area.
- Northeast Field Office (NEFO) (Naval Station Newport, Newport, Rhode Island) – area of responsibility spans across the Northeastern United States (excluding West Virginia and Virginia), the State of Ohio, and the Canadian provinces of Ontario, Quebec, New Brunswick, Newfoundland & Labrador, Nova Scotia, and Prince Edward Island.
- Southeast Field Office (SEFO) (Naval Station Mayport, Jacksonville, Florida) – area of responsibility spans across the states of Alabama, Florida, Georgia, Louisiana, and Mississippi, down to the Caribbean and into Central and South America.
- Washington, D.C. Field Office (DCFO) (Joint Base Anacostia–Bolling, Washington, D.C.) – area of responsibility encompasses Delaware, the District of Columbia, Maryland, West Virginia, and 26 counties in Virginia.

===== Pacific Operations Directorate =====
The Pacific Operations Directorate oversees all investigations and operations of NCIS field offices and numerous subordinate elements located throughout the Western United States, Asia, Australia, and aboard aircraft carrier and expeditionary strike groups based on the west coast and throughout the Indo-Pacific region.

The Pacific Operations Directorate is currently headquartered aboard Naval Base San Diego in San Diego, California.

- Far East Field Office (FEFO) (Fleet Activities Yokosuka, Yokosuka, Japan) – area of responsibility spans across northeast Asia, including China, Japan, the Koreas, Mongolia, and eastern regions of the Russian Federation.
- Hawaii Field Office (HIFO) (Joint Base Pearl Harbor–Hickam, Honolulu, Hawaii) – area of responsibility spans across the State of Hawaii as well as Guam.
- Marine West Field Office (MWFO) (Marine Corps Base Camp Pendleton, California) – area of responsibility spans across the states of Nevada, Arizona, Utah, New Mexico, and Colorado, along with certain areas of the State of California (areas surrounding MCB Camp Pendleton, MCAS Miramar, and MCAGCC Twentynine Palms).
- Northwest Field Office (NWFO) (Naval Base Kitsap, Silverdale, Washington) – area of responsibility spans the Northwestern United States, as well as the Canadian provinces and territories of British Columbia, Alberta, Saskatchewan, Manitoba, Yukon, Northwest Territories, and Nunavut.
- Southeast Asia Field Office (SAFO) (Port of Sembawang, Singapore) – area of responsibility spans across the countries of India, Nepal, Bangladesh, Myanmar, Thailand, Laos, Cambodia, Vietnam, Malaysia, Singapore, Philippines, Indonesia, Papua New Guinea, and Australia.
- Southwest Field Office (SWFO) (Naval Base San Diego, San Diego, California) – area of responsibility spans across the State of California, parts of Nevada, and down to Mexico.

===== Behavioral Science Group =====
The Behavioral Science Group (BSG) supports the NCIS headquarters and field offices on a worldwide basis by deploying licensed psychologists with specialized training and experience in law enforcement psychology and national security. They are responsible for providing consultations to operations, investigations, and related projects and matters.

The BSG consultations provide insight into relevant behavior; optimizing criminal, counterintelligence, and counter-terrorism investigations and operations; and complementing other resources such as analytical and technical expertise.

===== Office of Military Support =====
The Office of Military Support (OMS) is composed of active duty and reserve US Navy officers and enlisted personnel. They perform in a variety of mission support areas in NCIS offices throughout the world, including protective service operations, supply and logistics, communications, administrative duties, intelligence, and security.

==== Support directorates ====
The support directorates of NCIS are supervised by the deputy director of operational support, responsible for cyber, intelligence, human resources, material, capital, fiscal, acquisition, administrative, and technology functions.

===== Cyber Directorate =====
The Cyber Directorate has program management oversight of worldwide law enforcement and counterintelligence cyberspace investigations, operations, and digital/multimedia forensics.

The Cyber Directorate is responsible for outlining the goals and objectives of NCIS relating to the cyber domain through the Program Direction Document. The executive assistant director exercises direction and supervision of the Program Direction Document through the three field directorates (Atlantic, Pacific, and Global). The EAD also advises the deputy director of operational support as well as the deputy director of operations on the three field directorate executive assistant directors' performance in meeting the outlined goals and objectives.

The Cyber Directorate is managed by an executive assistant director with the assistance of an assistant director. The directorate is divided into multiple programmatic departments which are headed by deputy assistant directors (comparable in practice to special agents in charge). The departments are further divided into divisions led by division chiefs (comparable in practice to assistant special agents in charge).

===== Enterprise Management Directorate =====
The Enterprise Management Directorate is managed by an executive assistant director who supervises five assistant directors, whose staff, in turn, manage the agency's portfolios for:

- Human Resources – responsible for all human resource aspects, including staffing, pay and entitlements, employee relations, policy development, and recruitment.
- Training and Workforce Development (includes the NCIS Training Academy) – responsible for classification, transfers, promotions, human capital and leadership development, performance management, and for all training matters and oversees the operation of the NCIS Academy at the U.S. Department of Homeland Security's Federal Law Enforcement Training Centers.
- Security, Facilities, Logistics, Policy, and Administration – responsible for directing the activities conducted by NCIS to enable the execution of its strategic mission, both in the short- and long-term, with facilities management, procurement management, logistics, and supply management, security management, records management, and administrative services support.
- Digital Business Directorate – responsible for directing the activities conducted by NCIS to plan, implement, and maintain the NCIS IT infrastructure necessary to accomplish the strategic mission of NCIS in the short- and long-term. The Directorate is also responsible for the effective use of NCIS information resources across the organization to successfully meet its goals and objectives and for NCIS business operations that enable the design, development, procurement, operation, and maintenance of NCIS information systems.
- Office of Strategic Communications.

===== Intelligence and Information Sharing Directorate =====
The Intelligence and Information Sharing Directorate directs NCIS' activities to provide intelligence, analysis, and related products to better understand the terror, intelligence, cyber, and criminal threats to the Department of the Navy and to meet priority intelligence requirements. The Directorate is also responsible for the collection, analysis, exploitation, and sharing of criminal, counterintelligence, and terrorism information in direct support of NCIS operations and investigations, along with directing NCIS' Multiple Threat Alert Center and the Department of Defense Global Watch.

The Intelligence and Information Sharing Directorate is managed by an executive assistant director with the assistance of an assistant director. The directorate is divided into multiple programmatic departments which are headed by deputy assistant directors (comparable in practice to special agents in charge). The departments are further divided into divisions led by division chiefs (comparable in practice to assistant special agents in charge).

===== Strategy, Planning and Business Operations Directorate =====
The Strategy, Planning, and Business Operations Directorate develops overarching agency strategies and provides the program planning, evaluation, and performance assessment necessary to accomplish the strategic mission of NCIS. The directorate also serves as a consultant to the Department of Defense and Department of the Navy sponsors on financial management and critical resource issues and manages public engagement and congressional activities.

The Planning and Strategy Directorate is managed by an executive assistant director with the assistance of an assistant director. The directorate is divided into multiple programmatic departments which are headed by deputy assistant directors (comparable in practice to special agents in charge). The departments are further divided into divisions led by division chiefs (comparable in practice to assistant special agents in charge).

== Specialized programs ==
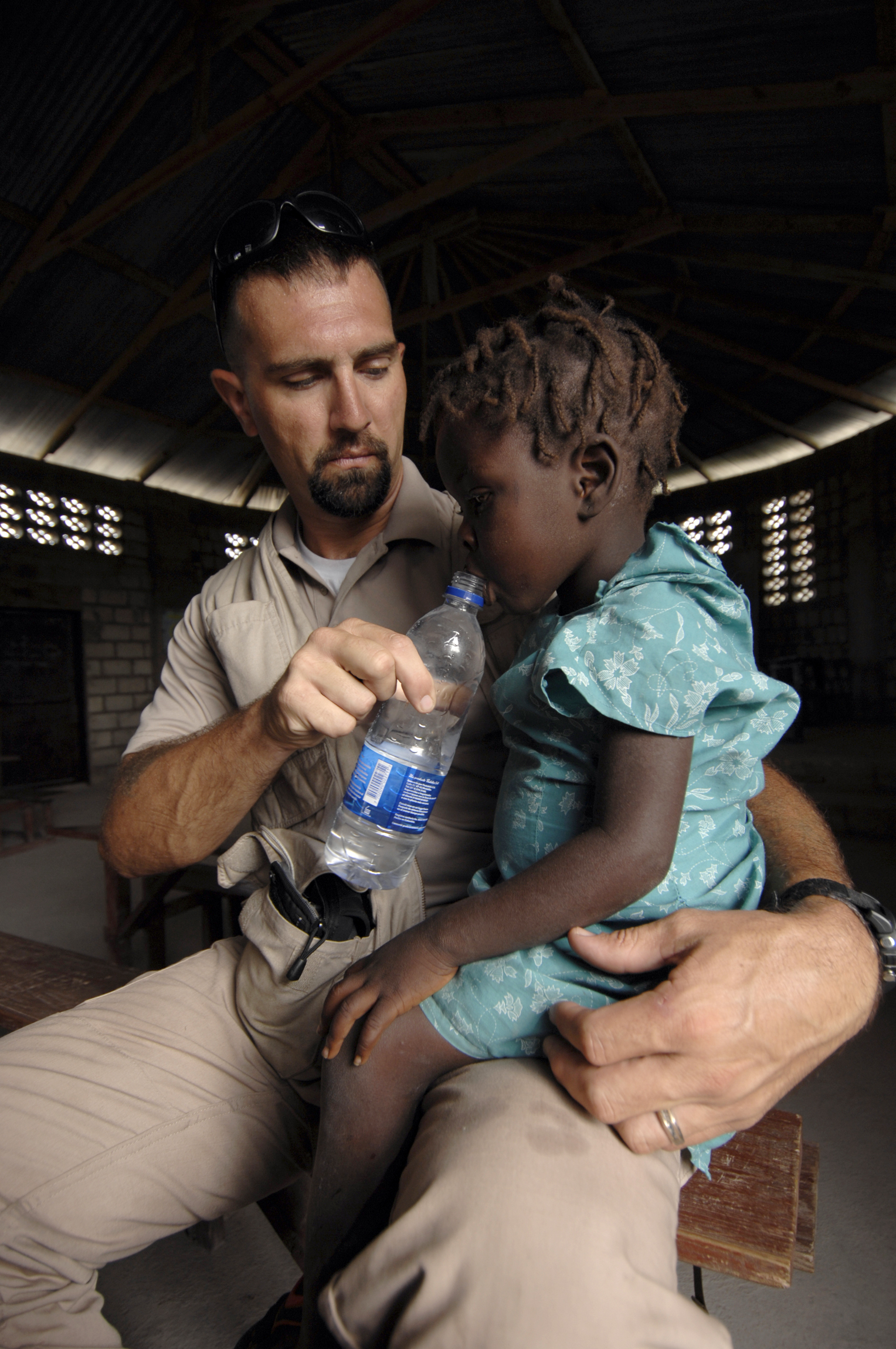
An NCIS special agent, assigned to the USS Kearsarge, gives a girl a drink of water during a medical assessment of a local village during hurricane relief operations in Haiti in 2008.

=== Special Agents Afloat ===
The Special Agent Afloat Program of NCIS sends NCIS Special Agents aboard U.S. aircraft carriers, submarines, and other ships (for example, hospital ships and amphibious assault ships). The purpose of the program is to provide professional investigative, counterintelligence, and force protection support to deployed Navy and Marine Corps commanders. These special agents are assigned to aircraft carriers and other deployed major combatants. Their environment can best be described as a "floating city." The assignment offers many of the same investigative challenges found by any criminal investigator working in a metropolitan city. A special agent assigned to a carrier must be skilled in general criminal investigations including crime scene examination, expert interview techniques, and the use of proactive law enforcement procedures to stop criminal activity before it occurs. The special agent afloat also provides guidance on foreign counterintelligence matters, including terrorism. It is also the mission of the special agent afloat to offer Navy and Marine Corps leadership advice and operational support on security issues that might threaten the safety of ships, personnel, and resources.

The Special Agent Afloat (SAA) program was initiated in Europe in March 1967. In April 1971, a special agent was assigned to a deployed carrier for six months with the designation of SAA. By 1978, SAA personnel were assigned to each operational aircraft carrier in the U. S. Navy for a one-year assignment. In 1986, a trial began where two Special Agents Afloat were assigned to aircraft carriers to determine the feasibility and effectiveness of having two agents assigned full-time while deployed, one focusing on law enforcement/criminal investigations and one on foreign counterintelligence. The trial was discontinued when no longer considered viable.

=== Protective operations ===
The Naval Criminal Investigative Service is the only entity within the Department of the Navy authorized to conduct protection of the Department of Defense/Department of the Navy (DOD/DON) High-Risk Billets (HRB). The mission of the NCIS Protective Operations Field Office (POFO) is to prevent terrorist and/or criminal attacks on principals under NCIS executive protection coverage and execute the necessary and appropriate response to a threat and/or attack on a principal. POFO will also initiate investigations on individuals and groups who meet a specific threshold when a threat is detected or needs to be validated.

NCIS provides and manages full-time protection details on key Department of the Navy personnel, including:

- Secretary of the Navy
- Chief of Naval Operations
- Commandant of the Marine Corps

To supplement POFO's operational mission, it maintains an internal Protective Intelligence Unit (PIU) to identify potential threats that could affect a principal, understand a principal's level of vulnerability to any given threat, and use available intelligence to mitigate threats and/or risks to a principal. The Protective Intelligence Unit works extensively with the U.S. Secret Service, Pentagon Force Protection Agency, U.S. Army Criminal Investigation Division, Department of the Air Force Office of Special Investigations, and the U.S. Marshals Service.

=== Multiple Threat Alert Center ===
The Multiple Threat Alert Center (MTAC) utilizes NCIS' worldwide presence and combination of law enforcement, counterintelligence, intelligence and security capabilities to identify a wide range of threats to Navy and Marine Corps personnel and assets around the world. The MTAC is a platform in that it merges intelligence from other agencies with information from NCIS source networks and law enforcement activities worldwide to provide the most relevant operational support to the Navy and Marine Corps commanders.

=== Regional Enforcement Action Capabilities Team ===
In 2014, in the aftermath of the Washington Navy Yard shooting, NCIS formed the Regional Enforcement Action Capabilities Training (REACT) team. The team was renamed the Regional Enforcement Action Capabilities Team (REACT) around 2020. REACT teams are designed to support investigations and "high-risk" enforcement operations within the United States, including high-risk operations that involve the service of arrest and search warrants, undercover agent and source protection/rescue, undercover operations, high-risk surveillance, and high-risk protective assignments.

REACT is organized, equipped, directed, and controlled by the deputy assistant director of, the Criminal Investigations and Operations Department, Criminal Operations Directorate, and is under the direction of the REACT commander and deputy commander. Because of NCIS' changing needs and mobility, realignments of field offices, and geographical differences, the composition of each team may vary. In general, each REACT team is composed of one team leader (TL), one assistant team leader (ATL), and multiple tactical operators. Assignment to REACT is strictly voluntary and REACT is classified as a collateral duty, meaning Special Agents assigned to REACT remain in their original assignments within the field office when not called into service with REACT.

If REACT assistance is determined to be necessary, the field office SAC or his/her designee will contact the REACT commander, or deputy commander if the commander is unavailable, for further discussion and evaluation. The deputy assistant director of criminal investigations and operations maintains final approval authority for the use of REACT and the execution of a proposed operation.

=== Major Case Response Team ===
The Major Case Response Team (MCRT) is tasked with processing crime scenes and collecting evidence. They collect fingerprints and biological traces, impressions, and other evidence, as well as photograph the scene and make sketches of important details. There are 27 deployable MCRTs stationed around the world. They respond to death scenes and assist with the investigation of many other high-impact crimes, including sexual and/or aggravated assaults, acts of arson and wrongful destruction, and thefts. MCRT members also relieve the case agents (special agents assigned to lead investigations in the field) of crime scene responsibilities by conducting complex searches, attending autopsies, and performing other duties related to their areas of specialized training.

Even though all special agents possess the requisite skills for proper crime scene investigation after attending the mandatory Special Agent Basic Training Program, the MCRT was developed as a concept to lend a professional approach to crime scene processing. Special agents from all disciplines are trained in additional crime scene processing techniques and are called out on major incidents to search, locate, photograph, document, collect, and preserve physical evidence.

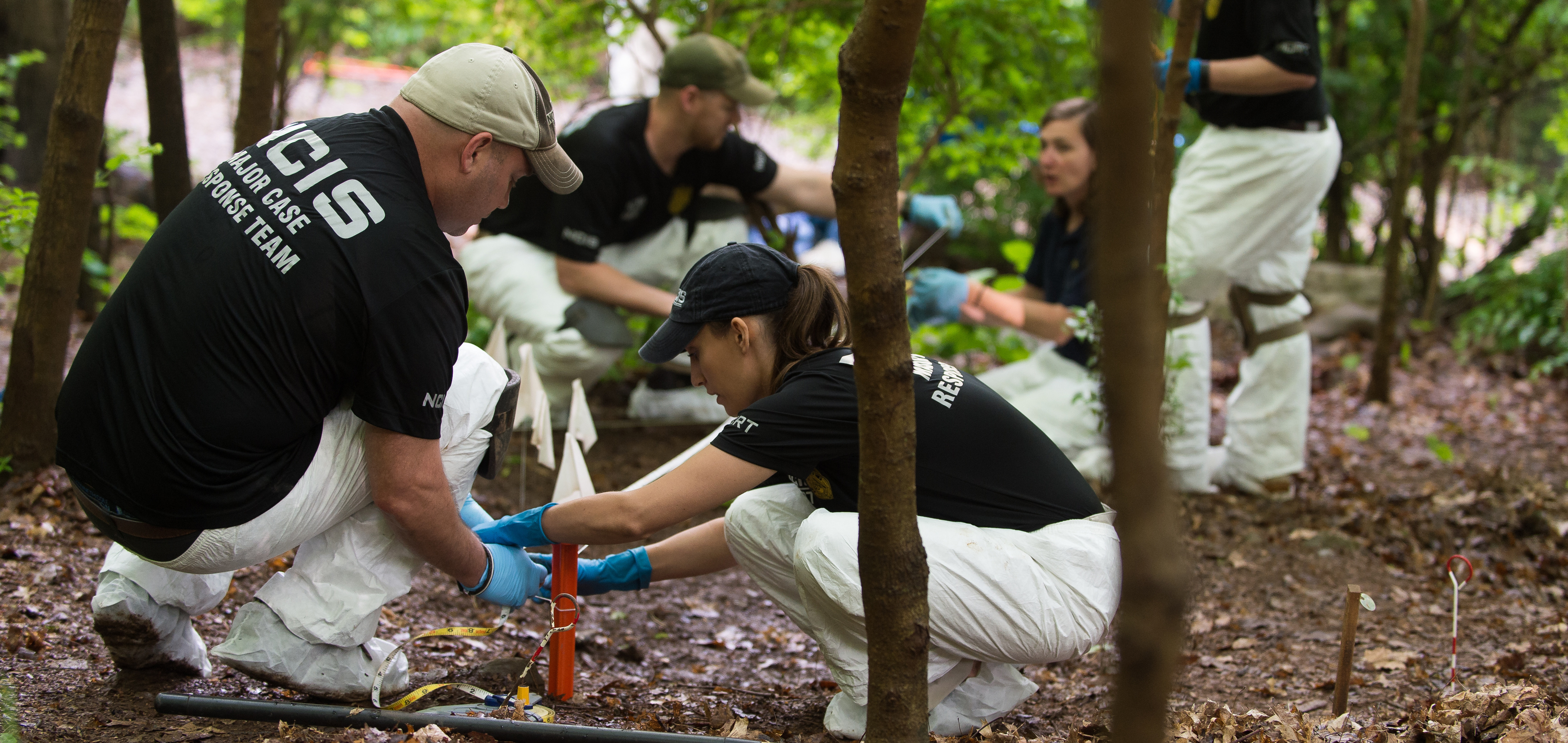
NCIS Major Case Response Team in training

=== Office of the Inspector General ===
The NCIS Office of the Inspector General (OIG) investigates allegations of waste, fraud, abuse, mismanagement, and misconduct by NCIS personnel. The OIG is headed by an Inspector General (IG) who serves at the pay grade of GS-15 or higher, and is appointed with the concurrence of the Naval Inspector General and reports directly to the Director of NCIS. The Inspector General also serves additional duties on the staff of the Naval Inspector General. The NCIS Inspector General is assisted by the NCIS Deputy Inspector General.

The IG directs the development of NCIS inspection, compliance oversight, and employee misconduct investigative priorities and performance requirements. They advise the Director and deputy directors on personnel and personnel-related decisions including, but not limited to: promotions, transfers, and awards nominations; issuance of non-police badges; and issuance of firearms authorization and firearms to non-agent personnel. The IG keeps the Director, deputy directors, and other NCIS executives informed on all matters about NCIS component performance evaluation, regulatory compliance, and personnel integrity.

- Internal Personnel Investigations — conducts official inquiries into allegations of personnel misconduct when the actions of special agents or other personnel involve breaches of NCIS policy or doctrine, violations of criminal law, or are of such nature to bring serious discredit on NCIS or the United States Navy.
- Inspections — the NCIS inspection program will primarily focus on the core functions of investigations, operations, and related support activities. The objectives of NCIS inspections are to: assess leadership, assess the quality of investigative and operational activity, assess the effectiveness and efficiency of NCIS components, assess staffing levels, assess the quality and management of available resources, assess compliance with established policies and procedures, evaluate anomalies which prevent or inhibit compliance to established policies and procedures, and develop appropriate recommendations to correct deficiencies.
- Field Office/Departmental Inspections — field office Special Agents in Charge and departmental Deputy Assistant Directors are responsible for mission accomplishment and monitoring the quality and timeliness of NCIS investigations and operations. Each field office component and headquarters department is required to conduct a self-inspection each year and report the results to the OIG. The Self-Inspection Program provides the Director the annual assurances that field operations comply with DoD, DON, and NCIS policies, directives, and regulations.
- Intelligence Oversight Program — assurance that all NCIS intelligence activities, operations, and programs function in compliance with applicable U.S. law, statute, directive, and policy to protect a person's rights and privacy from intrusion by intelligence activities and agencies. Within each NCIS field office, the ASAC with responsibility for the Counterintelligence Program is designated as the Field Office Intelligence Oversight Officer. Within each NCISRA, the SSA is designated as the Unit Intelligence Oversight Officer. Intelligence Oversight Officers are responsible for ensuring required training is completed, answering employees' questions regarding authorized activities, and forwarding reports of questionable activity to the NCIS IG. A questionable intelligence activity may violate the law, any Executive Order, Presidential directive, or applicable DoD policy. Examples of questionable intelligence activity include, but are not limited to: alleged abuse and mistreatment of detainees and prisoners by or directed by intelligence personnel; tasking intelligence personnel to conduct intelligence activities that are not part of the organization's approved mission, even if they have the technical capability to do so; providing intelligence services and/or products without proper authorization; and collecting information on U.S. persons, even though open source, when it is not part of the unit's mission.

== Personnel ==
=== Executive command staff ===
- Director – Omar R. Lopez
  - Deputy Director of Operations – Gregory A. Scovel Jr.
  - Deputy Director of Operational Support – Erin Carmichael
    - Executive Assistant Director, Strategy, Planning and Business Operations – Bethann M. Sliwa
    - Executive Assistant Director, Intelligence and Information Sharing – Megan C. Bolduc
    - Acting Executive Assistant Director, Criminal Investigations and Operations – Dan Simpson
    - Acting Executive Assistant Director, Atlantic Operations – Clifton J. Everton III
    - Acting Executive Assistant Director, Pacific Operations – Brad Duckworth
    - Acting Executive Assistant Director, Global Operations - Erin Carmichael
    - Acting Executive Assistant Director, National Security – Wesley Berry
    - Acting Executive Assistant Director, Cyber - Richard Dunwoodie
    - Acting Executive Assistant Director, Enterprise Management – Laukik Suthar
    - Acting Executive Assistant Director, AUKUS & RDA - Caroline Colvin

=== Special Agent Career Program ===
==== Qualifications ====
The qualifications to be an NCIS special agent are:

- Must not have reached 37 years of age (exceptions are preference-eligible veterans and those currently covered under the 6C Federal Law Enforcement retirement system).
- Must have vision correctable to 20/20 with normal color vision.
- Must be a U.S.-born or naturalized U.S. citizen.
- Must have a valid driver's license.
- Must pass a background check.
- Must pass a polygraph examination.
- Must be able to obtain and maintain a top-secret clearance.

==== Training ====
New special agents must complete the Criminal Investigators Training Program (CITP) and the NCIS-specific Special Agent Basic Training Program (SABTP) at the NCIS Training Academy aboard the U.S. Department of Homeland Security's Federal Law Enforcement Training Centers (FLETC). The training provides instruction on the NCIS report writing system, manuals, and field training exercises. All newly hired agents who have not experienced active or reserve duty with the Navy or Marine Corps must also complete the Naval Orientation Correspondence Course. The Special Agent Career Program includes four investigative specialties (General Crimes, Fraud, Combating Terrorism, and Foreign Counterintelligence) and four technical specialties (Technical Services, Cyber, Forensics and Polygraph).

After completing the training programs, Special Agents enter the trial period, formerly referred to as a "probationary" period, which is (usually) the first two years of a Special Agent's employment. The successful completion of the special agent trial period requires graduation from the CITP and SABTP and the successful completion of all phases included in the Special Agent Basic Training Program (SABTP). The phases are:

- Phase I – Pre-Basic Special Agent Orientation at the NCIS Field Office or Headquarters department before formal training at the FLETC.
- Phase II – Formal training at FLETC to include both the CITP and the SABTP.
- Phase III – On-the-job training.
- Phase IV – Final evaluation of casework and abilities. Upon completion of Phase III, an evaluation will be made on whether the Training Agent (TA) should remain in Phase III mode or move into Phase IV. Phase IV begins if the TA completes all the skill requirements and all evaluations are at an acceptable level. Phase IV lasts until the successful completion of the trial period.

== Weapons ==
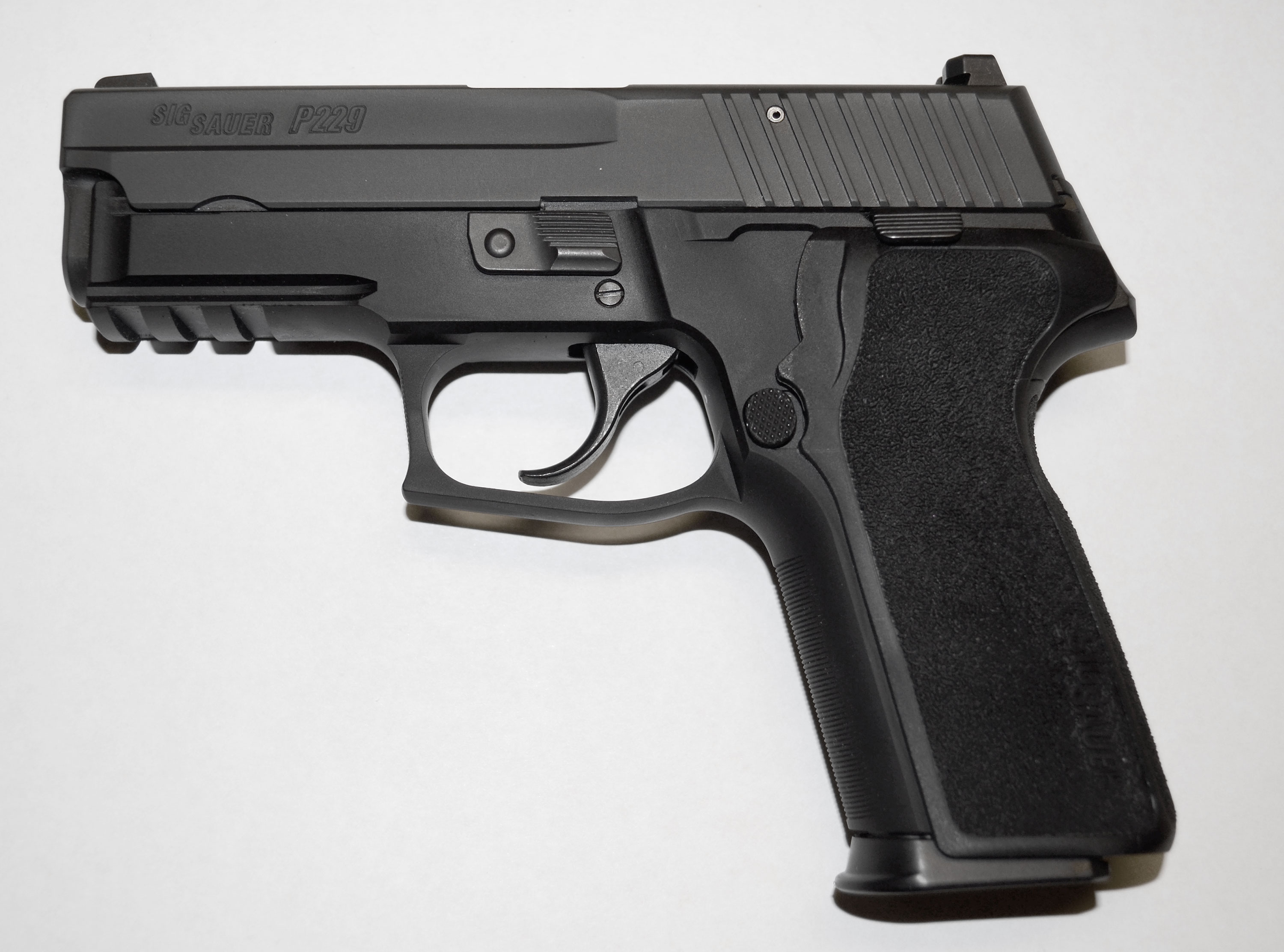
SIG Sauer P229 DAK

As of 2021, the current standard issue pistols of NCIS Academy graduates are the Glock 47 MOS, Glock 19 MOS, and the Glock 26 in 9mm. Previously, NCIS issued both the Sig Sauer P229/P239 DA/SA, DAK (Double Action Kellerman) trigger system. and SIG Sauer M11 (P228) in 9×19mm. Agents may also qualify with a weapon from an approved list of manufacturers in .38 Special, 9×19mm, .40 S&W, or .45 ACP.

Field offices are issued several Mossberg 500 or Remington 870 shotguns in 12 Gauge and the M4 or MK 18 platform for use when appropriate. For combat environments, special agents are issued by the U.S. Navy MK18.

== In popular culture ==
Television

- In 2003, the series NCIS began as a spin-off of JAG and features a fictional representation of the Major Case Response Team, consisting of a team of NCIS agents based at Washington Navy Yard in Washington, D.C. David Brant and Thomas Betro, two former directors of NCIS, both had minor cameo appearances in the series during their respective tenures as director. Director Omar Lopez was featured in a cameo role in episode 20 of season 17 which aired on April 14, 2020.
  - In 2009, that series spun off NCIS: Los Angeles, featuring a fictional representation of the Office of Special Projects, based in Los Angeles that specializes in undercover assignments. Former NCIS Director Mark D. Clookie had a minor cameo appearance in the third season of the series, appearing as "NCIS Special Agent Clookie". Andrew Traver (fifth Director of NCIS) also had a minor appearance in the seventh season of the series, appearing as "NCIS Special Agent Gates".
  - A second spin-off set in a small NCIS Resident Agency in New Orleans (part of the Southeast Field Office), NCIS: New Orleans, started in 2014 and concluded in 2021.
  - A third spin-off began in 2021, NCIS: Hawaiʻi, set in the Hawaii Field Office.
  - A fourth spin-off, NCIS: Sydney, set in the Australian city of Sydney, premiered in 2023.
  - A fifth spin-off, NCIS: Origins premiered in 2024 and is a prequel to the original series, starting in 1991, and focusing on the early investigative career of the show's original protagonist Leroy Jethro Gibbs centering around his years as a Probationary NIS Agent.
- The Pentagon Channel aired a documentary in June 2009 entitled Recon: Military CSI about crime scene investigation techniques used in the theater of war by NCIS special agents.
- The National Geographic Channel filmed a documentary entitled Inside the Real NCIS.
- Investigation Discovery filmed a 13-episode series called The Real NCIS highlighting thirteen different crimes solved by NCIS special agents.
- In 2017, CBS began airing 48 Hours: NCIS, an extension of the 48 Hours investigative program focused on real-life NCIS cases, and narrated by Rocky Carroll of NCIS.

Film

- The 1992 film A Few Good Men features a NIS investigation as a key element of the murder trial which makes up the plot of the film.
- The 2000 film Dangerous Evidence: The Lori Jackson Story is based on the 1995 best-selling book Dangerous Evidence. The book recounts the true story of NIS agents accused of framing an African-American Marine corporal for a crime he did not commit. CBS News journalist Ellis A. Cohen covered the story for 60 Minutes and then wrote the book and produced the Lifetime movie.

Books

- In Richard Marcinko's book Rogue Warrior, he details his conflict with NIS. Later, an NIS investigation named "Iron Eagle" would result in a federal prison sentence.
- Special Agent, Vietnam: A Naval Intelligence Memoir was written by former Special Agent Douglass H. Hubbard about special agents during the Vietnam War. Hubbard served as an NIS special agent in Vietnam from 1969 to 1972.
- Author Mel Odom authored an NCIS series of novels entitled Paid in Blood, Blood Evidence, and Bloodlines.
- The Crisis: A Dan Lenson Novel by David Poyer details the adventures of NCIS special agents in the Horn of Africa (HOA).
- Capturing Jonathan Pollard: How One of the Most Notorious Spies in American History Was Brought to Justice was published in 2006. Written by retired NCIS Special Agent Ron Olive, it recounts the NIS investigation of Pollard.
- The Smack Track, by Ian McPhedran, is about how the Royal Australian Navy battles pirates, gun runners, and drug smugglers in the seas of the Persian Gulf and the Horn of Africa along the infamous route known as the 'smack track'. Since about 2010, NCIS special agents have been routinely assigned as law enforcement advisors afloat to serve alongside the Australian sailors looking for contraband.
- Dick Tracy is a U.S. comic strip featuring a tough and intelligent police detective created by Chester Gould. In a prose novel by Max Allan Collins based on the strip, Dick Tracy Goes to War, Tracy accepts a direct commission as a Lieutenant Commander in the U.S. Naval Reserve and to go on active duty as an Agent of the Office of Naval Intelligence, the precursor to NCIS. In the comic strip, as detailed in the 1944 sequence pitting Tracy against an Axis spy Alfred "The Brow" Brau, Tracy is commissioned into the same position with ONI but holds the rank of Lieutenant
- The Tom Sweterlitsch novel The Gone World features an NCIS investigator trying to avert a future global apocalypse. Neill Blomkamp confirmed he is developing a film adaptation with 20th Century Studios.

== See also ==
=== Military criminal investigative organizations ===
- Defense Criminal Investigative Service (DCIS)
- Department of the Air Force Office of Special Investigations (OSI)
- United States Army Counterintelligence (ACI)
- United States Army Criminal Investigation Division (USACID or CID)
- United States Marine Corps Criminal Investigation Division (USMCCID)
- Coast Guard Investigative Service (CGIS)

=== Federal law enforcement ===
- List of United States federal law enforcement agencies
- Master-at-arms (United States Navy)
- Shore Patrol (USN and USMC)
- Criminal Investigation Task Force (CITF)
- Military police
- National Oceanic and Atmospheric Administration Fisheries Office of Law Enforcement (NOAA OLE)
- Special agent
- U.S. Coast Guard
- U.S. Diplomatic Security Service (DSS), State Department

=== JAG Corps ===
- Judge Advocate General's Corps, U.S. Navy
- U.S. Marine Corps Judge Advocate Division

=== Intelligence ===
- Marine Corps Intelligence Activity
- Marine Corps Counterintelligence
- Office of Naval Intelligence (ONI)
- United States Army Counterintelligence (ACI)
- United States Army Intelligence and Security Command (INSCOM)
- Coast Guard Intelligence (CGI)
