= Hispanic American Police Command Officers Association =

U.S. law enforcement association

The Hispanic American Police Command Officers Association (HAPCOA) is a U.S. law enforcement association founded in California in 1973. It focuses on recruiting Hispanic and Latino Americans and social issues including gang violence.

By August 1998, there were seven chapters and over five-hundred members. In November that year, Drug Enforcement Administration special agent Errol Chavez was elected president. In 2001, Michele Vidal of New Jersey became HAPCOA's first female board member. Yessyka Santana of the New York chapter was the first female chapter president.
