= List of Doctor Who episodes (2005–2025) =

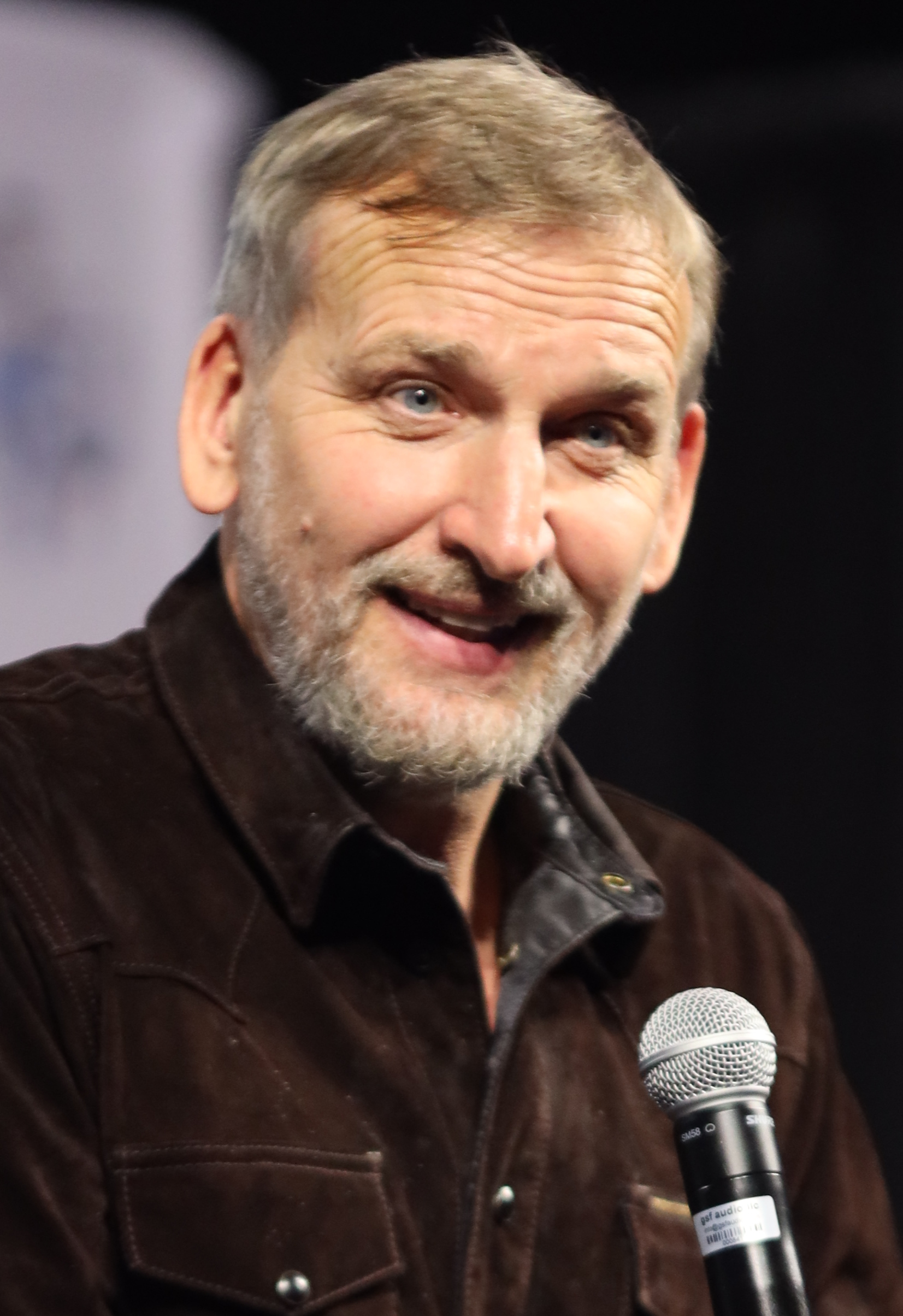
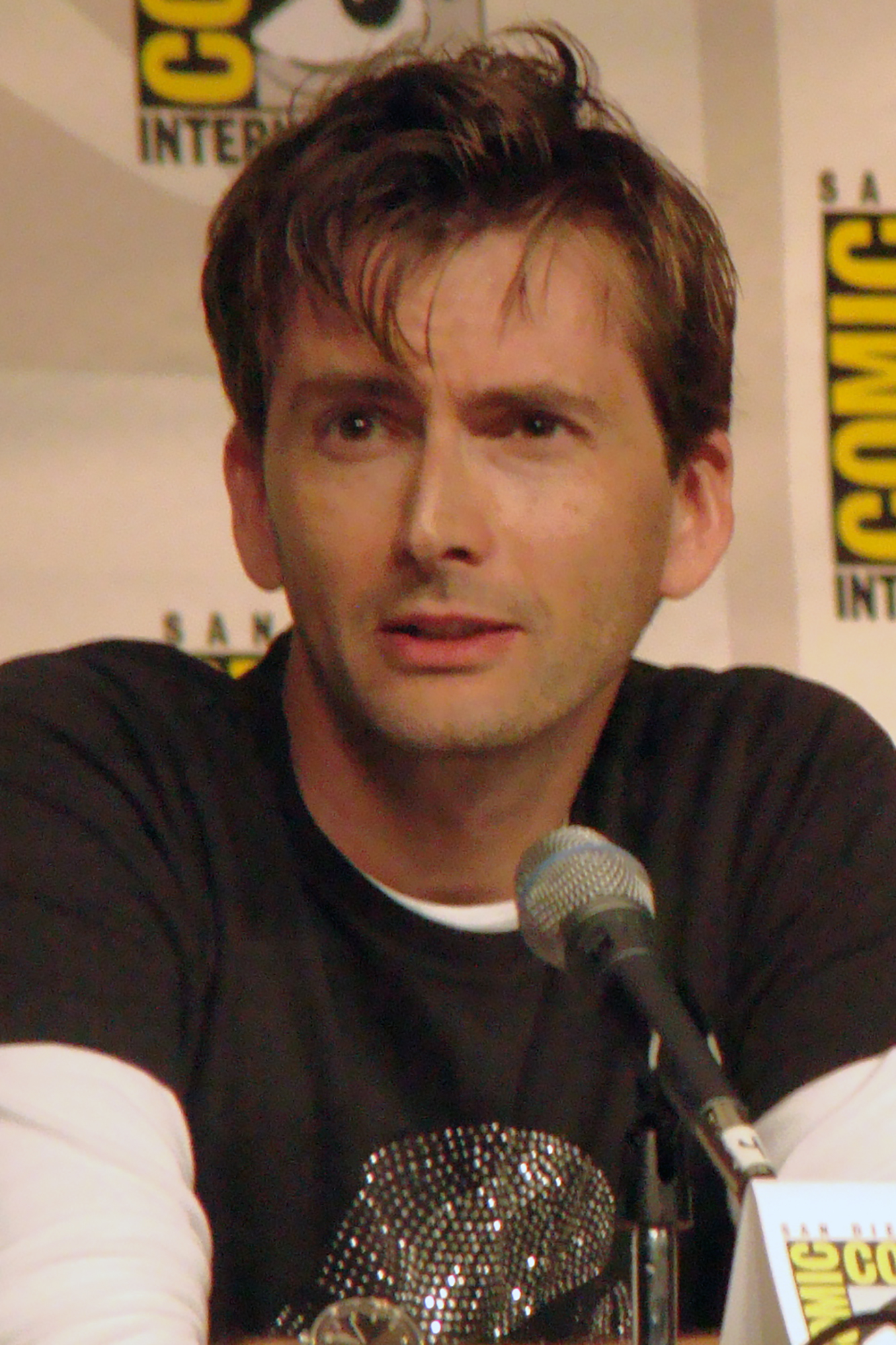
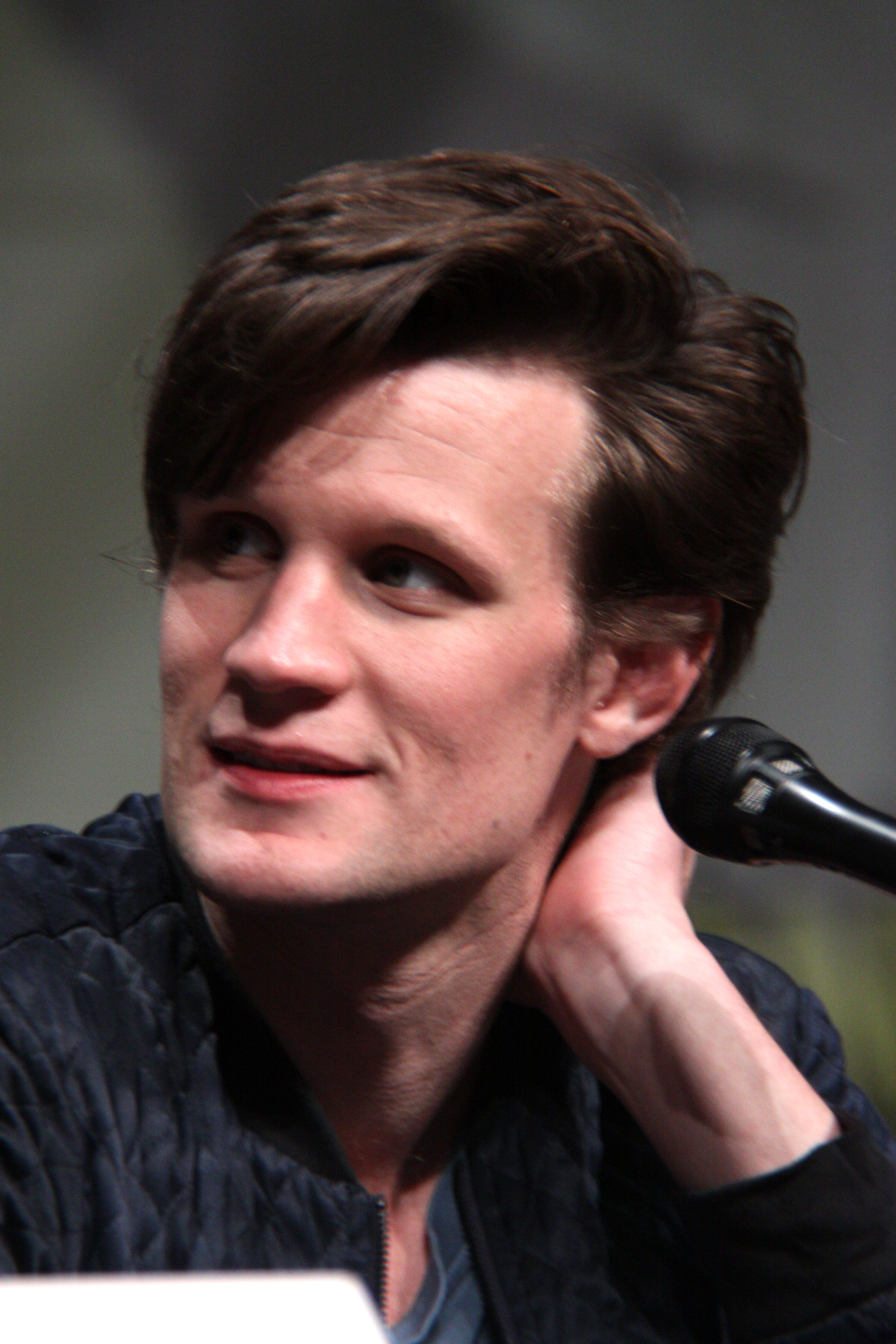
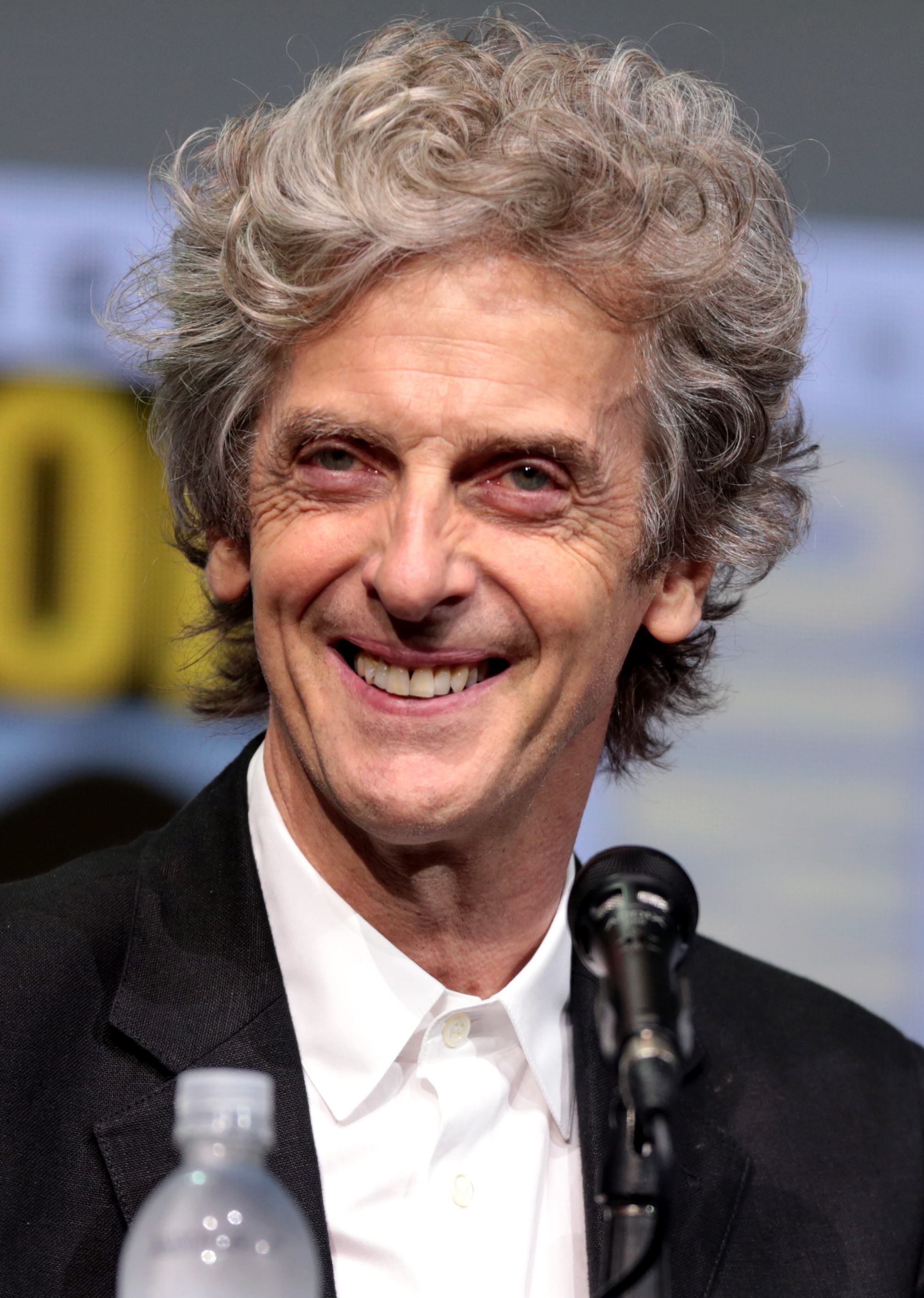
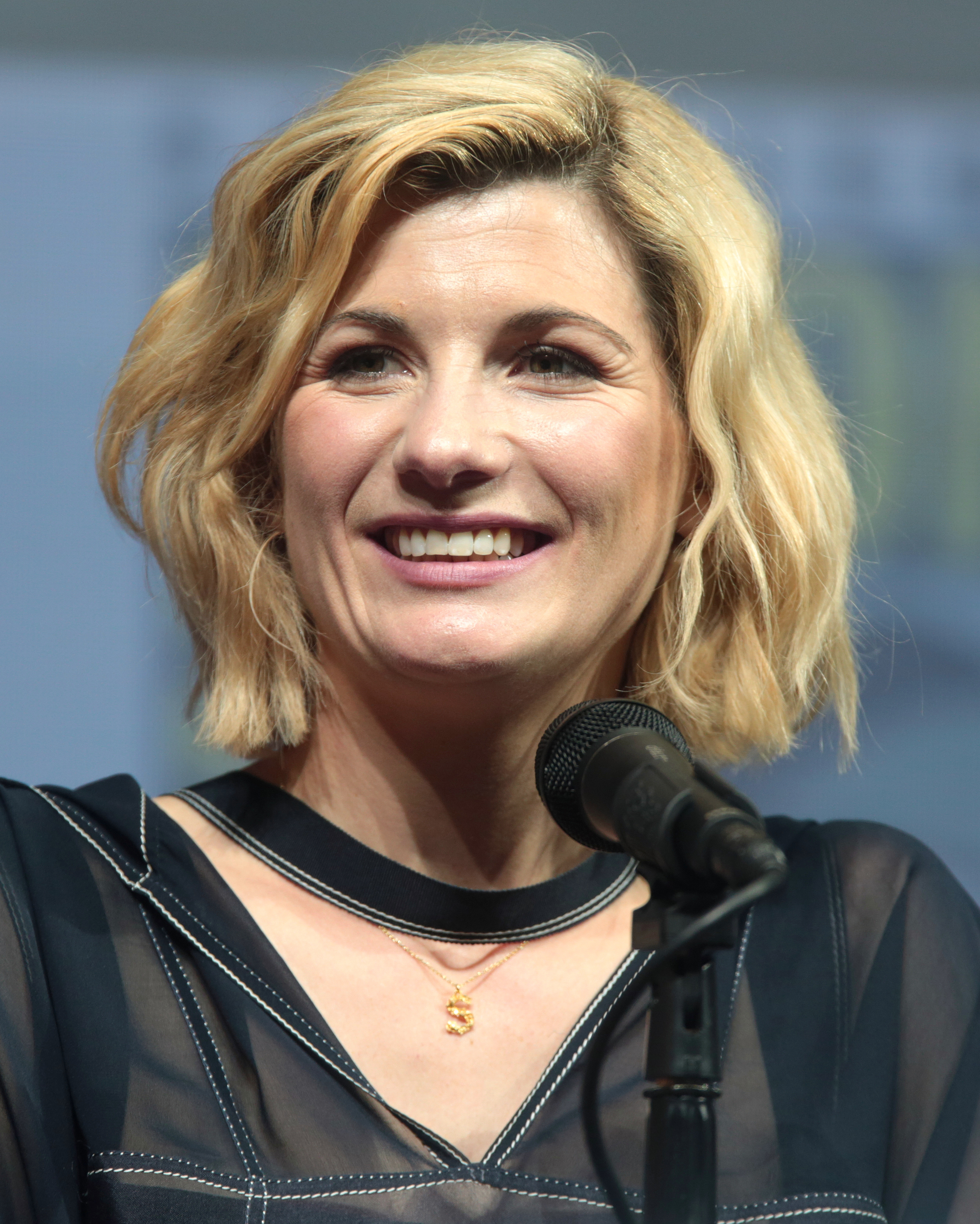
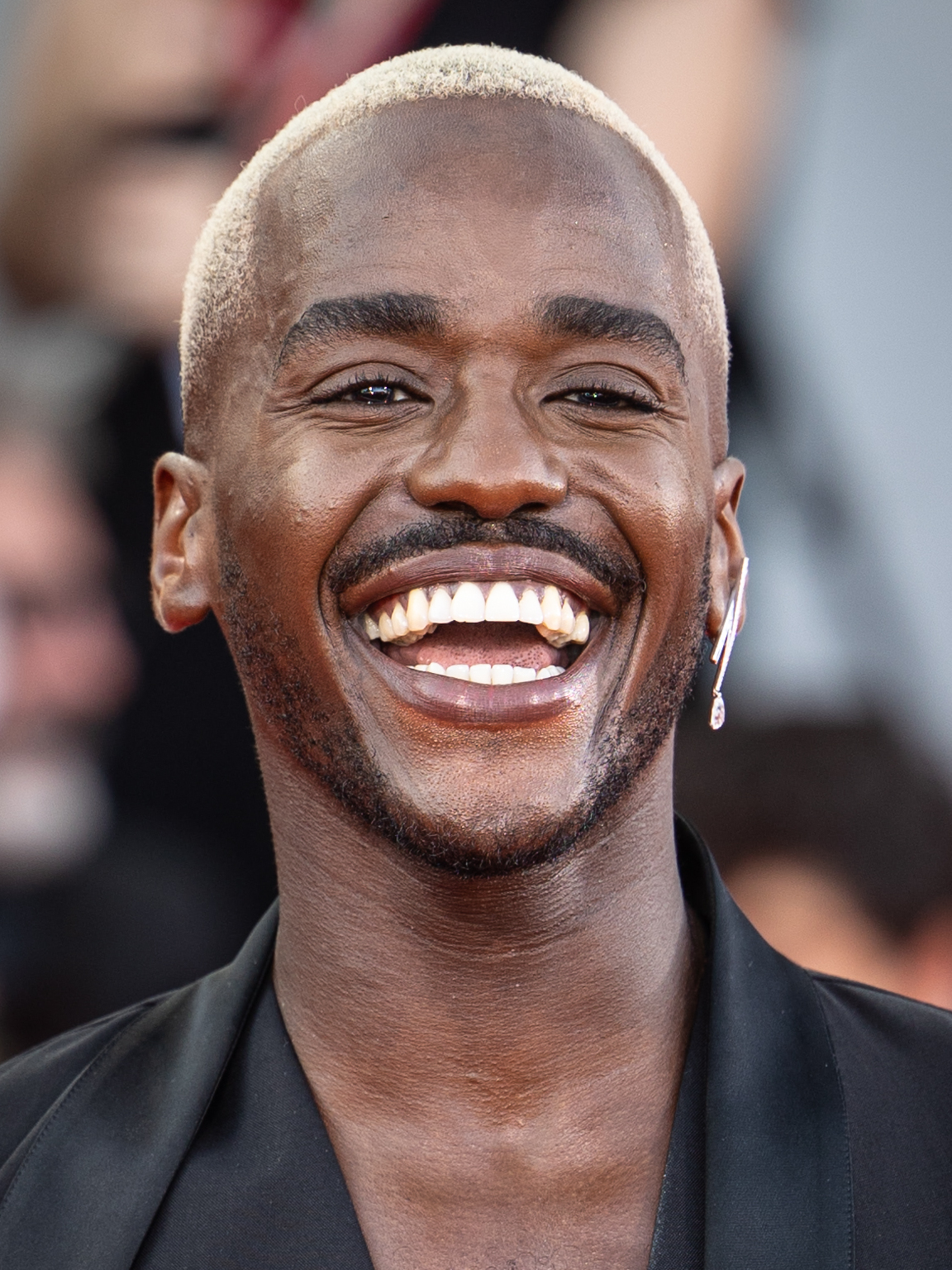
Six actors have led the revived era of Doctor Who. Top: Christopher Eccleston, David Tennant, Matt Smith. Bottom: Peter Capaldi, Jodie Whittaker, Ncuti Gatwa.

Doctor Who is a British science fiction television programme produced by the BBC. Having ceased broadcasting in 1989, it resumed in 2005. The 2005 revival traded the earlier multi-episode serial format of the original series for a run of self-contained episodes, interspersed with occasional multi-part stories and structured into loose story arcs.

Doctor Who depicts the adventures of an extraterrestrial being called the Doctor, part of a humanoid species called Time Lords. The Doctor travels in the universe and in time using a time travelling spaceship called the TARDIS, which externally appears as a British police box. While travelling, typically with companions, the Doctor works to save lives and liberate oppressed peoples by combating various enemies. The Doctor has been played by various actors; the transition between actors is written into the plot with the concept of regeneration, a plot device in which a Time Lord's cells regenerated when they are fatally injured or weakened from old age and they are reincarnated into a different body. Each actor's distinct portrayal represents different stages in the Doctor's life and, together, they form a single lifetime and narrative.

Six actors have led the revived series in the role of the Doctor under three showrunners, beginning with Christopher Eccleston as the Ninth Doctor and Russell T Davies as showrunner. Eccleston departed the role after the first series, succeeded by David Tennant as the Tenth Doctor, who played the role for three regular series. Tennant and Davies departed following a series of specials, replaced by Matt Smith as the Eleventh Doctor and Steven Moffat as showrunner, respectively. Smith portrayed the character for three series, leaving after the 2013 specials. Peter Capaldi took over the role for three series as the Twelfth Doctor; he and Moffat departed following the 2017 Christmas special. Capaldi was replaced by Jodie Whittaker, the first woman to play the role, as the Thirteenth Doctor; Chris Chibnall became showrunner. After three series, Whittaker and Chibnall left at the end of the 2022 specials, and Davies returned for a second term as showrunner. Tennant returned as the Fourteenth Doctor in the 60th anniversary specials, succeeded by Ncuti Gatwa, who headlined the series as the Fifteenth Doctor from 2023 to 2025. At the end of the fifteenth series in 2025, Gatwa's second series in the role, the Fifteenth Doctor regenerated into a form resembling Rose Tyler, portrayed by Billie Piper, and Davies departed. The programme was put out to competitive tender in 2026.

As of 31 May 2025, 892 episodes of Doctor Who have aired. This includes one television movie and multiple specials, and encompasses 319 stories over 41 seasons, starting in 1963; out of these, 196 are from the revived series, encompassing 163 stories over 15 series and various specials. The programme's high episode count has resulted in Doctor Who holding the world record for the highest number of episodes of a science-fiction programme. The story numbers below are meant as a guide to placement in the overall context of the programme. The numbering scheme in this list follows the official website's episode guide; other sources sometimes diverge in their numbering.

== Series overview ==
The following table dictates the season or series in question for the programme as a whole. The numbering system present is the same one used by the BBC; other sources may have alternate numbering.

=== Regular seasons ===
Season / Series	Era	Doctor	Episodes	Stories	Originally released (UK)		Average viewers (millions)	Average AI
Season / Series	Era	Doctor	Episodes	Stories	First released	Last released	Average viewers (millions)	Average AI
Season 1	Classic era	First Doctor	42	8	23 November 1963	12 September 1964	8.08	59
Season 2	Classic era	First Doctor	39	9	31 October 1964	24 July 1965	10.46	54
Season 3	Classic era	First Doctor	45	10	11 September 1965	16 July 1966	7.65	49
Season 4 (Note: The First Doctor remained for the first two serials of season 4. The Second Doctor featured for the remainder of the season from the third serial, The Power of the Daleks.)	Classic era	Second Doctor	43	9	10 September 1966	1 July 1967	7.10	49
Season 5	Classic era	Second Doctor	40	7	2 September 1967	1 June 1968	7.23	53
Season 6	Classic era	Second Doctor	44	7	10 August 1968	21 June 1969	6.38	54
Season 7	Classic era	Third Doctor	25	4	3 January 1970	20 June 1970	7.17	59
Season 8	Classic era	Third Doctor	25	5	2 January 1971	19 June 1971	7.96	–
Season 9	Classic era	Third Doctor	26	5	1 January 1972	24 June 1972	8.30	–
Season 10	Classic era	Third Doctor	26	5	30 December 1972	23 June 1973	8.87	–
Season 11	Classic era	Third Doctor	26	5	15 December 1973	8 June 1974	8.78	60
Season 12	Classic era	Fourth Doctor	20	5	28 December 1974	10 May 1975	10.00	56
Season 13	Classic era	Fourth Doctor	26	6	30 August 1975	6 March 1976	10.14	57
Season 14	Classic era	Fourth Doctor	26	6	4 September 1976	2 April 1977	11.08	59
Season 15	Classic era	Fourth Doctor	26	6	3 September 1977	11 March 1978	8.98	62
Season 16 (Note: Also known by its subtitle, The Key to Time)	Classic era	Fourth Doctor	26	6	2 September 1978	24 February 1979	8.61	64
Season 17	Classic era	Fourth Doctor	20	5 (Note: Shada was left unfinished due to a strike. The story was later completed and officially released on home media in 2017. It is not included in the episode or story counts as it was not broadcast.)	1 September 1979	12 January 1980	11.21	65
Season 18	Classic era	Fourth Doctor	28	7	30 August 1980	21 March 1981	5.82	63
Season 19	Classic era	Fifth Doctor	26	7	4 January 1982	30 March 1982	9.24	–
Season 20	Classic era	Fifth Doctor	22	6	3 January 1983	16 March 1983	7.03	67
Season 21 (Note: The Fifth Doctor regenerated in the sixth serial of season 21. The Sixth Doctor featured only in the final serial, The Twin Dilemma.)	Classic era	Fifth Doctor	24	7	5 January 1984	30 March 1984	7.14	65
Season 22	Classic era	Sixth Doctor	13	6	5 January 1985	30 March 1985	7.12	64
Season 23 (Note: Also known by its subtitle, The Trial of a Time Lord)	Classic era	Sixth Doctor	14	1	6 September 1986	6 December 1986	4.81	69
Season 24	Classic era	Seventh Doctor	14	4	7 September 1987	7 December 1987	4.94	60
Season 25	Classic era	Seventh Doctor	14	4	5 October 1988	4 January 1989	5.34	68
Season 26	Classic era	Seventh Doctor	14	4	6 September 1989	6 December 1989	4.15	68
Series 1	Revived era	Ninth Doctor	13	10	26 March 2005	18 June 2005	7.95	82
Series 2	Revived era	Tenth Doctor	13	10	15 April 2006	8 July 2006	7.71	84
Series 3	Revived era	Tenth Doctor	13	9	31 March 2007	30 June 2007	7.55	86
Series 4	Revived era	Tenth Doctor	13	10	5 April 2008	5 July 2008	8.05	88
Series 5	Revived era	Eleventh Doctor	13	10	3 April 2010	26 June 2010	7.25	86
Series 6	Revived era	Eleventh Doctor	13	11	23 April 2011	1 October 2011	7.52	86
Series 7	Revived era	Eleventh Doctor	13	13	1 September 2012	18 May 2013	7.44	86
Series 8	Revived era	Twelfth Doctor	12	11	23 August 2014	8 November 2014	7.26	83
Series 9	Revived era	Twelfth Doctor	12	9	19 September 2015	5 December 2015	6.03	82
Series 10	Revived era	Twelfth Doctor	12	11	15 April 2017	1 July 2017	5.46	83
Series 11	Revived era	Thirteenth Doctor	10	10	7 October 2018	9 December 2018	7.96	81
Series 12	Revived era	Thirteenth Doctor	10	8	1 January 2020	1 March 2020	5.40	80
Series 13 (Note: Also known by its subtitle, Flux)	Revived era	Thirteenth Doctor	6	1	31 October 2021	5 December 2021	4.95	77
Series 14 (Note: Also known by its official numbering, Season 1)	Revived era	Fifteenth Doctor	8	7	11 May 2024	22 June 2024	3.97	78
Series 15 (Note: Also known by its official numbering, Season 2)	Revived era	Fifteenth Doctor	8	7	12 April 2025	31 May 2025	3.23	–

=== Specials ===
Special(s)	Doctor	Episodes	Originally released		Average viewers (millions)	Average AI
Special(s)	Doctor	Episodes	First released	Last released	Average viewers (millions)	Average AI
20th anniversary	Fifth Doctor	1	25 November 1983		7.70	75
Television film	Eighth Doctor	1	12 May 1996		9.08	75
2005 Christmas	Tenth Doctor	1	25 December 2005		9.84	84
2006 Christmas	Tenth Doctor	1	25 December 2006		9.35	84
2007 Christmas	Tenth Doctor	1	25 December 2007		13.31	86
2008–2010 specials (Note: These specials consist of the 2008 Christmas, 2009 Easter, November, and Christmas, and 2010 New Year's Day episodes.)	Tenth Doctor	5	25 December 2008	1 January 2010	11.19	88
2010 Christmas	Eleventh Doctor	1	25 December 2010		12.11	83
2011 Christmas	Eleventh Doctor	1	25 December 2011		10.77	84
2012 Christmas	Eleventh Doctor	1	25 December 2012		9.87	87
2013 specials (Note: These specials consist of the 50th anniversary and 2013 Christmas episodes.)	Eleventh Doctor	2	23 November 2013	25 December 2013	11.97	86
2014 Christmas	Twelfth Doctor	1	25 December 2014		8.28	82
2015 Christmas	Twelfth Doctor	1	25 December 2015		7.69	82
2016 Christmas	Twelfth Doctor	1	25 December 2016		7.83	82
2017 Christmas	Twelfth Doctor	1	25 December 2017		7.92	81
2019 New Year	Thirteenth Doctor	1	1 January 2019		7.13	80
2021 New Year	Thirteenth Doctor	1	1 January 2021		6.36	79
2022 specials (Note: These specials consist of the 2022 New Year's Day, Easter, and BBC centenary episodes.)	Thirteenth Doctor	3	1 January 2022	23 October 2022	4.39	–
2023 specials (Note: These specials consist of the 60th anniversary episodes.)	Fourteenth Doctor	3	25 November 2023	9 December 2023	7.20	84
2023 Christmas	Fifteenth Doctor	1	25 December 2023		7.49	82
2024 Christmas	Fifteenth Doctor	1	25 December 2024		6.33	76

== Episodes ==
In 2005, the BBC relaunched Doctor Who after a 16-year absence from episodic television, with Russell T Davies, Julie Gardner, and Mal Young as executive producers, and Phil Collinson as producer. For the first time since the third season, each episode has a title. Unlike the classic series, most episodes told standalone stories. The show also returned to its traditional Saturday evening slot.

=== Ninth Doctor ===
The revived series began with Christopher Eccleston taking the lead role of the Ninth Doctor. During Eccleston's tenure, all episodes were set on Earth, or its orbit, in the past, present, or future. In his last story, "The Parting of the Ways", the Doctor absorbed the Time Vortex to save his companion, leading to his regeneration.

==== Series 1 (2005) ====
The 2005 series introduces Billie Piper as the companion Rose Tyler. A loose story arc deals with the consequences of the Time War and its impact on the Doctor, and the mystery of the seemingly omnipresent phrase "Bad Wolf". Beginning with "The Empty Child", John Barrowman appears as Jack Harkness. Adam Mitchell appears in the consecutive episodes "Dalek" and "The Long Game".

No. story	No. in series	Title	Directed by	Written by	Original release date	Prod. code	UK viewers (millions)	AI
157	1	"Rose"	Keith Boak	Russell T Davies	26 March 2005	1.1	10.81	76
158	2	"The End of the World"	Euros Lyn	Russell T Davies	2 April 2005	1.2	7.97	76
159	3	"The Unquiet Dead"	Euros Lyn	Mark Gatiss	9 April 2005	1.3	8.86	80
160a	4	"Aliens of London"	Keith Boak	Russell T Davies	16 April 2005	1.4	7.63	82
160b	5	"World War Three"	Keith Boak	Russell T Davies	23 April 2005	1.5	7.98	81
161	6	"Dalek"	Joe Ahearne	Robert Shearman	30 April 2005	1.6	8.63	84
162	7	"The Long Game"	Brian Grant	Russell T Davies	7 May 2005	1.7	8.01	81
163	8	"Father's Day"	Joe Ahearne	Paul Cornell	14 May 2005	1.8	8.06	83
164a	9	"The Empty Child"	James Hawes	Steven Moffat	21 May 2005	1.9	7.11	84
164b	10	"The Doctor Dances"	James Hawes	Steven Moffat	28 May 2005	1.10	6.86	85
165	11	"Boom Town"	Joe Ahearne	Russell T Davies	4 June 2005	1.11	7.68	82
166a	12	"Bad Wolf"	Joe Ahearne	Russell T Davies	11 June 2005	1.12	6.81	86
166b	13	"The Parting of the Ways"	Joe Ahearne	Russell T Davies	18 June 2005	1.13	6.91	89

=== Tenth Doctor ===
The Tenth Doctor was portrayed by David Tennant, who was cast before the first series aired. With the success of the first series, Doctor Who returned to its old formula of visiting alien planets in addition to time travel. Tennant retained the role until Part Two of "The End of Time" when the Doctor is killed by radiation poisoning while saving his companion.

==== Series 2 (2006) ====
The back-story for the spin-off series Torchwood is "seeded" in various episodes of the 2006 series. Rose continues travelling with the Doctor, leaving the programme at the end of the finale "Doomsday". From "School Reunion" to "The Age of Steel", Noel Clarke, who recurred in series 1, appeared as companion Mickey Smith.

No. story	No. in series	Title	Directed by	Written by	Original release date	Prod. code	UK viewers (millions)	AI
167	–	"The Christmas Invasion"	James Hawes	Russell T Davies	25 December 2005	2X	9.84	84
168	1	"New Earth"	James Hawes	Russell T Davies	15 April 2006	2.1	8.62	85
169	2	"Tooth and Claw"	Euros Lyn	Russell T Davies	22 April 2006	2.2	9.24	83
170	3	"School Reunion"	James Hawes	Toby Whithouse	29 April 2006	2.3	8.31	85
171	4	"The Girl in the Fireplace"	Euros Lyn	Steven Moffat	6 May 2006	2.4	7.90	84
172a	5	"Rise of the Cybermen"	Graeme Harper	Tom MacRae	13 May 2006	2.5	9.22	86
172b	6	"The Age of Steel"	Graeme Harper	Tom MacRae	20 May 2006	2.6	7.63	86
173	7	"The Idiot's Lantern"	Euros Lyn	Mark Gatiss	27 May 2006	2.7	6.76	84
174a	8	"The Impossible Planet"	James Strong	Matt Jones	3 June 2006	2.8	6.32	85
174b	9	"The Satan Pit"	James Strong	Matt Jones	10 June 2006	2.9	6.08	86
175	10	"Love & Monsters"	Dan Zeff	Russell T Davies	17 June 2006	2.10	6.66	76
176	11	"Fear Her"	Euros Lyn	Matthew Graham	24 June 2006	2.11	7.14	83
177a	12	"Army of Ghosts"	Graeme Harper	Russell T Davies	1 July 2006	2.12	8.19	86
177b	13	"Doomsday"	Graeme Harper	Russell T Davies	8 July 2006	2.13	8.22	89

==== Series 3 (2007) ====
This series introduces Freema Agyeman as the companion Martha Jones, whose time as the companion ends in the finale "Last of the Time Lords", and deals with the mysterious Mr Saxon, and the Doctor dealing with the loss of Rose Tyler.

No. story	No. in series	Title	Directed by	Written by	Original release date	Prod. code	UK viewers (millions)	AI
178	–	"The Runaway Bride"	Euros Lyn	Russell T Davies	25 December 2006	3X	9.35	84
179	1	"Smith and Jones"	Charles Palmer	Russell T Davies	31 March 2007	3.1	8.71	88
180	2	"The Shakespeare Code"	Charles Palmer	Gareth Roberts	7 April 2007	3.2	7.23	87
181	3	"Gridlock"	Richard Clark	Russell T Davies	14 April 2007	3.3	8.41	85
182a	4	"Daleks in Manhattan"	James Strong	Helen Raynor	21 April 2007	3.4	6.69	86
182b	5	"Evolution of the Daleks"	James Strong	Helen Raynor	28 April 2007	3.5	6.97	85
183	6	"The Lazarus Experiment"	Richard Clark	Stephen Greenhorn	5 May 2007	3.6	7.19	86
184	7	"42"	Graeme Harper	Chris Chibnall	19 May 2007	3.7	7.41	85
185a	8	"Human Nature"	Charles Palmer	Paul Cornell	26 May 2007	3.8	7.74	86
185b	9	"The Family of Blood"	Charles Palmer	Paul Cornell	2 June 2007	3.9	7.21	86
186	10	"Blink"	Hettie MacDonald	Steven Moffat	9 June 2007	3.10	6.62	87
187a	11	"Utopia"	Graeme Harper	Russell T Davies	16 June 2007	3.11	7.84	87
187b	12	"The Sound of Drums"	Colin Teague	Russell T Davies	23 June 2007	3.12	7.51	87
187c	13	"Last of the Time Lords"	Colin Teague	Russell T Davies	30 June 2007	3.13	8.61	88

==== Series 4 (2008) ====
In this series, Catherine Tate reprises her role as Donna Noble from "The Runaway Bride", this time as a full-fledged companion. The coincidences binding the Doctor and Donna together are explored. Donna departs in the second part of the finale "Journey's End". The first part "The Stolen Earth" brings back all the long-term companions in the revived series up to that moment for the finale. There is also a loose story arc of many planets as well as bees mysteriously disappearing.

No. story	No. in series	Title	Directed by	Written by	Original release date	Prod. code	UK viewers (millions)	AI
188	–	"Voyage of the Damned"	James Strong	Russell T Davies	25 December 2007	4X	13.31	86
189	1	"Partners in Crime"	James Strong	Russell T Davies	5 April 2008	4.1	9.14	88
190	2	"The Fires of Pompeii"	Colin Teague	James Moran	12 April 2008	4.3	9.04	87
191	3	"Planet of the Ood"	Graeme Harper	Keith Temple	19 April 2008	4.2	7.50	87
192a	4	"The Sontaran Stratagem"	Douglas Mackinnon	Helen Raynor	26 April 2008	4.4	7.06	87
192b	5	"The Poison Sky"	Douglas Mackinnon	Helen Raynor	3 May 2008	4.5	6.53	88
193	6	"The Doctor's Daughter"	Alice Troughton	Stephen Greenhorn	10 May 2008	4.6	7.33	88
194	7	"The Unicorn and the Wasp"	Graeme Harper	Gareth Roberts	17 May 2008	4.7	8.41	86
195a	8	"Silence in the Library"	Euros Lyn	Steven Moffat	31 May 2008	4.9	6.27	89
195b	9	"Forest of the Dead"	Euros Lyn	Steven Moffat	7 June 2008	4.10	7.84	89
196	10	"Midnight"	Alice Troughton	Russell T Davies	14 June 2008	4.8	8.05	86
197	11	"Turn Left"	Graeme Harper	Russell T Davies	21 June 2008	4.11	8.09	88
198a	12	"The Stolen Earth"	Graeme Harper	Russell T Davies	28 June 2008	4.12	8.78	91
198b	13	"Journey's End"	Graeme Harper	Russell T Davies	5 July 2008	4.13	10.57	91

==== Specials (2008–2010) ====
The specials focus ("Planet of the Dead" onwards) on a premonition of "four knocks" leading to the death of the Tenth Doctor. The Doctor continues travelling alone in all the specials, taking one-off companions as he deals with the grief of continuously ending up alone again and again.

No. story	No. special	Title	Directed by	Written by	Original release date	Prod. code	UK viewers (millions)	AI
199	1	"The Next Doctor"	Andy Goddard	Russell T Davies	25 December 2008	4.14	13.10	86
200	2	"Planet of the Dead"	James Strong	Russell T Davies & Gareth Roberts	11 April 2009	4.15	9.54	88
201	3	"The Waters of Mars"	Graeme Harper	Russell T Davies & Phil Ford	15 November 2009	4.16	9.94	88
202a	4	"The End of Time – Part One"	Euros Lyn	Russell T Davies	25 December 2009	4.17	11.57	87
202b	5	"The End of Time – Part Two"	Euros Lyn	Russell T Davies	1 January 2010	4.18	11.79	89

=== Eleventh Doctor ===
The Eleventh Doctor was portrayed by Matt Smith. Steven Moffat took over as showrunner from the fifth series, with an emphasis on stories involving twisting and complicated plots. Smith retained the role until the Christmas special "The Time of the Doctor", with the Doctor dying due to old age and fatigue from a centuries-long war.

==== Series 5 (2010) ====
This series introduces Karen Gillan and Arthur Darvill as companions Amy Pond and Rory Williams respectively. It deals with cracks spreading throughout time and space erasing things from existence; the opening of the "Pandorica" is also mentioned in various episodes.

No. story	No. in series	Title	Directed by	Written by	Original release date	Prod. code	UK viewers (millions)	AI
203	1	"The Eleventh Hour"	Adam Smith	Steven Moffat	3 April 2010	1.1	9.59	86
204	2	"The Beast Below"	Andrew Gunn	Steven Moffat	10 April 2010	1.2	7.93	86
205	3	"Victory of the Daleks"	Andrew Gunn	Mark Gatiss	17 April 2010	1.3	7.82	84
206a	4	"The Time of Angels"	Adam Smith	Steven Moffat	24 April 2010	1.4	8.13	87
206b	5	"Flesh and Stone"	Adam Smith	Steven Moffat	1 May 2010	1.5	8.02	86
207	6	"The Vampires of Venice"	Jonny Campbell	Toby Whithouse	8 May 2010	1.6	7.28	86
208	7	"Amy's Choice"	Catherine Morshead	Simon Nye	15 May 2010	1.7	7.06	84
209a	8	"The Hungry Earth"	Ashley Way	Chris Chibnall	22 May 2010	1.8	6.01	86
209b	9	"Cold Blood"	Ashley Way	Chris Chibnall	29 May 2010	1.9	7.04	85
210	10	"Vincent and the Doctor"	Jonny Campbell	Richard Curtis	5 June 2010	1.10	6.29	86
211	11	"The Lodger"	Catherine Morshead	Gareth Roberts	12 June 2010	1.11	5.98	87
212a	12	"The Pandorica Opens"	Toby Haynes	Steven Moffat	19 June 2010	1.12	6.94	88
212b	13	"The Big Bang"	Toby Haynes	Steven Moffat	26 June 2010	1.13	6.12	89

==== Series 6 (2011) ====
This series centres on the true identity of River Song (who was introduced in series 4 and recurred in series 5, played by Alex Kingston), and the Doctor's "death". The original transmission of series 6 was split into two parts, with the first seven episodes airing April to June 2011 and the final six from late August to October 2011.

No. story	No. in series	Title	Directed by	Written by	Original release date	Prod. code	UK viewers (millions)	AI
213	–	"A Christmas Carol"	Toby Haynes	Steven Moffat	25 December 2010	2.X	12.11	83
214a	1	"The Impossible Astronaut"	Toby Haynes	Steven Moffat	23 April 2011	2.1	8.86	88
214b	2	"Day of the Moon"	Toby Haynes	Steven Moffat	30 April 2011	2.2	7.30	87
215	3	"The Curse of the Black Spot"	Jeremy Webb	Stephen Thompson	7 May 2011	2.9	7.85	86
216	4	"The Doctor's Wife"	Richard Clark	Neil Gaiman	14 May 2011	2.3	7.97	87
217a	5	"The Rebel Flesh"	Julian Simpson	Matthew Graham	21 May 2011	2.5	7.35	85
217b	6	"The Almost People"	Julian Simpson	Matthew Graham	28 May 2011	2.6	6.72	86
218	7	"A Good Man Goes to War"	Peter Hoar	Steven Moffat	4 June 2011	2.7	7.51	88
219	8	"Let's Kill Hitler"	Richard Senior	Steven Moffat	27 August 2011	2.8	8.10	85
220	9	"Night Terrors"	Richard Clark	Mark Gatiss	3 September 2011	2.4	7.07	86
221	10	"The Girl Who Waited"	Nick Hurran	Tom MacRae	10 September 2011	2.10	7.60	85
222	11	"The God Complex"	Nick Hurran	Toby Whithouse	17 September 2011	2.11	6.77	86
223	12	"Closing Time"	Steve Hughes	Gareth Roberts	24 September 2011	2.12	6.93	86
224	13	"The Wedding of River Song"	Jeremy Webb	Steven Moffat	1 October 2011	2.13	7.67	86

==== Series 7 (2012–2013) ====
Series 7 started with five episodes, was split by a Christmas special in late 2012, and was completed by eight episodes in 2013. It deals with the exit of the Ponds midway through the series in "The Angels Take Manhattan", and the mystery of the new companion Clara Oswald portrayed by Jenna Coleman.

No. story	No. in series	Title	Directed by	Written by	Original release date	UK viewers (millions)	AI
225	–	"The Doctor, the Widow and the Wardrobe"	Farren Blackburn	Steven Moffat	25 December 2011	10.77	84
226	1	"Asylum of the Daleks"	Nick Hurran	Steven Moffat	1 September 2012	8.33	89
227	2	"Dinosaurs on a Spaceship"	Saul Metzstein	Chris Chibnall	8 September 2012	7.57	87
228	3	"A Town Called Mercy"	Saul Metzstein	Toby Whithouse	15 September 2012	8.42	85
229	4	"The Power of Three"	Douglas Mackinnon	Chris Chibnall	22 September 2012	7.67	87
230	5	"The Angels Take Manhattan"	Nick Hurran	Steven Moffat	29 September 2012	7.82	88
231	–	"The Snowmen"	Saul Metzstein	Steven Moffat	25 December 2012	9.87	87
232	6	"The Bells of Saint John"	Colm McCarthy	Steven Moffat	30 March 2013	8.44	87
233	7	"The Rings of Akhaten"	Farren Blackburn	Neil Cross	6 April 2013	7.45	84
234	8	"Cold War"	Douglas Mackinnon	Mark Gatiss	13 April 2013	7.37	84
235	9	"Hide"	Jamie Payne	Neil Cross	20 April 2013	6.61	85
236	10	"Journey to the Centre of the TARDIS"	Mat King	Stephen Thompson	27 April 2013	6.50	85
237	11	"The Crimson Horror"	Saul Metzstein	Mark Gatiss	4 May 2013	6.47	85
238	12	"Nightmare in Silver"	Stephen Woolfenden	Neil Gaiman	11 May 2013	6.64	84
239	13	"The Name of the Doctor"	Saul Metzstein	Steven Moffat	18 May 2013	7.45	88

==== Specials (2013) ====
The first special focuses on various incarnations of the Doctor, including the return of the Tenth Doctor as well as the reveal of a secret incarnation called the War Doctor and his actions during the Time War. The second special focuses on the Eleventh Doctor's regeneration as he dedicates his life to protecting the planet Trenzalore.

No. story	No. special	Title	Directed by	Written by	Original release date	UK viewers (millions)	AI
240	1	"The Day of the Doctor"	Nick Hurran	Steven Moffat	23 November 2013	12.80	88
241	2	"The Time of the Doctor"	Jamie Payne	Steven Moffat	25 December 2013	11.14	83

=== Twelfth Doctor ===
The Twelfth Doctor was portrayed by Peter Capaldi. His tenure saw a reduction of total episodes per series from thirteen to twelve. His Doctor was characterised by his grappling with the question of the meaning of goodness and whether he is himself a good man. Capaldi played the role until the Christmas special "Twice Upon a Time" (in which he crossed paths with the First Doctor), after his last stand against the Cybermen in the previous episode.

==== Series 8 (2014) ====
The series deals with the Doctor's questioning of him being a good man, and the mystery of the identity of the character "Missy".

No. story	No. in series	Title	Directed by	Written by	Original release date	UK viewers (millions)	AI
242	1	"Deep Breath"	Ben Wheatley	Steven Moffat	23 August 2014	9.17	82
243	2	"Into the Dalek"	Ben Wheatley	Phil Ford and Steven Moffat	30 August 2014	7.29	84
244	3	"Robot of Sherwood"	Paul Murphy	Mark Gatiss	6 September 2014	7.28	82
245	4	"Listen"	Douglas Mackinnon	Steven Moffat	13 September 2014	7.01	82
246	5	"Time Heist"	Douglas Mackinnon	Stephen Thompson and Steven Moffat	20 September 2014	6.99	84
247	6	"The Caretaker"	Paul Murphy	Gareth Roberts and Steven Moffat	27 September 2014	6.82	83
248	7	"Kill the Moon"	Paul Wilmshurst	Peter Harness	4 October 2014	6.91	82
249	8	"Mummy on the Orient Express"	Paul Wilmshurst	Jamie Mathieson	11 October 2014	7.11	85
250	9	"Flatline"	Douglas Mackinnon	Jamie Mathieson	18 October 2014	6.71	85
251	10	"In the Forest of the Night"	Sheree Folkson	Frank Cottrell-Boyce	25 October 2014	6.92	83
252a	11	"Dark Water"	Rachel Talalay	Steven Moffat	1 November 2014	7.34	85
252b	12	"Death in Heaven"	Rachel Talalay	Steven Moffat	8 November 2014	7.60	83

==== Series 9 (2015) ====
The series is almost exclusively made up of two-episode stories and loose story arcs. It deals with the "prophecy of the Hybrid", and the consequences of the changing dynamics of the Doctor and Clara's relationship, which leads to her departure in the finale "Hell Bent".

No. story	No. in series	Title	Directed by	Written by	Original release date	UK viewers (millions)	AI
253	–	"Last Christmas"	Paul Wilmshurst	Steven Moffat	25 December 2014	8.28	82
254a	1	"The Magician's Apprentice"	Hettie MacDonald	Steven Moffat	19 September 2015	6.54	84
254b	2	"The Witch's Familiar"	Hettie MacDonald	Steven Moffat	26 September 2015	5.71	83
255a	3	"Under the Lake"	Daniel O'Hara	Toby Whithouse	3 October 2015	5.63	84
255b	4	"Before the Flood"	Daniel O'Hara	Toby Whithouse	10 October 2015	6.05	83
256	5	"The Girl Who Died"	Ed Bazalgette	Jamie Mathieson and Steven Moffat	17 October 2015	6.56	82
257	6	"The Woman Who Lived"	Ed Bazalgette	Catherine Tregenna	24 October 2015	6.11	81
258a	7	"The Zygon Invasion"	Daniel Nettheim	Peter Harness	31 October 2015	5.76	82
258b	8	"The Zygon Inversion"	Daniel Nettheim	Peter Harness and Steven Moffat	7 November 2015	6.03	84
259	9	"Sleep No More"	Justin Molotnikov	Mark Gatiss	14 November 2015	5.61	78
260	10	"Face the Raven"	Justin Molotnikov	Sarah Dollard	21 November 2015	6.05	84
261	11	"Heaven Sent"	Rachel Talalay	Steven Moffat	28 November 2015	6.19	80
262	12	"Hell Bent"	Rachel Talalay	Steven Moffat	5 December 2015	6.17	82
263	–	"The Husbands of River Song"	Douglas Mackinnon	Steven Moffat	25 December 2015	7.69	82

==== Series 10 (2017) ====
The series deals with the mystery of a vault and the Doctor's oath of guarding it, later exploring the Doctor and Missy's relationship, and the possibility of Missy turning good. This season introduces Pearl Mackie and Matt Lucas as the Doctor's new companions Bill Potts and Nardole respectively, both of whom depart in the series's corresponding Christmas special "Twice Upon a Time".

No. story	No. in series	Title	Directed by	Written by	Original release date	UK viewers (millions)	AI
264	–	"The Return of Doctor Mysterio"	Ed Bazalgette	Steven Moffat	25 December 2016	7.83	82
265	1	"The Pilot"	Lawrence Gough	Steven Moffat	15 April 2017	6.68	83
266	2	"Smile"	Lawrence Gough	Frank Cottrell-Boyce	22 April 2017	5.98	83
267	3	"Thin Ice"	Bill Anderson	Sarah Dollard	29 April 2017	5.61	84
268	4	"Knock Knock"	Bill Anderson	Mike Bartlett	6 May 2017	5.73	83
269	5	"Oxygen"	Charles Palmer	Jamie Mathieson	13 May 2017	5.27	83
270	6	"Extremis"	Daniel Nettheim	Steven Moffat	20 May 2017	5.53	82
271	7	"The Pyramid at the End of the World"	Daniel Nettheim	Peter Harness and Steven Moffat	27 May 2017	5.79	82
272	8	"The Lie of the Land"	Wayne Yip	Toby Whithouse	3 June 2017	4.82	82
273	9	"Empress of Mars"	Wayne Yip	Mark Gatiss	10 June 2017	5.02	83
274	10	"The Eaters of Light"	Charles Palmer	Rona Munro	17 June 2017	4.73	81
275a	11	"World Enough and Time"	Rachel Talalay	Steven Moffat	24 June 2017	5.00	85
275b	12	"The Doctor Falls"	Rachel Talalay	Steven Moffat	1 July 2017	5.29	83
276	–	"Twice Upon a Time"	Rachel Talalay	Steven Moffat	25 December 2017	7.92	81

=== Thirteenth Doctor ===
The Thirteenth Doctor was portrayed by Jodie Whittaker, becoming the first woman to play the role. Chris Chibnall took over as showrunner from the eleventh series onwards, with a reduction of episodes from twelve to ten. The time slot was changed to Sunday. They both departed in the special "The Power of the Doctor", with the Doctor dying at the hands of the Master.

==== Series 11 (2018) ====
The series introduces Mandip Gill, Bradley Walsh and Tosin Cole as the new companions Yasmin Khan, Graham O'Brien and Ryan Sinclair respectively.

No. story	No. in series	Title	Directed by	Written by	Original release date	UK viewers (millions)	AI
277	1	"The Woman Who Fell to Earth"	Jamie Childs	Chris Chibnall	7 October 2018	10.96	83
278	2	"The Ghost Monument"	Mark Tonderai	Chris Chibnall	14 October 2018	9.00	82
279	3	"Rosa"	Mark Tonderai	Malorie Blackman and Chris Chibnall	21 October 2018	8.41	83
280	4	"Arachnids in the UK"	Sallie Aprahamian	Chris Chibnall	28 October 2018	8.22	83
281	5	"The Tsuranga Conundrum"	Jennifer Perrott	Chris Chibnall	4 November 2018	7.76	79
282	6	"Demons of the Punjab"	Jamie Childs	Vinay Patel	11 November 2018	7.48	80
283	7	"Kerblam!"	Jennifer Perrott	Pete McTighe	18 November 2018	7.46	81
284	8	"The Witchfinders"	Sallie Aprahamian	Joy Wilkinson	25 November 2018	7.21	81
285	9	"It Takes You Away"	Jamie Childs	Ed Hime	2 December 2018	6.42	80
286	10	"The Battle of Ranskoor Av Kolos"	Jamie Childs	Chris Chibnall	9 December 2018	6.65	79
287	–	"Resolution"	Wayne Yip	Chris Chibnall	1 January 2019	7.13	80

==== Series 12 (2020) ====
This series deals with a new incarnation of the Master, the appearance of an unknown incarnation of the Doctor, the destruction of her homeworld Gallifrey and the secret of the Timeless Child. It saw the return of Jack Harkness in a cameo. The concluding special is the last regular appearance of Graham and Ryan.

No. story	No. in series	Title	Directed by	Written by	Original release date	UK viewers (millions)	AI
288a	1	"Spyfall, Part 1"	Jamie Magnus Stone	Chris Chibnall	1 January 2020	6.89	82
288b	2	"Spyfall, Part 2"	Lee Haven Jones	Chris Chibnall	5 January 2020	6.07	82
289	3	"Orphan 55"	Lee Haven Jones	Ed Hime	12 January 2020	5.38	77
290	4	"Nikola Tesla's Night of Terror"	Nida Manzoor	Nina Metivier	19 January 2020	5.20	79
291	5	"Fugitive of the Judoon"	Nida Manzoor	Vinay Patel and Chris Chibnall	26 January 2020	5.57	83
292	6	"Praxeus"	Jamie Magnus Stone	Pete McTighe and Chris Chibnall	2 February 2020	5.22	78
293	7	"Can You Hear Me?"	Emma Sullivan	Charlene James and Chris Chibnall	9 February 2020	4.89	78
294	8	"The Haunting of Villa Diodati"	Emma Sullivan	Maxine Alderton	16 February 2020	5.07	80
295a	9	"Ascension of the Cybermen"	Jamie Magnus Stone	Chris Chibnall	23 February 2020	4.99	81
295b	10	"The Timeless Children"	Jamie Magnus Stone	Chris Chibnall	1 March 2020	4.69	82
296	–	"Revolution of the Daleks"	Lee Haven Jones	Chris Chibnall	1 January 2021	6.36	79

==== Series 13 (2021) ====
Series 13 is a single story arc, subtitled Flux, consisting of six episodes. It involves a universe-ending anomaly, called the "Flux", which leads to several enemies separately attempting to take over Earth and destroy most of the universe. John Bishop joined the series as new companion Dan.

No. story	No. in series	Title (Note: These titles are normally prefixed with their respective "Chapter" number, or with the overall serial title "Flux".)	Directed by	Written by	Original release date	UK viewers (millions)	AI
297a	1	"The Halloween Apocalypse"	Jamie Magnus Stone	Chris Chibnall	31 October 2021	5.81	76
297b	2	"War of the Sontarans"	Jamie Magnus Stone	Chris Chibnall	7 November 2021	5.12	77
297c	3	"Once, Upon Time"	Azhur Saleem	Chris Chibnall	14 November 2021	4.70	75
297d	4	"Village of the Angels"	Jamie Magnus Stone	Chris Chibnall and Maxine Alderton	21 November 2021	4.57	79
297e	5	"Survivors of the Flux"	Azhur Saleem	Chris Chibnall	28 November 2021	4.87	77
297f	6	"The Vanquishers"	Azhur Saleem	Chris Chibnall	5 December 2021	4.68	76

==== Specials (2022) ====
The specials loosely continued from Flux, with the last special celebrating the BBC's centenary. They deal with Yaz and the Doctor's relationship and the lead up to the Thirteenth Doctor's regeneration. Both Dan and Yaz depart in the finale.

No. story	No. special	Title	Directed by	Written by	Original release date	UK viewers (millions)
298	1	"Eve of the Daleks"	Annetta Laufer	Chris Chibnall	1 January 2022	4.40
299	2	"Legend of the Sea Devils"	Haolu Wang	Ella Road and Chris Chibnall	17 April 2022	3.47
300	3	"The Power of the Doctor"	Jamie Magnus Stone	Chris Chibnall	23 October 2022	5.30

=== Fourteenth Doctor ===
The Fourteenth Doctor was portrayed by David Tennant, who previously portrayed the Tenth Doctor and returned to the show for its 60th anniversary. Additionally, Russell T Davies returned as showrunner. Bad Wolf and Disney+ began co-producing the programme, (Note: Though not directly stated as such in the Fourteenth and Fifteenth Doctor's episode end slates nor by the BBC's early announcements in September 2021 and October 2022, which mention BBC Studios and Bad Wolf alone, or refer to Disney Branded Television as a non-UK and Ireland distribution partner, Russell T Davies has called the deal a Disney+ co-production in interviews, and sources like HuffPost and The Independent retrospectively said Disney+ were announced as co-producers in October 2022.) while Disney+ handled international distribution outside the UK and Ireland.

==== Specials (2023) ====
These specials celebrate the 60th anniversary, and were preceded by a Children in Need minisode about the Doctor and Davros. They reunite the Doctor with Donna Noble; introduce Beep the Meep on-screen; involve thwarting a threat at the universe's edge; re-introduce the Toymaker; and conclude with the Fourteenth Doctor's unique bi-generation.

No. story	No. special	Title	Directed by	Written by	Original release date (Note: The episodes were released simultaneously at 6:30 p.m. GMT in the United Kingdom on BBC One, and at 10:30 a.m. PT in the United States on Disney+.)	UK viewers (millions)	AI
301	1	"The Star Beast"	Rachel Talalay	Russell T Davies, from a story by Pat Mills and Dave Gibbons	25 November 2023	7.61	84
302	2	"Wild Blue Yonder"	Tom Kingsley	Russell T Davies	2 December 2023	7.14	83
303	3	"The Giggle"	Chanya Button	Russell T Davies	9 December 2023	6.85	85

=== Fifteenth Doctor ===
The Fifteenth Doctor was portrayed by Ncuti Gatwa. His tenure saw the episode count reduced from ten to eight. Gatwa played the role for two series, regenerating in the series 15 finale after sacrificing himself to save Poppy, Belinda's daughter.

==== Series 14 (2024) ====
The Christmas special introduces Millie Gibson as companion Ruby Sunday, while the following series centred around the mystery of Ruby's birth, and a mysterious woman who appeared in different forms within each of the Doctor and Ruby's adventures. With this series, the numbering system was reset in marketing, starting with "Season 1".

Doctor Who series 14 episodes
No. story	No. in series	Title	Directed by	Written by	Original release date (Note: Episodes for the fourteenth series were released simultaneously at 12 a.m. BST in the United Kingdom on BBC iPlayer (followed by a 7 p.m. BBC One broadcast the same day), and at 4 p.m. PT the day prior in the United States on Disney+.)	UK viewers (millions)	AI
304	–	"The Church on Ruby Road"	Mark Tonderai	Russell T Davies	25 December 2023	7.49	82
305	1	"Space Babies"	Julie Anne Robinson	Russell T Davies	11 May 2024	4.62	75
306	2	"The Devil's Chord"	Ben Chessell	Russell T Davies	11 May 2024	4.24	77
307	3	"Boom"	Julie Anne Robinson	Steven Moffat	18 May 2024	3.63	78
308	4	"73 Yards"	Dylan Holmes Williams	Russell T Davies	25 May 2024	4.26	77
309	5	"Dot and Bubble"	Dylan Holmes Williams	Russell T Davies	1 June 2024	3.62	77
310	6	"Rogue"	Ben Chessell	Kate Herron and Briony Redman	8 June 2024	3.66	77
311a	7	"The Legend of Ruby Sunday"	Jamie Donoughue	Russell T Davies	15 June 2024	3.79	81
311b	8	"Empire of Death"	Jamie Donoughue	Russell T Davies	22 June 2024	3.94	80

==== Series 15 (2025) ====
A Christmas special aired on 25 December 2024, preceding the eight-episode fifteenth series, which premiered in April 2025. Millie Gibson returned as Ruby Sunday alongside new companion Belinda Chandra, played by Varada Sethu. Filming occurred between 23 October 2023 and 25 May 2024. This series was numbered in marketing as "Season 2". In this series, the Doctor tries to get Belinda home to 2025, but they keep getting repelled by a "sinister force".

No. story	No. in series	Title	Directed by	Written by	Original release date (Note: The first seven episodes for the fifteenth series were released simultaneously at 8 a.m. BST in the United Kingdom on BBC iPlayer (followed by a 7 p.m. BBC One broadcast the same day), and at 12 a.m. PT in the United States on Disney+. The final episode was released simultaneously at 7 p.m. BST in the United Kingdom on BBC iPlayer and BBC One, and at 11 a.m. PT in the United States on Disney+.)	UK viewers (millions)	AI
312	–	"Joy to the World"	Alex Sanjiv Pillai	Steven Moffat	25 December 2024	6.33	76
313	1	"The Robot Revolution"	Peter Hoar	Russell T Davies	12 April 2025	3.56	–
314	2	"Lux"	Amanda Brotchie	Russell T Davies	19 April 2025	3.04	–
315	3	"The Well"	Amanda Brotchie	Russell T Davies & Sharma Angel-Walfall	26 April 2025	3.24	–
316	4	"Lucky Day"	Peter Hoar	Pete McTighe	3 May 2025	2.83	–
317	5	"The Story & the Engine"	Makalla McPherson	Inua Ellams	10 May 2025	2.71	–
318	6	"The Interstellar Song Contest"	Ben A. Williams	Juno Dawson	17 May 2025	3.79	–
319a	7	"Wish World"	Alex Sanjiv Pillai	Russell T Davies	24 May 2025	3.16	–
319b	8	"The Reality War"	Alex Sanjiv Pillai	Russell T Davies	31 May 2025	3.48	–

=== Future ===
Davies left again after series 15, after he, the BBC, and Bad Wolf collectively decided that the previously-announced plans for a 2026 Christmas special to bridge his era with a successor would not go ahead. The BBC announced in June 2026 that it would put the programme out to competitive tender. The BBC subsequently published the tender three months later in September, with a contract to be awarded to the winning producer the following March for one series of episodes and specials, anticipated to transmit in 2028 or 2029, with the option for the BBC to commission a second series.

== See also ==
- Doctor Who missing episodes
- List of Doctor Who Christmas and New Year's specials
- List of unmade Doctor Who serials and films
- List of Doctor Who audio releases
- List of Doctor Who home video releases
- List of Doctor Who audio plays by Big Finish
- List of Doctor Who radio stories
- List of supplementary Doctor Who episodes
- Doctor Who spin-offs
