= Boom (Doctor Who) =

2024 Doctor Who episode

307 – "Boom"
- Doctor Who episode
- Promotional title-card

Cast
- Doctor: Ncuti Gatwa – Fifteenth Doctor
- Companion: Millie Gibson – Ruby Sunday
- Others: Joe Anderson – John Francis Vater; Majid Mehdizadeh-Valoujerdy – Carson; Caoilinn Springall – Splice Alison Vater; Varada Sethu – Mundy Flynn; Bhav Joshi – Canterbury James Olliphant; Susan Twist – Ambulance

Production
- Directed by: Julie Anne Robinson
- Written by: Steven Moffat
- Produced by: Vicki Delow
- Executive producers: Russell T Davies; Julie Gardner; Jane Tranter; Joel Collins; Phil Collinson; Julie Anne Robinson; Steven Moffat
- Music by: Murray Gold
- Series: Series 14
- Running time: 44 minutes
- First broadcast: 18 May 2024

Chronology
| ← Preceded by "The Devil's Chord" | Followed by → "73 Yards" |

"Boom" is the third episode of the fourteenth series of the British science fiction television series Doctor Who. It was written by Steven Moffat, who had previously been showrunner from 2010 to 2017, and directed by Julie Anne Robinson. It was broadcast in the United Kingdom on BBC One on 18 May 2024 and released in the United States on Disney+ on 17 May.

The episode revolves around the Fifteenth Doctor (Ncuti Gatwa) and his companion, Ruby Sunday (Millie Gibson), who land on an alien planet in the midst of a large-scale war. When the Doctor steps on a landmine, he is forced to come up with a solution to disarm it without moving. In what is considered to be a bottle episode, Varada Sethu, who was not expected to debut in Doctor Who until the following series, makes a guest appearance as Mundy Flynn.

The episode was watched by 3.63 million viewers and critical reception of the episode was positive.

== Plot ==
On a war-torn alien planet, injured soldier John Francis Vater of the Anglican Army is hunted by a robotic ambulance. He is killed by the ambulance, and his body is turned into a cylinder that contains an AI with his personality. The Doctor and Ruby arrive as this is happening, and after hearing Vater's screams, give chase to investigate. In the process, the Doctor steps on a landmine and cannot move as this will activate it. The landmine, which comes from the Villengard weapons manufacturing company, is triggered by affecting the DNA of whoever steps on it and turning them into an explosive. He knows his DNA – that of a Time Lord – would cause an explosion that would destroy half the planet.

To avoid the Doctor having to stand on one leg, Ruby gives him the nearest object she finds, Vater's cylinder, so he can counterbalance himself. Vater's daughter Splice arrives, looking for her father. Ruby is forced to keep Splice away from the Doctor and the cylinder so she won't trigger the landmine. The trio are then joined by soldier Mundy Flynn of the Anglican Army. Mundy explains they are fighting Kastarions, aliens they believe live underground. Mundy shoots the Doctor, which attracts another ambulance. Ruby and Mundy are forced to distract it with combat so that it doesn't "treat" the Doctor. Canterbury James Olliphant (known as Canto) arrives, another soldier. He harbours a crush on Mundy, and unaware that Ruby isn't a threat to Mundy, he shoots and severely injures her.

The Doctor then realises that there are no Kastarions, and that the weapons company Villengard is making money by creating a conflict and a reason for soldiers to be there. To stop the landmine, as well as the ambulances arriving, the Doctor realises that they need to end the conflict. He convinces Vater's AI to go into Villengard's databases and convince the Anglicans to surrender by finding proof that the Kastarions don't exist. While trying to reconfigure an ambulance treating Ruby, Canto is killed. The AI form of Canto in his cylinder admits to Mundy how much he loved her. Villengard's ambulances attempt to stop Vater, but he succeeds and ends the war, which allows the Doctor to step off the landmine and the ambulance to actually treat Ruby. Mundy takes Splice in, having previously promised Vater she would, as they see a relieved Doctor and Ruby off.

== Production ==
=== Development ===
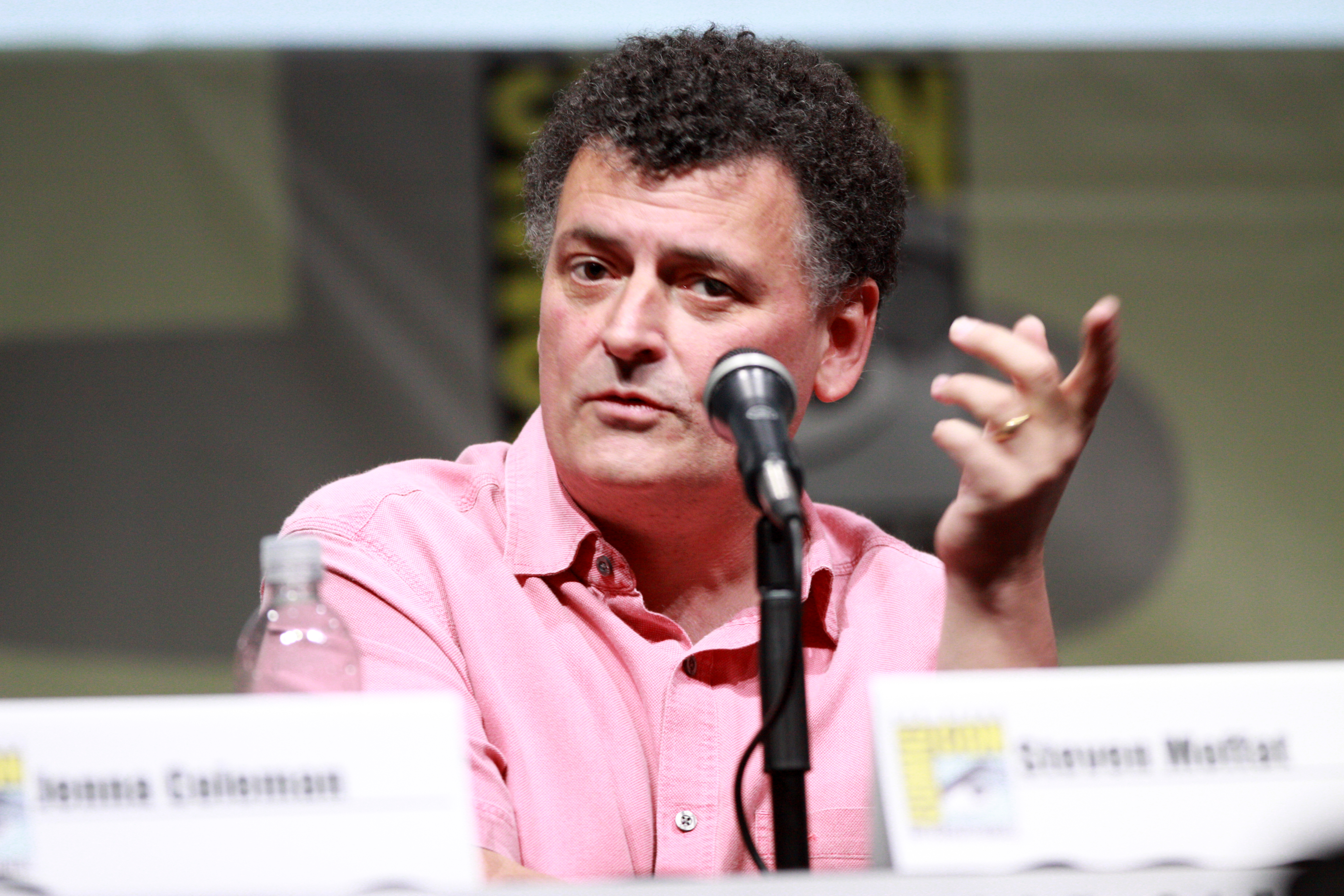
The episode marked the return of Steven Moffat, a former showrunner, to the series as a guest writer and executive producer.

"Boom" was written by former Doctor Who showrunner and executive producer Steven Moffat. It was the first episode he had written for the programme since "Twice Upon a Time" (2017). Moffat was first asked to return to the show by the incumbent showrunner and his original prececessor, Russell T Davies, soon after his own return to Doctor Who was agreed behind the scenes in 2021. Davies emailed Moffat with the news prior to it being officially announced, and the two subsequently called each other, with Davies taking the opportunity to ask him about returning to write again as a vague aside. Moffat initially downplayed the offer, as he was unsure he had any new ideas left for the series.

Davies and Moffat nonetheless began discussing and exchanging different potential stories again in their regular chats; Moffat originally considered returns for the Silence and Weeping Angels, and even accidentally suggested a plot similar to one that had already been done under his tenure by another writer ("The God Complex" by Toby Whithouse). According to him, when he eventually came up with and sent the basic concept of "Boom", Davies responded within just 30 seconds, eagerly accepting it. Moffat began writing a rough version of the episode at this time, before officially telling the production office he had now accepted Davies' offer. After writing the first 12–14 pages of the script, he believed the episode didn't start in the proper place and started fresh.

When conceptualizing the episode, Moffat took inspiration from the first episode of Genesis of the Daleks (1975) in which the Doctor steps on a landmine for a few moments, wanting to expand on the concept to span an episode's entirety. He also hoped to create a suspenseful, tension-led episode, feeling that it was one genre the programme had not previously explored. The episode also expanded on the story of a fictional company called "Villengard" that manufactures weapons, which was first mentioned in "The Doctor Dances" (2005), also written by Moffat. The read-through for the episode took place on 1 March 2023. Moffat assumed the role of executive producer and led meetings that determined the tone of the episode before filming began. "Boom" featured limited set locations and a small cast causing it to be considered a bottle episode.

=== Filming ===
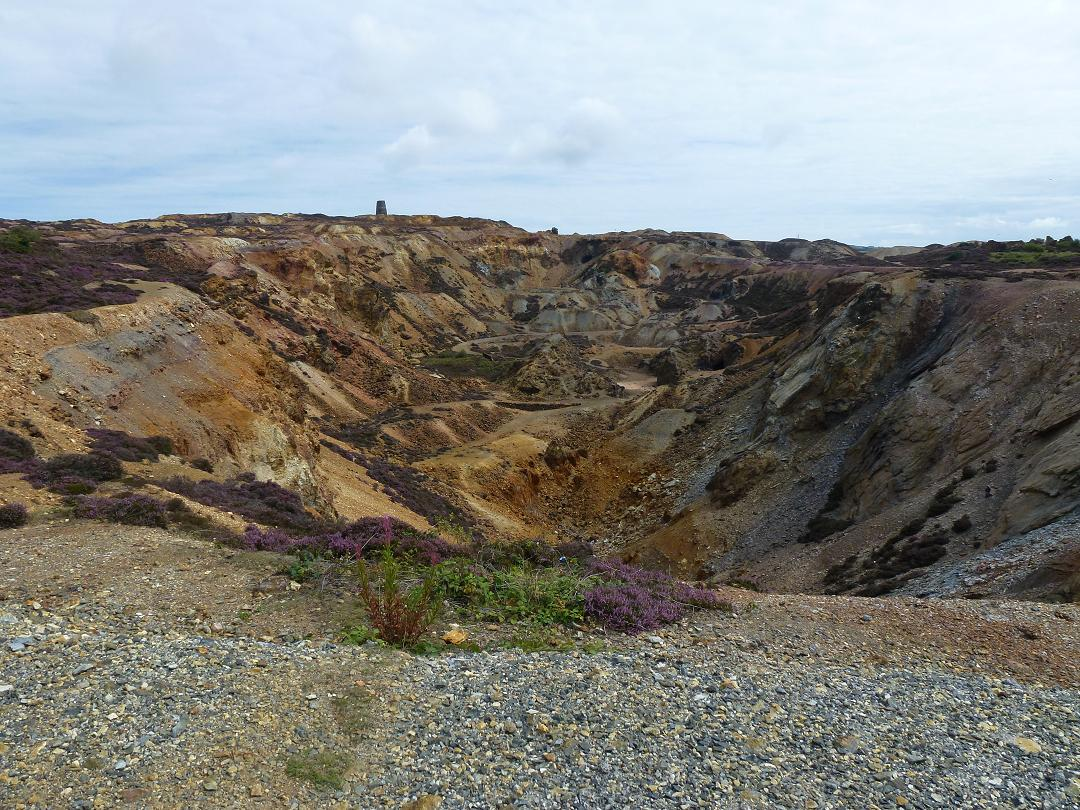
The production team scouted the quarry at Parys Mountain as a potential filming location.

"Boom" was filmed in the third production block of the fourteenth series along with "Space Babies" in March and April 2023. Julie Anne Robinson directed the episode and chose to film the episode scene-by-scene rather than out of order as typically done. Robinson also chose to film longer takes than usually done on the series, some of which lasted up to seven minutes.

The production team needed to shoot in a crater for up to 20 days. They considered filming on-location and scouted many quarries including Parys Mountain in Wales. Production designer Phil Sims ultimately decided to build the set on soundstage 6 at Wolf Studios Wales to avoid the risk of bad weather causing delays when filming. An encampment set in the episode was constructed on the backlot at Wolf Studios and utilised shipping containers and the external wall of the studio as a backdrop. The remainder of the fictional alien planet used as a setting was made using computer-generated imagery and displayed on a large LED display.

=== Casting ===
The episode featured a previously unannounced appearance by Varada Sethu, who portrayed Mundy Flynn. Sethu had previously been announced as a companion for the fifteenth series of the programme. Sethu later revealed that she was not cast for series fifteen until well after "Boom" had completed filming. When the episode was released, Davies confirmed that Sethu's companion character would not be Flynn but suggested an eventual connection between the two. Moffat compared the appearance to that of Jenna Coleman's Clara Oswald, a former companion of the Doctor, who was announced as a companion and appeared as a slightly different although connected character a year earlier than expected. On 27 July 2024, it was announced at San Diego Comic-Con that Sethu's character would be called Belinda Chandra. In "The Robot Revolution", it is revealed that Mundy is a descendant of Belinda, thus explaining the resemblance.

Susan Twist portrayed the Ambulance AI depicted in the episode. Twist had also made appearances in the preceding episodes as seemingly disparate characters. The remainder of the guest cast was made up of Joe Anderson, Majid Mehdizadeh-Valoujerdy, Caoilinn Springall, and Bhav Joshi.

== Broadcast and reception ==
Professional ratings
Aggregate scores
| Source | Rating |
|---|---|
| Rotten Tomatoes (Tomatometer) | 88% |
| Rotten Tomatoes (Average Rating) | 8/10 |
Review scores
| Source | Rating |
| Digital Spy | 4/5 stars |
| Empire | 5/5 stars |
| Evening Standard | 4/5 stars |
| i | 5/5 stars |
| IGN | 8/10 |
| Radio Times | 4/5 stars |
| The Independent | 2/5 stars |
| The Telegraph | 2/5 stars |
| Total Film | 5/5 stars |
| TV Fanatic | 4.5/5 stars |

=== Broadcast ===
In the United Kingdom, "Boom" was first released on BBC iPlayer and aired on BBC One on 18 May 2024. It was released simultaneously on Disney+ in the United States on 17 May. Disney also handled international distribution of the episode outside of the United Kingdom and Ireland.

=== Ratings ===
The episode had an overnight viewing figure of 2.04 million during its broadcast on BBC One. It was the highest-viewed programme on BBC One for the day. The episode was down almost 200 thousand viewers from the previous episode, "The Devil's Chord". The episode received a total of 3.63 million consolidated viewers across 7 days, and a total of 4.69 million consolidated viewers across 28 days.

=== Critical reception ===
On the review aggregator website Rotten Tomatoes, 88% of 17 critics' reviews are positive, with an average rating of 8/10. The website's consensus reads: "With former showrunner Steven Moffat returning for screenwriting duties, "Boom" takes great steps forward in this new duo's development even as Ncuti's Doctor stays perfectly still."

Describing the episode as "an instant classic", Total Film's Emily Murray wrote: "A simple premise beautifully executed, no one can write Doctor Who quite like Moffat – and Ncuti Gatwa has never been better." Stefan Mohamed, writing for Den of Geek, commended the episode for its simplicity, audacity, and exhilarating quality. He highlighted strong lead performances and emphasized that the high concept contributes to an engaging viewing experience, stating "The episode is expertly structured, balancing efficient and interesting world-building, horror, suspense, comedy, emotional character moments, the aforementioned future companion and some compelling themes, without any one aspect overwhelming the others". Gatwa, Gibson, and Sethu were praised for their performances, while Moffat's writing was also enjoyed by reviewers who noted the tension behind the dialogue. Gatwa stated that the episode was his favourite of the series.

Conversely, Ed Power from The Independent felt that Moffat overly contradicted himself and dealt with the episode's topics too bluntly. He also felt the Doctor to be out of character initially denouncing faith but ultimately accepting it. Additionally, Anita Singh with The Daily Telegraph argued that Disney being a co-producer had a major impact on the episode, noting that the set felt like "Star Wars leftovers" and that there was a "cute kid and a cheesy ending." Singh also did not feel the tension that the Doctor might actually get blown up in the episode, as she felt it was too early in the series for the new Doctor to regenerate. Stefan Mohamed praised the episode and performances but criticised some aspects of the writing, calling the relationship between Mundy and Canto "perfunctory", and felt Splice to be a "wooden" character. He also panned the ending as "a little too happy considering what’s gone on – we didn’t necessarily need everybody lying around sobbing, but the triumphant 'love conquers all' climax is a tad over-egged".
