= The Devil's Chord =

306 – "The Devil's Chord"
- Doctor Who episode
- Promotional title-card

Cast
- Doctor: Ncuti Gatwa – Fifteenth Doctor
- Companion: Millie Gibson – Ruby Sunday
- Others: Jinkx Monsoon – Maestro; Jeremy Limb – Timothy Drake; Kit Rakusen – Henry; Sherinne Kayra Anderson – Tea Trolley Lady; Ed White – George Martin; George Caple – Paul McCartney; Chris Mason – John Lennon; Philip Davies – George Harrison; James Hoyles – Ringo Starr; Chan Shoker – Studio Producer; Josie Sedgwick-Davies – Cilla Black; Susan Twist – Tea Lady; Simon Jason-Smith – Vinnie; Laura June Hudson – Elderly Woman; Murray Gold – Himself; Shirley Ballas – Herself; Johannes Radebe – Himself

Production
- Directed by: Ben Chessell
- Written by: Russell T Davies
- Produced by: Chris May
- Executive producers: Russell T Davies; Julie Gardner; Jane Tranter; Joel Collins; Phil Collinson
- Music by: Murray Gold
- Series: Series 14
- Running time: 49 minutes
- First broadcast: 11 May 2024

Chronology
← Preceded by "Space Babies"	Followed by → "Boom"

"The Devil's Chord" is the second episode of the fourteenth series of the British science fiction television programme Doctor Who. Released alongside "Space Babies," it was written by Russell T. Davies, directed by Ben Chessell. The episode was released on BBC iPlayer in the United Kingdom on 11 May 2024 and Disney+ in the United States on 10 May.

The story sees the Fifteenth Doctor (Ncuti Gatwa) and Ruby Sunday (Millie Gibson) go to see the British rock band the Beatles in 1963, only to find that the world has lost interest in music as they are confronted by the mysterious Maestro (Jinkx Monsoon).

"The Devil's Chord" was watched by 4.24 million viewers and received generally positive reviews from critics, who praised Monsoon’s performance.

== Plot ==
In 1925, Timothy Drake, a piano teacher and frustrated composer, shows his student the "devil's chord", which summons a being called Maestro, who consumes the teacher's musical essence, killing him in the process. Maestro then breaks the fourth wall, looking into the camera before playing the opening notes of the Doctor Who theme music.

At Ruby's request, the Doctor takes her to 1963 to see the Beatles record their first album at EMI Recording Studios, but they are disappointed during a recording session with the band as they sing a poorly composed song about Paul McCartney's dog. After viewing similar sessions with Cilla Black and an orchestra, they talk to John Lennon and McCartney and discover that the world has lost its taste for music.

Fearing the impacts of a lack of music on humanity, the Doctor has Ruby play a song on a piano which summons Maestro, who emerges from the piano while laughing. The Doctor recognises this laugh as the same as the Toymaker's giggle. (Note: As depicted in "The Giggle".)

After escaping Maestro, the Doctor takes Ruby back to 2024, discovering the ruins of London in a nuclear winter. Maestro appears and reveals that they are a child of the Toymaker. They explain that they plan to eradicate all life from the universe, leaving only Aeolian tones. Maestro claims that to defeat them, the Doctor would need to find the correct chord to banish them, believing he is incapable of doing so.

The Doctor and Ruby return to 1963 where Maestro attacks Ruby, but stops when "Carol of the Bells" begins to play and snow falls. Maestro states that this music was present on the night of her birth, saying that this power is that of the "Oldest One". Playing the Mrs. Mills piano, the Doctor tries to find the chord that will banish Maestro but is unable to find the final note of the chord. Maestro sends the piano out of the room, trapping the Doctor and Ruby inside musical instruments.

Lennon and McCartney arrive outside and discover the piano, with the discovered notes of the chord floating above it. They are able to complete the chord, causing the piano to drag Maestro inside, freeing the Doctor and Ruby. Before the lid closes, trapping them, Maestro portends the coming of "The One Who Waits" to the Doctor. Music returns, and the Doctor and Ruby engage in a musical number before leaving in the TARDIS.

== Production ==
=== Development ===
"The Devil's Chord" was written by Russell T Davies. The episode's title was revealed in December 2023 in Doctor Who Magazine, a few months prior to the reveal of the other series fourteen episodes on 31 March 2024. Davies teased that the episode would be the first of many to feature gods at war. In the episode, the Doctor makes a joke about diegetic music, which according to Davies, was not well received by the production team who repeatedly suggested cutting it. Despite this, it was well received by critics.

Davies included references to Doctor Who's first serial, An Unearthly Child (1963), as well as the twelfth series episode, "The Timeless Children" (2020). Both mentions revolved around the Doctor's granddaughter and former companion Susan Foreman. "The Devil's Chord" takes place at the same time period as An Unearthly Child, and the Doctor tells Ruby that he was living nearby in Shoreditch with Susan. He then contemplates the fate of Susan following the genocide of the Time Lords by the Master in "The Timeless Children". Susan's name is later used by the antagonist in the series finale to trick the Doctor into thinking there may be a familial connection between his granddaughter and Susan Triad, an important character in the episode.

=== Filming ===
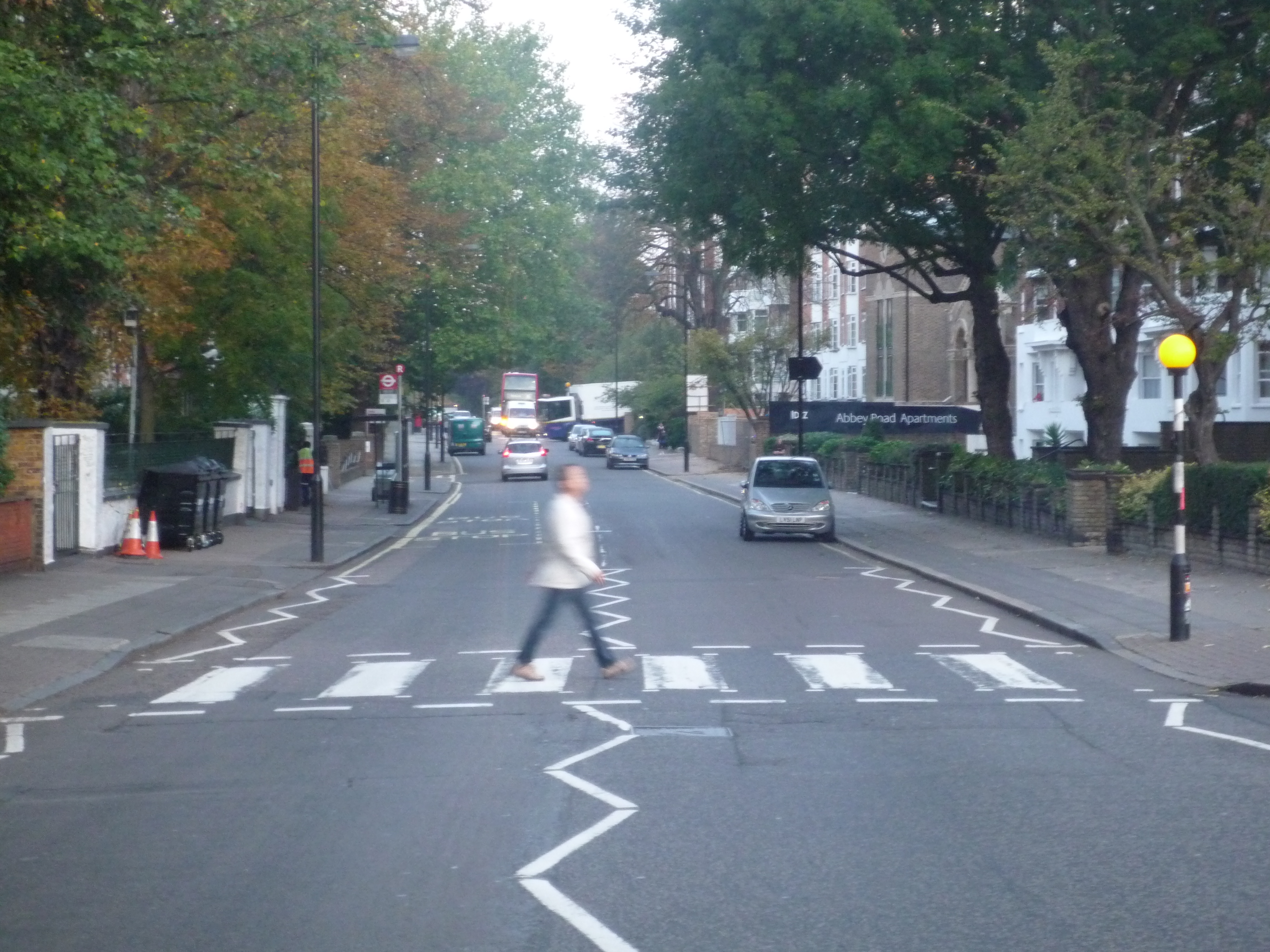
The production team used a street in Cardiff to emulate a well-known Beatles album cover photographed on Abbey Road (pictured).

The episode was directed by Ben Chessell. It was filmed in April and May 2023. "The Devil's Chord" was produced in the fourth production block of the fourteenth series along with the sixth episode, "Rogue". Parade street in Cardiff was used for the scenes that took place on Abbey Road in London. A blue screen was placed in the background which was eventually used to substitute the background for London. Umbrellas were not originally intended to be used by the actors in the episode's final scene, but rainy weather caused the production team to come up with the idea since the actors were already using the umbrellas earlier on in the episode. Two pianos were used on set, one that actually worked and one with an empty interior that could hold Monsoon. Davies stated that he had wanted to include a cabaret scene on the programme since 2005.

=== Casting ===
The episode stars Ncuti Gatwa and Millie Gibson as the Fifteenth Doctor and Ruby Sunday respectively. The episode features fictionalized versions of several musicians most notably the Beatles with Ed White, Chris Mason, George Caple, and James Hoyles as George Harrison, John Lennon, Paul McCartney and Ringo Starr respectively. Additionally, Josie Sedgwick-Davies appears as Cilla Black.

Jinkx Monsoon appears as the god Maestro. Susan Twist appears as a tea lady, having previously appeared as different characters in episodes since "Wild Blue Yonder" (2024). Twist went on to appear in every other episode of the series, cumulating in a role as Susan Triad, a creation of the finale's primary antagonist, Sutekh. Jeremy Limb appeared as Timothy Drake. Limb's father Roger, was an incidental music composer for Doctor Who during the 1980s.

The episode features several cameo appearances including Shirley Ballas and Johannes Radebe as themselves. Former Doctor Who costume designer June Hudson makes a cameo appearance as an elderly woman who is killed by Maestro. Composer Murray Gold also makes a cameo, playing the piano briefly in the final musical number.

=== Costumes ===
"The Devil's Chord" saw the Doctor and Ruby in 1960s period clothing and wigs. The Doctor's suit was inspired by images of The Rolling Stones. Costume designer Pam Downe designed three costumes for Maestro, including a keyboard outfit, a theatre dress, and an American bandleader outfit; the latter harks back to the Toymaker's bandleader appearance in "The Giggle". According to Monsoon, the looks were inspired by "iconic musicians" through history, with the theatre outfit referencing Adele, and the bandleader outfit referencing Sergeant Pepper from The Beatles.

== Broadcast and reception ==
Professional ratings
Aggregate scores
Source	Rating
Rotten Tomatoes (Tomatometer)	92%
Rotten Tomatoes (Average Score)	8.1/10
Metacritic	72/100
Review scores
Source	Rating
Radio Times	3/5 stars
The Evening Standard	4/5 stars
Total Film	4/5 stars
Vulture	4/5 stars
The Times	4/5 stars

=== Broadcast ===
"The Devil's Chord" was broadcast on BBC One on 11 May 2024, immediately following the series opener, "Space Babies". The episodes were given an early screening exclusive for critics on 6 May. The episode was simulcast on BBC iPlayer at midnight on 11 May in the UK and on Disney+ in the United States on 10 May.

=== Ratings ===
Overnight viewing figures estimate that the episode was watched by 2.4 million people on its BBC One broadcast, 200,000 less than the preceding episode. Writing for Radio Times, Louise Griffin attributed the low ratings to the episodes launch on BBC iPlayer nearly 20 hours previously. The episode received a total of 4.24 million consolidated viewers across 7 days, and a total of 5.56 million consolidated viewers across 28 days. As of 21 June 2024, "The Devil's Chord" was seen by 5.7 million viewers.

=== Critical reception ===
On the review aggregator website Rotten Tomatoes, 92% of 12 critics' reviews are positive, with an average rating of 8.1/10. The website's consensus reads: ""The Devil's Chord" gets by with a little help from some famous friends -- and a memorably villainous turn from Jinkx Monsoon as Maestro." Metacritic, which uses a weighted average, assigned the episode a score of 72 out of 100, based on 18 critics, indicating "generally favorable" reviews. Jinkx Monsoon's performance was praised by critics. (Note: Attributed to multiple sources)

Reviewing the first two episodes of the season, Total Film's Will Salmon gave them four out of five stars, finding "The Devil's Chord" to be "on surer ground and a more obviously crowd-pleasing episode" and writing "Gatwa and Gibson are brilliant, and Jinkx Monsoon crackles with malevolent energy". Hoai-Tran Bui's review from Inverse was more mixed, though she described the episode as "an intriguing marriage of high-concept sci-fi with high camp that delivers a promising look at what this new era of Doctor Who could look like." Writing for Den of Geek, Stefan Mohamed praised the episode, though he noted that the episode's continuity and references to previous episodes were inconsistent. Mohamed described the focus on music as feeling "fresh". Vulture's Jennifer Zhan enjoyed the episode, particularly the performance of Monsoon. She also praised the episode's closing musical number. Louise Griffin of Radio Times thought the episode was "vivid, silly, gripping".
