= Space Babies =

305 – "Space Babies"
- Doctor Who episode
- Promotional title-card

Cast
- Doctor: Ncuti Gatwa – Fifteenth Doctor
- Companion: Millie Gibson – Ruby Sunday
- Others: Golda Rosheuvel – Jocelyn Sancerre; Michelle Greenidge – Carla Sunday; Angela Wynter – Cherry Sunday; Mason McCumskey – Eric; Sami Amber – Voice of Eric; Sienna-Robyn Mavanga-Phipps – Poppy; Shola Olaitan-Ajiboye – Voice of Poppy; Cadence Williams – Voice of Sandra; Param Patel – Voice of Marcel; Lonnee Archibong – Voice of Adjani; Jesus Reyes Ortiz – Rico Trieste; Yasmine Bouabid – Lucia Colasanto; Robert Strange – Bogeyman; Susan Twist – Comms Officer Gina Scalzi (uncredited)

Production
- Directed by: Julie Anne Robinson
- Written by: Russell T Davies
- Produced by: Vicki Delow
- Executive producers: Russell T Davies; Julie Gardner; Jane Tranter; Joel Collins; Phil Collinson; Julie Anne Robinson
- Music by: Murray Gold
- Series: Series 14
- Running time: 46 minutes
- First broadcast: 11 May 2024

Chronology
← Preceded by "The Church on Ruby Road"	Followed by → "The Devil's Chord"

"Space Babies" is the first episode of the fourteenth series of the British science fiction television programme Doctor Who. It was written by Russell T Davies and directed by Julie Anne Robinson. The episode was released alongside the next episode, "The Devil's Chord", on BBC iPlayer in the United Kingdom on 11 May 2024 and in the United States on Disney+ on 10 May 2024. A broadcast on BBC One followed later in the evening on 11 May.

The episode, which takes place immediately after the events of "The Church on Ruby Road", follows an alien time traveller known as the Doctor (Ncuti Gatwa) and his companion Ruby Sunday (Millie Gibson), as they travel to a space station and discover a baby farm. Together, they learn that the babies are under threat by a creature dubbed "the Bogeyman".

Davies wrote "Space Babies" as a soft reboot, to serve as an introductory episode for new viewers. It was filmed throughout March and April 2023. The episode was watched by 4.62 million viewers and was met with generally positive reviews from critics. A novelisation written by Alison Rumfitt was released on 8 August 2024.

== Plot ==
The Doctor explains the TARDIS and his history to Ruby. The two travel 150 million years prior to what will become Green River, Wyoming. Ruby steps on a butterfly and changes form. The Doctor saves the butterfly, restoring Ruby to human form.

The pair then travel to a future space station, where they run into a monstrous creature. They find an elevator and reach the higher level, only to discover that the ship is a baby farm, run by talking babies. The babies live in fear of the creature down below, which they have dubbed the Bogeyman, and their only caregiver is supposedly an AI named NAN-E. The Doctor traces NAN-E's programming to a storage room but discovers that it is actually a woman named Jocelyn. She is the last of the ship's original crew who were forced to leave the ship and the babies behind despite their protests against it. The Doctor locates a refugee planet nearby and vows to send Jocelyn and the space babies to it. During this, the Doctor experiences a vision of himself on the night that Ruby's birth mother abandoned her on Ruby Road, with the hooded woman pointing ominously at him; snow then inexplicably begins to fall inside the space station, leaving him disturbed by his vision and wondering who Ruby's birth mother is.

One of the babies, Eric, summons the courage to face the Bogeyman. The Doctor, Ruby, and the rest of the babies come to his rescue. The Doctor finds the Bogeyman's appearance mysterious as he has the urge to run away from it. After finding the ship's programming, he discovers that the ship had created the Bogeyman as part of its misguided attempt to entertain the children and that the Bogeyman is made out of actual bogies. Jocelyn has the Doctor and Ruby lead the Bogeyman to the airlock so she can eject it into space, but Ruby points out that the creature appeared the same time the babies were born, thus it is actually one of them. Ruby stops Jocelyn and the Doctor rescues the Bogeyman; the babies recondition it to behave like a dog.

The Doctor manages to get the ship up and running so that it can fly to the refugee planet. The Doctor gives Ruby a key to the TARDIS and invites her to come travel with him. His only condition is that they do not visit the night her birth mother abandoned her, fearful of creating a paradox if they were to change the history of that night. As they return to her adoptive family, the Doctor performs a DNA scan on an unsuspecting Ruby and then leaves the TARDIS, as it suddenly begins to snow inside.

== Production ==
=== Development ===
Davies wrote the episode as an introduction for new viewers. Despite this, it was described as being "one for the OG fans". When writing the episode, Davies intended to open the series on a lighter tone. The primary antagonist for the episode was inspired by the Bogeyman and within the universe of the show, was created by bogies. Some scenes paralleled those from Davies's first run on Doctor Who, namely "The End of the World" (2005). Davies also said he tried to create differences between the first companion he created, Rose Tyler, and Ruby, noting how Ruby was aware of finances and asked how much a phone call in outer space would cost, something that Rose wouldn't do. He also explained that there were "no Disney notes" in the episode, particularly in relation to babies brandishing flamethrowers, noting that "they're just as much up for this adventure the rest of us are".

=== Filming ===
The read-through for "Space Babies" took place on 1 March 2023, at Wolf Studios Wales, Cardiff. The episode was directed by Julie Anne Robinson. It was produced in the series's third block alongside the third episode "Boom" in March and April 2023. For Ruby's prehistoric prosthetic, the production team attempted to create something similar to the Silurians but were instructed by Davies to make the prosthetic appear cute. Twenty real infants were used and were occasionally replaced with dolls due to UK child labour law and actors' union restrictions. CGI was used for their mouth movements. Reportedly the dolls used scared the cast. Some of the baby strollers were pushed by men in green suits. All the space station sets were built on Stage 3 at Wolf Studios Wales, "The round control room was partially encircled by a curving length of corridor, with the laboratory and other rooms leading off it." The fake snot used while filming was created by moulding liquid latex and using a hairdryer to provide texture. It was then painted to obtain the proper colour. A mixture of resin and glycerine was used for the liquid portion.

=== Casting ===
The episode features Ncuti Gatwa and Millie Gibson as the Fifteenth Doctor and Ruby Sunday respectively. Sami Amber voiced baby Eric. Lenny Rush was originally cast in this role, but after being impressed by his performance the production team decided to withdraw him from the role in favour of the UNIT scientific advisor, Morris Gibbons in "The Legend of Ruby Sunday"/"Empire of Death. Michelle Greenidge and Angela Wynter reprised their roles as Carla and Cherry Sunday, respectively. Robert Strange portrayed the Bogeyman. The episode features Susan Twist as Comms Officer Gina though she goes uncredited. Twist returned in every episode of the series as seemingly separate characters.

== Broadcast and reception ==
Professional ratings
Aggregate scores
Source	Rating
Rotten Tomatoes (Tomatometer)	92%
Rotten Tomatoes (Average Rating)	6.8/10
Review scores
Source	Rating
i	3/5 stars
Radio Times	3/5 stars
The Guardian	(Note: Reviewed with "The Devil's Chord")
The Independent	4/5 stars
Vulture	3/5 stars

=== Broadcast ===
"Space Babies" was first released in the United Kingdom on BBC iPlayer on 11 May 2024 and in the United States on Disney+ on 10 May; followed by a broadcast on BBC One at 6:20 pm. The episode was released alongside "The Devil's Chord" which aired immediately after. The episodes were given an early screening exclusive for critics on 6 May. The episode is the first non-special to air since the thirteenth series finale "The Vanquishers" (2021).

Disney+ handled international distribution of the episode outside of the United Kingdom and Ireland.

=== Ratings ===
Overnight viewing figures estimate that the episode was watched by 2.6 million people on its BBC One broadcast, 200,000 more than the following episode. Louise Griffin from Radio Times attributed the low ratings to the episode's launch on BBC iPlayer nearly twenty hours previously. Griffin stated that it was likely that the episode was viewed by significantly more people. The episode received a total of 4.62 million consolidated viewers across 7 days, and a total of 5.70 million consolidated viewers across 28 days. As of 21 June 2024, "Space Babies" was seen by 5.9 million viewers.

=== Critical reception ===
On the review aggregator website Rotten Tomatoes, 92% of 13 critics' reviews are positive, with an average rating of 6.8/10. The website's consensus reads: "Starting things off on a buoyant and eccentric note, 'Space Babies' is an intergalactic bundle of joy as far as introductions go."

Jack Seale of The Guardian described the episode as "a textbook example of a mid-ranking Who instalment, fun but forgettable and, ultimately, not making sense". He labelled Davies's political and personal messages as "awkward", and noted that the episode's allegory about the rollback of abortion rights in the United States was "accompanied by the deafening scrape of a crowbar". Despite this, he praised the performances of Gatwa and Gibson. Stephen Kelly from i similarly called it forgettable, stating that the episode felt "a tad too lightweight and kitsch" and was too similar to "The Church on Ruby Road". He also had mixed feelings on the plot, particularly with regards to the Bogeyman's change of character, which he believed to be "so jarringly sudden" that he wondered whether a scene was missing. Writing for The Independent, Ed Power felt that the episode had "a promising idea that never entirely comes to life on screen". Den of Geek writer Stefan Mohamed praised the way in which the episode followed up on the "Timeless Child" plotline, but was critical of the episode's CGI effects.

Inverse's Bui Tran-Hoai believed the episode to be a "mixed bag", describing it as "an outrageously goofy sci-fi adventure" that spends too long establishing the Doctor Who premise to its new Disney+ viewers, leaving long-term fans to "twiddle their thumbs as they wait for the good stuff". Reviewing the episode for the Radio Times, Morgan Jeffery believed the story to be simple, but felt that it should nonetheless please both new and returning viewers. Vulture's Jennifer Zhan noted the allegory between the thematic element of the baby farm and the overturning of Roe v. Wade in the United States. Zhan believed that some plot elements in the episode did not make sense, and criticised the CGI animations of the babies's facial movements.

== Home media ==
"Space Babies" was included on the DVD and Blu-ray release of Doctor Who's fourteenth series, which was released on 12 August 2024.

=== In print ===
Space Babies
- Author: Alison Rumfitt
- Series: Doctor Who book: Target novelisations
- Publisher: BBC Books
- Publication date: 8 August 2024
- Pages: 192
- ISBN: 9781785948848

A novelisation of the episode was written by Alison Rumfitt and made available for pre-order in May 2024. It was released in paperback on 8 August 2024 as part of the Target collection. An audiobook, read by Clare Corbett, was released the same day.
