= June Hudson =

British television costume designer and actress (born 1933)

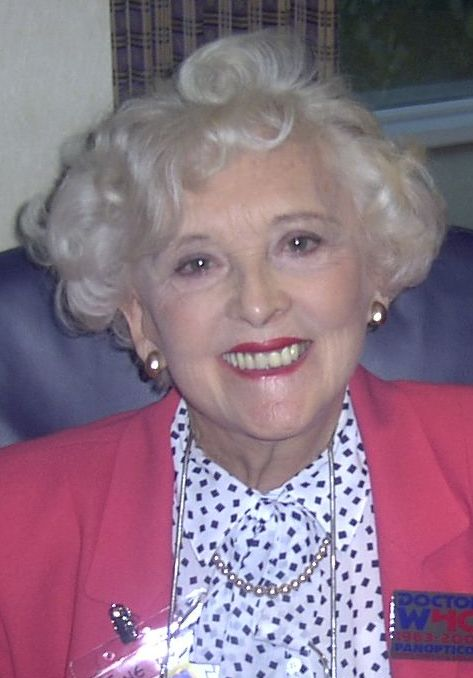
- Hudson in 2003
- Born: 12 January 1933 (age 93)
- Occupations: Costume designer and actress
- Known for: Doctor Who

June Hudson (born 12 January 1933), sometimes credited as June Wilson, is a British television costume designer and actress. She’s known for her work on various science fiction TV series’ in the 1970s, such as Doctor Who and Blake's 7. She has been described as "Doctor Who royalty ... one of the most highly regarded costume designers ever to work on the series".

June Hudson studied theatre design at the Royal College of Art. She worked as an assistant to Oliver Messel before starting at ATV studios in Hertfordshire in 1962, then joining the BBC in 1965.

Hudson was an in-house designer at the BBC until 1990, and created costumes for sitcom Are You Being Served? and soap opera EastEnders. Hudson explained that "a lot of the costume designer's work is actually foraging: rummaging around in odd little boutiques, second-hand shops, and surplus stores". When describing the appeal of television, June said "I love expressing humour in clothes, seeking out elements of the costume that are amusing not just in the obvious, but aso the subtext, the subtle things which the audience will recognise subconsciously".

== Early BBC work ==
In the early 1970s, Hudson was living in Chiswick and working at the BBC, part of a team of sixty designers.

== Doctor Who ==
Hudson started designing costumes for Doctor Who in 1978 and was principal costume designer for the series from 1979–1981. In their history of television design, Piers Britton and Simon Barker have noted June Hudson's "imaginative approach" to costuming the long-running series.

Her initial productions were "The Ribos Operation" (1978) and "The Creature from the Pit" (1979). Hudson later explained her use of colour in the series to meet practical and narrative requirements:

Black in particular has certain practical advantages for the designer; there is a great deal of fabrics with different textures available in black, and literally hundreds of slightly different shades. Above all I like it because it gives a good outline – a strong silhouette is very important for science fiction design... blue I generally avoided for aliens in science fiction, because it was used as the key colour for Overlay effects".

Her costume designs for Lalla Ward's portrayal of Romana have been described as "attractive but eccentric attire", for the tom-boyish character, which adapted masculine dress and even pastiched the Doctor's own famous outfit, in a subversion of the usual over-feminized appearance of the women assisting Doctor Who.

For the episode "Warriors' Gate" (1981), Hudson created the "monstrous" Tharils, based on hints in the script. She envisioned them as "tremendously masculine, swashbuckling" pirate-lion characters, and developed a faux-suede jerkin garment in a buff colour.

The producer of the series, John Nathan-Turner, asked Hudson to update and streamline the Doctor's iconic look for the 1980-1 season, which gave her "grave reservations". As a result, she simplified the multi-colour costume into a monochrome outfit, but retained the silhouette and layering of wide coat and long scarf.

Working to tight budgets, "her best work was characterised by lateral thinking", and Hudson had to combine custom-made items with cheaper ready-made ones that were less visible. She frequently commissioned costumes from outworkers, notably Roger Oldhamstead, who would fabricate armour and jewellery to her designs.

Hudson appeared in the 2009 "frockumentary" Lalla's Wardrobe, talking about her work creating Romana's costumes for the actor Lalla Ward.

== Blake's 7 ==
Hudson's contributions to science fiction show Blake's 7 began with the second series, known as Series B, in 1979. Her entry to the series brought "dozens of new and unique costumes all round". John Muir, a historian of Blake's 7, questioned whether it was necessary "in an ostensibly gritty series for the protagonists to sport an endless array of attractive costumes?" and opined that the costumes represented a "believability hurdle".

Nevertheless, Muir highlights the costumes for Episode 20, "Killer" as "fantastic, weird, and unlike anything else seen on genre television at the time, or even now". The costumes in discussion were the leather vests and ponchos uniforms worn by the Federation personnel, white vinyl scientists with insect-like plastic capes and safety suits made from modified Michelin Man costumes worn by the recovery crew. These are all credited for "escaping twentieth century fashion sensibilities".

June Hudson was interviewed about her costume designs for the season for the Blake's 7 DVD release, and gave background information about several other costumes from the series. In the episode "Weapon", the characters Servalan, Coser, Rashel, and Clonemaster Fen all have large, elaborately decorated collars, and Servalan wears the same white feather cloak as Romana in "The Ribos Operation" episode of Doctor Who. Avon's "lobster suit," made of quilted crimson leather, proved difficult with producers, directors, and the actor himself; the original costume included conical spikes on the collar, originally designed to symbolize the character's angry nature, but were removed at the insistence of the producer.

== EastEnders ==
June Hudson was the first costume designer for EastEnders, a soap opera launched in 1985. She was chosen for her experience, and told it was time for her to do "something mundane" after years of science fiction and period drama.

Upon the show's thirtieth anniversary in 2015, Hudson recalled disagreements in the early days about the overall look of the programme. The show's creator, Julia Smith, expected all the costumes to come from charity shops, but Hudson disagreed:

I’d done my homework – weeks of research in the East End, in Ridley Road and Roman Road markets. I noticed how bright and fashionable the people were. I felt I had to make a stand with Julia over the look, the brightness of real East Enders. It was all about pride and image in the East End in the early 80s.

The budget for the first series was £700 for each of the 23 regular characters, for an entire wardrobe including underwear, shoes and jewellery, for every weather and season. Hudson had to establish a new wardrobe department and costume store at the new BBC base at Elstree Studios to dress the programme.

== Acting credits ==
She took on minor roles in an episode of the 2016 spin-off Class and a 2024 episode of Doctor Who, "The Devil's Chord." Other credits included the sitcoms This Country and Ricky Gervais's Derek. Film roles include 'Outraged Woman' in the British comedy Wicked Little Letters (2023).

== Teaching work ==
June Hudson has lectured on costume design and character creation at the National Film Theatre, University of Manchester, and the National Museum of Photography, Film and Television.

On several occasions, Hudson has been Lossett Visiting Scholar at the University of Redlands in Southern California, teaching design for science fiction television.
