= Julie Anne Robinson =

British film and television director

- Born: August 8, 1975 (age 51); Great Britain, United Kingdom
- Occupations: Television director, film director, producer
- Years active: 1998–present

Julie Anne Robinson (born August 8, 1975) is a British theatre, television, film director and producer based in the United States and United Kingdom.

== Career ==
Robinson first directed television in the U.K. After shadowing on Grey's Anatomy, Robinson made her U.S. directing debut, for an episode of the show.

She worked for Bridgerton, Masters of Sex, Nurse Jackie, Orange is the New Black, Grace and Frankie, Castle Rock, Parks and Recreation, The Good Place and Selfie. She has directed twelve network television pilots in the United States, seven of which have gone to series. She developed and executive produced The Catch, with Shonda Rhimes. During 2023 she directed (and was also listed as an Executive Producer on) two episodes of Series 14 of Doctor Who: namely “Space Babies” and “Boom”.

She has directed two features, One for the Money (2012) and The Last Song (2010).

Robinson founded CannyLads Productions in the United States.

Robinson co-founded Longboat Pictures in the United Kingdom with former ITV Controller of Drama, Victoria Fea.

Robinson has been nominated for two BAFTAs and a Golden Globe for her work as a director.

Robinson directed 2 episodes of the Netflix 2026 series Little House on the Prairie.

== Personal life ==
Julie Anne Robinson lives in Los Angeles, CA.

In 2017, Sean Maguire and Robinson organized a Syrian refugee benefit in Los Angeles.

== Filmography ==
=== Television series ===
- Little House on the Prairie (2026)
- The Hunting Wives (2025)
- Doctor Who (2024)
- Partner Track (2022)
- Bridgerton (2020)
- On Becoming a God in Central Florida (2019)
- I Feel Bad (2018)
- Castle Rock (2018)
- A.P. Bio (2018)
- The Good Place (2018)
- I'm Dying Up Here (2017)
- The Last Tycoon (2017)
- Masters of Sex (2016)
- Roadies (2016)
- The Catch (2016)
- Manhattan (2014–2015)
- Orange Is the New Black (2015)
- Grace and Frankie (2015)
- Nurse Jackie (2015)
- Scandal (2013–2014)
- Selfie (2014)
- Suburgatory (2012–2014)
- Brooklyn Nine-Nine (2013–2014)
- The Middle (2009–2014)
- Parks and Recreation (2013)
- How to Live with Your Parents (For the Rest of Your Life) (2013)
- Weeds (2007–2012)
- 2 Broke Girls (2012)
- Pan Am (2011)
- Scoundrels (2010)
- Pushing Daisies (2009)
- Big Love (2009)
- Grey's Anatomy (2006–2009)
- Emily's Reasons Why Not (2008)
- Samantha Who? (2008)
- Private Practice (2007)
- Goldplated (2006)
- Girls on the Bus (2006)
- Holby City (2001–2005)
- Blackpool (2004)
- No Angels (2004)
- Cutting It (2002)
- Doctors (2000–2001)

=== Feature films ===
- One for the Money (2012)
- The Last Song (2010)

== Awards and nominations ==
Year	Award	Category	Work	Result	Ref.
2005	British Academy Television Awards	Best Drama Serial	Blackpool	Nominated	
2006	Golden Globe Awards	Best Miniseries or Motion Picture Made for Television	Viva Blackpool	Nominated	
2008	British Academy Television Awards	Best Single Drama	Coming Down the Mountain	Nominated	
2015	People's Choice Awards	Favorite New TV Comedy	Selfie	Nominated	
2021	Directors Guild of America Awards	Outstanding Directional Achievement in Dramatic Series	Bridgerton	Nominated	
2021	Primetime Emmy Awards	Outstanding Directing for a Drama Series	Bridgerton	Nominated	
