= Ruby Sunday =

Fictional character from Doctor Who

- Doctor Who character
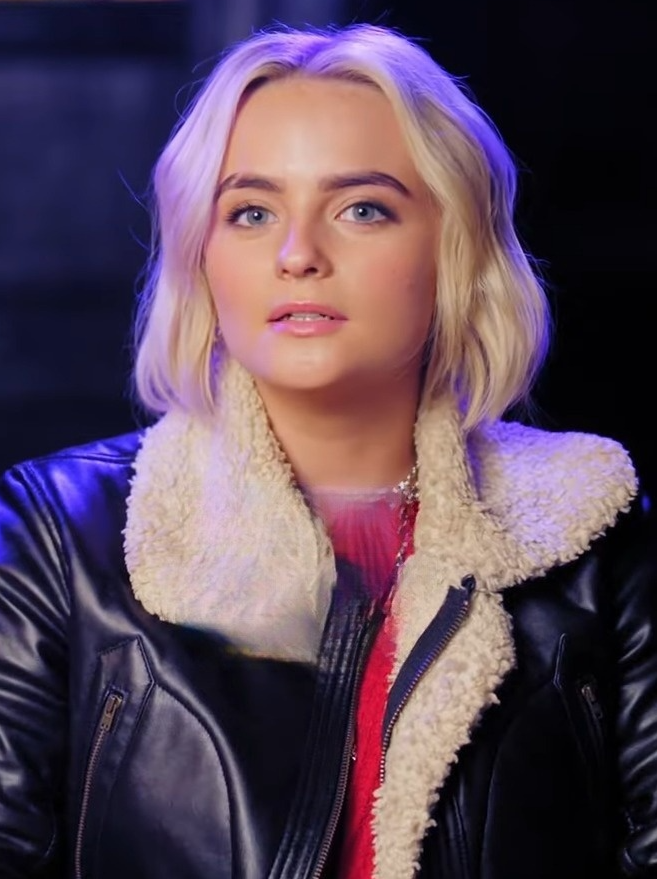
- Millie Gibson as Ruby Sunday
- First appearance: "The Church on Ruby Road" (2023)
- Last appearance: "The Reality War" (2025)
- Created by: Russell T Davies
- Portrayed by: Millie Gibson; Amanda Walker (old)
- Duration: 2023–2025

In-universe information
- Species: Human
- Gender: Female
- Affiliation: Fifteenth Doctor; UNIT
- Family: Carla Sunday (adoptive mother); Louise Miller (biological mother); William Garnet (biological father); Joe Sunday (adoptive brother)
- Relatives: Cherry Sunday (adoptive grandmother)
- Origin: Manchester, England
- Home: Earth
- Home era: 21st century

Ruby Sunday is a fictional character in the British science fiction television series Doctor Who, portrayed by Millie Gibson. She was created by Russell T Davies for the show's fourteenth series, starting with the Christmas special, "The Church on Ruby Road" (2023), Ruby serves as the companion to the Fifteenth Doctor (Ncuti Gatwa), an incarnation of the alien time traveller known as the Doctor. Ruby is a foundling, left on the doorstep of a church by her mother as a baby, with her mother's identity being unknown. After an encounter with the Doctor, the pair travel through time and space in multiple episodes, all while Ruby attempts to discover the identity of her birth mother. This eventually culminates in the two-part finale of the season, "The Legend of Ruby Sunday" and "Empire of Death" (both 2024), in which Ruby discovers the identity of her birth mother as Louise Miller (Faye McKeever), an ordinary woman, and the two reunite. Ruby departs to spend time with her family.

Gibson was cast as Ruby in 2022. She characterised Ruby as being a positive, selfless character, who had a strong bond with the Doctor. Her arc of finding out the identity of her mother was inspired by the Star Wars film series character Rey, a character believed to be a nobody until she was revealed to be a descendent of the character Emperor Palpatine. Davies wanted to subvert the trope of a character secretly being "special", or having important parentage, and thus made Ruby and her mother normal people who are victims of extraordinary events.

Ruby returned in the series fifteen episode "Lucky Day" (2025), in which she is struggling with post-traumatic stress disorder following her time with the Doctor. She gets into a relationship with podcaster Conrad Clark (Jonah Hauer-King), who is secretly using her to discredit the military organisation UNIT. Gibson described her appearance in this episode as showing a more "grown up" character, being less open than she had been in the prior season. Following "Lucky Day", she appears in the two-part season finale: "Wish World" and "The Reality War" (both 2025), where she aids the Doctor in saving Earth from both Conrad and the Doctor's old enemy The Rani.

Ruby has received a largely positive reception from critics, with Gibson's performance being praised.

== Appearances ==
Doctor Who is a long-running British science-fiction television series that began in 1963. It stars its protagonist, The Doctor, an alien who travels through time and space in a ship known as the TARDIS, as well as their travelling companions. When the Doctor dies, they can undergo a process known as "regeneration", completely changing the Doctor's appearance and personality. Throughout their travels, the Doctor often comes into conflict with various alien species and antagonists.

Ruby Sunday is introduced in the 2023 Christmas special "The Church on Ruby Road". The story depicts Ruby as a baby in the year 2004 being abandoned on the doorstep of a church on Ruby Road by her birth mother. Ruby is taken in and fostered by Carla Sunday (Michelle Greenidge), and after the Police's appeal to find her birth parents fails, she adopts Ruby. Though Ruby enlists the help of Davina McCall to find her birth parents, McCall is unable to turn up anything regarding the identity of Ruby's parents. Soon after, Goblins arrive and kidnap another newborn foster child being cared for by Carla, and she teams up with the Fifteenth Doctor (Ncuti Gatwa) to rescue the child. Due to the Doctor and Ruby's efforts to thwart this initial attempt, the Goblins travel back in time to kidnap an infant Ruby instead, leading to the Doctor going back in time to stop them and save Ruby.

Ruby subsequently travels with the Doctor in the episodes "Space Babies", where she aids the Doctor in solving the mystery of a mysterious Bogeyman aboard a spaceship, "The Devil's Chord", where she helps defeat the God of Music, Maestro (Jinkx Monsoon), and in "Boom", she helps the Doctor safely get off a landmine which threatens to kill him, and the planet as a result. In "73 Yards", the Doctor disappears after breaking a fairy circle, leaving her on her own with a mysterious woman who scares off any who interact with the woman. Ruby spends many years alone, eventually thwarting the efforts of far-right Prime Minister Roger ap Gwilliam (Aneurin Barnard), who threatens to bring the world to the brink of nuclear war, by making him interact with the woman, who makes him run off in terror. Ruby eventually dies of old age, at which point the figure approaches her; time resets as it's revealed Ruby was the woman all along, with Ruby preventing the Doctor's disappearance. Ruby subsequently appears in "Dot and Bubble" as she assists the Doctor in rescuing an Earth colony of young people from the slug-like Man-Traps. It is revealed that this community are actually white supremacists and choose inevitable death in the outside world in their intentions to colonise the planet, shunning the Doctor. Ruby supports the Doctor though his heartbreak on learning their racially-motivated dislike for him. In "Rogue", the Doctor has taken her to a party in Bath, England in 1813 and she meets a shy young woman named Emily (Camilla Aiko) with whom she develops a friendship while the Doctor meets and flirts with Rogue (Jonathan Groff). Together, they stop an invasion of Chuldur - one of whom is revealed to be Emily - and Rogue is lost in the effort to save Ruby. Ruby supports the Doctor through the loss, further cementing their closeness and friendship.

In the two-parter "The Legend of Ruby Sunday" and "Empire of Death", Ruby is aided by military organization UNIT in finding out the identity of her birth mother using a device called a Time Window, which lets Ruby view inside of a reconstructed version of the past. The initial usage fails due to the interruption of the God of Death, Sutekh (Gabriel Woolf), but Ruby goes back inside. Sutekh once again interferes, having killed the entire universe, but she, the Doctor, and Mel Bush (Bonnie Langford) escape using a TARDIS constructed from Ruby's memories. The group head to future Earth to find information on Ruby's birth mother, as they surmise that it is a key to defeating Sutekh, whose identity is also concealed from the god. Sutekh drags the three back to the present, where Ruby helps the Doctor defeat Sutekh by leashing him to the TARDIS and having him reverse the damage he did across time and space. Ruby eventually discovers the identity of her birth mother, revealed to be an ordinary woman named Louise (Faye McKeever), who surrendered Ruby because she feared for her safety, as her step-father was abusive and Louise was only a teenager. The two reunite, and Ruby leaves the Doctor to spend time with her.

Ruby reappears in "Lucky Day", depicting her life after leaving the Doctor. Ruby begins dating a conspiracy theorist and podcaster named Conrad Clark (Jonah Hauer-King), but Conrad betrays her, revealing he is part of a group that seeks to discredit UNIT and the idea of aliens. Ruby and UNIT are able to discredit Conrad after releasing an alien hunting him called the Shreek, which forces him to admit he lied in order to be saved. Ruby later appears in the two-part finale, "Wish World" and "The Reality War". After the Doctor's enemy and fellow Time Lord the Rani (Archie Panjabi and Anita Dobson) alters reality into a heteronormative society fuelled by Conrad's wish to the God of Wishes Desiderium, Ruby, unlike the others, retains memory of the previous reality (thanks to remnants of memory from "73 Yards") and works to fight against Conrad. She aids the Doctor in stopping the Rani by teleporting into the Rani's base, where she uses Desiderium to wish Conrad to have a happy life and then to end the wished reality. All seems initially to have returned to normal. However, when the Doctor and his companion Belinda Chandra's child from the altered reality, Poppy (Sienna-Robyn Mavanga-Phipps), is erased from existence, Ruby is still able to remember Poppy and is able to convince the Doctor to save her by reminding him of the events from the day they met when she ceased to exist, leading to the Doctor regenerating (into a Rose Tyler-resembling incarnation) in the time vortex to bring Poppy back to the proper reality.

In 2024, she appeared in multiple series 14 tie-in comic strips with the Fifteenth Doctor that were published in Doctor Who Magazine. She also appears in a Titan Comics published comic book ("Everyone Must Go"), where she and the Fifteenth Doctor face off against recurring enemies, the Cybermen. She also appears in three New Series Adventure novels ("Ruby Red", "Caged", and "Eden Rebellion"), and a short story published by Puffin Books in which she encounters Shirley Jackson alongside the Fifteenth Doctor ("Icons: Shirley Jackson and the Chaos Box"). She is also the featured companion in two Fifteenth Doctor audio novels published by BBC books ("On Ghost Beach" and "Sting of the Sasquatch").

== Casting and development ==
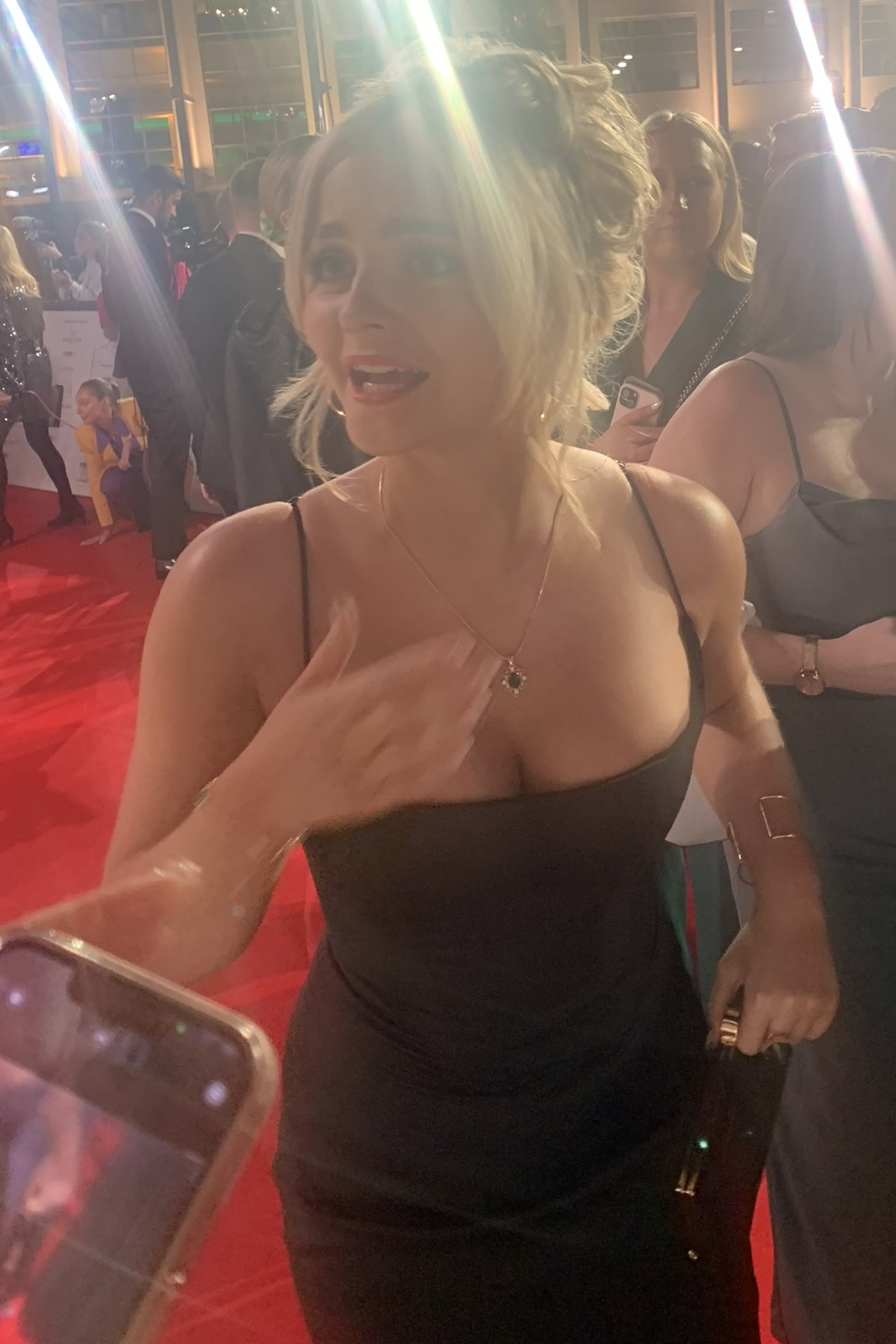
Actress Millie Gibson (pictured) portrays Ruby in the series

Auditions for the Fifteenth Doctor's companion took place on 24 September 2022. In Russell T Davies' 2026 memoir The Queerest of Folk, Davies stated that he noticed Millie Gibson via her role in Coronation Street and he noted that "[the writers] love this actor" through the large variety of storylines she was given. He decided to audition her for the role of Gatwa's first companion the day after she left the soap. He also stated in the book that they then "put her together with Ncuti [Gatwa] and it was magical". Gibson stated she was given "three adjectives" to base the character on in the audition process: charismatic, bubbly, and positive. Gibson was chosen through the audition process, with her agents confirming to her that she got the part shortly before her appearance at the National Television Awards. On 18 November 2022, during Children in Need, Gibson was announced as the new companion Ruby Sunday. Gibson stated that Ruby's character was "very bubbly, very positive", and that "she has a certain innocence to her" as well as her style being described as "punky" and pulled "off the rack in a charity shop" (Doctor Who Magazine #586). She described the relationship between Ruby and the Doctor as being akin to "two girls in school, giggling and gossiping", with the two being "platonic best friends" who were constantly laughing. She also characterised Ruby as "fighting for the underdog" and being selfless in her actions. Gibson continued to develop Ruby's character throughout the series, and attempted to play Ruby unlike any character Gibson had played before, as well as unlike any past companion in the series. Jess Barfoot acted as Gibson's stunt double.

Ruby's character arc during her first season on the show focused on the mystery of her mother's identity; this arc was resolved by revealing her mother to be a regular person. Davies stated he was inspired by the divisive response to the identity of Rey's parentage in the Star Wars film series, in which Rey's parents are initially stated to be "nobodies" before being revealed to be a descendant of the character Emperor Palpatine. Wanting to subvert the trope of a character being intrinsically "special" or having mysterious powers, Davies elected to make Ruby and her mother completely normal individual who extraordinary things happen to instead.

In November 2023, it was initially reported that Gibson would stay for the fifteenth series, however in January 2024, it was reported that Gibson would be stepping back into a part-time role, to be replaced by Varada Sethu as new companion Belinda Chandra. Revealed by Davies, the reason for this came once the plotline involving Poppy had been conceived, particularly in its resolution of the girl becoming Belinda's own child. On the less conflict-riddled dynamic between the Fifteenth Doctor and Ruby, Davies stated he wanted a companion "who could b*llock [the Doctor] more" and was "a little older [than Ruby]" to inherit the Poppy storyline. However confusion came within the fandom when, in April 2024, it was announced that Gibson and Sethu would appear concurrently throughout the series, with Davies stating that Ruby's character had been conceived around a two-series arc, though this comes as a result of her Earth-bound arc, which cemented her still as a main cast member. Gibson appears in the fourth, seventh and eighth episodes of the series: "Lucky Day", "Wish World" and "The Reality War" and has a key role in the resolution of the finale. These announcements came at the same time as it was announced that Gibson had been cast in the 5 and PBS adaptation of The Forsyte Saga, also announced in April, ahead of filming beginning in May.

Gibson revealed that series 15 would explore Ruby's life after travelling with the Doctor, which she described as unique to the series and "such a beautiful and clever thing to do". Gibson explained that her appearance in "Lucky Day" (2025), an episode which focuses predominantly on Ruby and not on the Doctor, had Ruby depicted as "more grown up", which was corroborated by episode writer Pete McTighe in Doctor Who: Unleashed. It shows that the character is "recovering" from her trips and experiences with the Doctor, with Ruby suffering from PTSD. Paste Magazine characterised her as "lonelier, less trusting, and more guarded" than she had been in series 14. "Lucky Day" also featured more scenes between Ruby and Kate Lethbridge-Stewart (Jemma Redgrave), which according to Gibson brought out the latter's "motherly side". Gibson characterised Ruby at the end of "Lucky Day" as someone trying to heal, particularly from the wounds given to Ruby by Conrad's betrayal in the episode. Following her departure from the series, Gibson has said that she hopes to reprise her role in the future, stating that she would return even if it was only a "nod to the next Doctor".

== Reception ==
Following her introduction, Ruby Sunday was positively received by critics. Empire's Jordan King praised the character's dynamics with Gatwa's Fifteenth Doctor and commented that there was "more than enough in Gibson's performance to suggest far greater depths yet for her to explore with the character." Ed Power from The Independent mentioned that Gibson's performance made her "immediately likeable", calling Ruby "a wonderful new companion". Polygon's Joshua Rivera highlighted Gibson's performance in the episode, believing it helped firmly establish Ruby's character without falling into the trope of being a love interest, or a character with a "puzzle box" mystery arc that needed to be solved. Gibson's performance in "73 Yards" was positively highlighted by several critics.

Emily Murray, writing for GamesRadar+, positively responded to the resolution of Ruby's arc. She believed the message that those who were ordinary were just as special as the extraordinary was a much more impactful message for viewers than if Ruby had turned out to be the daughter of a pre-established or powerful character. Louise Griffin from Radio Times felt that Ruby's arc was rushed, with smaller character moments needed to flesh out her relationship with the Doctor not being present enough within the series. Griffin also felt Ruby's arc ended in an anti-climax due to a lack of a satisfying resolution to the mystery built up surrounding Ruby's parentage. In another piece by Griffin, she felt as though Ruby's relationship with the Doctor was not deeply elaborated upon, and that the Doctor's absence in "Lucky Day" only further showed the lack of depth in their relationship.
