= Millie Gibson =

English actress (born 2004)

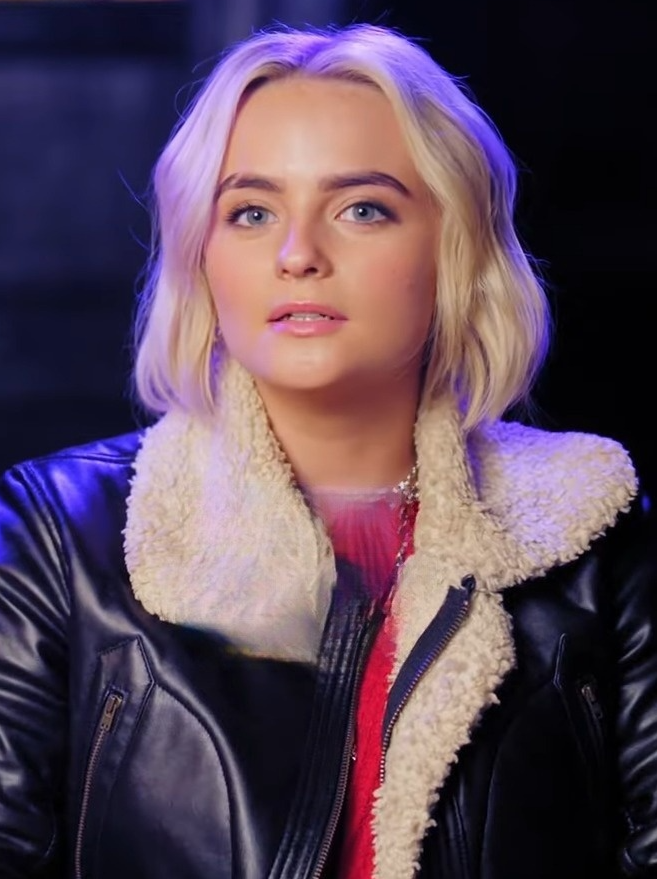
- Gibson in 2023 during promo for Doctor Who
- Born: Amelia Eve Gibson; 19 June 2004 (age 22); Tameside, Greater Manchester, England
- Occupation: Actress
- Years active: 2015–present
- Known for: Coronation Street; Doctor Who

Amelia Eve Gibson (born 19 June 2004), known professionally as Millie Gibson, is an English actress. She is known for portraying Kelly Neelan in the ITV soap opera Coronation Street from 2019 to 2022. She gained international recognition through her roles as Ruby Sunday in the BBC science-fiction series Doctor Who and Irene Heron in the 5 drama The Forsytes.

== Early life ==
Gibson was born on 19 June 2004 in Greater Manchester. She is the younger of two children with an older brother called Morgan. She has a scar on her right eyebrow from falling downstairs as a baby. She is from the Tameside village of Broadbottom, and attended the Blue Coat School in Oldham. She took drama classes at Oldham Theatre Workshop, where she was spotted by Manchester Media City talent agency Scream Management, which began representing her for her childhood roles. She is now represented by 42 Management and Production for her adult career.

== Career ==
=== 2017–2022: Early Career and Coronation Street ===
Gibson made her acting debut as Indira Cave in the CBBC television series Jamie Johnson in 2017. She went on to appear in the second and third series, appearing in a total of 17 episodes. In November 2017, she appeared as Mia in the third episode of the BBC One drama series Love, Lies and Records. In October 2018, she appeared in the three-part ITV drama series Butterfly as Lily Duffy.

In June 2019, Gibson joined the cast of the ITV soap opera Coronation Street as Kelly Neelan. She originally appeared in five episodes before returning as a regular character in April 2020 for more than 200 episodes. For her portrayal of Kelly, she won the award for Best Young Performer at the 2022 British Soap Awards. She was also nominated for Best Actress at the Inside Soap Awards later that year. In August 2022, it was announced Gibson had decided to leave the soap and that she would depart later in the year. She made her final on-screen appearance as Kelly on 23 September 2022.

=== 2023–present: Doctor Who and The Forsytes ===
In November 2022, it was announced during the BBC's annual Children in Need telethon that Gibson would join the cast of Doctor Who in 2023 as Ruby Sunday, companion to the Fifteenth Doctor, portrayed by Ncuti Gatwa. She made her debut in the 2023 Christmas special, "The Church on Ruby Road", and continued in the role for thirteen episodes, including select appearances in the fifteenth series of the revival in 2025, alongside Gatwa, with Varada Sethu joining the cast as new companion, Belinda.

In April 2024, it was announced that a third adaptation of The Forsyte Saga by John Galsworthy had been commissioned by Channel 5 and Masterpiece PBS. Gibson was cast as the female lead, Irene, opposite Australian actor Joshua Orpin as Soames. The first series was broadcast in the UK in October and November 2025. The second series premiered in some European countries in September 2026 before being released in the UK in October. The show was renewed for a third series in March 2026 and this was filmed in the summer with Gibson returning amongst the main cast.

== Personal Life ==
Gibson has been in a relationship with music label owner Tom Neatis since 2022.

== Filmography ==
=== Television ===
Year	Title	Role	Production	Notes	Ref.
2017–2018	Jamie Johnson	Indira Cave	CBBC	Main role; 17 episodes	
2017	Love, Lies and Records	Mia	BBC One	Episode #1.3	
2018	Butterfly	Lily Duffy	ITV	Main role; 3 episodes	
2019–2022	Coronation Street	Kelly Neelan	ITV	Series regular; 215 episodes	
2023–2025	Doctor Who	Ruby Sunday	BBC One/BBC iPlayer	Main role; 13 episodes	
2024	Tales of the TARDIS	Ruby Sunday	BBC One/BBC iPlayer	Episode: "Pyramids of Mars"	
2025–present	The Forsytes	Irene Forsyte (née Heron)	5/Masterpiece PBS	Lead role; 12 episodes	

=== Stage ===
Year	Title	Role	Venue	Ref.
2015	Eyam	Joy Foster	Oldham Coliseum Theatre	
2015	Comfort and Joy	Grace	Oldham Theatre Workshop	
2019	Prom! The Musical	Lisette	Oldham Coliseum Theatre	

=== Audio ===
Year	Title	Role	Production	Notes	Ref.
2018	Me Myself I	Esme	BBC Radio 4	1 episode	
2019	Stone	Alice Stone	BBC Radio 4	Series regular (series 8), 5 episodes	
2024	Ruby Red	Narrator	BBC Sounds	Doctor Who audiobook	

== Bibliography ==
Forewords

- Gibson, Millie (2024). Foreword. Doctor Who: The Official Annual 2025. By Paul Lang, Millie. BBC Books. ISBN 978-1405965286.

== Awards and nominations ==
Year	Award	Category	Work	Result	Ref.
2022	British Soap Awards	Best Young Performer	Coronation Street	Won	
2022	National Television Awards	Serial Drama Performance	Coronation Street	Longlisted	
2022	Inside Soap Awards	Best Actress	Coronation Street	Nominated	
2022	I Talk Telly Awards	Best Soap Performance	Coronation Street	Nominated	
2024	TV Times Awards	Favourite Supporting Actor (Drama)	Doctor Who	Nominated	
