= The Web of Fear =

1968 British Doctor Who sci-fi TV serial

041 – The Web of Fear
- Doctor Who serial
- A pair of Yeti in the deserted London Underground as seen in the serial. The Yeti's presence in a familiar environment was discussed by critics to be an important reason for the serial's memorability.

Cast
- Doctor: Patrick Troughton – Second Doctor
- Companions: Frazer Hines – Jamie McCrimmon; Deborah Watling – Victoria Waterfield
- Others: Nicholas Courtney – Colonel Lethbridge-Stewart; Jack Watling – Professor Travers; Tina Packer – Anne Travers; Jon Rollason – Harold Chorley; Ralph Watson – Captain Knight; Jack Woolgar – Staff Sergeant Arnold (Note: Jack Woolgar also supplied the voice of the Great Intelligence, uncredited.); Richardson Morgan – Corporal Blake; Rod Beacham – Corporal Lane; Stephen Whittaker – Craftsman Weams; Derek Pollitt – Driver Evans; Bernard G. High, Joseph O'Connell – Soldiers; Frederick Schrecker – Julius Silverstein; John Levene, John Lord, Gordon Stothard, Colin Warman, Jeremy King, Roger Jacombs – Yeti

Production
- Directed by: Douglas Camfield
- Written by: Mervyn Haisman and Henry Lincoln
- Script editor: Derrick Sherwin
- Produced by: Peter Bryant
- Music by: None (Note: Stock music used in this serial was composed by Béla Bartók, François Bayle, Wilfred Josephs, with stings composed by Brian Hodgson.)
- Production code: QQ
- Series: Season 5
- Running time: 6 episodes, 25 minutes each
- Episode(s) missing: 1 episode (3)
- First broadcast: 3 February 1968
- Last broadcast: 9 March 1968

Chronology
← Preceded by The Enemy of the World	Followed by → Fury from the Deep

The Web of Fear is the fifth serial of the fifth season of the British science fiction television series Doctor Who, first broadcast in six weekly parts from 3 February to 9 March 1968. Written by writers Henry Lincoln and Mervyn Haisman, the serial is a sequel to 1967 serial The Abominable Snowmen. The plot concerns the incorporeal Great Intelligence and its robotic Yeti minions invading the London Underground in order to lead the time travelling Second Doctor (Patrick Troughton) into a trap where it can drain the Doctor's mind of its knowledge. The Web of Fear marks the first appearance of Nicholas Courtney as Colonel Alistair Lethbridge-Stewart, who would serve as a major recurring character in the series going forward.

The serial was commissioned as a result of then story editor Peter Bryant being highly pleased with The Abominable Snowmen, additionally wanting to feature the Yeti more due to a desire to include more "monsters" in the series. Haisman and Lincoln decided to set the story in the London Underground, wanting the serial's events to be close to home for viewers. The Yeti were redesigned after their appearance in the prior serial, giving the creatures a "rougher" appearance. Due to difficulties in scheduling the Underground for filming, the Underground was reconstructed as a set at BBC studios, where most of the serial's filming took place.

The serial has been regarded as an iconic serial in the series and has received largely positive reviews from retrospective critics. Following the serial's airing, the serial's episodes were destroyed, rendering the serial as missing. One episode was recovered in 1978, with four other episodes being recovered in Nigeria in 2013. The serial's third episode has not been recovered but was reconstructed via animation for a 2021 physical release of the serial.

== Plot ==
The TARDIS lands in a deserted London Underground, with London appearing to be completely abandoned. The elderly Professor Travers (Jack Watling) had previously met the Second Doctor (Patrick Troughton) and his companions forty years earlier in Tibet, where the group had fought off the villainous Great Intelligence; Travers had brought back a robotic Yeti with him, which he recently had accidentally re-activated. The Yeti escaped, and in the following days, London was beset by a deadly web-like fungus. Travers and his daughter Anne (Tina Packer) are working with the British military to try and resolve the situation.

The Doctor and his companions encounter the military, who are trying to stem the spread of the fungus by demolishing tunnels with explosives. The explosives are rendered unable to detonate by a number of Yeti, which allows the Doctor to deduce that the Great Intelligence has returned. Travers is able to convince the military that the Doctor will be able to help them stop the Intelligence. Soon after, the group is joined by Lieutenant-Colonel Lethbridge-Stewart (Nicholas Courtney), who takes command.

The fungus begins to expand into the military's explosives stores, rendering them unusable. The Doctor discovers a Yeti-attracting beacon at the scene, indicating to him that someone in the base is working with the Intelligence. The base is attacked by Yeti, killing several soldiers and kidnapping Travers. The Doctor tells the military of the TARDIS, and a group is sent to retrieve it to allow for later escape, though all the soldiers barring Lethbridge-Stewart are killed.

Soon after, Travers, possessed by the Intelligence, arrives at the military's base. The Intelligence explains that it seeks to drain the Doctor's mind of knowledge. The Doctor appears to submit to the Intelligence, but not before reprogramming a Yeti to aid his allies. Later, the traitor is revealed to be one of the soldiers named Arnold (Jack Woolgar), who has been killed and possessed by the Intelligence. As the Doctor enters a device to have his mind drained, the reprogrammed Yeti attacks Arnold while the others drag the Doctor out of the device and destroy it, which causes the Intelligence to disperse. The Doctor reveals he had intended to use the device to drain the Intelligence, and hence the others' interference has allowed it to escape back into space. The Doctor and his companions depart in the TARDIS.

== Production ==
=== Writing and design ===
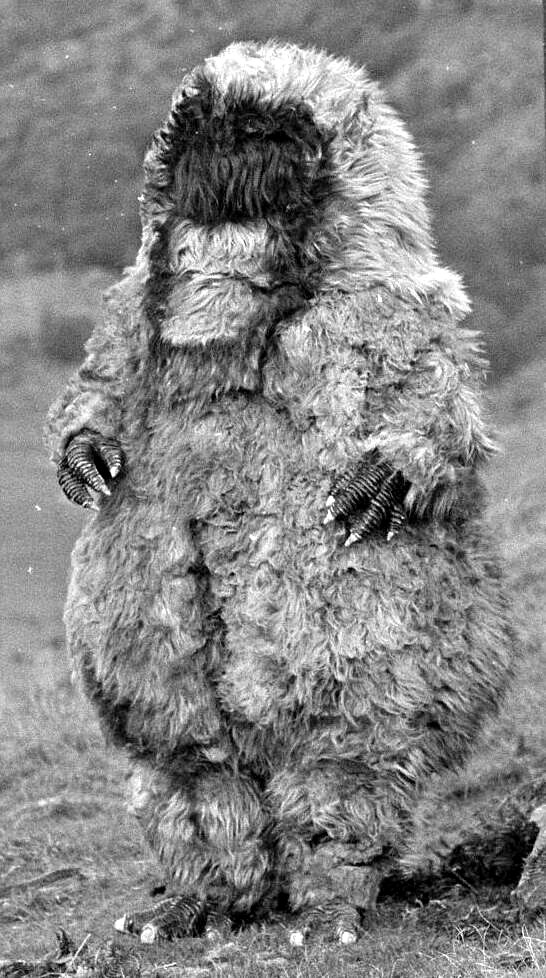
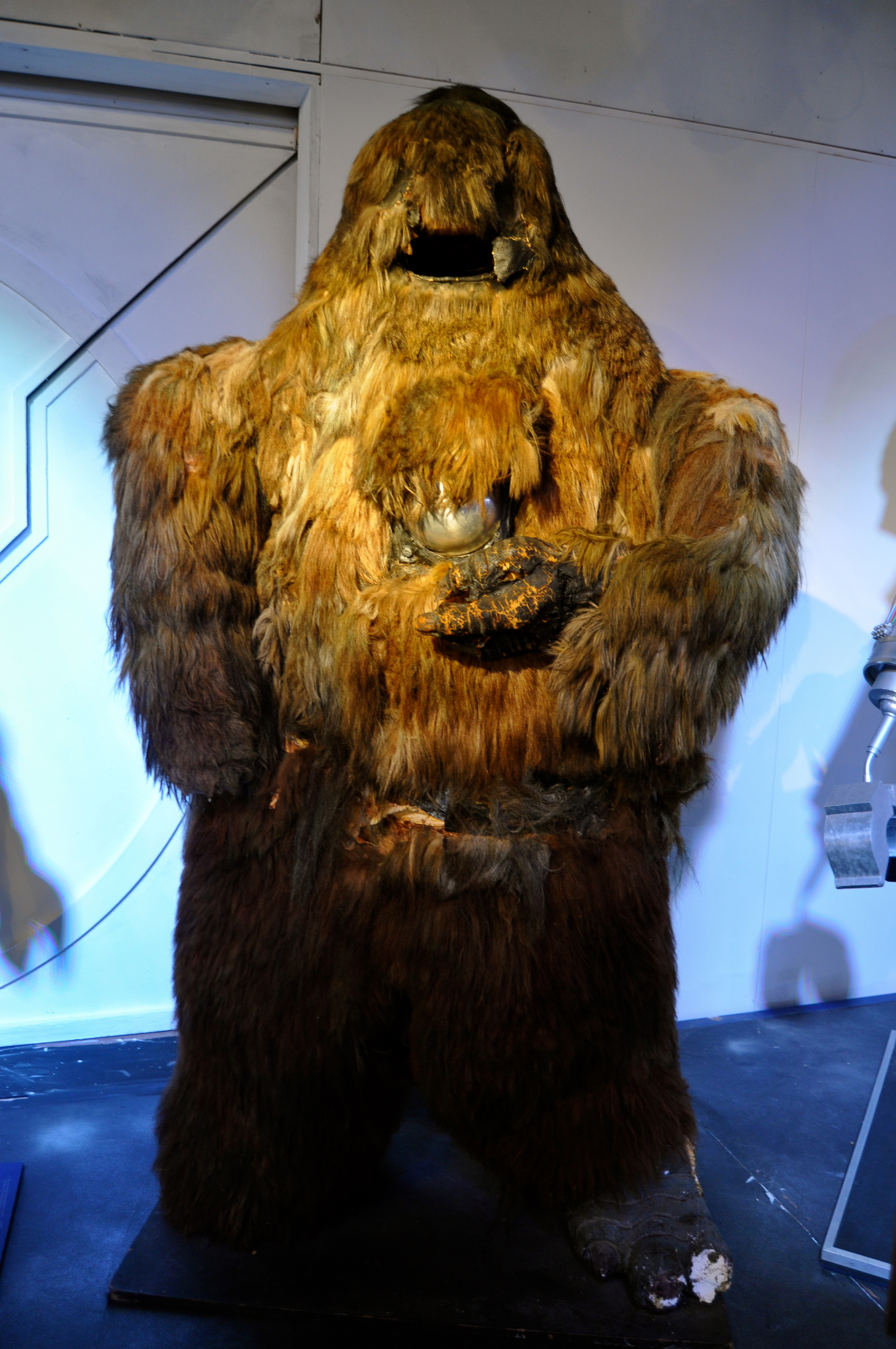
A Yeti as seen in a photo taken during filming of The Abominable Snowmen (1967) (left) and a Yeti costume from The Web of Fear (1968) as seen on display at the Doctor Who Experience. The Yeti were re-designed for the serial for multiple reasons.

Story editor Peter Bryant was so greatly pleased by Mervyn Haisman and Henry Lincoln's previous serial, The Abominable Snowmen, that Bryant commissioned a sequel for the serial to be produced before The Abominable Snowmen had even aired. Bryant sought to include more "monsters" in the series as he believed they were popular with viewers. The Great Intelligence and its Yeti minions were brought back, with Haisman and Lincoln deciding to set the serial in the London Underground in order to provide a familiar backdrop that would "bring the Doctor's adventures far closer to home". Haisman and Lincoln stated that the Underground also served as a logical location for potential invaders of London to try and control. Bryant soon took over as producer for the series, resulting in Derrick Sherwin taking over as script editor. Sherwin found himself having disagreements with Haisman and Lincoln, who were very protective over their scripts.

For their re-appearance in The Web of Fear, the original Yeti costumes had already started to deteriorate, and many had criticised the "cuddly" Yeti designs. As a result, the next design was made to be "rougher" and had glowing eyes. They used yak hair for their construction, were slightly smaller sized than the originals, and wielded "web guns" to attack, unlike before where they solely used their physical strength. They were constructed by freelance prop builders Jack and John Lowell. An original Yeti costume from The Abominable Snowmen was used briefly in the serial as a display piece in a museum, and the old design was transitioned to the new design during the serial's events. Brian Hodgson of the BBC Radiophonic Workshop developed a Yeti roar for the Yetis' second appearance, created by slowing down the sound of a flushing toilet.

The episode's credits are played over a glowing, pulsating web, unlike the usual black screen used for the credits. Stock incidental music is used during the serial as a cost-saving measure, including a theme that was previously used in serials depicting the Cybermen.

=== Casting and characters ===
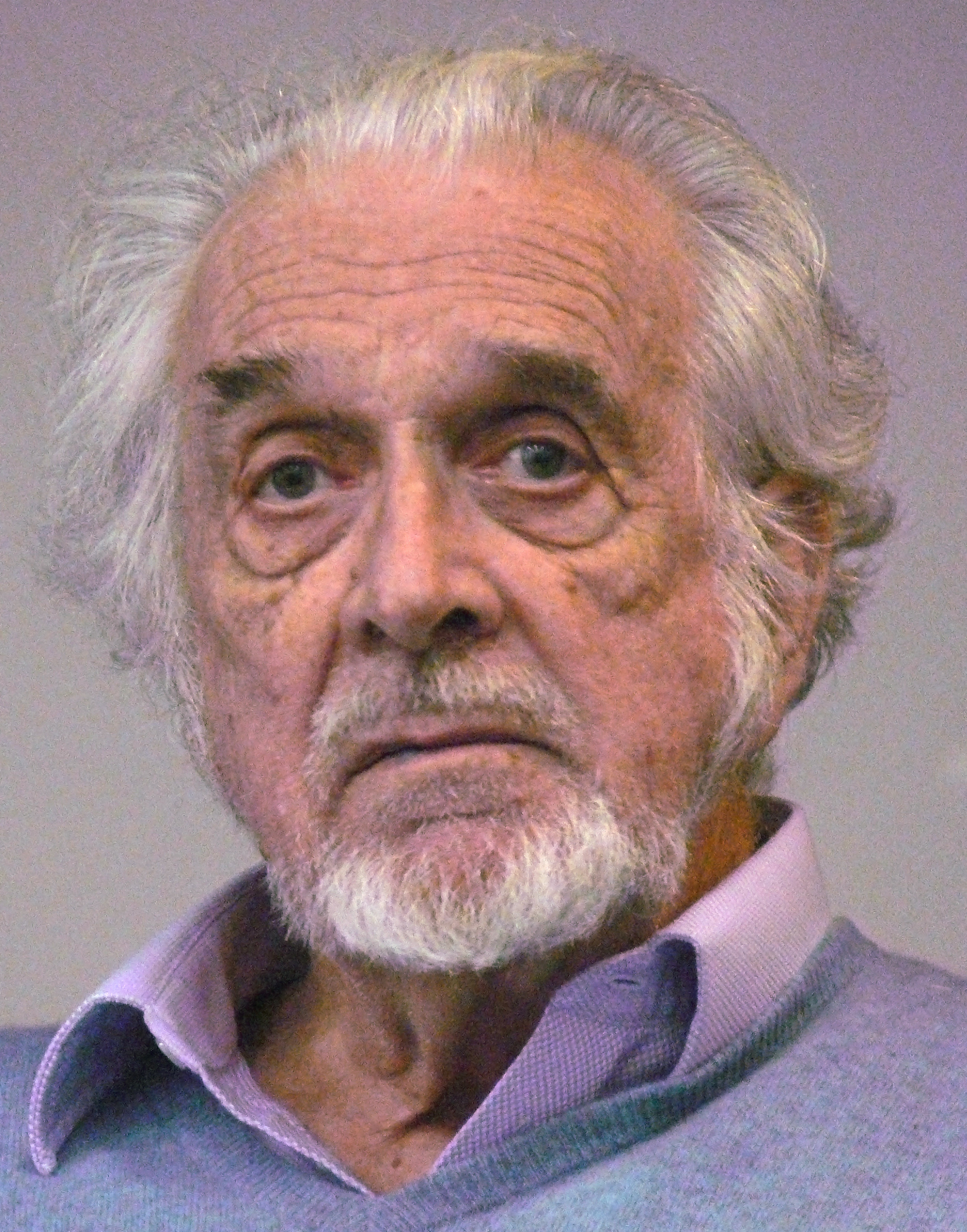
The Web of Fear marks the first appearance of Nicholas Courtney (pictured in 2010) as Brigadier Lethbridge-Stewart, who later became a recurring character in the series.

Jack Watling reprises his role of Professor Travers from the previous year's The Abominable Snowmen, wearing heavy makeup to make it appear as though Travers has aged significantly. John Levene, who portrays a Yeti in this serial, had previously portrayed a Cyberman in 1967's The Moonbase, and would later return to the series as the recurring character Sergeant Benton in the 1970s. Tina Packer portrays Anne Travers in the serial, while Jack Woolgar portrays Arnold. Woolgar also portrays the Intelligence's voice, albeit in an uncredited role.

Nicholas Courtney portrays Lethbridge-Stewart in the serial. He previously portrayed the role of Bret Vyon in the 1965 serial The Daleks' Master Plan. Courtney would later reprise the role of Lethbridge-Stewart in 1968's The Invasion and would go on to be a recurring character in the series. David Langton was originally cast as Lethbridge-Stewart, but he pulled out before rehearsals and Courtney (originally cast as the character Captain Knight) was given the part instead. Nicholas Selby was also considered for the role, but he was not interested in it. Maurice Brooks briefly portrays the character via boots seen in the serial's second part prior to Courtney's first on-screen appearance.

=== Filming ===
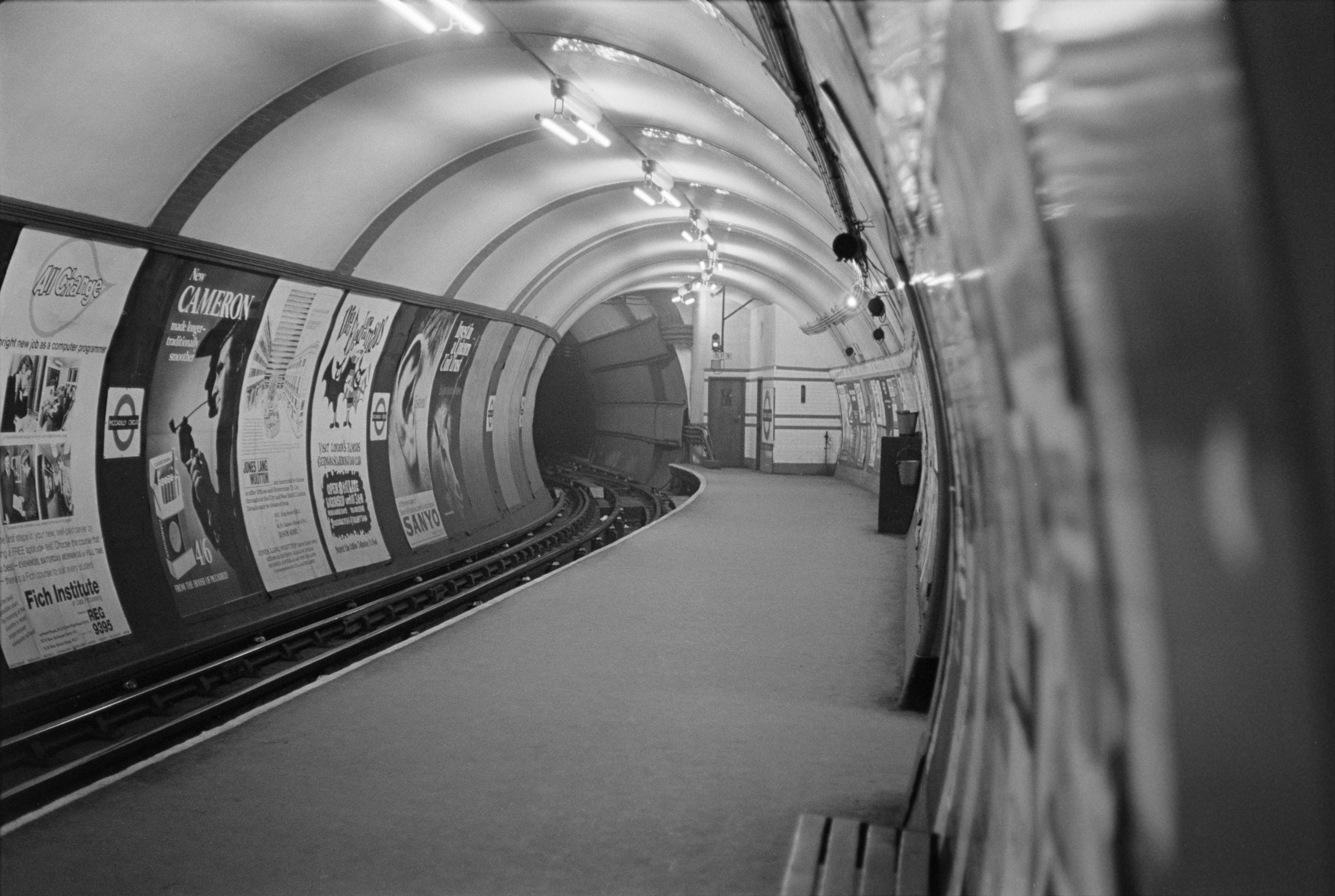
A London Underground tunnel as pictured in 1969

The production team originally planned to film in the London Underground; according to the BBC's The Fourth Dimension guide, the production team was denied permission, while according to the BBC and The Complete History, the production team would have been forced to pay £200 an hour, with a stipulation to film only between 2 and 5 AM. Designer David Myerscough-Jones thus re-created the tunnels at the BBC studios in such detail that the London Underground reportedly contacted the BBC to accuse them of illegally filming there. The same platform set is re-used for the multiple different platforms featured in the serial, with the signage changed to indicate that the characters were at different platforms. Visual effects for the serial were handled by Ron Oates.

Filming for the serial began in December 1967, with much of it being filmed in BBC's Television Film Studios in Ealing. Some location filming was performed for scenes depicting the Yeti fighting the military at an old yard in Covent Garden, with further Yeti shots performed on nearby streets. Filming was done early in the morning on a Sunday, allowing for little crowd control to be needed for filming to commence. The scene in which the Yeti is re-activated by Travers was filmed at the Natural History Museum, London. Oates's team completed filming using scale models at the Television Centre, London. Patrick Troughton took a week's holiday during the rehearsals and recording of Episode 2. Filming finished in January 1968, with further studio recording concluding the following month.

The serial was directed by Douglas Camfield. Camfield found directing easier than his prior serials, which had been with previous lead actor William Hartnell; Camfield found the current lead, Patrick Troughton, easier to work with. The team ran into problems with the Yeti as several action sequences could not be performed, such as a scene where a Yeti lifts and throws a soldier, due to how heavy the costumes were. Camfield grew to dislike the Yeti as he found them limiting in stories.

== Reception ==
=== Broadcast and ratings ===
Episode	Title	Run time	Original release date	UK viewers (millions)	Appreciation Index
1	"Episode 1"	24:53	3 February 1968	7.2	54
2	"Episode 2"	24:38	10 February 1968	6.8	53
3	"Episode 3"^{†}	24:34	17 February 1968	7.0	51
4	"Episode 4"	24:50	24 February 1968	8.4	53
5	"Episode 5"	24:19	2 March 1968	8.0	55
6	"Episode 6"	24:41	9 March 1968	8.3	55

^† Episode is missing

As a result of the Yeti's popularity and the new design, prior to the airing of The Web of Fear, a special trailer featuring Patrick Troughton in character as the Second Doctor was shown, telling audiences to expect far scarier Yeti in the serial. The trailer was broadcast shortly after the final episode of the prior serial, The Enemy of the World (1967) aired. The Web of Fear was broadcast from 3 February 1968 to 9 March 1968. The serial saw an increase in viewing figures from the prior serial, with The Web of Fear's sixth episode resulting in the series featuring in the top forty programs for the first time since September 1967. The serial also garnered a healthy audience appreciation rating, ranging from 51 to 55 across the six episodes.

The videotapes for The Web of Fear were ordered to be destroyed in mid-1969, and they were wiped later that year. A 16 mm telerecording of the first episode was recovered by chance in 1978, when BBC Archive selector Sue Malden found it in a pile of film cans returned from Hong Kong that were waiting to be destroyed. The episode was screened at various events over the years. Copies of the remaining five episodes were found at a relay station in Jos, Nigeria by Philip Morris of Television International Enterprises Archive, and all but one were returned to the BBC archives in 2013; the third episode was lost "en route" during the film cans' retrieval, with Morris presuming it was sold to a private collector. Morris stated in 2018 that he was "close" to recovering the episode, though in 2020 and 2025, he said he was not certain of its whereabouts and was hoping to have it returned.

=== Critical response and analysis ===
In the years following The Web of Fear's release, the serial has been considered highly iconic, with PopMatters writer J.C. Macek III describing it as a "classic", while The Daily Telegraph's Matthew Sweet described the serial as a "restored fragment of our cultural heritage". Literary critic John Kenneth Muir considered the story to be highly important to the show as a whole, as it established Lethbridge-Stewart, who would go on to be a major character in the series, as well as a style of alien invasion stories that would be repeated with great success throughout the show's run. Writing in The Television Companion, David J Howe and Stephen Walker praised the serial, particularly positively highlighting Camfield's direction, Myerscough-Jones's set design and the usage of the Yeti as antagonists, with their presence in a familiar environment allowing the Yeti to have increased menace as antagonists. Patrick Mulkern from Radio Times praised Camfield's direction, the execution of the paranoia caused by the presence of a traitor, and the well-developed side characters, with Mulkern praising the serial as one of the show's best.

Macek highlighted the serial's dark lighting, which allowed for the Yeti to act as effective antagonists, though felt the Yeti were not as effective in the scenes shot in above ground in daylight. Christopher Bahn, writing for The A.V. Club, praised the serial's tension building, usage of the Yeti, and the character of Lethbridge-Stewart, but he felt the serial's ending was weak and let down by the lack of a sequel story. Graeme Burk and Stacey Smith?, writing in the book The Doctors Are In: The Essential and Unofficial Guide to Doctor Who's Greatest Time Lord, both considered the serial to be strong, with several highly effective moments. Smith?, however, believed the serial was unable to be experienced the same as when it was first aired due to viewers now knowing that Lethbridge-Stewart could not be a culprit due to his recurring role, while Burk felt that many of the culprits were negative stereotypes of various groups, such as the Jewish and Welsh, and that the fights with the Yeti in the daylight were not done well.

Simon Morgan-Russell, writing in the Journal of Popular Film & Television, opined that the serial served as a representation of anxieties present in the British public at the time of its airing. Morgan-Russell wrote that the serial's Underground setting evoked a feeling of familiarity in audiences, and the presence of the Intelligence and the Yeti in such a space served to represent how evils and uncertainties of the time, such as Cold War anxieties and home soil reforms, could invade the familiar and commonplace elements of British life.

== Commercial releases ==
Doctor Who and the Web of Fear
- Author: Terrance Dicks
- Cover artist: Chris Achilleos
- Series: Doctor Who book: Target novelisations
- Release number: 72
- Publisher: Target Books
- Publication date: 19 August 1976
- ISBN: 0-426-11084-6

A novelisation of this serial, written by Terrance Dicks, was published by Target Books in August 1976, entitled Doctor Who and The Web of Fear. Episode 1 of The Web of Fear, then the only surviving episode of the serial, was released on DVD in 2004 as part of the Lost in Time box set. The serial's surviving audio was later released on CD and as an MP3 download by the BBC, with linking narration provided by Frazer Hines.

On 11 October 2013, the recovered episodes were released on iTunes, with episode 3 represented with a tele-snap photo reconstruction accompanied by the surviving off-air soundtrack. The iTunes release would become one of the top ten most downloaded releases of that week. The serial was released on VOD in 2013 and on DVD in 2014, which sold 15,000 units the first week in the UK, a record for the Doctor Who classic series line at the time. A special edition, featuring an animated third episode, was released on DVD and Blu-ray on 16 August 2021. A German-language DVD and Blu-ray edition was released by Polyband on 25 March 2022, featuring optional German narration of the third episode's telesnap reconstruction by Dominik Seiler.

== Bibliography ==
- Ainsworth, John (1 June 2016). Doctor Who: The Complete History: The Abominable Snowmen – The Ice Warriors – The Enemy of the World – The Web of Fear. Hachette Partworks, Panini Publishing. ISSN 2057-6048.
