= Fury from the Deep =

042 – Fury from the Deep
- Doctor Who serial
- Mr. Quill emits soporific gas from his mouth; one of the few scenes that survive from this serial.

Cast
- Doctor: Patrick Troughton – Second Doctor
- Companions: Frazer Hines – Jamie McCrimmon; Deborah Watling – Victoria Waterfield
- Others: Victor Maddern – Robson; Roy Spencer – Frank Harris; June Murphy – Maggie Harris; John Abineri – Van Lutyens; John Garvin – Carney; Hubert Rees – Chief Engineer; Graham Leaman – Price; Richard Mayes – Chief Baxter; Margaret John – Megan Jones; Brian Cullingford – Perkins; Bill Burridge – Mr Quill; John Gill – Mr Oak; Peter Ducrow – Guard

Production
- Directed by: Hugh David
- Written by: Victor Pemberton
- Script editor: Derrick Sherwin
- Produced by: Peter Bryant
- Executive producer: None
- Music by: Dudley Simpson
- Production code: RR
- Series: Season 5
- Running time: 6 episodes, 25 minutes each
- Episode(s) missing: All episodes
- First broadcast: 16 March 1968
- Last broadcast: 20 April 1968

Chronology
← Preceded by The Web of Fear	Followed by → The Wheel in Space

Fury from the Deep is the completely missing sixth serial of the fifth season in the British science fiction television series Doctor Who, which originally aired in six weekly parts from 16 March to 20 April 1968. Loosely based on the 1965 radio serial The Slide by writer Victor Pemberton, this story marks Deborah Watling's last regular appearance as Victoria Waterfield and the first appearance of the sonic screwdriver.

In this serial, the Doctor (Patrick Troughton) and his travelling companions Jamie McCrimmon (Frazer Hines) and Victoria Waterfield (Watling) arrive at a Euro Sea Gas refinery off the coast of contemporary England, where an infectious weed spreads rapidly, infecting and controlling the minds of anyone who comes into contact with it, including the refinery leader Robson (Victor Maddern).

Although it received mixed reviews from contemporary critics, Fury from the Deep has been positively re-evaluated as one of the scariest stories in Doctor Who's history. Every episode of the serial was destroyed by the BBC in 1974 due to archival policy, though small clips and the complete audio soundtrack exists. It was the last serial to have its videotapes wiped. In September 2020, BBC Studios released an animated reconstruction using the original audio, animated by Big Finish Creative.

== Plot ==
The Second Doctor, Jamie and Victoria land on the eastern coast of England, where they discover a heartbeat emitting from a gas pipe. The three are captured by Robson, a ruthless gas refiner who heads a pumping operation with a network of rigs spanning the North Sea. Robson is unnerved by the loss of contact with one of his rigs; the Doctor proposes there is a creature in the pipes and they should be allowed to investigate, but Robson has his second in command, Harris, lock them up.

Harris disagrees with Robson and asks his wife, Mrs. Harris, to find some files for him. This leads to her being pricked by seaweed and falling ill. Harris requests the Doctor's help, but in the interim, Mr. Oak and Mr. Quill, two technicians who have been infected by the seaweed, arrive and knock her unconscious. The Doctor experiments on the seaweed, which when returned to water grows in size and strength, and seems to become malevolent before they successfully seal it in its aquarium. Robson is soon after attacked by the weed, though is able to escape with the Doctor and Harris's intervention. Harris assumes control of the command centre of oil operations, as the Doctor discovers that Harris's home has begun to fill with sea foam, which he narrowly escapes.

Robson kidnaps Victoria and flees as the weed creatures begin to infiltrate and attack the central control of the oil platforms. The Doctor and Jamie follow after Robson and Victoria, and discover Robson has been mostly transformed into a seaweed creature. Jamie finds Victoria elsewhere, and Victoria screams in response to seeing Robson, which seems to disable him briefly. As the group escapes, the Doctor realises the creatures are sensitive to high-pitched sounds, and he uses the centre's equipment to amplify Victoria's screams into the pipes. The creatures are destroyed, and the infected humans, including Robson and Mrs. Harris, are returned to normal.

Victoria, mentally and emotionally exhausted, and frustrated that everywhere they go together is always dangerous and she's always afraid, decides to stop travelling with the Doctor and Jamie. The Harrises welcome her into their home. The Doctor and Jamie stay another day to check that she is sure about her decision, and after saying their goodbyes to Victoria, depart in the TARDIS.

== Production ==
=== Writing ===
Screenwriter Victor Pemberton developed a science-fiction script titled The Slide, which was based on his fear of earthquakes and involved a mysterious substance emerging from a fissure. In 1964, he pitched the script as a television story for Doctor Who's second season. It was rejected by story editor David Whitaker on 24 September. He called the script a "stewpot" and stated "I don't think the dialogue is very good and I am quite sure it is not right for Doctor Who". Pemberton submitted an alternate stand-alone version of the script to BBC Radio on 17 August 1964. The following year, producer Peter Bryant commissioned The Slide as a seven-part radio serial. The radio production of The Slide, broadcast from 13 February to 27 March 1966, involved parasitic mud taking control of an English town.

By summer 1967, Bryant was Doctor Who's story editor. Pemberton, who had recently completed a three-month stint in the same role, (Note: At the time Pemberton was also working as an actor. He played Jules in The Moonbase (1967).) suggested to Bryant that The Slide could be adapted into a new Doctor Who serial. Bryant agreed and on 5 October 1967 he commissioned Pemberton to write a six-part serial titled Doctor Who and the Colony of Devils.

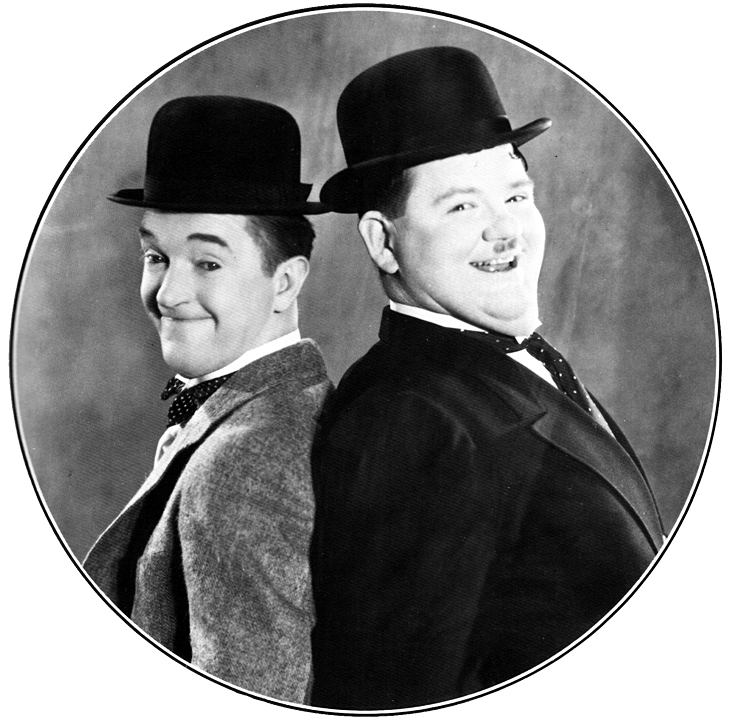
The infected engineers were intended to resemble Laurel and Hardy, whom writer Victor Pemberton had met.

Pemberton changed the story's villain from parasitic mud to natural gas, which was then being developed as a new fuel for Britain. His inspiration was a gas leak which had occurred on the North Sea surface. The terrifying premise resonated with British audiences as natural gas was beginning to be used widely in British homes. The creature also takes the form of seaweed, which Pemberton disliked for its slimy texture. The seaweed's ominous heartbeat was inspired by Edgar Allan Poe's 1843 short story The Tell-Tale Heart. The production team suggested the seaweed could be covered by a mass of foam, allowing for further exploitation of the foam machine recently used in The Abominable Snowmen (1967). Pemberton changed the story's setting to a gas refinery rather than a town, making the cast of townspeople workers at the refinery. The fat-and-thin infected engineers Oak and Quill (Note: Quill was originally named Swan, but this was changed because a character named Swann had appeared earlier the same season in The Enemy of the World (1967–1968).) were intended to resemble an evil version of the comedy double act Laurel and Hardy, whom Pemberton had met in 1953. He later considered reusing the characters in a spin-off project. Pemberton knew Troughton well and scripted the Doctor with the actor's mannerisms in mind. Originally this serial came before The Web of Fear (1968), but their order was swapped to capitalise on the popularity of the returning Yeti villains from The Abominable Snowmen.

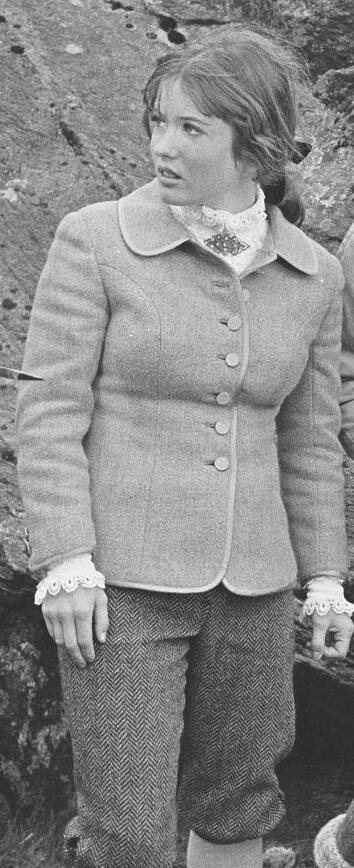
Fury from the Deep marked the last regular appearance of Deborah Watling as companion Victoria Waterfield (pictured here during filming for The Abominable Snowmen).

When Pemberton delivered the scripts for Colony of Devils, Bryant was the series' producer and Derrick Sherwin had replaced him as story editor. Sherwin and the serial's director Hugh David disliked the scripts. Pemberton, who was accustomed to writing for radio, relied too heavily on dialogue in his scripts. Sherwin rewrote the episodes over Christmas 1967. The climax was changed to focus on Victoria's screams. Actress Deborah Watling had gained the nickname "Leatherlungs" for her constant shrieking on the series, though in this serial Victoria's screams were performed by assistant floor manager Margot Hayhoe. The screaming was augmented with radiophonic effects created for The Underwater Menace (1967). The script was also amended to reduce the need for exterior filming. Around the end of 1967, Watling informed the production team she would be leaving the series, since she would be completing her contracted work by the end of The Colony of Devils. The storyline was rewritten to pre-empt Victoria's departure. (Note: Although Watling gave the production team three months' notice, Victoria had already been written into five upcoming serials.) Casting for a replacement female companion (later named Zoe Heriot) began in early January 1968.

Pemberton was unhappy with Sherwin's script changes—particularly the softening of Oak and Quill's sinister behaviour—and threatened to remove his name from the production. He eventually allowed himself to be credited.

=== Filming ===
Dudley Simpson's incidental music was composed prior to filming. He reused a theme from The Evil of the Daleks (1967), Victoria's introductory serial, for scenes focused on her. The design of the seaweed was intentionally not based on the human form, to differentiate it from other Doctor Who monsters.

Filming began at the cliffs near Botany Bay, Kent on 4 February 1968. As with location filming on The Abominable Snowmen, this serial used 16 mm film rather than previously used 35 mm film. This was being done to keep budgets down in preparation for the move to colour television. The opening scene of the TARDIS landing on the sea was achieved with a quarter-sized model (originally made for 1965's The Romans) suspended from a helicopter via piano wire. Both Frazer Hines and Watling have remarked on how harsh the winter cold was during the exterior shoot along the British coast. Watling complained that her short-skirted costume gave no remit from the cold, and she recalled noticing herself surreptitiously adjusting her skirt during a broadcast scene.

Pemberton's script indicated that in Episode 1, the Doctor "took from his pocket something which looks like his own version of a screwdriver" to undo screws from a pipeline box. Bryant was underwhelmed by the normal screwdriver prop prepared for filming, and instead suggested that the Doctor could use a special tool (later named the sonic screwdriver). A new prop was created by Peter Day, but Patrick Troughton kept dropping the prop due to the cold, so ultimately the whistle from Watling's lifejacket was used instead. To complete the effect, the visual effects team provided a prop box in which the screws could be undone from the inside. The sonic screwdriver subsequently became an iconic tool associated with the Doctor in the series.

The Natural Gas Development Board gave the crew permission (under certain restrictions) for the crew to shoot on a gas platform; Red Sands Fort in the Thames estuary was chosen. Due to the technical limits of the foam machine, water containers had to be ferried across to the platform. In mid-February the serial was retitled Fury from the Deep for fear of using the word "devils" in a family show.

Studio recording began on 24 February at Lime Grove Studio D. Filming at Ealing Studios took place from 4 to 6 March. During filming, Troughton considered leaving the series at the end of his contract, but following a discussion with his co-stars, he decided to remain in the role for at least another year. The final day of recording took place in Studio 1 at BBC Television Centre on 29 March.

Fury from the Deep featured Watling's last regular appearance as Victoria. Footage of her final scene was reused in Episode 1 of the following serial The Wheel in Space; she received an on-screen credit. Watling agreed to return for a cameo appearance in the 20th anniversary episode "The Five Doctors" (1983), but she left during pre-production to appear in a Dave Allen programme instead. She later reprised the role of Victoria in the 30th-anniversary charity special Dimensions in Time (1993) and the direct-to-video film Downtime (1995).

=== Casting ===
Several cast members appeared in other Doctor Who serials. Roy Spencer (Frank Harris) had previously played Manyak in The Ark (1966). Graham Leaman (Price) previously played the Controller in The Macra Terror (1967) and later played a Time Lord in The Three Doctors (1973). Hubert Rees (Chief Engineer) later played Captain Ransom in The War Games (1969) and John Stevenson in The Seeds of Doom (1976). June Murphy (Maggie Harris) later played Third Officer Jane Blythe in The Sea Devils (1972). John Abineri (Van Lutyens) later played General Carrington in The Ambassadors of Death (1970), Richard Railton in Death to the Daleks (1974), and Ranquin in The Power of Kroll (1979). Margaret John (Megan Jones) later played Grandma Connolly in "The Idiot's Lantern" (2006).

== Broadcast ==
Episode	Title	Run time	Original release date	UK viewers (millions)	Appreciation Index
1	"Episode 1"^{†}	24:54	16 March 1968	8.2	55
2	"Episode 2"^{†}	23:08	23 March 1968	7.9	55
3	"Episode 3"^{†}	20:29	30 March 1968	7.7	56
4	"Episode 4"^{†}	24:17	6 April 1968	6.6	56
5	"Episode 5"^{†}	23:40	13 April 1968	5.9	56
6	"Episode 6"^{†}	24:24	20 April 1968	6.9	57

^† Episode is missing

16 mm film prints of Fury from the Deep were sold to overseas broadcasters in Australia, Hong Kong, Singapore and Gibraltar.

=== Archival status ===
Until the establishment of the Film and Videotape Library in 1978, the BBC wiped and reused the videotapes of old programmes deemed to hold no further commercial value. Fury from the Deep's original 625-line videotapes were wiped around late 1974; it was the last Doctor Who serial to have its original tapes wiped. (Note: Coincidentally, the only other Doctor Who serial directed by Hugh David, The Highlanders (1966-7), was the first to have its videotapes wiped.) In 1974 the BBC withdrew the serial from international sale and junked its 16 mm film copies. It is the only season 5 serial for which no episodes are held in the BBC's archives.

The audio of all six episodes survives due to contemporary off-air recordings made by Graham Strong and John de Rivaz. Off-screen tele-snaps taken by John Cura were discovered in 1993. A fifteen-second clip from Episode 1 (the TARDIS landing on the sea) survives as it was reused in Episode 10 of The War Games (1969). In 1996, Australian researchers Damian Shanahan and Ellen Parry discovered film clips in the ABC's archives which had been cut out by censors so that the broadcast would classify for a G rating. These included Oak and Quill's toxic gas attack in Episode 2, encounters with the weed in Episode 4, and shots of Robson in Episode 5.

In 2003, mute 16 mm film trims of unused takes from Episode 6's climax were located in the BBC Film and Television Videotape Library. Design assistant Tony Cornell also used his 8 mm colour film camera to record behind-the-scenes footage of the climactic scene.

== Reception ==
On its transmission, many viewers recalled Fury from the Deep as being particularly accomplished and scary. At the BBC Programme Review Board on 10 April 1968, controllers Huw Wheldon and Paul Fox called the serial a "very good adventure". Monica Sims, the head of children's programmes, noted there were complaints about the characters Oak and Quill. Reviews from television critics were mixed. Writing for The New Statesman, Francis Hope criticised the seaweed monster for being too similar to the fungus from The Web of Fear. He wrote "Dr Who is obviously one of the BBC’s great box office successes, and no amount of peripheral niggling will alter the fact". The Stage and Television Today also criticised "the Crazy Foam threat". This serial was one of Patrick Troughton's favourite Doctor Who stories. In 2013, Deborah Watling named Fury from the Deep as her favourite missing serial, highlighting the heartbeat sound design of the seaweed monster.

In their 1998 book Doctor Who: The Television Companion, David J. Howe and Stephen James Walker stated the story "must be, all in all, one of the most frightening stories ever to be presented by Doctor Who". They singled out the scene of Oak and Quill attacking Maggie Harris as "most terrifying". They also praised the "fine cast", particularly Victor Maddern, and described Victoria's farewell as "poignant [which brings] a distinct lump to the throat". In 2009, critic Mark Braxton gave the serial four stars and agreed that it had some of the scariest scenes in the series. He praised the tense tone and atmosphere, as well as Dudley Simpson's music. He also commended the well written characters, stating that Megan Jones was "one of the show's best guest roles for a woman". Russell T Davies, a future showrunner of the series, recalled watching Fury from the Deep on its original transmission in a June 2003 issue of Doctor Who Magazine. He pondered whether the serial would maintain its atmosphere and reputation if its missing episodes were recovered: "Do we need those tapes? If they turned up, wouldn't we see that bald extra trip over a frond? Wouldn't the foam inspire dull Ibiza jokes? In our heads, this story's become an epic... We make these stories better in our imaginations..."

Researcher Mark Wright notes that the seaweed monster is an early example of using an inanimate everyday object as the villain of a Doctor Who story. This would be used to great effect in Spearhead from Space (1970) and "Blink" (2007), which featured mannequins and statues respectively. It is also noted that Fury from the Deep and the previous serial The Web of Fear mark a transition from the futuristic settings seen in many Second Doctor stories to the contemporary earthbound stories of the Third Doctor's era.

== Commercial releases ==
=== Novelisation ===
Fury from the Deep
- Author: Victor Pemberton
- Cover artist: David McAllister
- Series: Doctor Who book: Target novelisations
- Release number: 110
- Publisher: Target Books
- Publication date: May 1986 (Hardback); 16 October 1986 (Paperback)
- ISBN: 0-491-03652-3

A novelisation of this serial, written by scriptwriter Victor Pemberton, was published by W. H. Allen in hardback in May 1986, and by Target Books in paperback on 16 October 1986. The cover advertised the volume as a special "bumper" edition, as Pemberton delivered a manuscript longer than typical novelisations. It was voted the all-time favourite Doctor Who novel in a July 1989 poll by Doctor Who Magazine. An audiobook of the novelisation, read by David Troughton (Patrick's son), was released by AudioGO in August 2011.

=== Home media ===
Existing visual material was released on VHS as part of the documentary The Missing Years in November 1998. This was re-released on DVD as part of the Lost in Time boxset in November 2004.

In 1993, the audio soundtrack was released on twin cassettes with linking narration written by Eric Saward and performed by Tom Baker in character as the Doctor. In November 2003, a newly remastered CD version was released narrated by Frazer Hines. The soundtrack was released in August 2012 on AudioGO's The Lost TV Episodes: Collection Five.

The track Mr Oak and Mr Quill from Dudley Simpson's score was included on the CD Doctor Who at the BBC Radiophonic Workshop — Volume 1: The Early Years 1963-1969, released in May 2005 from BBC Music. It was also included in Silva Screen Records' CD Doctor Who — The 50th Anniversary Collection in 2013.

At the Animations panel at MCM Comic Con London on 27 October 2019, the BBC announced that Fury from the Deep would be released on DVD and Blu-ray in 2020 with all 6 episodes animated. The animated reconstruction by Big Finish Creative was released on 14 September 2020. Martin Belam of The Guardian gave the animation four stars. He praised the detailed backgrounds and facial animation, though admitted that it made scary scenes feel "slightly comical" and stated that "in places the animation perhaps struggles to convey the unworldly menace of the original". Surviving clips, plus the 1966 radio serial The Slide, were included as bonus features.

=== Theatre ===
From 27 to 30 March 2002, Bedlam Theatre Company presented a BBC-approved adaptation of Fury from the Deep at the New Theatre Royal in Portsmouth. The show's director and playwright Rob Thrush invited Pemberton to advise on the show and approve script changes. Pemberton appeared on local TV to promote the show and share memories of the original production. The production raised funds for the restoration of the theatre.
