= Jack Watling =

English actor (1923–2001)

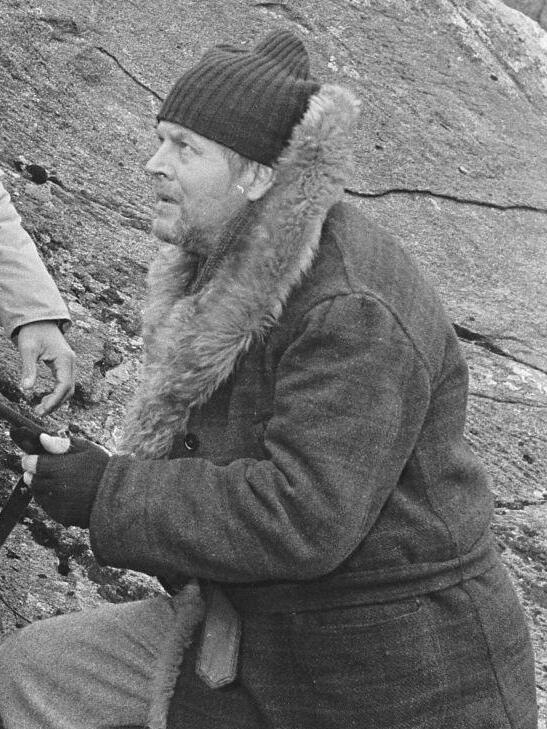
- Watling in 1967
- Born: Jack Stanley Watling; 13 January 1923; Chingford, Essex, England
- Died: 22 May 2001 (aged 78); Chelmsford, Essex, England
- Education: Italia Conti Academy of Theatre Arts
- Occupation: Actor
- Spouse: Patricia Hicks (m. 1947)
- Children: 4, including Deborah and Giles
- Relatives: Dilys Watling (stepdaughter)

Jack Stanley Watling (13 January 1923 – 22 May 2001) was an English actor.

== Life and career ==
Watling was born 13 January 1923 in Chingford, Essex, England. The son of a travelling scrap metal dealer, Watling trained at the Italia Conti Academy of Theatre Arts as a child; and made his stage debut in Where the Rainbow Ends at the Holborn Empire in 1936. He made his first film appearances (all uncredited) in Sixty Glorious Years, Housemaster (both 1938) and Goodbye, Mr Chips (1939).

In 1941, Watling played Bill Hopkins in Once a Crook in his West End debut. He starred as Flight Lieutenant Teddy Graham in the original 1942 production of Terence Rattigan's Flare Path.

Watling had a long career in low-key British films, originally in easy-going boyish roles. His early appearances were in Cottage to Let (1941). We Dive at Dawn (1943), The Demi-Paradise (1943) opposite Laurence Olivier, The Way Ahead (1944) with David Niven, The Winslow Boy (1948), Meet Mr. Lucifer (1953) and in Orson Welles' Mr. Arkadin (aka, Confidential Report, 1955). In the account of the sinking of the Titanic, the film A Night To Remember (1958), he played Fourth Officer Joseph Boxhall and in Sink the Bismarck! (1960) as the Signals officer who reports "HMS Hood...has blown up!"

== Television ==
Watling's reputation as an effective and reliable television actor took root in the early 1960s. He appeared in Danger Man (1960) in the episode "The Traitor" as Rollo Waters. Between 1964 and 1969 he was Don Henderson, the troubled conscience to tough businessman John Wilder (Patrick Wymark) in The Plane Makers and its sequel The Power Game. Watling also appeared as Doc Saxon in the 1970s series Pathfinders. He played Professor Edward Travers in the BBC science-fiction television series Doctor Who in the serials The Abominable Snowmen (1967) and The Web of Fear (1968), both of which also featuring his daughter Deborah Watling as the Second Doctor's companion Victoria Waterfield. He reprised the role decades later in the independent Doctor Who spin-off video Downtime (1995). He also took over the role of Arthur Bourne in the final series of The Cedar Tree in 1979.

Watling's final roles were all on television, in series including Bergerac, four episodes 1989–1991, as Frank Blakemore and Heartbeat as The Colonel 1994 in "Lost and Found".

== Personal life ==
Watling was married to former actress Patricia Hicks. He was the father of actress Deborah Watling, actor/politician Giles Watling, sculptor Nicky Matthews, and a fourth child, Adam, who died in infancy. Watling was also the stepfather of actress Dilys Watling, Hicks's daughter from a previous marriage. The Watlings were long-term residents at Alderton Hall, Loughton.

== Selected filmography ==
=== Films ===
- Sixty Glorious Years (1938) (uncredited)
- The Day Will Dawn (1942) – Lieutenant (uncredited)
- Flying Fortress (1942) – Rear Gunner (uncredited)
- The Young Mr. Pitt (1942) – Atkinson (uncredited)
- We Dive at Dawn (1943) – Navigating Officer – Lt. Gordon, R.N.
- The Demi-Paradise (1943) – Tom
- The Way Ahead (1944) – Buster – Marjorie's boyfriend
- Journey Together (1945) – John Aynesworth
- The Courtneys of Curzon Street (1947) – Teddy Courtney
- Easy Money (1948) – Dennis Stafford
- Quartet (1948) – Nicky (segment "The Facts of Life")
- The Winslow Boy (1948) – Dickie Winslow
- Under Capricorn (1949) – Winter
- Once a Sinner (1950) – John Ross
- The Naked Heart (1950) – Robert Gagnon
- White Corridors (1951) – Dick Groom
- Private Information (1952) – Hugh
- Father's Doing Fine (1952) – Clifford Magill
- Flannelfoot (1953) – Frank Mitchell
- Meet Mr Lucifer (1953) – Jim
- Stryker of the Yard (1953) – Tony Ashworth
- Dangerous Cargo (1954) – Tim Matthews
- Trouble in the Glen (1954) – Sammy Weller
- The Golden Link (1954) – Bill Howard
- The Sea Shall Not Have Them (1954) – Flying Officer Harding
- Tale of Three Women (1954) – Dick (segment "Thief of London" story)
- Mr. Arkadin (1955) – Marquis of Rutleigh
- A Time to Kill (1955) – Dennis Willows
- Windfall (1955) – John Lee
- Reach for the Sky (1956) – Peel
- That Woman Opposite (1957) – Toby Lawes
- The Admirable Crichton (1957) – Treherne
- The Birthday Present (1957) – Bill Thompson
- Gideon's Day (1958) – Reverend Small
- A Night to Remember (1958) – Fourth Officer Joseph Boxhall
- Chain of Events (1958) – Freddie
- Links of Justice (1958) – Edgar Mills
- The Solitary Child (1958) – Cyril
- Sink the Bismarck! (1960) – Signals Officer
- Nearly a Nasty Accident (1961) – Flight Lt. Grogan
- Three on a Spree (1961) – Michael Brewster
- Mary Had a Little... (1961) – Scott Raymond
- Nothing Barred (1961) – Peter Brewster
- The Queen's Guards (1961) – Capt. Shergold
- Never Back Losers (1961)
- Flat Two (Edgar Wallace Mysteries) (1962) – Frank Leamington
- Who Was Maddox?, (Edgar Wallace Mysteries) (1964) – Jack Heath
- The Nanny (1965) – Dr. Medman
- Follow Me! (1972) – Wealthy Client (uncredited)
- The Adventures of Barry McKenzie (1972) – TV Director
- Father, Dear Father (1973) – Bill Mossman
- 11 Harrowhouse (1974) – Fitzmaurice
- Belles (1983, TV film) – Eddie King
- Slip-Up (1986, TV film) – Champion

=== Television ===
- The Adventures of Robin Hood (1957) – Sir Leon (1 episode)
- The Invisible Man (1958) – Sandy Mason (1 episode)
- William Tell (1958) – Ferdinand (2 episodes)
- Danger Man (1960) – Rollo Waters (1 episode)
- The World of Tim Frazer (1961) – Major Lockwood (4 episodes)
- Hancock (1961) – Producer (1 episode)
- Stryker of the Yard (1961) – Tony Ashworth (1 episode)
- Ghost Squad (1963) – Captain Roy Halstead (1 episode)
- Zero One (1963) – Harwell (1 episode)
- Boyd Q.C. (1963) – George Thrush
- The Plane Makers/ The Power Game (1963-9) – Don Henderson (63 episodes)
- Emergency Ward 10 (1967) – Bill Lloyd (1 episode)
- Doctor Who (1967-8) – Professor Travers (12 episodes)
- Softly, Softly (1968) – Carter (1 episode)
- No – That's Me Over Here! (1968) – Ramsden (1 episode)
- Nearest and Dearest (1969) – Cartwright (1 episode)
- The Newcomers (1969) – Hugh Robertson (32 episodes)
- Paul Temple (1970) – George Cordway (1 episode)
- The Misfit (1971) – Rev. Tim Pritchard (1 episode)
- Jason King (1972) – Geoffrey Winters (1 episode)
- Bright's Boffins (1972) – Col. Dingle White (1 episode)
- Harriet's Back in Town (1972) – Rupert Ashley (2 episodes)
- Pathfinders (1972-3) – Doc Saxon (12 episodes)
- Q5 (1975) – Assorted characters (1 episode)
- The Mackinnons (1977) – Anthony Critchon (1 episode)
- The Many Wives of Patrick – Randolph Milmington (1 episode)
- The Cedar Tree (1978) – Arthur Bourne (13 episodes)
- Doctors' Daughters (1981) – Dr. Roland Carmichael (6 episodes)
- Diamonds (1981) – Julius Frey (4 episodes)
- Andy Robson (1982-3) – Matthew Dennison (14 episodes)
- Rumpole of the Bailey (1983) – Mr. X (1 episode)
- Hot Metal (1986) – PM MacNamara (2 episodes)
- Fortunes of War (1987) – Sir Desmond Hopper (1 episode)
- Life Without George (1989) – William (1 episode)
- Bergerac (1989-90) – Frank Blakemore (4 episodes)
- Jeeves and Wooster (1990) – Lord Wickhammersley (1 episode)
- The House of Eliott (1991) – General Treves (1 episode)
- Crime Story (1992) – Michael Foot M.P. (1 episode)
- The Mixer (1992-3) – Charles (2 episodes)
- Heartbeat (1994) – The Colonel (1 episode)
- Wing and a Prayer (1997) – Judge Duncan Ellery (1 episode)
