= The Slide =

Serial radio program

The Slide is a sci-fi radio serial in seven parts by Victor Pemberton. The story begins with an earthquake in Southern England, and then the local wildlife starts to disappear. It starred Roger Delgado as Professor Josef Gomez, Maurice Denham as Hugh Deverill MP, David Spenser as Dr. Ken Richards and Miriam Margolyes as Mrs. Wilson. The producer was John Tydeman and sound effects were by the BBC Radiophonic Workshop.

The Slide was Victor Pemberton's first science fiction story; it was accepted as a radio serial commissioned by future Doctor Who producer Peter Bryant.

BBC Genome lists the programme as first transmitted on the BBC Light Programme on 13 February 1966 at 19:00 with the next six episodes following weekly. BBC Radio 4 Extra broadcast a repeat run of the serial 10 - 18 August 2020.

== The story in Doctor Who ==
Victor Pemberton originally submitted The Slide to the BBC TV series Doctor Who in 1964; it was rejected by script-editor David Whitaker, but following a revision it did inspire the story Fury from the Deep. The story was to feature the Doctor, Ian, Barbara and Vicki discovering sentient mud invading London from a fishing bay.

In September 2020, the serial was included as a bonus feature on the DVD & Blu-Ray release for the animated reconstruction of Fury from the Deep.
