= Sonic screwdriver =

Fictional tool used by the Doctor in Doctor Who

- Doctor Who element
- The first sonic screwdriver seen in The War Games (1969)
- Publisher: BBC
- First appearance: Fury from the Deep; 16 March 1968
- Created by: (Series): Sydney Newman; C. E. Webber; Donald Wilson; (Story); Victor Pemberton
- Genre: Science fiction

In-universe information
- Type: Hand tool
- Function: Various, see Functions
- Affiliation: The Doctor

The sonic screwdriver is a fictional multifunctional tool in the British science fiction television programme Doctor Who and its spin-offs, used by the Doctor. Like the TARDIS, it has become one of the icons of the programme, and spin-off media such as The Sarah Jane Adventures and Torchwood have replicated its functions in devices such as the sonic lipstick, sonic blaster, sonic probe, sonic modulator and sonic cane.

The sonic screwdriver was introduced in 1968 in the story Fury from the Deep, and used twice more (The Dominators and The War Games) during the Second Doctor's tenure. It became a popular tool for the Third Doctor and Fourth Doctor. It was written out of the series in 1982 due to the limitations it caused when writing for the show. It then featured briefly in the 1996 Doctor Who television movie, before making a full return in the 2005 continuation of the series.

Throughout the programme, there have been many different versions of the sonic screwdriver, as with subsequent Doctors the design of it was changed. It has also been destroyed on a number of occasions, thus leading to the introduction of the next model, though keeping the same data and usage. Not all iterations of the Doctor have used the sonic screwdriver on screen; the Fifth Doctor in fact opted not to replace his after it was destroyed in "The Visitation".

The Twelfth Doctor loses his sonic screwdriver to the creator of the Daleks, Davros, after lending it to him when he was a child. In the last episode of series 9, the Doctor received a new sonic screwdriver from the TARDIS in place of the sonic sunglasses he had been using temporarily in the meantime.

Despite the Doctor's claim not to entrust his screwdriver to anyone, he lends one to his own doppelgänger in "The Rebel Flesh," and again supplies Rory Williams for its third job in his care in "The Girl Who Waited," after having given or loaned Rory one in "A Good Man Goes to War" and slipping him one in "The Big Bang". Before Rory, he lent the screwdriver to Sarah Jane Smith and Rose Tyler to investigate the computer room class in "School Reunion". Afterwards The Doctor made a Sonic Lipstick for Sarah Jane before departing for more adventures. He also gifts one to River Song in "The Husbands of River Song," which is then used by the Tenth Doctor to "save" her life in a previous TV story, "Forest of the Dead."

== Functions ==
The functions of a sonic screwdriver are based on its power over sound waves, radiation, wavelengths, frequencies, signals, and electromagnetism. It is shown to hack, disable, activate, and otherwise control technology from almost everything, allowing it to remotely control almost any machinery, mechanisms, and computers it is applied to, allowing it to open locks, detonate explosives, remotely activate electronics, override most systems, activate computers, and cause some energy weapons to burst into flames or sparks. There is technology the sonic is unable to interface with, such as wood, or the isomorphic controls seen in "A Christmas Carol". It also is capable of causing chemical reactions that allow the Doctor to turn eyeglass lenses black like sunglasses and causing cut barbed wire to regenerate (setting 2428B). It is also capable of detecting, amplifying and controlling certain energies, sound, signals, frequencies, and waves, allowing the Doctor to intercept a teleporting individual and send them where he chooses, scan and identify matter, send out communications, enhance sounds, signals, and frequencies, and acting as a catalyst or conduit for energies. Sonics are also capable of calculations, such as in The Day of the Doctor (2013), when the War Doctor used calculations to allow the sonic to work on wood, the calculations of which appeared partly done on the Tenth Doctor's sonic and completed in the Eleventh's. The War Doctor also used his sonic in tandem with the Tenth and Eleventh's to create a force field wave to repel a Dalek.

These are more specific functions of the sonic screwdriver:

- Unlocking or locking a door
- Burning or cutting certain substances
- Remotely detonating specific machines or explosives
- Amplifying sound waves and the power of an X-ray machine beyond its normal capacities
- Disarming weapons and electronics
- Flashlight
- Intercepting and conducting teleportation
- Hacking an ATM
- Regenerating barbed wire on a fence
- Darkening eyeglass lenses to transform them into sunglasses
- Microphone (when connected to an audio amplifier)
- Detecting and interpreting signals
- Conducting medical scans
- Fixing
- Locking the coordinates of the TARDIS
- Tracking alien life
- Using red setting or dampers
- Controlling the properties of atoms and molecules on a small scale
- Operating computers, whether their origin is alien or human
- Providing geolocation
- Lighting candles
- Creating a force field wave with two (or possibly more) other sonics to physically repel a Dalek (it may have to be the same sonic device at different points in its own time stream)
- Modifying a mobile phone
- Disclosing and deactivating camouflage
- Disarming robotics
- Scanning and classifying matter
- Shattering glass
- Creating an "acoustic corridor" for speaking with someone far away
- Shocking neural centres of living organisms
- Downloading a person's consciousness and transferring it into a computer hard drive (only seen in a special model created by The Doctor as a gift to River Song)
- Triggering particular protocols of the TARDIS
- Tightening and loosening screws
- Resonating concrete
- Creating glass-like walls ("Force Field")
- Creating holographic screens
- Reconstructing the TARDIS
- Hijacking traffic lights
- Creating a field that silences all noise
- Performing advanced calculations

Aside from being a tool, the sonic screwdriver can be used and considered as a defensive weapon, which is effective for a few types of assault weapons, but not designed to kill or injure living things as the only way it can really hurt or incapacitate an organism is by emitting painful bursts of sound, or, as of "Day of the Moon" (2011) by blasting a green wave of energy to incapacitate a target, though only the Eleventh and Twelfth's sonic has been shown to do the latter.

== History ==
=== 1968–1982 and 1996 ===
The sonic screwdriver made its first appearance in the serial Fury from the Deep (1968), written by Victor Pemberton. It was used thereafter by the Second Doctor as a multi-purpose tool, with occasional variations in appearance over the course of the series.

Its abilities and overall appearance varied greatly during the classic series. The name implies that it operates through the use of sound waves to exert physical forces on objects remotely. During the Second Doctor's tenure, it functioned much as its name implied—using sonic waves to dismantle equipment or to bypass locks. In addition, it was used as a welding torch in Episode Five of The Dominators (1968). In the audio commentary for The Sea Devils (1972), Michael Briant claims to have suggested it as a one-off gadget in 1968.

During the Third Doctor's tenure, producer Barry Letts was adamant that the device should not become a cure-all for the series and limited its use to avoid writers becoming over-reliant on it. During this time, the device underwent significant design changes. In The Sea Devils, the Doctor used it to detonate landmines; Michael E. Briant explains that this was feasible, stating that the sonic waves shook the mines. In The Three Doctors (1972–73), the sonic screwdriver is almost unrecognisable, being a unique, one-use prop with a plastic red spherical head. In the DVD commentary, Letts himself remarks on the thickness of the prop and the fact that it belies the idea that it was the regular one, prompting Katy Manning to question whether it was indeed a sonic screwdriver. This was due to the serial being produced out of transmission order: the original sonic screwdriver prop went missing during the recording of Carnival of Monsters (1973), requiring a new prop to be built for the rest of the season; The Three Doctors was recorded after Carnival, but set before it, so the screwdriver could be seen to revert to its previous appearance for one story after The Three Doctors before receiving a more permanent redesign thereafter.

During the first three years of the Fourth Doctor's tenure, producer Philip Hinchcliffe further reduced the use of the sonic screwdriver. Exceptions include Robot (which was the last story to be produced by Barry Letts), where it was again used to detonate mines, and as a "miniature sonic lance" (Note: The Sixth Doctor uses a hand tool he calls a "sonic lance" in Attack of the Cybermen) to cut out a lock. Aside from unlocking doors, the device was greatly downplayed during the Fourth Doctor's second and third seasons. It saw a resurgence once Graham Williams took over as producer in 1977. In the final story of season 15, The Invasion of Time, the Fourth Doctor conceded, "Not even the sonic screwdriver can get me out of this one."

It featured regularly in season 16 during the Key to Time saga. The Doctor's Time Lady companion Romana constructed a sonic screwdriver of her own similar to the Doctor's. It is depicted as being smaller and sleeker than the Doctor's, and he was sufficiently impressed with her design that he attempted to swap screwdrivers with her in The Horns of Nimon (1979–80). By season 18, both script editor Christopher H Bidmead and producer John Nathan-Turner were eager to downplay the device as much as possible.

The sonic screwdriver was written out of the series late in season 19, in the Fifth Doctor serial The Visitation (1982). It is destroyed by a Terileptil to prevent the Doctor from escaping a holding cell; in response, the Doctor sorrowfully remarked, "I feel as if you've just killed an old friend." Eric Saward later explained in a 2005 DVD interview that this was done on the instructions of producer John Nathan-Turner. Saward had written out the sonic screwdriver, believing that the Doctor had "a cupboard full of them" in the TARDIS. On the basis that a device that could help in any situation was very limiting for the script, Nathan-Turner decided that it would not return. The Tenth Doctor joked about the Fifth Doctor's lack of sonic screwdriver in the mini-episode "Time Crash" (2007), commenting that he "went hands-free" and could "save the universe using a kettle and some string." The device did not appear again for the remainder of the original series.

In the Doctor Who TV Movie (1996) and "The Night of the Doctor" (2013), the Seventh (TVM), Eighth (both), and the War Doctor ("The Night of the Doctor") were seen to have a new sonic screwdriver with a telescopic mechanism, similar to its predecessors but with subtle differences such as a gold/brass band on the handle, a flat base, and a red emitter tip.

=== 2005–2010 ===
A redesigned sonic screwdriver appears in the new series, with a blue light in addition to the sound effect. In its first incarnation, the prop used in the new series was fragile and prone to breakage. Over the course of the next two years, the props were continually repaired and modified, with some additions being a new thumb slider design and different colours of wires used in the clear channel when extended.

For series 4 (2008), a new design of Screwdriver was commissioned by the BBC. Nick Robatto was hired to make two new props. These featured the final slider design, and redesigned body ridges, among other smaller changes. This design debuted in 2008's "Partners in Crime" and continued to be used until the Screwdriver's ultimate destruction in 2010's "The Eleventh Hour". This later design has gained the nickname "Series 3–4 Sonic" (relating to the fact that at the start of Series 3, in "Smith and Jones", the first Sonic Screwdriver was supposedly destroyed), even though strictly speaking it first appeared in Series 4.

In contrast with Nathan-Turner's attitude that the sonic screwdriver should not be used as a cure-all, the new production team gave it even more functionality than previous versions. Some of the uses in the new series include: repairing electronic equipment; re-attaching materials such as barbed wire; detecting, intercepting and sending signals; remotely operating the TARDIS; burning, cutting, or igniting substances; fusing metal; scanning and identifying substances; amplifying or augmenting sound; modifying mobile phones to enable "universal roaming"; disabling alien disguises; resonating concrete; reversing teleportation of another entity. It is sometimes used to disassemble robotic enemies or turn other objects into weapons, healing cuts and wounds. In "The Parting of the Ways" (2005) and "Utopia" (2007), it is used to operate the TARDIS controls remotely; when the Doctor attempts to counteract the Master's theft of the TARDIS, it is used to limit the TARDIS' destination. In "Doomsday" (2006), the Doctor states that the sonic screwdriver does not kill, wound or maim; however, it is sometimes brandished in a threatening manner, such as in "The Christmas Invasion" (2005), "The Impossible Planet" (2006), "The Runaway Bride" (2006), "The Lazarus Experiment" (2007), "The Day of the Doctor" (2013), and The Infinite Quest (2007). In "World War Three" (2005), when confronted by a group of Slitheen, the Doctor threatens to "triplicate the flammability" of a bottle of port wine with the sonic screwdriver, though one of the Slitheen realises he is bluffing. In "Closing Time" (2011), ringed energy beams are seen emitted from the device, giving it a more weapon-like appearance, particularly when used to disable a weakened Cyberman at a distance.

In "Smith and Jones", the sonic screwdriver burns out after the Doctor uses it to amplify the radiation output of a hospital X-ray machine. In the "Series Three concept Artwork Gallery", when referring to the burnt out sonic screwdriver, Peter McKinstry says "the green crystal structure visible under the shattered dome refers back to the TARDIS console crystal. It's the same technology – the TARDIS's little brother." Though initially saddened at the loss of the screwdriver, the Doctor obtains a new one at the conclusion of the episode.

The sonic screwdriver is unable to open a "deadlock seal", used as a plot device to prevent an easy solution. Russell T Davies once mentioned that he would never make the sonic screwdriver the solution to an episode. In "Silence in the Library" (2008), while trying to open a wooden door, the Doctor tells Donna that the sonic screwdriver will not work because the door is made of wood, a fact later restated in "The Hungry Earth" (2010); when Rory complains about this, the Doctor counters to not "diss the sonic." The sonic screwdriver's inability to work on wood is clarified in "In the Forest of the Night" (2014), when the Doctor states that the sonic screwdriver works by manipulating the moving parts in various machinery: since plant tissue lacks said moving parts, it is unaffected by the sonic screwdriver. In "The Parting of the Ways" (2005), the Doctor mentions that when Emergency Program One was activated, the sonic screwdriver would receive a signal from the TARDIS. In "Forest of the Dead" (2008), he claims that a few hair-dryers can interfere with the device, though he states that he is "working on that".

=== 2010–2015 ===
In "The Eleventh Hour" (2010), the malfunctioning sonic screwdriver is destroyed when the Doctor tries to signal the Atraxi ships. The Doctor later receives a new one, which emerges from the newly regenerated TARDIS console. The Eleventh Doctor's sonic screwdriver is larger than its predecessor; it has a green light and metal claws that extend with a flick of the wrist. It is shown to have been created by the TARDIS as part of its automatic regeneration.

In "A Christmas Carol" (2010), the Doctor advises a young Kazran Sardick to pursue romance while implying that in a similar situation in his own past he had instead gone to his room to "design a new kind of screwdriver." Also in that episode, the sonic screwdriver gets split into two pieces, one of which ends up inside a flying shark. The remaining piece is said to be signalling its other half in an effort to repair itself. The Doctor uses this to send a signal through the half inside the sky shark to open up the clouds. Afterwards, the half not in the shark is left with Kazran Sardick. The Doctor tells Kazran that he can call him for help using the Sonic; though Kazran declines to do so. The Doctor had duplicates of this screwdriver, which he continued to use throughout his travels.

In "Let's Kill Hitler" (2011), it is explained that instead of having settings, this version operates through a psychic interface, basically doing whatever the user thinks of while pointing and holding down the button. This version of the screwdriver also appears, although never officially announced, to have a flashlight setting, as the Doctor is seen to have it emitting a continuous glow while not uttering the classic sonic noise. Also in the episode, the Doctor uses another modified version of his sonic, which he calls a "Sonic Cane". It is similar to a Tuxedo cane, except the top is replaced with the upper portion of his screwdriver, with a metal ball cut in fourths attached to the claws.

Ahead of the 50th anniversary special, a mini-episode entitled "The Night of the Doctor" (2013) was produced in which the Eighth Doctor uses the sonic screwdriver twice. The Doctor uses his telescopic screwdriver previously seen in the TV movie, rather than his updated steampunk version, which had been used in numerous Big Finish audio dramas.

For the 50th anniversary special, "The Day of the Doctor" (2013), another version was seen in the hands of John Hurt's War Doctor. The design was similar to the one used by Tom Baker's Fourth Doctor. This time the halo and bullet tip had been removed, replaced by a red light as well as a large red dial added to the base. Character Options released a version of this sonic screwdriver on 23 November 2013 at London's ExCel labelling it "The Other Doctor's Sonic". It was established as a plot point in that episode that the sonic screwdrivers employed by various Doctor incarnations all use the same software, something the War Doctor exploited by running a calculation over a course of several centuries with the Tenth and Eleventh Doctors seeing the calculation completed through their models. It is also directly implied after the fact that the sonic screwdriver has actually been a part of every doctor's retinue, despite its disappearance for doctors six & seven; the Tenth Doctor says to the Gallifreyan high command, as all thirteen doctors are about to change history by saving the planet, that the calculations for doing what's about to be done have been "running all my lives." In addition, when combined, the screwdrivers of the War, Tenth, and Eleventh Doctor could create a sonic force field blast to repel and destroy a Dalek.

"The Magician's Apprentice" (2015) shows that the sonic screwdriver can create "an acoustic corridor" so that the Twelfth Doctor can communicate with a boy trapped in an extraterrestrial minefield. However, when the Doctor discovers that the boy is actually a young Davros, he abandons the boy, leaving the screwdriver behind, though it is revealed that he did save young Davros after all. Davros is shown to have kept the screwdriver in his possession ever since, and the Doctor tells Clara that he no longer has a screwdriver. By that time, the screwdriver had been withered and damaged by time and was seemingly useless.

==== Sonic sunglasses ====
In his first appearance at the beginning of series nine of Doctor Who, the Doctor is seen wearing black Ray-Ban sunglasses ("The Magician's Apprentice"), and he says that he no longer has his sonic screwdriver. Later, in "The Witch's Familiar", he unveils that the sunglasses are actually a wearable version of the screwdriver, claiming that he is "over" screwdrivers: "They spoil the line of your jacket." The glasses are used by the Doctor, and Clara on occasion, throughout the ninth series.

The sonic sunglasses appear to have the same basic functions as the traditional sonic screwdriver, such as scanning objects, while having features not seen before:

- Allowing the Doctor to hear people talking, even if they are several yards away and surrounded by loud noises ("The Magician's Apprentice").
- Reassembling the TARDIS after it has used its Hostile Action Dispersal System to avoid destruction by the Daleks ("The Witch's Familiar").
- Creating and controlling a sophisticated hologram of the Doctor through a WiFi system ("Before the Flood").
- Erasing alien encoding inside people's brains by having them don the glasses for a few minutes ("Before the Flood").
- Reading Internet pages and e-mail ("The Zygon Inversion" and "Extremis").
- Communicating with Gallifreyan battle cruisers ("Hell Bent").

The glasses appear to be more susceptible to damage than the screwdriver; in "The Girl Who Died", a Viking warrior takes the glasses off the Doctor's face and easily breaks them in half. Nevertheless, the glasses continue to appear via replacement or repair until the end of the season. They return the following season during the Doctor's temporary period of blindness, showing the ability to scan his surroundings and transmit the information to his brain, as well as transmit any data recorded to them. However, while he is able to tell things about a person such as height, weight, gender, age, and even heart rate, he does not get enough detail to know faces, clothing, etc. ("Extremis") He was once able to tell that a person was holding a computer tablet, but not what was written on it, as well as 'see' a combination lock but not the numbers. ("The Pyramid at the End of the World") In his final adventure, the Doctor uses the glasses briefly to examine the Testimony interface, much to the confusion and irritation of the First Doctor ("Twice Upon a Time").

=== 2015–2017 ===
In "Hell Bent", the TARDIS gives the Doctor a brand new sonic screwdriver. The new screwdriver has a TARDIS-blue shaft with gold and silver highlights. The upper half is a rectangular light grid that, when switched on, has four different functions: a green light with a low-pitched sound, a blue light with a high-pitched sound, green lights that pulse with a pulsing sound, and a blue light chasing pattern with a pulsing sound. The new sonic screwdriver is meant to represent the TARDIS. The Doctor first uses it in "The Husbands of River Song" (although he also employs the sonic screwdriver earlier in the episode). The new screwdriver has seen use in the spin-off show Class, where the Doctor increases the voltage of floodlights to expel the Shadow Kin and partially close a rift in space-time. He is shown to have working copies of every version of the Sonic Screwdriver ever seen before in a cup on his desk in "The Pilot." Nardole uses the Fifth Doctor's version when sealing bulkhead doors to keep out Daleks later in the episode.

=== 2018–2022 ===
In "The Woman Who Fell to Earth", the Thirteenth Doctor is depicted constructing a new sonic screwdriver out of scrap metal and an orange glowing device from an alien travel capsule. She proudly proclaims that the new screwdriver is forged out of "Sheffield steel". This iteration of the sonic screwdriver glows throughout its body with an orange light when activated. It was destroyed by a Dalek in part seven of the Doctor Who Magazine comic strip "Liberation of the Daleks" while in the Fourteenth Doctor's possession.

=== 2023 (60th Anniversary Specials) ===
A redesigned sonic screwdriver, made of steel and brass with a long metal protrusion, made its debut at San Diego Comic-Con on 19 July 2023. The screwdriver appears to be an amalgamation of different elements from the show, such as the TARDIS Roundels, the Daleks' guns, and the Master's Laser Screwdriver and was used by the Fourteenth Doctor in the 60th Anniversary Specials.

In the first of the specials, "The Star Beast", this screwdriver is shown to have upgraded functionality, such as being able to draw out maps and graphs and also being able to create energy shields to block a corridor.

The screwdriver plays no part in the second special "Wild Blue Yonder", as the Doctor leaves it plugged into the TARDIS to help the machine repair; the TARDIS takes off by itself, with the screwdriver, shortly into the story.

=== 2023–present ===
In December 2023, a reinvention of the sonic screwdriver was introduced for the Fifteenth Doctor. The design is radically different from previous versions, with the shape now resembling a remote control rather than a screwdriver. Gatwa revealed a Gallifreyan script on the sonic, which translates to "the sharpness of the tongue defeats the sharpness of the warrior", a Rwandan proverb. The sonic also contains a crystal power source and a "USB"-style port which allows it to be connected to other technologies.

According to Phil Sims, production designer, Davies initially expected that the Fifteenth Doctor would continue to use the previous Fourteenth Doctor sonic screwdriver, "the same way he'd inherit the TARDIS". Davies later changed his mind, believing it was important for "the new Doctor to have a new sonic". Michael van Kesteren, prop art director, said that he struggled to come up with a concept; adding that the team had been "quietly hoping not to have to do another one for a while", as the creation of the previous sonic was "such a complicated, time-consuming process". Sims opened it up as a "competition" to the art department, with the brief asking for it to be "funky", "something different" and not limited to "a stick that we point at people". Davies was interested in changing the shape of the sonic as he worried that it looked too much like a gun:

This new Doctor for 2024, I worry that sometimes the old sonic starts to look like a gun — like a weapon that gets pointed like a weapon. And I wanted to just cool that down and check that out.

He also wanted it to be "something every kid would want for Christmas". Jason Davies-Redgrave, art department co-ordinator, wanted to think "as far out of the box" as he could, and sketched ideas based on a flip phone, a pebble, and an "alien croissant". The sketches were divisive at first, with Joel Collins, executive producer, elaborating that "if you'd got out of bed on the wrong side, you might have looked at what Jason had drawn, gone, 'What is that?', and thrown it in the corner". Davies strongly supported the sketches, specifically the sketch labelled 'Organic Pebble Teddy Bear version.' The art department's challenge was to translate the chosen sketch into a 3D-printed physical prop. The Sonic was designed to be "fully-functioning" with touch controls. Initially, an "all-metal version" was considered, but deemed too expensive. The prop required around 50 component parts, a rechargeable battery, and elastic band technology.

== Other appearances ==
=== Licensed media ===
==== BBC Books ====
- The Past Doctor Adventures novel The Murder Game, set after The Power of the Daleks, has the Second Doctor escaping from a locked room with a box-shaped sonic device, in which he muses on the advantages of building a smaller model. The novel Dreams of Empire by Justin Richards, set after The Ice Warriors and before Fury from the Deep, features the Second Doctor using the device to break through a concrete wall. Stories with the device used by the Second Doctor before the screwdriver's first on-screen appearance are plausible as the Doctor in that story indicates that the machine "never fails", implying its successful use before that adventure.
- The More Short Trips short story "Special Weapons", set late in season 24, indicates that the Seventh Doctor has a sonic screwdriver.
- The Eighth Doctor Adventures novel, Father Time, features an amnesiac Doctor attempting to recreate the sonic screwdriver with 1980s technology, eventually producing a bulky device nicknamed the "sonic suitcase".
- In the Ninth Doctor Adventures novel The Clockwise Man the sonic screwdriver is used to cauterise wounds, as a soldering iron, and to stop a clockwork mechanism. In The Monsters Inside it is used to provide light, but runs out of power in the process. In Winner Takes All the Doctor fails to open a lock with it and concludes that it "hints at alien involvement". It is used to examine electronic standing stones in The Deviant Strain. In Only Human it is used to restrain someone by welding wires to a chair; in the same novel the Doctor informs Quelly that the device contains 29 computers.
- In the Tenth Doctor Adventures novel The Stone Rose, the sonic screwdriver is used to sedate animals. In The Nightmare of Black Island it is used to provide light. In The Last Dodo it is used to distract animals, and to liquefy and re-solidify tarmac. In Peacemaker, it is used to stop bullets and to dismantle guns.

==== Big Finish audio dramas ====
- In the Big Finish audio drama Pier Pressure, Evelyn Smythe mentions that although the Sixth Doctor did not possess a sonic screwdriver, he fondly remembered it as his "door key". The Sixth Doctor uses his fingernails as a stand-in for the screwdriver as an escape method in The Nowhere Place.
- The Seventh Doctor uses the device in The Harvest and Dreamtime. His companions Ace and Hex use the device in the Doctorless audio drama, The Veiled Leopard.
- In Sword of Orion, the Eighth Doctor reveals that his sonic screwdriver has a torch built into the handle. In The Dying Days he uses the device to reflect the sonic cannon of an Ice Warrior back at his attacker. In Blood of the Daleks he uses it to trace a transmission beam.

==== Doctor Who comics ====
- In an untitled story by Gary Russell featured in the first issue of IDW Publishing's Doctor Who comic book (published February 2008), the Tenth Doctor uses his sonic screwdriver to destroy a sword and later sacrifices it in order to defeat a Sycorax hunter. Later, he indicates that he needs time to "grow" a new sonic screwdriver.

==== Virgin Adventures ====
- The Seventh Doctor regained his sonic screwdriver in the Virgin New Adventures novels, with its first reappearance in The Pit.
- The Virgin Missing Adventures novel Venusian Lullaby established that the First Doctor had a sonic screwdriver.

=== Red Nose Day ===
- In the Red Nose Day special, The Curse of Fatal Death, the final regeneration of the Doctor, played by Joanna Lumley, enthusiastically remarks that the sonic screwdriver "has three settings" when it starts vibrating, implying that one of its functions is that of a Vibrator sex toy.
- In a comic The Catherine Tate Show sketch, Catherine Tate's teenage character Lauren Cooper accuses her English teacher (played by David Tennant) of being "the Doctor". After much provocation, the teacher uses the sonic screwdriver to transform Lauren into a Rose Tyler action figure.

=== Unlicensed media ===
- The unlicensed fan fiction novel Time's Champion speculates that the Sixth Doctor has re-built the sonic screwdriver. He used a similar device in The Nightmare Fair, a script which was never produced for television but has been adapted twice.
- In the video game Daleks (published for operating systems of the early 1980s), the Doctor can use the sonic screwdriver to teleport and to defend himself against the Daleks.

=== Public appearances ===
- Matt Smith used the Eleventh Doctor's sonic screwdriver to turn on the Christmas Lights in Cardiff in November 2010. Its appearance was cheered by the crowd. During the Doctor Who panel at San Diego Comic-Con in 2018, Jodie Whittaker produced the new sonic screwdriver, prompting applause from the audience.

== Related devices ==
=== Doctor Who ===
- The Doctor has used other sonic devices similar to the sonic screwdriver, including the "door handle" of Inferno (Liz Shaw having one of her own) and a pen-sized white noise generator in Four to Doomsday.
- In the 1965 episode Trap of Steel, the Doctor uses an apparently ordinary screwdriver to examine the metal of the Drahvin spaceship and other tasks.
- In the 1979 serial City of Death, Count Scarlioni's henchmen use a "sonic knife" to cut the glass in front of the Mona Lisa.
- In the 1985 serial Attack of the Cybermen, the Sixth Doctor uses a "sonic lance".
- In the 2005 episodes "The Empty Child" and "The Doctor Dances", Jack Harkness uses a "sonic blaster", referred to by Rose Tyler as a "squareness gun", capable of "digitising" structures by disintegrating them and then reversing the process, among other functions. The device resurfaces in "Silence in the Library" and "Forest of the Dead", now wielded by River Song. Steven Moffat confirmed in an episode of Doctor Who Confidential that the device was the same one.
- In "Smith and Jones", Martha Jones sarcastically asks if he's got a "laser spanner" as well as a sonic screwdriver, which he apparently did until it was stolen by Emmeline Pankhurst, described by the Doctor as a "cheeky woman".
- In "The Sound of Drums", the Master reveals his laser screwdriver. Unlike the sonic screwdriver, it is used as a weapon that can kill as well as artificially age its target, using technology developed by Lazarus Laboratories originally seen in "The Lazarus Experiment". It includes isomorphic controls, allowing only the Master to use the device. The design of the prop was meant to imply that the Master constructed it on Earth, and it was deliberately made larger than the Doctor's sonic screwdriver. Like the Doctor's screwdriver and Sarah Jane's lipstick, the Master's laser screwdriver was also created as a children's toy with sound effects. The laser screwdriver reappears in The Doctor Falls when the Master encounters his later female incarnation, Missy. Again, his screwdriver acts as a weapon, the Master using it to destroy a Cyberman and to kill Missy, shooting her in the back after she stabbed him in the back.
- In the series 4 episode "Partners in Crime", the antagonist Miss Foster is shown using a sonic device identified as a sonic pen, which the Doctor describes as having identical functionality to his screwdriver. It could, however, open deadlocked windows and compartments in the Adipose building that the sonic screwdriver could not. After confiscating and briefly using it, the Doctor throws the sonic pen into a bin. The sonic pen took the form of a sleek, black and silver fountain pen with a blue light at the top and was made into a toy version which was paired with the sonic screwdriver.
- In "Silence in the Library", Professor River Song possesses a slightly bulkier sonic screwdriver, which she claims the Doctor gave to her in his future. The Doctor mentioned that he does not give his screwdriver to anyone. In the following episode, Professor Song mentions that her screwdriver is augmented with a "red setting" and "dampers". It also contains a hidden neural relay linked to River Song, saving her at the episode's conclusion—the purpose for which the future Doctor gave Professor Song the device. A toy version is available. It was revealed in "The Husbands of River Song" that it was the Twelfth Doctor who gave it to River.
- In "Journey's End", Sarah Jane Smith is seen using her own sonic screwdriver, or sonic lipstick to open a door on the Dalek Crucible.
- In the Christmas special The Next Doctor, Jackson Lake, who believes himself to be the Doctor, carries a regular screwdriver which he claims to be sonic. When the Doctor asks "How is it sonic?", Lake replies, "It makes a noise," which he demonstrates by tapping it against a door frame.
- In the series 6 episode "Let's Kill Hitler", the Doctor has a sonic cane which appears to have the same functions as the sonic screwdriver.
- In the series 6 episode "The Girl Who Waited", future Amy Pond has a "Sonic Probe" that she made herself. She claims she calls it a probe and not a screwdriver because that's what it is, and to signify that she has come to hate the Doctor. Later after she has forgiven him, she calls it a sonic screwdriver.
- Blue Peter announced that there will be three Sonic devices that will feature in Series 8 of Doctor Who, designed by Blue Peter watchers. The first device is a Sonic Gauntlet for Jenny Flint that will feature making locks fall apart, radioactivity counter and receiver dish, that will allow you to watch shows. The Second device is a Sonic Lorgnette for Commander Strax that has medical applications, such as X-ray, diagnostic lens (check for illness), and thermal lens. The third device is Sonic Hat Pin for Madame Vastra that can be used as a remote control for her carriage and it can also be turned into a Sonic Sword with the flick of a switch.

=== The Sarah Jane Adventures ===
In the Doctor Who spin-off series, The Sarah Jane Adventures, Sarah Jane Smith uses a "sonic lipstick", which is a gift the Tenth Doctor gave her alongside a new model of K9 and her scanner watch. It functions much like the sonic screwdriver, used primarily for opening and closing locked doors, and for disabling and re-enabling machines. Like the sonic screwdriver, it remains ineffective against deadlock seals and wooden objects. A toy version is available.

- In Enemy of the Bane, Mrs Wormwood (Samantha Bond) possesses a sonic device disguised as a ring called the "Phonic disruptor".

=== Torchwood ===
- In the Doctor Who spin-off series Torchwood episode "Fragments", genius Toshiko Sato's backstory reveals that she stole faulty designs from the Ministry of Defence and UNIT, which she used to construct a sonic device, referred to as a "sonic modulator", to trade to a terrorist organisation in exchange for her mother. The device is confiscated by UNIT, which imprisons Sato until she is pardoned and recruited into Torchwood by Jack Harkness.
- In the episodes "Day One" and "End of Days", Captain Jack Harkness uses a green device somewhat similar to a sonic screwdriver. Its origins and function are unknown.
- Toshiko uses a "lockpick" device in a number of episodes, which replicates the door-opening function of the screwdriver.
- In Children of Earth, Gwen Cooper uses a similar device, which she refers to as a Gizmo, to deactivate CCTV cameras.

=== BBC books ===
- In the Eighth Doctor Adventures novel Alien Bodies, the Time Lord Homunculette has a sonic monkey wrench.

== Commercial products ==
Ownership of the sonic screwdriver was retained by the BBC. Victor Pemberton told an interviewer for Doctor Who Magazine, "I'm very cross that the sonic screwdriver—which I invented—has been marketed with no credit to myself. … It's one thing not to receive any payment, but another not to receive any credit."

The toy version of the new series design (made by Character Options Ltd.) was slightly larger than the on-screen version to accommodate a working sound chip. It also includes an ultraviolet light and a changeable invisible ink nib for viewing messages written in the ultraviolet ink.

A metal version of the sonic screwdriver produced by Wow Stuff mounts a functional set of changeable flat and Phillips heads under a removable cover as well as providing light and sound effects.

QMx was given the license to produce accurate replicas of this prop. In 2012, QMx released an "Artisan Master Series" replica of this sonic screwdriver, in a strictly limited run of 25, priced at nearly $5,000. These replicas were handmade by original prop maker Nick Robatto, and have now sold out permanently. QMx later released an Artisan Master Series replica of River Song's sonic screwdriver, limited to a run of 15, also made by original prop maker Nick Robatto, which has also sold out.

The Wand Company released a universal remote control styled on the Eleventh Doctor's sonic screwdriver on 3 August 2012. Due to consumer demand, a Tenth Doctor version was released on 31 October 2013. An updated, extending version of the Eleventh Doctor's Sonic Screwdriver, named the Twelfth Doctor's Sonic Screwdriver Universal Remote Control, was released on 8 July 2015, to replace the older version, which is no longer produced.

Underground Toys has released the War Doctor's sonic screwdriver; titled "The Other Doctor's Sonic Screwdriver", it was released in the UK in November/December 2013 and in the US January 2014.

Character Options has also released toy versions of the Third, Fourth, Fifth, and Eighth Doctors' Sonic Screwdrivers.

Since 2012 Rubbertoe Replicas, the company of Nick Robatto who has been a prop maker for Doctor Who since 2004, offered licensed replicas of various props from Doctor Who including multiple versions of the Sonic Screwdriver.
