= The Abominable Snowmen =

1967 Doctor Who serial

038 – The Abominable Snowmen
- Doctor Who serial
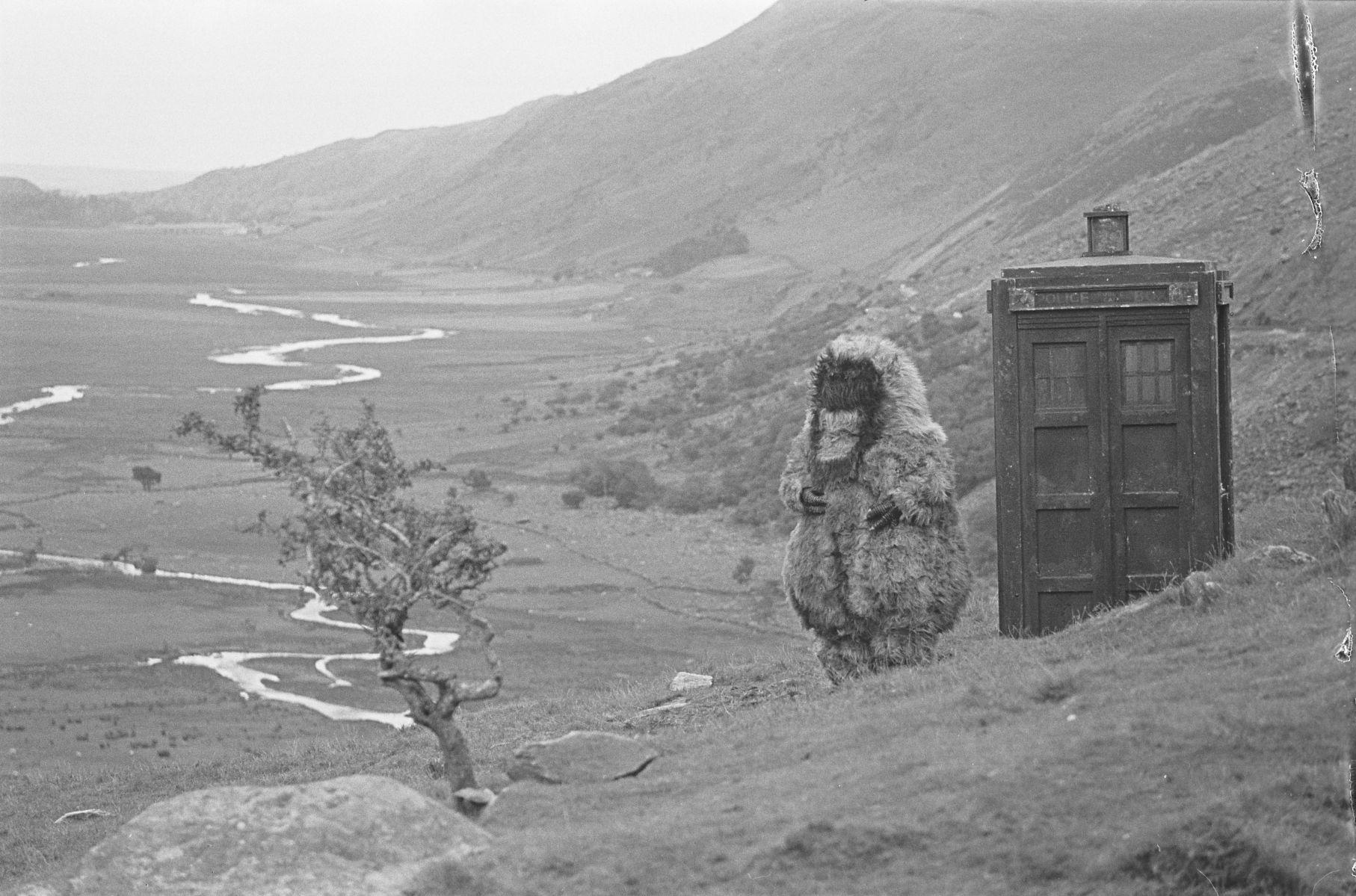
- Filming The Abominable Snowmen serial at Nant Ffrancon, Wales, in 1967

Cast
- Doctor: Patrick Troughton – Second Doctor
- Companions: Frazer Hines – Jamie McCrimmon; Deborah Watling – Victoria Waterfield
- Others: Jack Watling – Professor Travers; Wolfe Morris – Padmasambhava (Note: Wolfe Morris also supplied the voice of the Great Intelligence, uncredited.); Charles Morgan – Songsten; Norman Jones – Khrisong; David Grey – Rinchen; David Spenser – Thonmi; Raymond Llewellyn – Sapan; David Baron – Ralpachan; Reg Whitehead, Tony Harwood, Richard Kerley, John Hogan – Yeti

Production
- Directed by: Gerald Blake
- Written by: Mervyn Haisman; Henry Lincoln
- Script editor: Peter Bryant
- Produced by: Innes Lloyd
- Music by: none (Note: Two stock from the BBC library of recordings of prayers by the Monks of Sakya Set were featured diegetically in episodes 2, 3, 5, and 6, with no other music arranged for the serial.)
- Production code: NN
- Series: Season 5
- Running time: 6 episodes, 25 minutes each
- Episode(s) missing: 5 episodes (1, 3–6)
- First broadcast: 30 September 1967
- Last broadcast: 4 November 1967

Chronology
← Preceded by The Tomb of the Cybermen	Followed by → The Ice Warriors

The Abominable Snowmen is the mostly missing second serial of the fifth season of the British science fiction television series Doctor Who, which originally aired in six weekly parts from 30 September to 4 November 1967. In this serial, the Second Doctor (Patrick Troughton), Jamie McCrimmon (Frazer Hines) and Victoria Waterfield (Deborah Watling) arrive in Tibet in 1935, where they face off against the malicious Great Intelligence and its robot Yeti, who seek to conquer the world. This serial marks the introduction of both antagonists to the series, with both recurring in subsequent Doctor Who media.

The serial was written by Henry Lincoln and Mervyn Haisman, who, after discussing the series with lead actor Patrick Troughton, decided to base a story set on Earth that featured yeti. This led to the creation of the robot Yeti and subsequently the Intelligence. Filming for the serial was done on location in Nant Ffrancon Pass in Snowdonia, and at the time was the longest location shoot performed for the series.

The serial is considered one of the best in the series by fans, with critics highlighting its atmosphere and the Yeti, though some felt the Yeti were too cute to be intimidating antagonists. Only one of the serial's six episodes survives, with the rest remaining missing. Due to the predicted popularity of the serial, a sequel, dubbed The Web of Fear, was commissioned before The Abominable Snowmen had finished airing, and would air in 1968.

== Plot ==
The TARDIS lands in Tibet in the Himalayas, where the Second Doctor (Patrick Troughton) finds a dead body amid the remains of a campsite. The Doctor arrives at Detsen Monastery, where he meets Professor Edward Travers (Jack Watling), who is attempting to find the yeti. Travers believes the yeti cannot be the culprit due to their shy nature, but Victoria (Deborah Watling) and Jamie (Frazer Hines), the Doctor's companions, find a cave of metal control spheres, and a Yeti attacks them.

The Doctor is accused of controlling the Yeti by the monks of the monastery, though Jamie and Victoria are able to convince Travers he is innocent. The latter three return to the monastery and show a control sphere to the group. Padmasambhava (Wolfe Morris), the immortal master of the monastery, instructs one of the monks, Thonmi (David Spenser), to release the Doctor. Shortly afterward, the Yeti attack the monastery, during which one of them is overpowered and rendered dormant. The Doctor deduces it is a robot, controlled by a missing spherical unit from its chest cavity. Padmasambhava orders all of the monks to evacuate.

The Doctor and Jamie find the TARDIS guarded by a Yeti, but the Doctor takes out its control sphere. They head back to the monastery, where Padmasambhava orders Abbot Songsten (Charles Morgan) to open the gates of the monastery, allowing the Yeti to attack. Victoria realises Padmasambhava is the one commanding the Yeti robots, but he wipes her mind and places her in a trance-like state, which the Doctor is able to free her from. Padmasambhava reveals to the Doctor that he is under the control of a being called the Great Intelligence, who possessed him and used his body to partake in an experiment.

The Doctor and Travers learn from Songsten that the Intelligence originally agreed to remain in the cave, and Padmasambhava and some of the monks aided in constructing the Yeti robots, but the Intelligence broke its promise and is bent on controlling the mountain of the monastery and conquering the world. The Doctor, Jamie, and Thonmi destroy the equipment being used to control the robotic Yeti. Padmasambhava dies as the Intelligence leaves him, its plans thwarted. Travers spots a real Yeti in the distance and pursues it as the TARDIS crew departs.

== Production ==
=== Writing and design ===
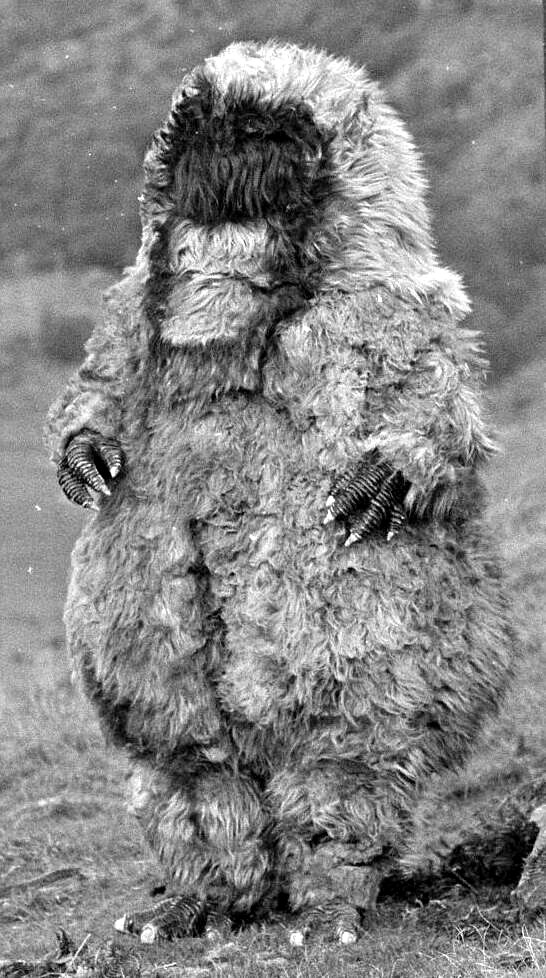
A Yeti as depicted during filming of the serial

The serial got its start after writer Henry Lincoln had spoken with then-lead actor Patrick Troughton, who expressed disappointment in the lack of Earth-bound stories in his first season as the Doctor. Lincoln, working with writer Mervyn Haisman, chose the stories of the yeti as a suitable concept around which to create a serial of the programme, as it was a creature viewers would be familiar with; it could also reasonably be adapted as the creature was never found, and thus was not proven to actually exist. Lincoln and Haisman brought up the idea with Troughton, who was interested and had wanted to be in a story with Yeti. Producer Innes Lloyd was interested in doing an episode set in the Himalayas and also saw the monsters as a potential replacement for the Daleks, which had recently been written out of the programme. The Yeti, alongside other monsters such as the Cybermen and Ice Warriors, were one of many attempts by Lloyd to create such a replacement. The Yeti's debut serial was commissioned for six episodes. Lincoln and Haisman, before they had started scripting, ironed out designs for the Yeti, including the original concept for the Yeti's control spheres. They wanted the Yeti to look cuddly and friendly so that their strength would come as a surprise to viewers. The pair quickly realized the Yeti would likely not be sentient, resulting in the creation of their in-universe master the Great Intelligence to act as their controller.

The Yeti costumes were designed by Martin Baugh for the serial. The original Yeti costume used latex hands and feet, and Cybermat props were reused for elements of the control spheres in the costume's chest. The costume's main body used a bamboo base and was largely one piece, with a second head piece placed on top of the main body. A small slit was available underneath the Yeti's "nose" to act as eyeholes for the actor. Four of these Yeti costumes were produced for the serial. A central box was placed in the costume's chest for the control sphere, which was largely covered by the costume's fur, which could be lifted as needed for shots requiring the control sphere. Actors had to dress lightly underneath the costumes to avoid overheating as it could get hot inside the costumes. A real Yeti, seen briefly at the end of the serial, re-used the original Yeti costume. This Yeti had much of the stuffing and framework removed to allow it to run away, as actors could not move quickly in fully formed Yeti costumes due to the costume's weight.

Mervyn and Haisman went to great pains to ensure authenticity with the Tibetan monks in the serial, reflecting this by naming Padmasambhava after a real-world master of Buddhism. The Second Doctor wears a large fur coat in this serial on top of the character's usual costume; this coat would later be re-used for the Second Doctor's re-appearance in the 1983 episode "The Five Doctors".

Victor Pemberton performed the initial story editing, though Peter Bryant would fill in the post mid-way through the writing process and serve the bulk of the script editor role. Bryant, alongside the production team, predicted the serial would be popular, and thus commissioned a sequel story for it, 1968's The Web of Fear, three days before The Abominable Snowmen had even aired.

=== Casting and characters ===
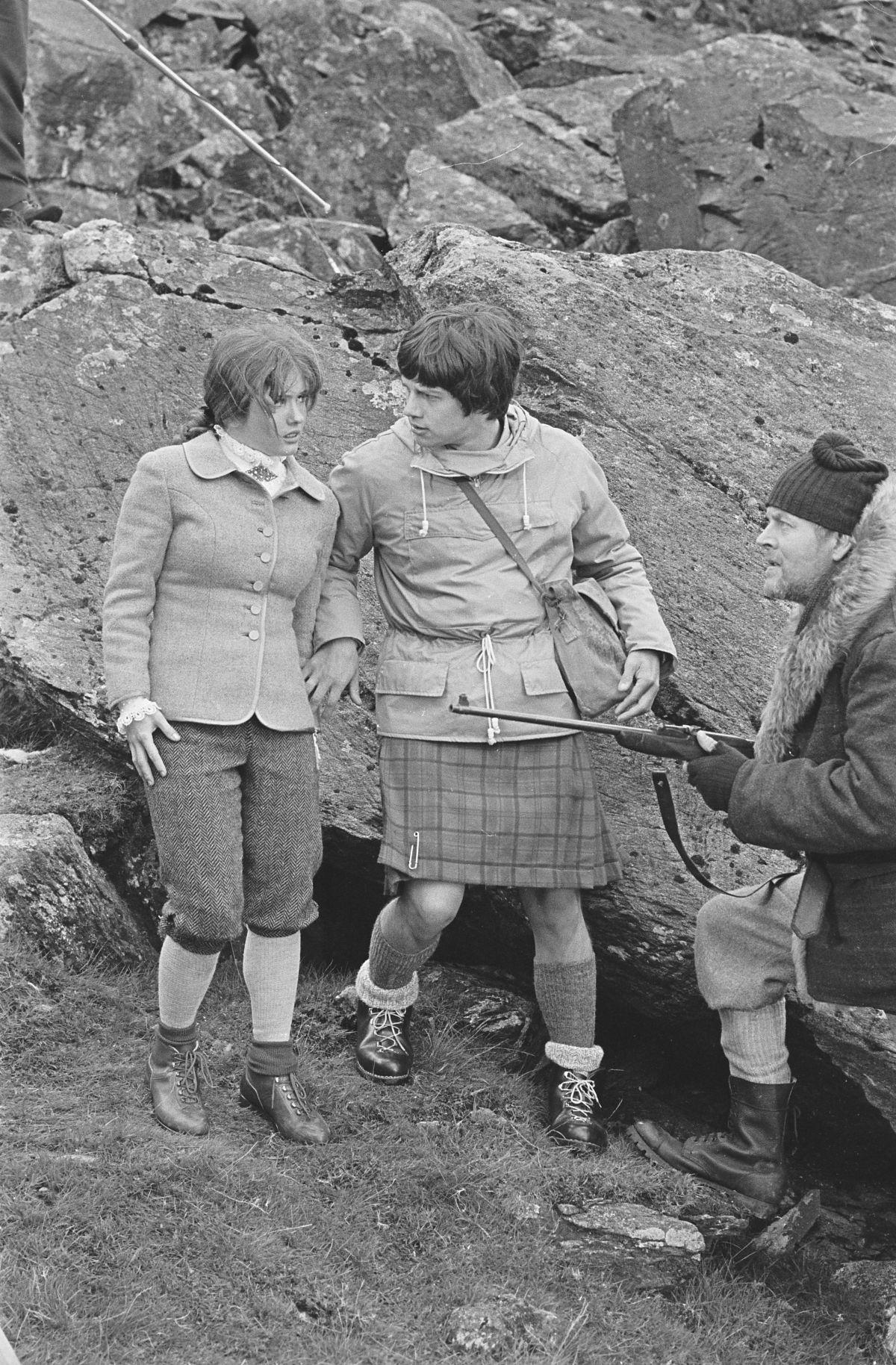
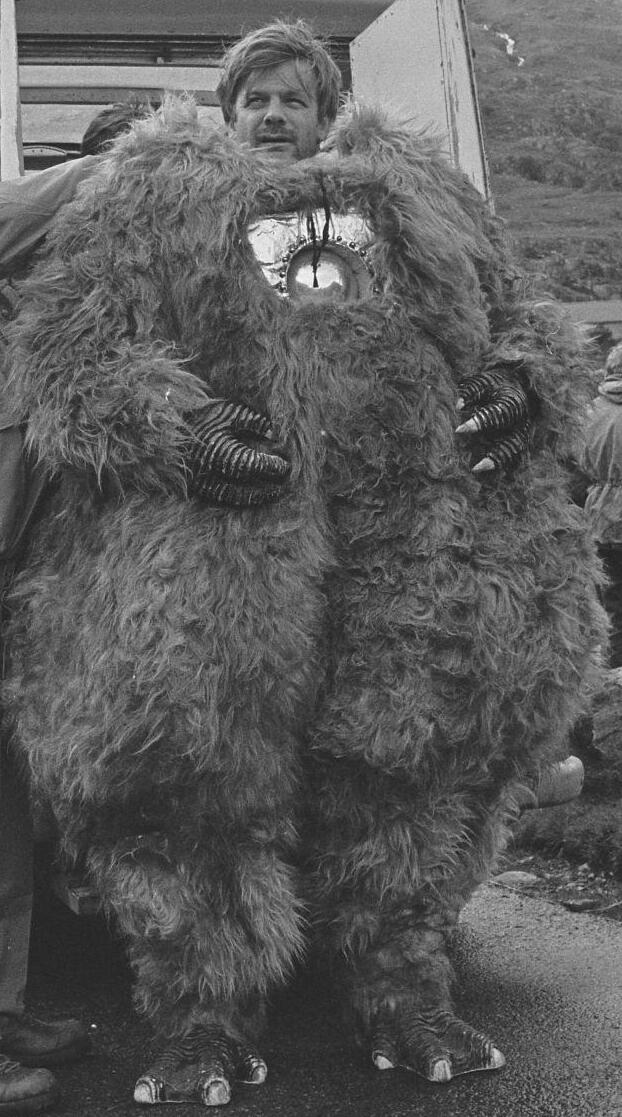
Left: Deborah Watling, Frazer Hines, and Jack Watling on location filming the serial. Right: Reg Whitehead in a Yeti costume

Troughton, Hines, and Watling reprise their main character roles of the Doctor, Jamie, and Victoria, respectively. Professor Travers is played by Jack Watling, and is the father of Deborah Watling. Watling recommended her father for the role, with Lloyd agreeing he was a good fit for the part. Wolfe Morris portrays Padmasambhava and the Intelligence, Charles Morgan portrays Songsten, and David Spenser portrays Thonmi. Reg Whitehead portrays a Yeti and appears in promotional photography for the serial in costume. Other Yeti were portrayed by Tony Harwood, Richard Kerley, and John Hogan.

=== Filming ===
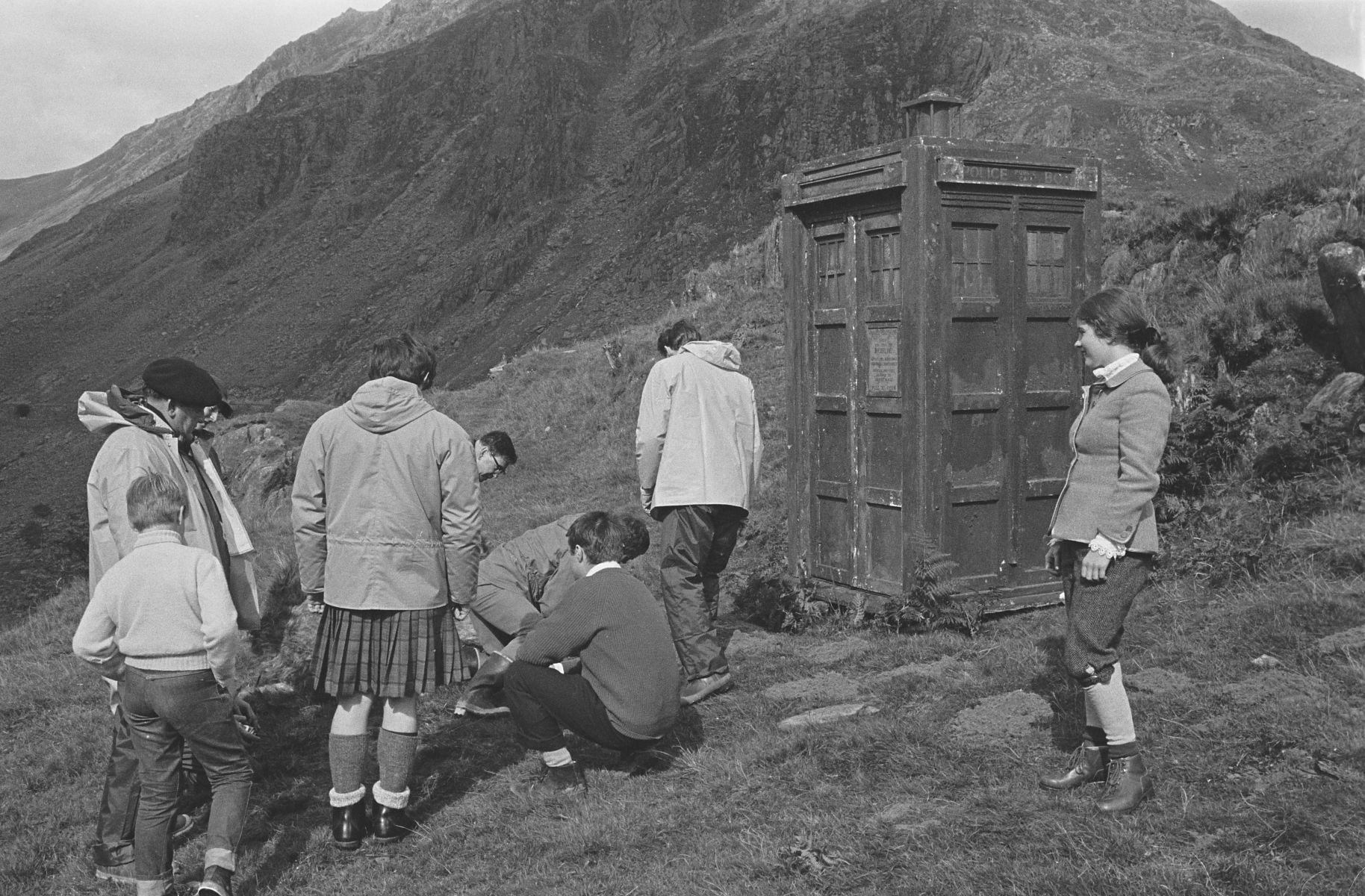
The TARDIS on location during filming at Snowdonia

Scenes for the cave were filmed in Ealing Studios from the 23 to 25 of August. The North Wales mountain pass at Nant Ffrancon in Snowdonia doubled as Tibet for the filming of this serial. Location filming was done there from 4 to 9 September 1967. This six day shoot was, at the time, the longest on-location shoot for the series. Filming in Snowdonia was plagued by heavy rain, which interfered with the first two days of filming, and caused there to be significantly less snow than expected. Rainy weather on location made the Yeti costumes "flop" and thus appear more "cuddly" than originally portrayed. Hairdryers were used to re-fluff the Yetis' costumes after they got too wet. The remainder of filming was done at Lime Grove Studios, with filming wrapping on 14 October 1967.

The slopes needed for the serial's location also became slippery, making filming hazardous for Yeti actors. According to Jack Watling, one of the actors playing the Yeti fell hundreds of feet during filming and was feared dead, but was merely inebriated and fortunately cushioned by the foam rubber inside the costume.

== Broadcast and reception ==
=== Broadcast and ratings ===
Episode	Title	Run time	Original release date	UK viewers (millions)	Appreciation Index
1	"Episode One"	24:15	30 September 1967	6.3	50
2	"Episode Two"	23:15	7 October 1967	6.0	52
3	"Episode Three"	23:55	14 October 1967	7.1	51
4	"Episode Four"	24:11	21 October 1967	7.1	50
5	"Episode Five"	23:51	28 October 1967	7.2	51
6	"Episode Six"	23:31	4 November 1967	7.4	52

The Abominable Snowmen aired from 30 September to 4 November 1967. The serial garnered a healthy audience appreciation rating, ranging from 50 to 52 across the six episodes.

The BBC ordered all six episodes of the serial destroyed in 1969. Though they were retained until 1974, the episodes were confirmed destroyed by 1978. Episode two, however, was kept in the hands of a private collector. It was returned in 1982 after a search for missing episodes was carried out. This episode was later aired at various events over the years, and is presently the only surviving episode of the serial. The other five episodes remain missing; all that remains of them are two short clips, some tele-snaps, and an audio recording of the episodes made by fans. The audio from the second episode, however, cut out during broadcast and was not present on the surviving second episode. The missing audio was reconstructed by splicing together the missing syllables from other clips of Patrick Troughton speaking.

=== Critical reception ===
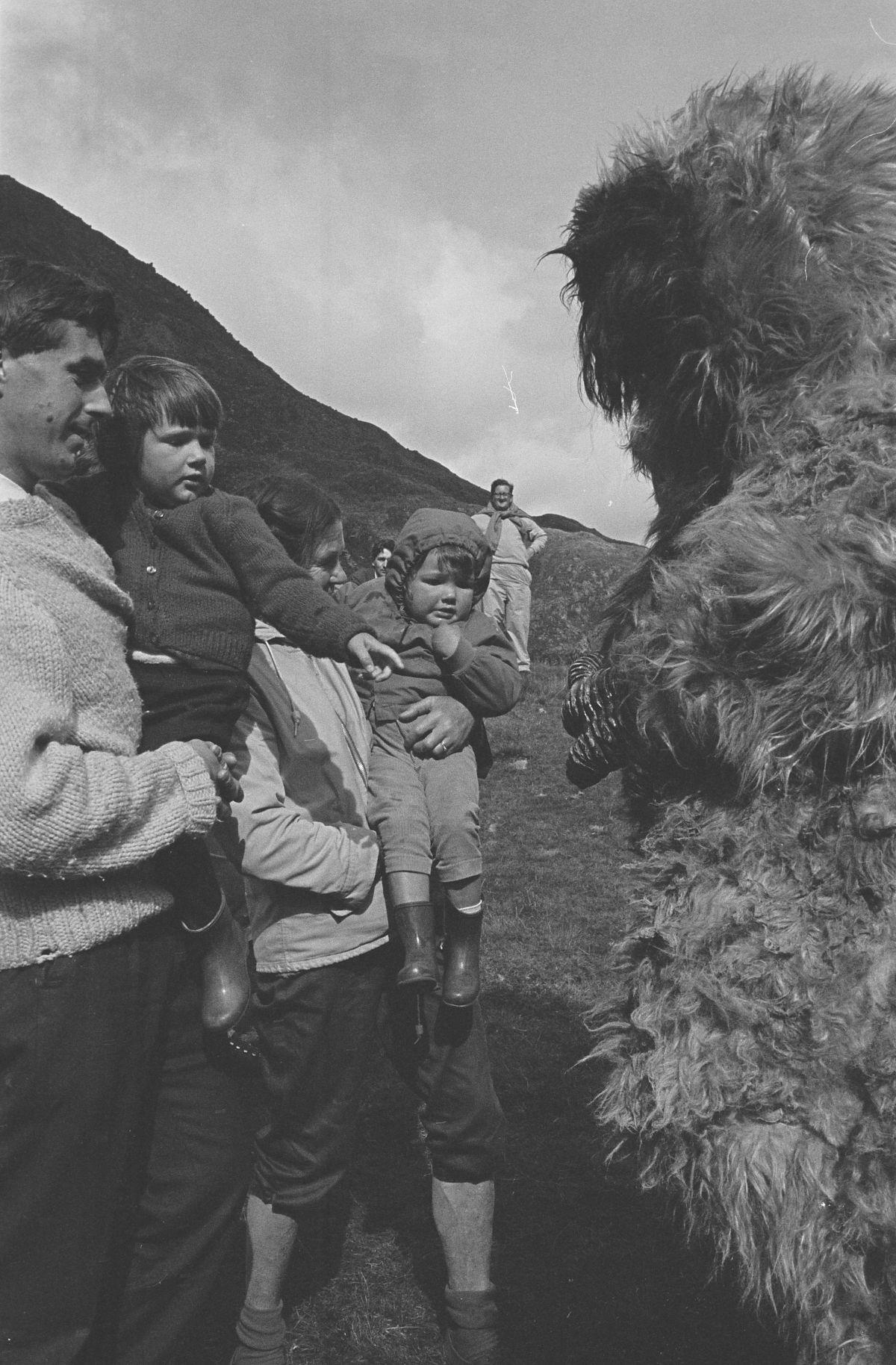
A Yeti interacting with children during the filming of the serial

The Abominable Snowmen is regarded as a classic serial from the show and is well-regarded by fans. In The Television Companion (1998), David J. Howe and Stephen James Walker praised the serial, highlighting its atmosphere and the usage of the Intelligence and Yeti as antagonists. Mark Braxton of Radio Times similarly highlighted its atmosphere, also noting the strong supporting characters and guest performances, particularly Morris's. John Kenneth Muir, a literary critic, highlighted the introduction of the Yeti, finding them to be a well-thought out and creative antagonist.

Paul Cornell, Martin Day, and Keith Topping in The Discontinuity Guide (1995) wrote that the serial was effective, though felt the Yeti were too cute. Paul Mount, writing in Starburst following the release of the serial's animated reconstruction, responded negatively to the serial, finding there to not be much going on, and that the Yeti were too cute to act as intimidating antagonists.

=== Legacy ===
The Intelligence and its Yeti minions would serve as recurring antagonists in the series following the serial's airing. Both would appear again in the 1968 serial The Web of Fear, which served as a sequel to The Abominable Snowmen, and would recur in other media for the series. In the show's 2005 revival, the Great Intelligence would serve as a major antagonist during the revival's seventh series. Travers would return in The Web of Fear, and would recur in later Doctor Who media.

Haisman would later attempt to repurpose The Abominable Snowmen as a novel titled The Yeti, substituting elements of the series such as the Doctor for original characters. Haisman would be unable to find a publisher, and would later attempt to adapt it into a feature film called The Intelligence, with the Doctor replaced by the character Professor Challenger from the 1912 novel The Lost World. Haisman attempted to pitch this to Walt Disney Studios, though it was not adapted.

== Commercial releases ==
=== In other media ===
Doctor Who and the Abominable Snowmen
- Author: Terrance Dicks
- Cover artist: Chris Achilleos
- Series: Doctor Who book: Target novelisations
- Release number: 1
- Publisher: Target Books
- Publication date: 21 November 1974
- ISBN: 0-426-10583-4

A novelisation of this serial, written by Terrance Dicks, was published by Target Books in November 1974. It was the first novelisation of a Second Doctor story. Some of the monks' names were changed for this adaptation as Letts, a follower of Buddhism, believed Haisman and Lincoln's name changes to have been unnecessary and risked causing offense.

The audio soundtrack, along with additional linking narration by Frazer Hines, has been released on MP3 CD, along with The Web of Fear. A collection box entitled "Yeti Attack" contains both Yeti adventures on normal CD. A vinyl release of the soundtrack, also with the Hines narration, was issued by Demon Records on 27 September 2019. This release has since become rare and difficult to come by.

In 1991, Episode 2 was released on VHS as part of "The Troughton Years". In 2004, that episode, along with a handful of clips gathered from other sources, were digitally restored and released on the Lost in Time DVD.

=== Animated recreation ===
On 23 November 2021, it was announced that the story would be released on DVD and Blu-ray, with animations of all six episodes alongside the surviving Episode Two. The animation would alter the designs of the Tibetan monks to more closely reflect real world monks. The reconstruction was released on 5 September 2022. Two days after the animated version of The Abominable Snowmen released, animation director Gary Russell claimed that it would be the final animated reconstruction produced, though left the door open for revivals of the reconstructions in the future.
