= Deborah Watling =

English actress (1948–2017)

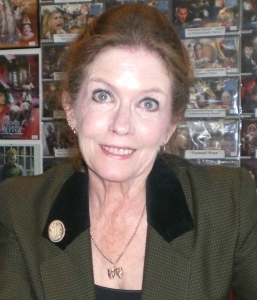
- Watling in 2008
- Born: Deborah Patricia Watling; 2 January 1948; London, England
- Died: 21 July 2017 (aged 69); Frinton-on-Sea, Essex, England
- Education: Braeside School, Buckhurst Hill
- Alma mater: Italia Conti Stage School
- Occupations: Actress; author
- Years active: 1958–2016
- Known for: Doctor Who; Take Me High; That'll Be the Day
- Spouses: Nicholas Field (m. 1980; div. 1983) Steve Turner (m. 1992)
- Father: Jack Watling
- Relatives: Giles Watling (brother); Dilys Watling (maternal half-sister)

Deborah Patricia Watling (2 January 1948 – 21 July 2017) was an English actress who played the role of Victoria Waterfield, a companion of the Second Doctor in the BBC television series Doctor Who from 1967 to 1968. She began her career as a child actress, making her debut as a regular in The Invisible Man (1958–1959). Watling also starred in the films Take Me High (1973) with Cliff Richard and That'll Be the Day (1973) with David Essex as well as playing Julie Robertson in The Newcomers (1969) and Norma Baker in Danger UXB (1979) on television.

== Early life ==
Deborah Patricia Watling was born 2 January 1948 at the Queen Charlotte's and Chelsea Hospital in London, the daughter of actors Jack Watling and Patricia Hicks. Her brother Giles and her half-sister, Dilys, were also actors. She was raised in Epping until the family moved to the 16th-century Alderton Hall in Loughton, Essex. Educated at Braeside School in Buckhurst Hill, Watling considered becoming a dentist before enrolling at the Italia Conti Stage School. Watling made her film debut aged three and started playing background roles in her father's films. During one of her half-sister's parties, Watling started talking to a boy who turned out to be Michael Craze from whom she would take over as a companion in Doctor Who many years later.

== Career ==
Beginning as a child actress, Watling had a regular role as the niece of Peter Brady in The Invisible Man (1958) television series. She was later cast for the lead role in Alice (1965), Dennis Potter's play about Lewis Carroll and Alice Liddell, for the BBC's The Wednesday Play. She co-starred with Cliff Richard in the 1973 film Take Me High, and the same year had a small role in the film That'll Be the Day. She played Norma Baker in the ITV series Danger UXB (1979), and appeared regularly in the theatre.

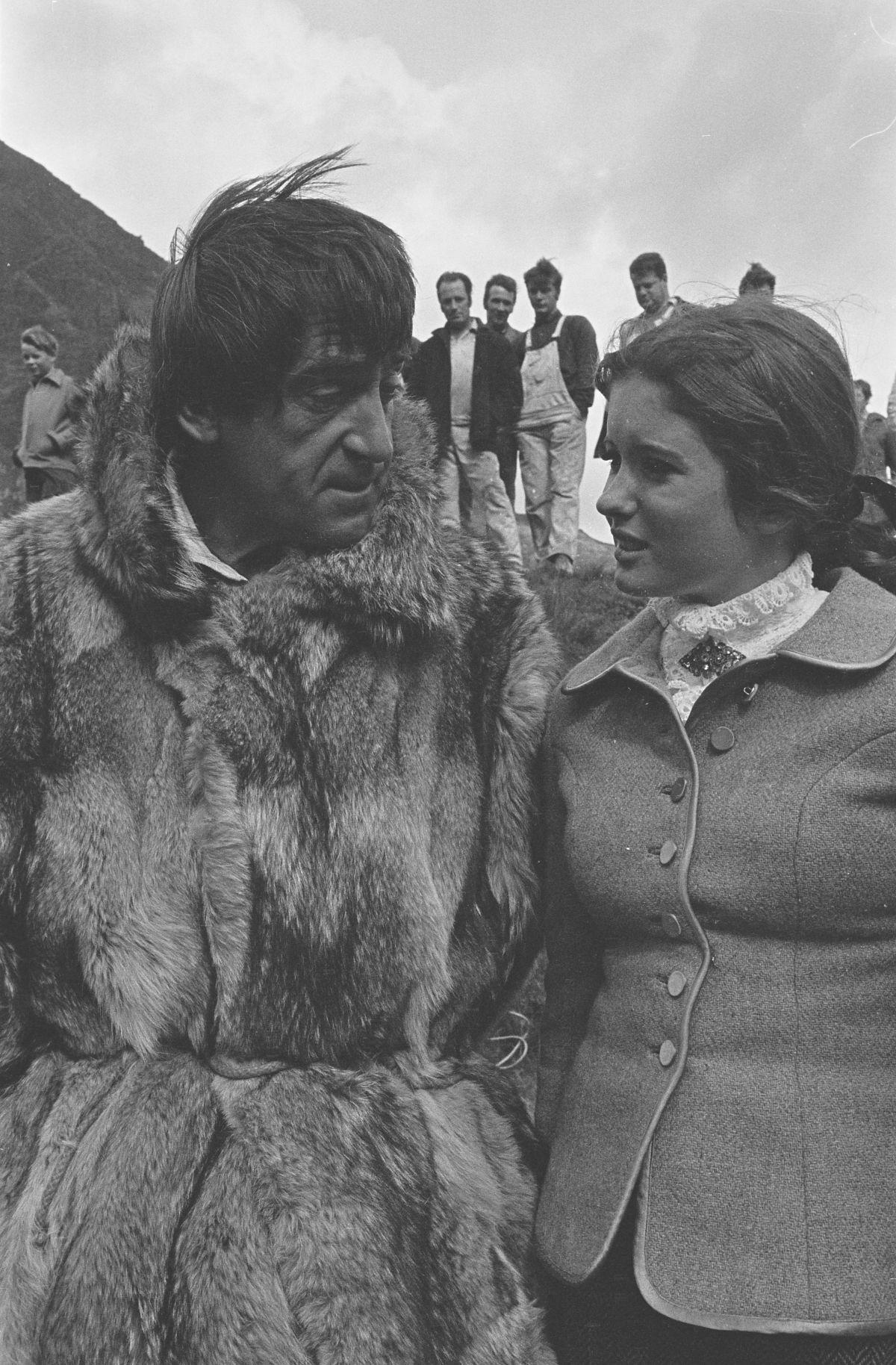
Watling with Patrick Troughton during the filming of The Abominable Snowmen (1967)

According to the short BBC Video documentary The Dalek Factor about the making of the story, released in September 2021 as part of the animated restoration of the serial, Denise Buckley was cast in the role of Victoria Waterfield by director Derek Martinus. The production team had been hoping that Pauline Collins would continue in the role of Samantha Briggs, that she had played in the previous story The Faceless Ones, but had created Victoria as a potential ongoing character should Collins decline. When Collins confirmed she did not want to join the regular cast, it was decided to introduce Victoria as the new companion and Denise Buckley was released, but paid in full, with Watling replacing her as a more suitable actress for the continuing role. Watling played Victoria in Doctor Who from 1967 to 1968, though owing to the BBC's wiping policy of the time, The Tomb of the Cybermen (1967) and The Enemy of the World (1967–1968) are the only serials in which she appeared that still exist in their entirety. She reprised the role in Dimensions in Time (1993) and Downtime (1995). Her favourite missing Doctor Who story was Fury from the Deep. She also briefly dated her co star Frazer Hines.

Watling also appeared in the Doctor Who audio drama Three's a Crowd and regularly attended Doctor Who conventions and events. In November 2013, she appeared in the one-off 50th anniversary comedy homage The Five(ish) Doctors Reboot.

== Personal life ==
In her later years, Watling lived with her husband in Thorpe-le-Soken, Essex, where she directed the local pantomimes. Her autobiography, entitled Daddy’s Girl, was published in 2010.

Watling died on 21 July 2017, aged 69, at Beaumont Manor nursing home in Frinton-on-Sea, six weeks after being diagnosed with lung cancer.

== Filmography ==
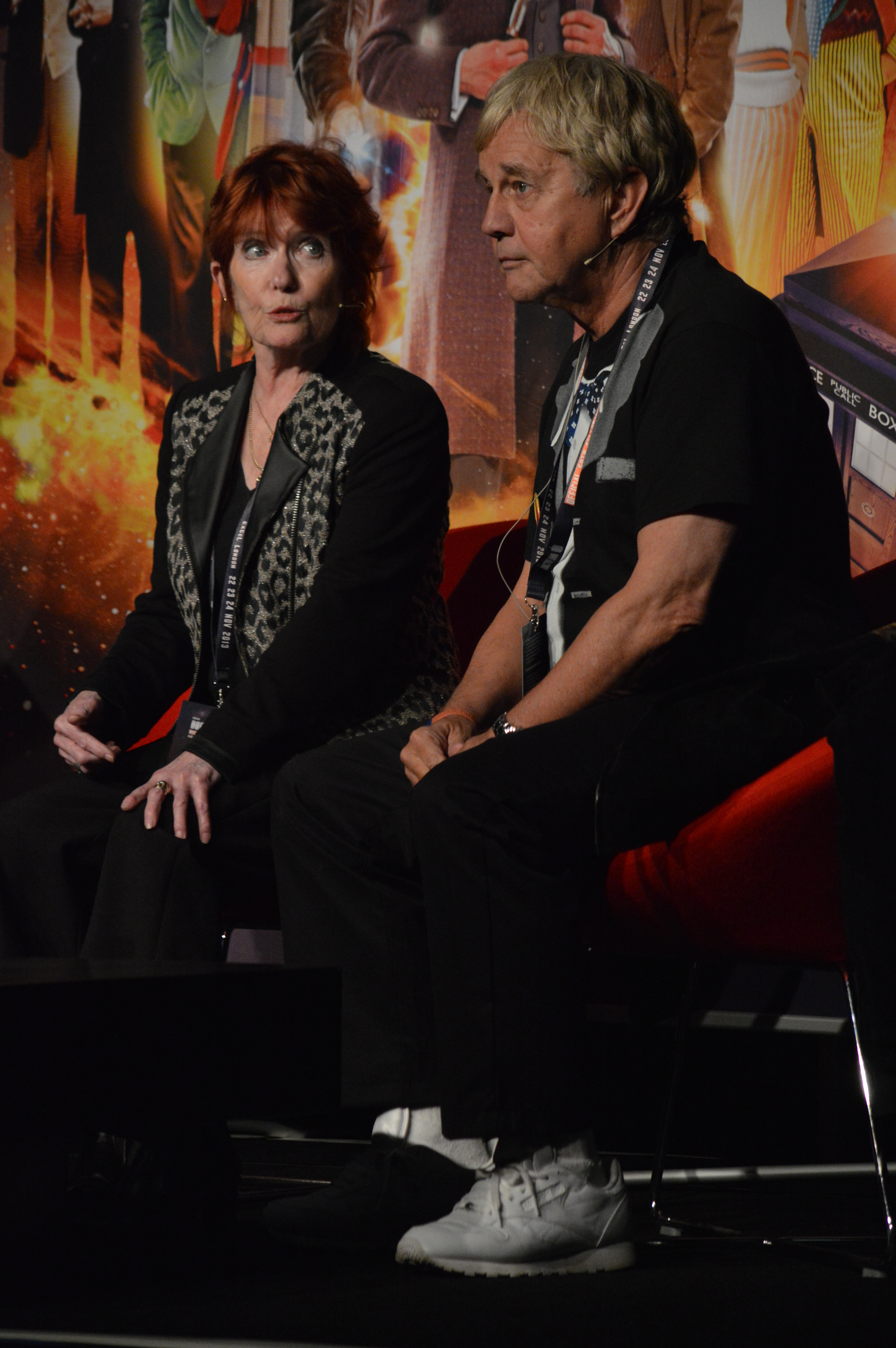
Watling and Frazer Hines at a Doctor Who event in 2013

=== Film ===
Year	Film	Role	Notes
1973	That'll Be the Day	Sandra	
1973	Take Me High	Sarah Jones	
1977	Where Time Began	Glauben	Voice; English version
1995	Downtime	Victoria Waterfield	Direct-to-video
2000	Out of Site	Mrs Pearson	
2001	Possessions	Lady Winkworth	

=== Television ===
Year	Title	Role	Notes
1958–1959	The Invisible Man	Sally Wilson	11 episodes
1959	The Adventures of William Tell	First Child	Episode: "The Spider"
1960	A Life of Bliss	Carol Fellows	6 episodes
1965	The Wednesday Play	Alice Liddell	Episode: "Alice"
1966	The Wednesday Play	Gretchen Westermann	Episode: "Calf Love"
1966	The Power Game	Jennifer	Episode: "Late Via Rome"
1966	This Man Craig	Clare Maitland	Episode: "Period of Adjustment"
1966	Out of the Unknown	Sarah Richards	Episode: "The World in Silence"
1966	Horizon	Sophy	Episode: "Hand Me My Sword, Humphrey"
1967	No Hiding Place	Valerie Forbes	Episode: "A Girl Like You"
1967–1968	Doctor Who	Victoria Waterfield	40 episodes
1969	The Newcomers	Julie Robertson	26 episodes
1971	Crime of Passion	Leonie Juhan	Episode: "Magdalena"
1972	ITV Sunday Night Drama	Nurse Beverly	Episode: "Old Newsome"
1972	Doctor in Charge	Emma Livingstone	2 episodes
1973	Late Night Theatre	Annabelle Walsh	Episode: "Death to the General"
1973	Late Night Theatre	Jane	Episode: "The Gypsy's Revenge"
1973	Arthur of the Britons	Thuna	Episode: "The Slaves"
1977	A Roof Over My Head	Maureen	Episode: "A Roof Over My Head"
1978	Rising Damp	Lorna	Episode: "Hello Young Lovers"
1978	Lillie	Georgie Reed	Episode: "Sunset and Evening Star"
1979	Danger UXB	Norma Baker	7 episodes
1979	Accident	Miriam Saxon	Episode: "Ends and Ways"
1981	The Jim Davidson Show	Various	5 episodes
1993	Doctor Who: Dimensions in Time	Victoria Waterfield	TV short (Part Two)
2013	The Five(ish) Doctors Reboot	Deborah Watling	TV film

=== Audio dramas ===
Year	Title	Role	Ref.
2005	Doctor Who: Three's a Crowd	Auntie	
2008	Doctor Who: The Great Space Elevator	Victoria Waterfield	
2010	Doctor Who: The Emperor of Eternity	Victoria Waterfield	
2012	Doctor Who: Power Play	Victoria Waterfield	
2015	Doctor Who: The Black Hole	Victoria Waterfield	
2016	Doctor Who: The Second Doctor Volume One	Victoria Waterfield	
