= Victor Pemberton =

British writer and producer

- Born: Victor Francis Pemberton; 10 October 1931; Islington, London, England
- Died: 13 August 2017 (aged 85)
- Occupations: Producer, writer
- Partner: David Spenser (1931–2013; Spenser's death)

Victor Francis Pemberton (10 October 1931 – 13 August 2017) was a British writer and television producer. His scriptwriting work included BBC radio plays, and television scripts for the BBC and ITV, including Doctor Who, The Slide, Timeslip, Tightrope and The Adventures of Black Beauty. His television production work included the British version of Fraggle Rock (second series onwards), and several independent documentaries including the 1989 International Emmy Award-winning Gwen: A Juliet Remembered, about stage actress Gwen Ffrangcon-Davies.

== Early life ==
Pemberton grew up in Islington, London, and lived for many years in Essex. In his earlier years, Pemberton had several small screen acting roles. In addition to novelisations, he wrote many nostalgic novels set in London, prompted by the success of his autobiographical radio drama series Our Family.

== Doctor Who ==
Pemberton first worked on the programme in 1967 as assistant script editor and was promoted to the role of script editor during the production of the story The Tomb of the Cybermen.

Pemberton wrote the 1968 Patrick Troughton story Fury from the Deep (which he subsequently novelised for Target Books). The story, now missing from the BBC archives, was based on an earlier stand-alone radio serial he had written called The Slide, starring future actor Roger Delgado who would later star in Doctor Who as the Master. The story marks the first time the Doctor uses his trademark sonic screwdriver.

In 1976, Pemberton wrote the audio drama Doctor Who and the Pescatons for an experiment in Doctor Who on vinyl record and an early spin-off from the programme. The production was aimed at children and is heavily based on ideas Pemberton had used for Fury from the Deep. He later novelised The Pescatons, which was the final Doctor Who book published with the Target logo on the spine. He had previously appeared as an actor in the series, in a non-speaking role as a scientist in the 1967 story The Moonbase.

== Personal life ==
In later life he lived in Spain, where he continued to write novels. Pemberton was the life partner of the British actor, producer and writer David Spenser.

== Death ==
Pemberton's death was announced on 13 August 2017. He was 85.

Preceded by Peter Bryant	Doctor Who Script Editor; 1967	Succeeded by Derrick Sherwin
