= Victoria Waterfield =

Fictional character from Doctor Who

- Doctor Who character
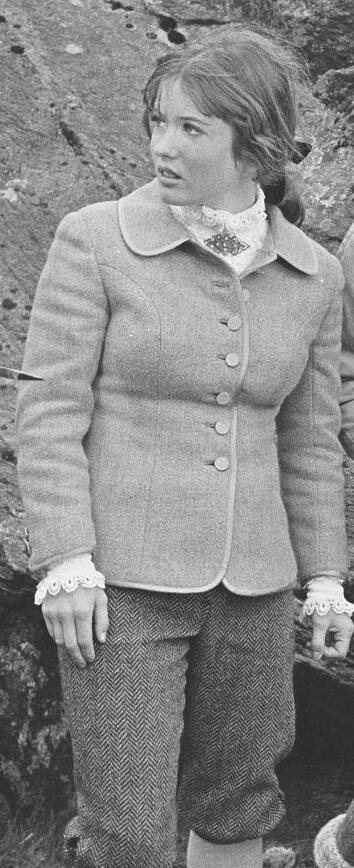
- Deborah Watling as Victoria Waterfield, as pictured during filming of The Abominable Snowmen (1967)
- First appearance: The Evil of the Daleks (1967)
- Last appearance: Fury from the Deep (1968)
- Portrayed by: Deborah Watling

In-universe information
- Species: Human
- Gender: Female
- Family: Edward Waterfield (father)
- Home era: 1866

Victoria Waterfield is a fictional character in the long-running British science fiction television series Doctor Who, played by Deborah Watling. Debuting in 1967's serial The Evil of the Daleks, she is a native of Victorian England. She was a companion of the Second Doctor throughout the show's fifth season, joining him after the death of her father at the hands of the Daleks. She was characterised as timid, and was known for screaming upon encountering monsters, though she also has moments where she is capable of facing danger; additionally, she is characterised as being inquisitive and observant. Victoria was written out of the series in the 1968 serial Fury from the Deep after the actress chose to leave at the end of her contract, though Watling would later reprise the role in various Doctor Who spin-off media.

Due to the departure of companions Ben and Polly from the series, the production team sought to fill the gap with another character. Though initially planning to use a character from the 1967 serial The Faceless Ones, those plans fell through, and the character of Victoria from the subsequent serial, The Evil of the Daleks, was selected to act as a companion instead. Watling was hired due to producer Innes Lloyd being impressed with her work as the titular character in the production Alice. Victoria as a character has been viewed as lacking agency compared to other characters in the series, with critics describing her as being passive and lacking in strong impact.

== Character history ==
Doctor Who is a long-running British science-fiction television series that began in 1963. It stars its protagonist, The Doctor, an alien who travels through time and space in a ship known as the TARDIS, as well as their travelling companions. When the Doctor dies, they are able to undergo a process known as "regeneration", completely changing the Doctor's appearance and personality. Throughout their travels, the Doctor often comes into conflict with various alien species and antagonists.

=== In the series ===
Victoria first appears in the 1967 serial The Evil of the Daleks. She is the daughter of widowed scientist Edward Waterfield (John Bailey), who in 1866 is experimenting with time travel and has attracted the attention of the Daleks. The Daleks take Victoria prisoner to ensure Waterfield's collaboration, and upon Waterfield's death, he asks the Second Doctor (Patrick Troughton) and Jamie McCrimmon (Frazer Hines) to take care of her. Victoria subsequently joins the pair in travelling in the TARDIS.

A teenager from England in the 1860s, Victoria is characterised as being timid, often relying on fellow companion Jamie McCrimmon to get out of tough scrapes. She has a "prim" personality due to her time period of origin, retaining a "demureness" throughout her appearances in the series. Despite being known for screaming when encountering monsters, Victoria is also characterised as being capable of facing danger and is also very inquisitive and observant. Victoria longs to settle down in one place, though she has nothing left for her at home and has become too acclimatized to travel with the Doctor to return to her home time. During her time on the TARDIS, she adopts a father-like bond with the Second Doctor and an almost sibling-like bond with Jamie.

Victoria subsequently appears in several serials, aiding the Doctor and Jamie in confronting several antagonists, including the Cybermen, the Yeti, and the Ice Warriors. Eventually, during the 1968 serial Fury from the Deep, she encounters a weed creature at an oil rig in the 20th century United Kingdom. Her high pitched screams overwhelm the creature and destroy it, but after its defeat, Victoria elects to stay behind in the 20th century, being adopted by a family who lived nearby.

Victoria appears in various novels, audio dramas, and comics for the series. Additionally, she appears in the 1995 spin-off film Downtime and the 1993 Children in Need special Dimensions in Time.

== Development ==
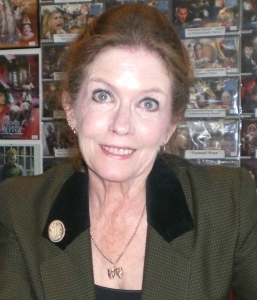
Deborah Watling as pictured in 2008

Victoria was introduced in the 1967 serial The Evil of the Daleks. She was named after both her time period of origin (Victorian England) and the name of script editor Gerry Davis's eldest daughter. Due to the departure of Ben and Polly (Michael Craze and Anneke Wills) as companions in the prior serial, 1967's The Faceless Ones, the production team sought a new companion to fill the gap left behind. Originally, the team had wanted to use the character of Samantha Briggs from the latter serial, though her actress, Pauline Collins, declined the offer of a recurring role. As a result, Victoria was used to fill the gap instead.

According to the short BBC Video documentary The Dalek Factor about the making of the story, released in September 2021 as part of the animated restoration of the serial, Denise Buckley was cast in the role of Victoria Waterfield by director Derek Martinus. Although hopeful Pauline Collins would continue in the role of Samantha Briggs, that she had played in the previous story The Faceless Ones, he production team had created Victoria as a back-up should Collins decline. When Collins confirmed she did not want to join the regular cast, it was decided to introduce Victoria as the new companion and Denise Buckley who had been cast in the role for that story was released, but paid in full, with Deborah Watling replacing her as a more suitable actress for the ongoing role.

Watling had come to the attention of Doctor Who producer Innes Lloyd after she starred in the title role in Alice. Though she previously was considered for the role of previous companion Polly, she was considered too inexperienced at the time of her audition and was passed over in favor of Anneke Wills. According to the book Doctor Who: Who-ology, she was later recalled to audition for the role of Victoria; The Complete History stated, however, that Watling did not formally audition, but instead discussed the part with Lloyd and got the part soon after, with Lloyd remembering her performance in Alice.

Victoria was conceived of as a young, naïve girl with a tragic backstory, with the Second Doctor taking on a paternalistic relationship as he takes her under his wing. The character of Victoria fell into the pre-existing archetype of a young girl who would serve a role similar to that of the Doctor's granddaughter, Susan Foreman (Carole Ann Ford), with the Doctor often treating Victoria in a similar manner.

Despite Victoria's characterisation, Watling attempted to give the character further strength, stating that she "tried to instill something of a tomboy in her". Victoria's screaming would earn Watling the nickname of "Leatherlungs" from her co-stars, whom she enjoyed a warm relationship with. Watling eventually decided to leave the role toward the end of her initial contract, seeking to return to theatre. In a later interview, she explained that she also departed as a result of scripts not giving the character of Victoria much development. She gave the production team three months' notice, and she was written out in the 1968 serial Fury from the Deep. Watling's departure necessitated further script rewrites as the production team had already planned for Victoria to feature in five further storylines, and the search for a new actress to play the next companion began soon after. Wendy Padbury would soon be cast as the next companion, Zoe Heriot.

Watling was offered the choice to return in 1983's "The Five Doctors", though she declined to in order to work on another programme. Victoria was also planned to re-appear in the planned serial Meltdown for the show's twenty-third season. The story would have seen Victoria now campaigning in the modern day against nuclear waste, though this ended up being scrapped during production. Years later, Watling would reprise her role in several further productions for the series, including in a number of audio dramas produced by Big Finish Productions.

== Reception ==
Despite her short period of time on the show, Victoria made an impact as a character, being particularly remembered for her screaming when she encountered monsters. The Daily Telegraph's Ben Lawrence described her as lacking in strong agency as a companion, being a character that played a secondary role to the male characters on-screen at the time; however, he did highlight Watling's performance as giving the character an "infectious charm". Literary critic John Kenneth Muir characterised Victoria as being a "screaming, helpless thing".

The book Doctor Who: A British Alien regarded Victoria as being a symbol of "traditional femininity and passivity", noting how she had little individual agency as a character and that she had little impact on the series as a whole. The book Women in Doctor Who: Damsels, Feminists and Monsters stated that Victoria characterised the "screaming companion" trope, a trope which gives women little agency in favor of having them scream at visible threats. The book also noted that her character was sexualised within the show via her tendency to wear miniskirts, which was a trait that was, according to Watling, given to appeal to an older male audience; within the show itself, the Doctor brushed her aside when she expressed concern over her skirt's length, while Jamie also sexualised her at times within the show's narrative.
