= The Power of Three (Doctor Who) =

229 – "The Power of Three"
- Doctor Who episode
- Promotional poster

Cast
- Doctor: Matt Smith – Eleventh Doctor
- Companions: Karen Gillan – Amy Pond; Arthur Darvill – Rory Williams
- Others: Mark Williams – Brian Williams; Steven Berkoff – Shakri; Stephen Blything – Henry; Jemma Redgrave – Kate Stewart; Selva Rasalingham – Ranjit; Alice O'Connell – Laura; Alan Sugar – Himself (uncredited); Brian Cox – Himself (uncredited)

Production
- Directed by: Douglas Mackinnon
- Written by: Chris Chibnall
- Produced by: Marcus Wilson
- Executive producers: Steven Moffat; Caroline Skinner
- Music by: Murray Gold
- Series: Series 7
- Running time: 41 minutes
- First broadcast: 22 September 2012

Chronology
← Preceded by "A Town Called Mercy"	Followed by → "The Angels Take Manhattan"

"The Power of Three" is the fourth episode of the seventh series of the British science fiction television programme Doctor Who that aired on BBC One and BBC One HD on 22 September 2012. It was written by Chris Chibnall and directed by Douglas Mackinnon.

In this episode, alien time traveller the Doctor (Matt Smith) spends time on Earth with his travelling companions Amy Pond (Karen Gillan) and her husband Rory (Arthur Darvill) while he awaits activity from millions of small cubes that appeared overnight.

"The Power of Three" focused on Amy and Rory's point of view and the impact of the Doctor's influence on their lives, as they would be leaving in the next episode. The story was inspired by The Man Who Came to Dinner and the story of the MSC Napoli. The episode also saw the return of UNIT and introduced their new scientific advisor, Kate Stewart (Jemma Redgrave), daughter of Brigadier Lethbridge-Stewart. The episode featured brief cameo appearances by Lord Sugar and professor Brian Cox. Despite being the penultimate episode in the first block of the series, "The Power of Three" was the last to be filmed, and was thus the last episode for Gillan and Darvill.

The episode was watched by 7.67 million viewers in the UK. Critical reception to the episode was generally positive, highlighting the emotion and humour, although many critics derided the solution to the plot.

== Plot ==
Amy and Rory adjust to normal life without travelling with the Eleventh Doctor. One day, billions of small black cubes appear across the globe. The Doctor arrives and he, Amy and Rory are taken to UNIT headquarters, where UNIT's head, Kate Stewart, explains that they have not been able to analyse the cubes' function. The Doctor waits with Amy and Rory for several days to monitor the situation, and gets to know Rory's father, Brian. The Doctor deems the cubes harmless and departs, but instructs Brian to keep watch.

A year passes, with Amy and Rory periodically travelling with the Doctor. Brian, after observing Amy and Rory returning from one trip, asks the Doctor what has happened to his past companions. The Doctor tells some had met a sad fate but he will not let that happen to Amy or Rory. Humanity forgets about the cubes, using them as paperweights or other functions.

A year after their arrival, the cubes start to activate, scanning information networks and act in self-defence. The Doctor fears this was a "slow invasion", and goes with Amy to UNIT while Rory and Brian help at the hospital. All the cubes are now showing the same countdown timer. When they reach zero, the cubes open, but appear empty; however, massive numbers of cardiac arrest cases are reported, killing about a third of humanity. Kate finds the boxes emitted a signal traced to seven sites across the globe, including the hospital Rory works at.

At the hospital, Brian has been taken to a service lift by two orderlies. Rory follows them and discovers the back of it masks a portal to a ship in Earth's orbit. The Doctor and Amy arrive, discover the portal, and join Rory as he frees Brian. The Doctor is confronted by a hologram of a Shakri, who, according to Gallifreyan legend, were self-appointed "pest controllers" in the universe. The Shakri released the cubes to Earth to wipe out humanity and prepare to send out more, but the Doctor reverses the cubes' function, sending a signal that brings those harmed back to life. Feedback from this causes the ship to explode, though the four escape safely.

As Earth recovers, the Doctor prepares to leave alone, but Brian insists he take Amy and Rory on a once-in-a-lifetime adventure, asking "just bring them back safe".

=== Continuity ===
The Doctor tells Brian that a few of his previous companions have died; this is a reference to Sara Kingdom, Katarina, and Adric. At one point, the Doctor, Amy, and Rory relax and eat fish fingers and custard, a reference to "The Eleventh Hour". Amy and Rory's meal at the newly opened Savoy hotel is ruined by "a Zygon spaceship parked under the Savoy"; the Zygons previously featured in the Fourth Doctor serial Terror of the Zygons (1975) and would appear again in the 50th anniversary special "The Day of the Doctor" (2013). The Tower of London had previously served as a UNIT base in "The Christmas Invasion" and was mentioned as such in "The Sontaran Stratagem". The Doctor also mentions having a metallic dog that could hover; this refers to K9, the robotic dog of the Fourth Doctor.

== Production ==
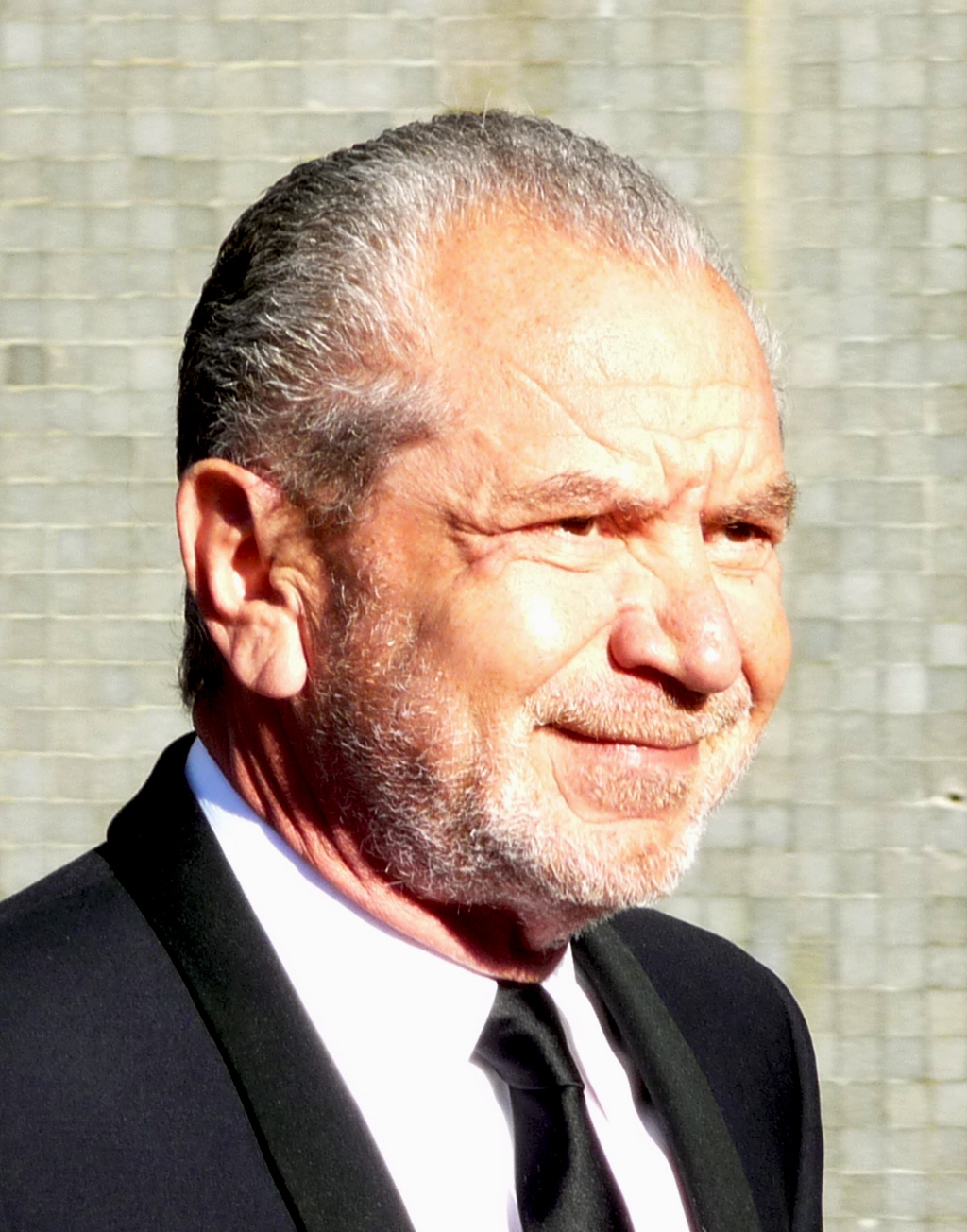
The episode featured a cameo by Lord Sugar, filmed on the set of his show The Apprentice.

The episode's title was originally reported as "Cubed", but was later announced as "The Power of Three". Chris Chibnall had previously written the Doctor Who episodes "42" (2007), "The Hungry Earth"/"Cold Blood" (2010), and the second episode of the seventh series, "Dinosaurs on a Spaceship". He was also a major contributor to the spinoff series Torchwood. Chibnall described "The Power of Three" as "a lovely big Earth invasion story" but different from the ones done before, as it focused on Amy and Rory's time with the Doctor and the impact of him on their lives. He stated it is told more from Amy and Rory's point of view than ever before, and is about celebrating them before they leave in the following episode. Chibnall's brief from showrunner Steven Moffat was to "live with the Doctor — The Man Who Came to Dinner, Doctor Who style." Chibnall was also inspired by the story of the MSC Napoli. Matt Smith put disgust into the Doctor's remark concerning Twitter in the episode, reflecting his real-life decision to stay off the social network.

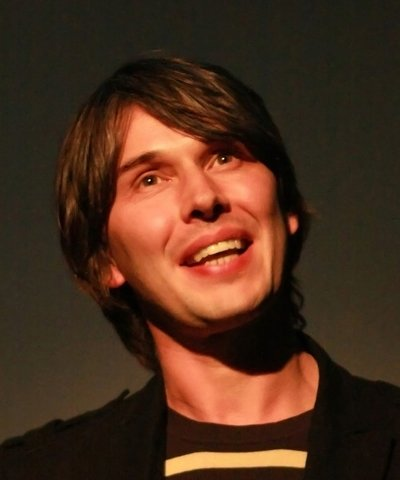
Physicist Brian Cox also made a cameo appearance, theorising on the origin of the cubes.

At Chibnall's request, "The Power of Three" sees the return of UNIT, which first appeared in The Invasion (1968) and became a regular feature during the Third Doctor (Jon Pertwee) era. The episode reveals that Kate Stewart is now running UNIT; she is the daughter of Brigadier Lethbridge-Stewart and previously appeared in the Reeltime Pictures direct-to-video films Downtime and Dæmos Rising played by Beverley Cressman. Following the death of actor Nicholas Courtney in early 2011, the Doctor learned of the Brigadier's death in the sixth series finale "The Wedding of River Song". Matt Smith enjoyed working with Jemma Redgrave, describing her as "graceful, funny and charming and an absolute delight".

The read-through of "The Power of Three" took place at Roath Lock, Cardiff on 27 April 2012. It was filmed by itself in the series' third production block. Because of this schedule, it was the final episode Karen Gillan and Arthur Darvill filmed as Amy and Rory. Their last scene filmed together was getting into the TARDIS with the Doctor after saying farewell to Brian; when the doors closed Gillan, Darvill, and Smith hugged and started crying. Some exterior scenes at Amy and Rory's house were re-shot in June and July 2012, with Darvill briefly returning for the June re-shoot. Producer Marcus Wilson stated that a "hundred" individual cube props were made, with "many more" added with computer-generated imagery (CGI). Amy and the Doctor's conversation outside the Tower of London could not be filmed at the genuine location due to the London Olympics, so it was shot on studio in Cardiff and the live action was combined with other footage to create the illusion. The episode also features cameos from physicist Brian Cox and Lord Sugar, both of whom were long-time fans of the program. Sugar's cameo was in fact filmed on the set of The Apprentice, with director Douglas Mackinnon standing in for the person who was fired.

== Broadcast and reception ==
"The Power of Three" was first broadcast in the United Kingdom on BBC One and BBC One HD on 22 September 2012. Overnight ratings showed that it was watched by an audience of 5.49 million live. The final consolidated rating rose to 7.67 million viewers, making it the thirteenth most-watched programme of the week on British television, and the fifth highest rated on BBC One. The episode also received 1.3 million requests on BBC's online iPlayer, placing it fourth for the month on the site behind the first three episodes of the series. It also received an Appreciation Index of 87, considered "excellent".

=== Critical reception ===
"The Power of Three" received generally positive reviews. Dan Martin of The Guardian stated he "bloody loved" the episode, calling it "a nostalgic run through all the best bits of the Russell T Davies era". However, he noted that it "also had the weaknesses of some of [Davies'] adventures – the ending was so underdeveloped that even a magic button couldn't explain it – but 'The Power of Three' was, in every sense, completely gorgeous". Neela Debnath, writing for The Independent, praised the way the episode showed the companion's life outside the TARDIS and celebrated Amy and Rory, as well as the introduction of Kate Stewart and her connection with the Brigadier.

Radio Times reviewer Patrick Mulkern described it as "beautifully made television" and welcomed Kate as a "wonderful addition". However, he stated that he did not "entirely buy the Doctor's solution". Keith Phipps of The A.V. Club graded the episode as a B+. Despite noting the plot was "fairly standard" and "easily foiled", he wrote that the concept of the cubes and "slow invasion" was "a cleverly executed bit of business". IGN's Matt Risley rated "The Power of Three" a score of 8 out of 10, writing that the first three quarters were "simply brilliant" because of the emotion and humour. However, he criticised the "rushed resolution" and the lack of explanation for the aliens at the hospital. Digital Spy reviewer Morgan Jeffery gave the episode four out of five stars, describing it as "an emotional, fun and involving Doctor Who episode" despite the disappointing resolution.

Russell Lewin of SFX gave the episode three and a half out of five stars, naming it as Chibnall's best Doctor Who episode. While he noted that "the ending was potentially always going to be a let down...And it is", there was "much to enjoy beforehand" such as UNIT and the humour. The Daily Telegraph reviewer Gavin Fuller gave it a score of two and a half out of five stars, feeling that it was "treading water" as a lead-in to the following finale. He described the first twenty minutes as "overpadded" and "heavy on exposition but little else", and pointed out the unexplained action at Rory's hospital. However, he enjoyed Amy and the Doctor's conversation and the "countdown element and the mystery of the cubes", but found the explanation unoriginal and the conclusion too easy. Adam James Cuthbert of Cultfix described the episode as "heavily flawed in various aspects of its storytelling techniques". Cuthbert also criticises the Shakri as villains, noting that their hostility and plans are never fully explained. He also questions the Doctor and his allies leaving the comatose hospitial patients in place on their plinths as the ship explodes, believing it to be "out of character".
