= Mindgame (Doctor Who) =

The Mindgame series is a series of direct-to-video spin-off productions based on the long running BBC science fiction series Doctor Who. The two films in the series are Mindgame (1998) and Mindgame Trilogy (1999). They were produced by the independent Reeltime Pictures company. All films have been reissued on DVD.

All story elements relating to Doctor Who were licensed from their respective authors.

== Overview ==
Mindgame tells the story of a human, a Sontaran and a Draconian trapped together in a prison cell and Mindgame Trilogy continues their story after they escaped. Mindgame is written by Terrance Dicks. The Mindgame Trilogy is separated into three little stories: Battlefield is written Terrance Dicks while Prisoner 451 is written by Miles Richardson and Scout Ship by Roger Stevens. The stories are directed by Keith Barnfather. The stories were released as Region 2 and 4 DVDs. They were also released on video in PAL and NTSC by Reeltime Pictures. While Sophie Aldred plays the human and Miles Richardson the Draconian in all the stories, the Sontaran is played by different actors. Toby Aspin plays the Sontaran in Mindgame and John Wadmore in the Mindgame Trilogy.

== Mindgame ==
Mindgame
- Directed by: Keith Barnfather
- Written by: Terrance Dicks
- Produced by: Keith Barnfather
- Starring: Bryan Robson; Sophie Aldred; Toby Aspin; Miles Richardson
- Edited by: Brian Comley
- Production company: Reeltime Pictures
- Release date: 1998
- Running time: 30 minutes

=== Story ===
A human, a Sontaran, and a Draconian trapped together in a prison cell. Another alien has trapped them there to find out about their strengths and weaknesses. The alien wants them to fight against each other. However, the Sontaran, Draconian and human work together and the alien is killed by the human. The Sontaran, Draconian and human return to the place where they have been before they were kidnapped.

=== Critical reception ===
Paul Clarke calls the drama "a short but sweet character drama that is clearly Doctor Who on the sly". Stuart Gutteridge from Pagefillers describes Mindgame as a "rushed piece of work" with a very simple plot. According to him it has a predictable ending but is nothing less than entertaining. Reuben Herfindahl thinks that Mindgame is the worst professional Doctor Who related video he has ever seen. The only positive thing about this video is the acting of Sophie Aldred and Miles Richardson. The writing is bad. Richard Radcliffe adds that he found the characters ordinary and predictable. Kathy Sullivan thinks that the characters are "over relying on stereotypes". According to her it is a "good short story with nicely-done costumes and special effects".

== Mindgame Trilogy ==
Mindgame Trilogy
- Directed by: Keith Barnfather
- Written by: Terrance Dicks; Miles Richardson; Roger Stevens
- Produced by: Keith Barnfather
- Starring: Sophie Aldred; Miles Richardson; John Wadmore
- Edited by: Robin Lee
- Music by: Nicholas Briggs
- Production company: Reeltime Pictures
- Release date: 1998
- Running time: 30 minutes

=== Story ===
==== Battlefield (Terrance Dicks) ====
Field-Major Sarg is wounded and dying on a battle-scarred planet unless the Sontarans come back for him. He thinks about his previous experiences with the human and the Draconian. He believes that Sontarans and other species might work together, but is not this unthinkable for a Sontaran. Sarg's commander arrives and hears Sarg's thoughts on Sontarans and other species working together. The commander executes Sarg for treason.

==== Prisoner 451 (Miles Richardson) ====
The Draconian is in the prison and going to face certain death. He thinks about his previous experiences and finally his crime is revealed. He fell in love with the complete works of William Shakespeare.

==== Scout Ship (Roger Stevens) ====
The human pilot is going to die soon, her spaceship is broken. The only thing that is working is the onboard camera. She captures her last moments on the spaceship on camera before killing herself.

=== Critical reception ===
Richard Radcliffe from Pagefillers thought that the segment with the human was predictable. He believed that the Sontaran segment was the best and that the actor was a lot better than the actor who acted the Sontaran in Mindgame. He also thought that the set, the SFX and Terrance Dicks writing were impressive. Stuart Gutteridge added that the location and the CGI effects added an atmosphere to the proceedings in the Sontaran story. According to him the segment with the human was the most emotional of the three. Kathy Sullivan recommended the film. She believed that the trilogy was much darker and gave the actors an opportunity for powerful performances, but it also left her rather depressed by the end. Paul Clarke called the film a "modestly impressive trilogy". The Sontaran segment was an "enjoyable study in Sontaran psychology, even if there is not really the time for it to be anything more than the simplistic". Furthermore, he thought that the special effects were remarkably effective.

== Novelisation ==
Mindgame
- Author: David J. Howe
- Cover artist: Andrew-Mark Thompson
- Publisher: Telos Publishing
- Publication date: August 2020
- Pages: 138
- ISBN: 978-1-84583-986-4

A novelisation of these films by David J. Howe was published August 2020 by Telos Publishing.
