= Yeti (Doctor Who) =

Fictional robots from Doctor Who

- Doctor Who race
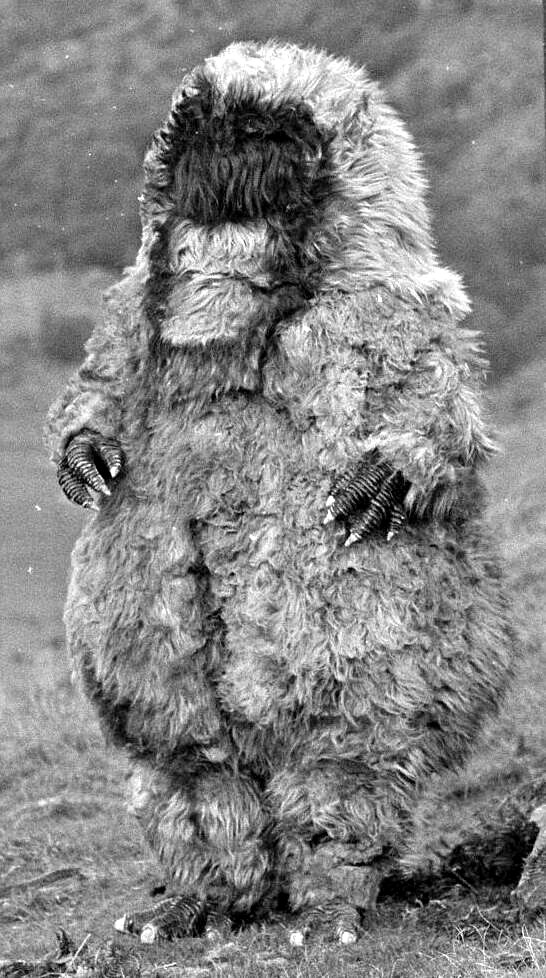
- A Yeti as pictured during the filming of The Abominable Snowmen (1967)
- First appearance: The Abominable Snowmen (1967)

In-universe information
- Home world: Earth
- Type: Robots
- Affiliation: The Great Intelligence

The Yeti are fictional robots from the long-running British science fiction television series Doctor Who. They were originally created by writers Henry Lincoln and Mervyn Haisman and first appeared in the 1967 serial The Abominable Snowmen. The Yeti resemble the cryptozoological creatures also called the Yeti. In the series' fictional universe, these robot Yeti serve the Great Intelligence, a formless entity with mysterious origins, and are used by the Intelligence to aid in its invasions. Following this debut appearance, the Yeti only had one other major appearance: in the 1968 serial The Web of Fear, which depicted the Yeti being used by the Intelligence in its attempt to subjugate London using the London Underground.

The concept of the Yeti arose as a result of a discussion between then-lead actor Patrick Troughton, Lincoln, and Haisman, and soon was pitched to the show's production office. The serial, The Abominable Snowmen, was chosen out of a desire for more on-location shooting, necessitated by the serial's script; it was also chosen because the production team needed a replacement for the Daleks, another popular antagonist that had recently been written out of the series. Producer Peter Bryant, predicting the Yeti would be a success with audiences, commissioned another serial featuring the Yeti to follow shortly after their debut. Disagreements arose between Lincoln and Haisman with the BBC in 1968 over the company's handling of another of the pair's creations for the series, leading to the writers' departure from the series and the retirement of the Yeti as antagonists in the main series apart from small cameos. The Yeti have recurred in spin-off media, including the 1995 direct-to-video film Downtime.

Already popular monsters at the time of their introduction, the Yeti became even more popular with their second appearance in The Web of Fear, as the Yeti's presence in the serial's setting of the London Underground was stated to have made them substantially more terrifying for viewers, especially children. Though the Yeti have maintained an appeal with fans after their retirement from the series, critics and some fans have felt that the creatures' inflexible costumes and "cuddly" appearance lessened their credibility as antagonists.

== History ==
Doctor Who is a long-running British science-fiction television series that began in 1963. Its protagonist, The Doctor, is an alien who travels through time and space in a ship known as the TARDIS, as well as their travelling companions. When the Doctor dies, they are able to undergo a process known as "regeneration", completely changing the Doctor's appearance and personality. Throughout their travels, the Doctor often comes into conflict with various alien species and antagonists.

The Yeti appear twice in the fifth season of Doctor Who as adversaries of the Doctor's second incarnation (Patrick Troughton). They are introduced in the 1967 serial The Abominable Snowmen guarding a cave near a Buddhist monastery in the Himalayas, scaring or killing travellers. The Yeti robots are protecting a pyramid of spheres that house the Great Intelligence, a disembodied entity with mysterious origins, who has possessed the body of the High Lama Padmasamabhava (Wolfe Morris) after the Intelligence encountered the High Lama on the astral plane several centuries ago. Using Padmasambhava, the Great Intelligence moves small Yeti game pieces around a chess-like map of the monastery and mountainside and the Yeti are controlled remotely via the "control spheres" in their chests. The Great Intelligence intends to create a physical body for itself, but these plans are foiled by the Doctor and his companions. With the Intelligence banished back to the astral plane, the Yeti fall dormant. Several Yeti are taken back to England by Professor Travers (Jack Watling), who had come on the mission in the hopes of encountering the real Yeti.

In The Web of Fear, which aired in 1968 and was set forty years after The Abominable Snowmen, the Yeti artifacts that Travers brought to England reawaken due to the return of the Great Intelligence. The Yeti then subjugate London and engulf the Underground in a web-like fungus. The only resistance offered is by a band of soldiers, led first by Captain Knight (Ralph Watson) and then by a colonel named Lethbridge-Stewart (Nicholas Courtney), with scientific support provided by Travers, his daughter Anne Travers (Tina Packer) and later the Doctor. The invasion of the London Underground is revealed as a trap designed to draw in the Doctor so that the Great Intelligence can drain the Doctor's mind, but the Intelligence is again defeated and banished, rendering all the Yeti dormant once again. The Yeti subsequently made a brief cameo in the 1969 serial The War Games, where they are referenced as one of the many antagonists that the Second Doctor had fought and defeated.

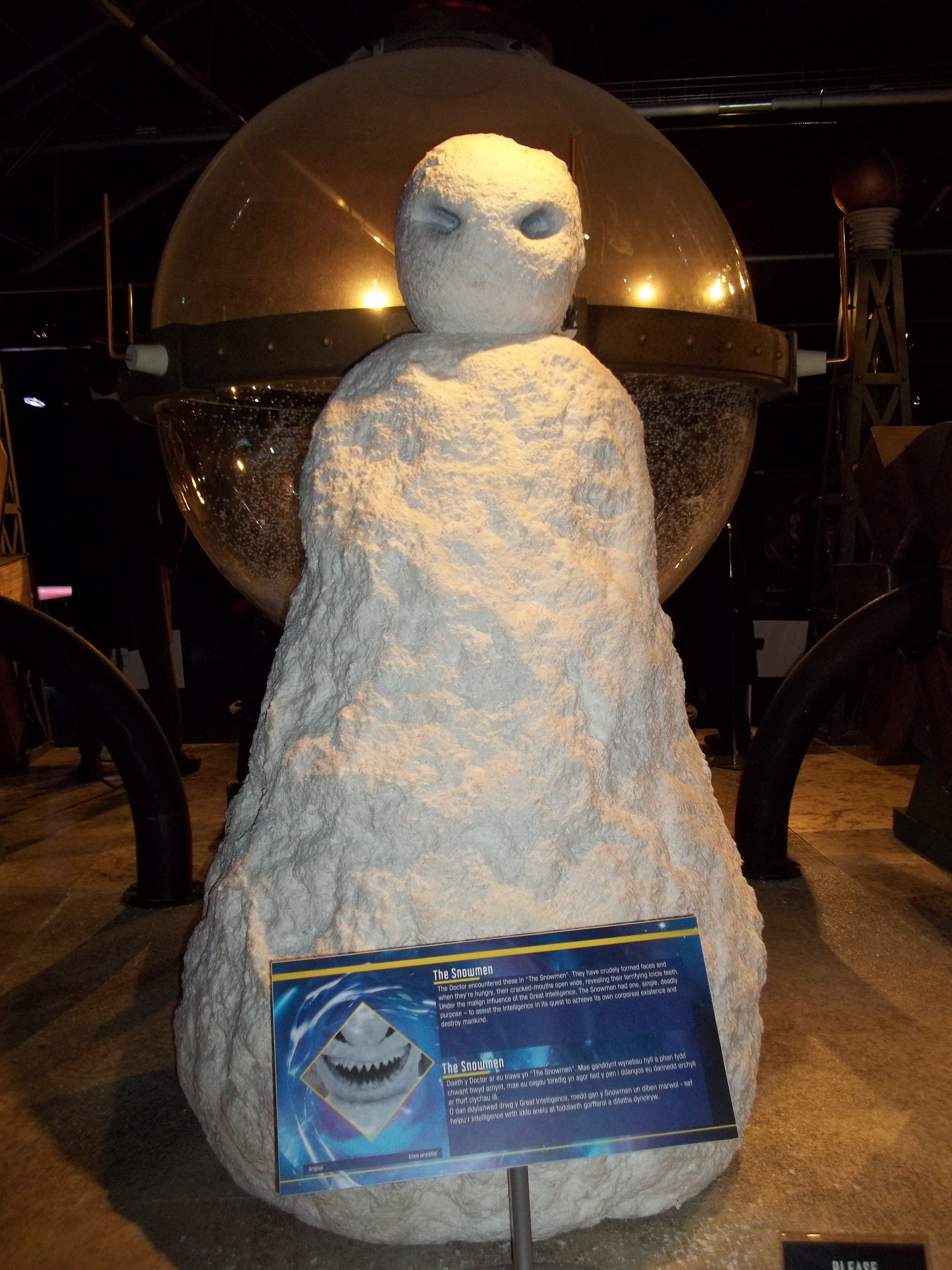
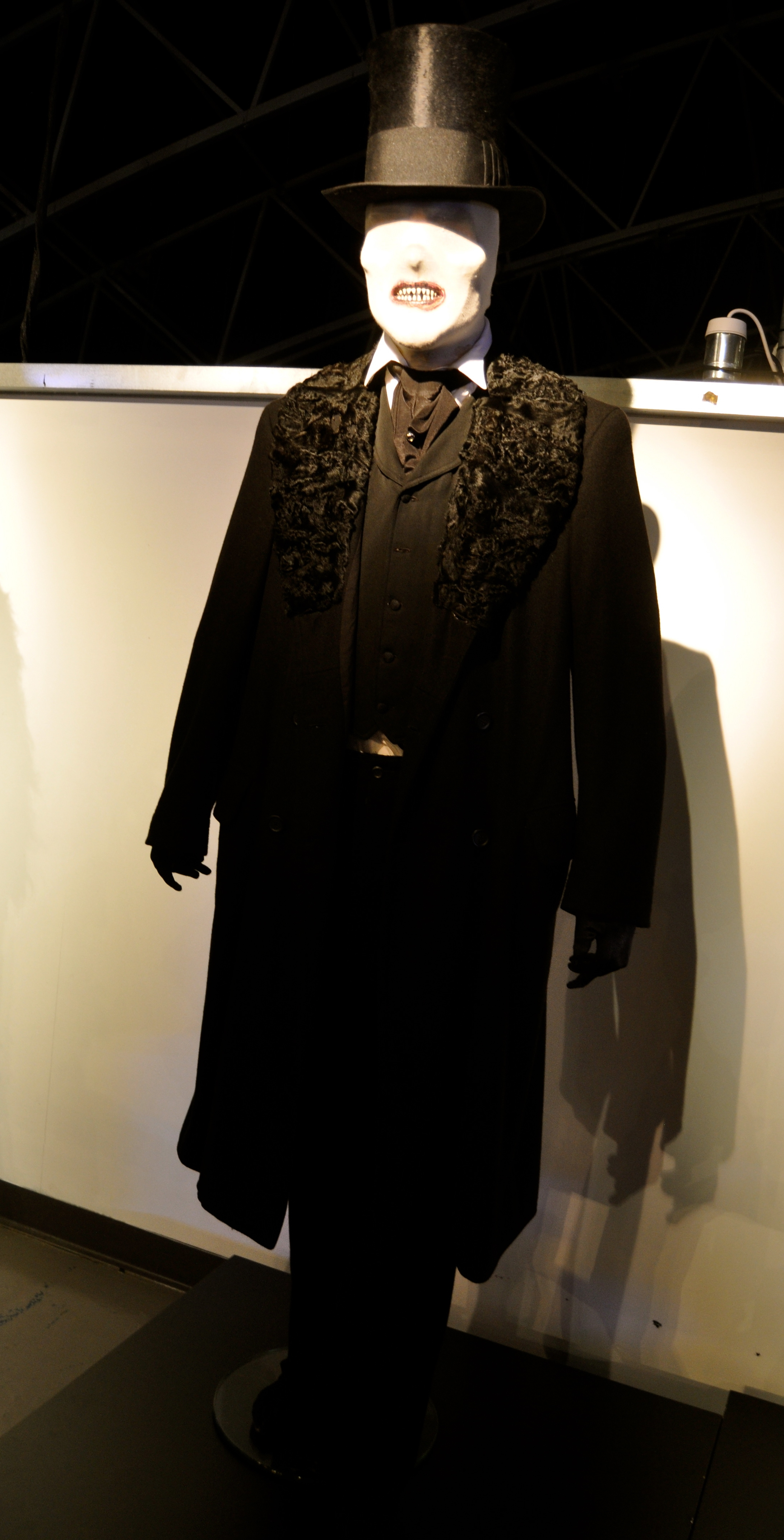
A Snowman (left) and a Whisper Man (right), who were some of the creatures that acted as the Intelligence's servants in place of the Yeti in the series' revival

A Yeti is one of the creatures featured in the 1983 episode "The Five Doctors" where it is encountered by the Second Doctor and Lethbridge-Stewart, who is now a Brigadier, as they cross through the Death Zone, an ancient arena used by the Time Lords, the Doctor's species, to pit aliens from across time and space against each other. The Yeti is one of the aliens that is present in the Death Zone, stated to be a leftover from a prior game. It attacks the pair, but the Doctor is able to use fireworks to cause a rockfall, separating them from the Yeti.

Though the Great Intelligence would return to the seventh series of Doctor Who's 2005 revival, the Yeti did not return. The Intelligence created several new servants, including the Snowmen, Spoonheads, and Whisper Men. These creatures diverged significantly from the Yeti: the Snowmen were sentient snowmen, the Spoonheads were robots that harvested human minds using the Wi-Fi, and the Whisper Men were faceless humanoids in Victorian fashion that whisper dark nursery rhymes under their breath.

=== Spin-off media ===
Yeti and the Great Intelligence are featured in the 1995 spin-off direct-to-video film Downtime, produced by Reeltime and featuring Victoria Waterfield (Deborah Watling), Brigadier Lethbridge-Stewart (Nicholas Courtney) and Sarah Jane Smith (Elisabeth Sladen) with a now deceased Professor Travers (Jack Watling) serving as a vessel for the Intelligence. The Yeti are once again used as the Intelligence's minions, and the Intelligence is able to use control spheres to turn humans into Yeti.

The Yeti appear as antagonists in several novels in the Lethbridge-Stewart book series, depicting stories starring the Brigadier. The Yeti also appear in the 1995 novel Millennial Rites by Craig Hinton, where the Intelligence merges with an entity from another dimension, creating an altered London; the Intelligence constructs Yeti in this dimension to act as its servants. The Yeti appear in audio drama stories The Web of Time and Time of the Intelligence, again as the Intelligence's foot-soldiers.

== Conception and development ==
=== Creation ===
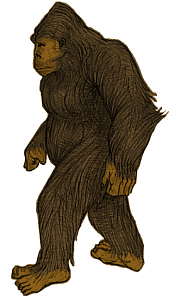
An artistic depiction of a yeti, on which Doctor Who's Yeti were based

The Yeti were created by writers Henry Lincoln and Mervyn Haisman. Lincoln had spoken with then-lead actor Patrick Troughton, who expressed disappointment in the lack of Earth-bound stories in his first season as the Doctor. Lincoln worked with Haisman to develop the concept, choosing the stories of the Yeti as a suitable concept around which to create a serial of the programme, as it was a creature viewers would be familiar with; it could also reasonably be adapted as the creature was never found, and thus was not proven to actually exist. Lincoln and Haisman brought up the idea with Troughton, who was interested and had wanted to be in a story with Yeti. Producer Innes Lloyd was interested in doing an episode set in the Himalayas and also saw the monsters as a potential replacement for the Daleks, which had recently been written out of the program. The Yeti, alongside other monsters such as the Cybermen and Ice Warriors, were one of many attempts by Lloyd to create such a replacement.

The Yeti's debut serial was commissioned for six episodes. Lincoln and Haisman, before they had started scripting, ironed out designs for the Yeti, including the original concept for the Yeti's control spheres. They wanted the Yeti to look cuddly and friendly so that their strength would come as a surprise to viewers. The pair quickly realised the Yeti would likely not be sentient, resulting in the creation of their in-universe master the Great Intelligence to act as their controller. Producer Peter Bryant, alongside the production team, predicted the serial would be popular, and thus commissioned a sequel episode featuring the Yeti three days before The Abominable Snowmen had even aired.

In 1968, disagreements arose between Lincoln and Haisman with the BBC over the serial The Dominators, as well as the BBC's subsequent usage of its antagonists, the Quarks, leading to the writers' departure from the series and the retirement of the Yeti as antagonists. This scrapped further plans for returns, which included a serial which would have written out the Second Doctor's companion Jamie McCrimmon. Despite this, a Yeti was able to briefly appear in The War Games in a cameo alongside several other monsters, done in part to commemorate the end of the Second Doctor's time on the show. An agreement with Lincoln and Haisman was able to be reached for the Yeti's appearance in "The Five Doctors", allowing the Yeti to replace the role of an unnamed subterranean monster from the original script.

Though the Great Intelligence was brought back as an antagonist in the seventh series of Doctor Who's 2005 revival, the Yeti were not brought back with it. The book Once Upon a Time Lord: The Myths and Stories of Doctor Who posited that this was likely due to the Yeti's being seen as too silly to be effective on a more modern television series. The book wrote that this lined up with then-showrunner Steven Moffat's comments on the also returning Ice Warriors, who Moffat was hesitant to bring back due to their slow, lumbering movement, which the Yeti also suffered from.

=== Design ===
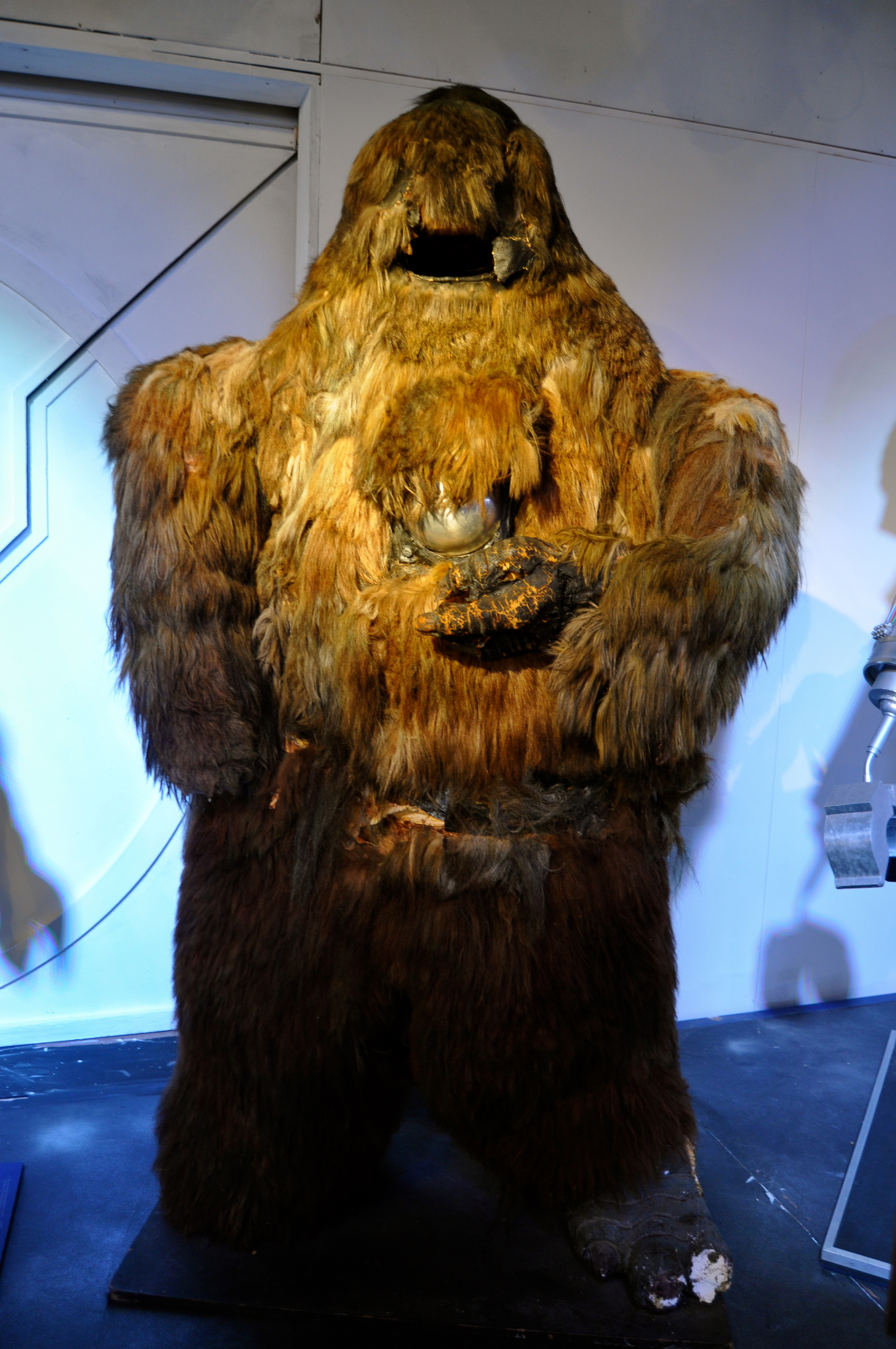
A Yeti costume from The Web of Fear, as seen on display at the Doctor Who Experience. The original Yeti design featured in The Abominable Snowmen was deemed to be too "cuddly", resulting in the Yeti's redesign for their second appearance.

The Yeti costumes were designed by Martin Baugh in both of their appearances. The original Yeti costume used latex hands and feet, and Cybermat props were reused for elements of the control spheres in the costume's chest. The costume's main body used a bamboo base and was largely one piece, with a second head piece placed on top of the main body. A small slit was available underneath the Yeti's "nose" to act as eyeholes for the actor. Four of these Yeti costumes were produced for the serial. A central box was placed in the costume's chest for the control sphere, which was largely covered by the costume's fur, which could be lifted as needed for shots requiring the control sphere. Actors had to dress lightly underneath the costumes to avoid overheating as it could get hot inside the costumes. Rainy weather on location made the Yeti costumes "flop" and thus appear more "cuddly" than originally portrayed. The slopes needed for the serial's location also became slippery, making filming hazardous for Yeti actors. Hairdryers were used to re-fluff the Yeti's costumes after they got too wet. A real Yeti, seen briefly at the end of the serial, re-used the original Yeti costume, and likewise was portrayed by an actor. This Yeti had much of the stuffing and framework removed to allow it to run away, as actors could not move quickly in fully formed Yeti costumes due to the costume's weight.

For their re-appearance in The Web of Fear, the original costumes had already started to deteriorate, and many had criticised the "cuddly" Yeti designs. As a result, the next design was made to be "rougher" and had glowing eyes. They used yak hair for their construction, were slightly smaller sized than the originals, and wielded "web guns" to attack, unlike before where they solely used their physical strength. They were constructed by freelance prop builders Jack and John Lowell. The team ran into problems with the Yeti as several action sequences could not be performed, such as a scene where a Yeti lifts and throws a soldier, due to how heavy the costumes were. Director Douglas Camfield grew to dislike the Yeti as he found them limiting in stories. An original Yeti costume from The Abominable Snowmen was used briefly in the serial as a display piece in a museum, and the old design was transitioned to the new design during the serial's events. As a result of the Yeti's popularity and the new design, prior to the airing of The Web of Fear, a special trailer featuring Patrick Troughton in character as the Second Doctor was shown, telling audiences to expect far scarier Yeti in the serial.

For "The Five Doctors", a re-used, flea-infested costume from The Web of Fear was used to depict the Yeti in the serial.

Brian Hodgson of the BBC Radiophonic Workshop developed a Yeti roar for the Yeti's second appearance, created by slowing down the sound of a flushing toilet. The control sphere sound effects were also done by Hodgson, and were used in both Yeti serials. The Yeti were portrayed by various actors across their two appearances.

== Reception and legacy ==
After the death of co-creator Mervyn Haisman, The Guardian's obituary called the Yeti his "lasting legacy" to the series and its fanbase, noting how the monsters "captured the public imagination". The book Who Is The Doctor 2: The Unofficial Guide to Doctor Who – The Modern Series noted that the Yeti were incredibly popular antagonists with those who watched the series, even after they stopped appearing in the series, with the book stating that "It's a testament to their effectiveness that they maintained an appeal for all this time." Ivan Phillips similarly wrote in the book Once Upon a Time Lord: The Myths and Stories of Doctor Who that the Yeti's redesign in The Web of Fear, in conjunction with their presence in the familiar London Underground environment, helped make the monsters more terrifying for children. Media historian James Chapman opined that the Yeti's presence was the start of Doctor Who's recurring motif of using science fiction to explain real-world mythology due to the creatures' being revealed as robot minions. Chapman reflects that their second appearance in The Web of Fear made the Yeti terrifying as a result of their presence in the familiar environment of the London Underground, with their presence being stated by Chapman to have made the Piccadilly line into as scary as "what Psycho had done for motel showers." Third Doctor actor Jon Pertwee is known for commenting that nothing frightened an audience more than "a Yeti on your loo in Tooting Bec", which he used to defend the successful format of stories set exclusively on Earth in the series. Writing in A Critical History of Doctor Who on Television, critic John Kenneth Muir stated that the concept of a "hairy beast" actually being a robot was so popular it inspired other similar creatures, such as a robotic sasquatch on the show The Six Million Dollar Man.

Graham Sleight, writing for the book The Doctor's Monsters: Meanings of the Monstrous in Doctor Who, commented that the voiceless Yeti robots, in addition to similar monsters such as the Autons and the maggots in The Green Death, are controlled by another entity and are merely there to provide a threat, leading to the Yeti and similar monsters being less interesting than monsters that could talk or reason with the characters. Simon Morgan-Russell, writing in the piece An Enemy Within: The London Underground and Doctor Who's "The Web of Fear", believed that the original Yeti designs featured in The Abominable Snowmen were the epitome of antagonists during the show's 1963–1989 original run, writing that they were "awkward, hulking monsters, slowed down by the weight or inflexibility of the actors' costumes". Morgan-Russell believed that while the Yeti were terrifying figures for children, the threat levelled in the Web of Fear for adults was said to be more of a result of the social and political climate of the time and how the serial tackled these issues. Writing in the book The Science of Doctor Who, writer Mark Brake criticised the Yeti's designs, believing their large, teddy bear-like design not only made the Yeti look "unconvincing", but also made the Intelligence less imposing as an antagonist. Phillips wrote that the rediscovery of The Web of Fear in 2013, a serial that had previously been missing, allowed for a re-evaluation of the Yeti as antagonists by fans and critics, leading to many viewing the Yeti less highly in retrospect due to the Yeti not being "quite as effective" in the modern day as they were popularly remembered. He added that the Intelligence's new servants, the Whisper Men, by comparison used similar elements to the Yeti, such as slow, shambling movement and a lack of ability to communicate, to a much more effective degree.
