= Downtime (Doctor Who) =

1995 Doctor Who spinoff film

- VHS Release cover

Cast
- Starring: Nicholas Courtney – Brigadier Lethbridge-Stewart; Elisabeth Sladen – Sarah Jane Smith; Deborah Watling – Victoria Waterfield; Jack Watling – Professor Travers; Beverley Cressman – Kate Lethbridge-Stewart

Production
- Directed by: Christopher Barry
- Written by: Marc Platt
- Produced by: Keith Barnfather; Ian Levine; Paul Cuthbert-Brown; Andrew Beech
- Music by: Ian Levine, Nigel Stock, and Erwin Keiles
- Running time: 1 episode, 70 mins.
- First broadcast: 2 September 1995 (release date)

Chronology
← Preceded by —	Followed by → Dæmos Rising

Downtime is a 1995 direct-to-video spin-off of the long-running British science fiction television series Doctor Who. It was produced by the independent production company Reeltime Pictures. It is a sequel to the Second Doctor serials The Abominable Snowmen (1967) and The Web of Fear (1968).

Downtime stars Nicholas Courtney, Deborah Watling, Jack Watling and Elisabeth Sladen reprising their roles as Brigadier Lethbridge-Stewart, Victoria Waterfield, Professor Edward Travers and Sarah Jane Smith, respectively. It introduces the character of Kate Lethbridge-Stewart.

The film received overall mixed reviews from critics, but was successful enough to get a sequel, Dæmos Rising, in 2004.

== Synopsis ==
Sometime after Victoria had parted company with the Doctor on 20th century Earth (Fury from the Deep), she is lured back to the Detsen Monastery in Tibet (The Abominable Snowmen) by a dream telling her she'll find her late father there. Instead, she finds the Great Intelligence, which still possessed the mind of Professor Travers (The Web of Fear).

15 years later, Victoria is the vice chancellor of New World University. New World is an institution that claims to offer spiritual guidance to distraught youth. In reality, New World is the headquarters for the Intelligence's new plan to conquer the world by infecting all of the computers. Both the administration and students await the coming of a "new world" that will be heralded by the chancellor, the Intelligence-possessed Travers.

Victoria's motives are well-meaning but misguided, having been manipulated with a promised "light of truth". The students themselves have been brainwashed through their computer courses and are slaves of the Intelligence. Outsiders refer to them as "chillys".

The Intelligence needs a final missing Locus to attain its goal. It believes the Brigadier has it, but the locus (a small wooden carving of a yeti) is actually with his daughter Kate and grandson Gordon on their narrowboat.

New World attempts to gather information on the Brigadier by asking Sarah Jane Smith to investigate him. Sarah lies about knowing the Brigadier and later warns both him and UNIT. The Intelligence then arranges a meeting between the Brigadier and a corrupt UNIT captain named Cavendish.

Throughout the story the Brigadier is aided by a New World student named Daniel Hinton, a former student of his from the Brendon School. The Intelligence's conditioning failed on Hinton, though at times he is still under its influence and at one point becomes a Yeti. He can communicate with the Brigadier through the bardo or astral plane.

== Cast ==
- Nicholas Courtney – Brigadier Lethbridge-Stewart. The hero of the story, the Brigadier is targeted by the Great Intelligence in revenge for their defeat in the previous story The Web of Fear. Now living by himself, the Brigadier is initially distant from his daughter Kate (and it is implied that he is separated from Doris). At the story's conclusion, Lethbridge-Stewart learns that he is grandfather to Gordon James, his daughter's only child. Courtney was recruited by producer Keith Barnfather in early 1993 and was keen to take part in the production, although he later admitted to finding it a challenge due to his age (being 65 when production started) as well as differences in single camera filming compared to the more traditional multi-camera setup previously used on Doctor Who. Production on Downtime needed to be delayed a few months as Courtney was committed to a part in a West End production of The Mousetrap.
- Elisabeth Sladen – Sarah Jane Smith. A journalist working for Metropolitan Magazine, Sarah-Jane is initially contacted by Victoria Waterfield to provide information on UNIT Personnel, including the Brigadier. Suspicious of their motives, Sarah-Jane attempts to contact the Brigadier and, at the story's conclusion, allies herself with his daughter Kate. Director Chris Barry had been reunited with Sladen at a Doctor Who convention in Chicago and felt that she would fit the role of the 'female journalist' in the script well. As with other characters originally from Doctor Who, producer Barnfather was required to negotiate with the BBC in order to make use of Sarah Jane in his script.
- Deborah Watling – Victoria Waterfield. A former companion of the Doctor, Victoria feels alone and stranded in the 20th century. Using money that her father has left her, she has built the New World Campus and is, naïvely, trying to locate her father using the locus. The Great Intelligence takes advantage of her naivete and her position as Vice-Chancellor but she eventually sees through their deception. At the end of the story, with the Great Intelligence defeated she disappears with no known trace. Watling was pleased to take part in the production, not as a young, naive Victoria but as a 'power woman' of the 1990s. Like Courtney, she was also committed to a West End production (Don't Dress Down For Dinner), but had the advantage that her role attracted the interest of her father Jack.
- Jack Watling – Professor Edward Travers. A former adversary of the Great Intelligence who has faced them twice before (in the stories The Abominable Snowmen and The Web of Fear, Travers is now their pawn and seeks freedom through finding the last locus. Watling had appeared twice as Travers previously in Doctor Who (The Abominable Snowmen and The Web of Fear) and, after seeing his daughter cast in the production, was keen to take part himself. The addition of both Watlings caused the budget of the production to grow more than initially planned.
- Beverley Cressman – Kate Lethbridge-Stewart. The only daughter of Brigadier Lethbridge-Stewart, Kate lives with her only son Gordon James ('Gordy') on a houseboat. Unbeknownst to her, she possesses the last remaining locus in a toy chest, which has taken the form of a wooden yeti carving. Kate is initially resentful of her father, blaming his work for the disintegration of their family, although they make their peace at the story's conclusion. Cressman was, at the time, married to Miles Richardson and became involved in the production when her husband was cast as Captain Cavendish. Despite being a newcomer to the team of already established Doctor Who actors, she quickly became admired by Nicholas Courtney who felt she performed her role 'admirably'. The character of Kate Lethbridge-Stewart would return in another direct-to-video production (2004's Daemos Rising) before becoming a recurring character in later series of the revived Doctor Who (although the role would be recast to Jemma Redgrave).
- Mark Trotman – Daniel Hinton. A former student of the Brigadier's at Brendon School, the rebellious Hinton is initially immune to the influence of the Great Intelligence, although her later comes into contact with one of the yeti control spheres and is transformed into one. A computer hacker, he is friends with the university's DJ Anthony and attempts to warn the Brigadier about the Great Intelligence's plot before he is revealed as the trap designed to capture him. It is implied at the end of the story that Hinton has died and entered the astral plane, through which he communicates with the Brigadier's grandson. Trotman had appeared in an earlier direct-to-DVD Doctor Who spinoff, More Than A Messiah, which was the second film in The Stranger series with Colin Baker. Christopher Barry cast him due to him looking relatively younger than his age.
- Geoffrey Beevers – Harrod Haroldson. A former RAF officer, Flight Sergeant Haroldson is now homeless and has earned the nickname 'Harrod's' because he is fussy about where he sleeps as a vagrant. Harrods is loyal to the Brigadier and attempts to help him mount a defence against the Great Intelligence. Beevers was the husband of former Doctor Who companion Caroline John and had previously appeared in a small role in The Ambassadors of Death and as the reincarnated Master in Tom Baker's penultimate story The Keeper of Traken.
- Peter Silverleef – Christopher Rice. The marketing manager at New World University, Rice is a pawn of the Great Intelligence and attempts to seize power for himself at the story's conclusion but is destroyed in the crossfire. The role was Silverleef's only appearance in a Doctor Who-related production — he would later go on to smaller roles in shows like Doctors and The Bill.
- John Leeson – Anthony. The DJ of New World University, Anthony is antagonistic towards Victoria and Christopher Rice, resentful of having to transmit propaganda; after he attempts to broadcast the truth, he is consumed by the Great Intelligence. Leeson was most famous for being the voice of K-9 but also had experience as a voiceover announcer, making him suitable for this role.
- Miles Richardson – Captain Douglas Cavendish. A UNIT captain who is, in reality controlled by the Great Intelligence, he attempts to extract information about the final locus from Lethbridge-Stewart. Cavendish survives the conflict and resigns from UNIT, his story is continued in the follow-up drama Daemos Rising. Richardson was married to Kate Lethbridge-Stewart actor Beverly Cressman at the time of the production.
- James Bree – Lama. The Lama at the Det-Sen Monastery, he appears at the beginning of the story attempting to warn Victoria away from the Great Intelligence. Bree had featured in Doctor Who previously, most notably as the Security Chief in Patrick Troughton's final story The War Games, Nefred in Full Circle and The Keeper of the Matrix in Colin Baker's final story The Trial of a Timelord.
- Kathy Coutler – Receptionist.
- Alexander Landen – Gordon Lethbridge-Stewart

== Production notes ==
The initial script read through took place in March 1995, with filming beginning on Friday 24 March in South-West London with the scenes set at the Brigadier's home.

The university campus scenes were shot at the University of East Anglia in Norwich. DWB Editor Anthony Brown, who had attended UEA, suggested the location after another had fallen through, as the distinctive Ziggurat-shaped student residences Norfolk and Suffolk Terrace echoed pyramid motifs in the script. UEA students were recruited as 'Chillys' (extras) through the campus newspaper Concrete. Filming at the university was delayed slightly when the fire alarm sounded during the recording of some internal scenes.

Production of some external scenes had to be rescheduled thanks to unseasonal spring snow storms — ironically, snow was conspicuously absent from the first Yeti story, The Abominable Snowmen.

The later Reeltime production Dæmos Rising followed up on some of the elements of this story, specifically with the characters of Kate Lethbridge-Stewart and Captain Cavendish.

A clip from one of the scenes with Sarah and the Brigadier was planned to be shown as a flashback in The Sarah Jane Adventures. However, when the BBC requested permission from the owners of the Downtime copyright, it was refused and the clip was not shown.

Daniel Hinton is named after Craig Hinton, the Doctor Who fan and novelist.

== Soundtrack release ==
Downtime – Original Soundtrack Recording

Soundtrack album by Ian Levine, Nigel Stock, and Erwin Keiles
- Released: December 1995
- Genre: Soundtrack
- Label: Silva Screen

Music from this video composed by Ian Levine, Nigel Stock, and Erwin Keiles was released on CD by Silva Screen Records in December 1995. The 'Monastic chant' heard in the opening and closing themes was the same chant that was used in the Doctor Who story Planet of the Spiders.

=== Track listing ===
All tracks are written by Ian Levine, Nigel Stock, and Erwin Keiles.

No.	Title	Length
1.	"Introduction: Detsen Monastery and Title Sequence"
2.	"Astral Plane"
3.	"Confrontation"
4.	"Eerie"
5.	"First Chase"
6.	"Second Chase"
7.	"Truth"
8.	"Chase/Astral Plane"
9.	"Brigadier's Lost Memory"
10.	"Intelligence"
11.	"Message Understood"
12.	"He Fell"
13.	"Hallucination"
14.	"Astral Plane"
15.	"Travers"
16.	"I'm Still Alive"
17.	"Danny Was Right"
18.	"Double Cross"
19.	"Sting"
20.	"Build Up"
21.	"Apparition"
22.	"Stranger"
23.	"Realisation"
24.	"Family/Yeti Themes"
25.	"Approach"
26.	"Single Sting"
27.	"Lift"
28.	"Webs"
29.	"Attack"
30.	"Yeti March"
31.	"Climax"
32.	"Victoria"
33.	"Family Theme"
34.	"End Credits"

== Novelisation ==
Downtime
- Author: Marc Platt
- Series: Doctor Who book: Virgin Missing Adventures
- Release number: 18
- Subject: Featuring: Victoria Waterfield; Alistair Lethbridge-Stewart; Sarah Jane Smith
- Set in: Period between Fury from the Deep and Battlefield (main story); The Web of Fear and Twilight of the Gods (Second Doctor cameo); "The Five Doctors" and Island of Death (Third Doctor cameo)
- Publisher: Virgin Books
- Publication date: January 1996
- Pages: 263
- ISBN: 0-426-20462-X
- Preceded by: Lords of the Storm
- Followed by: The Man in the Velvet Mask

In 1996 a novelisation of Downtime by Marc Platt was published by Virgin Publishing as part of their Missing Adventures line. It expands greatly on the original story and features many differences in plot. It is the only Missing Adventure not to centre on the Doctor, although the Second Doctor makes a cameo at the start of the novel, and the Third Doctor makes a cameo at the end.

The novelisation included an 8-page photo insert of behind-the-scenes images taken by photographer Robin Prichard during the film production.

== Release ==
The film was a direct to video VHS release in 1995. A substantial amount of behind-the-scenes material was also intended to be released as a separate VHS entitled The Making of Downtime and was even advertised as such on later video releases but did not materialize. The twenty year gap between the VHS and DVD releases was due to rights issues between the three main parties who had funded the initial production.

Then, in 2015 One Media iP Limited acquired the drama and re-released it as a 2-DVD boxset in November 2015. The second disc contains two behind-the-scenes documentaries showing the filming of the drama and the post-production process.

The release of the DVD edition was met with some controversy when the granddaughter of Mervyn Haisman, who had co-created the Yeti and Brigadier with Henry Lincoln attempted to take legal action to block the release of the DVD, rationalizing that permission had not been sought or renegotiated for the DVD release. Additional controversy presented itself in 2012 when Ian Levine attempted to make his own re-edit of Downtime, entitled Downtime Redux which sought to bookend the film with a cameo from 7th Doctor Sylvester McCoy in order to show that it was in fact the Doctor who had been manipulating events the whole time. The new edit remains unreleased to this day, primarily due to rights issues with the BBC.

== Reception ==
The film received overall mixed reviews from critics. Dave Owen of Doctor Who Magazine praised the performance of Nicholas Courtney, stating that he was, "the undeniable star of the show". Similarly, Dylan Rees reviewed the film in his book Downtime - The Lost Years of Doctor Who, praising the character arcs of the Brigadier and Victoria, but criticized the Yeti costumes, although he stated the production was "incredibly high for a film of this nature.
