= Beverley Cressman =

British actress

- Born: Dorridge, Warwickshire, England
- Education: Nottingham Trent University
- Occupation: Actress
- Years active: 1995–present
- Spouse: Miles Richardson (m. 1994; div. 2009)
- Children: 3

Beverley Cressman is a British actress, best known for being the first person cast as Kate Lethbridge-Stewart. She appeared in two unofficial direct-to-video Doctor Who spin-offs, Downtime (1995), and Dæmos Rising (2004).

== Career ==
Cressman was trained as an actor at the Guildford School of Acting. In 1995, Cressman played Kate Lethbridge-Stewart in the Reeltime Pictures film Downtime. The film also starred Nicholas Courtney as the Brigadier and Elisabeth Sladen as Sarah Jane Smith. In 1999, Cressman appeared as a driving instructor in the TV series Grange Hill. In the same year Cressman played Debbie Hunter in the Pig Heart Boy episode Losing It. Cressman played the role of Kate Lethbridge-Stewart again in the 2004 film Dæmos Rising. She starred in this film alongside her then husband Miles Richardson. In 2012, the then current Doctor Who production team decided to re-introduce Cressman's character. The role was re-cast and given to Jemma Redgrave. In 2018 it was announced that Cressman would reprise her role as Kate Lethbridge-Stewart in the Reeltime drama film Anomaly.

Cressman also works as a voice over artist and a QVC guest presenter. Furthermore, she voiced Clarissa Jones in Big Finish's Death and the Daleks and Doctor Carnive in The Mirror Effect.

== Personal life ==
In 1994 Cressman married Miles Richardson. As of 2005 the couple had two sons. In 2009 the couple were divorced. As of August 2015 Cressman lives in Warwickshire along with her three sons.

== Filmography ==
=== Film ===
Year	Title	Role	Notes
1995	Downtime	Kate Lethbridge-Stewart	Main role
2004	Dæmos Rising	Kate Lethbridge-Stewart	Main role
2013	Ian Levine: Downtime Redux	Kate Lethbridge-Stewart	Main role
2020	Anomaly	Kate Lethbridge-Stewart	Main role

=== TV series ===
Year	Title	Role	Notes
1999	Grange Hill	Driving Instructor	Episode #22.11
1999	Pig Heart Boy	Debbie Hunter	Episode Losing It
2001	Rex the Runt		Episode Wayne the Zebra

== Audio plays ==
Year	Title	Role	Series
2003	The Mirror Effect	Doctor Carnivel	Bernice Summerfield
2004	Death and the Daleks	Clarissa Jones	Bernice Summerfield
