= Kate Lethbridge-Stewart =

Fictional character from Doctor Who

- Doctor Who character
- Jemma Redgrave as Kate Lethbridge-Stewart
- First appearance: Downtime (1995)
- Last appearance: The End of the War (2025)
- Created by: Marc Platt
- Portrayed by: Beverley Cressman (1995, 2004); Jemma Redgrave (2012–2025)
- Shared universe appearances: Downtime (1995); Dæmos Rising (2004); Doctor Who (2012–2025); The War Between the Land and the Sea (2025)
- Duration: 1995; 2004; 2012–2015; 2021–2025

In-universe information
- Species: Human
- Gender: Female
- Affiliation: UNIT; The Doctor
- Family: Alistair Lethbridge-Stewart (father)
- Children: Gordon Lethbridge-Stewart (son); Unnamed daughter
- Home: Earth
- Nationality: British (English)
- Home era: 21st century

Kate Lethbridge-Stewart, formerly known as Kate Stewart, is a fictional character in the British science fiction television series Doctor Who and its spin-off series, The War Between the Land and the Sea. She was created by writer Marc Platt and first portrayed by Beverley Cressman in the independent direct-to-video spin-offs Downtime (1995) and Dæmos Rising (2004). The character was reintroduced in the revived series by Chris Chibnall in the 2012 episode "The Power of Three," portrayed by Jemma Redgrave, who has continued in the role since then. Redgrave subsequently reprised her role as a lead character in the spin-off series The War Between the Land and the Sea in 2025.

Kate is the daughter of Brigadier Lethbridge-Stewart, a key figure from the classic series. Within the narrative, she leads the Unified Intelligence Taskforce (UNIT), a military organization dedicated to defend Earth against alien threats, as head of Scientific Research and later as commander-in-chief. She has appeared alongside multiple incarnations of the Doctor, including the War, Tenth, Eleventh, Twelfth, Thirteenth, Fourteenth, and Fifteenth Doctors. The character was received positively for bringing a more sympathetic, science-based approach to UNIT, though critics noted her increasing moral ambiguity in later appearances.

== Appearances ==
=== Video ===
Kate Lethbridge-Stewart first appears in the direct-to-video spin-off Downtime (1995), in which Kate is depicted as having grown up not knowing of her father Brigadier Lethbridge-Stewart's work fighting extraterrestrial threats in the Unified Intelligence Taskforce (UNIT) and believing he had a more ordinary military job. Blaming his work for the disintegration of their family, she becomes estranged from him and lives on a narrowboat with her only son, Gordon. However, a shared experience fighting the Great Intelligence alongside the Brigadier and Sarah Jane Smith allows her to reconnect with her father and develop a closer relationship. Later, Kate battles a Dæmon alongside ex-UNIT operative Douglas Cavendish in the direct-to-video spin-off Dæmos Rising (2004).

=== Television ===
Kate is introduced on television in the 2012 Doctor Who episode "The Power of Three", where she meets the Doctor for the first time in his eleventh incarnation. She is now the head of Scientific Research for UNIT, opting to lead the military organisation towards a more science-based approach, and has dropped Lethbridge from her surname as to not receive any special favours. She and the Doctor endure "the Year of the Slow Invasion", during which cubes are sent by the Shakri to observe the human race in advance of an impending attack, and manage to stop them. In "The Day of the Doctor" (2013), Kate and UNIT's scientific advisor Petronella Osgood encounter the Eleventh Doctor again alongside his earlier incarnations, the War Doctor and the Tenth Doctor. They confront shape-shifting Zygons in the Black Archive, UNIT's secret vault in the Tower of London, and negotiate a peace treaty allowing 20 million Zygons to settle on Earth disguised as humans.

Kate works alongside the Twelfth Doctor for the first time in "Death in Heaven" (2014). When Cybermen are released onto the streets by Missy, Kate and Osgood arrive with UNIT officers and take Missy and the Doctor into custody on the plane Boat One. However, Missy escapes when Cybermen attack Boat One, during which a part of the fuselage blows off and Kate is sucked out of the plane. She is saved and returned safely to the ground by her father, who was converted into a Cyberman. Later, Kate summons Clara Oswald to UNIT headquarters in "The Magician's Apprentice" (2015) when Missy freezes all planes on Earth, which turns out to be her way to get UNIT's attention to arrange a meeting with Clara. In "The Zygon Invasion" / "The Zygon Inversion" (2015), Kate goes to Truth or Consequences, New Mexico to investigate a splinter group of Zygons who start an uprising after rejecting the peace treaty made with humans. Surviving an attack by a Zygon rebel, she takes its place and reconvenes with the Doctor in the Black Archive. A standoff ensues there between her and the Zygon rebel leader Bonnie with two Osgood Boxes that could unmask or destroy every Zygon on the planet. Aided by the Doctor, the conflict ends with both sides re-affirming the peace treaty.

Kate re-appears in "Survivors of the Flux" (2021), which reveals that an alien by the name of the Grand Serpent infiltrated UNIT over several decades and facilitates its shutdown in 2017. When Kate threatens to expose him, she is forced to go on the run after a failed attempt on her life. During the 2021 Sontaran invasion of Earth in "The Vanquishers" (2021), Kate emerges to lead the human resistance and triumphs with the help of the Thirteenth Doctor. By 2022, Kate is able to re-establish UNIT. She takes the Master into custody in "The Power of the Doctor" (2022), but UNIT's headquarters are overrun by Cybermen and blown up. Kate attends a companion support group meeting and discusses recruiting them to UNIT.

Kate begins using her full surname Lethbridge-Stewart again and has become the commander-in-chief of UNIT by the time she meets the Fourteenth Doctor in "The Giggle" (2023). Together, they face and defeat the Toymaker, a battle which causes the Doctor to bi-generate into the Fifteenth Doctor. During an alternative timeline shown in "73 Yards" (2024), Ruby Sunday goes to Kate for help regarding a mysterious woman following her and causing all others who approach the woman to flee; in her attempt to capture the woman, Kate befalls the same fate and abandons Ruby. In "The Legend of Ruby Sunday" / "Empire of Death" (2024), the Fifteenth Doctor and Ruby come to UNIT for help regarding the mysteries of Ruby's mother and the recurring face of Susan Triad, whom they discover is actually the harbinger of the god of death, Sutekh. Sutekh destroys all life on Earth, killing everyone including Kate, but she is brought back to life after his defeat by the Doctor.

In "Lucky Day" (2025), Ruby's new boyfriend Conrad Clark turns out to be using her in pursuit of his agenda of turning the public against UNIT. Following the appearance of creatures called Shreek supposedly hunting Conrad, Ruby calls Kate for help, who arrives with UNIT soldiers to stop the creatures. However, they are revealed to be fake while Conrad livestreams the encounter, a setup orchestrated by him to spread a conspiracy theory claiming the non-existence of aliens and fraud by UNIT. As a result, Kate has to deal with growing distrust by the British public as media coverage turns against the organization. Conrad infiltrates UNIT's headquarters with a gun and a camera live-streaming to his social media to demand Kate admit to his conspiracy. She reacts by releasing the real Shreek upon Conrad and refusing to help him until he admits on air that he was lying for personal gain. Although UNIT is saved as a result, there is some concern about Kate's willingness to cross the line and the potential consequences of her actions which she brushes off. "Wish World" / "The Reality War" depicts an altered reality created by the Rani and overseen by Conrad in which Kate serves as the head of the Unified National Insurance Team. The Doctor and Anita Benn, an employee at the Time Hotel, use the hotel's doors to restore the true memories of everyone at UNIT headquarters, who then send signals to microchips installed in every UNIT employee in London to break them out of the illusion as well. The Rani unleashes creatures called Bone Beasts on UNIT, leaving Kate and UNIT to defend themselves, before the Doctor restores reality back to normal.

In The War Between the Land and the Sea, UNIT was entrusted to oversee diplomatic relations between the human race and the Sea Devils, now known as "Homo Aqua". As a result of this, her subordinate and low-level UNIT transportation logistics manager, Barclay Pierre-Dupont, is unexpectedly appointed as humanity's ambassador and Kate is forced to help him and Homo Aqua in the process. Later when Downing Street prepared a new war plan to exterminate Homo Aqua, named "Severance", they also made a attempt to assassinate Kate in her home due to her helping the Homo Aqua. Unfortunately for Kate, her friend Colonel Christofer "Chris" Ibrahim was with her, having previously tried to protect her during Sutekh's wrath. When Chris noticed that a red dot was aimed on her forehead, he pushed her out of the way and was shot and killed. Kate struggles with PTSD afterwards, even blackmailing her therapist to increase her paroxetine dose to cope with the loss. Later, after Downing Street releases a virus that killed 90% of Homo Aqua as part of "Severance", Kate drives Barclay to the sea, and they both find Salt, the Homo Aqua's Ambassador, there to greet them. Salt gives Barclay gills, and they swim away together, with Kate watching on sure. Afterwards, a broken Kate threatens a nearby jogger at gunpoint when he dumps a plastic bottle near the shore.

=== Audio drama ===
Beginning in 2015, Jemma Redgrave reprised the role of Kate for the ongoing Big Finish Productions audio drama series UNIT, which marked the company's first major release featuring characters from the revived Doctor Who series. The series also starred Ingrid Oliver as Petronella Osgood, who appeared on television as UNIT's scientific advisor. The first four-part boxset of the series, Extinction, saw the team confront an alien invasion by the Nestene Consciousness's army of plastic Autons. Kate crossed over with Big Finish's main line of Doctor Who audio dramas on two special occasions. The first was in The Sacrifice of Jo Grant, the third part of the boxset The Legacy of Time celebrating the company's 20th anniversary, which featured Kate traveling back in time to the classic UNIT era and meeting the Third Doctor and Jo Grant, played by Tim Treolar and Katy Manning respectively. She also appeared in the audio drama Past Lives, the first of a seven-part series produced for the programme' 60th anniversary entitled Once and Future, in which Redgrave starred opposite Tom Baker as Fourth Doctor, Sadie Miller as Sarah Jane Smith, and Rufus Hound as the Monk.

== Development ==
The character of Kate Lethbridge-Stewart was initially created by Marc Platt for the spin-off drama Downtime, which was released direct-to-video by Reeltime Productions in September 1995 during the period that Doctor Who was off-air. In the release, Kate, played by British actress Beverley Cressman, is shown to be the daughter of Brigadier Lethbridge-Stewart and lives with a son named Gordon. Cressman spoke positively of her filming experience in an interview for the online Doctor Who convention Time Space Visualiser, describing her joy in working with such established actors as well as the "easy, natural relationship" between herself and the Brigadier's actor Nicholas Courtney that allowed them to develop the father-daughter dynamic in the script. Downtime was novelized by Platt in January 1996 as part of the Virgin Missing Adventures series, and was followed by the novel The Scales of Injustice by Gary Russell in July, which revealed that Kate was the daughter of the Brigadier and his first wife Fiona. Cressman reprised her role as Kate for a sequel spin-off drama entitled Dæmos Rising (2004), which was released direct-to-DVD by Reeltime Productions in March 2004.

When writing the episode "The Power of Three" (2012) for Doctor Who's seventh series, Chris Chibnall felt it was appropriate for the episode's plot of a year-long slow invasion to bring back the Unified Intelligence Taskforce (UNIT), which had played a central role in the show's classic run. The series' showrunner Steven Moffat enthusiastically agreed when Chibnall asked whether he could bring back the organisation. According to Moffat, Chibnall then decided to add a twist regarding the new leader of UNIT which the BBC was not aware of until the script was delivered. In 2011, Nicholas Courtney died, which was reflected in-universe with the Doctor finding out about the Brigadier's death in the episode "The Wedding of River Song" (2011). To pay tribute to Courtney, Chibnall came up with the twist of having UNIT be led by the Brigadier's daughter, Kate Stewart. In an interview with Radio Times, Chibnall explained that "Given that we were bringing back UNIT, I thought it would be a nice way to honour the character of the Brigadier and Nicholas Courtney’s contribution to the show by anchoring UNIT to his family. It was a way to keep that family line going, after we’d heard last year on screen that the Brigadier had died." Her character was developed to be "intelligent, quick-witted" and with "a dry sense of humour." Though she shared qualities with the Brigadier like loyalty towards the Doctor and a desire to serve humanity, unlike him she preferred to use a scientific approach rather than military tactics. Once the script was in production, Chibnall, primarily a fan of the television series, was surprised to discover that the character of Kate already existed in non-television spin-off media, which he had been completely unaware of.

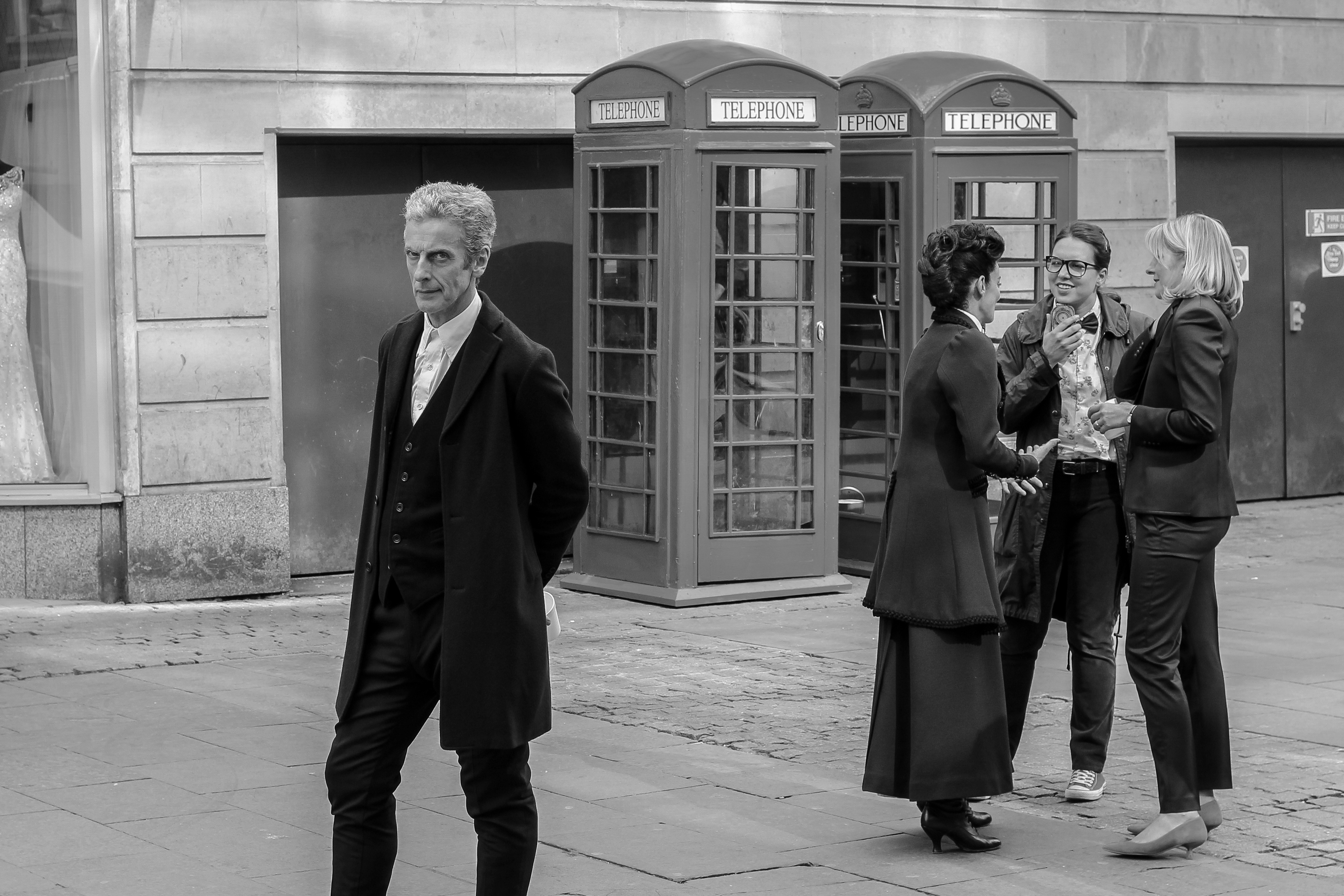
From right to left, Jemma Redgrave during the filming of "Death in Heaven" alongside Ingrid Oliver, Michelle Gomez, and Peter Capaldi

British actress Jemma Redgrave was cast in the role of Kate Stewart, replacing Beverly Cressman. Though initially daunted at joining the show, Redgrave was excited since she had watched the show as a child and more recently with her children, telling Doctor Who Magazine that "It's a privilege to be part of something that's captured the imagination of children." Cressman praised her replacement as a "fantastic actress"; when asked if she felt Redgrave's take was influenced by her own, she professed, "I don't think she's referred to me personally or my performance […] but certainly in terms of the character and, you know, she's got a great take on it actually which I think is brilliant." Similarly, her co-star Matt Smith, who played the Eleventh Doctor, professed "I loved Jemma Redgrave!" in a BBC interview and praised her as "graceful, funny and charming and an absolute delight." When asked whether Kate and UNIT would return, Chris Chibnall responded, "I always love to see UNIT pop up, but whether they return, well that is a question for Steven Moffat..." Redgrave also expressed enthusiasm about the possibility of returning on the show, "I should be so lucky! I’d be so privileged. I keep using that word. I should use a different word. But I do feel that. It’d be great to come back. Yes, I’d love that." Moffat decided to bring back Kate for the programme's 50th anniversary special "The Day of the Doctor" (2013) and additionally introduced Ingrid Oliver as UNIT's scientific advisor Petronella Osgood. Kate and Osgood continued as recurring characters for the remainder of Moffat's time as showrunner, appearing in four episodes of the programme's eighth (2014) and ninth series (2015) alongside Peter Capaldi as the Twelfth Doctor. Redgrave was intended to appear in the tenth series episode "The Pyramid at the End of the World" (2017), but her character was replaced by Colonel Walsh in the final script due to her prior filming commitments for the BBC drama Holby City.

After six years off-screen, Redgrave made a surprise return during Chris Chibnall's period as showrunner in the final two episodes of the thirteenth series, Flux (2021). She appeared again in the BBC centenary special "The Power of the Doctor" (2022), which was Jodie Whittaker's final episode as the Thirteenth Doctor. Following Russell T Davies' return as showrunner the following year, Redgrave reprised the role of Kate, now using the full surname Lethbridge-Stewart, in the 60th anniversary special "The Giggle" (2023), which starred David Tennant as the Fourteenth Doctor. The special reimagined UNIT in the vein of the organisation S.H.I.E.L.D. in the Marvel Cinematic Universe (MCU) with a new supporting cast, including Alexander Devrient as Colonel Christofer Ibrahim, and a new headquarters that fans compared to the MCU's Avengers Tower. Kate and the new UNIT made recurring appearances in six episodes of the programme's fourteenth (2024) and fifteenth series (2025) led by Ncuti Gatwa as the Fifteenth Doctor. This included the episode "Lucky Day", which depicted how UNIT operates in the absence of the Doctor and showed a darker side of Kate. The episode's writer Pete McTighe highlighted the "extremes that Kate is driven to by the end of the episode" and teased that "how we leave her in this episode, and at the end of the season, really sets her up for what’s to come", referring to the show's upcoming spin-off series.

Deadline first reported in March 2023 that according to BBC sources, a Doctor Who spin-off was in the works based on UNIT and will star Jemma Redgrave as Kate Stewart. Redgrave denied knowing anything about a UNIT spin-off in September, but confirmed her participation in Gatwa's first season, expressing "it's such a wonderful thing to be part of that family. It was absolutely tremendous and to be part of Russell T Davies' vision is so exciting." In July 2024, Davies confirmed at San Diego Comic-Con that a new Doctor Who spin-off series on BBC One and Disney+ titled The War Between the Land and the Sea was set to begin filming that September. Created by Davies and McTighe, the series featured UNIT fighting against the Sea Devils. Jemma Redgrave and Alexander Devrient reprised their respective roles as Kate Lethbridge-Stewart and Colonel Ibrahim for the spin-off, alongside Russell Tovey and Gugu Mbatha-Raw as new characters.

== Critical reception ==
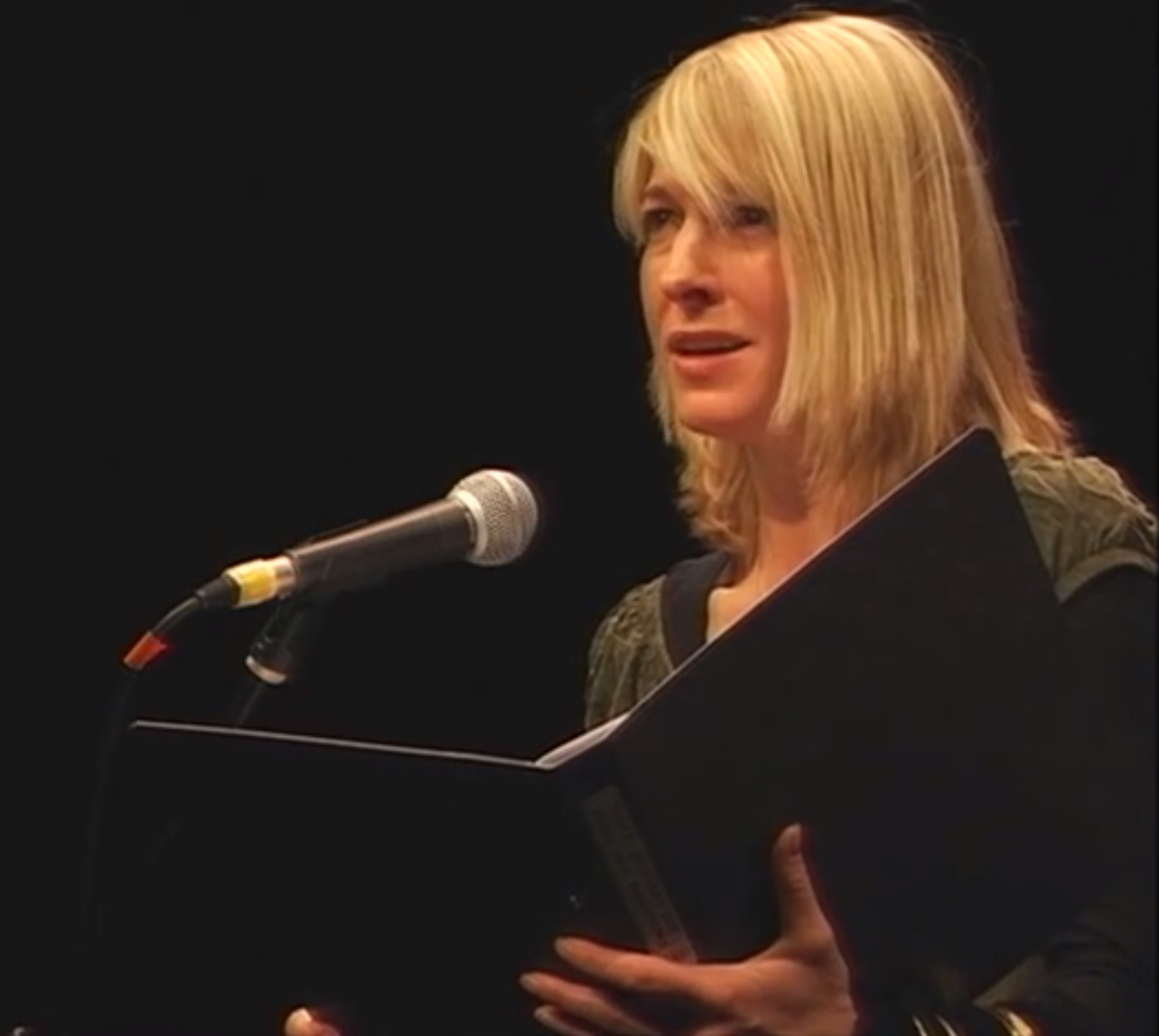
Jemma Redgrave was well received by critics for her portrayal of Kate Lethbridge-Stewart.

Following her initial appearance in "The Power of Three", Kate Lethbridge-Stewart received positive reviews as an endearing character that introduced a less militarized approach to UNIT. Patrick Mulkern of Radio Times welcomed the character as "a wonderful addition" to the show and enthused about Jemma Redgrave's "class-act casting," describing her as "elegant, earnest, warm" and requesting that she come back regularly. Similarly, Digital Spy reviewer Morgan Jeffery felt that Redgrave "immediately endears herself" as Kate and praised the "lovely moment" that was her reveal as the Brigadier's daughter. Neela Debnath, writing for The Independent, thought that the re-introduction of Kate as head of UNIT was "a wonderful way of preserving the Doctor’s relationship with the organisation and Brigadier Alistair Gordon Lethbridge-Stewart." The Daily Telegraph reviewer Gavin Fuller agreed that her leading her father's organisation was a "lovely touch" and praised Redgrave's portrayal, stating that he would like to see the character return in the future as well. In his book Doctor Who: An Inner Alien?, Danny Nicol described Kate in her initial appearance as a "sympathetic character" that could herald a "nostalgic return to the good old internationalist UNIT of the 1970s", in contrast to the deteriorated reputation of the organization during Russell T. Davies' tenure as showrunner in the 2000s. Likewise, Valeri Estelle Frankel, writer of the book Women in Doctor Who: Damsels, Feminists, and Monsters, found Kate to be an improvement over the "warrior model" embodied by Davies era character Harriet Jones, instead protecting the world with a more subtle approach.

In her later appearances, critics continued to praise Redgrave's performance while noting Kate's increasing moral ambiguity and flaws in leadership. Her willingness to blow up London to prevent an arsenal of weapons falling into the hands of Zygons in "The Day of the Doctor" was criticized by Nicol for compromising UNIT's legitimacy and esteem. The author compared UNIT's shortcomings under Kate's leadership to real-world examples of peacemaking failures by the United Nations and Western aggression in countries like Iraq. Similarly, Frankel found fault with how the resolution of "The Day of the Doctor" necessitated that "the female leaders need the Doctor's intervention to keep them on the path of morality." In her essay "The River, the Rock, the Relative, and the Returned: Depictions of Women Scientists in Moffat's Doctor Who Era", Kristine Larsen noted that the scene in the episode where Kate has UNIT bring the TARDIS by helicopter sky crane to their headquarters without realizing the Doctor and his companion were still inside was an example of Kate's continual errors in judgement. Kate's appearance in "Death in Heaven" was well received, with Mulkern of Radio Times lauding Redgrave's "measured, classy performance" in the episode. Frankel praised her introductory dialogue in the episode for claiming power both as a mother and a military leader, and her dynamic with the Doctor in which she appoints him to power while keeping him on a tight leash. She also commended the "tearjerker moment" when her father, converted into a Cybermen after death, saves her life, describing it as a "lovely salute" that gave Kate's character more depth. However, Larsen used the same scene as an example of how Kate often relies on others to save her in the show. The author criticized Kate's lack of confidence and over-reliance of the Doctor for guidance, such as in "The Magician's Apprentice". In the episode, her first response after all the planes are frozen in time midflight is to call the Doctor and panic when he doesn't respond.

Kate's depiction in "The Zygon Invasion" / "The Zygon Inversion" divided critics, with some finding her approach to dealing with the Zygon rebels more militant and aggressive while others found it to be in line with her initial portrayal. Vulture's Ross Ruediger described Kate in the episodes as "sharper and more in tune with the complexities of the changing world than her father ... ever was" and praised her first instincts of leading and investigating rather than immediately attacking the Zygon rebels. Doctor Who TV contributor Nathan Lobo concurred and lauded the "fantastic Kate Stewart" for "her tendency to favour non-violent and scientific methods of sorting out issues instead of just going in guns blazing ... as her father preferred to do before he met the Doctor." On the other hand, Larsen expressly rejected this analysis and argued that Kate demonstrated "hawkish tendencies" in the story, often appealing towards "technology of mass destruction" to solve problems. Kaite Welsh of IndieWire praised Kate's darker portrayal in the story and the tension it created between her and the Doctor's differing approaches, adding that "Redgrave is at her best when there’s a glint of the zealot about her."

== See also ==
- List of Doctor Who supporting characters
