= Reeltime Pictures =

British video production company

Reeltime Pictures Ltd is a British film, television and video production company and a distributor of the films of other companies, founded in 1984 by Keith Barnfather.

As well as producing corporate and business television, it has made a number of broadcast documentary series including Lost Trains of Cyprus and Phoenix – A Story from the Diaspora.

The company is also known for its many documentaries about the long-running television series Doctor Who (Barnfather was a founding member of the Doctor Who Appreciation Society) and in particular for Myth Makers, a series of interviews with people associated with the making of the series. Many of these programs were hosted by actor Nicholas Briggs, who provided the voice of the Daleks in the 2005 series of Doctor Who.

Reeltime Pictures also pioneered a technique of creating direct-to-video Doctor Who spin-offs, despite the BBC's close guarding of the series, by building the spin-offs around incidental characters and monsters licensed directly from the writers who created them. Their first effort, 1987's Wartime, was a small-scale piece built around Sergeant Benton of UNIT, a recurring character from the 1970s. In 1987, Reeltime produced Myth Runner, a parody of Blade Runner written, directed by and starring Briggs, featuring outtakes from the Myth Makers video series.

Later and more ambitious productions include Mindgame, Downtime, and Dæmos Rising. Despite its non-BBC-licensed status, a novelisation of Downtime was released as part of the BBC-licensed Virgin Missing Adventures Doctor Who spin-off novels. The narrative of Downtime was expanded to incorporate the Doctor, a character missing from the video version for copyright reasons, with the narrative of the original production forming the middle third of the novel.

The success of these ventures inspired and opened the door for later releases by BBV and Big Finish Productions with storylines featuring characters and races from Doctor Who, but not necessarily the Doctor himself (although BBV produced two series featuring Doctor-like characters portrayed by Colin Baker and Sylvester McCoy, while Big Finish also obtained a license that allowed them to feature the Doctor).

The company continues to output a wide variety of programming, including patient information films for Moorfields Eye Hospital.

== Video dramas ==
- Wartime (1988) – the first independent spin-off production from Doctor Who, and the only one released while the series was still broadcasting. The storyline features UNIT soldier John Benton finding himself trapped in an alternate reality.
- Downtime (1995) – more popular characters were revived, as The Brigadier (Nicholas Courtney), Sarah Jane Smith (Elisabeth Sladen) and Victoria Waterfield (Deborah Watling) all reprised their roles. The Yeti also made a comeback. The story also introduced the character of the Brigadier's daughter Kate who later appeared in the official series from the Eleventh doctor onwards.
- Mindgame (1998) – a Sontaran, a Draconian and a Human are trapped together by an unknown enemy. Sophie Aldred, who had played Ace in Doctor Who, stars alongside the villainous Sontarans and Draconians.
- Lust in Space (1998) – a film in which features fictionalised versions of Katy Manning, Sophie Aldred and Nicholas Briggs and asks the question "Is Doctor Who sexist?". It also features Nicholas Courtney and Mark Strickson as Time Judges and interviews with previous companions.
- Mindgame Trilogy (1999) – following up from Mindgame with three shorts showing what happened to the characters after their escape.
- Dæmos Rising (2004) – the story features Doctor Who monsters The Daemons and was written by David J. Howe, previously known for writing many successful nonfiction Doctor Who books, and for publishing Doctor Who fiction under the Telos Publishing imprint. Released as a DVD.
- White Witch of Devil's End (2017) – an independent drama starring Damaris Hayman as Olive Hawthorne, who made her original appearance in Doctor Who in the Jon Pertwee story The Dæmons. This DVD is a collection of monologue stories. Writers are Sam Stone, David J. Howe, Raven Dane, Suzanne Barbieri, Debbie Bennett and Jan Edwards; script editors Sam Stone, David Howe and Matt Fitton.
- Sil and the Devil Seeds of Arodor (2019) – an independent drama starring Nabil Shaban as Sil, reprising his role from the Colin Baker Doctor Who serials Vengeance on Varos and The Trial of a Time Lord: Mindwarp.
- Anomaly (TBA) – a follow-up story to Downtime and Dæmos Rising starring Tom Chapman as an adult Gordon Lethbridge-Stewart and Beverley Cressman reprising her role as Kate Stewart.
