= Cold Blood (TV series) =

British television crime drama series (2005–2008)

- Genre: Crime drama
- Written by: Tom Needham
- Directed by: Stuart Orme; Suri Krishnama
- Starring: Matthew Kelly; Jemma Redgrave; John Hannah; Ace Bhatti; David Calder; Pauline Quirke; Paul Gabriel
- Country of origin: United Kingdom
- Original language: English
- No. of series: 3
- No. of episodes: 5

Production
- Executive producers: Kieran Roberts; Carolyn Reynolds
- Producer: Ian White
- Running time: 90 minutes
- Production company: ITV Studios

Original release
- Network: ITV
- Release: 19 October 2005 – 3 January 2008

Cold Blood is a television series first broadcast on 19 October 2005, on ITV. Three series of the show were broadcast. The series stars Matthew Kelly as Brian Wicklow, a notorious serial killer who assists the police with investigations into murders and serial offenders. The series also features John Hannah as Jake Osborne and Jemma Redgrave as Detective Sergeant Eve Granger.

Three official series of the show were produced: two stand-alone feature-length episodes and one final series comprising three individual stories. The show ceased production in 2007 following declining viewing figures. The final episode was broadcast on 3 January 2008.

== Cast ==
- Matthew Kelly as Brian Wicklow
- Jemma Redgrave as DS Eve Granger
- Claudia Perrins as Young Eve Granger
- John Hannah as Jake Osbourne
- Ace Bhatti as DC Ajay Roychowdry
- David Calder as Professor Robert Kerr (Series 1—2)
- Pauline Quirke as DCI Hazel Norton (Series 2—3)
- Paul Gabriel as PC Neil Doyle

== Episodes ==
Series	Episodes	Originally released	
Series	Episodes	First released	Last released
1	1	19 October 2005	
2	1	5 March 2007	
3	3	20 June 2007	3 January 2008

=== Series 1 (2005) ===
No. overall	No. in series	Title	Directed by	Written by	Original release date	Viewers (millions)
1	1	"Cold Blood"	Stuart Orme	Tom Needham	19 October 2005	7.10
DS Eve Granger goes in search of answers as to the whereabouts of a young girl, Emma Foley, who disappeared some years previously - and could have become the ninth and final victim of serial killer Brian Wicklow.

=== Series 2 (2007) ===
No. overall	No. in series	Title	Directed by	Written by	Original release date	Viewers (millions)
2	1	"Cold Blood II"	Stuart Orme	Tom Needham	5 March 2007	6.12
DS Eve Granger finds herself back on the trail of serial killer Brian Wicklow when one of his fellow inmates is found dead in his cell, carrying evidence which indicates that Wicklow is the killer. But has he been framed?

=== Series 3 (2007–2008) ===
No. overall	No. in series	Title	Directed by	Written by	Original release date	Viewers (millions)
3	1	"Interference"	Suri Krishnama	Tom Needham	20 June 2007	4.38
DS Granger turns to Brian Wicklow for help whilst investigating a murder supposedly committed by a young boy with learning difficulties, which has been overturned on appeal. But when Wicklow is stabbed, Granger suspects he is playing games with her.
4	2	"Dead and Buried"	Suri Krishnama	Tom Needham	27 June 2007	4.54
DS Granger's relationship with Jake Osbourne is threatened when she investigates the murder of an Army corporal, who is shot dead during an exercise involving no live ammunition. Does Jake hold vital information?
5	3	"The Last Hurrah"	Stuart Orme	Tom Needham	3 January 2008	3.98
DS Granger comes face to face with Brian Wicklow once more when a young boy named Jake Osbourne is abducted from a shopping centre - and not one for believing in coincidence, discovers that Wicklow's sister is involved in the kidnap.
