= Nabil Shaban =

Jordanian-British actor and writer (1953–2025)

- نبيل شعبان
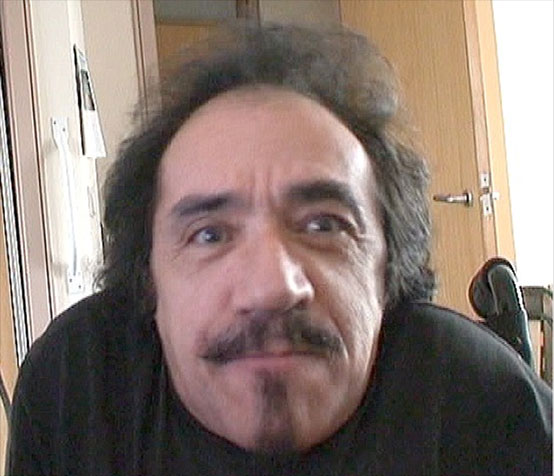
- Born: Nabil Shaban Moher Noghai; 12 February 1953; Amman, Jordan
- Died: 25 October 2025 (aged 72); Edinburgh, Scotland
- Occupations: Actor, writer
- Notable work: Doctor Who
- Spouse: Marcela Krystkova (m. 2016)
- Children: 1

Nabil Shaban Moher Noghai (12 February 1953 – 25 October 2025) was a Jordanian-British actor and writer. He co-founded the theatre group Graeae, which promotes disabled performers. On stage, he featured in several National Theatre productions. On television, he was best known for his role as the reptilian villain Sil in Doctor Who, appearing in two 1980s serials opposite Colin Baker's Sixth Doctor and reprising the role in two Big Finish audio dramas and a 2019 direct-to-video film, Sil and the Devil Seeds of Arodor.

== Life and career ==
Shaban was born in Amman, Jordan on 12 February 1953, with brittle bone disease osteogenesis imperfecta. He was sent to England for medical care, where he grew up in a series of hospitals and residential homes. He studied at the University of Surrey in the late 1970s and contributed to the Students' Union newspaper "Bare Facts". With Richard Tomlinson, he founded the Graeae Theatre Company in 1980, incentivised by drama schools refusing admission to budding actors based on disability. In 1997, Shaban was awarded an honorary doctorate by the university for services in the promotion of Disability Arts.

One of his most memorable television roles was that of the reptilian alien Sil in the BBC science fiction television series Doctor Who. Shaban played Sil in two serials: Vengeance on Varos (1985) and Mindwarp (1986), and created Sil's laugh. He reprised the role in the Big Finish audio dramas Mission to Magnus (2009) and Antidote to Oblivion (2013), both again written by Philip Martin. Shaban again played Sil in 2019 in Reeltime Pictures' web series production of Sil and the Devil Seeds of Arodor (2019), again written by Philip Martin.

He appeared in several films, including Born of Fire (1987), City of Joy (1992), Derek Jarman's Wittgenstein (1993), Gaias børn (1998), and Children of Men (2006), and has also worked as part of the Crass Collective. He made his National Theatre debut in 1998, playing father Rashid in an adaptation of Salman Rushdie's Haroun and the Sea of Stories. He subsequently appeared in several more NT productions, portraying the Roman emperor Constantius II in Ibsen's Emperor and Galilean (2011) and the Boyg in David Hare's Peter Gynt (2019). He played Hamlet for the Cleveland Theatre Company, where his performance involved using a rapier to pick his toe nails.

In 2003 he made a television documentary titled The Strangest Viking (part of Channel 4's Secret History series), in which Shaban explored the possibility that Viking chieftain Ivar the Boneless may have had osteogenesis imperfecta, the same condition he himself has. Shaban has also published a trilogy of Ivarr the Boneless screenplays on Kindle, representing the Viking chieftain as a disabled Danish prince with brittle bones and unable to walk.

Shaban was nominated Best Actor in Scottish theatre in 2005, by the Critics' Awards for Theatre in Scotland (CATS), for his role as Mack the Knife in Bertolt Brecht's Threepenny Opera, a Theatre Workshop (Edinburgh) production. Shaban lost out to rival nominee David Tennant, who was about to become the Tenth Doctor in Doctor Who.

His play The First To Go premièred in May 2008, produced by Edinburgh's Benchtours Theatre Company in association with Sirius Pictures. It opened at the Lyceum Theatre in Edinburgh on 23 May and toured to the Tron Theatre, Glasgow; the Byre Theatre, St Andrews and Lawrence Batley Theatre, Huddersfield.

He married Marcela Krystkova, in 2016. He had a son, Zenyel Shaban-Rogers, through a previous relationship.

Shaban died on 25 October 2025, at the age of 72. The Times' obituary noted: "Shaban's achievement was that he liberated himself through his sheer bloody-minded refusal to allow his disability, or anything else, to shackle him."

== Credits ==
=== Documentaries ===
- Co-wrote and presented "The Skin Horse", 1984 Channel Four
- Co-wrote and presented "The Fifth Gospel", 1990 BBC TV
- Presented "Rejects and Super Crips", Channel Four
- Presented "Children of Gaia", 1997, Milton Media, Denmark
- Writer, producer, director, host "The Alien Who Lived in the Sheds", 1997, BBC TV
- Associate producer and presenter "The Strangest Viking", 2003, Channel Four
- Researcher, co-writer and presenter "Return of the Star People", 2003, Zentropa, Denmark.

=== Drama ===
- Ben Gunn, "Walter", 1982, Channel Four
- Sil, Doctor Who, 1985–86, BBC TV
- Bill, Raspberry Ripple, 1988, BBC TV
- The Emperor, 1988, BBC TV
- Charlie aka God, Billy's Christmas Angels, 1988
- Iranian Nights, 1989, Channel Four
- Tom, Deptford Graffiti, Channel 4, 1991
- Alan, Skallagrig, 1994 BBC TV
- South of the Border BBC TV
- Inmates, BBC TV
- Lawyer, Sorry About Last Night, 1995 BBC TV

=== Radio, audio ===
- Benn Gunn in "Treasure Island" BBC Radio 4, 1994
- Jaturi in "The Ramayan" BBC Radio 3, 1994
- "Pie in the Sky", BBC Radio 4, 1995
- Firdaus Kanga in "Trying to Grow", BBC Radio 4, 1995
- Danda in "Tales of the Great Unwashed", 2005, Resonance FM
- Sil in "Doctor Who: Mission to Magnus”, Big Finish Audio, 2009
- Sil in “Doctor Who: Antidote to Oblivion”, Big Finish Audio, 2013

=== Feature films ===
- Born of Fire, 1987
- City of Joy, 1992
- Age of Treason, 1993
- Wittgenstein, 1993
- Slave of Dreams, 1995
- Children of Men, 2007
- Trouble Sleeping, 2008
- Morticia, 2009
- Sil and the Devil Seeds of Arodor, 2019

=== Producer, director, writer ===
- Another World (purchased by BBC TV), 1995
- The Alien who lived in the Sheds, BBC TV, 1997 (won 2 awards)
- The Skin Horse (won Royal Television Society Award, Emmy Award)
- Reports Action Appeal, Granada TV (won the Co-operative Society TV Award)
- Gandhi; an Inspiration, BBC Radio World Service, 1983
- Telephone Dummies, BBC TV drama, 1984
- The Fifth Gospel, BBC TV Everyman documentary, 1990
- King of the Incurables (screenplay), 1990
- Circus Nightmare (screenplay), 1991
- Another World, funded by Arts Council of England, 1995
- D.A.R.E., Theatre Workshop, 1996–97
- The First To Go, Graeae Theatre, 1996
- The Inheritance (screenplay), BFI, 1997
- The Alien who lived in the Sheds, BBC TV, 1997
- I am the Walrus (one actor stage play), Theatre Workshop, 2001
- Crip Triptych (music drama documentary), 2006
- Morticia (film drama), 2009
