= Dæmos Rising =

2004 Doctor Who spinoff film

- Cover of the DVD release

Production
- Directed by: Keith Barnfather
- Written by: David J. Howe
- Produced by: Keith Barnfather
- Running time: 1 episode, 53 mins.
- First broadcast: 14 March 2004 (release date)

Chronology
← Preceded by Downtime	Followed by → —

Dæmos Rising is a direct-to-DVD spin-off of the long-running British science fiction television series Doctor Who. It was released direct-to-video and produced by the independent production company Reeltime Pictures. It is a sequel to the Third Doctor serial The Dæmons and the 1995 Reeltime video Downtime and is also a tie-in to Telos Publishing's Time Hunter range of books, another Doctor Who spin-off.

The DVD was also released as a Limited Edition which included an inlay autographed by Beverley Cressman (Kate Lethbridge-Stewart), Miles Richardson (Douglas Cavendish), Andrew Wisher (The Ghost), Alistair Lock (Composer), David J. Howe (Writer) and Keith Barnfather (Producer/Director). Reeltime Pictures Limited also distributed for BBV (Bill and Ben Video).

The film received overall positive reviews from critics, such as Michael Syme.

== Synopsis ==
Kate Lethbridge-Stewart responds to a message from ex-UNIT operative Douglas Cavendish to investigate a haunting.

Arriving at Cavendish's isolated cottage, she faces a demonic power her father had previously battled. Summoned by a future tyranny, a Dæmon is set to return to Earth. It is up to Kate and Cavendish to save the planet and its future.

== Continuity ==
- Kate has heard enough stories of UNIT to not simply dismiss Cavendish's claims out of hand, but is still surprised and dubious, implying that she has not yet begun her UNIT career. This is further implied by the fact that she has not yet dropped "Lethbridge-" from her name.
- Cavendish refers to UNIT having a top secret storehouse of alien technology in the suburbs of London, and that it contained crates of shop-window mannequins (i.e., Autons). The warehouse and its crated Autons were depicted in 1997's Auton. The warehouse would be later identified as the "Black Archive" and depicted in Enemy of the Bane before being relocated under the Tower of London before the events of The Day of the Doctor.
- Among the UNIT relics which Kate finds in Cavendish's garden shed is a Cyberman breastplate.
- Kate is physically duplicated in an attempt to dupe Cavendish. She is again duplicated in The Day of the Doctor.
- Kate refers to her son, Gordon / "Gordy", who was introduced in Downtime, and whom Kate gave her father's middle name.
- Kate's father, Brigadier Lethbridge-Stewart, battled a Dæmon and the Master with the Third Doctor and Jo Grant in The Dæmons.
- In the repeated mentions of Kate's father - including a recitation of his post-nominals by Cavendish—his eventual knighthood is never referred to, implying that he was created Sir Alistair sometime after this story.
- A close-up of a calendar and Cavendish's exposition reveal the dates of the story as 30 and 31 October 2003.

== Cast ==
- Kate Lethbridge-Stewart - Beverley Cressman
- Douglas Cavendish - Miles Richardson
- The Ghost - Andrew Wisher
- Time Sensitive - Amanda Evans
- Priests - Andy Delafield, Christian James, Stefano Rossini, Bevis Taylor
- Dæmon voice - Alistair Lock
- Narrator - Ian Richardson

== Soundtrack release ==
Dæmos Rising - The Music

Soundtrack album by Alistair Lock
- Released: 14 March 2004
- Genre: Soundtrack
- Length: 37 min.
- Label: Reeltime Pictures

Music from this video composed by Alistair Lock was released on CD by Reeltime in March 2004.

=== Track listing ===
All tracks are written by Alistair Lock.

No.	Title	Length
1.	"Prologue"
2.	"Into The Woods"
3.	"The Statue"
4.	"The Only One"
5.	"The Book"
6.	"Incantation"
7.	"Manifestation"
8.	"Under The Stairs"
9.	"Ghost Story"
11.	"Seduction"
12.	"The Dæmon"
13.	"Broken Vessel"
14.	"Epilogue"

== Reception ==
Dylan Rees heavily praised the film in Downtime - The Lost Years of Doctor Who, calling it "a fitting finale to the direct-to-video spin-off saga", with praise for the premise and accessibility. Digital Spy called the film a, "creepy, Hammer-inspired horror".

== In print ==
Dæmos Rising
- Author: David J. Howe
- Cover artist: Andrew-Mark Thompson
- Publisher: Telos Publishing
- Publication date: 13 August 2019
- Pages: 138
- ISBN: 978-1-84583-977-2

A novelisation written by David J. Howe was published 13 August 2019 by Telos Publishing
