= David J. Howe =

British historian and writer

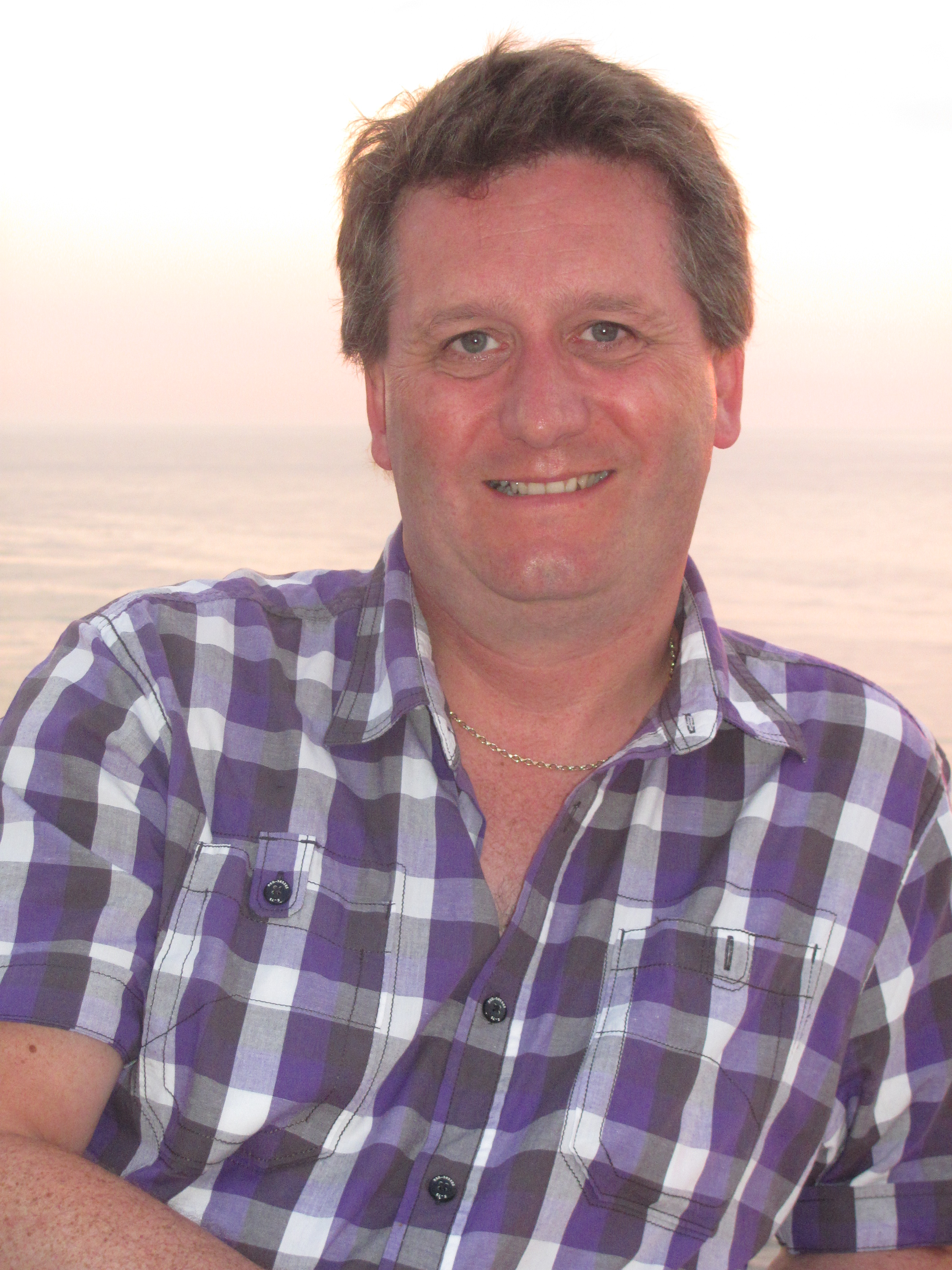
- Born: 24 August 1961 (age 65)
- Occupations: Writer; journalist; publisher; media historian
- Spouse: Samantha Lee Howe (m. 2015)
- Writing career
- Language: English
- Subjects: Doctor Who, horror
- Website: www.howeswho.co.uk

David J. Howe is a British writer, journalist, publisher, and media historian.

== Biography ==
David Howe was born on 24 August 1961 and established himself (in the early 1980s) as an authoritative media historian through writing articles for fanzines (notably The Frame) and other publications. In the early 1990s, he began to write the first in-depth critical texts of the British television series Doctor Who, and, as a result, has become closely associated with the show's history. He has written or co-written over thirty titles about the show, and continues to be involved with a variety of publications, often acting as consultant or reviewer.

In particular, Howe collaborated on some of the key texts in Virgin Publishing's range of Doctor Who reference works, including the three Decades books (with Stephen James Walker and Mark Stammers), considered to be some of the most in-depth works about the production history of the show. The same authors followed these with guide books (Doctor Who: The Handbook volumes 1 through 7 from 1992 to 1997) which covered the individual tenures of each Doctor in turn.

Howe and Stephen James Walker set up the publishing house Telos Publishing in 2000. The first publication under the Telos name was the first edition of Howe's Transcendental Toybox, written by Howe and Arnold T. Blumberg. (A later edition was described by the BBC's Doctor Who website as a "definitive collector's guide to Doctor Who merchandise".) Telos' second publication was a collection of tie-in fiction to the Channel 5 horror series Urban Gothic. Telos published Doctor Who novellas from 2001 to 2004, when BBC Worldwide declined to renew its license. Telos continues to publish non-Doctor Who works and unofficial Doctor Who reference works, including The Handbook, collecting the previously written Virgin Publishing guide books Doctor Who The Handbook in one volume in 2005, and the 2003 book The Television Companion (by Howe and Walker, and previously released as Doctor Who: The Television Companion in 1998 by BBC Publishing; the BBC Doctor Who website described it as the "definitive guide to Doctor Who"). In 2007–2008, Howe also served as the editor for Time's Champion, an independent Doctor Who novel based on Craig Hinton's final unpublished novel and completed by his friend Chris McKeon, which features the Sixth Doctor and the Valeyard.

Howe also wrote Dæmos Rising, an original film directed by Keith Barnfarther. He also wrote a story for the first Virgin Decalog short story collection, his only piece of licensed Doctor Who fiction to be published. He continues to work as co-director of Telos Publishing, which has expanded to publish a wide range of classic and new science fiction stories. In 2011 Howe published talespinning, a collection of short fiction, including several horror stories, Doctor Who fiction and drabbles.

Howe also has one of the largest collections of Doctor Who merchandise in the world. His collection was featured in the television programme Collectors Lot and on a special Doctor Who edition of Antiques Roadshow.

Aside from his Doctor Who work, Howe was the reviews' editor for the horror film magazine Shivers from 1994 to 2008 when it ceased publication. He was also a contributing editor to Starburst magazine from 1984 to 2001, and edited the book reviews column for that magazine for sixteen years. Howe has also contributed reviews, articles and interviews to publications including Fear, Dreamwatch, Infinity, The Stage, The Dark Side, Doctor Who Magazine, The Guardian, Film Review, SFX, Sci-Fi Entertainment, Collectors' Gazette, Death Ray, Doctor Who Insider and the Oxford Dictionary of National Biography. Howe edited the British Fantasy Society's bi-monthly newsletter from 1992 to 1995, and was the chair of that organisation from September 2010 to October 2011.

== Selected bibliography ==
- Doctor Who The Sixties (hardback, co-written with Stephen James Walker & Mark Stammers, 1992, Virgin Publishing. Paperback published 1993)
- Doctor Who The Seventies (hardback, co-written with Walker and Stammers, 1994, Virgin Publishing. Paperback published 1995)
- Doctor Who The Eighties (hardback, co-written with Walker and Stammers, 1996, Virgin Publishing. Paperback published 1997)
- Doctor Who The Handbook: The Fourth Doctor (paperback, co-written with Walker & Stammers, 1992, Virgin Publishing)
- Doctor Who The Handbook: The Sixth Doctor (paperback, co-written with Walker & Stammers, 1993, Virgin Publishing)
- Doctor Who The Handbook: The First Doctor (paperback, co-written with Walker & Stammers, 1994, Virgin Publishing)
- Doctor Who The Handbook: The Fifth Doctor (paperback, co-written with Walker, 1995, Virgin Publishing)
- Doctor Who The Handbook: The Third Doctor (paperback, co-written with Walker, 1996, Virgin Publishing)
- Doctor Who The Handbook: The Second Doctor (paperback, co-written with Walker & Stammers, 1997 Virgin Publishing)
- Doctor Who The Handbook: The Seventh Doctor (paperback, co-written with Walker, 1998 Virgin Publishing)
- Doctor Who: Drabble Who (hardback, co-edited with David Wake, 1993, Beccon Publications – collection of 100 short pieces of Doctor Who-related fiction and verse published for charity)
- Doctor Who: Timeframe – The Illustrated History (hardback, 1993, Virgin Publishing – The official 30th anniversary of Doctor Who book. Paperback published 1994)
- Doctor Who: Companions (hardback, co-written with Stammers, 1995, Virgin Publishing. Paperback published 1996)
- Text and photograph co-ordination for Doctor Who 1996 Diary (hardback, 1995 Mallon Publishing, Australia)
- Reflections: The Fantasy Art of Stephen Bradbury (text, limp-back, 1996, Paper Tiger). See, Stephen Bradbury (artist)
- Doctor Who TX File (text for filofax insert book, 1996, BBC Publishing)
- Doctor Who: I Am The Doctor (hardback, co-written with Jon Pertwee, 1996, Virgin Publishing – Jon Pertwee's Doctor Who autobiography)
- Doctor Who: A Book of Monsters (hardback, 1997, BBC Publishing)
- Doctor Who: The Television Companion (paperback, co-written with Walker, 1998, BBC Publishing)
- Howe’s Transcendental Toybox: The Unauthorised Guide to Doctor Who Collectibles (paperback, co-written with Arnold T Blumberg, 2000, Telos Publishing)
- The Television Companion: The Unofficial and Unauthorised Guide to Doctor Who (paperback/hardback, co-written with Walker, 2003, Telos Publishing)
- Howe’s Transcendental Toybox: Second Edition: The Unauthorised Guide to Doctor Who Collectibles (paperback, co-written with Arnold T Blumberg, 2003, Telos Publishing)
- Howe’s Transcendental Toybox: 2003 Update Edition (paperback, co-written with Arnold T Blumberg, 2004, Telos Publishing)
- The Handbook: The Unofficial and Unauthorised Guide to the Production of Doctor Who (paperback/hardback, co-written with Walker & Stammers, 2005, Telos Publishing)
- The Target Book: A History of the Target Doctor Who Books (co-written with Tim Neal, paperback, 2007, Telos Publishing)
- talespinning (paperback, 2011, Telos Publishing)
