= Jemma Redgrave =

British actress (born 1965)

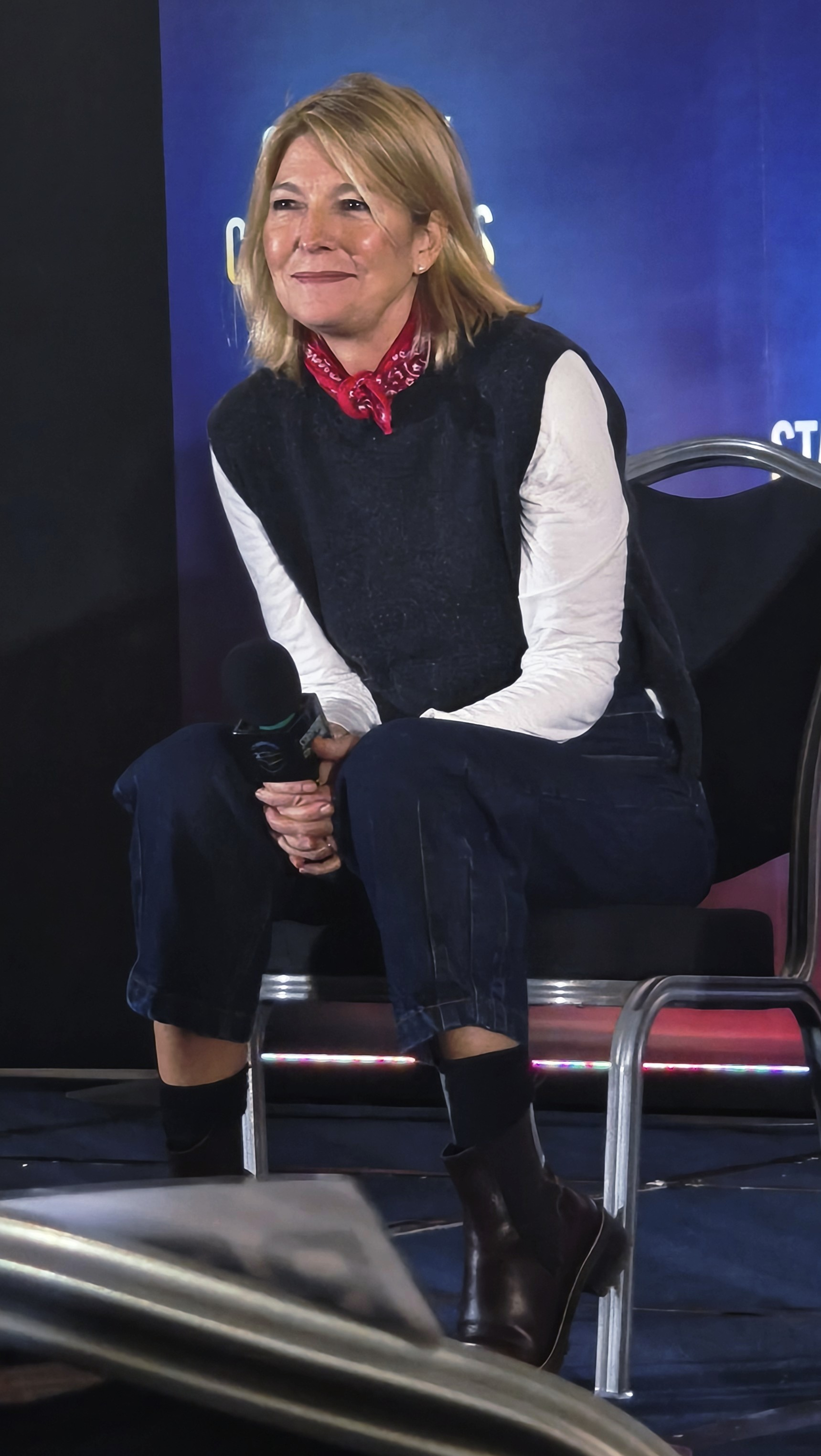
- Redgrave at Flux con Birmingham, March
- Born: Jemima Rebecca Redgrave; 14 January 1965 (age 61); London, England
- Education: London Academy of Music and Dramatic Art
- Occupation: Actress
- Years active: 1986–present
- Known for: Bramwell; Doctor Who
- Spouse: Tim Owen (m. 1992; div. 2020)
- Children: 2
- Father: Corin Redgrave
- Family: Redgrave

Jemima Rebecca "Jemma" Redgrave (born 14 January 1965) is an English actress, and a member of the Redgrave family. She is best known for playing Dr Eleanor Bramwell in Bramwell (1995–1998), Kate Lethbridge-Stewart in Doctor Who (2012–2015, 2021–2025) and its spin-off The War Between the Land and the Sea (2025), and Bernie Wolfe in Holby City (2016–2018, 2021–2022). As well as television, she has appeared on stage and film, starring as Evie Wilcox in Howards End.

== Early life ==
Redgrave was born in London on 14 January 1965, she is the daughter of actor Corin Redgrave and his first wife, Deirdre Hamilton-Hill, a former fashion model. They divorced when Jemma was nine. As a child, she attended the Godolphin and Latymer school in Hammersmith. She then enrolled at the London Academy of Music and Dramatic Art at the age of 18.

== Career ==
=== Stage ===
After graduation, Redgrave landed a succession of stage acting roles: in the 1988 stage production of Strindberg's Easter; in Lady Windermere's Fan in Belfast, Northern Ireland; as Emily in Thornton Wilder's Our Town; as Irina in a 1990 revival of Anton Chekhov's The Three Sisters in London's West End with her aunts Vanessa Redgrave and Lynn Redgrave; in 1993 in Alexander Griboyedov's Chatsky at the Almeida Theatre, London; and in A Midsummer Night's Dream in 2001 at the Albery Theatre, later the Noël Coward Theatre, London, playing Titania.

In 2010, she appeared in New York's Public Theater in The Great Game: Afghanistan which featured seven hours of on-stage acting. Redgrave appeared in four of the twelve plays. In 2012, she appeared alongside Ben Chaplin in Roger Michell's production of Farewell to the Theatre at the Hampstead Theatre, followed by starring roles in Donkeys' Years (2014) and An Ideal Husband (2016).

In 2018, Redgrave appeared in another Roger Michell production, appearing again alongside Ben Chaplin, this time in Joe Penhall's Mood Music at The Old Vic.

=== Television ===
She has appeared in many roles on British television, including leading actor roles as the eponymous Dr Eleanor Bramwell in four series of ITV's Bramwell and as D.S. Eve Granger in Cold Blood. Redgrave also appeared as Eleanor in Roger Michell's The Buddha of Suburbia: a four-part adaptation of the novel of the same name by Hanif Kureishi and with a soundtrack written and performed specifically for the production by David Bowie.

Other prominent roles have included Francesca Rochester in Judge John Deed and Dee Stanton in Like Father, Like Son. In 2007, she portrayed Lady Bertram in Mansfield Park and Sophie Wall in Waking the Dead, followed by a 2009 appearance in the series, Unforgiven, written by Sally Wainwright. In 2013, she also appeared as Doctor Zoe Evans in the BBC One drama series Frankie.

From 2016 to 2018, Redgrave played former RAMC surgeon Major Berenice Wolfe in the popular BBC medical drama Holby City. In 2019, she joined the cast of ITV's Grantchester as Amelia, the mother of the show's lead character, the Rev. Will Davenport.

On 31 August 2021, she made a surprise return to Holby City as Bernie Wolfe.

==== Doctor Who ====
In 2012, Redgrave was cast in the long-running science-fiction programme Doctor Who as Kate Lethbridge-Stewart, daughter of recurring character Brigadier Alistair Gordon Lethbridge-Stewart, who featured in the series' original 1963–1989 run. First appearing in "The Power of Three" (2012) with the Eleventh Doctor (Matt Smith), Kate is the commander-in-chief of the fictional military organisation UNIT, a role previously occupied by her father before his retirement. The character returned in the fiftieth anniversary special, "The Day of the Doctor" (2013), which was simulcast on television and in cinemas across the world in 94 countries, earning a Guinness World Record for the world's largest ever simulcast of a TV drama.

Kate would go on to become a recurring character in Doctor Who, with Redgrave reprising the role in episodes with the Twelfth (Peter Capaldi), Thirteenth (Jodie Whittaker), Fourteenth (David Tennant) and Fifteenth (Ncuti Gatwa) Doctors, as well as the 2025 spin-off series, The War Between the Land and the Sea.

Additionally, Redgrave began headlining the Big Finish audio drama spin-off UNIT: The New Series as Kate alongside Ingrid Oliver as Osgood, whom Redgrave appeared on-screen with multiple times in Doctor Who, and would go on to play Kate in other spin-off audio plays. Regrave also featured as Kate in a promo video for Doctor Who: Time Fracture, an immersive experience that began running in London in April 2021.

== Personal life ==
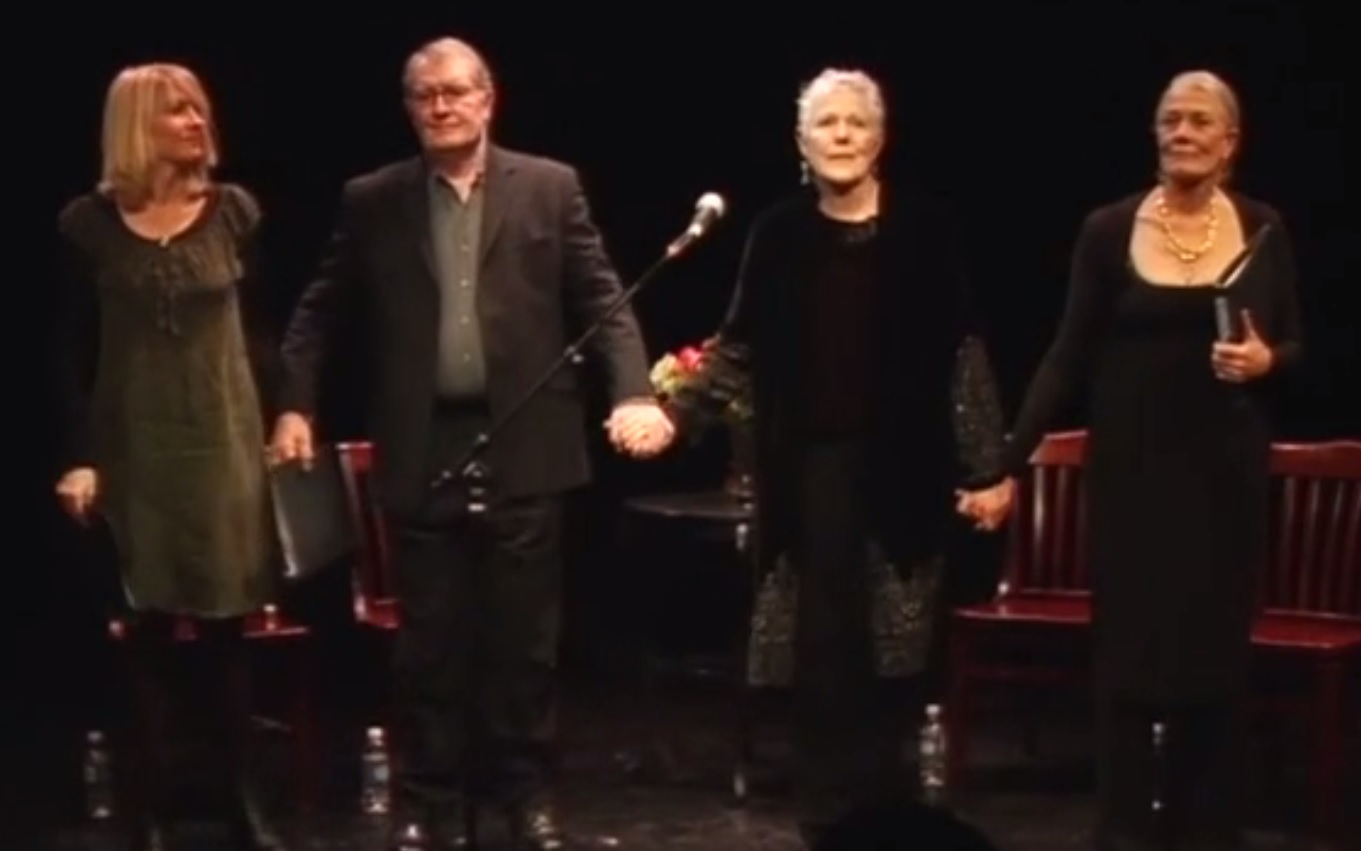
Jemma Redgrave, with her father, Corin, and aunts, Lynn and Vanessa, at 'Poems from Guantánamo', 2007.

Redgrave married Tim Owen, a barrister at Matrix Chambers, in 1992. They had a son, Gabriel, in 1994. The couple separated from 1997 to October 1998. They reconciled, however, and had another son, Alfie, in 2000. They have since divorced. She has a brother, Luke Redgrave, who is a camera operator, and two half-brothers, Arden and Harvey Redgrave. Her mother died in 1997 and her father died in 2010.

She is the granddaughter of Sir Michael Redgrave and Rachel Kempson, niece of actresses Vanessa Redgrave and Lynn Redgrave, and cousin of Joely Richardson, Carlo Nero, and Natasha Richardson. Her step-mother is the actress Kika Markham.

== Filmography ==
Key
†	Denotes films that have not yet been released

=== Film ===
Year	Title	Role	Director	Notes
1988	Dream Demon	Diana	Harley Cokeliss	
1992	Howards End	Evie Wilcox	James Ivory	
1994	One Night Stand	Kate	Bill Britten	Short film
1994	Power and Lovers	Emily	Aldo Lado	
1998	The Acid House	Jenny	Paul McGuigan	
2003	I'll Be There	Rebecca Edmonds	Craig Ferguson	
2005	Lassie	Daisy	Charles Sturridge	
2007	Mansfield Park	Lady Bertram	Iain B. MacDonald	
2016	Love & Friendship	Lady DeCourcy	Whit Stillman	
2016	Chubby Funny	Bereaved Woman	Harry Michell	
2021	Barnes' People	Dr. Rosa Hamilton	Peter Barnes	
2023	Red, White & Royal Blue	Narration (voice)	Matthew López	
2024	The Beekeeper	President Jessica Danforth	David Ayer	
2027	The Beekeeper 2	President Jessica Danforth	Timo Tjahjanto	

=== Television ===
Year	Title	Role	Notes
1988	Tales of the Unexpected	Violette Charbonneau	Episode: "A Time to Die"
1990	The Real Charlotte	Pamela Dysart	Miniseries
1991	All Good Things	Elaine Wilson	Miniseries
1991	Performance	Caroline Coon	Episode: "The Trials of Oz"
1993	Diana: Her True Story	Carolyn Bartholomew	TV film
1993	The Buddha of Suburbia	Eleanor	1 episode
1995–1998	Bramwell	Dr. Eleanor Bramwell	Main role (27 episodes)
1998	Mosley	Cimmie Curzon	Recurring role (4 episodes)
2000	Blue Murder	Gale	TV film
2000	Cry Wolf	Dr. Jocelyn Wolf	1 episode
2000	Fish	Joanna Morgan	Main role (6 episodes)
2000	Bramwell V	Dr. Eleanor Bramwell	
2001	High Stakes	Anna Foster	Episode: "The Do-Gooders"
2001	Judge John Deed	Francesca Rochester	2 episodes
2002	Judge John Deed	Francesca Rochester	Episode: "Nobody's Fool"
2002	The Swap	Jen Forrester	2 episodes
2002	My Family	Dr. Connor	Episode: "Shrink Rap"
2004	Amnesia	Jenna Dean	2 episodes
2004	The Inspector Lynley Mysteries	Grace Finnegan	Episode: "If Wishes Were Horses"
2004	The Grid	MI6 Agent Emily Tuthill	TV miniseries
2005	Tom Brown's Schooldays	Mary Arnold	TV film
2005	Like Father Like Son	Dee Stanton	2 episodes
2005	Cold Blood	Eve Granger	TV film
2006	Lewis	Trudi Griffon	TV film
2007	Waking the Dead	Sophie Wall	2 episodes
2007	Cold Blood 2	Eve Granger	TV film
2007	Mansfield Park	Lady Bertram	TV film
2007	The Relief of Belsen	Jean McFarlane	TV film
2007–2008	Cold Blood	Eve Granger	3 episodes
2008	Agatha Christie's Marple: Murder Is Easy	Jessie Humbleby	TV film
2009	Unforgiven	Rachel Belcombe	Main role
2009	Heston's Feasts	Herself	Heston's Victorian Feast
2010	Law & Order: UK	Helena Marsden	Episode: "Shaken"
2012–2015, 2021–2025	Doctor Who	Kate Lethbridge-Stewart	Recurring role (16 episodes)
2013	Frankie	Dr. Zoe Evans	Main role (6 episodes)
2014	Dracula	Minerva Westenra	2 episodes
2014	Inspector George Gently	Jennifer Bing	Episode: "Gently With Honour"
2015	Churchill: 100 Days That Saved Britain	Clementine Churchill	
2016–2018, 2021–2022	Holby City	Bernie Wolfe	Main role (67 episodes)
2018	Midsomer Murders	Dr Juno Starling	Episode “Drawing Dead”
2019–2020	Grantchester	Amelia Davenport	Recurring role (5 episodes)
2020, 2022–2023	Silent Witness	DI Jill Raymond	5 episodes
2025	The War Between the Land and the Sea	Kate Lethbridge-Stewart	Lead role; 5 episodes

== Theatre credits ==
=== Theatre ===
Year	Title	Role	Theatre	Director
1986	Lady Windermere's Fan	Lady Windermere	Lyric Theatre, Belfast	Richard Digby Day
1986	What the Butler Saw	Geraldine	Lyric Theatre, Belfast	Richard Digby Day
1986	Miss Julie	Miss Julie	UK Tour	Laurence Boswell
1988	Easter	Eleanora	Haymarket Theatre (Leicester)	David Leveaux
1988	Panorama	Geraldine	King's Head Theatre	Penny Churns
1988	School for Scandal	Lady Teazle	Bristol Old Vic	Les Waters
1988	An Enemy of the People	Petra	Playhouse Theatre	David Thacker
1990	Seven Years	Clarissa	Royal Court Theatre	
1990	Three Sisters	Irina	Queen's Theatre	Robert Sturua
1991	Our Town	Emily	Shaftesbury Theatre	Robert Ackerman
1991	As You Like It	Rosalind	Greenwich Theatre	Robert Carson
1992	Cyrano de Bergerac	Roxanne	Greenwich Theatre	Matthew Francis
1993	Chatsky	Sophie	Almeida Theatre & UK Tour	Jonathan Kent
1998	Major Barbara	Major Barbara	Piccadilly Theatre	Peter Hall
2001	A Midsummer Night's Dream	Titania	Noël Coward Theatre	Matthew Francis
2004	Misconceptions	Linda	UK Tour	Tim Carroll
2008	The Cherry Orchard	Varya	Chichester Festival Theatre	Phillip Franks
2009–2010	The Great Game: Afghanistan	Various roles	Tricycle Theatre & Washington/Broadway	Indhu Rubasingham
2012	Farewell to the Theatre	Dorothy	Hampstead Theatre	Roger Michell
2014	Donkeys' Years	Lady Driver	Rose Theatre, Kingston	Lisa Spirling
2014	An Ideal Husband	Mrs. Cheveley	Chichester Festival Theatre	Rachel Kavanaugh
2018	Mood Music	Vanessa	The Old Vic	Roger Michell
2019	Weimar Connections	Poesie	Cadogan Hall	with the Bournemouth Symphony Orchestra
2020	Hansard (rehearsed reading)	Diana	Stephen Joseph Theatre	Paul Robinson
2023	Octopolis	George	Hampstead Theatre	Ed Madden
2026	Springwood	Eleanor Roosevelt	Hampstead Theatre	Richard Nelson
