= Miles Richardson =

British actor (born 1963)

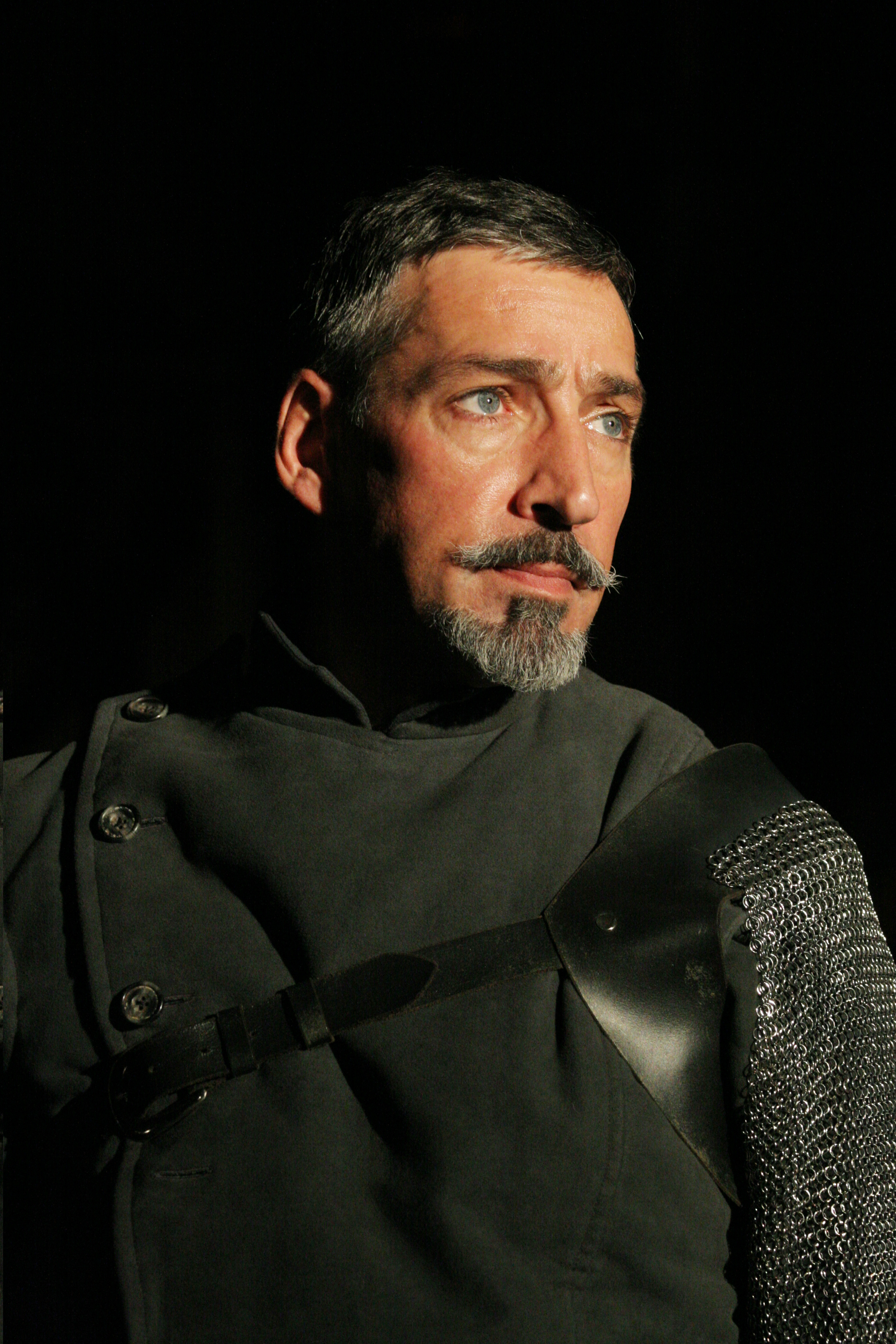
- Richardson as the Duke of Exeter in the Royal Shakespeare Company's production of Henry V
- Born: 15 July 1963 (age 62); London, England
- Occupation: Actor
- Years active: 1981-present
- Spouse: Beverley Cressman (m. 1994; div. 2009)
- Children: 2
- Father: Ian Richardson

Miles Richardson (born 15 July 1963) is a British actor.

== Early life ==
Richardson was born in London to parents Ian Richardson and Maroussia Frank, both founding members of The Royal Shakespeare Company. His father was from Edinburgh and his maternal great grandfather was the Russian philosopher Semyon Lyudvigovich Frank.

He was educated and brought up in London, Stratford-upon-Avon and New York. He graduated from Arts Educational Schools in 1982. He subsequently obtained a post graduate degree from Warwick University in 2008, sponsored by The Royal Shakespeare Company.

== Theatre work ==
=== Repertory theatre ===
Richardson has worked in repertory theatre. He started his career with The TyneWear Theatre in 1982 in Newcastle performing in 9 productions in 9 months. Other repertory work includes stints at Birmingham, York, Pitlochry, Clwyd, Leeds & Nottingham. He has toured extensively in the UK and abroad. Notably James Graham's This House, Barney Norris's adaptation of Kazuo Ishiguro's The Remains of the Day. He was in Sir Derek Jacobi's productions of Richard II and Richard III. He appeared at The Kennedy Center in Lulu starring Anna Friel. In 2009 he went to Japan with Gregory Doran to appear in a joint UK/Japan production Anjin: The Shogun and the English Samurai, telling the story of William Adams, the first Englishman in Japan. The production came to the Sadler's Wells Theatre in 2013.

=== West End ===
His first appearance in the West End in 1983, was as "Fowler" in Another Country with Colin Firth at the Queens Theatre, now The Gielgud Theatre. He appeared in multiple roles in Ken Hill's adaptation of H G Well's "The Invisible Man" transferring from The Theatre Royal Stratford East to The Vaudeville Theatre and The Comedy Theatre, now The Harold Pinter. From November 2013 until March 2014, he appeared as "Juror 10" in Twelve Angry Men at the Garrick Theatre. From September 2014, he appeared as James Reiss in King Charles III at the Wyndhams Theatre. In 2015 the show won the Olivier Award for Best New Play. Due to Tim Pigott-Smith sustaining a broken collarbone, he took over the lead role of Charles for 5 weeks until Pigott-Smith returned. Having played Charles I on film and Charles II on both film and stage, he is probably the only actor to perform the hat trick of playing all three King Charles'. His most recent appearances in London were in two plays by Agatha Christie: Witness for the Prosecution and The Mousetrap.

=== Off West End ===
He has appeared in numerous fringe shows in London, most notably Johnson In Love BAC, Journeys End With Samuel West and Kris Marshall at The Kings Head. The Lovers, Playing Sinatra and Candida with Paula Wilcox at The New End Theatre. Dear Brutus and Moment Of Truth at The Southwark Playhouse and Round About Hogarth at The Tabard Theatre.

=== Royal Shakespeare Company ===
From 2003 to 2008, he was a member of the Royal Shakespeare Company appearing in All's Well That Ends Well with Judi Dench, A Midsummer Night's Dream and As You Like It. He had worked for the company in the 1970s as a child actor.

He took part in the RSC's Histories Ensemble playing in Henry IV, Part 1 and 2, Henry V, Henry VI, Part 1, 2, and 3 and Richard III which won three Olivier Awards in 2009 for Best Company Performance, Best Revival and Best Costume Design.

He returned in 2015 to play Voltore in Volpone with Henry Goodman. In all he has appeared in over 80 plays.

== Audio drama ==
Richardson has performed a number of roles for Big Finish Productions, most notably playing Irving Braxiatel since 2001.

== Film and television ==
His numerous credits include: FBI: International, Industry, The Canterville Ghost, Outlander, The Crown, Lucan, Titanic, three episodes of Midsomer Murders and four episodes of Doctors. He was Tony Slattery's butler in P's and Q's and Roger Moore's butler in his last film A Christmas Princess. He has worked as a voice artist, most notably as the young Peter O'Toole in Venus and, by contrast, playing the title role in the animated Life With Jesus.
