= List of monastic houses in Somerset =

Locations of monastic houses in Somerset

The following is a list of the monastic houses in Somerset, England.

Alien houses are included, as are smaller establishments such as cells and notable monastic granges (particularly those with resident monks), and also camerae of the military orders of monks (Knights Templar and Knights Hospitaller). Monastic hospitals are included where they had the status or function of an abbey, priory, or preceptor/commandery.

Abbreviations and key

Status of remains
Symbol	Status
None	Ruins
*	Current monastic function
^{+}	Current non-monastic ecclesiastic function (including remains incorporated into later structure)
^	Current non-ecclesiastic function (including remains incorporated into later structure) or redundant intact structure
^{$}	Remains limited to earthworks etc.
^{#}	No identifiable trace of the monastic foundation remains
^{~}	Exact site of monastic foundation unknown
^{≈}	Identification ambiguous or confused

Locations with names in italics indicate possible duplication (misidentification with another location) or non-existent foundations (either erroneous reference or proposed foundation never implemented) or ecclesiastical establishments with a monastic name but lacking actual monastic connection.

Trusteeship
EH	English Heritage
LT	Landmark Trust
NT	National Trust

Foundation	Image	Communities & provenance (Note: Communities & provenance shows the status and communities existing at each establishment, together with such dates as have been established as well as the fate of the establishment after dissolution, and the current status of the site.)	Formal name or dedication (Note: Formal name or dedication: shows the formal name of the establishment or the person in whose name the church is dedicated.) & alternative names (Note: Alternative names: some of the establishments have had alternative names over the course of time. In order to assist in text-searching, such alternatives in name or spelling have been provided.)	References (Note: References: presents links to online references to the particular establishment in addition to the general printed and online references given at the foot of this article. Establishments for which online references have not been specified are referred to within the printed references listed.) & location (Note: Location: provides a link to the geographical position of the site of the foundation where established. Where the location has been established the location is pinpointed (dependent on the available resolution of the map data), otherwise the general location is given in italic.)
Athelney Abbey ^{#}	Stone obelisk surrounded by railings set in green fields and trees	possible early hermitage or monastery founded c.878?; Benedictine? monks founded c.888 by King Alfred (possibly enlarging pre-existing establishment); Benedictine monks (re)founded c.960; dissolved 8 February 1539; granted to John Clayton 1544/5; now on private land, the site of church is marked by a monument erected 1801	The Abbey of Saint Peter, Saint Paul and Saint Athelwine, Athelney	Athelney; 51°03′35″N 2°56′02″W
Bablew Grange		Cluniac monks grange and chapel (Note: Bablew: given as priory by Tanner, Notitia Monastica) dependent on Montacute	Bablew Priory	Tintinhull; 50°58′22″N 2°43′15″W
Banwell Monastery		Saxon monastery granted to Asser by Alfred c.888; St Andrew's Church, Banwell, possibly on site (alternative possible sites)		51°19′42″N 2°51′44″W (alleged); 51°19′19″N 2°51′58″W (possible); 51°19′41″N 2°51′48″W (possible)
Barlynch Priory		Augustinian Canons Regular founded between 1154 and 1189 (between 1174(?) and 1220), reputedly by William de Say; dissolved before July 1537; granted to Sir John Wallop 1538/9; remains now on site of Barlynch Farm; now in ownership of Working for Wildlife	The Priory Church of Saint Nicholas, Barlinch ____________________; Barlinch Priory	Brompton Regis; 51°03′00″N 3°31′47″W
Barrow Gurney Nunnery		Benedictine nuns founded c.1200 by ___ Gurney, Lord of Stoke Hamden; dissolved 1536; granted to William Clerke 1544/5; incorporated into Barrow Court	The Blessed Virgin Mary and St Edmund, King and Martyr ____________________; Minchin Barrow Priory; Minchinbarrow Priory; Bearwe Priory; Borrow Gurney Priory	Barrow Gurney; 51°24′21″N 2°40′19″W
Bath Abbey ^{+}	Large floodlight stone building with tower	Saxon nuns founded c.676, reputedly by King Osric, who granted land to Bertana, abbess; destroyed and rebuilt several times; monks refounded before 758; secular? 775; Benedictine? monks refounded 963/4; episcopal diocesan cathedral 1090; dissolved 1539; granted to Humphrey Colles 1542/3; conventual church now in parochial use	The Abbey Church of Saint Peter and Saint Paul, Bath	Bath, Somerset; 51°22′53″N 2°21′30″W
Bedminster Monastery	Historical county location. See entry under List of monastic houses in Bristol			
Brent Cell ^{~}		Benedictine monks purported cell dependent on Glastonbury	East Brent Cell	51°15′45″N 2°56′30″W (very approx)
Bridgwater Greyfriars ^		Franciscan Friars (under the Custody of Bristol) founded c.1245 by William Bruer (Briwere); church consecrated 1445 (after rebuilt/extended); dissolved 13 September 1538	Bridge Water Friary	Bridgwater; 51°07′33″N 3°00′25″W
Bristol Austin Friars	Historical county location. See entry under List of monastic houses in Bristol			
Bristol Eremites Friars	Historical county location. See entry under List of monastic houses in Bristol			
Bristol Preceptory	Historical county location. See entry under List of monastic houses in Bristol			
Bruton Abbey		Benedictine monks abbey(?) founded c.1005 by Algar, Earl of Cornwall; dissolved before 1086(?); Augustinian Canons Regular refounded 1127-1135 by William de Mohun raised to abbey status 1511; dissolved 1 April 1539; granted to Maurice Berkely 1545/6		Bruton; 51°06′31″N 2°27′02″W
Buckland Priory		Augustinian Canons Regular founded c.1166 by William de Arlegh (Erlegh), Lord of Durston; dissolved c.1180; Knights Hospitaller preceptory refounded c.1180; dissolved 1433 together with priory of Sisters of St John of Jerusalem (see immediately below); refounded c.1180; dissolved after 1500; Augustinian Canons Regular priory or hospital; refounded after 1500; dissolved 10 February 1539; granted to Alexander Popham and William Halley 1544/5; site now occupied by Buckland Farm	John the Baptist ____________________; Minchin Buckland Preceptory; Buckland Sororum	Durston; 51°03′07″N 3°00′23″W
Buckland Sisters of St John Priory		Sisters of St John of Jerusalem transferred from Carbrooke, Clanfield, Gosford, Hampton, Hogshaw, Shingay, Standon and Swingfield; refounded c.1180; together with Knights Hospitaller Preceptory on the site of former Augustinian Canons Regular priory (see immediately above); dissolved after 1500; Augustinian Canons Regular priory or hospital founded on site (see immediately above); site now occupied by Buckland Farm	St Mary and St Nicholas	Durston; 51°03′07″N 3°00′23″W
Burtle Priory		hermitage, endowed by William son of Godfrey of Eddington 1199; Augustinian Canons Regular priory cell dependent on Glastonbury 1267; refounded before 1270; independent from 1275; dissolved 1536; granted to John and James Bisse 1553/4: parochial church of St Philip and St James Church built on the site	The Holy Trinity, the Blessed Virgin Mary and St Stephen ____________________; Burtle Moor Priory; St Stephens Chapel, Sprauellissmede; Byrkley Priory; Burcle Priory; Bercle Priory; Brademers Priory	Burtle; 51°11′08″N 2°52′27″W
Cannington Priory		Benedictine nuns — from Dorset founded c.1138 by Robert de Courcey; transferred to Colwich, Staffordshire; converted into a mansion; reverted to nunnery; dissolved 1536; granted to Edward Rogers 1538/9; remains incorporated into Cannington Court, built on site	Canyngton Nunnery	Cannington, Somerset; 51°09′01″N 3°03′41″W
Charterhouse on Mendip		Carthusian monks grange (purported cell) dependent on Witham; granted Robert May 1544/5		
Cheddar Monastery		reference to community 978; called a minster		
Chewstoke Cell		cell(?) founded (?) by Elizabeth de Sancta Cruce; dissolved before 1500(?)	Holy Cross	
Clevedon Friary *		Franciscan Friars Minor extant	Friary and Parish of the Immaculate Conception	51°26′39″N 2°51′35″W
Cleeve Abbey	Long red brick building with grey roof.	Cistercian monks — from Revesby founded between 1186 and 1191, land granted by William de Roumare (Romara), Earl of Lincoln (building apparently begun by 1198 - 24 or 25 June 1198); dissolved 1536; granted to Thomas, Earl of Sussex 1541/2; (EH (Note: The current trustee of this site is English Heritage))	Vallis Florida; Clyve Abbey; Cliff Abbey	Washford/Old Cleeve; 51°09′19″N 3°21′53″W
Dodlinch Priory ^{~}		Augustinian Canons Regular — Victorine possibly initially dependent on Bristol; associated with the Victorine abbey at Bristol; founded c.1210 by William de Courtney; transferred to new site at Woodspring ?before 1226; dissolved 1230	Dodelyng Priory	
Downside Abbey * (Note: This site has a current monastic function.)	Ornate building with central tower. To the right is a stone building with green roof and to the left a new building with large glass windows.	Benedictine monks (community founded at Douai 1607); transferred from Douai founded 1814	The Abbey Church of Saint Gregory the Great, Downside, Stratton-on-Fosse	Stratton-on-the-Fosse; 51°15′14″N 2°29′37″W
Dunster Priory ^{+} (Note: This site has a current non-monastic ecclesiastic function.)		Benedictine monks dependent on Bath; founded c.1100 (after 1090) by William de Mohun; dissolved 1539; granted to Humphrey Colles 1542/3; church in parochial use as the Priory Church of St George	Priory Church of St George	Dunster; 51°10′56″N 3°26′45″W
Frome Monastery		Saxon (Benedictine?) monks — purportedly from Malmesbury; founded after 675 by St Aldhelm; dissolved before 690?		
Glastonbury Abbey		Saxon monks founded c.6th century(?); Benedictine? monks founded c.705; secular 9th century? Benedictine monks (re)founded(?) c.960; dissolved 15 November 1539; granted to Edward, Duke of Somerset 1547/8; granted to Sir Peter Carew 1558/9; ruins purchased by the Bath and Wells Diocesan Trust 1908; now in ownership of the registered charity Glastonbury Abbey Trust with public access	The Abbey Church of Saint Mary, Glastonbury	Glastonbury; 51°08′45″N 2°42′50″W
Green Ore Cell(?)		Benedictine monks 'cell of Glaston'; probable grange of Hinton Charterhouse	Green Oare	51°14′55″N 2°36′27″W
Haselbury Priory		hermitage to 1154; Augustinian Canons Regular; William fitz Walter began house — apparently not completed; possibly destroyed in the contests of the barons		
Hinton Priory		Carthusian monks (community founded 1222 at Hatherop, Gloucestershire 1222); transferred here May 1232; dissolved 1539; now in private ownership without public access	Hinton Charterhouse	Hinton Charterhouse; 51°19′53″N 2°19′11″W
Ilchester Blackfriars ^{#}		Dominican Friars founded between 1221 and 1260; dissolved 1538; demolished early 19th century		Ilchester; 51°00′02″N 2°41′05″W
Ilchester Nunnery		hospital founded c.1217-1220 by William Dennis (Dacus); Augustinian Canonesses refounded before 1281; dissolved before 1463	Whitehall Hospital of the Holy Trinity ____________________; Blanchesale Hospital; Whitehall Hospital	Ilchester; 51°00′09″N 2°40′58″W
Ilminster		possible Saxon minster; land granted to Muchelney by King Ine; no record of community		
Keynsham Abbey	Low stone walls in grass, surrounded by trees with a house in the dissolvedtance.	Augustinian Canons Regular founded c.1170 by William, Earl of Gloucester dissolved 1539; granted to Thomas Bridges, Esq 1552/3		Keynsham; 51°24′47″N 2°29′48″W
Kilve Chantry	Stone wall with window of ruined building.	founded 1329 by Simon de Furneaux; dissolved late 14th century damaged by fire in 1848		Kilve; 51°11′21″N 3°13′22″W
Langley Priory		uncertain order and foundation house of St Mary, brothers or canons, short-lived establishment 12th century		
Martock Priory		granted to Humphry Colles 1542/3		
Moorlynch Cell		Benedictine monks cell dependent on Glastonbury		
Montacute Priory		Cluniac monks founded between c.1078 and 1102 by William, Count of Mortain dissolved 1539; granted to Robert, Earl of Leicester 1573/4; remains now part of Abbey Farmhouse	Montecute; Mons Acutus	Montacute; 50°56′59″N 2°43′10″W
Muchelney Abbey	Stone building with square tower. In the foreground are low walls of the ruins amongst the grass.	Benedictine? monks founded before 693 traditionally by King Ine; destroyed in raids by the Danes(?)c.878 secular collegiate? founded 939 by King Athelstan; Benedictine monks founded c.950 (959); dissolved 3 January 1538; granted to Edward, Earl of Hertford 1537/8; (EH (Note: The current trustee of this site is English Heritage))	Michelney Abbey	Muchelney; 51°01′00″N 2°49′13″W
Pennard Minster		Saxon minster		
Pitminster		possible Saxon minster		
Potbury Priory		Augustinian Canons Regular possible priory dependent on Bristol — no record of cell		
Regil Grange		Cistercian monks grange? dependent on Flaxley; founded before 1200(?)		
Stavordale Priory		Augustinian Canons Regular — Vitorine founded before 1243 by a member of the Lovel family; merged with Taunton 1533; granted to John, Earl of Oxford 1544/5; conventual church converted into a private house, renovated and extended in 1905	Slaverdale Priory	Charlton Musgrove; 51°05′11″N 2°22′34″W
Steep Holme Cell		Augustinian Canons Regular cell dependent on Studley, Oxfordshire; founded before 1260; dissolved before 1300		
Stogursey Priory		Benedictine monks alien house: dependent on Lonlay 1183; founded 1100-07: church granted by William de Falaise and his wife Geva; granted to Eton College 1440; last prior left 1442	Stoke Courcy Priory	Stogursey; 51°10′52″N 3°08′27″W
Taunton Priory ^{#} (Note: There is no identifiable trace of the monastic foundation remains at this site.)		secular collegiate founded before 904; Augustinian Canons Regular founded c.1120 (c.1115) by William Giffard, Bishop of Winchester; dissolved 1539; granted to Mathew Colehurst 1544/5; part of remains now called 'Priory Barn'; converted into a cricket museum	The Priory Church of Saint Peter and Saint Paul, Taunton	Taunton; 51°01′05″N 3°05′54″W
Taunton Whitefriars		Carmelite Friars licence granted 1341; revoked 1343; house never established		
Templecombe Preceptory		Knights Templar granted by Serlo FitzOdo in 1185. founded c.1185 dissolved 1308–12; Knights Hospitaller granted 1312 dissolved 1539; granted to Richard Andrews and Leonard Chamberlayne	Combe Templariorum; Temple Comb Preceptory	Templecombe; 50°59′59″N 2°24′55″W
Witham Friary ^{+} (Note: This site has a current non-monastic ecclesiastic function.)		Carthusian monks founded 1178/9 (1180/1); dissolved 1539; granted to Ralph Hopton 1544/5; church now in parochial use	The Friary Church of the Blessed Virgin Mary, Witham The Parish Church of the Blessed Virgin Mary, Saint John Baptist and All Saints, Witham Friary (former lay brothers' church) ____________________; Witham Abbey; Witham Charterhouse; Selwood Friary	Witham Friary; 51°10′02″N 2°21′55″W
Woodspring Priory ^ (Note: This site has a current non-ecclesiastic function.)		Augustinian Canons Regular — Victorine (community founded at Dodlinch c.1210); transferred here before 1226; dissolved 1539; granted to William and John Lacy 1559/60; currently in use as an exhibuiltion centre for artwork; (LT (Note: The current trustee of this site is the Landmark Trust))	The Priory Church of the honour of the Holy Trinity, Saint Mary the Virgin and Saint Thomas the Martyr of Canterbury, Worspring ____________________; Worspring Priory	Weston-super-Mare; 51°23′26″N 2°56′42″W
Worminster		Saxon minster	Wormester	
Wyrall Nunnery		alleged early nunnery (Note: Wyrall Nunnery, considered legendary by W. Dugdale, Monasticon Anglicanum, Volume 4, p.1623)	St Peter ____________________; Wyrall Hill Nunnery	
Yenston Priory ^{#} (Note: No identifiable trace of the monastic foundation remains at this site.)		Benedictine monks alien house: cell or grange(?) dependent on St Sever; founded before c.1090 (before 1100) by Hugh d'Avranches, 1st Earl of Chester (Hugh Abrincis); mentioned in the reign of Edward I; doubtful it ever had status of priory; granted to Eton College c.1468; exchanged for other lands; held by Sir Thomas Bell by 1548; house possibly built on site 16th century; adjacent fields called 'Priory Plot' and 'Priors' possibly associated with the grange		Henstridge; 50°59′19″N 2°24′39″W or 50°59′15″N 2°24′52″W

== See also ==
- List of monastic houses in England
