= Ilchester (disambiguation) =

Ilchester is a village and civil parish in the county of Somerset, England.

Ilchester may also refer to:

United Kingdom

- Ilchester (UK Parliament constituency), a former constituency in Somerset
- Ilchester Cheese Company
- Earl of Ilchester, a title in the Peerage of Great Britain

United States

- Ilchester, Maryland, an unincorporated community near Baltimore

== See also ==
- Ilchester Friary
- Ilchester Museum
- Ilchester Nunnery
- Richard of Ilchester (died 1188), medieval English statesman and prelate
