= List of monastic houses in Bristol =

Locations of monastic houses in Bristol
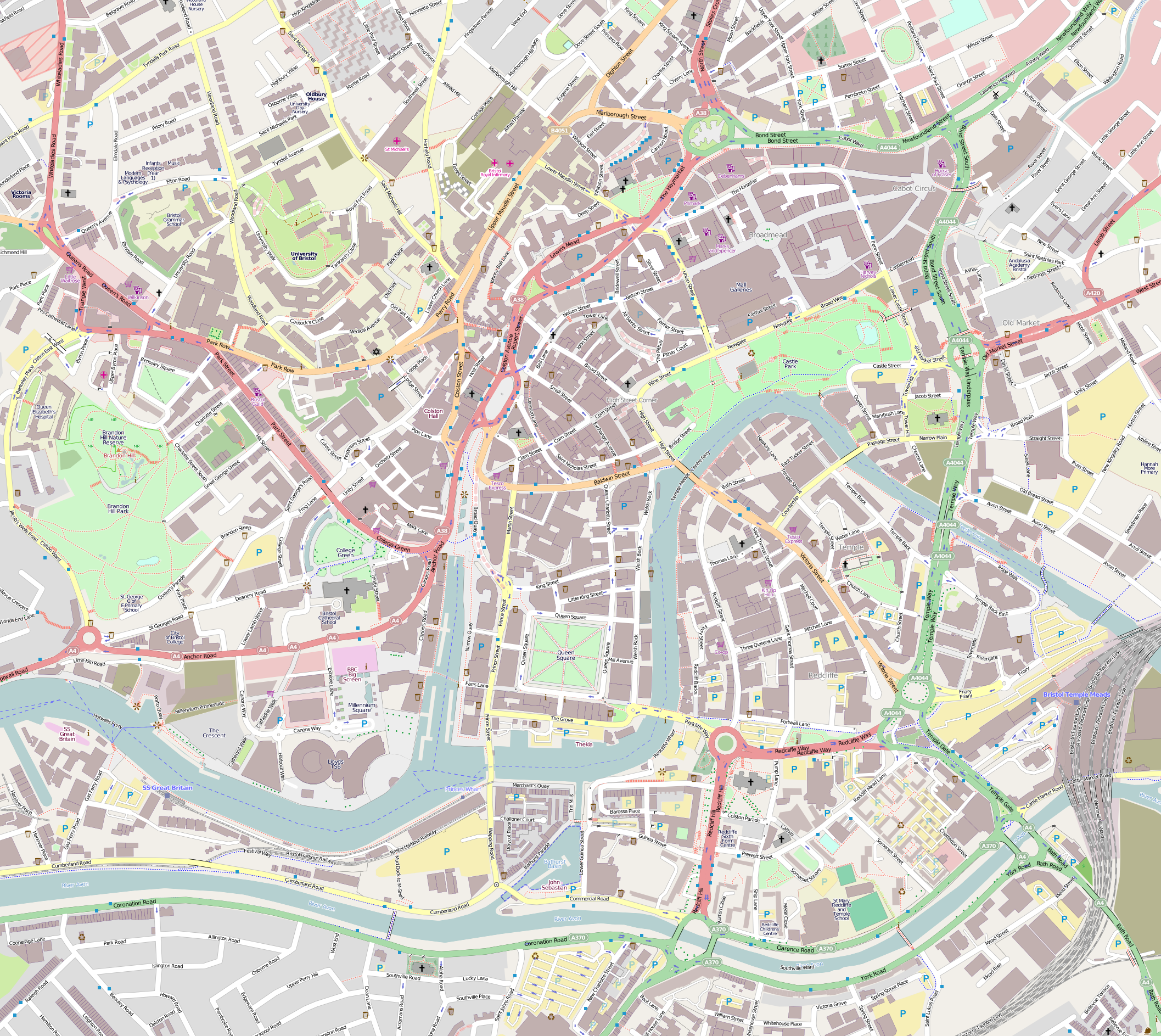
Locations of monastic houses in Central Bristol

This list of the monastic houses in Bristol includes abbeys, priories, friaries and other monastic religious houses in Bristol.

Alien houses are included, as are smaller establishments such as cells and notable monastic granges (particularly those with resident monks), and also camerae of the military orders of monks (Knights Templar and Knights Hospitaller). Monastic hospitals are included where they had the status or function of an abbey, priory, or preceptor/commandery.

Abbreviations and key

Status of remains
Symbol	Status
None	Ruins
*	Current monastic function
^{+}	Current non-monastic ecclesiastic function (including remains incorporated into later structure)
^	Current non-ecclesiastic function (including remains incorporated into later structure) or redundant intact structure
^{$}	Remains limited to earthworks etc.
^{#}	No identifiable trace of the monastic foundation remains
^{~}	Exact site of monastic foundation unknown
^{≈}	Identification ambiguous or confused

Locations with names in italics indicate possible duplication (misidentification with another location) or non-existent foundations (either erroneous reference or proposed foundation never implemented) or ecclesiastical establishments with a monastic name but lacking actual monastic connection.

Trusteeship
EH	English Heritage
LT	Landmark Trust
NT	National Trust

Foundation	Image	Communities and provenance (Note: Communities existing at each establishment, together with such dates as have been established as well as the fate of the establishment after dissolution, and the current status of the site.)	Formal name or dedication and alternative names	References and location
Bedminster Monastery		possible Saxon monastic or secular foundation parochial church of St John probably built on site, rebuilt 1854, destroyed by bombing in World War II		51°26′24″N 2°35′55″W (probable)
Bristol Austin Friars ^{#}		Augustinian Friars (under the Limit of Oxford) founded 1313 by Sir Simon and Sir William Montacute; vacation house for alien students 1362; dissolved September 1538; granted to Maurice Dennis c.1543		51°27′01″N 2°35′03″W
Bristol Blackfriars ^		Dominican Friars (under the Visitation of London) founded 1227/8 by Sir Maurice [de] Gaunt; dissolved 10 September 1528 (1538?); granted to William Chester; subsequently The Friars Quaker meeting house; then Bristol Register Office; currently in use as a restaurant		51°27′26″N 2°35′16″W
Bristol Eremites Friars ^{#}		Friars Eremites		51°26′52″N 2°35′10″W
Bristol Friars of the Sack ^{#}		Friars of the Sack founded before 1266; dissolved after 1286; friars had left before 1322, though church continued in use		51°27′17″N 2°35′54″W
Bristol Greyfriars ^{#}		Franciscan Friars Minor, Conventual (under the Custody of Bristol) founded before 1230/34; dissolved 10 September 1538; granted to Mayor and citizens of Bristol c.1541	Saint Francis	51°27′29″N 2°35′44″W
Bristol Whitefriars ^{#}		Carmelite Friars founded 1256/1267 by Edward, Prince of Wales (the future Edward I); dissolved 1538; site successively occupied by a mansion and a boys' school; site now occupied by Colston Hall	The Blessed Virgin Mary	51°27′17″N 2°35′54″W
St James's Priory, Bristol ^{+}		Benedictine monks founded 1120s, built by Robert, Earl of Gloucester, son of Henry I; dissolved 1539; granted to Henry Brayne c.1543; nave in parochial use 1374; fell into disuse 1980s; in custodianship of the Little Brothers of Nazareth since 1996	The Priory Church of Saint James, Bristol	51°27′31″N 2°35′35″W
Bristol — St Mary Magdalen Nunnery ^{#}		Augustinian Canonesses founded 1173 by Eva, widow of Robert Fitzharding; also given as Benedictine dissolved 1536; granted to Henry Brayne and John Marsh; King David Inn built on site	St Mary Magdalene	51°27′26″N 2°35′52″W
Bristol — St Philip's Priory		Benedictine monks founded c.900	The Church of Saint Philip and Saint Jacob, Bristol	51°27′18″N 2°35′06″W
Bristol — St Stephen's Priory		Benedictine monks recorded as a cell dependent on Glastonbury Abbey, Somerset		
Bristol Cathedral Abbey: St Augustine's Abbey, Bristol ^{+}		Augustinian Canons Regular — Victorine founded 1140-2 by Robert Fitzharding; first canons transferred from Shobdon Priory, Herefordshire (1120 or) 1148; dissolved 9 December 1539; episcopal diocesan cathedral founded 1542; extant	The Abbey Church of Saint Augustine of Canterbury, Bristol The Cathedral Church of the Holy and Undivided Trinity, Bristol	51°27′06″N 2°36′02″W
Bristol Preceptory		Knights Templar church built on site of templar church, now in ruins		51°27′08″N 2°35′12″W
Westbury Priory		Saxon minster, college of secular priests founded 716; granted to Worcester Cathedral 824; probably destroyed in Danish raids 9th century; Benedictine monks refounded c.963–964 by Bishop Oswald; 12 monks transferred to new site at Ramsey Abbey, Huntingdonshire 972; priory lapsed thereafter; refounded c.1093, cell dependent on Worcester; lapsed before c.1112; refounded 1125; college of secular priests 1194; parochial church built on site	The Priory Church of the Blessed Virgin Mary, Westbury on Trym ____________________; Westbury on Trym Priory; Westbury Minster	51°29′40″N 2°37′02″W

== See also ==
- List of monastic houses in England
