= Denys family =

The surname Denys was borne by at least three prominent mediaeval families seated in Gloucestershire, Somerset and Devon in southwest England between 1166 and 1641. It is not known if any relationship existed between these families. The surname Denys is just one of many variant spellings of the name: Denise, Le Deneis, Le Danies, le Deneys, and most recently Dennis, are some of the others.

The family of Denys was apparently of Danish origin, and was recorded in early Norman charters in French as le Deneys, meaning "The Dane", which was frequently Latinised by scribes as Dacus, being the adjectival form of Dacia, the mediaeval Latin for Denmark, thus "Danish".

== Denys of Gloucestershire ==
An early and influential west-country family named Denys seems to have originated in Gloucestershire in the 13th century and to have moved into Glamorgan, where it was resident at Waterton, before moving back to Gloucestershire c. 1380, where it was seated at Siston near Bristol until the late 16th century. This family's arms are the differenced arms of their apparent sometime feudal overlords the Cantilupes, three leopard's faces jessant-de-lys.

Several members of this branch of the family became High Sheriff of Gloucestershire. The first was Sir Gilbert Denys (c. 1350 – 1422); others included Maurice Denys (c. 1410 – 1466), Sir William Denys (1470–1533) and Henry Dennis (Feb 1594 – 26 June 1638).

== Denys of Somerset ==
Another possibly related 12th- and 13th-century Denys family held the manor of Sock Dennis near Ilchester, in Somerset, from the Beauchamp family, feudal barons of Hatch Beauchamp. White Hall Hospital in Ilchester was founded in about 1217–1220 by William Dacus/Le Deneis of Sock Dennis, following his gift of a house and other property. During the reigns of Henry II (1154-1189) and Richard I (1189-1199), the royal forest of Petherton Park, near Bridgwater in Somerset, was held from the crown by Osbert and William Dacus by grand serjeanty of being the king's Forester of Petherton. The Somerset Denys family seems to have died out soon after in the male line. No trace of their armorials has survived from which to make a link to other families of the same name.

== Denys of Devon ==
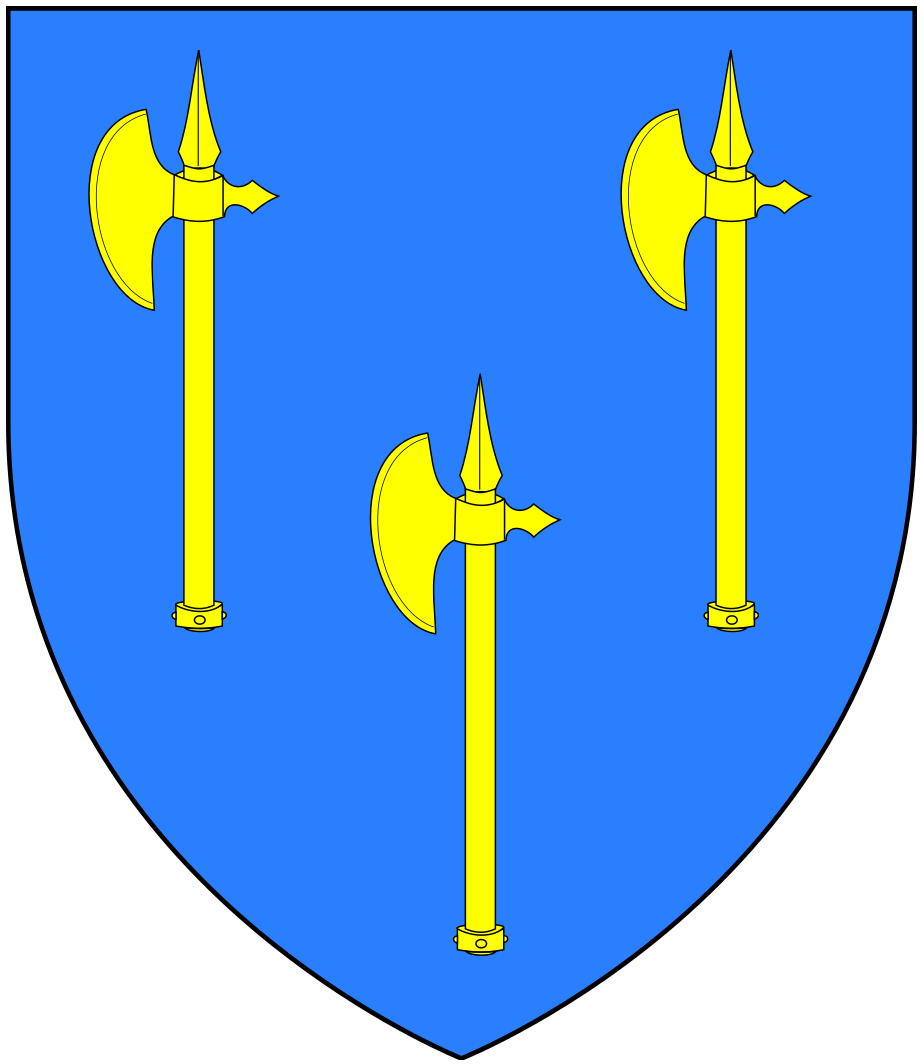
Arms of Denys of Orleigh: Azure, three Danish battle axes erect or,

Josceline le Deneys (whose first name was Latinised to Jollenus, Jellanus or Joscelinus) was recorded in the 1166 Cartae Baronum return submitted by Henry de Pomeroy, feudal baron of Berry Pomeroy in South Devon, as holding from him the manor of Pancrasweek, Black Torrington hundred, North Devon, and de Pomeroy himself held it from Tavistock Abbey. This Jollenus Dacus held Pancrasweek as one knight's fee on military feudal tenure. Orleigh formed a sub-manor of Pancrasweek, but was held by him under the non-military tenure of free socage, that is to say it was a heritable estate the service for which was monetary not military.

Dacus held two fees in total from de Pomeroy, as stated in his 1166 return, and the identity of these fees are revealed in the record of the holdings of his descendant Robert le Deneys in the feudal aid of 1285 which shows Pancrasweek forming one, Southwick in Germansweek and Manaton (14 miles north of Berry Pomeroy Castle) forming a half each. In 1285 however Robert le Deneys was holding these manors not from the de Pomeroy barons but from the heirs of Patrick de Chaworth, who was successor in title to Brewer, lord of the manor of Buckland Brewer amongst others, who had himself purchased them from de Pomeroy.

The arms adopted by the Devon family of this name at the start of the age of heraldry in about 1200 reflected their supposed origins: Azure, three Danish battle axes or, that is three golden axes on a blue background. A history of this family is contained in the Duchess of Cleveland's "Battle Abbey Roll", under "Denise".

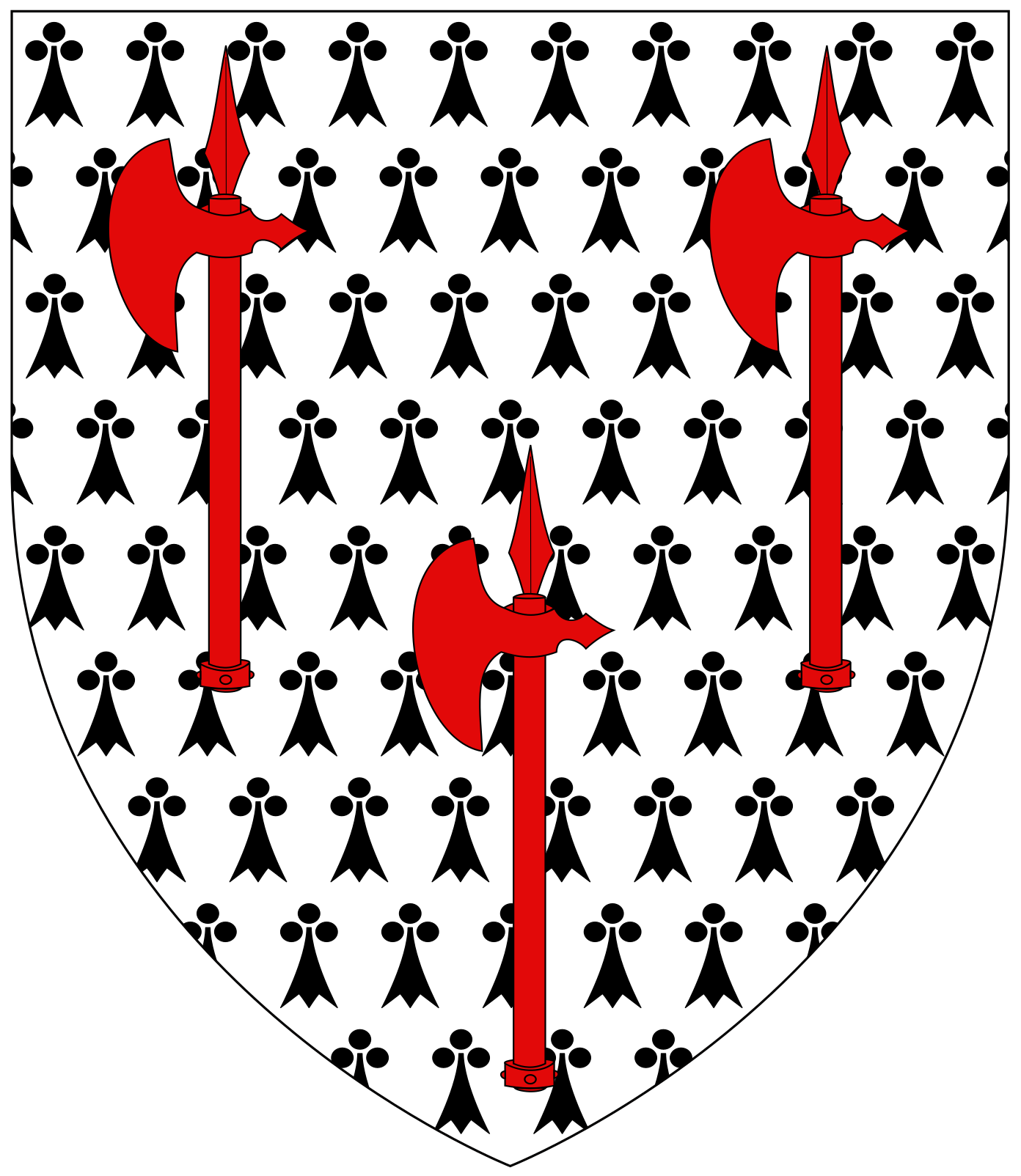
Arms of Denys of Holcombe Burnell & Bicton

A cadet branch of Dennis of Orleigh settled at Holcombe Burnell, 3 miles west of Exeter, and Bicton, 10 miles SE of that city, and bore the arms of Orleigh differenced: Ermine, three Danish battle axes gules (three red battle-axes on a white background with black ermine spots).

Robert le Deneys gave Orleigh to his younger son William, whose son John le Deneys was in possession in 1342 Richard Denys (died 1442), John's grandson, married Elizabeth Bowhay, daughter and heiress of Geoffrey Bowhay of Bowhay. In 1417 Orleigh was occupied by his wife's cousin, also called Elizabeth Bowhay, the daughter of John Bowhay and widow of Thomas Crydia. She was granted in 1417 by Edmund Stafford (died 1419), Bishop of Exeter, licence to have mass performed in her oratory at Orleigh.

Three generations of Denys's each named John followed Richard Denys, the last of whom, John Denys (died 1498) married Eleanor Gifford, daughter and co-heiress of Stephen Gifford of Theoborough. His son was William Denys (born 1472), who was followed by his son Nicholas and the latter's son John Denys (died 1584) who married Dorothy Monk, daughter and co-heiress of Anthony Monk of Potheridge. John settled the reversion of his manor of Farley in Petrockstowe onto the issue of his son William Denys (died 1605) in 1573 on the occasion of his marriage to Mary Vyell, daughter of William Vyell of Trevorder. William contributed £25 to the defences against the Spanish Armada in 1588. He died intestate. His son was Anthony Dennis (1585–1641), the last of the male line, whose monument can be seen in Buckland Brewer Church.

The heir of Denys of Holcombe Burnel and Bicton was the Rolle family of Stevenstone, which in the person of John Rolle, 1st Baron Rolle (died 1842), seated at Bicton House, was the largest landowner in Devon possessing some 55,000 acres, now represented by Baron Clinton.

=== Anthony Dennis (1585–1641) ===
Anthony Dennis of Orleigh married twice:

- Firstly to Elizabeth Wise, daughter of Thomas Wise of Sydenham. They had a son William (born 1611) and two daughters.
- Secondly to Gertrude Grenville, daughter of Sir Bernard Grenville, lord of the manor of Stowe, in Kilkhampton parish, Cornwall and of Bideford, the seaport 4 miles north of Orleigh. Sir Bernard was the son of the renowned Sir Richard Grenville (1542–1591), Captain of "The Revenge" which was lost heroically fighting the Spaniards in the Azores, and the father of the renowned Sir Bevil Grenville (1596–1643) killed in heroic circumstances at the Battle of Lansdowne leading Cornishmen, memorialized by Sir Bevil Grenville's Monument on Lansdowne Hill near Bath. Gertrude and Anthony had eight children, of whom only three infant daughters, aged between 8 and 14, survived their father as co-heiresses:
  - Mary Dennis, the eldest, married Sir Thomas Hampson, 2nd. Baronet (died 1670), of Taplow, Buckinghamshire.
  - Elizabeth Dennis (died 1664), married twice, firstly in 1643 to John Hern and secondly to William Alston of Strixton, Northamptonshire. A slab exists on the floor of the Orleigh Chapel showing the arms of Alston impaling Dennis, inscribed thus: "In memory of Elizabeth Alston, daughter of Anthony Dennis of Orleigh Esqr., the wife of William Alston of Strixton in the county of Northampton, Esqr., who in sure and certain assurance of a (?) life departed ye 4th of June 1664".
  - Gertrude Dennis, the youngest, married in 1664 Nicholas Glynne of Glynne in Cornwall.

In 1661 the three sisters conveyed jointly the manor of Orleigh to feoffees (i.e. trustees) who sold it in 1684 to the Bideford merchant John Davie (died 1710).

== Sources ==
- Rogers, W. H. (1938), "Buckland Brewer", reprinted 2000, Snetzler, M.F. (Ed.), Barcott, Buckland Brewer
