= Petherton Park =

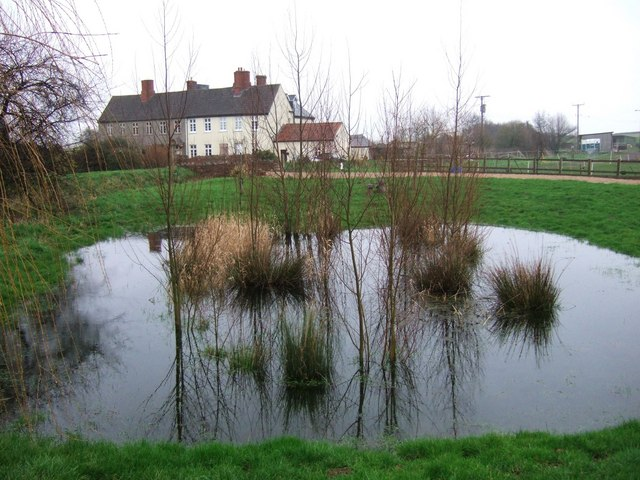
- Pond in front of Manor House Farm

- Location within Somerset
- 51°05′18″N 2°59′05″W
- Location: North Petherton, Somerset, England

History
- Built: 17th century

Listed Building – Grade II
- Official name: Petherton Park Farmhouse and Park Manorhouse
- Designated: 29 March 1963
- Reference no.: 1060171

Listed Building – Grade II
- Official name: Two pairs of gate piers on frontage of Petherton Park Farmhouse and Park Manorhouse
- Designated: 29 March 1963
- Reference no.: 1344640

Petherton Park (also known as North Petherton Park or Newton Park) was a Deer park around North Petherton within the English county of Somerset.

The origins are unclear but the area was part of an earlier Royal Forest stretching from the River Parrett to the Quantock Hills. According to the late 13th century Hundred Rolls, King Henry II of England (d. 1189) gave William of Wrotham lands at North Petherton. During the reigns of Henry II (1154–1189) and Richard I (1189–1199), the royal forest of Petherton Park, was held from the crown by Osbert and William Dacus by grand serjeanty of being the king's Forester of Petherton. William de Plessis, who died in 1274 was granted Petherton Park and it was inherited by his son Richard de Barbeflote or Plessis.

The park was the only part of the royal estate which had not been granted away from royal ownership by the end of the 13th century. From 1391 until his death in 1400 the poet Geoffrey Chaucer was one of the foresters. He was succeeded by his son Thomas Chaucer.

At various points during the 13th and 14th centuries, the park was the source of venison for royal feasts. The park was also a source of timber, which was granted by the king often to religious houses such as the Buckland Priory and the Friary and Nunnery in Ilchester. Between 1513 and 1535 Sir William Courtenay (d.1535) of Powderham, Devon was the keeper of North Petherton Park.

The park was visited by John Leland in 1538 who recorded that there were around 2000 deer in the park. Its extent was shown on the map of 1575 by Christopher Saxton and again in a map of 1610 by John Speed.

In 1583 the park was recorded as being owned by absentee landlords and falling into decline, although it was still a source of timber for sale. In 1584 part of the park was enclosed and leased. In 1638 the keeper Sir Thomas Wroth, of the Wroth baronets who had held the park since the reign of Elizabeth I, started to break up the park and by 1665 it had been divided into 11 different holdings, and by 1676 there were 15.

The Alfred Jewel, an Anglo-Saxon artefact made of enamel and quartz enclosed in gold, was discovered in the park in 1693, and is now one of the most popular exhibits at the Ashmolean Museum in Oxford. It has been dated from the late 9th century. It was made in the reign of Alfred the Great and is inscribed "AELFRED MEC HEHT GEWYRCAN", meaning 'Alfred ordered me made'. The jewel was once attached to a rod, probably of wood, at its base. After decades of scholarly discussion, it is now "generally accepted" that the jewel's function was to be the handle for a pointer stick for following words when reading a book. It is an exceptional and unusual example of Anglo-Saxon jewellery. There is a replica of the jewel in the Church of St Mary, North Petherton.

Maunsel House at North Newton, which was within the area of the earlier park, was built in the late 14th or early 15th century. Between 1648 and 1726 it was owned by the Bacon family who turned some the land into gardens, orchards and a fish pond.

The house which takes the name of Petherton Park was built in the 17th century. It is a Grade II listed building. It is now known as Petherton Park Farmhouse and Park Manorhouse and has been divided into two separate houses. The two storey building has an eleven bay front. Two gatepiers at the entry to the site are also listed.

== Bibliography ==
- Bond, James (1998). Somerset Parks and Gardens. Somerset Books. ISBN 0861834658.
- Greswell, William Henry Parr (1905). Forests and Deer Parks of the County of Somerset. Barnicott & Pearce, Athenaeum Press.
