= William Popley =

English mercer and landowner

William Popley (c. 1490 – c. 1575), was an English mercer and land owner, whose association with Thomas Cromwell, enabled him to take advantage of the opportunities presented by the dissolution of the monasteries to secure extensive landed estates.

== Origins ==
Popley was the son of a Bristol merchant, John Popley, mayor of the Staple in Bristol in the early years of Henry VIII, and was admitted to The Staple himself in 1511. In 1525 he had a share in a Bristol ship but he seems to have been a lawyer by training as he can be found acting in legal cases involving Bristol citizens, and he worked with Thomas More during his Lord Chancellorship. This combination of commercial connections and legal expertise made him suitable for minor diplomatic errands, such as acting as a courier to William Knight, the ambassador to the Netherlands. Early in his career he was investing in land; a will dated 1527 records that he had purchased the manor of Hinton Blewett (Som.) and he also had interests at Felton near Bristol. Three proceedings for debt contracted in the late 1520s suggest that cash flow was a problem at this stage in his career. He secured patrons among the local aristocracy including the Stafford family, holders of Thornbury Castle, Gloucestershire, the Nevill family, lords of the manor of Bedminster and Arthur Plantagenet, 1st Viscount Lisle, who had property in Bristol. His marriage to Katherine, daughter of Giles Basset of Uley will also have increased his range of contacts.

== Relationship with Thomas Cromwell ==
In the early 1520s Popley formed an association with Thomas Cromwell, who acted on Popley's behalf in London, and when Cromwell rose to prominence in the 1530s Popley became what has been described as Cromwell's "principal man of business". The fruits of patronage followed, such as the grant of the right of presentation to a prebend in Wells jointly made to Cromwell, Thomas Wriothesley and Popley. Above all he was well-placed to benefit from the Dissolution of the Monasteries. He was on hand to receive, for example, the moveable property and plate of the Austin Friars near Temple Gate in Bristol and the Franciscans in Lewin's Mead, and through his influence with Cromwell was eventually able to buy the Austin Friars. The relationship between the two men seems to have been cordial; in a letter of 1522 Popley asks to be remembered to Cromwell's wife and mother and when Popley returned to Bristol to recover from an illness in 1537 Cromwell told him to "do as he thought best for his health".

== Later career and death ==
After the fall of Cromwell Popley continued to be much involved in the land market, buying and selling property at Cirencester and Somerton, and he was leased the prebendal holding at Bitton. He also secured the lease of Llanthony Priory's lands in Wiltshire and was still investing in urban property in Broad St Bristol. Occasional references show him managing his property portfolio into the 1550s. By now in his sixties he also undertook legal commissions including a survey of the manor of Barton Regis, which had been sold by the crown in 1553, and he made a witness deposition about it in 1569. In the 1530s he had lived in Cirencester, moving in the 1540s to Chitterne in Wiltshire and the pardon roll of Elizabeth I reveals a series of residences: "late of Thornebury, late of Bytton, late of Chitterne All Saints, late of London, late of Bristoll". He was still alive in 1572, when he was acting on behalf of Edward Lord Stafford. The date of his death is unknown.
