= Church of Saint Mary, Kilve =

Church in Somerset, England

Church of Saint Mary
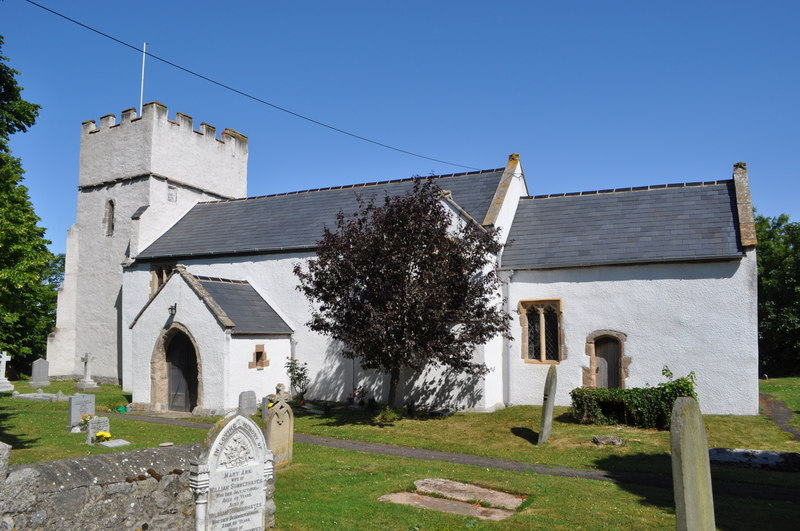

- Location within Somerset
- 51.188°N 3.2224°W
- Location: Kilve, Somerset, England

History
- Built: 14th century

Listed Building – Grade II*
- Official name: Church of Saint Mary
- Designated: 22 May 1969
- Reference no.: 1345709

The Anglican Church of St Mary in Kilve, Somerset, England was built in the 14th century. It is a Grade II* listed building.

== History ==
The first church on the site was most likely built around the 12th century if not sooner.

Parts of the 14th century church remain with additions in the 15th century and the tower is said to have been built sometime around 1636. The vestry was added in some time around 1876 and the whole church restored in 1913. Another extensive renovation was completed in 2006.

The church is noted for having a choir from Kilve Chantry until around the 15th century.

The parish of Kilve with Kilton and Lilstock is part of the Quantock Coast Benefice within the Diocese of Bath and Wells.

== Architecture ==
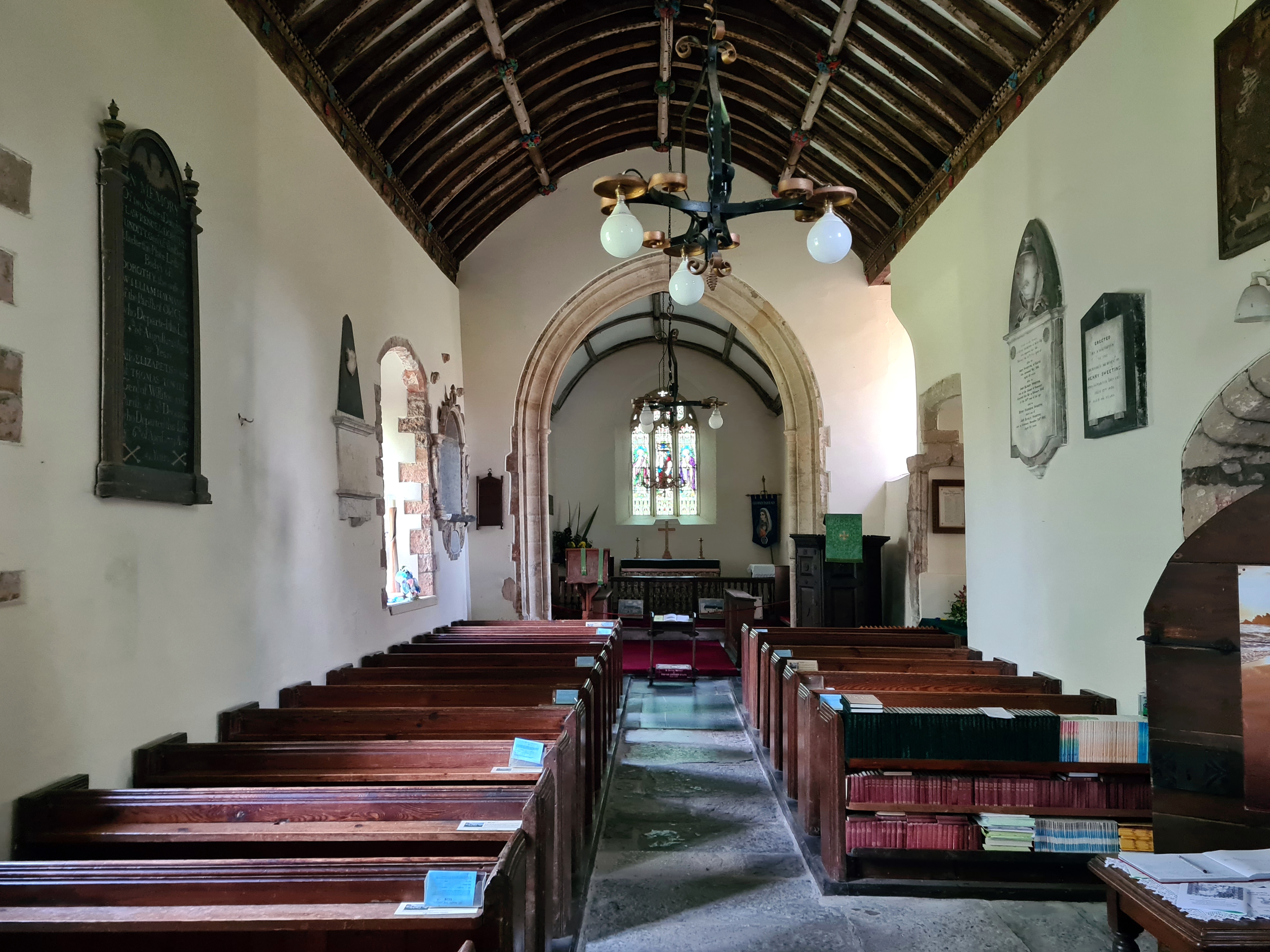
The interior of the Church of St Mary.

The blue lias stone building has a slate roof. It consists of a two-bay nave, chancel and vestry with a south porch. The two-stage west tower is supported by diagonal buttresses. There are two bells, the oldest of which was cast around 1500. The bells were housed in a separate thatched building until the construction of the tower.

The interior a 12th century font and a royal coat of arms from 1660. The chancel has a plastered barrel vault ceiling from the 15th century.

== See also ==
- List of ecclesiastical parishes in the Diocese of Bath and Wells
