= Oil Retort House =

Grade II listed building in Kilve, Somerset

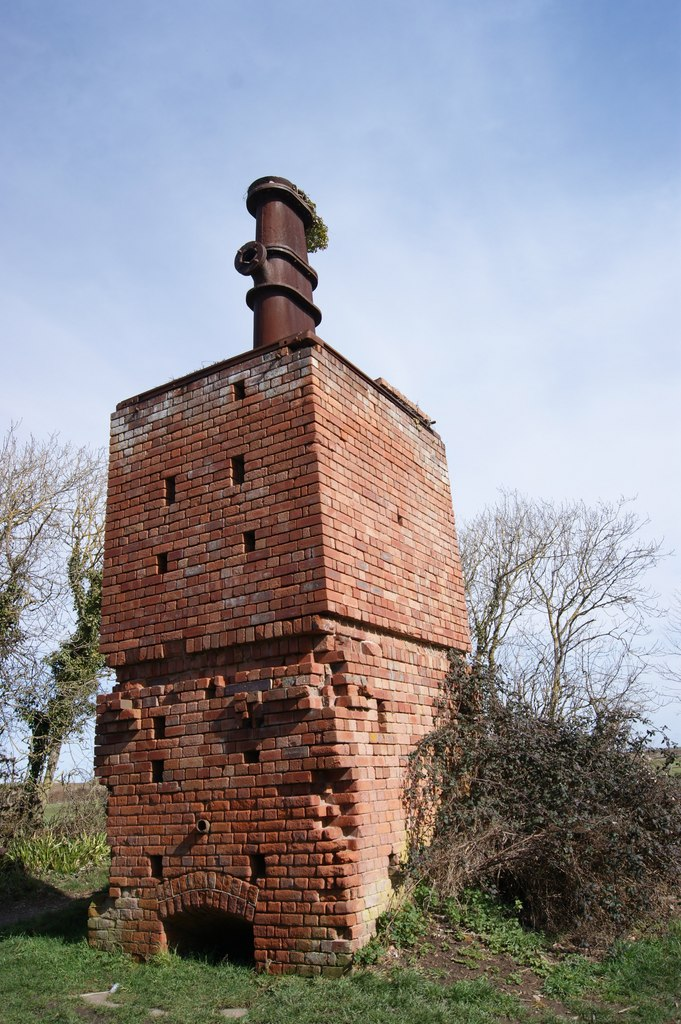
- Oil Retort in March 2010

- Map of Oil Retort House within Somerset
- 51°11′29″N 3°13′32″W
- Location: Kilve, Somerset, United Kingdom

Listed Building – Grade II

Oil Retort House is a Grade II listed building in Kilve, Somerset, United Kingdom.

== History ==
In 1924, the Shalime Company was formed to exploit shale oil and blue lias limestone in Kilve, Somerset. A retort was constructed in anticipation of this exploitation. However, financial backing for the project failed to materialise.

Oil Retort House was listed on 16 November 1984.
