= Ilchester Town Hall =

Municipal building in Ilchester, Somerset, England

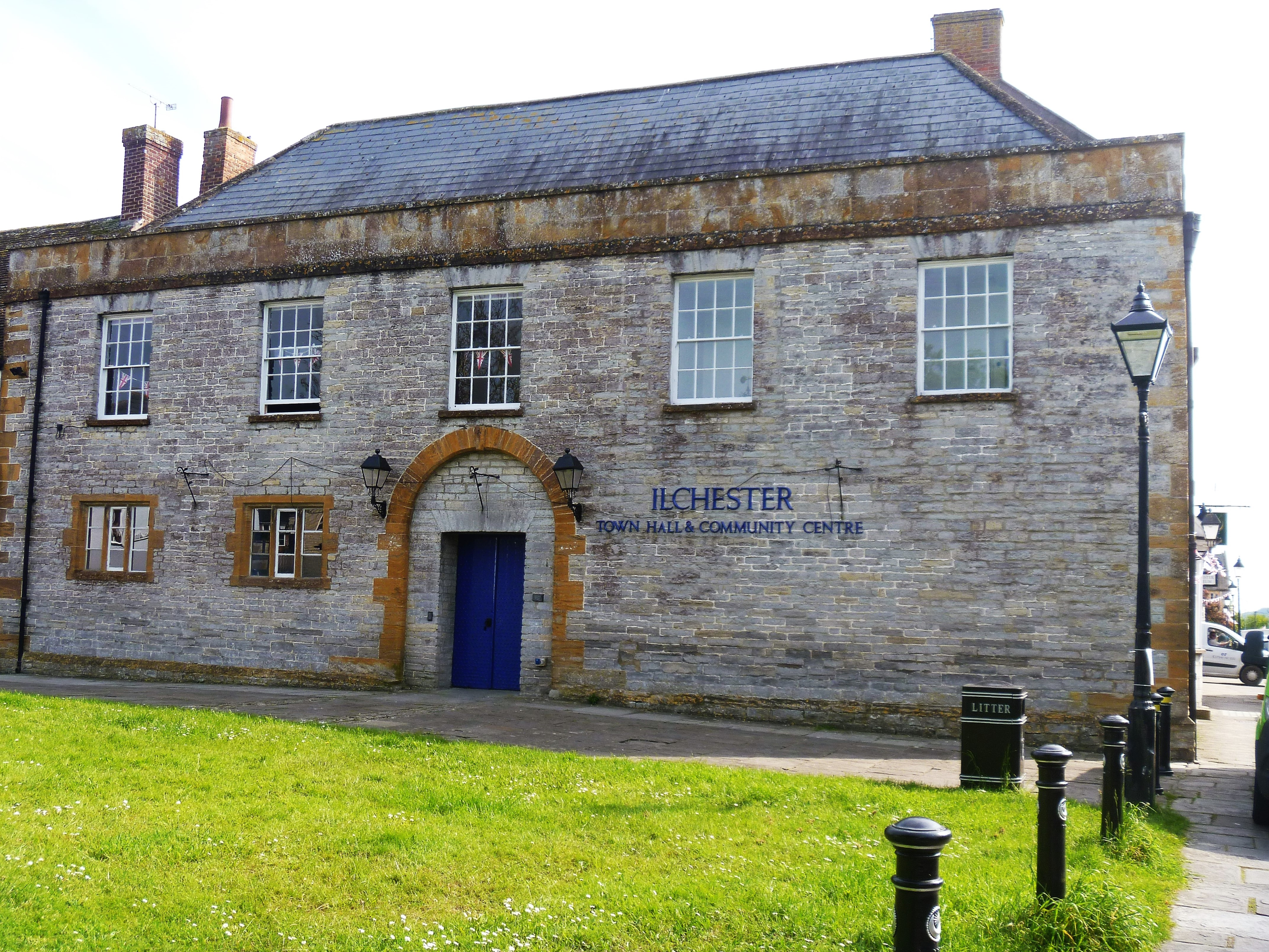
- Ilchester Town Hall

- Shown in Somerset
- 51.0016°N 2.6830°W
- Location: High Street, Ilchester

History
- Built: 1816

Site notes
- Architectural style: Neoclassical style

Listed Building – Grade II
- Official name: The Town Hall
- Designated: 19 April 1961
- Reference no.: 1057301

Ilchester Town Hall is a municipal building on High Street in Ilchester, Somerset, England. The structure serves as the offices and meeting place of Ilchester Parish Council and is a Grade II listed building.

== History ==
The first building on the site was a shire hall which dated from the 13th century, when Ilchester was the county town of Somerset. In the 17th century, it was replaced by a new structure, parts of which are incorporated into the west end of the current building.

The current building was designed in the neoclassical style, built in rubble masonry and was completed in 1816. The design involved an asymmetrical main frontage of five bays facing onto the Town Square. The central bay featured a large round headed arch with voussoirs and a keystone containing a doorway. To the left, there were two bipartite windows and, on the first floor, there were five sash windows. At roof level, there was a parapet and a hipped roof. Internally, the principal room was an assembly room, which featured a vaulted ceiling, on the first floor.

Ilchester had a very small electorate and a dominant patron, Sir William Manners, which meant the UK Parliament recognised it as a rotten borough. The right to elect members of parliament was removed by the Reform Act 1832. The building was used as a courthouse until 1843 and as the county gaol until 1846.

The borough council, which had met in the council chamber, was abolished under the Municipal Corporations Act 1883. Its assets, including the town hall, were transferred to a specially formed entity, the Ilchester Town Trust, in 1889. Following local government reorganisation in 1974, it became the meeting place of Ilchester Parish Council. In 1989, Ilchester Museum opened in the Town Hall House, immediately behind the town hall. Since then, the town hall has continued serving as a community event venue.
