= Applewood cheese =

Type of smoke-flavoured cheese

Applewood
- Other names: Applewood smoked cheddar
- Country of origin: United Kingdom
- Source of milk: Cows
- Texture: Semi-hard/soft
- Fat content: 11g per ounce
- Protein content: 8g per ounce

Applewood, or Applewood smoked cheddar, is a round, white smoke-flavoured Cheddar cheese that is manufactured by the Ilchester Cheese Company (Previously Norseland Ltd) in Somerset, England.

== Character ==
Applewood smoked cheddar is a fairly dense semi-hard cheese. Applewood is not smoked, but is instead treated with an artificial smoke flavouring. The cheese is coated with mild paprika, giving it a golden-amber appearance. The cheese itself is rather soft in some cases, making it difficult to grate. The smoked flavour of the cheese does not leave a burnt aftertaste.

In 2019, Norseland Limited launched a vegan version of their Applewood cheese in collaboration with VBites in both pre-sliced packages and in blocks. It won the award for Best Vegan Cheese at the FreeFrom Food Awards in 2020.

== Nutritional data (per oz.) ==
(Note: one ounce is about 28 grams)

Calories	130
Total Fat	11 g
Saturated fat	7 g
Trans fat	0 g
Cholesterol	37 mg
Sodium	213 mg
Total Carbohydrate	0 g
Dietary fibre	0 g
Protein	8 g
