= Church of St Mary Major, Ilchester =

Church in Somerset, England

Church of St Mary Major
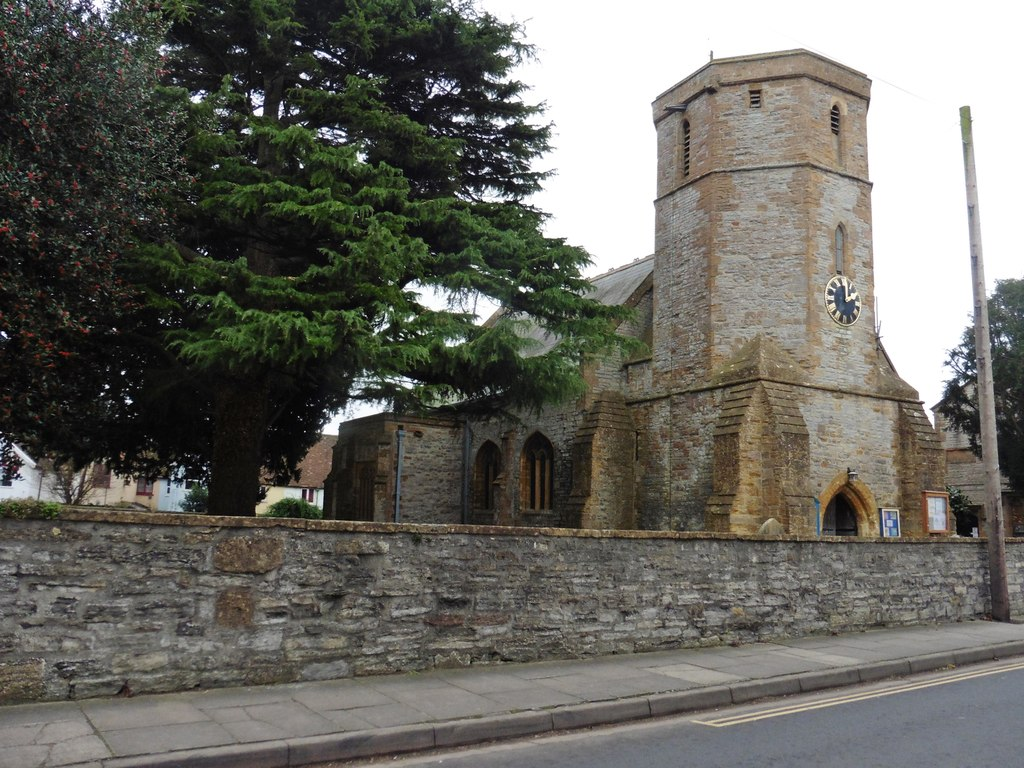

- Location within Somerset
- 51.0009°N 2.6818°W
- Location: Ilchester, Somerset, England

History
- Built: 13th century

Listed Building – Grade II*
- Official name: Church of St Mary Major
- Designated: 19 April 1961
- Reference no.: 1345741

The Anglican Church of St Mary Major in Ilchester, Somerset, England was built in the 13th century. It is a Grade II* listed building.

== History ==
Ilchester was under the patronage of Muchelney Abbey until 1239 and then came under the control of the Bishop of Bath and Wells.

The church was built in the 13th century. The church was reduced in size in the 15th century. Some of the pillars from an arcade were discovered during the 19th century restoration and one is now visible in the churchyard. During a Victorian restoration between 1879 and 1880 the south aisle was added.

The parish is part of the benefice of Ilchester with Northover, Limington Yeovilton and Podimore within the Diocese of Bath and Wells.

== Architecture ==
The stone building has hamstone dressings and a clay tile roof. It consists of a three-bay nave and two-bay chancel. The three-stage tower is supported by corner buttresses at the first stage and then has an octagonal tower in the upper stages. The tower has a peal of five bells, two of which are by the Bilbie family.

Most of the decoration and fittings are 19th century however there are an octagonal pulpit from the late 16th century and fragments of 17th century dado panel and medieval stained glass. Behind the pulpit are fragments of a wall painting. The font was discovered in two pieces in the churchyard and reassembled.

== See also ==
- List of ecclesiastical parishes in the Diocese of Bath and Wells
