= Ilchester Museum =

Museum in Ilchester, Somerset, England

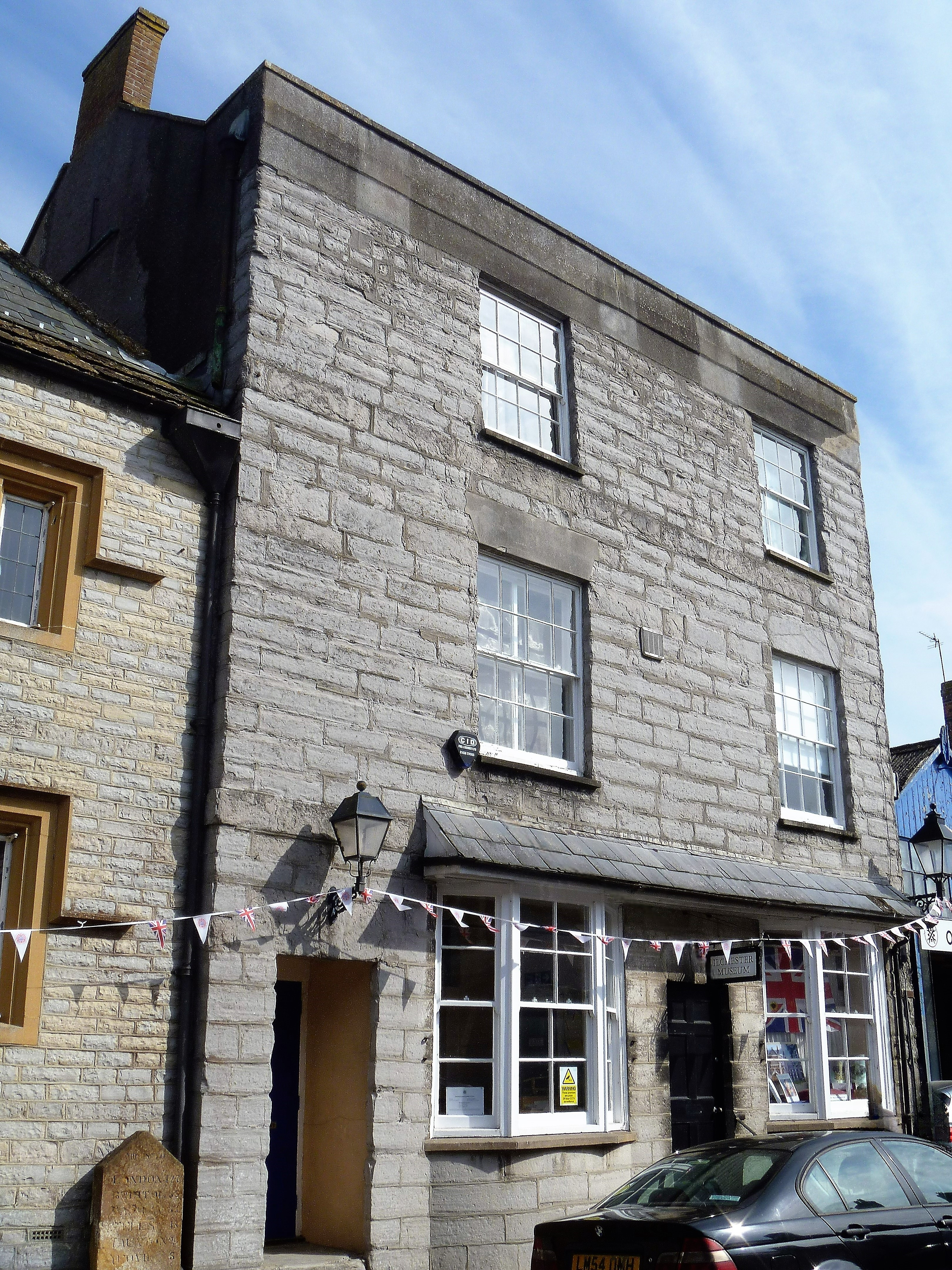
- Entrance to the Ilchester Museum in the High Street (Note the hanging "Ilchester Museum" sign above the front door)

- Shown within Somerset
- Location: Ilchester, Somerset, England
- Coordinates: 51.0015°N 2.6831°W
- Type: Local museum

Listed Building – Grade II
- Official name: Town Hall House
- Designated: 19 April 1961
- Reference no.: 1267580

Ilchester Museum is a small local museum in Ilchester, Somerset, England. The museum is based in a former private house, known as the Town Hall House. Standing behind Ilchester Town Hall, the Town Hall House is a Grade II listed building.

== History ==
=== The building ===
The building was built as a private house in rubble masonry and was probably completed in the 18th century. Standing behind Ilchester Town Hall, it may have been modified when the town hall was completed in 1816. The design involved an asymmetrical main frontage of two bays facing onto the High Street. On the ground floor there was a central doorway flanked by two bay windows, all surmounted by a lean-to slate roof. The upper two floors were fenestrated by sash windows and at roof level, there was a parapet.

=== The collection ===
The museum was established in 1989, and is dedicated to the memory of the local author, James Stevens-Cox, who wrote the book, A History of Ilchester, the Ancient County Town of Somerset, published in 1947. It is managed by the Ilchester Town Trust. The museum includes exhibits showing the history of the town from the Iron Age and Roman periods, when it was known as Lindinis, to the present day.

These exhibits include a complete female skeleton from the end of the Roman period. There is also the town's 13th-century mace or staff of office, bearing the insignia of Richard I as well as three kings and an angel: it is the oldest staff of office in England. The collection also includes a full set of Maundy Money which Queen Elizabeth II presented to a local parishioner in Wells Cathedral in 1993 and which was acquired by the museum in 1995. A short programme about the gaols of Ilchester, made with the assistance of museum staff, featured on the BBC Radio Somerset programme, Treasure Trove, in 2017.
