= Witham Friary =

Village in Somerset, England

Coordinates: 51.169°N 2.366°W

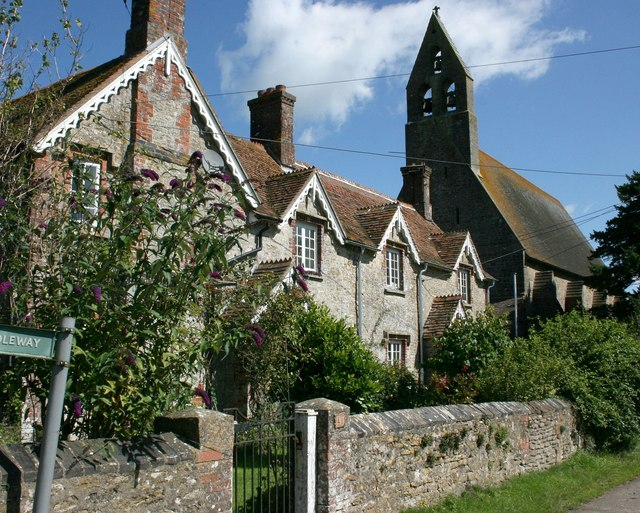
- Church of St Mary, Witham Friary

- Location within Somerset
- Population: 399 (2011)
- OS grid reference: ST745409
- Unitary authority: Somerset Council
- Ceremonial county: Somerset
- Region: South West
- Country: England
- Sovereign state: United Kingdom
- Post town: FROME
- Postcode district: BA11
- Dialling code: 01373
- Police: Avon and Somerset
- Fire: Devon and Somerset
- Ambulance: South Western
- UK Parliament: Frome and East Somerset

Witham Friary is a small English village and civil parish located between the towns of Frome and Bruton in the county of Somerset. It is in the Cranborne Chase and West Wiltshire Downs Area of Outstanding Natural Beauty and the ancient Forest of Selwood.

== History ==
The parish was part of the hundred of Frome.

The village takes its name from a technically confused reference (a friary is generally a house of Franciscans and in any case not of Carthusians) to the Witham Charterhouse, a Carthusian Priory founded in 1182 by Henry II, which had peripheral settlements including one at Charterhouse and possibly another at Green Ore. It is reputed to be the first Carthusian house in England. One of only nine Carthusian Houses in the country, the priory did not survive the Dissolution of the Monasteries. At the Dissolution it was worth £227; the equivalent of £52,000 today (2006). Excavations in 1921 revealed buttressed wall foundations and building rubble including glazed roof and floor tiles. It is a scheduled ancient monument.

Part of the priory now serves as St Mary's Parish Church. Although the original building dates from around 1200 it was altered in a transitional style in 1828, and then rebuilt and extended 1875 by William White in "Muscular Gothic" style. It has a three-bay nave and continuous one bay apsidal chancel, built of local limestone rubble, supported on each side by four massive flying buttresses. The plastered interior is entered through a Norman style doorway. Inside the church is a scraped octagonal font dating from around 1450. The Jacobean pulpit contains medieval work and there is a royal arms of 1660 at the west end. The stained glass windows contain fragments of medieval glass, with the windows in the south being made by Sir Ninian Comper. It has been designated by English Heritage as a Grade I listed building.

The former Village Reading Rooms are in a thirteenth-century building which was once a dovecote associated with the Priory. They are grade II* listed building but are included on Mendip District Council Historic Buildings at Risk Register.

The village has older roots. A wealth of nearby tumuli is indicative of ancient human settlement. An archaeological dig in 1985 discovered a Neolithic axe and a Roman road. The village is mentioned in the Domesday Book of 1086, when it supported 11 villagers.

The former railway station at Witham was the end of a branch line through Shepton Mallet, Wells and Cheddar. The branch closed to passengers in 1963, but Witham station stayed open for another 3 years (last day of service on Saturday 1 October 1966) although the main line to Exeter remains open. The nearest railway station is Bruton. Part of the redundant line that ran to Shepton Mallet now forms the East Somerset Railway.

== Governance ==
The parish council has responsibility for local issues, including setting an annual precept (local rate) to cover the council's operating costs and producing annual accounts for public scrutiny. The parish council evaluates local planning applications and works with the local police, district council officers, and neighbourhood watch groups on matters of crime, security, and traffic. The parish council's role also includes initiating projects for the maintenance and repair of parish facilities, as well as consulting with the district council on the maintenance, repair, and improvement of highways, drainage, footpaths, public transport, and street cleaning. Conservation matters (including trees and listed buildings) and environmental issues are also the responsibility of the council.

For local government purposes, since 1 April 2023, the village comes under the unitary authority of Somerset Council. Prior to this, it was part of the non-metropolitan district of Mendip, which was formed on 1 April 1974 under the Local Government Act 1972, having previously been part of Frome Rural District.

It is also part of the Frome and East Somerset county constituency represented in the House of Commons of the Parliament of the United Kingdom. It elects one Member of Parliament (MP) by the first past the post system of election.

== Public House ==
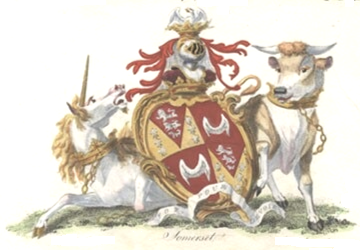
Coat of arms of the Duke of Somerset

The Seymour Arms is a traditional public house. Purpose-built along with farm buildings in 1866 or 1867 for the Duke of Somerset's estate, it takes its name from the family name of the Duke of Somerset.

The pub is noted by CAMRA because of its beautifully preserved interior, and is included in their National Inventory of Historic Pubs.

== Water Dispute ==
Since the 19th century, the village water supply has come from the estate of the Duke of Somerset rather than from a commercial water company. The estate's decision to terminate the supply was a cause for local concern, however after intervention from the county council the matter was resolved, and the supply is now on a firm footing.

== Sports, clubs and societies ==
The village has a vibrant cricket club with an adult team that plays only friendly matches and welcomes all players of all abilities; two youth teams (under 11 and under 13) that have experienced success at district level and runs the ECB All Stars and Dynamos programmes for younger children. The beauty of the area the Seymour Arms also makes the cricket club popular with touring teams.

In addition the village "conker committee" also organise a number of fun events through the year and raise money for charities and local projects, whilst there is an active history society with regular talks in the village hall.

== Geography and Geology ==
The village lies near the source of the River Frome and at 96 metres above sea level. There is a risk of flooding in some properties. The underlying solid geology is Middle Jurassic Cornbrash.

== Building the Dream ==
In 2004 the village hosted a reality television programme broadcast on Channel 4 called Building the Dream, hosted by Linda Barker. Couples competed to win a dream home in the village. A local production company, Zeal, was responsible.
