= Ilchester Cheese Company =

Cheese company based in Ilchester, Somerset, UK

Coordinates: 51°00′46″N 2°41′01″W

Norseland Ltd
- Trade name: Ilchester Cheese Company
- Formerly: Ilchester Cheese Company Ltd
- Company type: Subsidiary
- Industry: Cheese
- Founded: 1962; 64 years ago
- Headquarters: Ilchester, Somerset, England, United Kingdom
- Products: Applewood; Five Counties cheese
- Parent: TINE SA

The Ilchester Cheese Company is a cheese company based in Ilchester, Somerset. The Ilchester brands are part of Norseland, a subsidiary of Norwegian dairy company Tine SA.

== History ==
In 1962, Ken Seaton, a hotelier in Ilchester, Somerset, England, tried combining cheese with chives, Worthington E Bitter beer and a blend of spices. This and other blended cheeses are manufactured and distributed by the Ilchester Cheese Company.

The company received farm subsidies from the European Union of €891,256 between 2001 and 2005.

== Products ==
Ilchester do not actually manufacture any cheese from scratch, but specialise in blending a variety of British cheeses with other ingredients, such as beer and fruit. Notable Ilchester cheeses include Applewood, a smoke-flavoured Cheddar cheese, and Five Counties, which is a sandwich of five layers of different English cheeses.

The company also produces vegan cheeses.
