= Eremites Friary, Bristol =

Coordinates: 51.447842°N 2.586132°W

Eremites Friary was a friary in Bristol, England. The Brothers Eremites of St. Augustine kept a small convent near Temple Gate, founded by Sir Simon and Sir William Montacute in 1320. No trace of it remains today.
