= Church of St Mary, Witham Friary =

Church in Somerset, England

Church of St Mary
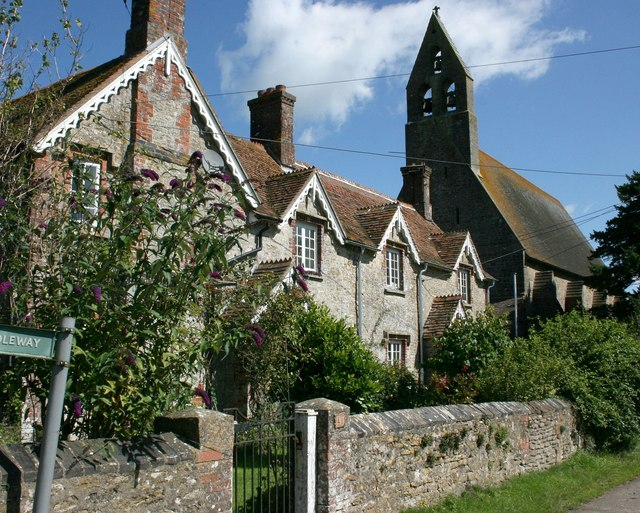

- Location within Somerset

General information
- Location: Witham Friary, England
- Coordinates: 51.1686°N 2.3675°W
- Completed: c. 1200

The Church of St Mary in Witham Friary, Somerset, England, dates from around 1200 and it has been designated as a Grade I listed building.

The church was originally part of the priory which gave the village its name. The Witham Charterhouse, a Carthusian Priory founded in 1182 by Henry II, which had peripheral settlements including one at Charterhouse and possibly another at Green Ore. It is reputed to be the first Carthusian house in England. One of only nine Carthusian Houses, the priory did not survive the dissolution of the monasteries. At the dissolution it was worth £227; the equivalent of £52,000 today (2006).

Although the original building dates from around 1200 it was altered in a transitional style in 1828, and then rebuilt and extended 1875 by William White in "Muscular Gothic" style. It has a three-bay nave and continuous one bay apsidal chancel, built of local limestone rubble, supported on each side by four massive flying buttresses. The plastered interior is entered through a Norman style doorway. Inside the church is a scraped octagonal font dating from around 1450. The Jacobean pulpit contains medieval work and there is a royal arms of 1660 at the west end. The stained glass windows contain fragments of medieval glass, with those in the south being made by Sir Ninian Comper.

== See also ==
- List of Grade I listed buildings in Mendip
- List of towers in Somerset
