= Sack Friary, Bristol =

Friary in Bristol, England

Coordinates: 51.4542°N 2.5913°W

Sack Friary, Bristol was a friary in Bristol, England. It was established in 1266 and dissolved in 1286.

The mendicant religious order was known as the Friars of the Sack and the Brothers of Penitence. (Note: The friars wore garments made of coarse cloth, similar to that of the Franciscans. They did not eat meat and only drank water.) The friars first appeared in England in 1257, with the order apparently originating in Italy, where they were known as "Fratres de Sacco". (Note: Others attribute their origin to France as many of their known homes were in France.) The order began in 1251 and expanded into Britain, France, Spain, Germany and Palestine. The Second Council of Lyon took up the question of limiting mendicant religious orders. In 1274, the four major orders-the Franciscans, the Dominicans, the Carmelites and the Austin Friars were allowed to remain with the lesser orders instructed to disband. (Note: Mendicant orders founded after 1215 were subject to the disbanding order. They were not to accept any new members of their community, thus the orders would succumb to attrition.)

The first mention of the order in Bristol was circa 1266 when Henry III of England granted the friars six oaks from Selwood Forest for building. Records of the 1287 Pleas of the Crown establish that there was a house of Friars of the Sack before that time, but no one is certain where it was located. The last mention of the order in Bristol is found on a document dated October 31, 1322. The document refers to a tenement outside Bristol Temple Gate located near the church of the "Friars di saccis" signed by Simon de Ely, burgess of Bristol to William de Cameleigh.

== Sources ==
- Gasquet, Francis Aidan (1905). English monastic life. Methuen. hdl:2027/uc1.$b54767.
- Page, William (1907). The Victoria History of the County of Gloucester, Volume 2. Constable. ISBN 978-0-19-722755-8.
- Page, William (1909). A History of the County of London: Volume 1, London Within the Bars, Westminster and Southwark. Victoria County History.
