= Witham Charterhouse =

Former Carthusian abbey in Witham, Somerset, England

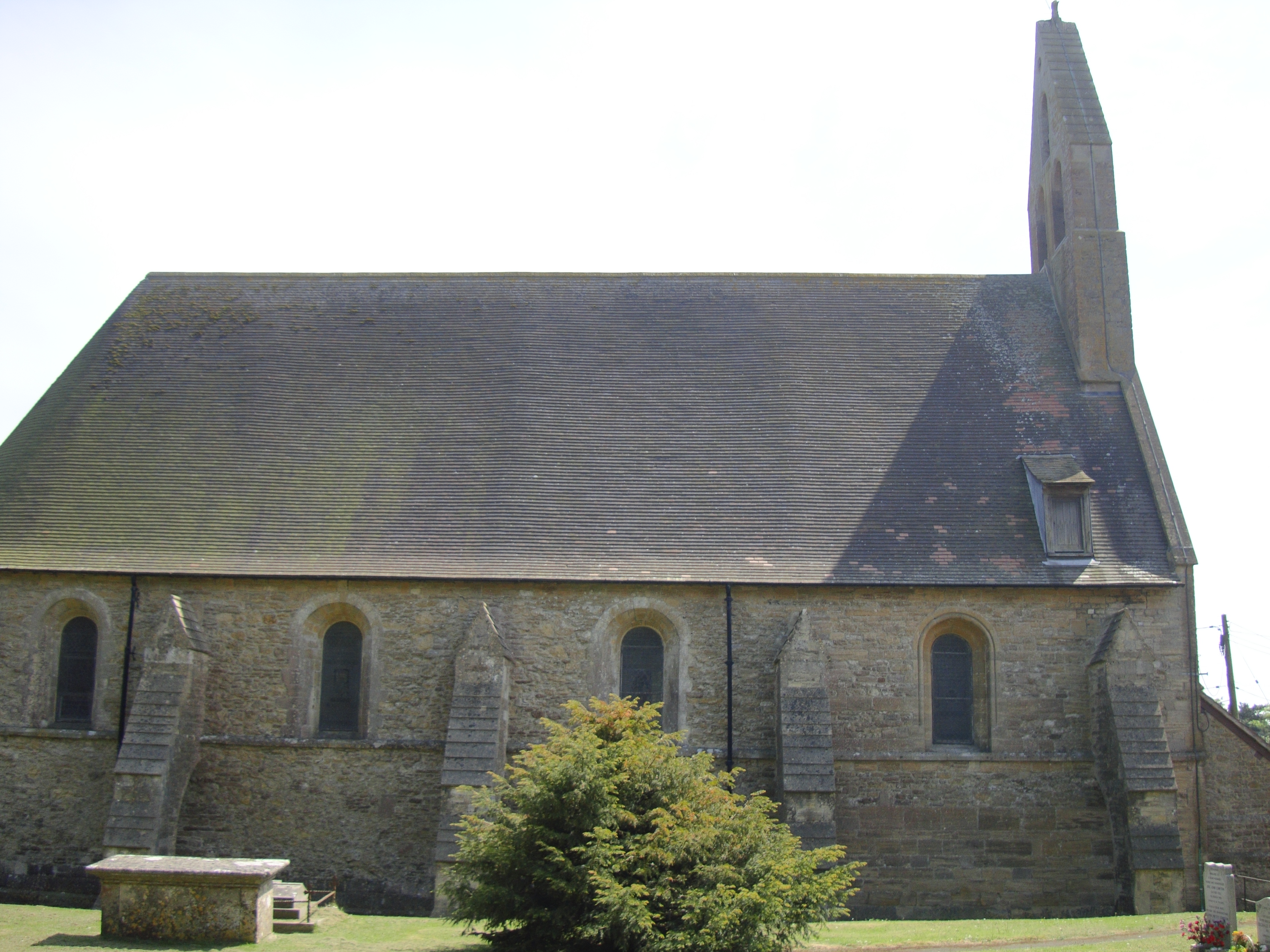
- Parish church of the Blessed Virgin Mary, St John Baptist and All Saints, Witham Friary, formerly lay brothers' church of the Charterhouse

- Shown within Somerset and the UK

Religion
- Affiliation: Carthusian
- Year consecrated: 1178/1179
- Status: abandoned

Location
- Location: Witham Friary, Somerset, England
- Interactive map of Witham Charterhouse
- Coordinates: 51.1631°N 2.3660°W

Witham Charterhouse, also Witham Priory, at Witham Friary, Somerset, was established in 1178/79, the earliest of the ten medieval Carthusian houses (charterhouses) in England. It was suppressed in the Dissolution of the Monasteries in 1539.

== History ==
The charterhouse was founded by Henry II in his Royal Forest of Selwood, as part of his penance for the murder of Archbishop Thomas Becket of Canterbury and was established at Witham Friary, Somerset, in 1178/1179 by a founding party led by a monk called Narbert from the Grande Chartreuse. Hugh of Avalon (later Saint Hugh) was made prior of Witham Charterhouse in 1180.

The house was suppressed as part of the dissolution of the monasteries on 15 March 1539.

The lay brothers' church is now used as the parish church of Witham Friary.

== Archaeology ==
In 1921 excavations revealed buttressed wall foundations and building rubble including glazed roof tiles and floor tiles. Later work in 1965 and 1968 revealed further buildings, two of which were interpreted as the chapter house and possibly a church.

== Remains ==
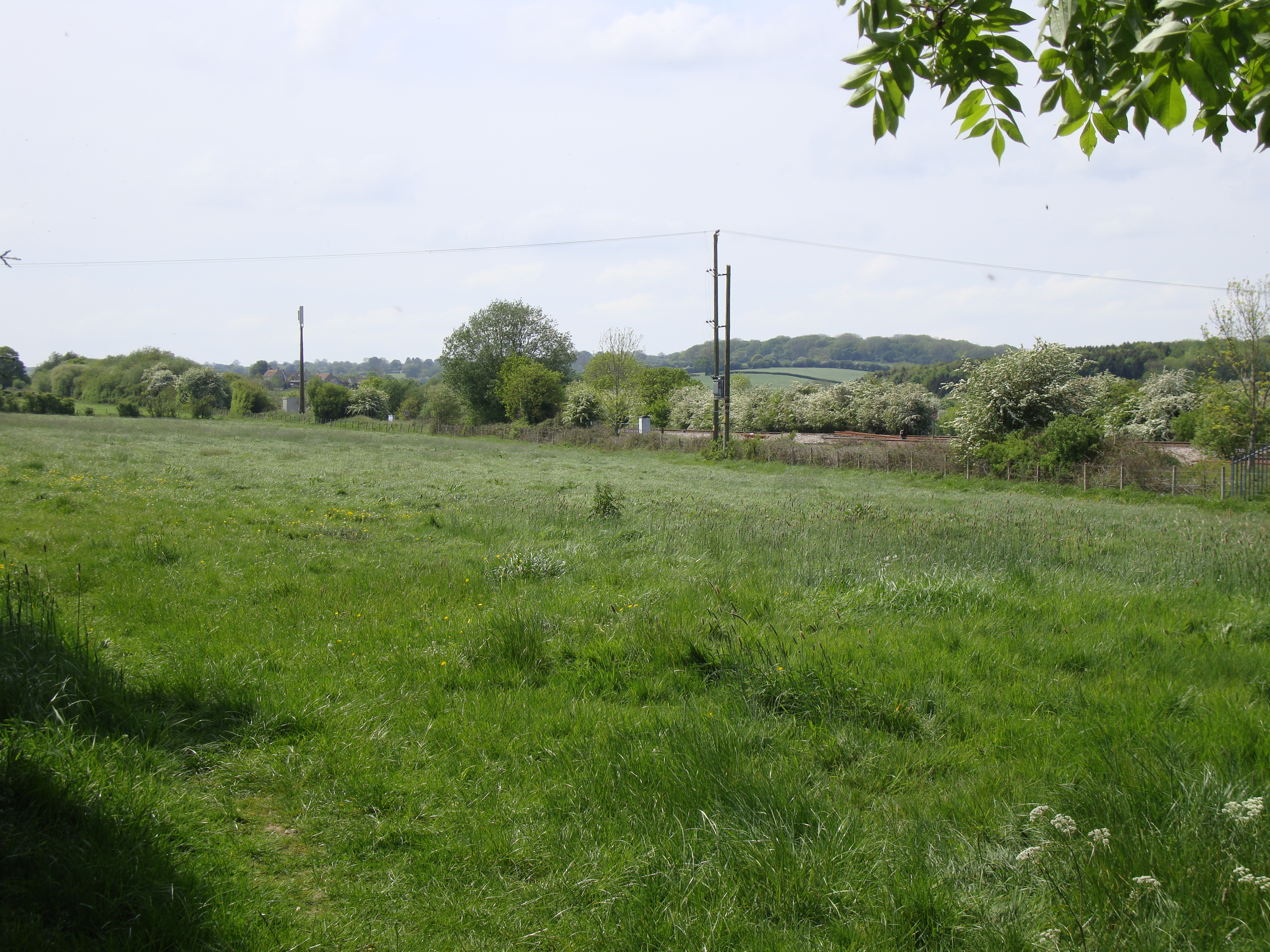
Site of the cloisters

The site of the charterhouse is marked by extensive rectilinear earthworks, cut by a railway line, and some worked stone can still be seen in buildings in the village of Witham Friary. The remains of the original monastic fishponds still survive to the east of the site.
