= Kilve =

Village in Somerset, England

Coordinates: 51.1788°N 3.2156°W

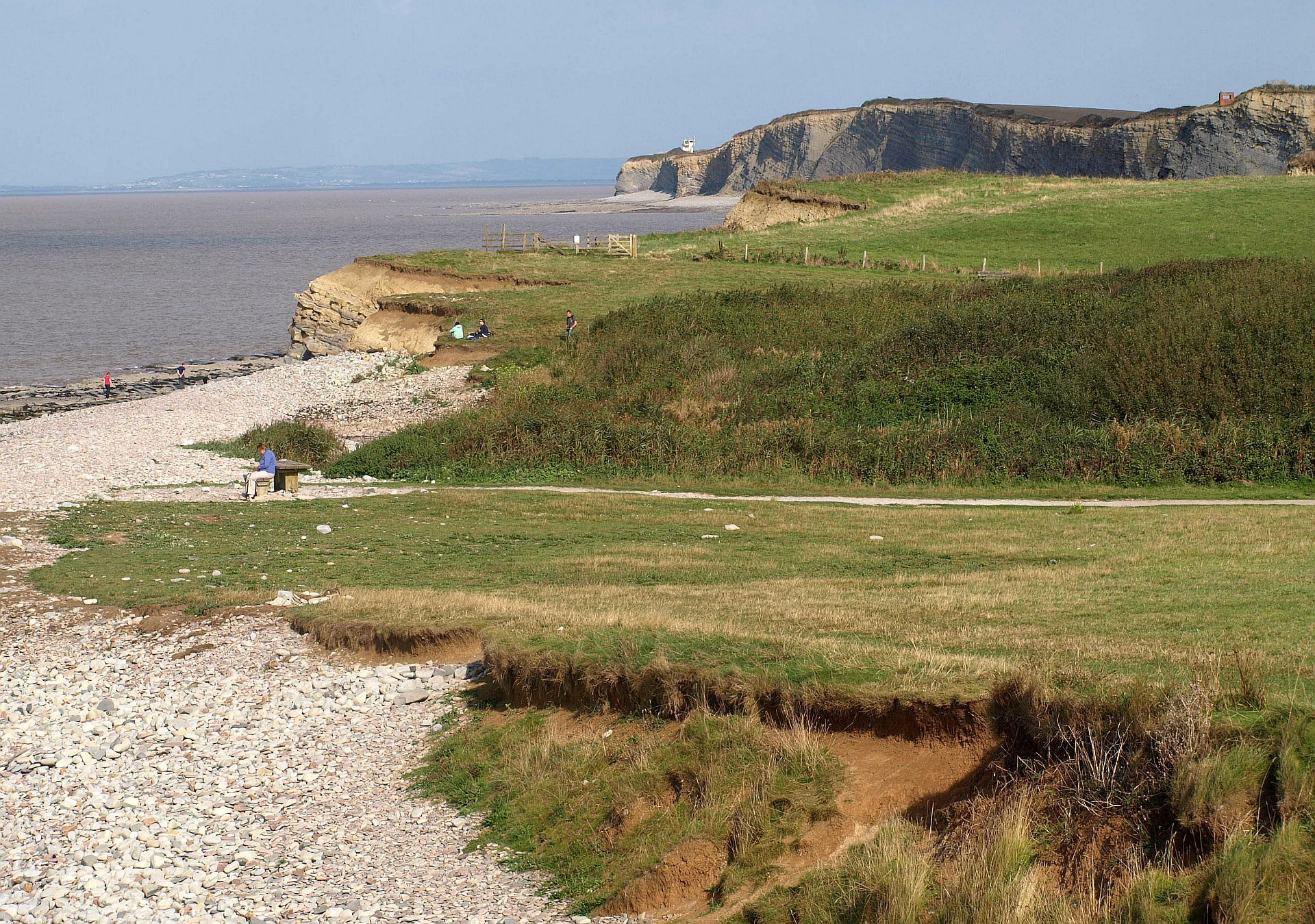
- Coast at Kilve Pill

- Location within Somerset
- Population: 344 (2011)
- OS grid reference: ST151428
- Unitary authority: Somerset
- Ceremonial county: Somerset
- Region: South West
- Country: England
- Sovereign state: United Kingdom
- Post town: BRIDGWATER
- Postcode district: TA5
- Dialling code: 01278
- Police: Avon and Somerset
- Fire: Devon and Somerset
- Ambulance: South Western
- UK Parliament: Tiverton and Minehead

Kilve is a village in Somerset, England, within the Quantock Hills Area of Outstanding Natural Beauty, the first AONB to be established, in 1957.

It lies on the A39 almost exactly equidistant from Bridgwater to the east and Minehead to the west. The village includes a 17th-century coaching inn, and a post office and stores. This part of the village, formerly known as Putsham, also contains the village hall, which was extended to celebrate the coronation of Queen Elizabeth II. Not far away is Doniford a settlement near the harbour town of Watchet.

== History ==
The village was listed in the Domesday Book of 1086 as Clive, probably meaning cliff.

The parish of Kilve was part of the Williton and Freemanners Hundred.

=== Oil extraction ===
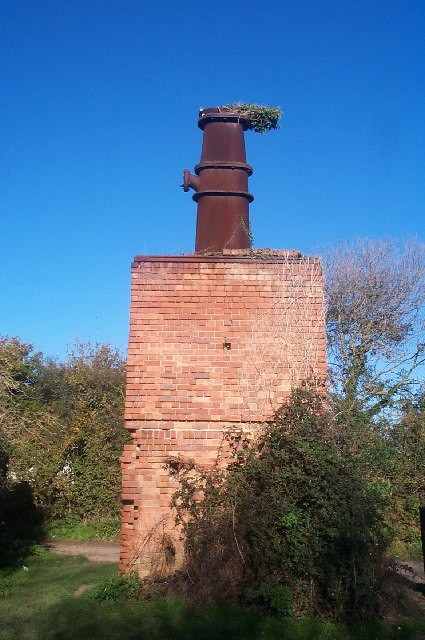
Oil retort

At the far end of the car park are the remains of a red brick retort, built in 1924, when it was discovered that the shale found in the cliffs was rich in oil. The beach is part of the Blue Anchor to Lilstock Coast SSSI (Site of Special Scientific Interest). Along this coast the cliffs are layered with compressed strata of oil-bearing shale and blue, yellow and brown lias embedded with fossils. In 1924 Dr Forbes-Leslie founded the Shaline Company to exploit them. This retort house is thought to be the first structure erected here for the conversion of shale to oil but the company was unable to raise sufficient capital and this is now all that remains of the anticipated Somerset oil boom.

== Governance ==
The parish council has responsibility for local issues, including setting an annual precept (local rate) to cover the council’s operating costs and producing annual accounts for public scrutiny. The parish council evaluates local planning applications and works with the local police, district council officers, and neighbourhood watch groups on matters of crime, security, and traffic. The parish council's role also includes initiating projects for the maintenance and repair of parish facilities, as well as consulting with the district council on the maintenance, repair, and improvement of highways, drainage, footpaths, public transport, and street cleaning. Conservation matters (including trees and listed buildings) and environmental issues are also the responsibility of the council.

For local government purposes, since 1 April 2023, the parish comes under the unitary authority of Somerset Council. Prior to this, it was part of the non-metropolitan district of Somerset West and Taunton (formed on 1 April 2019) and, before this, the district of West Somerset (established under the Local Government Act 1972). It was part of Williton Rural District before 1974.

It is also part of the Tiverton and Minehead county constituency represented in the House of Commons of the Parliament of the United Kingdom. It elects one Member of Parliament (MP) by the first past the post system of election.

== Geography ==
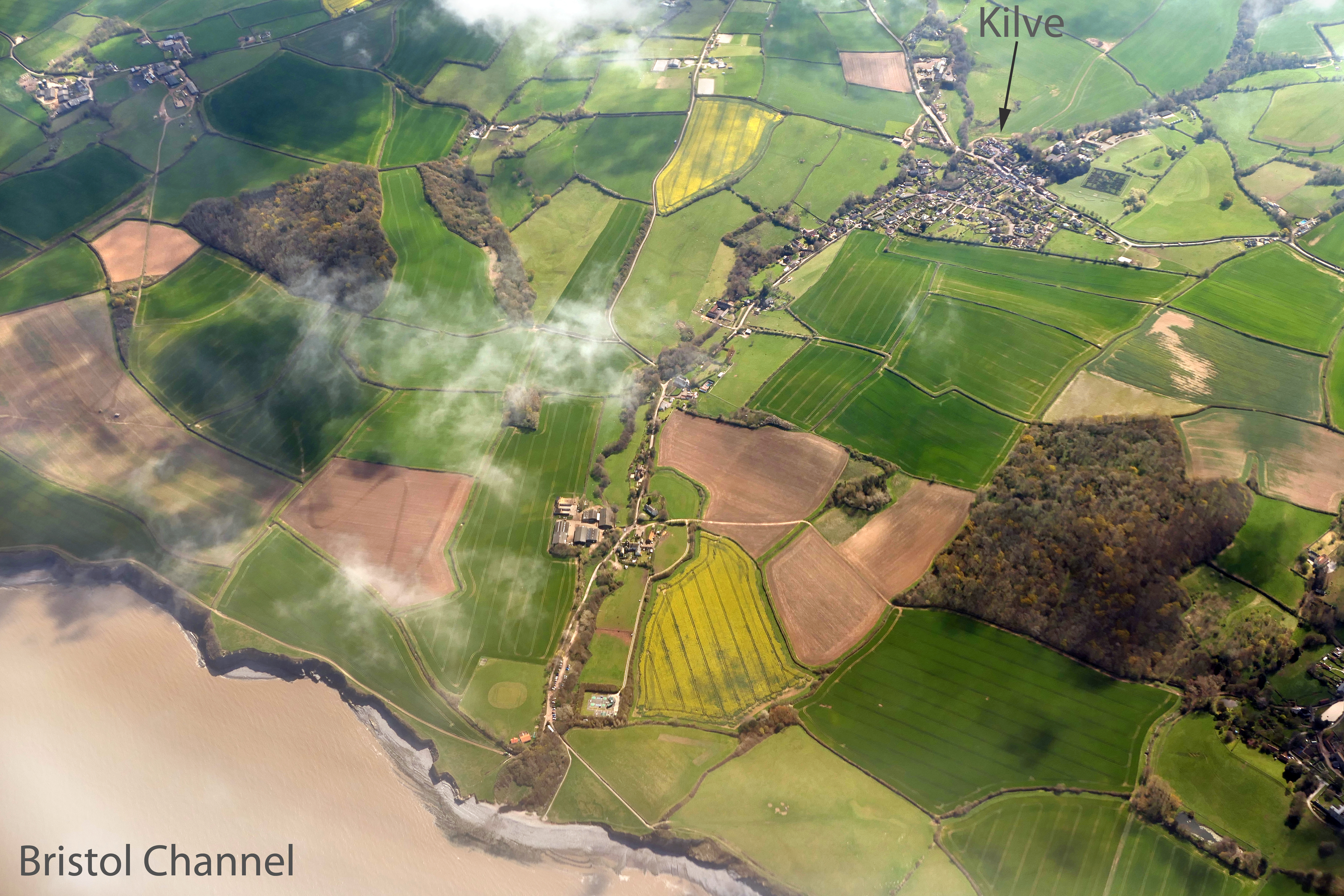
An aerial view of Kilve.

The village actually consists of three settlements. One of these is up Pardlestone Lane, which meanders steeply southwards through mossy cottages, and a few more modern bungalows nestle into the hillside. Berta Lawrence, in her book Quantock Country, suggests that the name Pardlestone derives from the old alternative 'Parleston', where a tiny settlement here belonged to a Saxon called Parlo. "But," she writes, "there are local inhabitants who tell of a mythical Frenchman called Pardel and an equally mythical Pardel's Stone stuck somewhere up this lane."

A further settlement lies along the ridge to the east of the village, with a steep and narrow lane running down to join Sea Lane at Meadow House, which was once the Rectory. From halfway down this lane there is a panoramic view of the coastline as far as North Hill in Minehead and across the channel to South Wales and the Brecon Beacons. In the foreground lie the Church of St Mary, the ruins of a medieval chantry and one old barn still standing, though dilapidated, with traditional round stone pillars. Alongside the chantry are two houses and a tea-garden. Lane End was built in traditional cob construction by the distinguished Arts and Crafts architect Norman Jewson as a summer house for himself.

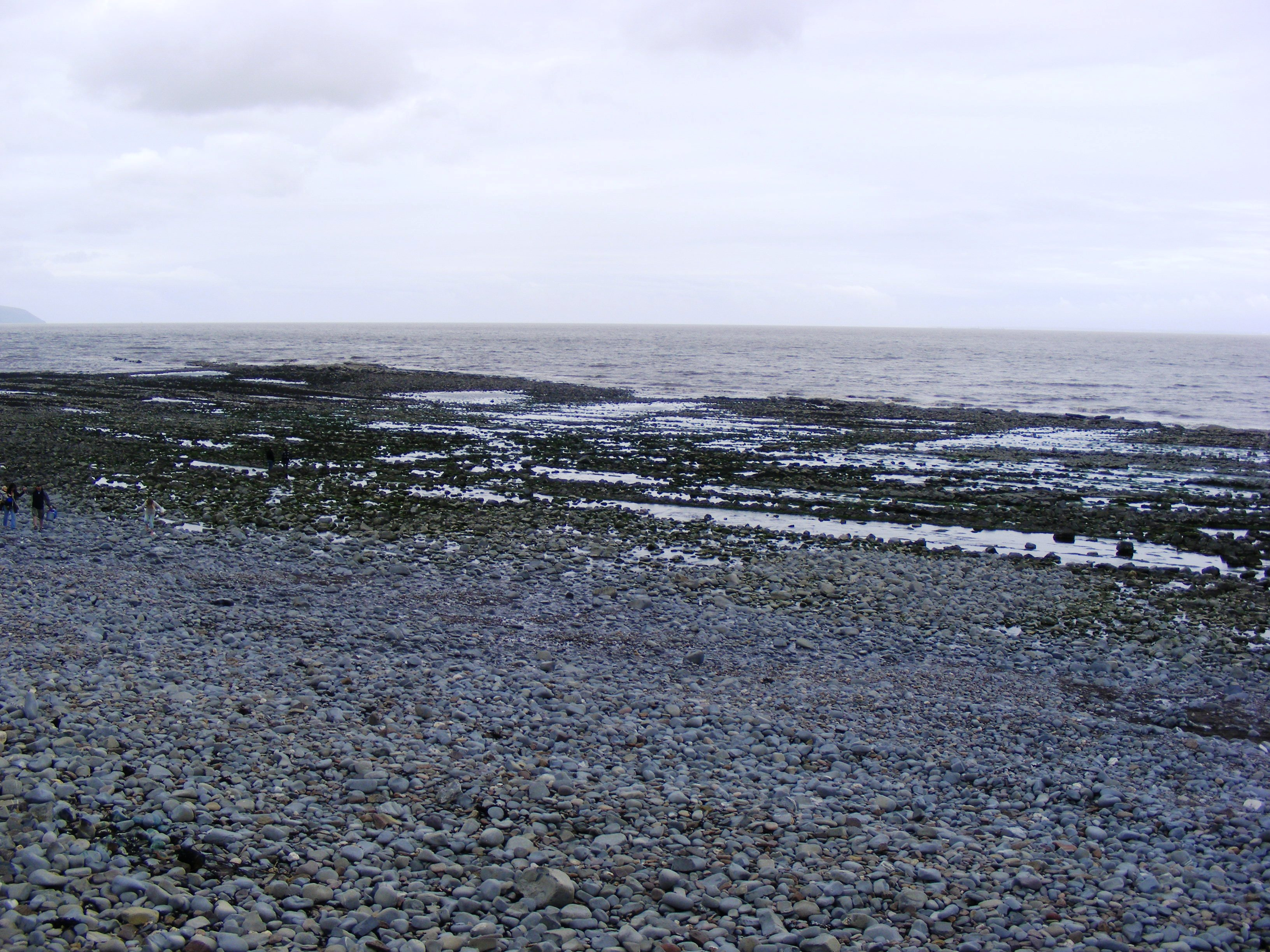
The wavecut beach

A path leads down from the chantry through fields now used as a car-park to the beach which William Wordsworth, the Romantic poet, who lived for a brief period with his sister Dorothy at Alfoxton House, described as "Kilve's delightful shore". The beach is on the West Somerset Coast Path.

Kilve Pill, where the stream from Holford runs into the sea, was once a tiny port, used for importing culm, an inferior type of coal which was used in the lime burning process. It was also the site for "glatting" which was the hunting of conger eels by dogs. On the shore a Saint Keyne serpent can be seen, which a local legend says is a snake turned to stone, but is in reality an ammonite.

It is just possible to make out the remains of a stone jetty and the ruins of a lime kiln nearby. Here the limestone was burnt to provide farmers with the lime to spread on their fields. The limestone carrier Laurina was wrecked at Kilve in 1876. The Pill was long associated with smuggling and legend has it that barrels of spirits hidden in the chantry were deliberately set fire to as the revenue men appeared on the scene. Legend also has it that the smugglers' ponies were taught to respond to the commands "whoa" and "gee up" in the reverse sense of the words.

Along the whole length of the stream from Holford to the shore at Kilve there were a number of working mills. Farmers appear to have used water-power in the same way as modern ones use the power from engines. The old mill in the village, now a private house, still retains its overshot wheel, but the others have long since vanished.

== Landmarks ==
Oil Retort House, a Grade II listed building, is located in Kilve.

=== Kilve Court ===
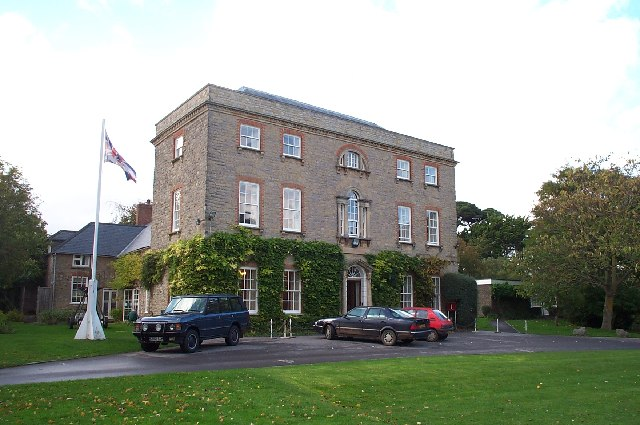
Kilve Court

South of the village is Kilve Court Residential and Outdoor Learning Centre. Kilve Court is a Grade II listed Georgian mansion It runs a wide range of courses for young people including Adventurous Activity Courses set in the centre's extensive grounds and Academic Enrichment Courses. The centre also provides School stays as well as providing a Duke of Edinburgh service. This includes Bronze and Silver expeditions and Gold Residentials. The main part of the building was constructed between 1702 and 1705, in the reign of Queen Anne, by Henry Sweating, and incorporating an earlier dwelling, although alterations were made in the 1920s by Clough Williams-Ellis. Somerset County Council acquired the house in 1964 and it was opened in 1965 with residential places for 26 children and four members of staff. Since that date there have been a number of extensions and new additions to the existing buildings. Kilve Court can now sleep 133. The Outdoor Centre, a Centre among the grounds of Kilve Court has hutted accommodation and can sleep 76. In 1862, Edward Fownes Luttrell bought "Kilve Manor" which previously had been used as a farmhouse and had been used by priests. After Edward, it was used passed to his brother George Luttrell who then sold the property to Daniel Badcock. Daniel Badcock's widow Mary sold it after her husband's death to Colonel Joseph Cook-Hurle. He and his wife then died and the building was sold by their son Lt. Col. R.J. Cook-Hurle to Somerset County Council in 1964. It is still used as an outdoor education center to this day providing sessions including climbing, abseiling and grassledging. In 2020, the council got planning permission for a lake which was made operational in 2021 providing paddleboarding and kayaking. Kilve Court had hosted family days each year before and after the ease of coronavirus lockdowns, seeing over 1000 people each year. During the coronavirus pandemic, the site provided emergency accommodation for those in need and made frozen meals which then got distributed in the local community for those who were struggling due to the lockdowns.

== Religious sites ==
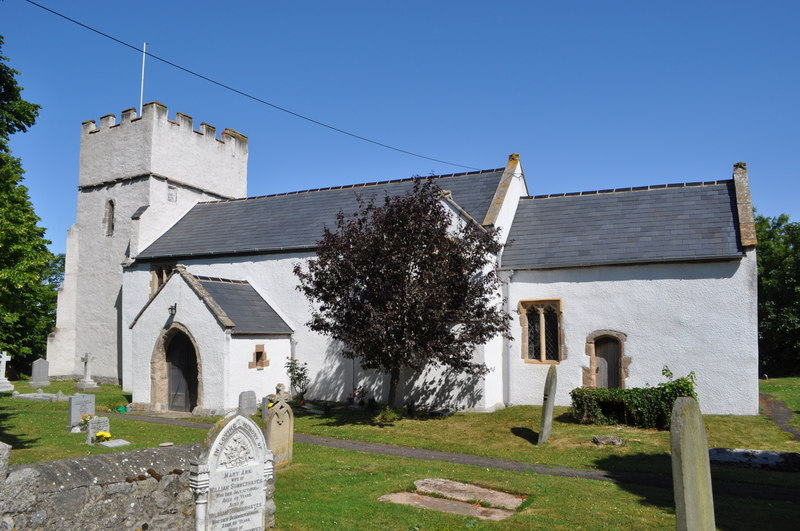
Church of St Mary

The Church of St Mary dates back to the 14th century. In the vestry is one remaining carved arch of the ancient screen. The tower has recently had a considerable amount of restorative work done on it, and is now rendered and painted a shade of off-white, as the whole church was until the early years of the 20th century. Since 1969 it has been designated a Grade II* listed building.

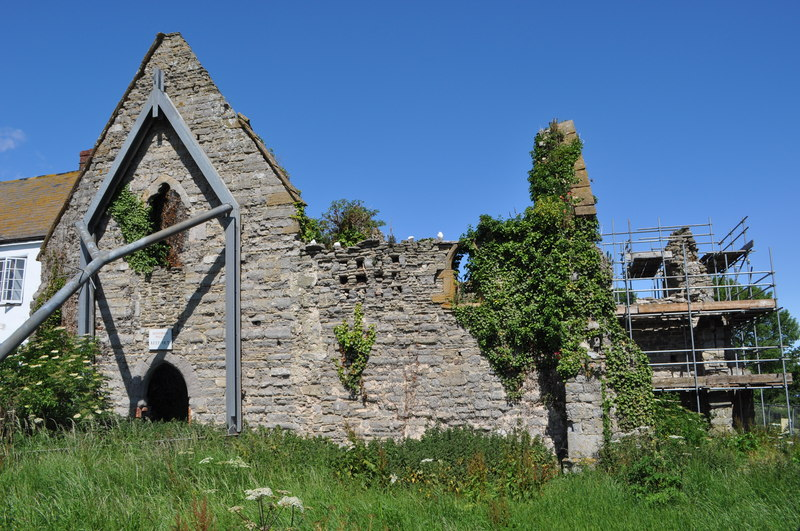
Ruin of the Chantry

Kilve Chantry was founded in 1329, when a brotherhood of five monks was employed to say Mass for their founder, Simon de Furneaux. The Roll of Incumbents shows that several successive chantry priests were incumbents of Kilve parish. The chantry seems to have fallen into a ruin long before the dissolution of the monasteries, and for centuries it served as a barn for the adjacent farm. The building stayed in use for many years, possibly by smugglers, until a fire in 1848. It is now listed on English Heritage's Heritage at Risk register as "very bad" with a priority rating of "A", the highest possible.

== Blue Ben ==
Kilve is said to have once been home to a dragon called Blue Ben. The skull of a fossilised Ichthyosaur on display in the local museum is sometimes pointed out as belonging to Blue Ben.

== Cultural references ==
The video to Bryan Adams' hit song "(Everything I Do) I Do It for You" was filmed on Kilve beach showing geological cliff formations.
