= Shobdon Priory =

Former priory in Shobdon, Herefordshire, England

Coordinates: 52.2601°N 2.8777°W

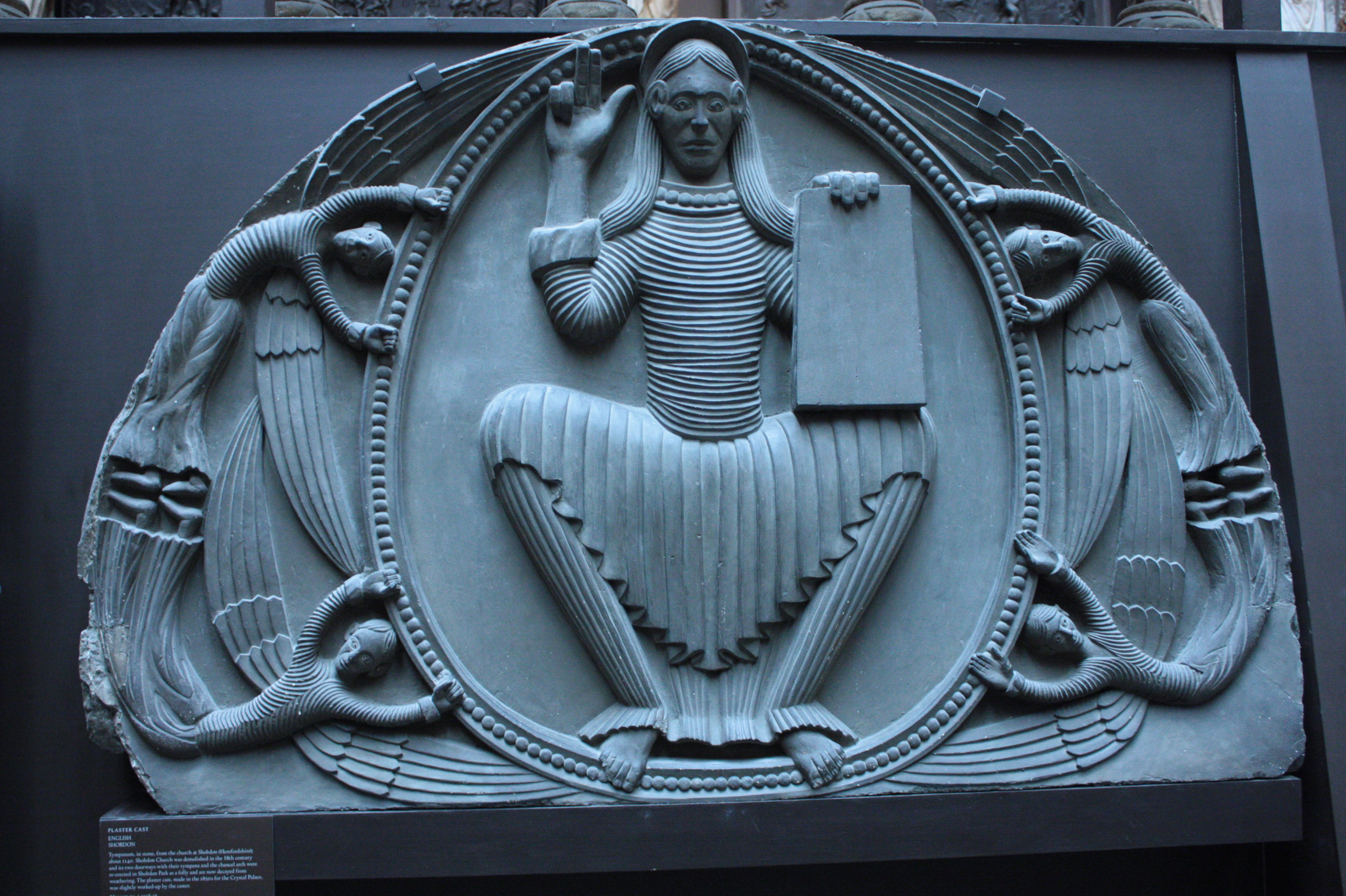
The bizarre tympanum from Shobdon Priory, Victoria and Albert Museum, London

Shobdon Priory was a priory in Herefordshire, England at grid reference SO40106284.

The church dated from 1140 and was demolished in the 18th century.
