= Sock Dennis =

Former civil parish in Somerset, England

Coordinates: 50.9895°N 2.6903°W

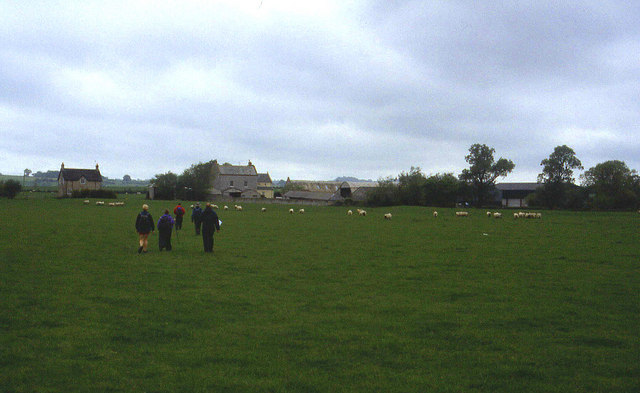
- Sock Dennis Farm

- Location within Somerset
- Civil parish: Ilchester; Tintinhull
- Unitary authority: Somerset
- Ceremonial county: Somerset
- Region: South West
- Country: England
- Sovereign state: United Kingdom

Sock Dennis is a former civil parish, now in the parishes of Ilchester and Tintinhull, in Somerset, England.

== History ==
In the Domesday Book of 1086 the manor of Sock Dennis was in the possession of Robert, Count of Mortain. From the mid-13th century it was described as a manor, but by the end of the 18th century it was "an obliterated place". The place name derives from "Sock", probably an area of marsh or streams, and the family name of the successors of William the Dane, a 12th-century owner. The family of Dennis was apparently of Danish origin, and was recorded in early Norman charters in French as le Deneys, meaning "The Dane", which was frequently Latinised by scribes as Dacus, being the adjectival form of Dacia, the mediaeval Latin for Denmark, thus "Danish".

There is an area of well-preserved ridge and furrow earthworks over three fields to the east of Sock Dennis.

There was a church in the village of Sock Dennis in 1286. It was a daughter church of Yeovil. In 1297 the church was worth £7 15s. The church had disappeared by 1575. A doorway, probably of the early 16th century, and perhaps forming part of the fabric of the church, is incorporated in one of the buildings of Sock Dennis farm, which is all that now remains of the village.

In 1861 Sock Dennis's total population was 26. In 1901 it was 22. By 1951 the population was 23.

After the church in Sock Dennis was destroyed, and the place was almost depopulated, it lost its parochial rights. In 1884 it was reduced, in order to enlarge the parish of Tintinhull. On 1 April 1957 the parish was abolished and 401 acres (1.62 km^{2}) with a population of 11 people transferred to Ilchester parish and 287 acres (1.16 km^{2}) and 12 people transferred to Tintinhull parish.
