= Austin Friary, Bristol =

English friary for Augustinian monks

- Location within Bristol

General information
- Architectural style: monastic
- Location: Bristol, England
- Coordinates: 51.450283°N 2.584094°W
- Construction started: 13th century
- Demolished: 16th century

Austin Friary was an Augustinian friary in Bristol, England. It was established in 1313, when Simon de Montecute gave 100 square feet (9.3 m^{2}) of land within the Temple Gate of Bristol. Further gifts of land were made by William de Montecute and Thomas of Berkeley during the next thirty years.

The monks constructed a pipe to supply themselves with water from a reservoir on the west bank of the Avon. This reservoir was fed from a spring, Ravenswell, in the cliff rising to Totterdown from the Avon. The pipe remained in use for water supply to the Temple district until the nineteenth century.

The prior and six remaining friars surrendered the friary and the remaining furniture and vestments to commissioner Richard Yngworth in 1538, during the Dissolution of the Monasteries.

No traces of the buildings survive today. The area has been extensively redeveloped since the eighteenth century and is now occupied by the headquarters of Bristol & West, a commercial bank which is a subsidiary of the Bank of Ireland.

== Works cited ==
- Weare, George Edward (1893). A Collectanea relating to the Bristol Friars Minors (Gray Friars) and their convent: together with a concise history of the dissolution of the houses of the four orders of mendicant friars in Bristol. Bristol: W. Bennett.
