= Kilve Chantry =

Ruined chantry chapel in Kilve, Somerset, England

Coordinates: 51.1889°N 3.2229°W

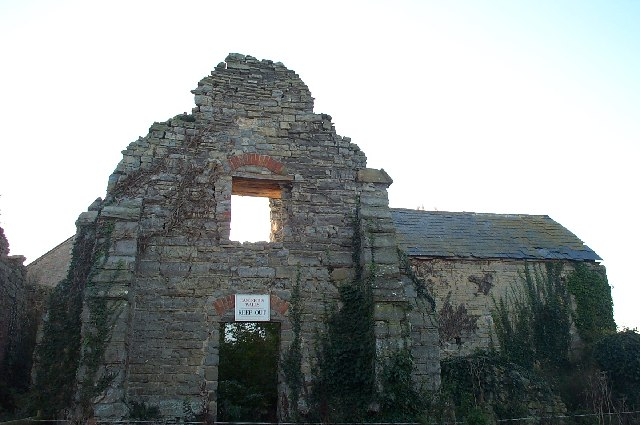
- Interactive map of Kilve Chantry

Monastery information
- Established: 1329
- Disestablished: Late 14th century

People
- Founder: Simon de Furneaux

Site
- Location: Kilve, Somerset, England
- Grid reference: ST146440

Kilve Chantry shown within Somerset
(grid reference ST146440)

Kilve Chantry was a religious site in Kilve, Somerset, England.

The Chantry was founded in 1329, when a brotherhood of five monks was employed to say Mass for their founder, Simon de Furneaux. The Roll of Incumbents shows that several successive chantry priests were incumbents of Kilve parish. It was dissolved in the late 14th century. The chantry seems to have fallen into a ruin long before the dissolution of the chantries, and for centuries it served as a barn for the adjacent farm.

The building stayed in use for many years, possibly by smugglers, until a fire in 1848, caused by an attempt to destroy evidence of contraband brandy. Some parts of the chantry complex have survived intact and are now 'Chantry' and 'Priory Cottages', but the large solar wing is now ruined.

It is now a Grade II* listed building and Scheduled Ancient Monument, which is listed on English Heritage's Heritage at Risk Register as "very bad" with a priority rating of "A", the highest possible.
