= Ilchester Friary =

Coordinates: 51.0017°N 2.6874°W

Monastery information
- Order: Dominican
- Established: Between 1221 and 1260
- Disestablished: 1538

Site
- Location: Ilchester, Somerset, England
- Grid reference: ST519226

Ilchester Friary shown within Somerset
(grid reference ST519226)

Ilchester Friary was founded between 1221 and 1260 as a Dominican monastery in Ilchester Somerset, England.

The buildings were restored in the 13th and 14th centuries until the site occupied a 1.6 hectares (4.0 acres) site, and by the 15th century it extended beyond the town walls.

It is believed to be the birthplace of Roger Bacon, possibly in 1213 or 1214.

It was dissolved in 1538, as part of the dissolution of the monasteries, but the buildings continued to be used, as a silk mill and relief prison, particularly for Quakers, until it was finally demolished in the early 19th century.
