= Ilchester Nunnery =

Coordinates: 51.0035°N 2.6860°W

- Interactive map of Ilchester Nunnery

Monastery information
- Order: Augustinian
- Established: 1217–1220
- Disestablished: 1463

Site
- Location: Ilchester, Somerset, England
- Grid reference: ST520228

Ilchester Nunnery shown within Somerset
(grid reference ST520228)

Ilchester Nunnery, in Ilchester, Somerset, England, was founded around 1217–1220 as the "White Hall Hospital of the Holy Trinity", (Latin: Alba Aula, French: Blanche Halle/Blanchesale) after the gift of a house and other property by William "The Dane" of Sock Dennis manor, Ilchester (Norman-French: Le Deneis etc., Latinised to Dacus (the adjectival form of Dacia being mediaeval Latin for Denmark) modernised to "Dennis"). From this family was probably descended the influential Denys family of Devon, (arms; three Danish battle axes) seated at Orleigh in the 16th century. By 1281, it had been converted into an Augustinian nunnery.

In the early 14th century concerns were raised about the management of the nunnery and the poverty of the nuns. The building was expanded in 1370. By 1463 the nunnery had been dissolved and its chapel become a free chapel, which itself was dissolved in 1548.

A ruined building still existed in 1791 but the stone was then used to build the nearby Castle Farm.

== Prioresses ==
- Alice Atteyerde, 1315
- Alice de Chilthorne, 1316
- Cecilia de Draycote, 1325
- Mary, 1370
- Matilda, occurs 1377
- Margaret, otherwise Marjory, 1377
- Christina, 1423
