= Ilchester =

Village and civil parish in Somerset, England

Coordinates: 51.0011°N 2.6825°W

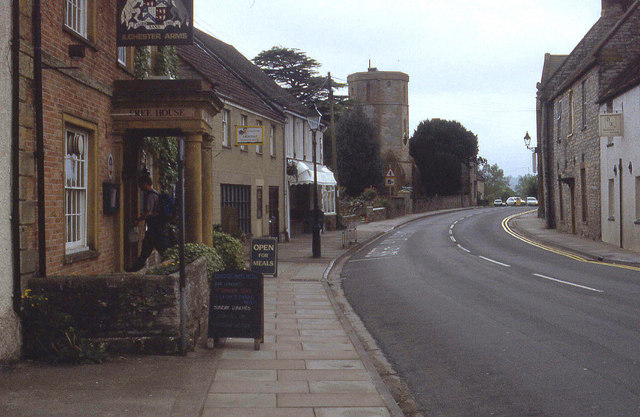

- Location within Somerset
- Population: 2,153 (2011)
- OS grid reference: ST522226
  - London: 124 mi (200 km) ENE
- Unitary authority: Somerset Council
- Ceremonial county: Somerset
- Region: South West
- Country: England
- Sovereign state: United Kingdom
- Post town: YEOVIL
- Postcode district: BA22
- Dialling code: 01935
- Police: Avon and Somerset
- Fire: Devon and Somerset
- Ambulance: South Western
- UK Parliament: Glastonbury and Somerton

Ilchester is a village and civil parish, situated on the River Yeo or Ivel, five miles (eight kilometres) north of Yeovil, in the English county of Somerset. Originally a Roman town, and later a market town, Ilchester has a rich medieval history and was a notable settlement in the county; around the 12th and 13th centuries it was effectively the county town. It had, however, declined in size and importance by the beginning of the 18th century, and the last markets were held in 1833. In 1889 the historic corporation that had governed the town (the Bailiff and Burgesses) was dissolved.

Ilchester is alternatively called Ivelchester (after the River Ivel) and previously an electoral ward of South Somerset District Council was named Ivelchester.

== Geography ==
The parish, which includes the hamlet of Ilchester Mead, the former village of Sock Dennis or Stock-Dennis, and the old parish of Northover, has a population of 2,153. Sock Dennis lies on the Monarch's Way long-distance footpath.

The A303 road once passed through the village but now runs via a dual carriageway bypass just to the west.

The village of Yeovilton lies 1 1/2 miles (2.5 kilometres) to the east of Ilchester. RNAS Yeovilton continues to be a notable Royal Naval Air Station.

== History ==
=== Roman times ===
In the Roman period, the place was named Lindinis and was the site of a fort and then a town on the Fosse Way. Finds from a large 4th-century cemetery at Northover House suggest Christian worship. It eventually served as one of two regional capitals for the Durotriges tribe.

=== Medieval times ===
The place-name 'Ilchester' is first attested in the Domesday Book of 1086, where it appears as Givelcestre. The name means 'Roman fort on the River Yeo'.

There is evidence of continuous occupation of Ilchester despite the Roman withdrawal from Britain around 410. Ilchester has been associated with the Cair Pensa vel Coyt listed among the 28 cities of Britain by the History of the Britons, on the basis that it should be read as an Old Welsh form of 'Penselwood' (coit being Welsh for "forest"), although others view it as three separate words: Pensa or Coyt. Bishop Ussher believed the listing referred to Exeter instead.

Around the year 1000, there was a mint at Ilchester, which was moved to South Cadbury following attacks by the Danes, and prior to the Siege of Ilchester in 1088.

The parish of Ilchester was part of the Tintinhull Hundred.

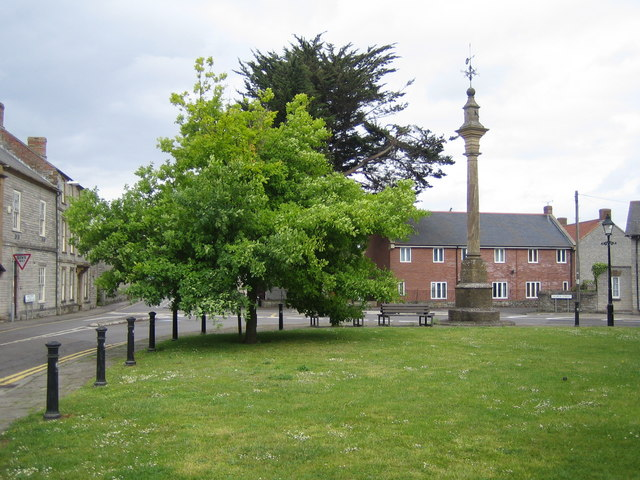
The old market place in Ilchester

Ilchester Friary was founded between 1221 and 1260 as a Dominican monastery. The buildings were restored in the 13th and 14th centuries until the site occupied a 1.6-hectare (4-acre) site, and by the 15th century it extended beyond the town walls. It is believed to be the birthplace of Roger Bacon, possibly in 1213 or 1214. It was dissolved in 1538, as part of the dissolution of the monasteries, but the buildings continued to be used, as a silk mill and relief prison, particularly for Quakers, until it was finally demolished in the early 19th century.

Ilchester Nunnery was founded around 1217–1220 originally as White Hall Hospital (Latin: Alba Aula, French: Blanche Halle/Blanche Salle) and, by 1281, had been converted into an Augustinian nunnery. The original White Hall hospital had been created after the gift of a house and other property by William "The Dane" (Norman-French: Le Deneis etc., Latinised to Dacus {not in the least bit related to Dacia}, modernised to "Dennis") of Sock Dennis. From a branch of this family was possibly descended the influential Denys family of Devon, (arms: three Danish battle axes) seated at Orleigh, near Buckland Brewer, Devon, from the 12th to 17th centuries In the early 14th century concerns were raised about the management of the nunnery and the poverty of the nuns. The building was expanded in 1370. The nunnery was dissolved in 1463 and the chapel become a free chapel, which itself was dissolved in 1548. A ruined building still existed in 1791, but the stone was then used to build the nearby Castle Farm.

Ilchester was a base for Henry III of England for a short period in 1250.

During the 12th century it was the county town of Somerset. The town has a 13th-century mace with three kings and an angel on it, which is the oldest staff of office in England. It can be seen at Ilchester Museum, which is located at the Town Hall House.

=== Later times ===
In July 1645 during the English Civil War, Ilchester was the scene of several skirmishes between Royalist and Parliamentary forces fighting for control of the bridges over the River Parrett and River Yeo before the Battle of Langport.

In 1795 work began on the Ivelchester and Langport Navigation, a canal linking Ilchester with Langport, but the scheme was soon bankrupted.

From 1621 to 1832, Ilchester was a Parliamentary constituency and a notorious rotten borough. Ilchester was the parliamentary seat of Sir William Manners (later Lord Huntingtower) in 1803 and 1806; however, it is said that he maintained his position by demolishing the houses of his opponents and putting them in the workhouse which meant they were not able to vote. When his son was not elected in 1818 he demolished the workhouse. He was succeeded as Member of Parliament by the Irish playwright Richard Brinsley Sheridan, author of The School for Scandal.

In 1962 the Ilchester Cheese Company was formed.

== Governance ==
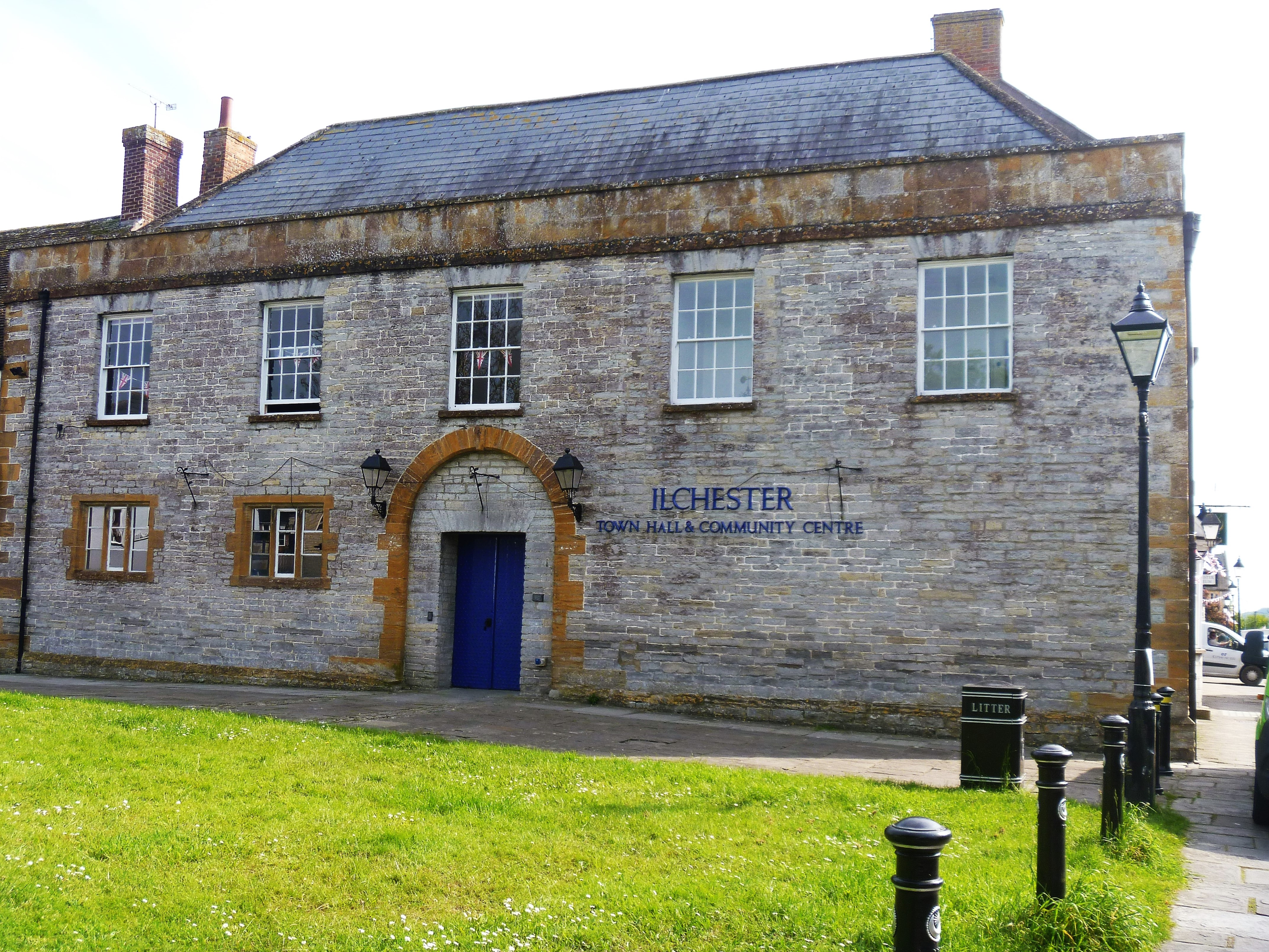
Ilchester Town Hall

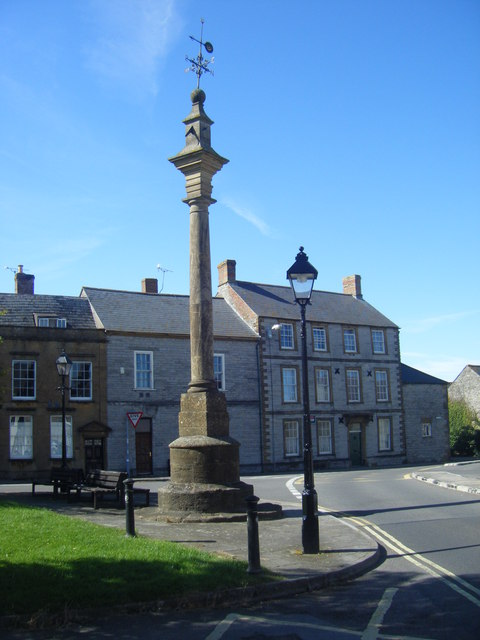
The Market Cross

The parish council has responsibility for local issues, including setting an annual precept (local rate) to cover the council's operating costs and producing annual accounts for public scrutiny. The parish council evaluates local planning applications and works with the local police, district council officers, and neighbourhood watch groups on matters of crime, security, and traffic. The parish council's role also includes initiating projects for the maintenance and repair of parish facilities, as well as consulting with the district council on the maintenance, repair, and improvement of highways, drainage, footpaths, public transport, and street cleaning. Conservation matters (including trees and listed buildings) and environmental issues are also the responsibility of the council.

For local government purposes, since 1 April 2023, the parish comes under the unitary authority of Somerset Council. Prior to this, it was part of the non-metropolitan district of South Somerset (established under the Local Government Act 1972). It was part of Yeovil Rural District before 1974.

The parish is in the 'Ivelchester' electoral ward. Ilchester is the most populous area of the ward but this stretches south east to Mudford. The total population of this ward taken at the 2011 census was 4,319.

It is also part of the Glastonbury and Somerton county constituency represented in the House of Commons of the Parliament of the United Kingdom. It elects one Member of Parliament (MP) by the first past the post system of election.

=== Ilchester Town Trust ===
Separate from the parish council, the Ilchester Town Trust repairs and manages Ilchester Town Hall, as well as providing for charitable purposes for the inhabitants of Ilchester. As well as the Town Hall, the Trust has ownership of the Roman cemetery in Northover and the Ilchester sportsfield. The Trust was established in 1889, upon the dissolution of the historic corporation that had governed the town (the Bailiff and Burgesses). The Trust also manages the Ilchester Museum which is based in the Town Hall House, behind Ilchester Town Hall.

== Religious sites ==
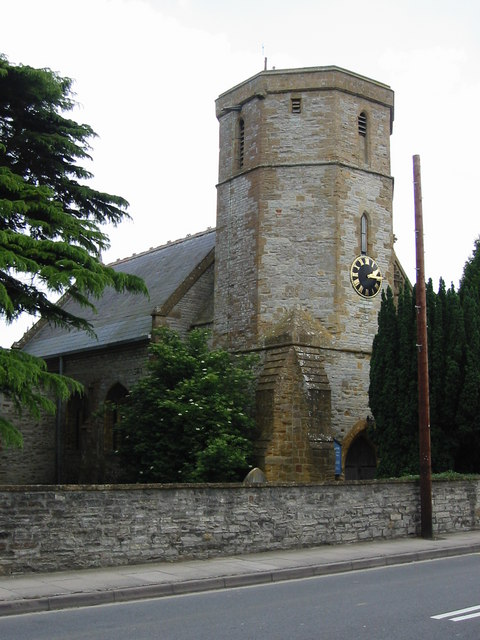
Church of St Mary Major, Ilchester.

Ilchester had at least eight churches in medieval times of which two remain. The church of St Mary Major dates from the 13th century and is a Grade II* listed building, as is the Church of St Andrew which is slightly more recent, although it may stand on the site of an earlier Roman building and associated cemetery. St Andrew's is in the care of the Churches Conservation Trust.

== Education ==
Ilchester Community Primary School consists of a Junior school and an Infant school, which cover key stage 1 and key stage 2 of the national curriculum. Both parts of the school are separate, each having a deputy head of year. The school has 295 pupils enrolled. The school was awarded Healthy school status in the summer of 2007. Ilchester has a few Pre-schools and a Nursery. Heron Pre-School provision was rated as good by OFSTED in 2010. St Mary's Pre-School, Ilchester has been in existence for around 40 years. It is located in the heart of the village, in the Church Rooms next to St Mary Major, its most recent Ofsted was in 2012 where it was rated as GOOD, particularly in safeguarding and relationships with parents.

== Notable people from Ilchester ==
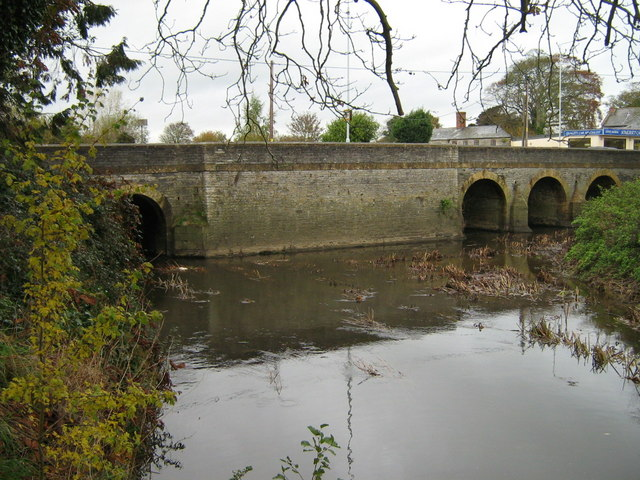
Bridge over the River Yeo

- Richard of Ilchester (died 1188), a medieval English statesman and prelate.
- Roger Bacon (c.1219/20 – c.1292), a medieval polymath, philosopher, scientist, theologian, Franciscan friar and medieval scientist,, also known as Doctor Mirabilis.
- William Arnold (1587–c.1676), a founding settler of the Colony of Rhode Island and Providence Plantations, one of the thirteen original proprietors of Providence, and was one of the twelve founding members of the first Baptist Church in America.
- Thomas Lockyer (MP) (1699-1785), businessman and local MP, 1747-1761.

== Historic estates ==
- Brooke, Ilchester, the earliest known seat of the prominent Brooke family, Barons Cobham.
- Sock Dennis
