= Sir Benjamin Slade, 7th Baronet =

British aristocrat (born 1946)

- Born: 1945/1946; Nether Stowey, Somerset, England
- Other name: Sir Ben Slade
- Education: Millfield
- Occupation: Aristocrat • businessman
- Years active: 1962–present
- Spouse: Pauline Myburgh (m. 1977; div. 1991)
- Partners: Fiona Aitken (1990s); Kirsten Hughes (1995–2011); Bridget Convey (2016–2017); Sahara Sunday Spain (2020–2021)
- Children: 1
- Father: Sir Michael Nial Slade, 6th Baronet
- Relatives: Herbert Cayzer, 2nd Baron Rotherwick (brother-in-law); Robin Cayzer, 3rd Baron Rotherwick (nephew); Charles Cayzer (nephew); Claude Myburgh (father-in-law)
- Family: Slade baronets

Sir Benjamin Julian Alfred Slade, 7th Baronet (born 1945/1946) is a British aristocrat, businessman, and self-publicist, who is a member of the Slade baronets. He lives at Maunsel House in Somerset, England.

Slade is the current holder of the Slade baronets, created in 1831 for his great-great-great-grandfather General Sir John Slade, 1st Baronet. In 2017, an employment tribunal found that he had unfairly dismissed and discriminated against two pregnant employees.

== Early life and family ==
Slade was born into an aristocratic family in Nether Stowey, Somerset, England in 1945/1946. His birth was registered in Bridgwater. His father, Sir Michael Nial Slade, 6th Baronet, was a British Army officer. His mother, Angela Clare Rosalind (née Chichester), was a housewife. His parents married at St Peter's Church, Shirwell on 7 May 1928. He had two elder siblings. His sister, Sarah Jane (née Slade), was a socialite, who married aristocrat Herbert Cayzer, 2nd Baron Rotherwick, from the Cayzer baronets, in 1952, and became known as The Right Honourable Baroness Sarah Jane Rotherwick; Lady Rotherwick died on 2 August 1978, aged 47. His nephews are Robin Cayzer, 3rd Baron Rotherwick, a landowner and estate manager, and former peer, and Charles Cayzer, a billionaire businessman.

Slade was educated at Millfield, a public school, in Street, Somerset.

Slade inherited his baronetcy on the death of his father, on 15 April 1962, aged 61, from a heart attack. He was 15 years old at the time of his succession. He is commonly referred to as Sir Ben Slade. He lives at Maunsel House in the North Petherton town in Somerset, England. His brother, Robert Orlando Michael Cuthbert Slade, died in an accident on 15 March 1958, aged 21, predeceasing their father. His mother died from cirrhosis of the liver due to chronic alcoholism on 4 September 1959, aged 50. He said that he was "orphaned at 15" and was raised by his aunt, Lady Freda Mary Slade (née Meates), a socialite, who was the wife of his paternal uncle, Sir Alfred Fothringham Slade, 5th Baronet.

== Public image ==
Slade appeared in the Sky Atlantic programme The Guest Wing, about owners of country houses. The episode aired in April 2012.

Slade appeared on the ITV daytime magazine programme This Morning in April 2017, where he was interviewed by Eamonn Holmes and Ruth Langsford. During the episode, he launched a public mission to find his second wife. In January 2018, he made a second appearance on the programme, where he was interviewed by Phillip Schofield and Holly Willoughby.

Slade appeared on the ITV breakfast television programme Good Morning Britain in September 2018, where he was interviewed by Charlotte Hawkins, Ben Shephard and Kate Garraway.

Slade appeared on the Channel 4 reality television programme Handcuffed: Last Pair Standing in March 2026. He caused controversy in his appearance, clashing with his partner over his support of Nigel Farage, and ownership of controversial art pieces including a painting by Adolf Hitler.

=== Practices as employer ===
Slade was found in 2017 by an employment tribunal to have unfairly dismissed and egregiously discriminated against two women who worked for him and who became pregnant within a few weeks of each other. They were awarded compensation for unfair dismissal, lost earnings and discrimination, totalling £179,500.

== Personal life ==
Slade married socialite Pauline Carol Myburgh—younger child of cricketer and British Army officer Major Claude Myburgh and his second wife, Diana—at St James's Church, Piccadilly on 26 May 1977. The couple separated in 1989, after 12 years of marriage. The Slades' divorce was finalised in the London Divorce Court in 1991, after 14 years of marriage. He claimed that Myburgh's 17 cats were an impediment to their marriage. His ex-wife has never remarried, thus taking the style, as a divorced wife of a baronet, "Pauline, Lady Slade".

Slade was in a relationship with socialite Fiona Aitken, wife of George Herbert, 8th Earl of Carnarvon, for a few years during the 1990s. From 1995 to 2011, his partner was actress Kirsten Hughes, until she "ran off with the Maunsel House handyman". In 2017, he separated from his partner, domestic worker Bridget Convey, because, at the age of 50, she had become too old to supply him with an heir. In the same year, he advertised for a wife, citing that she should have a shotgun licence, a driving license, a coat of arms, and be young enough to have sons. He rejects candidates from countries beginning with an 'I' or with green in the flag (with the exception of Italian and northern Indian women), Scots, lesbians, and communists.

Slade has a child with American poet Sahara Sunday Spain, a daughter named Violet, born in 2021. He has never met his daughter, however, he has acknowledged her existence. He is still looking for a male heir with similar genetics to one of his further paternal ancestors, who will take an interest in running the estate and to whom he will leave it in trust.

== Coat of arms ==
Coat of arms of Sir Benjamin Slade, 7th Baronet
Crest On a mount Vert a horse’s head erased Sable encircled with a chain in form of an arch Gold. Escutcheon Per fess Argent and Sable a pale counterchanged and three horse’s heads erased two and one of the second on a chief Ermine two bombs fired Proper. Motto Fidus Et Audax (below), A Bon Droit (above)

Baronetage of the United Kingdom
Preceded by Michael Nial Slade	Baronet (of Maunsell Grange); 1962 – present	Incumbent
