= Cayzer =

Cayzer is a surname. Notable people with the surname include:

- Charles Cayzer (disambiguation), several people
- August Cayzer (1876–1943), English shipowner
- Cayzer baronets
- Geoff Cayzer (born 1945), Australian rules footballer
- Lindy W. Cayzer (born 1952), Australian botanist
- Nigel Cayzer (1954–2026), British businessman
