= The Adventures of Jane =

1949 British film by Edward G. Whiting

- Chrystabel Leighton-Porter with Fritz
- Directed by: Edward G. Whiting
- Written by: Alfred J. Goulding; Con West; Edward G. Whiting
- Based on: Jane of the Daily Mirror
- Produced by: Edward G. Whiting
- Starring: Chrystabel Leighton-Porter
- Music by: Edward Stanelli
- Distributed by: Eros Films
- Release date: 1949
- Running time: 60 minutes
- Country: England
- Language: English

The Adventures of Jane is a 1949 British comedy film directed by Edward G. Whiting and starring Chrystabel Leighton-Porter and Michael Hogarth. It was written by Alfred Goulding, Con West and Whiting, adapted from the stage show based on the comic strip Jane originally created by Norman Pett.

== Plot ==
On the last night of her act at the Gaiety Theatre, Jane meets Snade, her supposed fan. He gives her a diamond bracelet, saying it is a "token of his appreciation". Jane, unsuspecting, gladly accepts his gift. Later that evening, she is visited by Tom, an old friend. She tells him that she is judging a beauty contest at the Tudor Close Hotel in Brighton. He agrees to join her.

The next morning at the railway station Jane has one of her iconic wardrobe malfunctions and is left in only her underwear. She is rescued by Captain Cleaver (who, unknown to Jane, is the leader of a gang of diamond smugglers) who lends her his coat. Before the beauty contest, Tom takes Jane to dinner. There, he tells her that he is on a 'special job' in Brighton and is after a gang of diamond smugglers. He also tells her that her bracelet is only paste. Tom becomes increasingly jealous of Cleaver during the evening, and is angry when Jane agrees to go on a date with Cleaver on his yacht. The next morning, Cleaver discreetly exchanges the central diamond in the bracelet for one his friends have smuggled into England. So when Jane goes through customs, the diamond is not suspected. Afterwards, he tries to steal it back, but failing to do so, he and his friends decide that they must kidnap both Jane and the bracelet.

They lure Jane and Fritz to a remote cottage, but unknown to the gang, Jane had already given the bracelet to Ruby, Cleaver's long-suffering girlfriend. After putting an SOS in Fritz's collar, Jane smuggles him out and tells him to go back to the inn and to get help. Back at the inn, Tom discovers one of the spivs searching Jane's room for the bracelet, but gets knocked out by the criminal before he can raise the alarm. Meanwhile, Snade sees Ruby wearing the diamonds. He snatches them and makes his way to Cleaver's cottage. Realising that the police are on their track, Cleaver and his gang clear out of the cottage, taking Jane with them, but they throw her out of the car soon afterwards. Snade who is also being chased by the police, decides to destroy the evidence and throws the bracelet out of the car window. Jane, who is composing herself at the bottom of the embankment where she had been thrown has the diamond bracelet fall (literally) into her lap. Cleaver, Snade and the rest of the gang continue to be chased until they are cornered by the police.

== Cast ==
- Chrystabel Leighton-Porter as Jane Gay (credited as "Jane")
- Fritz the dog as himself
- Michael Hogarth as Tom Hawke
- Ian Colin as Captain Cleaver
- Sonya O'Shea as Ruby
- Edward Stanelli as the hotel manager (credited as "Stanelli")
- Wally Patch as the customs official
- Peter Butterworth as the drunken man
- Norman Pett as himself
- Sebastian Cabot as foreign traveller
- Sidney Benson as Mr Sneyed
- Charles Irwin as Lew
- George Crawford as Freddie
- Joan Grindley as maid

== Production ==
The film was shot entirely in Brighton and the surrounding countryside. The inn at the centre of the storyline was filmed at the Tudor Close hotel in Rottingdean, Sussex.

The film had an extremely low budget, even recruiting Leighton-Porter's husband Arthur to be an extra. Chrystabel Leighton-Porter later said: "It really was simply awful. I was no film actress, and the feeble plot and script didn't help much either!"

== Reception ==
Picturegoer wrote: "A very poor comedy-drama featuring 'Jane', the cartoon girl, as a variety artist who is used by a crook to smuggle diamonds into England. Of course, the girl with the shapely legs does not play ball and exposes her exploiters. The acting does not amount to anything, nor does the story."

== DVD release ==
The Adventures Of Jane was released on a 2-in-1 disc with Murder at 3am in 2008, in region 2 format.

== Other adaptations of Jane ==
- Jane (BBC TV series, 1982, 1984)
- Jane and the Lost City (1987)
