= Mervyn Haisman =

British screenwriter (1928–2010)

- Born: Mervyn Oliver Haisman; 15 March 1928; London, England
- Died: 29 October 2010 (aged 82); Valencia, Spain
- Occupation: Screenwriter
- Notable work: Doctor Who

Mervyn Oliver Haisman (15 March 1928 – 29 October 2010) was a British screenwriter of film and television. Prior to this career he worked as an actor and managed a theatre company as well as working in insurance.

== Biography ==
Haisman was born in 1928 in London. An early television credit was an episode of Dr. Finlay's Casebook (1967) called The Forgotten Enemy. At about the same time he formed a writing partnership with Henry Lincoln, and together they were the authors of three 1960s Doctor Who stories during the Patrick Troughton years: The Abominable Snowmen, The Web of Fear and The Dominators. The latter script was their last contribution to the programme and, after disagreements with the production office, it was cut by an episode and credited to the pseudonym Norman Ashby. Haisman and Lincoln also worked together on episodes of Emergency Ward 10, but their writing partnership ended in the mid 1970s.

Haisman also wrote for many British television shows including The Onedin Line (on which he also worked as script editor), Howards' Way, and Swallows and Amazons Forever!; and on the horror movie Curse of the Crimson Altar, also known as The Crimson Cult (1968), again with Henry Lincoln.

Haisman provided script for the popular BBC series Jane (1982), starring Glynis Barber as the wartime comic strip pin up. He was to also write the second series Jane in the Desert (1984). The success of the TV series lead to Haisman writing for the movie Jane and the Lost City (1987), this time featuring Kirsten Hughes in the lead role.

=== Death ===
Although Haisman died at the end of October 2010, his death was not reported by media until 9 December. He died in Valencia, Spain.
