= Cayzer baronets of Roffey Park (1921) =

Escutcheon of the Cayzer baronets of Roffey Park (1921)

The Cayzer baronetcy, of Roffey Park in the County of Sussex, was created on 17 January 1921 for August Bernard Tellefsen Cayzer, the third son of Sir Charles Cayzer, 1st Baronet, of the 1904 creation.

His son, the 2nd Baronet, was created a life peer as Baron Cayzer, of St Mary Axe in the City of London. On his death in 1999, the baronetcy became extinct.

== Cayzer baronets, of Roffey Park (1921) ==
- Sir August Bernard Tellefsen Cayzer, 1st Baronet (1876–1943)
- Sir (William) Nicholas Cayzer, 2nd Baronet (1910–1999). Created Baron Cayzer in 1982, he left no heir.
