= Athelney Abbey =

Monastery in Somerset, England

Coordinates: 51.05930°N 2.93458°W

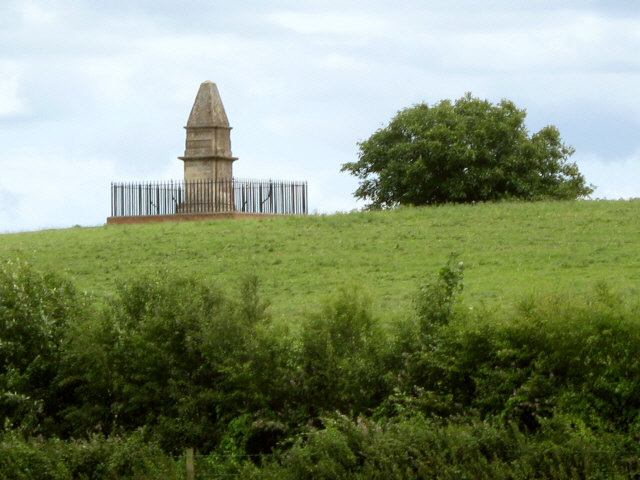

Monastery information
- Order: Benedictine
- Established: 888
- Disestablished: 1540

People
- Founder(s): King Alfred

Site
- Location: Athelney, Somerset, England
- Grid reference: ST346293

Athelney Abbey shown within Somerset
(grid reference ST346293)

Athelney Abbey, established in the county of Somerset, England, was founded by King Alfred in 888, as a religious house for monks of the Order of St. Benedict. It was dedicated to "Our Blessed Saviour, St. Peter, St. Paul, and St. Egelwine".

== History ==
=== Origins ===
Originally Athelney was a small island in swampland, in what is now the parish of East Lyng, covered with alders and infested by wild animals. It was inaccessible except by boat, according to William of Malmesbury. Here Alfred the Great found a refuge from the Danes; here he built the abbey. The dedication to St. Æthelwine suggests that it may have been an enlargement of a hermitage or monastery already in existence. He peopled it with foreign monks, drawn chiefly from France, with John the Old Saxon (known as Scotus) as their abbot. The original church was a small structure, consisting of four piers supporting the main fabric and surrounded by four circular chancels. The original charter from Alfred still exists.

=== Norman era ===
From the 11th century up to the time of its dissolution the monks of Glastonbury Abbey attempted to annex it or have it placed under the Glastonbury jurisdiction. The abbey also appears in the Domesday Book, and the Taxatio of 1291. In 1267, Henry III granted the abbey a weekly market on Mondays. However, it was not a rich community. An indulgence of thirty days was given in 1321 for those who should assist in the rebuilding of the church, and the monks petitioned Edward I of England to remit corrody for which they were unable to find the means of payment. The last abbot was Robert Hamlyn. With eight monks of his community, he surrendered February 8, 1540, receiving a pension of £50 per annum and retaining his prebend of Long Sutton. The revenues (26 Hen. VII) were £209. 0s. 3/4 d. Both the 1267 charter of Henry III, and latter Henry VII also still exist.

=== Abbots ===
List of the known abbots include:

- John, the 'Old Saxon,' temp.
- Seignus, occurs 937
- Alfric, occurs 1007
- Alfward
- Simon
- Athelward
- Athelwin, occurs 1020–5
- Ralph Maledoctus, occurs 1125
- Simon, occurs 1135
- Benedict I, occurs 1159
- Roger I, 1174–92
- Benedict II, 1198–1227
- Roger II, elected 1227
- Robert, elected 1245 occurs 1263
- Osmund de Reigny
- Richard de Derham, occurs 1267
- Andrew de Sancto Fonte, 1280–1300
- Osmund de Sowi, 1300–25
- Robert de Ile, 1325
- Richard de Gothurst or Cotehurst, 1341–9
- John Stoure, 23 September–22 October 1349
- Robert de Hache, elected 1349
- John Hewish, 1390
- John Brygge, 1399
- John Petherton, 1424
- Robert Hylle(Hill), 1458 & 1462
- Robert de Patient, 1481
- John George, 1485 & 1498
- John Wellington, 1503
- Richard Wraxall
- John Herte, 1518
- Thomas Sutton, 1527
- John Maior, 1531
- Robert Hamlyn or Hamblyn, 1533–9
- Robert Hamblyn, 1534
- Richard Wells 1539

=== Burials ===
- Æthelwine of Athelney

=== Post dissolution ===
Following the dissolution it was acquired for use as a private residence by Lord Audley who had the church demolished. Audley's plans never eventuated and records show that on 17 August 1544 Audley sold the abbey to John Clayton, for £182 15s. and in April 1545 Clayton obtained a licence to sell it to John Tynbere. In 1674 further demolition work occurred by labourers of the then landowner, Captain John Hucker. In this work, excavations dug-up the bases of the pillars of the church and also revealed graves, one being 8-foot in length.

With the church demolished and other buildings fallen into disrepair, nothing visible remains at the site today. Several geophysical surveys have been carried out to explore the remains which still exist below ground level. Today the site of the Abbey is marked by King Alfred's Monument which is a Grade II listed building, and Scheduled Ancient Monument. The monument was built in 1801 by Sir John Slade of Maunsel House, who owned Athelney farm.

The inscription on the monument reads as follows:

KING ALFRED THE GREAT
IN THE YEAR OF OUR LORD 879,
HAVING BEEN DEFEATED BY
THE DANES, FLED FOR REFUGE
TO THE FOREST OF ATHELNEY
WHERE HE LAY CONCEALED
FROM HIS ENEMIES FOR THE
SPACE OF A WHOLE YEAR.
HE SOON AFTER REGAINED
POSSESSION OF HIS THRONE
& IN GRATEFUL REMEMBRANCE
OF THE PROTECTION HE HAD
RECEIVED UNDER THE FAVOUR
OF HEAVEN, ERECTED A
MONASTERY ON THIS SPOT, &
ENDOWED IT WITH ALL THE
LANDS CONTAINED IN THE
ISLE OF ATHELNEY.
TO PERPETUATE THE MEMORIAL
OF SO REMARKABLE AN
INCIDENT IN THE LIFE OF
THAT ILLUSTRIOUS PRINCE.
THIS EDIFICE WAS FOUNDED
BY SIR JOHN SLADE ESQ OF
MANSEL, THE PROPRIETOR OF
ATHELNEY & LORD OF THE
MANOR OF NORTH PETHERTON.
AD 1801
