= Charles Cayzer =

Charles Cayzer may refer to:

- several of the Cayzer baronets, including:
  - Sir Charles Cayzer, 1st Baronet (1843–1916), British politician, MP for Barrow-in-Furness 1892–1906
  - Sir Charles Cayzer, 3rd Baronet (1896–1940), British politician, MP for Chester, 1922–1940
- Charles Cayzer (businessman, born 1957), son of Herbert Robin Cayzer, 2nd Baron Rotherwick
