= Robin Cayzer, 3rd Baron Rotherwick =

British peer

The Right Honourable The Lord Rotherwick
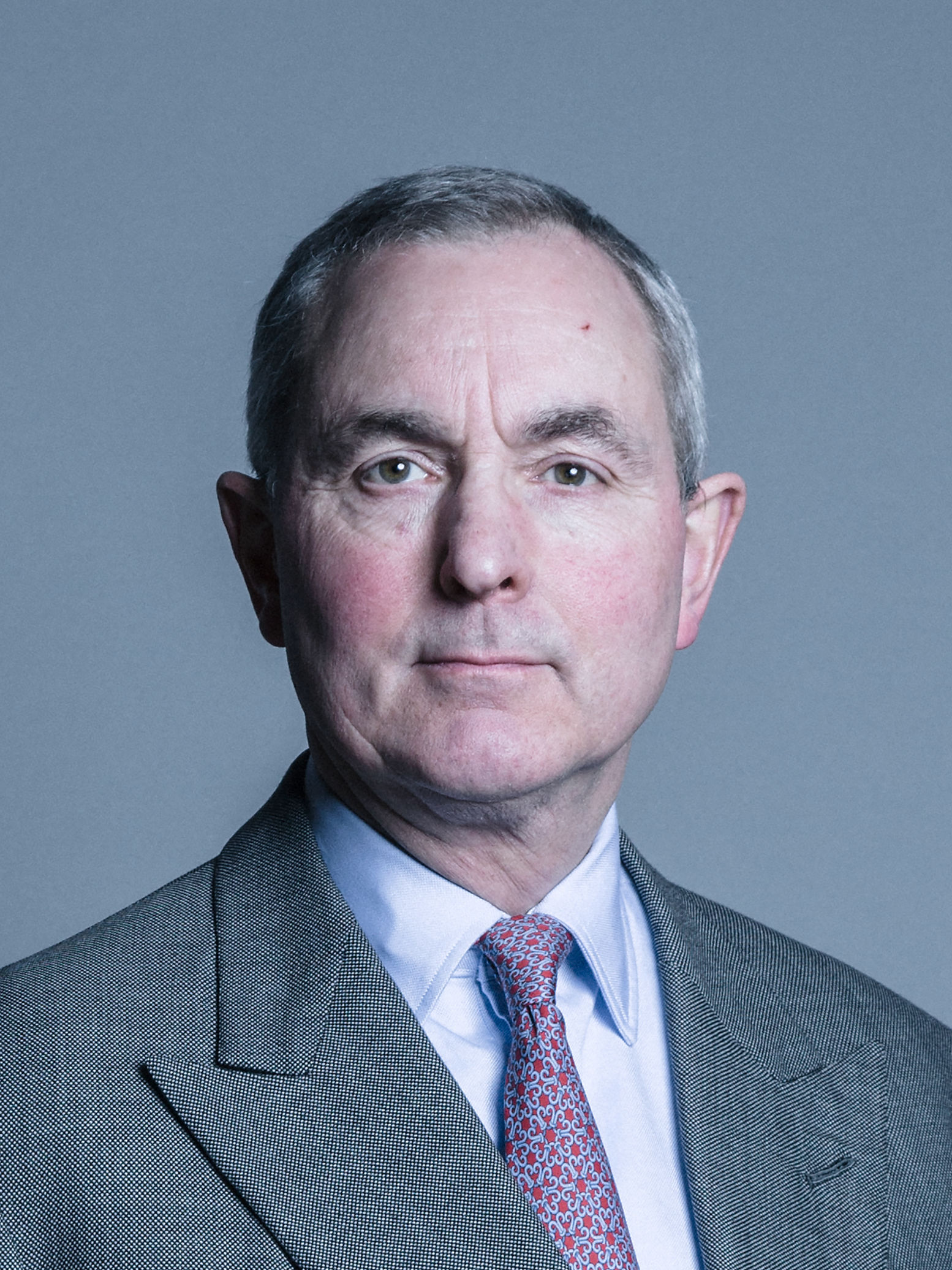

Member of the House of Lords
- Lord Temporal
- Hereditary peerage 30 July 1996 – 11 November 1999
- Preceded by: The 2nd Baron Rotherwick
- Succeeded by: Seat abolished
- Elected Hereditary Peer; 11 November 1999 – 1 February 2022
- Election: 1999
- Preceded by: Seat established
- Succeeded by: The 5th Viscount Camrose

Personal details
- Born: Herbert Robin Cayzer; 12 March 1954 (age 72) Tynley Hall
- Party: Conservative
- Spouses: Sara Jane McAlpine (m. 1982; div. 1994) Tania Jane Fox (m. 2000)
- Children: 5
- Education: Harrow School
- Alma mater: Royal Military Academy, Sandhurst; Royal Agricultural College, Cirencester

Herbert Robin Cayzer, 3rd Baron Rotherwick (born 12 March 1954), is a British landowner and estate manager. He sat as a hereditary peer in the House of Lords for the Conservative Party, from 1996 until his retirement in 2022.

== Early life ==
Robin Cayzer was born on 12 March 1954. He is the son of Herbert Cayzer, 2nd Baron Rotherwick (1912–1996), chairman of Caledonia Investments and British and Commonwealth Shipping and a Major in the Scots Guards during the Second World War, and Sarah Jane (1933–1978), daughter of Sir Michael Nial Slade, 6th Baronet. He spent his early childhood at Bletchingdon Park, a Palladian country house in Oxfordshire. When he was 13, the family moved to Cornbury Park, in the same county, where he still lives.

He attended Harrow School and the Royal Military Academy, Sandhurst. He was further educated at the Royal Agricultural College, Cirencester, where he graduated with a Diploma in Agriculture (GDA) in 1982.

== Career ==
Between 1973 and 1976, Cayzer was Acting Captain of The Life Guards and between 1977 and 1983, of the Household Cavalry. He worked for Barings Bank from 1976 to 1978 and for Bristol Helicopters from 1978 to 1980.

A qualified pilot, he represented the Popular Flying Association as a member of the executive committee from 1997 to 2001, and as vice-chairman from 1999 to 2001. He is also president of the General Aviation Awareness Council and a director of the Light Aviation Association.

In 1996, he succeeded to his father's peerage title, and took up his seat in Britain's upper chamber as a Conservative. The passing of the House of Lords Act 1999 saw him elected as one of the 92 hereditary peers to remain in their seats for life. His areas of interest are listed as agriculture, animals, food and rural affairs; aviation; defence; energy and environment.

In 2005, he became a Fellow of the Industry and Parliament Trust. He belongs to the All Party Parliamentary Group for Motorcycling. He is also a Patron of the National Association for Bikers with a Disability.

Since 2004, he has been board director of Cayzer Continuation PCC Ltd and since 2006, non-active chairman of Air Touring Ltd. According to his register of interests on the House of Lords website, he is a director of Cornbury Estates Company Limited and Cornbury Maintenance Company Ltd (both described as property companies) and of Bygone Engineering. Cornbury Park has about 5,000 acres of land, including part of the old royal forest of Wychwood. Cayzer has developed business units for rental there, and hosts the Wilderness Festival music festival.

== Personal life ==
On 6 March 1982, Cayzer married Sara Jane, daughter of Robert James McAlpine (great-grandson of Sir Robert McAlpine, 1st Baronet, civil engineer and founder of Sir Robert McAlpine Ltd); they had three children before divorcing in 1994. On 21 June 2000, he married secondly Tania Jane, daughter of Christopher Fox; they have two children.

Lord Rotherwick succeeded to the Cayzer baronetcy of Gartmore on the death of his kinsman Sir James Arthur Cayzer, 5th Baronet, on 27 February 2012.

Rotherwick is the brother-in-law of Mark Carney, who was from 2013 to 2018 Governor of the Bank of England and is currently Prime Minister of Canada. (Carney's wife is environmental policy expert Diana Fox Carney, who is the sister of Rotherwick's wife Tania).

Parliament of the United Kingdom
New office created by the House of Lords Act 1999	Elected hereditary peer to the House of Lords under the House of Lords Act 1999; 1999–2022	Succeeded by The Viscount Camrose
Peerage of the United Kingdom
Preceded by Herbert Cayzer	Baron Rotherwick; 1996–present Member of the House of Lords (1996–1999)	Incumbent; Heir apparent: Hon. Herbert Cayzer
Baronetage of the United Kingdom
Preceded by James Cayzer	Baronet (of Gartmore); 2012–present	Incumbent; Heir apparent: Hon. Herbert Cayzer
