= Baron Rotherwick =

Barony in the Peerage of the United Kingdom

Baron Rotherwick, of Tylney in the County of Southampton, is a title in the Peerage of the United Kingdom.

== History ==
The title was created on 8 June 1939 for the shipping magnate and Conservative Member of Parliament, Sir Herbert Cayzer, 1st Baronet. He had previously represented Portsmouth South in the House of Commons. Before his elevation to the peerage, he had been created a baronet, of Tylney in the County of Southampton, on 29 January 1924. He was the fifth son of Sir Charles Cayzer, 1st Baronet, of Gartmore and the younger brother of Sir August Cayzer, 1st Baronet, of Roffey Park.

As of 2026 the titles are held by the 1st Baron's grandson, the 3rd Baron, who succeeded his father in 1996. He was one of the 92 elected hereditary peers that remained in the House of Lords after the passing of the House of Lords Act of 1999, and sat on the Conservative benches. He resigned on 1 February 2022.

The family seat is Cornbury Park, near Charlbury, Oxfordshire.

== Barons Rotherwick (1939) ==
- Herbert Robin Cayzer, 1st Baron Rotherwick (1881–1958)
- Herbert Robin Cayzer, 2nd Baron Rotherwick (1912–1996)
- (Herbert) Robin Cayzer, 3rd Baron Rotherwick (b. 1954)

The heir apparent is the present holder's son Hon. Herbert Robin Cayzer (b. 1989).

The 3rd Baron succeeded additionally (as 6th Baronet) to the Cayzer baronetcy of Gartmore on 27 February 2012.

Escutcheon of the Cayzer baronets of Tylney

Escutcheon of Cayzer, Baron Rotherwick

Escutcheon of the Cayzer baronets of Gartmore

== See also ==
- Cayzer baronets
