= Æthelwine of Athelney =

7th century Saint

Æthelwine of Athelney was a 7th-century saint venerated in the Roman Catholic and Eastern Orthodox churches. He lived as a hermit on the island of Athelney in the marsh country of Somerset, and is known to us through being recorded in the hagiography of the Secgan Manuscript. He was venerated as a saint after his death, Nov. 26.

== Etymology ==
His name is two Anglo Saxon words, æðel (prince) and wine (friend protector).

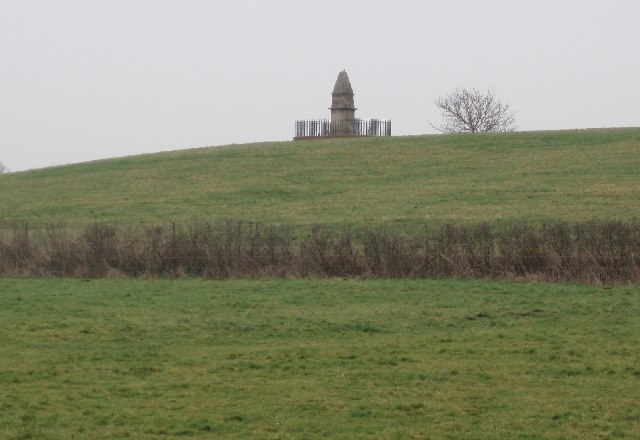
King Alfred's Monument

He takes his suffix from Athelney, the island where he lived. Athelney was made famous as the island fort in the Somerset marshes from where Alfred the Great launched his conquest of the Danes, two centuries after Æthelwine lived there. The Anglo-Saxon name of Athelney isle was "Æðelinga íeg", thought to mean the "Island of Princes" (æðeling) and as it had this name prior to Alfred it is possible that it derived from Æthelwine, or that it was an established royal residence, fort or refuge of some type. To give thanks for his victory, Alfred founded on the Isle in 888 AD, a monastery, Athelney Abbey.

== Personal life ==
Aethelwine was a son of Cynegils, king of the West Saxons from 611-42 AD and the brother of Cenwealh, king of the West Saxons from 642-672 AD.

William of Malmesbury says that he had a chronic disease.

== See also ==
- House of Wessex family tree
