= Alfred Jewel =

Quartz and gold Anglo-Saxon artefact

Coordinates: 51.374687°N 2.440724°W

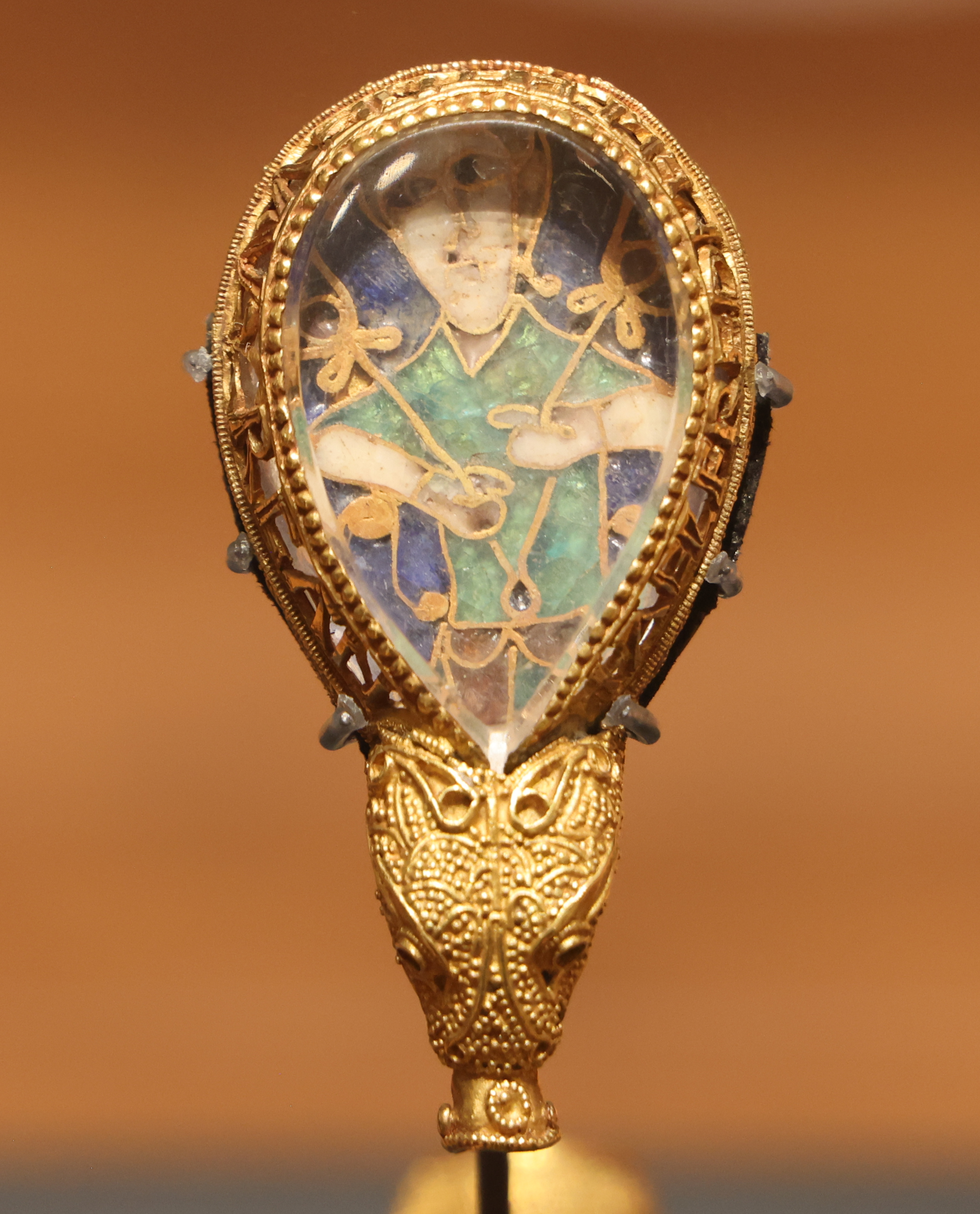
The Jewel viewed from the front, with the top in shadow

The Alfred Jewel is a piece of Anglo-Saxon goldsmithing work made of enamel and quartz enclosed in gold. It was discovered in 1693, in North Petherton, Somerset, England and is now one of the most popular exhibits at the Ashmolean Museum in Oxford. It has been dated to the late 9th century, in the reign of Alfred the Great, and is inscribed "AELFRED MEC HEHT GEWYRCAN", meaning "Alfred ordered me made". The jewel was once attached to a rod, probably of wood, at its base. After decades of scholarly discussion, it is now "generally accepted" that the jewel's function was to be the handle for a pointer stick for following words when reading a book. It is an exceptional and unusual example of Anglo-Saxon jewellery.

== Function and commission ==
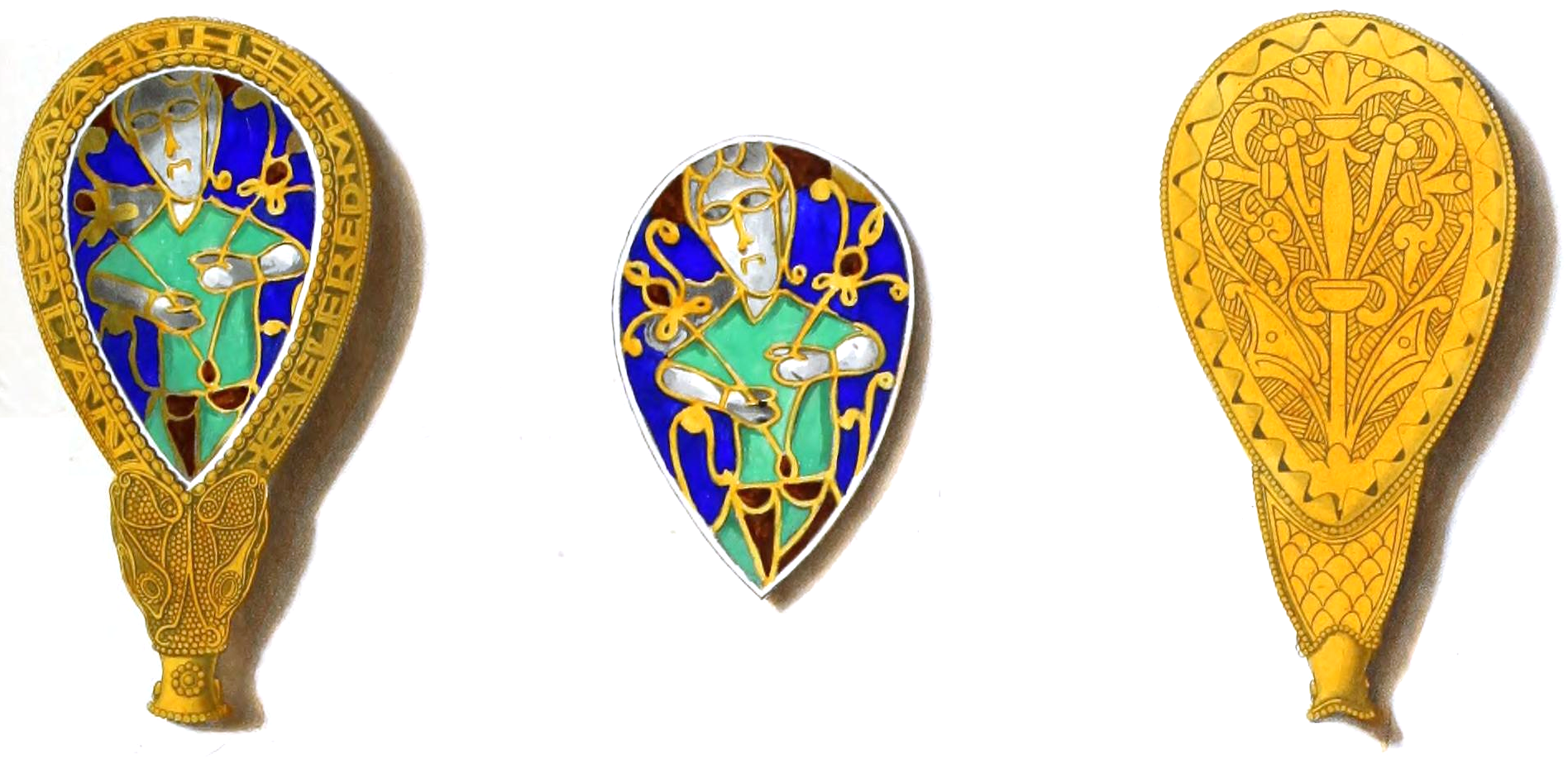
Front view; frame removed; back view

Although the function of the Jewel is not absolutely certain, it is believed to have been the handle or terminal for one of the precious "aestels" or staffs that Alfred the Great is recorded as having sent to each bishopric along with a copy of his translation of Pope Gregory the Great's book Pastoral Care. He wrote in his preface to the book:

And I will send a copy to every bishop's see in my kingdom, and in each book there is an aestel of 50 mancusses and I command, in God's name, that no man take the staff from the book, nor the book from the church.

"Mancus" was a term used in early medieval Europe to denote either a gold coin, with a weight of gold of 4.25 grams (2.73 dwt; equivalent to the Islamic dinar, and thus lighter than the Byzantine solidus), or a unit of account of thirty silver pence. This made it worth about a month's wages for a skilled worker, such as a craftsman or a soldier.

No other context is given in the preface, but in the context of books, the Old English word "aestel" can mean a "guide", "index", and also a "handle"; so, it is concluded that it meant a small pointer. Other jewelled objects with a similar form have survived, all with empty sockets, such as a 9th-century example in gold and glass in the British Museum, found in Bowleaze Cove in Dorset (see below), and the yad or "Torah pointer" remains in use in Jewish practice. David M. Wilson sounded a note of caution as to the connection with Alfred, noting that "in a period when royal titles meant something, there is no royal title in the inscription". However the commissioning by Alfred and the function as a pointer handle are taken as firmly established by Leslie Webster in her survey Anglo-Saxon Art of 2012, as well as by the Ashmolean. Other functions suggested have been as an ornament for a crown, or as a pendant, though this would display the figure upside down.

== Description ==
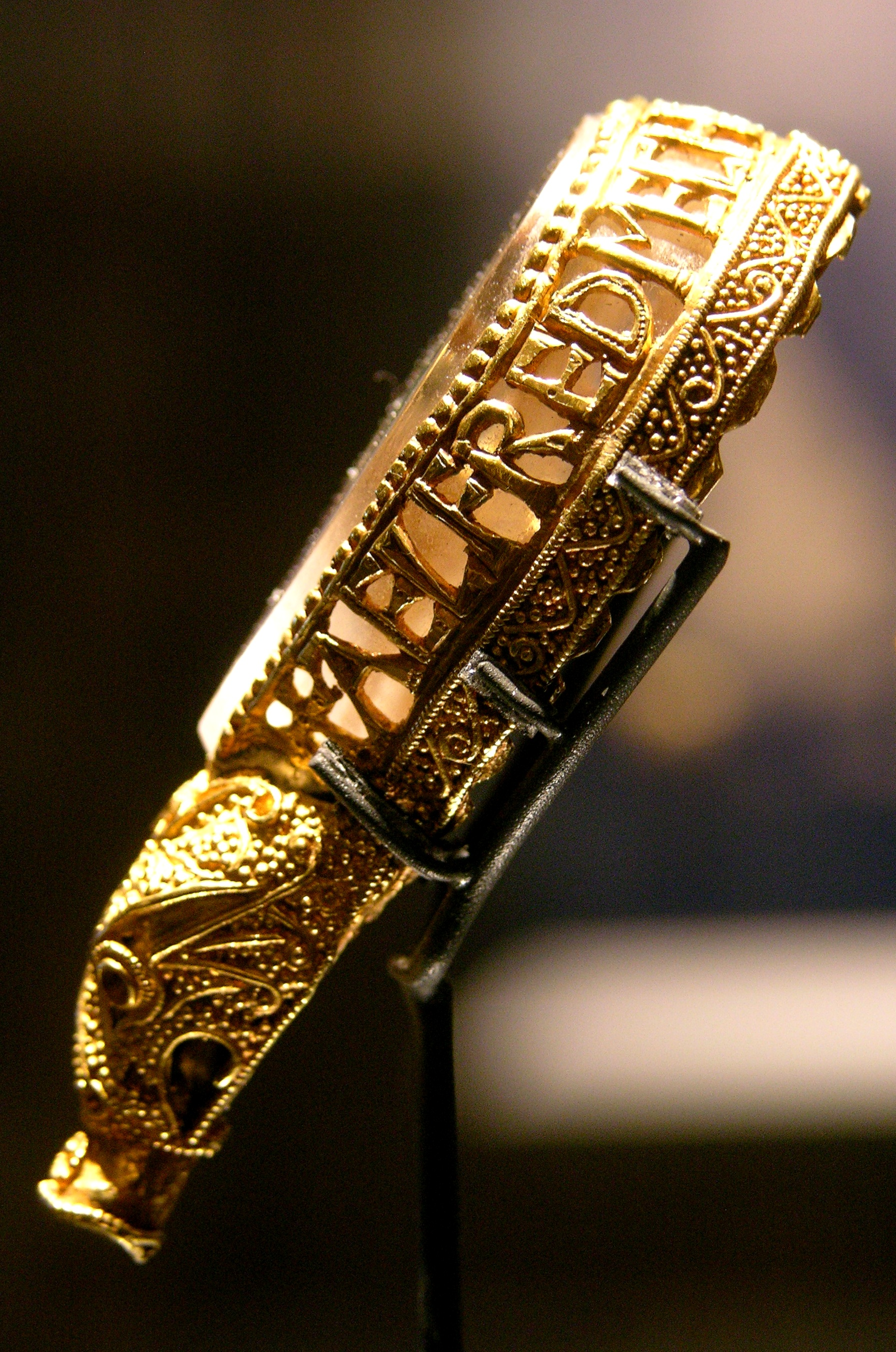
Side-on view of the Jewel

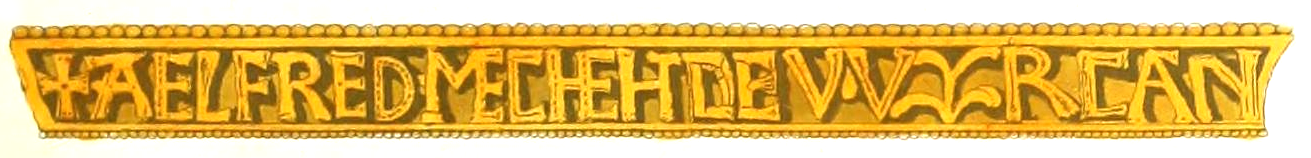
The inscription round the sides

The Alfred Jewel is about 2 1/2 inches (6.4 cm) long and is made of filigreed gold, enclosing a highly polished tear-shaped piece of clear quartz "rock crystal", beneath which is set a cloisonné enamel plaque, with an image of a man, perhaps Christ, with ecclesiastical symbols. The figure "closely resembles the figure of Sight in the Fuller Brooch, but it is most commonly thought to represent Christ as Wisdom or Christ in Majesty", according to Wilson, although Webster considers a personification of "Sight" a likely identification, also comparing it to the Fuller Brooch. Around the sides of the crystal there is a rim at the top that holds the rock crystal in place, above an openwork inscription: "AELFRED MEC HEHT GEWYRCAN" (Ælfred mec heht ġewyrċan, [ˈælv.red mek hext jeˈwyrˠ.t͡ʃɑn]), meaning "Alfred ordered me made".

An animal head at the base has as its snout a hollow socket, like those found in the other examples, showing that it was intended to hold a thin rod or stick. The back is a flat gold plate engraved with an acanthus-like plant motif, or Tree of Life according to Webster. Like the back of other examples, it is "suitable for sliding smoothly across the surface of a page". The use of relatively large cells of enamel to create a figurative image is an innovation in Anglo-Saxon art, following Byzantine or Carolingian examples, as is the use of rock crystal as a "see-through" cover. The rock crystal piece may be recycled from a Roman object.

== Later history ==
The jewel was ploughed up in 1693 at Petherton Park, North Petherton in the English county of Somerset, on land owned by Sir Thomas Wroth (c. 1675–1721). North Petherton is about 8 miles (13 km) away from Athelney, where King Alfred founded a monastery. A description of the Alfred Jewel was first published in 1698, in the Philosophical Transactions of the Royal Society. It was bequeathed to Oxford University by Colonel Nathaniel Palmer (c. 1661–1718), and today is in the Ashmolean Museum in Oxford. There is a replica of the jewel in the Church of St Mary, North Petherton and also one in the archives at Tamworth Castle. Another replica is on display in the Blake Museum, Bridgwater. In February 2015 the jewel returned to Somerset for the first time in 297 years when it was displayed for a month in the Museum of Somerset, Taunton Castle. In 2018–2019, it was displayed in the British Library, London as part of the "Anglo-Saxon Kingdoms: Art, Word, War" exhibition.

== Similar jewels ==
Since the discovery of the Alfred Jewel, a number of similar objects have been found. All are smaller and less elaborate, but are traceable to the same period and have a socket like that on the Alfred Jewel, suggesting that they were made for the same purpose. Simon Keynes comments that "it is perhaps only a matter of time before another is found in a context that reveals its function".

- The Minster Lovell Jewel – the most similar to the Alfred Jewel, consisting of a round gold disk that contains an enamel plaque of a floral design. It was found in Minster Lovell in Oxfordshire and is held at the Ashmolean Museum.
- The Warminster Jewel – consists of filigreed gold strips containing a white rock crystal. A small blue glass stone is held in the middle of the jewel where the gold strips meet. This jewel was discovered in Warminster in Wiltshire and is held in The Salisbury Museum.
- The Bowleaze Jewel – made of gold, decorated with beaded wire, granulation, and with a blue glass stone in the middle. It was found at Bowleaze Cove near Weymouth, Dorset and is now in the British Museum.
- The Yorkshire Aestel – resembles a golden animal's head with blue glass eyes, one of which is missing. It was found in Aughton, Yorkshire, by Tim Pearson and was sold as "lot 312" in Bonhams' Antiquities auction on 15 October 2008 for £10,800. This is the only privately owned aestel.
- The Borg Aestel – decorated with a pattern of spirals of gold wire. It was found in the ruins of a Viking Age Chieftain Hall at Borg in the Lofoten Islands in Norway, and is now in the Lofotr Viking Museum. Alfred is known to have been visited by a powerful trader called Ottar, who was native to the Lofoten Islands, so it is possible that Alfred gave him the jewel as a gift. Alternatively, and perhaps more likely, it was Viking loot, like most Anglo-Saxon finds in Scandinavia.
- The Bidford Bobble – the smallest of the jewels. Its round head is made of patterned gold with blue and red enamel pieces. It was found in Bidford-on-Avon in Warwickshire in 1999 and now belongs to the Warwickshire Museum Service.

The above six objects, along with the Alfred Jewel, were exhibited together in Winchester Discovery Centre in 2008, as the centrepiece of an exhibition of relics of Alfred the Great.

- A gilded copper-alloy example, incorporating a pierced Celtic type cross, was found in excavations at Berkeley Castle, Gloucestershire in 2008.
- A gold domed object with a blue glass stone in the middle, probably an aestel, was discovered at Drinkstone, Suffolk in 2014. It is now in the Moyse's Hall Museum in Bury St Edmunds.
- A gilt copper-alloy finial in the shape of a cross was found in Whissonsett, Norfolk, also in 2014. However, its function as an aestel is more debatable.
- A fragmentary gilded copper-alloy socketed object was found in Send, Surrey, in 2016. Again, its function as an aestel is debatable.

== Alexander the Great theory ==
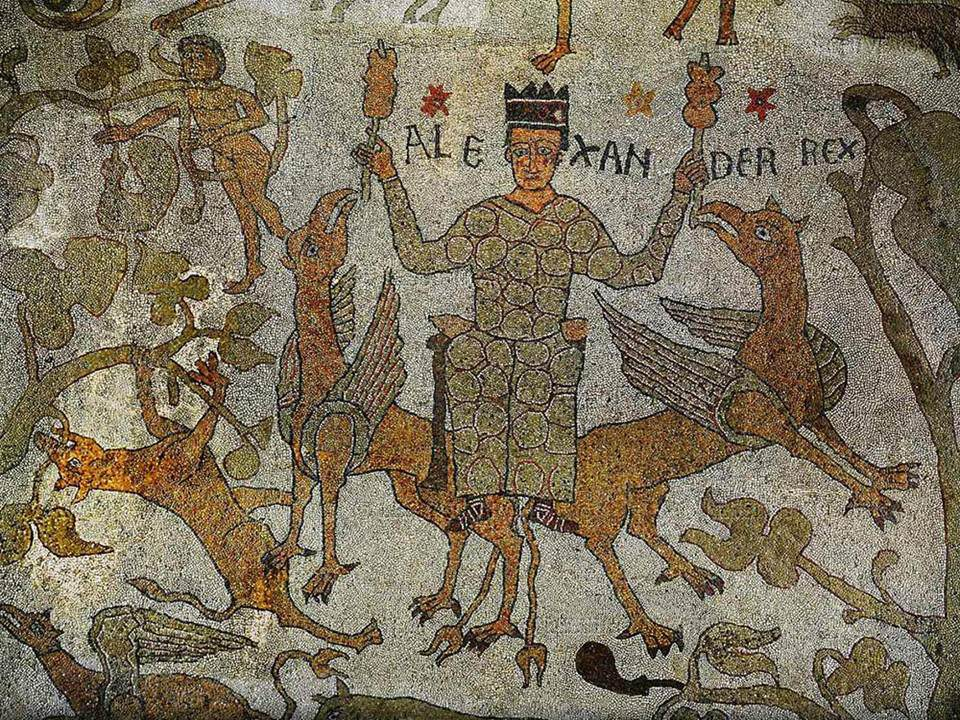
Alexander the Great carried aloft by griffins, Otranto Cathedral floor mosaic

In a paper published in 2014, Sir John Boardman endorsed the earlier suggestion by David Talbot Rice that the figure on the jewel was intended to represent Alexander the Great. A medieval legend in the Alexander Romance had Alexander, wishing to see the whole world, first descending into the depths of the ocean in a sort of diving bell, then wanting to see the view from above. To do this he harnessed two large birds, or griffins in other versions, with a seat for him between them. To entice them to keep flying higher he placed meat on two skewers which he held above their heads. This was quite commonly depicted in several medieval cultures, from Europe to Persia, where it may reflect earlier legends or iconographies. Sometimes the beasts are not shown, just the king holding two sticks with flower-like blobs at their ends.

The scene is shown in the famous 12th-century floor mosaic in Otranto Cathedral in southern Italy, with a titulus of "ALEXANDER REX". The scene refers to knowledge coming through sight, and so would be appropriate for an aestel. Boardman detects the same meaning in the figure representing sight on the Anglo-Saxon Fuller Brooch.

== Cultural references ==
The Early English Text Society, a text publication society founded in 1864 to publish Anglo-Saxon and medieval English texts, uses a representation of the enamel plaque of the Jewel (omitting the gold frame) as its emblem.

The Society for Medieval Archaeology, established in 1957, uses a representation of the Jewel as a logo. It was drawn by Eva Sjoegren (wife of David M. Wilson, one of the founders), appeared prominently on the front cover of Medieval Archaeology, the society's journal, from 1957 to 2010, and continues to appear on the title page.

In the epic poem The Ballad of the White Horse by G. K. Chesterton (1911), King Alfred offers the Jewel to the Virgin Mary on the island of Athelney.

One dim ancestral jewel hung
On his ruined armour grey,
He rent and cast it at her feet:
Where, after centuries, with slow feet,
Men came from hall and school and street
And found it where it lay.

— Book I, lines 178–183

A replica of the Jewel is given as a birthday present in chapter six of Nancy Mitford's comic novel, The Pursuit of Love (1945).

In Susan Cooper's The Dark is Rising (1973), one of the six Signs of the Light, the Sign of Fire, is based on the Jewel. It also is made with gold and bears the inscription "LIHT MEC HEHT GEWYRCAN", or "The Light ordered me made".

The Jewel is referred to in Roy Harper's 19-minute song "One of Those Days in England (Parts 2–10)" from the album Bullinamingvase (1977).

The Inspector Morse episode "The Wolvercote Tongue" (1987) centres on the theft of a fictional Saxon artefact based on the Jewel.

A near identical aestel (with the Christ-like figure wearing a red tunic instead of a green one) appeared in BBC Four's Detectorists in 2015, first appearing in series two, and playing a more pivotal role in the following Christmas Special.

In an episode of the historical fiction series The Last Kingdom, Alfred sends out his nephew Aethelwold as his envoy and hands him the Jewel to use as a sign of Alfred's royal authority.
