= Sahara Sunday Spain =

American poet

Sahara Sunday Spain (born November 12, 1991) is an entrepreneur and former child author. She is the CEO of the Gentle Earth Project.

When she was 9 years-old she became America’s then youngest published author with a book of poetry, If There Would Be No Light: Poems From My Heart, in 2001.

SanFrancisco Harper Collins picked up the manuscript and paid the young author a five-figure advance for the book, which had an initial print run of 15,000. The book is a collection of poems written by Spain in her early childhood.

== Early life, family and education ==
Sahara Sunday Spain was born in San Francisco, California, to Elisabeth Sunday, a contemporary artist-photographer and, Johnny Spain, a former Black Panther civil rights activist and convicted murderer. The couple divorced in 1993.

As a child, Spain spent the majority of her time traveling with her mother across Africa, Asia, and Australia, and had lived in more than 20 countries by the time she was in high school.

Spain herself attended The Nueva School, which is a private educational institution for gifted individuals, in Hillsborough. Spain also attended Idyllwild Arts Academy for high school and later got her degrees at Colgate University.

With Sir Benjamin Slade, 7th Baronet, Sunday Spain has a daughter, born through in vitro fertilisation.

== Career ==
Her first poem, “Mother’s Milk” was written when she was five years old. It is included in her only published book and speaks about the relationship between mother and child. The collection of poems and drawings was recorded by her mother and then given to friends and family as gifts. SanFrancisco Harper Collins picked up the manuscript and paid the young author a five-figure advance for the book, which had an initial print run of 15,000. At 9 years old she was America's then-youngest published author to have a monograph. The book contains 61 poems illustrated with her drawings made between the ages of 5 and 8 years old and drew significant international press including The Early Show with Bryant Gumbel, The PBS affiliate KQED's Spark, To Tell the Truth, and the French station TF1, Drôle de petits champions. She was also featured in The New York Times Magazine, The Guardian, the San Francisco Chronicle, The Oakland Tribune, Time for Kids and the May 28, 2001 issue of the French magazine OH LA!

In 2021 Spain began what would eventually become the Gentle Earth Project in 2024, whose mission is dedicated to revitalizing distressed ecosystems and marginalized communities, restoring balance through innovative monetization models. The GEP's projects harnesses circular economic principles, aiming not only to heal ecological wounds but also to foster holistic ecosystems where people and environments flourish across generations.

== Charity work ==
In 2001 Spain founded the non-profit organization The Kah-Monno Group, a school for girls in Mali that worked to close the gender gap in rural Malian education, and eradicated forced child marriage and FGM in the area. The school was operational for 15 years until the civil war that broke out in 2014 forced its closure.

== Books ==
- If There Would Be No Light: Poems From My Heart. HarperOne, 2001. ISBN 978-0062517401
