= Nigel Cayzer =

British businessman (1954–2026)

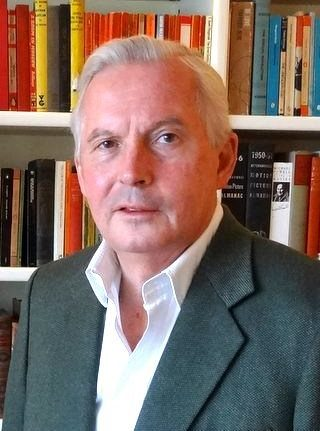
- Nigel Cayzer in 2014
- Born: 30 April 1954
- Died: 21 March 2026 (aged 71)
- Occupation: Businessman
- Spouse: Henrietta Sykes (m. 1986)
- Children: 4

Nigel Cayzer (30 April 1954 – 21 March 2026) was a British businessman and chairman of two London-listed funds: Aberdeen Asian Smaller Companies Investment Trust and Oryx International Growth Fund. He served as chairman of the cancer care charity Maggie's from 2005 to 2014.

== Early life and education ==
Nigel Cayzer was born on 30 April 1954. He was named as heir to the estates of his uncle, Sir James Cayzer, Bt, and changed his surname to Nigel Cayzer by deed poll in 1982. He was educated at Eton College.

== Career ==
Cayzer began his career working in the stock exchange for L Messel & Co. In 1986, he became a non-executive director of Caledonia Investments, a UK-listed investment trust company. In 1989, he became chairman of Allied Insurance Brokers (AIB). In 1991, the holding company's name was changed from Allied Insurance Brokers to Oriel. Oriel subsequently became the UK's leading motor warranty company.

In 1993, he oversaw the acquisition by the Oman National Insurance Company (ONIC) of an 18.7% stake in Oriel. The following year, he established and became chairman of the Oryx JIA, an open-ended fund quoted on the Muscat Securities Market and invested principally in equities in Oman and other countries in the GCC. He held this position until 2007. He was a non-executive director of the Alliance Housing Bank SAOG between 1998 and 2006, and was the chairman of the Oryx International Growth Fund.

In 1995, he became chairman of the newly formed Aberdeen Asian Smaller Companies Investment Trust PLC (AAS), a position he retained.

He served as chairman of the cancer care charity Maggie's between 2005 and 2014.

== Personal life and death ==
Nigel Cayzer married Henrietta Sykes, daughter of Sir Richard Sykes, Bt, in 1986. The couple had four children.

Cayzer died on 21 March 2026, at the age of 71.
