= Claude Myburgh =

English cricketer and British Army officer (1911–1987)

Personal information
- Full name: Claude John Myburgh
- Born: 4 July 1911; Cheltenham, Gloucestershire, England
- Died: 10 October 1987 (aged 76); Hartley Wintney, Hampshire, England
- Batting: Right-handed
- Bowling: Right-arm fast-medium

Domestic team information
- Years: Team
- 1933–1934: Devon

Career statistics
Competition	First-class
Matches	1
Runs scored	13
Batting average	–
100s/50s	0/0
Top score	13*
Balls bowled	183
Wickets	1
Bowling average	70.00
5 wickets in innings	0
10 wickets in match	0
Best bowling	1/12
Catches/stumpings	1/–
- Source: Cricinfo, 1 March 2011

Major Claude John Myburgh (4 July 1911 – 10 October 1987) was an English cricketer and British Army officer. Myburgh was a right-handed batsman who bowled right-arm fast-medium. He was born in Cheltenham, Gloucestershire and was educated at St Lawrence College, Ramsgate where he played for the college cricket team.

Myburgh made his debut for Devon in the 1933 Minor Counties Championship against Cornwall. From 1933 to 1934, he represented Devon in five further matches, playing his final Championship match against Cornwall. In August 1933, he played his only first-class match for the Army against the touring West Indians. In this match he scored an unbeaten 13 runs in the Army first-innings. With the ball he took a single wicket, that of West Indian captain Jackie Grant.

By 1932, Myburgh had graduated from the Royal Military College with the rank of 2nd Lieutenant and was serving in the Worcestershire Regiment. He eventually reached the rank of Major. He had two daughters, Sarah Georgina Myburgh and Pauline Carol Myburgh, who married Sir Benjamin Slade. Their marriage ended in 1991. Myburgh died at Inholmes Court in Hartley Wintney, Hampshire on 10 October 1987.
