= John the Old Saxon =

Scholar and abbot of Athelney

Iohannes (John the Old Saxon)
- Abbot of Athelney
- See: Athelney Abbey
- Appointed: unknown
- Term ended: c. 904

Orders
- Consecration: c. 892

Personal details
- Born: unknown unknown – apparently in Old Saxony
- Died: c. 904 unknown – might be Malmesbury

John the Old Saxon (active c. 885–904), also known as John of Saxony or Scotus, was a scholar and abbot of Athelney, probably born in Old Saxony. He was invited to England by King Alfred and contributed to Alfred's revival of English learning. In his Life of Alfred, the Welsh monk Asser reports that John "was a man of most acute intelligence, immensely learned in all fields of literary endeavour, and extremely ingenious in many other forms of expression".

== Name and early life ==
John is often referred as Iohannes. Asser states that he was of "Old" Saxon (as opposed to Anglo-Saxon or English) origins, in other words from east of the Rhine. Nothing more precise is known; as a monk, he might have been raised in one of the Saxon monasteries such as Korvey or Gandersheim, but he could also have come to England from western Francia, like Grimbald, who came to England from Reims at approximately the same time as John, in the mid-880s. Asser comments at one point that John had some experience with fighting, which implies that he had a secular upbringing.

== Consecration as abbot of Athelney ==
King Alfred acknowledges the help among others of "John my mass-priest" with one of his first translations from Latin to Anglo-Saxon, of Gregory's Regula Pastoralis. John witnessed one of Alfred's charters (a grant to Ealdorman Æthelhelm, dated 892), and presumably played a role in formulating his ecclesiastical policy. When Alfred founded the monastery of Athelney, John was appointed abbot, but as Asser relates, the monks included some of "Gallic", or West Frankish, origin. Two of these paid Frankish assassins to hide in the church and attack John when he came in to pray privately. John was seriously wounded, but his cries brought friends who saved him. He survived to witness several charters of King Edward the Elder, the latest of which are dated 904. That he witnessed as "priest" rather than as "abbot" may imply that he had by then relinquished his abbacy; however, none of the charters is witnessed by anyone described as an abbot.

== Death and grave ==
The date of John's death is unknown. William of Malmesbury records the epitaph of a Iohannes Sophista (John the scholar) who was buried at Malmesbury. John the Old Saxon is not known to have had any connection with Malmesbury, but this cannot have been John Scotus Eriugena, who had died in Francia probably between c. 870 and 877, and the name "John" is rare in Anglo-Saxon England, so it is difficult to think who else this might be.

== Attributed works ==
A small group of Latin acrostic poems are very likely by John the Old Saxon. The first is an eight-line hexameter poem, probably copied in English script during the 930s into a manuscript of continental (north Frankish) origin which later moved to England, and has "ADALSTAN" as its acrostich and "IOHANNES" as its telestich. The date, in combination with the spelling Adalstan (an apparent representation of the Old English name Æþelstan by a speaker of a Continental Low German dialect such as Old Saxon), suggests that "Iohannes" is a signature by John the Old Saxon. The poem describes Adalstan as a prince and is presumably an encomium to King Alfred's young grandson Æthelstan, who was then five at the oldest but was king from 924 to 939. The poem is embellished with Greek words and archaisms, foreshadowing the complex style which dominated in 10th-century Anglo-Latin literature. Acrostics are rare at this early period, so two further examples which are dedicated to King Alfred and preserved as early 10th-century additions to a late-9th-century manuscript associated with the king are possibly also by John the Old Saxon.
