= Castaways' Club =

English dining club for retired naval officers

The Castaways' Club
- Silver figure depicting a Castaway (Castaways' Club coll.)
- Founded: 1895

The Castaways' Club is a dining club for retired warfare officers (previously known as executive or seaman officers) of the Royal Navy who left the service while still junior officers, typically with the rank of lieutenant or lieutenant commander. The club has no permanent rooms but meets once a year for dinner to which members invite guests who must be serving or retired warfare officers.

== History ==
The Castaways' Club was founded in 1895 "for the purpose of promoting social intercourse between gentlemen who had resigned their commissions as Executive Officers of Her Majesty’s Navy and who were desirous of keeping in touch with their former Service". The Club has a considerable collection of mess silver which has been donated by guests and members since the Club was founded. This includes a silver cup presented to the club in 1908 by George V who was a frequent guest when Prince of Wales.

Today, the Castaways' Club annual dinner remains very popular in naval circles and the Club has maintained its original purpose. Membership elections are held once a year. Membership is limited to 120 and there is a considerable and undisclosed waiting list.

== Notable members and former members ==
- Admiral of the Fleet His Majesty King Charles III, KG KT
- Admiral of the Fleet Prince Philip, Duke of Edinburgh, KG KT
- Colonel Sir John Crompton-Inglefield TD DL (late Sub Lieutenant RN)
- Commander The Earl Beatty DSC, 2nd Earl Beatty
- Commander Lord Sandford DSC
- Commander Sir Arthur Trevor Dawson Bt.
- Commander Lord Rennell of Rodd, 3rd Baron Rennell
- Lieutenant Colonel Sir Martin Archer-Shee KCMG DSO (late Sub Lieutenant RN)
- Lieutenant Commander The Earl of Abingdon, 8th Earl of Abingdon, 13th Earl of Lindsey
- Lieutenant Commander The Lord Glenconner, 2nd Baron Glenconner
- Lieutenant Commander The Viscount Bridport, Duke of Bronte, 3rd Viscount Bridport
- Lieutenant Commander The Lord Congleton, 6th Baron Congleton
- Lieutenant Commander Sir August Cayzer Bt.
- Lieutenant Commander Sir Keith Speed RD
- Lieutenant Prince Alexander Albert of Battenberg, Marquess of Carisbrooke GCB GCVO
- Lieutenant David Mountbatten OBE DSC, 3rd Marquess of Milford Haven
- Lieutenant The Duke of Hamilton, 13th Duke of Hamilton, 10th Duke of Brandon
- Lieutenant The Duke of Buccleuch, KT GCVO, 7th Duke of Buccleuch
- Lieutenant The Earl of Westmorland, 14th Earl of Westmorland
- Lieutenant Lord Ironside, 2nd Baron Ironside
- Lieutenant The Lord Janvrin GCB GCVO PC
- Lieutenant The Viscount Monsell GBE, 1st Viscount Monsell
- Lieutenant Sir William Benyon DL
- Lieutenant Sir Timothy Colman KG
- Lieutenant Christopher Lewis
