= Chrystabel Leighton-Porter =

English model (1913–2000)

- Born: Chrystabel Jane Drewry; 11 April 1913; Eastleigh, Hampshire, England
- Died: 6 December 2000 (aged 87); Horsham, West Sussex, England
- Occupations: Model; actress
- Known for: Model for the wartime cartoon heroine "Jane"

Chrystabel Jane Leighton-Porter (née Drewry; 11 April 1913 – 6 December 2000) was the model for the Second World War Daily Mirror newspaper cartoon heroine Jane which boosted morale during the Blitz. Prime Minister of the United Kingdom Winston Churchill suggested that Jane was "Britain's secret weapon".

== Early life ==
Born Chrystabel Jane Drewry in Eastleigh, Hampshire in April 1913, she had an older twin, Sylvia, and was the youngest of eleven children of whom three died young. Her modelling started after she left school when she moved to London to live with her sister and earned a living posing for life classes. In 1934, she married pilot Arthur Leighton-Porter. Later during her time as 'Jane' the fact she was married became a carefully guarded secret as Leighton-Porter believed her fans thought of her as their girlfriend, and that she must always remain single in their eyes.

== Jane ==
The Daily Mirror cartoonist Norman Pett had been drawing a weekly cartoon since 1932 which he called Jane's Journal – The Diary of A Bright Young Thing. Pett's original model was his wife, but he replaced her with Chrystabel in 1940. In 1944, when Jane first appeared nude in the cartoon, she was credited with 'inspiring' the 36th Division to advance six miles into Burma.

In 1948, Pett's assistant Michael Hubbard took over the Jane cartoons. Chrystabel Leighton-Porter began a music hall striptease-act based on the Jane character which toured army bases around the country. She won the title of "Britain's Perfect Girl" at the London Palladium and was signed up by theatrical agent Lew Grade which led to her starring in the film The Adventures of Jane in 1949. It was released on DVD in April 2008.

"Jane" received many letters from servicemen proposing marriage (62 in just one week) and Chrystabel was careful to hide the fact that she had already secretly married Arthur Leighton-Porter, a Royal Air Force pilot, before the outbreak of the war. Hubbard continued to develop the cartoons' storyline until 1959, when he gave Jane a happy marriage and ended the series.

== Later life ==
In 1952 Leighton-Porter gave birth to a stillborn baby boy, and then in 1955 suffered another loss of a baby girl named Jane who lived for just fourteen hours. In 1957 the couple had a son Simon, who grew up to be a writer.

In the fifties, she worked for theatre impresario Paul Raymond in such shows as the Festival of Strip-tease (1958).

In the early-1960s Leighton-Porter moved to Bermuda and then to Horsham, Sussex where she centred her activities around her son Simon (who later followed his father into the RAF) and was a fundraiser for several charities. She was also active in her local Conservative Party association. In the 1980s a BBC television adaptation was made of "Jane", starring Glynis Barber.

In her later years, Leighton-Porter made regular appearances at wartime reunions. In 1993, the Imperial War Museum exhibition Forces Sweethearts included her 1940s frilly knickers. She died on 6 December 2000 aged 87. Arthur died in January 2002.
