= Charles Cayzer (businessman, born 1957) =

British billionaire businessman

- Born: Hon. Charles William Cayzer; 26 April 1957 (age 69)
- Occupation: Businessman
- Spouse: Amanda C. S. Squire (div.)
- Children: 2
- Relatives: Robin Cayzer, 3rd Baron Rotherwick (brother)

Charles William Cayzer (born 26 April 1957), is a British businessman.

== Early life ==
He was born 26 April 1957, the son of Herbert Robin Cayzer, 2nd Baron Rotherwick, and his wife Sarah Jane Slade, the daughter of Sir Michael Nial Slade, 6th Baronet.

He is the younger brother of Robin Cayzer, 3rd Baron Rotherwick.

== Career ==
Cayzer worked in merchant banking, commercial banking and corporate and project finance at Baring Brothers, Cayzer Irvine & Co and Cayzer Limited.

He was an executive director of Caledonia Investments from 1985, and a non-executive director since 2012.

Cayzer is chairman of the Sloane Club, Easybox and Edinmore.

According to the Sunday Times Rich List in 2021, Cayzer's net worth was estimated at £959 million, a decrease of £140 million from the previous year.

== Personal life ==
In 1985, he married Amanda C. S. Squire, the second daughter of John Squire, of Marbella, Spain, and they have children.

In 2008, his ex-wife married Nicholas Alexander, 7th Earl of Caledon at Chelsea Register Office, and is now known as the Countess of Caledon. They live on the 5,000 acre estate at Caledon Castle in Northern Ireland.
