= Elisabeth Sunday =

American photographer (born 1958)

Elisabeth Sunday (born 1958) is an American photographer known for her black and white portraits of people in Africa and Asia. Her subjects have included Akan fishermen in Ghana, Koro men in the Omo Valley of Ethiopia, and nomadic women in Algeria, Mauritania, Mali and Niger, as well as people in Kenya and Zaire.

In 1999-2000, the Berkeley Art Museum organized a solo exhibition of her work called Mystics and Healers: Holy People and Their Messages. In 2017, her works from the Anima and Tuareg series were exhibited at the Museum of the African Diaspora in San Francisco. Her work has been included in many group exhibitions, including ''Constructed Images: New Photography,'' (1989) curated by Deborah Willis for the Studio Museum in Harlem.

Her work is many museums collections, including: Berkeley Art Museum; Iris & B. Gerald Cantor Center for Visual Arts at Stanford University; Los Angeles County Museum of Art; Museum of Fine Arts, Houston; Le Bibliothèque Nationale de Paris; The Schomburg Center for Research in Black Culture, New York; Oakland Museum of California; Cleveland Museum of Art; Chrysler Museum of Art, Norfolk, VA; and the California African American Museum.

Her work has also been collected by many prominent figures, including Alice Walker, Gloria Steinem, Bonnie Raitt, Bill Cosby and Quincy Jones.

Her daughter (with former Black Panther Johnny Spain, one of the San Quentin Six) is poet Sahara Sunday Spain.
