= Nicholas Cayzer, Baron Cayzer =

William Nicholas Cayzer, Baron Cayzer (21 January 1910 – 16 April 1999), known as Sir Nicholas Cayzer, 2nd Baronet from 1943 to 1982, was a British ship-owner responsible for amalgamating the Clan Line, Union-Castle Line, King Line and Bullard King & Company to form the British & Commonwealth Shipping Co. Ltd.

Educated at Eton College and Christ's College, Cambridge, he was the elder son of Sir August Cayzer, 1st Baronet, whom he followed into the shipping business and succeeded in the baronetcy.

In 1944 he became chairman of the Liverpool Steamship Owners Association.

In the 1982 New Year Honours list he was given a life peerage in recognition of his contribution to shipping and politics, and was created Baron Cayzer, of St Mary Axe in the City of London on 8 February.

He married Elizabeth Williams of Aberpergwm House and they had two daughters, one of whom married the son of Michael Colvin, giving him two grand-daughters and a grandson.

== Coat of arms ==
Coat of arms of Nicholas Cayzer, Baron Cayzer

Crest
A sea lion erect Proper gorged with a naval crown holding in his dexter paw a fleur-de-lys or.
Escutcheon
Per chevron Azure and Argent two estoiles Or and an ancient ship with three masts sails furled Sable colours flying Gules on a chief of the third three fleurs-de-lys of the first.
Supporters
Two golden-retriever bitches sejant Proper each having a collar Azure buckled edged and garnished Or and in the shoulder from between the forelegs a lilly reflexed behind the head also Proper.
Motto
Caute Sed Impavide

Baronetage of the United Kingdom
Preceded by August Cayzer	Baronet (of Roffey Park); 1943–1999	Extinct
