= Kirsten Hughes (actress) =

British actress (1962–2022)

Kirsten Elizabeth Keswick 'Kirsty' Hughes (11 November 1962 – 27 May 2022) was a British actress best known for playing cartoon strip heroine Jane in the 1987 film Jane and the Lost City.

Hughes was the daughter of a BP businessman and was raised in Fleet in Hampshire before training at the Royal Academy of Dramatic Art (RADA), graduating with a diploma in 1983. She first came to notice when she appeared as a flight attendant in an ad for British Airways in 1986. She played Elizabeth Robertson in an episode of the schools' series Starting Out alongside Joanna Lumley and Rebecca Lacey (1986). In 1987 she played cartoon strip heroine Jane in the film Jane and the Lost City. Hughes played Mary McKinnon in The Kitchen Toto (1987), Anna in At the Cafe Continental (1989), Trudy/Kate Hindley in Boon (1987–1991), Allison Mannering in the Channel 5 children's television series The Enid Blyton Adventures (1997), and Cynthia Barton in Reversals (2003).

From 1995 to 2011 she was the partner of Sir Benjamin Slade, and worked with him in making Maunsel House and neighbouring Woodlands Castle into a successful wedding venue. After a three-year affair, she later "ran off with the handyman".
