= Jane (British TV series) =

British TV sitcom (1982, 1984)

Jane is an early 1980s British animated and live-action military comedy television series. It was produced for two series, in 1982 and 1984. Set during World War II, it was based on the Jane comic strip created by Norman Pett and first published in the Daily Mail in 1932. The series was produced in 10-minute episodes. The cast included Glynis Barber (as Jane), Bob Danvers-Walker, Max Wall, Dean Allen, Robin Bailey, Suzanne Danielle, John Bird, Frank Thornton and Clive Mantle. Graham McCallum won BAFTA Awards for Best Graphics in 1983 and 1985 for his work on the two series.
