= Jane and the Lost City =

- Theatrical release poster
- Directed by: Terry Marcel
- Written by: Mervyn Haisman
- Produced by: Harry Robertson
- Starring: Sam Jones; Maud Adams; Jasper Carrott; Robin Bailey; Graham Stark; Kirsten Hughes
- Cinematography: Paul Beeson
- Music by: Harry Robertson
- Distributed by: Blue Dolphin Film Distribution (UK); New World Pictures (US)
- Release date: 18 September 1987 (US)
- Running time: 94 min
- Country: United Kingdom
- Language: English

Jane and the Lost City is a 1987 British comedy-drama film directed by Terry Marcel and starring Kirsten Hughes, Sam Jones, Maud Adams, Jasper Carrott and Robin Bailey. It was written by Mervyn Haisman based on the British Daily Mirror newspaper strip Jane by Norman Pett.

== Synopsis ==
British Prime Minister Winston Churchill sends Jane and the Colonel on a mission to prevent the diamonds of the fabled Lost City from falling into enemy hands. Journeying to Africa where they are joined by Jungle Jack Buck, their quest is dogged by Nazi agents Lola Pagola and Heinrich.

== Cast ==
- Sam J. Jones as 'Jungle' Jack Buck
- Maud Adams as Lola Pagola
- Jasper Carrott as Heinrich / Herman / Hans
- Kirsten Hughes as Jane
- Graham Stark as Tombs
- Robin Bailey as The Colonel
- Ian Roberts as Carl
- Elsa O'Toole as The Leopard Queen
- John Rapley as Dr. Schell
- Charles Comyn as Paddy
- Ian Steadman as Capt. Fawcett
- Graham Armitage as General Smythe-Paget
- Richard Huggett as Winston Churchill
- Andrew Buckland as Grenville
- Albert Raphael as Rashleigh
- James White as Scott
- Victor Gallucci as Muller
- Patrick Hugnin as German pilot
- John Alton as Freddy
- Magnum as Fritz the dog
- Dharmarajen Sabapathee, Indian chief

== Production notes ==
Location filming took place in Mauritius.

== Reception ==
Time Out wrote: "This would-be romp based around the saucy exploits of the oft-déshabillée, cami-knickered heroine (Hughes) of the Daily Mirror's wartime 'Jane' strip cartoon is bad beyond the promptings of idle curiosity. ... Notwithstanding the spasmodic salacious shots of Jane's principal silk-clad joints, the film translates the innocent eroticism and tongue-in-cheek adventurism of the strip into a pile of puerile, enervative folie.

The Radio Times Guide to Films gave the film 1/5 stars, writing: "Painfully cheap comedy dredging the bottom of the Carry On barrel for its seaside postcard puns. Watching the accident-prone Jane (Kirsten Hughes) lose her clothes in awkwardly telegraphed set-ups may keep some viewers attentive, but this is a witless fiasco."

== Releases ==
The film was released on VHS in 1991 by StarMaker Entertainment and on DVD in 2001 by Anchor Bay.
