= North Petherton =

Town in Somerset, England

Coordinates: 51.091°N 3.013°W

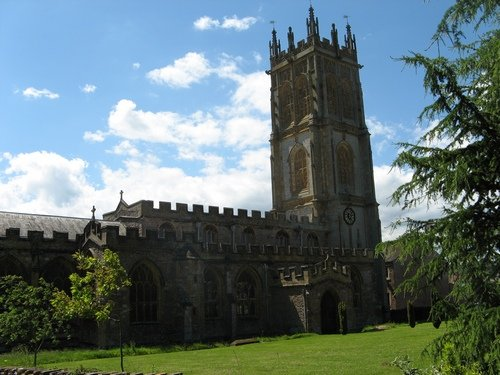
- Church of St Mary, North Petherton

- Location within Somerset
- Population: 10,050 (2021)
- OS grid reference: ST290329
- Unitary authority: Somerset Council
- Ceremonial county: Somerset
- Region: South West
- Country: England
- Sovereign state: United Kingdom
- Post town: BRIDGWATER
- Postcode district: TA6
- Dialling code: 01278
- Police: Avon and Somerset
- Fire: Devon and Somerset
- Ambulance: South Western
- UK Parliament: Bridgwater
- Website: Town Council

North Petherton is a town and civil parish in Somerset, England, lying on the edge of the eastern foothills of the Quantocks, about 2.5 miles (4 km) south of Bridgwater; in the east, the parish extends into the Somerset Levels. The parish includes the villages of North Newton and Huntworth, and the hamlets of Northmoor Green (also called Moorland), Shearston and Woolmersdon. The parish population at the 2021 census was 10,050, an increase from the 6,730 recorded in 2011.

Dating from at least the 10th century and an important settlement in Saxon times, North Petherton became a town only in the late 20th century, until then claiming to be the largest village in England. A former market and administrative centre, North Petherton is now largely a dormitory town for workers in Bridgwater and Taunton. The centre of the town is designated an area of archaeological potential, and a number of buildings have been given listed building status.

== Toponymy ==
The Domesday Book of 1086 recorded a settlement called Nortperet with 65 households. The name derives from the area's position to the north side of the River Parrett, and from the Old English nor tun.

== History ==
Long before the Norman Conquest, during Saxon times North Petherton was at the centre of a large royal estate, located on one of the historic communication routes through Somerset, and was both an important centre and the meeting place for the Hundred of North Petherton although the Petherton limit tithing of North Petherton was in the Hundred of Andersfield from the 1670s.

At the time of the Norman invasion the Hundred covered a large area corresponding, today, roughly to a north–south corridor along the M5 motorway from Junction 25 near Taunton, to north of Junction 23 at Stretcholt, and east–west from Athelney to Goathurst. The Parish of North Petherton continues to be one of the largest in Somerset to this day.

=== North Petherton Park ===
King Henry II expanded the royal estate into the royal forest (hunting ground) of Petherton Park, which continued to exist until the 17th century. Geoffrey Chaucer (~1343–1400), author of The Canterbury Tales, was appointed Deputy Forester of the royal forest of North Petherton towards the end of his life. The royal forest was probably similar in area to the Saxon Hundred of North Petherton. According to the late 13th century Hundred Rolls, King Henry II of England (died 1189) gave William of Wrotham lands at North Petherton. Between 1513 and 1535 Sir William Courtenay (d.1535) of Powderham, Devon was the keeper of North Petherton Park.

=== Other ===
The town itself it thought to have developed around the minster which, it is supposed, was on the same site as the current church. There is archaeological evidence indicating that there were timber buildings to the west of the church in the late Saxon period, and it is suspected that the remains of the Saxon settlement may continue to lie beneath the town centre. Excavations to the west of the church, on what is now the Community Centre site, revealed a 14th-century cemetery, which may have been used for victims of the plague, as well as indicating that the area was redeveloped in the late Middle Ages. It is thought that there may have been a mint in the town during the 10th or 11th century, and a charter to hold a market was granted in 1318, although it is thought that the market predated this. A shire hall, courthouse and guildhall are known to have exited and were probably located north of the church.

A minor skirmish of the English Civil War took place in August 1644 outside what was then the cornhill, now the area of Fore Street between the Community Centre and the former George Inn.

The Alfred Jewel, an object about 2.5-inch (64 mm) long, made of filigree gold, cloisonné-enamelled and with a rock crystal covering, was found in 1693 at Petherton Park, North Petherton. Believed to have been commissioned by Alfred the Great, it is thought to have been the handle for a pointer that would have fitted into the hole at its base, and been used while reading a book out loud. It is inscribed, "AELFRED MEC HEHT GEWYRCAN," ("Alfred had me made"). It may be one of the "aestels" Alfred had sent to each bishopric with a copy of his translation of Pope Gregory the Great's book Pastoral Care. A replica of the jewel can be found in the church of St Mary.

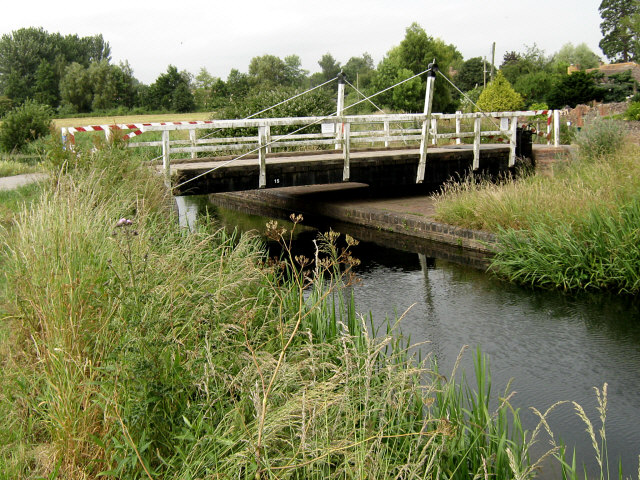
North Newton Swing Bridge

When the Bridgwater and Taunton Canal was opened in 1827 it joined the River Parrett by a lock at Huntworth, where a basin was constructed, but in 1841 the canal was extended to a floating harbour in Bridgwater, and the Huntworth link was filled in. The canal and river were not re-connected at this point when the canal was restored, because the Parrett is by then a salt water river laden with silt, whereas the canal contains fresh water. Not only is there a risk of silt entering the canal, but the salt water cannot be allowed to contaminate the fresh, as the canal is still used for the transport of drinking water for Bridgwater's population. The Crossways Swing Bridge over the canal in the parish was built in 1827 by John Rennie. It is a wooden bridge which rotated on steel ball-bearings in a circular track, a very early example of the use of ball bearings in this way. It was designated as a Grade II listed building but the mechanism was removed in 1987. The Higher and Lower Maunsel locks on the canal are either side of the Maunsel bridge which carries the A361. The stone Coxhill road bridge dates from the same time.

Woolmersdon House in Woolmersdon is a Grade II listed late Georgian residence.

In 1906, North Petherton became the first town in Britain (and perhaps the only one) to have street lights lit by piped acetylene gas, supplied by the North Petherton Gas and Carbide Company, operating from a plant in Mill Lane. The plant was demolished towards the end of the 20th century to form a car park for the local doctor's surgery. Acetylene was replaced in 1931 by coal gas produced in Bridgwater, as well as by the provision of an electricity supply, and the Gas and Carbide Company was wound up. The North Petherton Rosco Acetylene Company (dating from at least 1898) may have supplied gas to the adjacent church prior to the Gas and Carbide Company.

In 1926 the Bridgwater Beam Wireless Station was opened north east of the town. It was the receiving station for Marconi's UK-to-Canada Beam Wireless Service (part of the Imperial Wireless Chain), the first transoceanic shortwave wireless telegraph service in the world, and operated until 2002.

In 1984 North Petherton was provided with a small public library. As a result of a revitalised fund-raising campaign (originally begun decades earlier), this was followed a few years later by the construction of a Community Centre, opened in 1987, which was extended in 1991.

== Governance ==
The civil parish of North Petherton includes the villages of North Newton (on the route of the Bridgwater and Taunton Canal) and Northmoor Green (also known as Moorland) in the Somerset Levels, as well as a number of other smaller settlements. Despite several reductions in size, with land redesignated to neighbouring parishes, North Petherton remains one of the largest parishes in Somerset at 43 km^{2} (16.6 sq mi), and the largest in Sedgemoor.

The town council (which is a parish council) has responsibility for local issues, including setting an annual precept (local rate) to cover the council's operating costs and producing annual accounts for public scrutiny. The town council evaluates local planning applications and works with the local police, district council officers, and neighbourhood watch groups on matters of crime, security, and traffic. The town council's role also includes initiating projects for the maintenance and repair of parish facilities, as well as consulting with the district council on the maintenance, repair, and improvement of highways, drainage, footpaths, public transport, and street cleaning. Conservation matters (including trees and listed buildings) and environmental issues are also the responsibility of the council.

For local government purposes, since 1 April 2023, the parish comes under the unitary authority of Somerset Council. Prior to this, it was part of the non-metropolitan district of Sedgemoor, which was formed on 1 April 1974 under the Local Government Act 1972, having previously been part of Bridgwater Rural District. Fire, police and ambulance services are provided jointly with other authorities through the Devon and Somerset Fire and Rescue Service, Avon and Somerset Constabulary and the South Western Ambulance Service.

It is also part of the Bridgwater county constituency represented in the House of Commons of the Parliament of the United Kingdom. It elects one Member of Parliament by the first past the post system of election.

== Geography ==
North Petherton is situated on one of the historic communication routes through Somerset, and a turnpike through the town was opened between Bridgwater and Taunton in the 1730s. The opening of the nearby M5 motorway in the 1970s which relieved major traffic jams on the A38 through the town, also added to the attraction of the town for commuters and has consequently led to the construction of several new housing estates. The town lies on the route of the Macmillan Way West long-distance footpath.

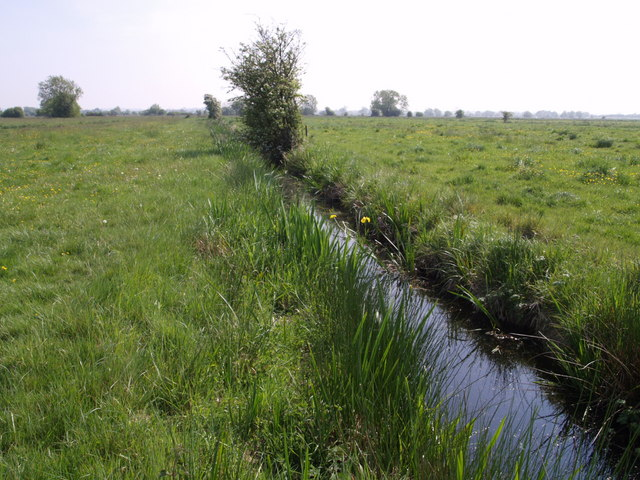
A drain on North Moor

South east of the town near Lyng, on the opposite side of the M5 motorway but within the parish is North Moor, a 676.3 hectare biological Site of Special Scientific Interest. North Moor is a nationally important grazing marsh and ditch system on the Somerset Levels and Moors. A range of neutral grassland types supporting common and scarce plants has developed mainly due to variations in soils and management practices. Aquatic plant communities are exceptionally diverse with good populations of nationally scarce species. The site has special interest in its bird life.

=== Climate ===
Along with the rest of South West England, North Petherton has a temperate climate which is generally wetter and milder than the rest of the country. The annual mean temperature is approximately 10 °C (50.0 °F). Seasonal temperature variation is less extreme than most of the United Kingdom because of the adjacent sea temperatures. The summer months of July and August are the warmest with mean daily maxima of approximately 21 °C (69.8 °F). In winter mean minimum temperatures of 1 °C (33.8 °F) or 2 °C (35.6 °F) are common. In the summer the Azores high pressure affects the south-west of England, although convective cloud sometimes forms inland, reducing the number of hours of sunshine. Annual sunshine rates are slightly less than the regional average of 1,600 hours. In December 1998 there were 20 days without sun recorded at Yeovilton. Most of the rainfall in the south-west is caused by Atlantic depressions or by convection. Most of the rainfall in autumn and winter is caused by the Atlantic depressions, which is when they are most active. In summer, a large proportion of the rainfall is caused by sun heating the ground leading to convection and to showers and thunderstorms. Average rainfall is around 700 mm (28 in). About 8–15 days of snowfall is typical. November to March have the highest mean wind speeds, and June to August have the lightest winds. The predominant wind direction is from the south-west.

== Economy ==
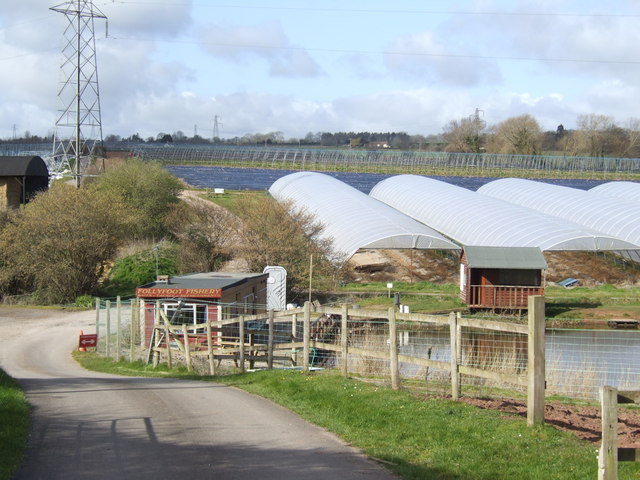
Follyfoot fishery by the A38 south of North Petherton

North Petherton used to be a market town, with the right to hold a market having been granted in 1318, along with the right to an annual fair.

In the past the town hosted a Starkey Knight and Ford brewery on Fore Street (demolished in the late 1960s), several maltings, a light engineering works (Trig Engineering, since moved to the Huntworth Business Park adjacent to the nearby Junction 24 of the M5 motorway), and in earlier times at least 7 watermills.

Basket making and the manufacture of associated products including wicker furniture, was also a significant industry, at one time employing over 100 people in small factories and homes, until its decline in the second half of the 20th century. The products were distributed nationally via the railway station at Bridgwater. Nearby King's Cliff formerly provided a source of building stone for the town dating from at least Medieval times. The production of cloth and leather goods also used to take place in the town, the former being commemorated in the name of the road known as Dyer's Green.

The extensive cider orchards that used to surround much of the town in the 19th century had largely disappeared by the end of the 20th, by which time local employment was largely restricted to service businesses and farming. Folly Foot fishery is based on a lake which is stocked with Koi, Mirror, Common and Ghost Carp.

A new £100 m Regional Agricultural Business Centre, including an extensive cattle market and dairy, opened just beyond the outskirts of the town in 2007, following construction which began in 2006. This replaced the cattle markets in both Taunton and Bridgwater.

== Education ==
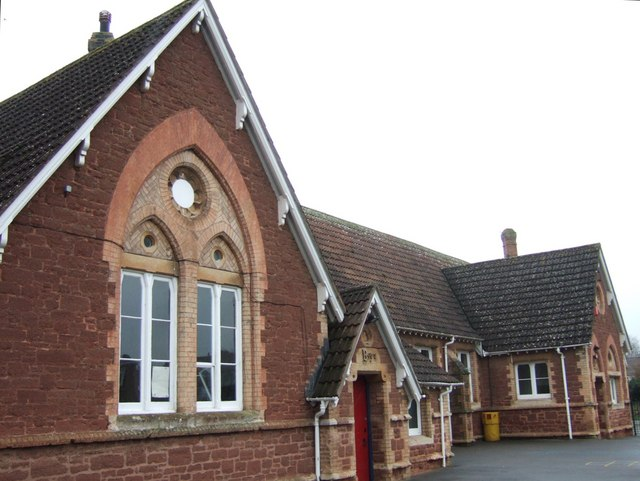
North Petherton junior school

North Petherton has two schools, North Petherton juniors and North Petherton infants, which have joined together to form one school, North Petherton Primary School.

Secondary schools in nearby Bridgwater include Robert Blake School, Brymore Academy, Chilton Trinity School, Bridgwater College Academy, and Haygrove School. Special schools in the town include Elmwood Special School, New Horizon Centre School and Penrose School.

Further education is provided by Bridgwater and Taunton College.

== Religious sites ==
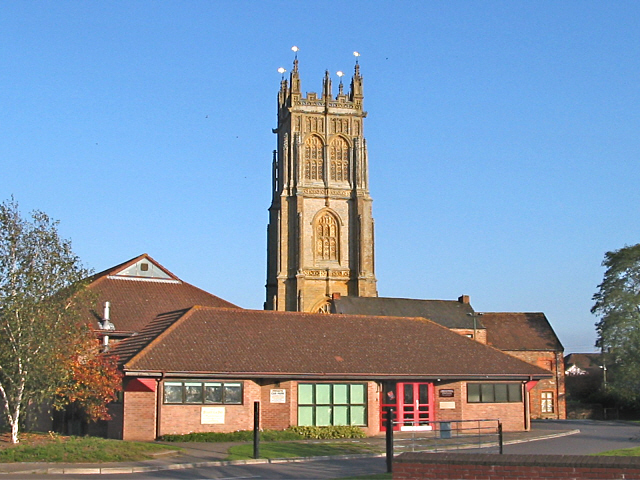
The community centre with St Mary's church tower behind

The town has the Church of St Mary the Virgin, with a highly decorated tower which, at 112 feet (34 metres) high, is claimed to be one of the tallest towers in the West Country. The building is mainly dated from the 15th century, with a minstrel gallery from 1623, a peal of six bells, and a clock built in Bridgwater in 1807. It has been designated by English Heritage as Grade I listed.

The Church of St Peter at North Newton has a tower which may be of Saxon origin which was altered in 1635. The rest of the church was completely rebuilt for Rev. Thomas Eaton in 1885. It is Grade II* listed.

The Church of St. Michael has Norman origins and has seen various restorations since. It was last restored and extended in 1868 for Slade family of Maunsel House.

In the cemetery is a 19th-century combined Non-conformist and Anglican Mortuary Chapel.

== Culture ==
The annual North Petherton Carnival is part of the West Country Carnival circuit, and takes place in November, on the second Saturday. The date of the first Carnival at Bridgwater is the previous Saturday, featuring most of the same participants.

== Twinning ==
North Petherton has been twinned with the commune of Ceaucé in Normandy, France since 1994.

== See also ==
- South Petherton
