= Edward Stanelli =

Irish-born British musician (1894–1961)

Background information
- Born: Edward Stanley de Groot; 16 June 1894; Dublin, Ireland
- Origin: London
- Died: 12 February 1961 (aged 66) Datchet, Berkshire, England
- Genres: Classical, light orchestral
- Occupations: Violinist, comic entertainer, conductor

Edward Stanley de Groot (16 June 1894 – 12 February 1961), usually known professionally by the mononym Stanelli, or sometimes Edward Stanelli, was an Irish-born British musician, composer and comic entertainer.

== Biography ==
He was born in Dublin, into a Jewish family, and moved to Brentham Garden Suburb, Ealing, with his parents as a child. He studied at the Royal Academy of Music in London, and was awarded the James Tubbs and Sons Prize for his violin playing in 1909. He went on to the Royal College of Music, and in the First World War served in the London Scottish Regiment.

He composed violin pieces, and was at different times a member of the Bournemouth Symphony Orchestra, the London Symphony Orchestra, and the Halle Orchestra. He also performed in variety shows, usually as one half of a duo, Stanelli and Douglas, or Stanelli and Edgar, in which he provided comedic introductions to their musical performances. Stanelli and Douglas appeared in the 1928 Royal Variety Performance, and Stanelli and Edgar, billed as "The Fiddle Fanatics", performed frequently on BBC radio from the early 1930s. He often performed with his "Hornchestra", a contraption of his own invention consisting of motor and other horns with different notes attached to a large metal frame. This is visible in his appearance in the 1934 film Radio Parade of 1935.

In 1935, he recorded a stag party in his own flat, and suggested to Eric Maschwitz at the BBC that an edited version be broadcast. This was done, as Stanelli's Stag Party, and led to a lengthy radio series, soon renamed Stanelli's Bachelor Party. Regular guests included Norman Long, and the two sometimes performed together as Stanelli and Long. The shows were popular, and edited versions were released as gramophone records. Stanelli also appeared with his Hornchestra on television in 1937. In 1939, he fronted a further radio series, Stanelli's Crazy Cruise, another comedy variety show, in which he played the role of a ship's captain.

He appeared in and composed the soundtrack for Greek Street (1930) and The Adventures of Jane (1949). He also acted in the films Hearts of Humanity (1936), Old Mother Riley Overseas (1943), and Dear Mr. Prohack (1949), all in small bit-parts.

Stanelli became a conductor and composer, and his work Atlantis was performed by the London Symphony Orchestra and the Hallé Orchestra in 1946, which sometimes he conducted. In the 1950s he regularly conducted the orchestra at pantomimes in the New Theatre Oxford. He ended his career as a dance band conductor. In the 1950s, he occasionally appeared on the BBC in nostalgia programmes, and appeared in panel shows and as a talent contest judge on television.

He died in Datchet, Berkshire, in 1961.
