= Male Call =

American comic strip

- Author: Milton Caniff
- Current status/schedule: Concluded
- Launch date: January 24, 1943
- End date: March 3, 1946
- Syndicate(s): US military
- Genre(s): Erotic; Humor; Gag-a-week; War

Male Call is an American comic strip series created and drawn by Milton Caniff on a volunteer basis, exclusively for US military publications during World War II. The strip began January 24, 1943. Caniff continued Male Call until seven months after V-J Day, bringing it to a conclusion on March 3, 1946.

== Spin-off strip ==
To contribute to the war effort, Caniff decided to draw a weekly comic strip and make it available at no cost to military camp newspapers. The Camp Newspaper Service was launched to syndicate Caniff's weekly page and contributions from other civilians. For CNS, Caniff created a unique version of his Terry and the Pirates, completely different in content from his regular daily and Sunday strips for the Chicago Tribune Syndicate. It premiered on October 11, 1942. Minus Terry, the CNS version focused on beautiful adventuress Burma, and she was seen in single-page situations rather than a continuity storyline. After three months, however, Miami Herald objected to this competing use of the character and complained to the Tribune Syndicate. The military spin-off version of Terry and the Pirates came to an end on January 10, 1943.

== Characters and story ==
To launch Male Call two weeks later, Caniff introduced a new character, Miss Lace, a sexy, sophisticated, dark-haired woman who mixed with the American G.I.'s (seldom officers) at various locales. The strip was a gag-a-week series aimed at boosting the morale of servicemen and was oriented towards mild humor and pin-up art. Though Miss Lace was often featured, she was not in every strip, and many strips featured one-off gags about an aspect of military life in which only military personnel are seen. Given its reading demographic, the content of Male Call was somewhat racier than was permitted in mainstream civilian publications. Nevertheless, the strip still had to pass muster with military censors.

Appearing in over half the strips, Miss Lace was a popular character of Male Call. A statuesque brunette with a penchant for wearing elegant but decidedly revealing clothing, Miss Lace was a definite male fantasy figure who was seemingly well-off and respectable, but was also unattached and accommodating. She believed to be her duty to improve morale and thus consorted freely with American G.I.'s, all of whom she called "General" (or occasionally "Admiral"), regardless of rank. Though Miss Lace would fend off the advances of those who were too forward—sometimes with a formidable punch in the face—she could be friendly and even somewhat forward herself with G.I.s who approached her with respect, and she never lacked for male attention. One strip describes Miss Lace as "sorta every G.I.'s chick ... you might run into her on a pass into town almost anywhere ... Darwin, Belfast, Algiers, Kunming, Boston, Fort Worth, Seattle, Kodiak, Indianapolis ... wherever you hope to have a good time".

Milton Caniff's "Miss Lace", the central character of Male Call. This later drawing by Caniff post-dates the strip, and is more risque than military censors would allow during Male Call's original run.

Almost no details were offered about Miss Lace's backstory, and she even point-blank refused to divulge to anyone whether "Lace" was her first or last name. She traveled and apparently lived with an unnamed Asian maid who was an occasionally recurring character. Where Miss Lace came from or how she maintained her lifestyle was never addressed, but it was strongly implied that Miss Lace was quasi-magical, a fantasy willed to life to help American soldiers win the war. Particularly sympathetic to enlisted men, she could suddenly appear at dances or in trenches, and was seemingly impervious to the realities of combat or of war material shortages.

In the final Male Call strip, published after the war, Miss Lace overheard a conversation between several veterans enthusiastically talking about their busy post-war lives, and apparently came to a realization. Walking behind a screen, she left a note saying her mission was accomplished and that "I've gone back where I came from". She then simply vanished, never to be seen again...although the note also said "I'll be there if you ever need me again."

Comics historian Don Markstein described the Male Call characters:

Miss Lace, who replaced Burma, was designed as the opposite of the earlier character — black-haired as opposed to Burma's blonde; innocent as opposed to Burma's world-wisdom; and always soft and sweet, as opposed to Burma's sometimes flinty exterior ... The only character to carry over from Burma's run was eager young PFC J. Snafroid McGoolty, a very minor player, but also the only recurring named character besides Lace herself ... Her adventures tended to be a bit on the risqué side — never to the point of totally unambiguous sexual romps, but enough to draw an occasional complaint from a blue-nose type. These rare complaints were ignored, however, as the vast bulk of reader response was thoroughly enthusiastic. Along with George Baker's Sad Sack, Bill Mauldin's Willie & Joe and Dr. Seuss' Private Snafu, Lace was among the most celebrated of World War II's military-related cartoon characters. In fact, she may have been the first comic strip character to appear on television — during July, 1945, New York City's WNBT interviewed Caniff, during the course of which model Dorothy Partington appeared in the role of Lace.

Miss Lace herself was inspired by Norman Pett's comic strip Jane, published in the British tabloid Daily Mirror from 1932 to 1959.

Caniff would first produce a strip that was done with line drawings only, and no heavy inks. This would then be sent to the military censor who would either approve it, send it back with suggested changes, or in a dozen or so instances over the course of strip's history, reject it outright. Once approved, a stencil would be made of the line drawn copy, and the original sent back to Caniff, who would then apply more inks. The stencil version would be sent to camps which ran their local paper off on mimeograph machines, while the inked version would go to those that had actual newspaper presses. Caniff had said that he invested nearly as much time into each weekly Male Call installment as he did a week's worth of episodes of Terry and the Pirates. In addition, he donated his time and talents to drawing hundreds of original unit insignia from all branches of the military.

The Camp Newspaper Service distributed the strip to more than 3000 military base newspapers, the largest number of individual papers in which any single comic strip has appeared. Male Call did not appear in any civilian newspapers.

In 1987, Kitchen Sink Press published a complete collection.

In 2011, Hermes Press published a complete reprint of the comic strip.

== Cultural legacy ==
Beginning in 1995, Dargaud published a comics series entitled Pin-Up, aimed mainly at adults, written by Yann Le Pennetier and drawn by Philippe Berthet. The series tells the adventures of Dottie Partington who models for Milton, an artist who has been commissioned to draw a strip to raise the morale of the troops. He comes up with Poison Ivy, a strip-within-a-strip, in which the titular character is a combination of Lace and Mata Hari.
