= Cornbury Park =

Estate in Oxfordshire, England

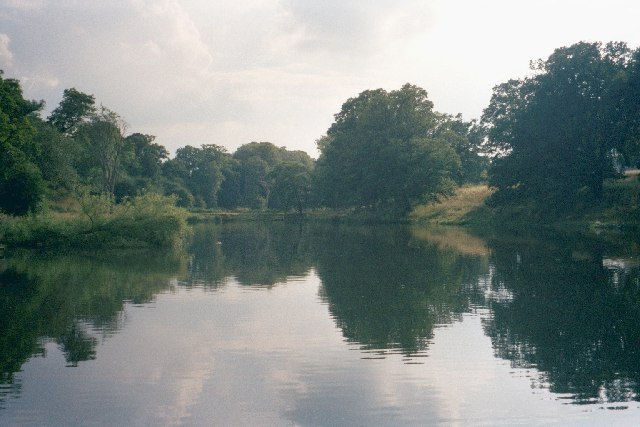
- Interactive map of Cornbury Park
- 51.8696°N 1.5161°W

Site notes
- Owner: Robin Cayzer, 3rd Baron Rotherwick

Cornbury Park is an estate near Charlbury, Oxfordshire. It comprises about 5,000 acres (2,000 ha), mostly farmland and woods, including a remnant of the Wychwood Forest, and was the original venue for the Cornbury Music Festival and later the Wilderness Festival.

== History ==
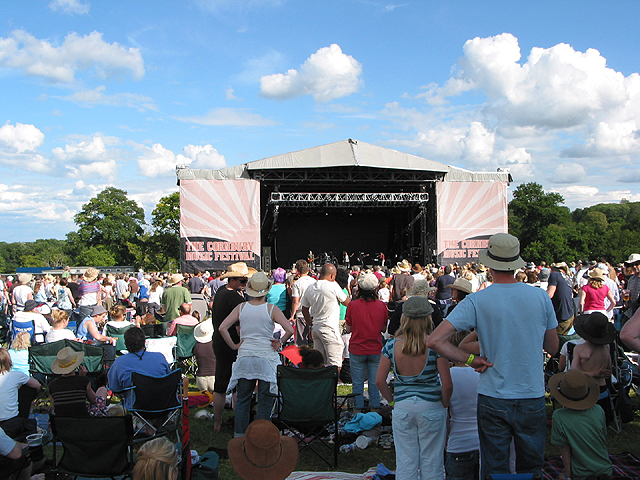
Crowds at the 2007 Cornbury Music Festival

Cornbury used to be a royal hunting estate. The park is first mentioned in the Domesday Book as a "demesne forest of the king", which was used for the hunting of deer.

== Cornbury House ==
Cornbury House is a two-storey, eleven-bay Grade I listed English country house. Built in the late 16th century, it was enlarged and altered several times, first in 1632–33 by Nicholas Stone for Henry Danvers, 1st Earl of Danby. The frontage was by the mason and sculptor Timothy Strong.

In October 1646, during the English Civil War, General Fairfax used the house as his headquarters while he and Henry Ireton oversaw the disbanding of Massey's brigade.

Further alterations were carried out in 1663–77 by Hugh May who built the east front, the stables, and the chapel (1663–68) for Edward Hyde, 1st Earl of Clarendon. In 1901–06, John Belcher removed addition of c. 1850, and altered the house further for Vernon Watney. Belcher's work was mostly demolished c. 1972.

== Current use ==
Cornbury Park is currently the home of Robin Cayzer, 3rd Baron Rotherwick, a former Conservative hereditary peer who runs it as a business. Cayzer has developed business units for rental there, and hosts the Wilderness Festival.

Cornbury House Horse Trials had its debut in 2020 and the event will return in September 2024.
