= Jane (comic strip) =

Comic strip by Norman Pett

- The cover of a 2009 reprint volume of some of the Jane comics
- Author: Norman Pett
- Current status/schedule: Defunct
- Launch date: 5 December 1932
- End date: 10 October 1959
- Alternate name(s): Jane's Journal, Or the Diary of a Bright Young Thing
- Genre: Humour
- Followed by: Jane, Daughter of Jane

Jane is a comic strip created and drawn by Norman Pett exclusively for the British tabloid newspaper Daily Mirror from 5 December 1932 to 10 October 1959.

== Creation ==
Jane was born when artist Norman Pett made a wager that he could create a comic strip as popular to adults as the strip Pip, Squeak and Wilfred was to children.

Jane was first published on 5 December 1932 as Jane's Journal – The Diary of a Bright Young Thing. Pett drew her until 1948. Mike Hubbard began assisting Pett in 1946, and eventually succeeded him.

Originally, Pett's wife Mary modelled for him, but in the late 1930s, she abandoned modelling in pursuit of golf. Pett then teamed up with Chrystabel Leighton-Porter, whom he met while she was modelling for a class in Birmingham in 1939.

== Characters and story ==
Originally entitled Jane's Journal, Or the Diary of a Bright Young Thing, the salacious comic strip featured the misadventures of the title ingenue. The heroine had a habit of frequently (and most often inadvertently) losing her clothes. Her intimate confidant was a pet dachshund named Fritz. Her full name was Jane Gay, a play on the name Lady Jane Grey.

The strip became very popular during the World War II and was considered morale-boosting, inspiring a similar American version, Milton Caniff's comic strip Male Call. Until 1943, Jane rarely stripped beyond her undergarments, but then she made a fully nude appearance when getting out of a bath and clumsily falling into the middle of a crowd of British soldiers.

Norman Pett's assistant Michael Hubbard continued, beginning in 1948, to develop the cartoon's original storyline until ending in 1959 – with charmer Georgie giving Jane a happy marriage and ending the series. The Mirror tried to revive the character on several occasions. One such comic strip was Jane, Daughter of Jane, who was apparently the original's grown-up offspring, but she lacked her mother's charm and innocence. The character returned to the newspaper in April 1985 and ran until September 1990.

== Characters ==
- Jane Gay, heroine and 'Queen of the Undie-World'
- Fritz, Jane's faithful dachshund
- Georgie Porgie, Jane's boyfriend (later husband)
- The Colonel, Jane's commanding officer and friend
- Lola Pagola, Jane's arch-enemy, also a Nazi spy
- Thelma, the Colonel's demanding and suspicious wife
- Dinah, Jane's good friend. Dinah works with NAAFI.

== Jane visits America ==
During 1945, King Features Syndicate attempted to distribute Jane in the United States, but the nudity was too much for prudish American audiences, and the attempt ceased during 1946.

Other comics in the tradition of, and possibly inspired by, Jane include Sally the Sleuth, Male Call and Little Annie Fanny.

== In the performing arts ==
During and after World War II, Chrystabel Leighton-Porter performed a striptease act as Jane. In the war, it was compulsory for actors and entertainers to join ENSA (Entertainments National Service Association) whose job it was to organize entertainment for the troops, and although Chrystabel's audience were mainly soldiers, she was never asked by ENSA to perform on the front line. Chrystabel explained:

I think they felt that my show was a little too risqué, and perhaps risky to put on for a theatre full of lusty troops! It was different when I did stage shows in provincial theatres, because although there was a lot of boys there, there was always a lot of general public too. As well, it was in a slightly more controlled environment really.

The content of the act varied due to restrictions set in by local censors.

The strip inspired an eponymous stage play during the 1940s, with Chrystabel Leighton-Porter playing Jane.

Leighton-Porter was also featured in a 1949 film, The Adventures of Jane, directed by Edward G. Whiting. A 1987 film, Jane and the Lost City, starring Kirsten Hughes in the title role, was directed by Terry Marcel.

A television series was made by the BBC between 1982 and 1984, featuring Glynis Barber in the title role. The first season was titled simply Jane, while the second was titled Jane in the Desert. Despite the early evening scheduling slot, the show was decidedly risqué with Jane continuously stripping down to her underwear, including stockings and suspenders. At the end of the second series' closing episode she appeared topless momentarily. Despite considerable publicity in the press at the time of its original screening, the show became somewhat obscure and has never had a commercial video or DVD release. The show was briefly revived during 1985 as a three-part sequence shown over a single morning on Breakfast Television but without Glynis Barber in the main role.

== Wanstone Battery ==
In World War II, one of the two 380 mm BL 15-inch Mk I naval guns comprising Wanstone Battery, which was installed at Dover and was capable of firing across the English Channel into German-occupied France, was named Jane after the comic strip character.

== Collections ==
- Saunders, Andy (2005), Jane: A Pin-Up at War, Leo Cooper, Barnsley, ISBN 1-84415-292-8.
- Pett, Norman, Jane's Journal, London: Rylee.
- ———, Another Jane's Journal, Birmingham: Thomas's Publications.
- ———, Another Journal, London: Rylee.
- Jane Souvenir
- Pett, Norman; Freeman, JHG "Don" (2009), The Misadventures of Jane, Titan. Reprints 531 daily strips from October 1943 to June 1945.
- Jane at War
