= Church of St Mary, North Petherton =

Church in Somerset, England

Church of St Mary
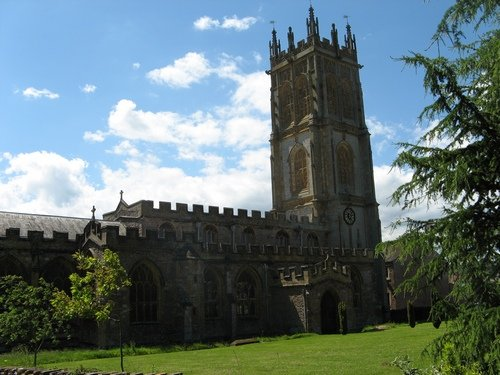

- Location within Somerset

General information
- Location: North Petherton, Somerset, England
- Coordinates: 51.0922°N 3.0148°W
- Completed: 15th century

The Church of St Mary in North Petherton, Somerset, England dates from the 15th century and has been designated as a grade I listed building. It is on the Heritage at Risk Register due to the condition of the roof and north aisle parapet.

There was a church in North Petherton before the Norman Conquest and the site belonged to Buckland Priory from the 12th century. The current building dates from the expansion of the town around 1490, although it does contain some fabric from the 13th century.

The minster church has a highly decorated tower which, at 112 feet (34 metres) high, was described by Nickolaus Pevsner as one of the finest towers in the county. The tower was built around 1508. It contains a peal of six bells, and a clock built in Bridgwater in 1807. On the stonework are hunky punks in the shape of animals.

The interior has a minstrel gallery from 1623, a carved wooden pulpit from the 15th century, and a brass chandelier which was added in 1984.

The parish is part of the Alfred Jewel benefice within the Sedgemoor deanery.

== See also ==
- List of Grade I listed buildings in Sedgemoor
- List of towers in Somerset
- List of ecclesiastical parishes in the Diocese of Bath and Wells
