= Maunsel House =

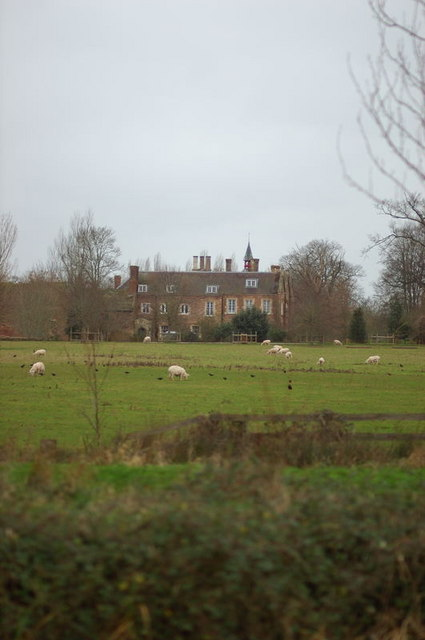

- Location within Somerset
- 51°03′56″N 2°59′38″W
- Location: North Petherton, Somerset, England

History
- Built: Late 14th or early 15th century

Site notes
- Owner: Sir Benjamin Slade

Listed Building – Grade II*
- Official name: Maunsel House
- Designated: 29 March 1963
- Reference no.: 1177930

Listed Building – Grade II
- Official name: Dairy Mead Lodge
- Designated: 9 January 1987
- Reference no.: 1060174

Listed Building – Grade II
- Official name: Granary in farmyard at rear of Maunsel House
- Designated: 9 January 1987
- Reference no.: 1295307

Listed Building – Grade II
- Official name: Range of stables and coach house, 8/110 about 10 m to rear of Maunsel House
- Designated: 9 January 1987
- Reference no.: 1344641

Maunsel House in the English county of Somerset was built in the late 14th or early 15th century. The house stands south of the hamlet of North Newton, in the parish of North Petherton. It is the family seat of the Slade baronets and is a Grade II* listed building.

== History ==
Local tradition asserts that Geoffrey Chaucer wrote part of The Canterbury Tales while staying at the house. Between 1648 and 1726 it was owned by the Bacon family who turned some the land, which had been part of Petherton Park, into gardens, orchards and a fish pond.

It has been the family seat of the Slade baronets since 1772, when it was bought at auction for £3,000. Between 1772 and 1868 wings were added to the north and west of the original building. The county surveyor Richard Carver, a pupil of Sir Jeffrey Wyattville, carried out some work in Gothic taste about 1835.

The house is now used as a wedding venue and for corporate events. To enable catering for large parties a commercial kitchen was built to fit in with the architecture of the rest of the building. In 2012 the house and the current owner Sir Benjamin Slade appeared in a television programme The Guest Wing. The house also featured in an episode of ITV's Party Wright Around the World presented by Mark Wright.

== Architecture ==
The original building consisted of an east facing hall to which a three bay addition was made in the 15th century. The left and right hand blocks were added in the 16th and 18th centuries respectively. It is stone built with fishscale tile roofs.

== Estate ==
The house stands in a 2000-acre estate and is approached via a tree-lined drive. The church of St Michael is within the grounds. One of the lodges by the driveway entrance, known as Dairy Mead Lodge, was built in the 18th century. The timber-framed granary in the farmyard at the back of the house was built in the 19th century. The range of stables and a coach house are from the 17th and 18th century. There are four self-catering holiday cottages. The Maunsel ponds within the estate are used as a match fishing venue for carp, tench and perch.
