= August Cayzer =

English shipowner (1876-1943)

Lieutenant-Commander Sir August Cayzer Bt

Chairman of Cayzer, Irvine & Co

Personal details
- Born: August Bernard Tellefsen Cayzer; 21 January 1876
- Died: 28 February 1943 (aged 67)

Lieutenant-Commander Sir August Bernard Tellefsen Cayzer, 1st Baronet (21 January 1876 – 28 February 1943) was an English shipowner.

Cayzer was the third son of Sir Charles Cayzer, 1st Baronet, head of the shipowners Cayzer, Irvine & Co. He joined the Royal Navy as a Naval Cadet in HMS Britannia. By then a lieutenant, he was in January 1901 appointed to serve on the protected cruiser HMS Diadem, serving in the Channel Squadron. In May 1902 he transferred to the armoured cruiser HMS Sutlej, leaving for the China station the following month. Cayzer left the navy later that year. He was promoted lieutenant-commander on the Emergency List in 1915. He was one of the earliest members of the Castaways' Club

On leaving the Royal Navy, he joined the family firm, later becoming chairman. He was also chairman of the Clan Line, Houston Line and Scottish Shire Line, as well as several other companies. He was a director of the Suez Canal Company.

Cayzer was created a baronet in the 1921 New Year Honours.

His elder son Nicholas Cayzer followed him into the family business.

== Footnotes ==
Baronetage of the United Kingdom
New creation	Baronet (of Roffey Park); 1921–1943	Succeeded by Nicholas Cayzer
