= Slade baronets =

Baronetcy in the Baronetage of the United Kingdom

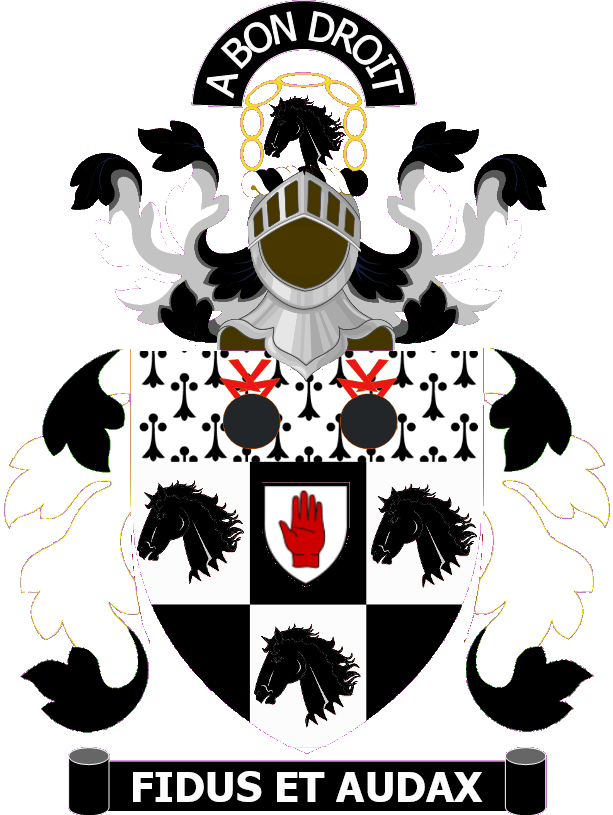
- Crest: On a mount Vert a horse’s head erased Sable encircled with a chain in form of an arch Gold.
- Shield: Per fess Argent and Sable a pale counterchanged and three horse’s heads erased two and one of the second on a chief Ermine two bombs fired Proper.
- Motto: Fidus Et Audax (below), A Bon Droit (above)

The Slade Baronetcy, of Maunsel House in the County of Somerset, is a title in the Baronetage of the United Kingdom. It was created on 30 September 1831 for General Sir John Slade, a Peninsular War veteran. The second Baronet was a lawyer. The third Baronet served as Receiver-General of Inland Revenue.

== Slade baronets, of Maunsel Grange, Somerset (1831) ==
- Sir John Slade, 1st Baronet (1762–1859)
- Sir Frederic William Slade, 2nd Baronet (1801–1863)
- Sir Alfred Frederic Adolphus Slade, 3rd Baronet (1834–1890)
- Sir Cuthbert Slade, 4th Baronet (1863–1908)
- Sir Alfred Fothringham Slade, 5th Baronet (1898–1960)
- Sir Michael Nial Slade, 6th Baronet (1900–1962)]
- Sir (Julian) Benjamin Anthony Slade, 7th Baronet (born 1946)

As of 2026 there is no heir to the title.

== Extended family ==
Madeleine Slade (Mirabehn), a disciple of Mahatma Gandhi, was the granddaughter of the 1st Baronet.

Baronetage of the United Kingdom
Preceded by Rashleigh baronets	Slade baronets of Maunsel Grange; 30 September 1831	Succeeded by Walsham baronets
