= Norman Pett =

English artist and cartoonist (1891–1960)

Norman Pett (12 April 1891 – 16 February 1960) was an English artist who, in 1932, created the famous cartoon character Jane for the Daily Mirror.

== Early life ==
Pett was born on 12 April 1891 in Kings Norton, Worcestershire. After being invalided out of the First World War, he studied art at the Press Art School. Later, he taught art at the Mosley Road Junior Art School and at Birmingham Central School of Art.

== Jane ==
In 1932, he set out to create a comic strip that would be as popular to adults as the famous Pip, Squeak and Wilfred was to children. And so, Jane was created. For the first few years, Pett's wife Mary modeled for him but eventually, he started to use professional models instead, the most famous of which was Chrystabel Leighton-Porter who modeled for him during World War II. Until the war, Jane had a little daily funny story, but at the start of the war, she became a continuous story. "The turning point in Jane's career, when she became a success, was when we turned her from a daily joke into a continuous story. In other words, when she was stripped in both senses of the term," Pett told Pathé News in 1943.

Pett retired from drawing Jane after drawing her for 16 years in 1948, and the strip was continued by Michael Hubbard.

== Death ==
He died at his home in Sussex on 16 February 1960 of undisclosed causes.
