= Caledonia Investments =

British investment trust

Caledonia Investments plc
- Company type: Public
- Traded as: LSE: CLDN; FTSE 250 component
- Industry: Investment trust
- Headquarters: London, England, UK
- Website: caledonia.com

Caledonia Investments plc is a self-managed investment trust company based in London, England. It is listed on the London Stock Exchange and is a constituent of the FTSE 250 Index.

== History ==
The company was incorporated in December 1928. In 1960 the company was listed on the London Stock Exchange and in 1981 their name was changed to Caledonia Investments PLC. After their holding in British & Commonwealth was sold in 1987, Caledonia Investments became a diversified trading and investment company, which in turn was converted into a UK Investment trust company on 1 April 2003. The Cayzer family collectively owns some 48.5% of the share capital of Caledonia Investments plc.

== Operations ==
Caledonia is a self-managed investment trust. It takes significant holdings in listed equities, private companies and funds. Taking a long term investment approach, Caledonia Investments is a value investor with a global outlook. David Stewart is the chair and Mat Masters the chief executive.
