= Cayzer baronets =

Set index for Cayzer baronets

There have been three baronetcies created for members of the Cayzer family, each in the Baronetage of the United Kingdom. As of 2026, two of the titles are extant.

- Cayzer baronets of Gartmore (1904), now subsumed by Baron Rotherwick
- Cayzer baronets of Roffey Park (1921)
- Cayzer baronets of Tylney (1924): see Baron Rotherwick

== See also ==
- Caledonia Investments
