= Empire of Death (Doctor Who episode) =

311b – "Empire of Death"
- Doctor Who episode
- Promotional title-card

Cast
- Doctor: Ncuti Gatwa – Fifteenth Doctor
- Companion: Millie Gibson – Ruby Sunday
- Others: Gabriel Woolf – Voice of Sutekh; Susan Twist – Susan Triad; Bonnie Langford – Melanie Bush; Jemma Redgrave – Kate Lethbridge-Stewart; Yasmin Finney – Rose Noble; Genesis Lynea – Harriet Arbinger; Lenny Rush – Morris Gibbons; Aidan Cook – The Vlinx; Nicholas Briggs – Voice of the Vlinx; Alexander Devrient – Colonel Christofer Ibrahim; Jasmine Bayes – Corporal Alice Sullivan; Anita Dobson – Mrs Flood; Michelle Greenidge – Carla Sunday; Angela Wynter – Cherry Sunday; Sian Clifford – Kind Woman; Amol Rajan – Himself; Aneurin Barnard – Roger ap Gwilliam; Tachia Newall – Colonel Winston Chidozie; Fela Lufadeju – Bailey Sinclair; Faye McKeever – Louise Miller

Production
- Directed by: Jamie Donoughue
- Written by: Russell T Davies
- Produced by: Vicki Delow
- Executive producers: Russell T Davies; Julie Gardner; Jane Tranter; Joel Collins; Phil Collinson
- Music by: Murray Gold
- Series: Series 14
- Running time: 2nd of 2-part story, 54 minutes
- First broadcast: 22 June 2024

Chronology
← Preceded by "The Legend of Ruby Sunday"	Followed by → "Joy to the World"

"Empire of Death" is the eighth and final episode of the fourteenth series of the British science fiction television series Doctor Who. The episode was simultaneously released on BBC iPlayer in the United Kingdom on 22 June 2024 and released on Disney+ in the United States on 21 June. It was broadcast on BBC One later on the same day. The episode was written by Russell T Davies and directed by Jamie Donoughue. It is the second part of a two-part story following "The Legend of Ruby Sunday". The combined story was also given a limited theatrical release.

In this episode, the Fifteenth Doctor (Ncuti Gatwa) and his companion Ruby Sunday (Millie Gibson) attempt to stop the god-like being Sutekh (Gabriel Woolf) from destroying all life in the universe. Filming for the story took place in June and July 2023. And was watched by 3.94 million viewers.

== Plot ==
Mel Bush helps the Doctor flee from Susan Triad. Susan and Harriet Arbinger kill everyone by releasing Sutekh's deadly dust. The Doctor and Mel reunite with Ruby in the Time Window as Sutekh arrives atop the Doctor's TARDIS. Sutekh reveals that when the Doctor defeated him previously, he latched onto the TARDIS and grew more powerful. Sutekh further explains that the dust is spreading through every place the TARDIS has ever landed through copies of Susan. The Doctor realises he and Ruby can use memories to create a 'remembered' TARDIS, which the pair and Mel use to flee.

The Doctor uses special 'intelligent rope' to stabilise the remembered TARDIS. He visits a woman who gives him a spoon that he uses to repair a monitor from the Time Window. The monitor responds to Ruby's memories and shows her a 2046 interview with Roger ap Gwilliam, the 'most dangerous prime minister in history'. The Doctor realises that because Gwilliam made DNA Tests compulsory, they can find Ruby's birth mother. Sutekh is only keeping the pair alive because he is also interested in the identity of Ruby's mother.

The Doctor, Ruby, and Mel visit the year 2046 and search DNA records for Ruby's mother. While they do this, Mel is turned into a minion of Sutekh and everyone is transported back to UNIT HQ. Sutekh attacks the Doctor and, to make him stop, Ruby says she will show Sutekh the name of her mother. Ruby instead destroys the monitor containing the identity and attaches the intelligent rope to his collar. The Doctor uses a whistle to move his TARDIS towards him, killing Harriet in the process, and attaches the other end of the rope to its console, dragging Sutekh through the time vortex and undoing all the deaths he caused. The Doctor kills Sutekh by releasing him into the time vortex.

Now freed, Susan joins UNIT, who are able to identify Ruby's birth mother, Louise Miller, a then 15-year-old girl who left Ruby because of her extreme youth and family circumstances. The Doctor explains Louise was a normal woman and that she was only assumed to be important because they believed her to be. The Doctor takes Ruby to see her mother and they reunite. Ruby decides to visit her father, and the Doctor leaves by himself after bidding her farewell. Mrs Flood explains to the audience that, while Ruby got a happy ending, the Doctor is fated to face terrible misfortune.

== Production ==
=== Development ===
The episode was written by Doctor Who showrunner Russell T Davies. It is the second part of a two-part story, the first part being "The Legend of Ruby Sunday". Davies said that he came up with the story's premise forty to fifty years earlier. It is the final episode of the fourteenth series.

When designing Sutekh, the design team wanted to recreate the original "aesthetic" of Sutekh while also making him not resemble any particular culture or time period, instead portraying Sutekh as an "ancient" and "malevolent" force. Davies stated that Sutekh was no longer an Osiran, as in Pyramids of Mars (1975), but had evolved into a god through prolonged exposure to the time vortex after clinging to the TARDIS. The team looked at sketches for Sutekh's design provided by Davies and then worked to iron out the final design. Once the design was finalised, the team used various tools to visualise Sutekh's appearance in 3D space, including virtual reality headsets. The team would also use key art to visualise how Sutekh would appear when confronting the characters. In the episode, Davies uses a meta-reference to describe the Egyptian motifs of Pyramids of Mars as cultural appropriation; the narrative of the earlier story states that Ancient Egyptian culture was derived from the Osirans.

Davies described the transportation of the Doctor and Ruby from 2046 to 2024 without actually being in the TARDIS as a "time beam". In post-episode commentary, he revealed that he regretted the use of it, and didn't intend on using the concept again.

The episode concludes the mystery of the identity of Ruby's mother first set up in the Christmas special "The Church on Ruby Road" (2023). Davies based the reveal of the identity of Ruby's mother being a regular person on the Star Wars sequel trilogy, where protagonist Rey's parents were initially revealed as "nothing special" before this was reversed in the following film. As Davies preferred the idea of Rey being "ordinary", he wrote the twist regarding Ruby's mother as his "response" to the films. In a video commentary, Davies stated that he initially intended for it to snow after Ruby reunited with her birth mother, following a motif throughout the series of snow spontaneously appearing everywhere Ruby went. He removed it following a read-through, as the producers felt it took away from the emotional impact of the moment and it was "a bit rubbish".

=== Filming ===
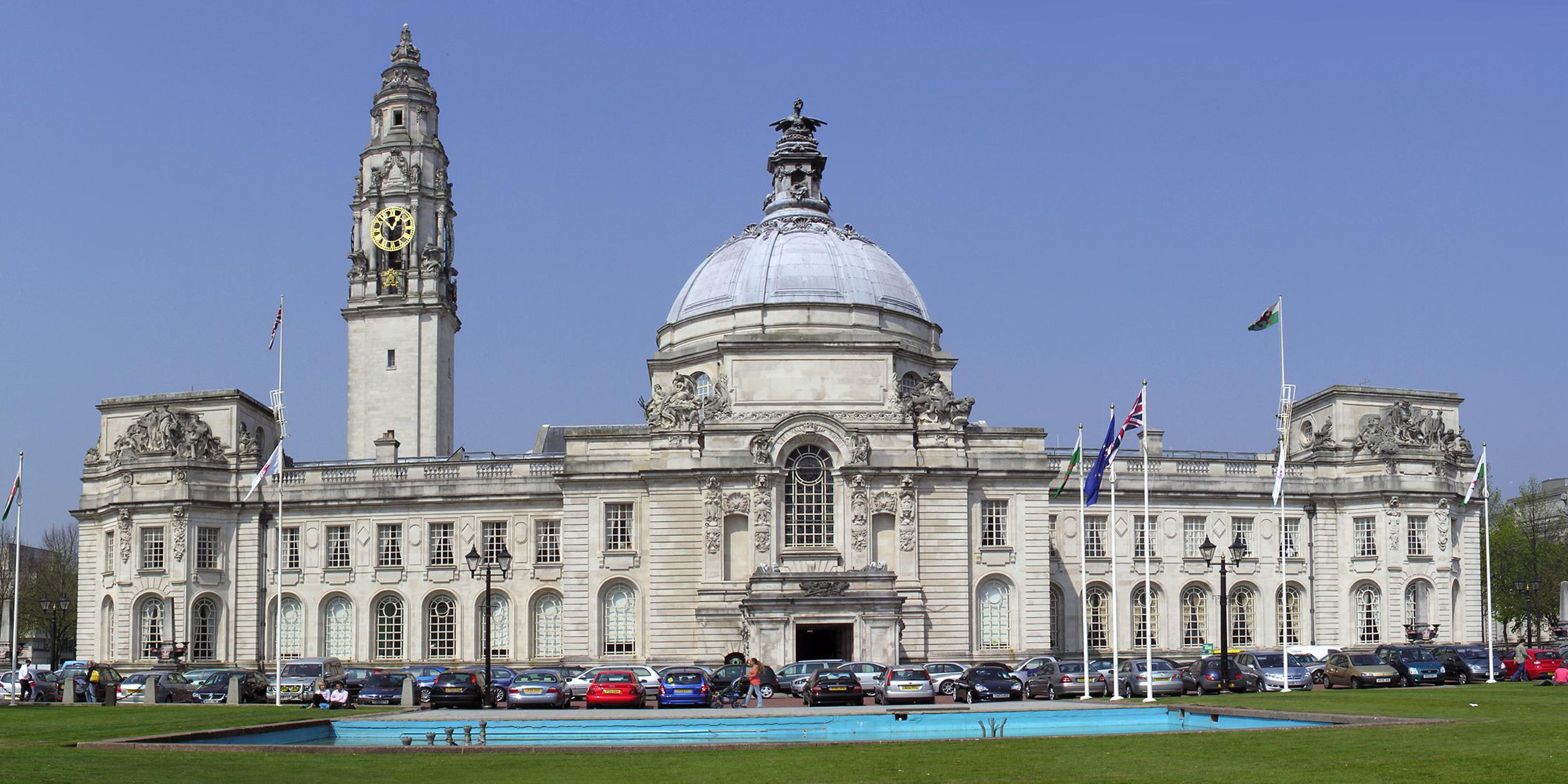
Cardiff City Hall was used as a filming location for multiple scenes in the episode.

"Empire of Death" was directed by Jamie Donoughue. He compared the two-part finale to a feature film. It was produced in the series's fifth production block, along with the preceding episode, in June and July 2023. Codenames were used while filming in public to keep the episodes' antagonists a secret. Some filming for the story occurred at One Central Square in Cardiff in June 2023. Additional filming took place near Cardiff's Principality Stadium. To make the set appear as London, it included a red double-decker bus, telephone booth, and London-dressed taxi cab. Other filming locations included the Cardiff City Hall and Barry, Vale of Glamorgan in July.

The set for the remembered TARDIS was constructed to reference past iterations of the TARDIS interior, with props from former companions and past incarnations of the Doctor being used to decorate the space. Bonnie Langford's Mel specifically notices the clothing of the Sixth and Seventh Doctors. A replica of the TARDIS console from episodes featuring Tom Baker as the Doctor was constructed and inserted into the ceiling of the set. The set was small, and thus, those filming the episode had to hold the cameras rather than use tripods or dollies. Donoughue aimed to convey the sense of claustrophobia on the set via the use of the camera. Davies originally intended on having the remembered TARDIS set destroyed after it transported the Doctor, Ruby, and Mel to 2046. This idea was scrapped due to the special effects already planned for other parts of the episode. Davies eventually got the idea to re-use the set for Tales of the TARDIS as part of Doctor Who's sixtieth-anniversary celebrations.

Bonnie Langford, who portrayed Mel, used prosthetics resembling a skull to portray Mel's transformation into a minion of Sutekh. In the scene in which the Doctor uses his whistle to summon the TARDIS, the possessed Mel and Triad are sent flying by it, which Davies described in the script as like "skittles." The production team had limited attempts to get the shot right. Stunt doubles were used to shoot the scene, and they were hoisted on ropes to convey the visual of being knocked into the air.

The final scene for the episode (and Series 14), aside from pick-ups, was filmed on 14 July 2023 with Ncuti Gatwa and Millie Gibson on the TARDIS console set at Wolf Studios Wales' Stage 6.

=== Casting ===
The episode stars Ncuti Gatwa and Millie Gibson as the Fifteenth Doctor and Ruby Sunday. Also appearing in the episode were Jemma Redgrave, Bonnie Langford, Susan Twist, Yasmin Finney, Michelle Greenidge, Anita Dobson, and Angela Wynter. Twist portrayed Susan Triad, following her appearances in a number of other roles throughout the series. Other guest stars included Nicholas Briggs (voice), Gabriel Woolf, Genesis Lynea and Lenny Rush. Aneurin Barnard guest starred as Roger ap Gwilliam, a role first introduced in "73 Yards". Davies teased an additional role in the episode that he described as "vital". This was later revealed to be Sian Clifford who appeared as a "kind woman".

== Broadcast and reception ==
Professional ratings
Aggregate scores
Source	Rating
Rotten Tomatoes (Tomatometer)	80%
Rotten Tomatoes (Average Rating)	7.3/10
Review scores
Source	Rating
CBR	5/10
Evening Standard	3/5 stars
i	3/5 stars
IGN	8/10
The Independent	2/5 stars
The Telegraph	4/5 stars
Total Film	5/5 stars

=== Broadcast ===
"Empire of Death" was released on BBC iPlayer in the United Kingdom on 22 June 2024 and was followed by a broadcast on BBC One later in the day. Disney also handled international distribution of the episode outside of the United Kingdom and Ireland, with it being released simultaneously on Disney+ in the United States on 21 June.

Two days before the episode was broadcast, Sutekh's first appearance was re-broadcast on BBC Four. A Tales of the TARDIS episode showed an edited version of the Fourth Doctor serial Pyramids of Mars (1975) with updated special effects, bookended by new scenes with the Fifteenth Doctor and Ruby.

The episode was screened in selected cinemas across the UK alongside the previous episode "The Legend of Ruby Sunday".

=== Ratings ===
Overnight viewing figures estimate that the episode was watched by 2.25 million people on its BBC One broadcast, up 200 thousand from the previous episode: Louise Griffin from Radio Times attributed the low ratings to the episode's launch on BBC iPlayer nearly 20 hours previously. Griffin stated that it was likely the episode was viewed by significantly more people.

The episode received a total of 3.94 million consolidated viewers across 7 days, and a total of 4.40 million consolidated viewers across 28 days.

The cinema showing of the episode grossed £364,253 at the box office, averaging £1,325 per site across its 275 viewings. It ranked as the fourth most profitable showing at all cinemas in the United Kingdom for the June 21–23 period.

=== Critical reception ===
On the review aggregator website Rotten Tomatoes, 80% of 15 critics' reviews are positive, with an average rating of 7.3/10. The website's consensus reads: "Closing out the season with some shaggy plotting and a reveal that will disappoint some, "Empire of Death" doesn't fully stick the landing but brings this round of adventures to a rousing enough end."

Will Salmon of Total Film praised the performances of Gatwa and Gibson, the execution of the plot and fan service, and the resolution to the storyline regarding Ruby's mother. Similarly, Stefan Mohamed of Den of Geek gave the episode a positive review, highlighting in particular the scene between Gatwa and Clifford, but felt the ending was weak due to the lack of emotional buildup throughout the season. Robert Anderson of IGN singled out the performances in the episode, mentioning Woolf and Gatwa. He went on to praise Ruby's departure scene and the appearance of Ruby's mother. Martin Belam of The Guardian praised the performance of Langford, calling it "genuinely chilling", and noted the scene in which Ruby reunites with her mother as giving the episode its emotional core. However, he criticised the episode for a lack of stakes, noting that "once whole swathes of the recurring supporting cast had met their sandy end by Sutekh's minions it seemed obvious that there would have to be a great big reset". Ed Power criticised the CGI effects, and felt that the episode was a "bland" send off to Gibson and Gatwa. Stephen Kelly called the episode "a big let-down", citing Davies' "weakness for loose plotting and rushed denouements".

== In print ==
Empire of Death
- Author: Scott Handcock
- Cover artist: Dan Liles
- Series: Doctor Who book: Target novelisations
- Publisher: BBC Books
- Publication date: 10 July 2025
- Pages: 192
- ISBN: 9781785949531

A novelisation of this episode and "The Legend of Ruby Sunday" under the title Empire of Death was written by Scott Handcock and is due to be released on 10 July 2025 as part of the Target Collection. The audiobook will be read by Twist and the cover was designed by Dan Liles.
