= Doctor Who series 14 =

2024 season of British sci-fi TV series

Doctor Who
- Series 14
- DVD box set cover art
- Showrunner: Russell T Davies
- Starring: Ncuti Gatwa; Millie Gibson
- No. of stories: 7
- No. of episodes: 8 (+1 special)

Release
- Original network: BBC One; Disney+
- Original release: 11 May – 22 June 2024

Season chronology
- ← Previous; 2023 specials Next → Series 15

The fourteenth series of the British science fiction television programme Doctor Who premiered on 11 May 2024, and aired through to 22 June. The series is also known as "Season One" following the production changes and the acquisition of Doctor Who's international broadcasting rights by Disney+. It is the fifth series led by Russell T Davies as head writer and executive producer and the first since his return to the show, having previously worked on it from 2005 to 2010. This series is the fourteenth to air since the programme's revival in 2005, and the fortieth season overall. The fourteenth series was announced with Davies' return for its 60th anniversary in 2023 and beyond, with Bad Wolf becoming a co-producer.

The series is the first to star Ncuti Gatwa as the Fifteenth Doctor, a new incarnation of the Doctor, an alien Time Lord who travels through time and space in the TARDIS, which appears to be a British police box from the outside. The Fifteenth Doctor was introduced in "The Giggle" (2023) through a "bi-generation", in which he split from his predecessor, the Fourteenth Doctor (David Tennant), rather than replacing him. The series also introduces Millie Gibson as the Doctor's newest companion, Ruby Sunday.

Preceded by a Christmas episode on 25 December 2023, the series consists of eight episodes directed by Julie Anne Robinson, Ben Chessell, Dylan Holmes Williams, and Jamie Donoughue. Alongside Davies, who wrote six of the episodes, the writers are Kate Herron, Briony Redman, and former showrunner and head writer Steven Moffat. Filming began in December 2022 and concluded in July 2023. It was the first series to be produced at Wolf Studios Wales, following the move from Roath Lock Studios for the preceding anniversary specials. Reviews for the series were mostly positive, although some criticised the resolution to its story arc.

== Episodes ==
Doctor Who series 14 episodes
| No. story | No. in series | Title | Directed by | Written by | Original release date (Note: Episodes for the fourteenth series were released simultaneously at 12 a.m. BST in the United Kingdom on BBC iPlayer (followed by a 7 p.m. BBC One broadcast the same day), and at 4 p.m. PT the day prior in the United States on Disney+.) | UK viewers (millions) | AI |
|---|---|---|---|---|---|---|---|
Special
| 304 | – | "The Church on Ruby Road" | Mark Tonderai | Russell T Davies | 25 December 2023 | 7.49 | 82 |
Nineteen years ago, a hooded woman abandons her baby outside a church. In the present day, the foundling – Ruby Sunday – is trying to find her birth parents using a DNA test, to no avail. After an interview with Davina McCall, Ruby finds herself repeatedly experiencing bad luck and has several encounters with the Fifteenth Doctor. After her adoptive mother, Carla, fosters another baby, Ruby witnesses goblins kidnapping the baby and boards their flying ship to save her, encountering the Doctor again. Held captive by the goblins, the Doctor reveals the goblins have manipulated time to cause Ruby's bad luck and feed on coincidence – namely Ruby and the baby sharing a birthday on Christmas Eve. The Doctor and Ruby save the baby from being eaten by the goblins and return her home. Coincidences binding the Doctor and Ruby lead to the goblins time-travelling and eating Ruby as a baby. The Doctor travels back nineteen years to save baby Ruby, destroying the goblins and their ship. Returning to the present day, the Doctor and Ruby reunite but he goes to leave in the TARDIS. Ruby deduces the Doctor is a time traveller and accompanies him.
Series
| 305 | 1 | "Space Babies" | Julie Anne Robinson | Russell T Davies | 11 May 2024 | 4.62 | 75 |
The Doctor takes Ruby to a space station in the future orbiting another planet. After discovering a monster in the station's lower decks, the pair discover a crew of talking babies operating the ship in the upper levels. After mistaking the Doctor and Ruby as their parents, the crew explain that they have been alone for six years, under the care of NAN-E, who is discovered to be Jocelyn, the last member of the station's original crew who stayed when the crew were ordered to abandon the station. The Doctor and Ruby investigate the creature, nicknamed the Bogeyman, and learn that it was genetically grown from leftover baby mucus, just as the babies were grown by the ship. Jocelyn tries to eject the creature from an airlock, but Ruby and the Doctor stop her. Afterwards, the Doctor repairs the station and allows Jocelyn, the babies and the Bogeyman to make their way towards their new home. He invites Ruby to officially accompany him but warns her that he can never take her back to the day of her birth. Instead, Ruby asks to go back to see Carla and her grandmother Cherry, as the Doctor starts to scan Ruby's DNA.
| 306 | 2 | "The Devil's Chord" | Ben Chessell | Russell T Davies | 11 May 2024 | 4.24 | 77 |
In 1925, a music teacher shows his student the tritone or the "devil's chord", which summons a being called Maestro, who kills the teacher by consuming the music from his heart. At Ruby's request, the Doctor takes her to London in 1963 to see the Beatles record their first album at EMI Recording Studios. They discover from John Lennon and Paul McCartney that the world has lost its taste for music, which the Doctor fears will alter humanity's future. He has Ruby play a song, gaining the attention of Maestro, who is consuming music from every human. After escaping from Maestro, the Doctor takes Ruby to her present, discovering the world in a nuclear winter. Maestro appears, revealing themself as a child of the Toymaker with the power to manipulate the power of music. They take control of the TARDIS, forcing the Doctor to return to the studios in 1963. There, he and Ruby try to find the chord to banish Maestro, but the two are powerless. John and Paul arrive to play the chord that traps Maestro, who portends the coming of the "One Who Waits" to the Doctor. Music returns, and the Doctor and Ruby engage in a musical number before leaving in the TARDIS.
| 307 | 3 | "Boom" | Julie Anne Robinson | Steven Moffat | 18 May 2024 | 3.63 | 78 |
After the TARDIS lands on the war-torn planet of Kastarion 3, the Doctor accidentally steps on a landmine. The Doctor is forced to remain standing on the landmine, lest he risk triggering it. Ruby and the Doctor converse with an A.I. recreation of a soldier, John Francis Vater, recently killed by an "ambulance" due to his recovery time being deemed too long. The war's equipment is manufactured by Villengard, which controls its products with an algorithm that maximises profit. Vater's daughter, Splice, and later two other soldiers, arrive on the battlefield. In the ensuing confusion, Ruby is mortally wounded after one of the soldiers mistakes her for a threat. The Doctor explains to the soldiers the war was falsely created by the algorithm, as there are no enemies, and the soldiers have instead been fighting their Villengard-controlled equipment, which includes the landmines. The Doctor sends Vater's A.I. into the ambulance, serving as a virus to overpower the algorithm, deactivate the mine, and make the ambulance revive Ruby. With the conflict on Kastarion 3 ended, the Doctor and Ruby depart.
| 308 | 4 | "73 Yards" | Dylan Holmes Williams | Russell T Davies | 25 May 2024 | 4.26 | 77 |
After landing in Wales, the Doctor accidentally breaks a fairy circle containing messages mentioning someone named "Mad Jack", before then suddenly disappearing. Ruby begins being followed by a mysterious woman who, though appearing to stand still, maintains a constant distance of 73 yards away from her. Anyone who approaches the woman runs from both her and Ruby in fear. Years pass, with Ruby attempting to maintain a normal life while still being followed. In 2046, Ruby overhears a campaign speech by Roger ap Gwilliam (whom the Doctor had previously mentioned as causing nuclear destruction after becoming prime minister), in which Roger calls himself "Mad Jack". Infiltrating Roger's election team, Ruby is able to position the woman next to Roger, causing him to fearfully resign as prime minister. Over 40 years later, a now elderly Ruby is approached by the woman, before then being sent back in time to her younger self's arrival in Wales with the Doctor. The older Ruby is able to influence her younger self into warning the Doctor from breaking the fairy circle, preventing his disappearance.
| 309 | 5 | "Dot and Bubble" | Dylan Holmes Williams | Russell T Davies | 1 June 2024 | 3.62 | 77 |
Lindy Pepper-Bean is a citizen of Finetime, a community of white, wealthy young adults on a colonised alien world in a bubble-enclosed city surrounded by dangerous "Wild Woods". The people of Finetime experience life through a bubble-shaped social media interface, managed through individual metal spheres called Dots. Lindy notices several of her friends missing. The Doctor and Ruby appear on her bubble, warning her of extreme danger. Dropping the bubble, Lindy sees giant slug-like creatures eating the residents. The Doctor and Ruby instruct Lindy to escape via a conduit and await rescue by their families from "Homeworld". She meets another resident, Ricky September, who learns Homeworld has already been consumed. The Doctor realises the Dots became sentient and created the slugs to eat the colonists. When Lindy and Ricky are cornered, Lindy selfishly saves herself and abandons Ricky to die. Out of prejudice, the survivors turn down the Doctor's offer of help and choose to take their chances in the Wild Woods.
| 310 | 6 | "Rogue" | Ben Chessell | Kate Herron and Briony Redman | 8 June 2024 | 3.66 | 77 |
The Doctor and Ruby arrive in England in 1813 and partake of a fancy party. While Ruby spends time with Emily, one of the guests, the Doctor discovers Rogue, a bounty hunter from the future tracking down a Chuldur, a shapeshifter who takes the form of its victims as a form of cosplay, whom he plans to trap and incinerate. Despite Rogue initially thinking the Doctor is the shapeshifter, he proves Rogue wrong, and the two develop a romance. The Doctor then convinces Rogue to send the Chuldur to an alternate dimension instead. Deducing the Chuldur are attracted by scandal, the two dance at the party. Afterwards, they act like Rogue is proposing with a ring to the Doctor, but the Doctor runs away, drawing the attention of four Chuldur at the fête. The Doctor uses Rogue's trap to catch the Chuldur, but inadvertently traps Ruby, who had discovered Emily was also a Chuldur. The Doctor thus hesitates to engage the trap's transport. However, Rogue grabs the device, pushes Ruby out, takes her place and asks the Doctor to come find him before activating the transport. The Doctor, heartbroken, is comforted by Ruby. Before leaving, he puts on Rogue's ring and looks to the stars with a smile.
| 311a | 7 | "The Legend of Ruby Sunday" | Jamie Donoughue | Russell T Davies | 15 June 2024 | 3.79 | 81 |
The Doctor and Ruby visit UNIT headquarters to investigate a mysterious woman who has continuously appeared in their previous adventures across time and space. UNIT are already aware of her as tech entrepreneur Susan Triad, whose staff Mel has infiltrated. The Doctor also wants to identify Ruby's birth mother. Using UNIT's Time Window, the Doctor and Ruby enter a 3D projection of Christmas Eve 2004, but Ruby's mother is inexplicably obscured. An entity appears and kills a UNIT officer. Mel brings the Doctor to meet Susan, who reveals she has dreamt of being the individuals the Doctor observed. UNIT discover the entity concealed a second instance of the TARDIS in 2004. Theorising the entity already invisibly surrounds the TARDIS, Kate Lethbridge-Stewart demands it show itself. UNIT analyst, Harriet Arbinger, is revealed to be a servant of the Pantheon and delivers an unsettling monologue in a demonic voice as the entity manifests in the form of a Set animal. Susan transforms into a ghoulish figure and reveals that the name "Susan Triad Technology", or "Sue Tech", represents Sutekh, the god of death, and an old enemy of the Doctor. Sutekh declares his intention to kill everything in the universe.
| 311b | 8 | "Empire of Death" | Jamie Donoughue | Russell T Davies | 22 June 2024 | 3.94 | 80 |
Sutekh reveals he latched on to the TARDIS after being defeated by the Doctor previously, (Note: As seen in Pyramids of Mars (1975)) and has since left an incarnation of Susan Triad everywhere the TARDIS went. These incarnations kill almost all life in space and time. The Doctor, Mel, and Ruby escape within a 'remembered' TARDIS (Note: Also seen in Tales of the TARDIS (2024)) created using the Time Window. The Doctor realises they can find Ruby's birth mother and Sutekh keeps the pair alive because he also cannot perceive her identity. While the Doctor and Ruby search a DNA database, Mel is turned into a minion of Sutekh and transports everyone to UNIT HQ. Ruby and the Doctor trick Sutekh and use the time vortex to resurrect everyone. The Doctor kills Sutekh by releasing him into the vortex. UNIT finds Ruby's birth mother, a then 15-year-old who left Ruby because of her youth and abusive stepfather. She is a normal human, her cosmic importance only coming from people believing she had to be special. Ruby reunites with her now 35-year-old mother and intends to visit her birth father. The Doctor leaves, promising Ruby he will return. Mrs Flood tells the audience that while Ruby got a happy ending, the Doctor's story will end in absolute terror.

== Casting ==
=== Main characters ===
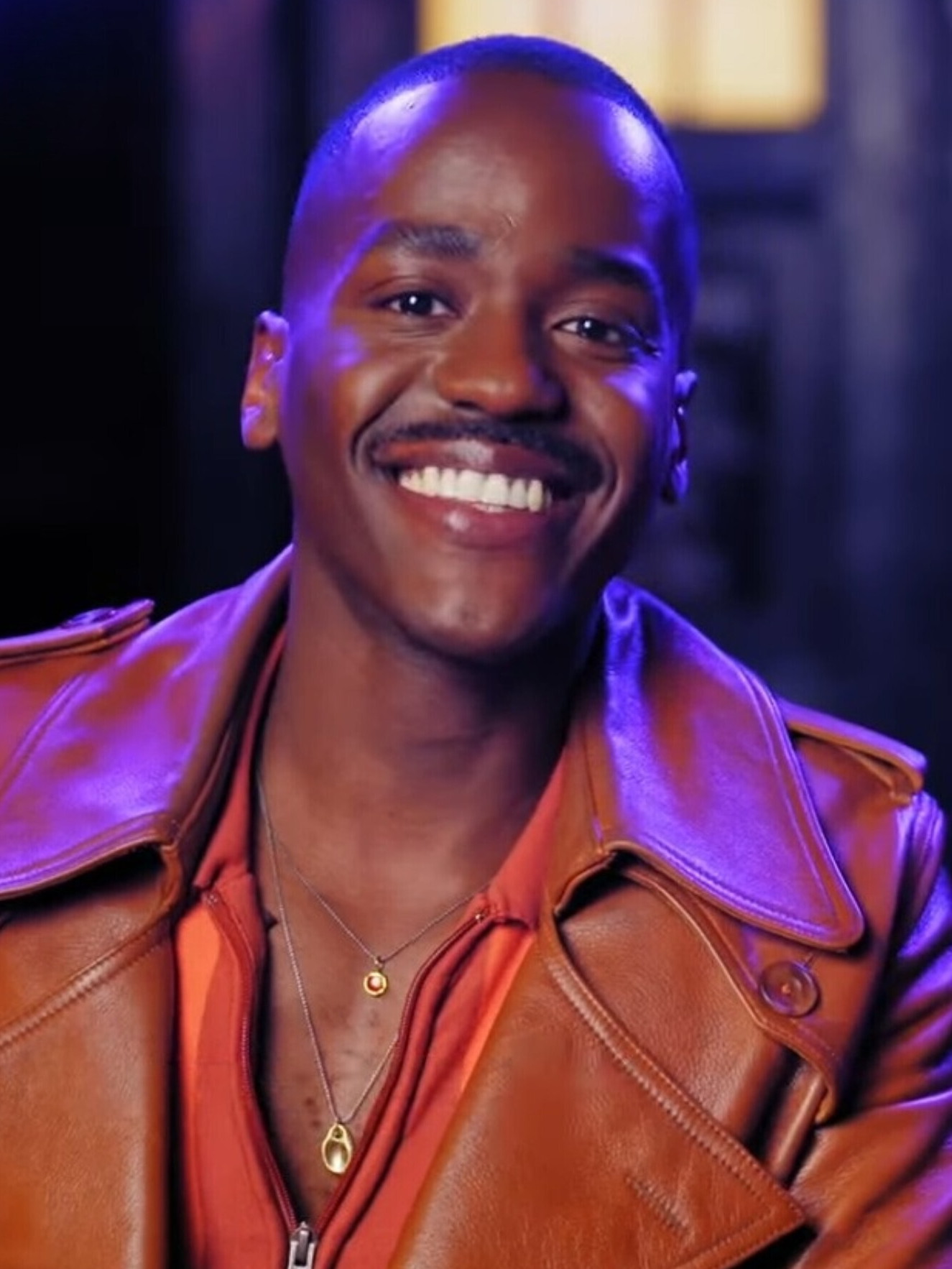
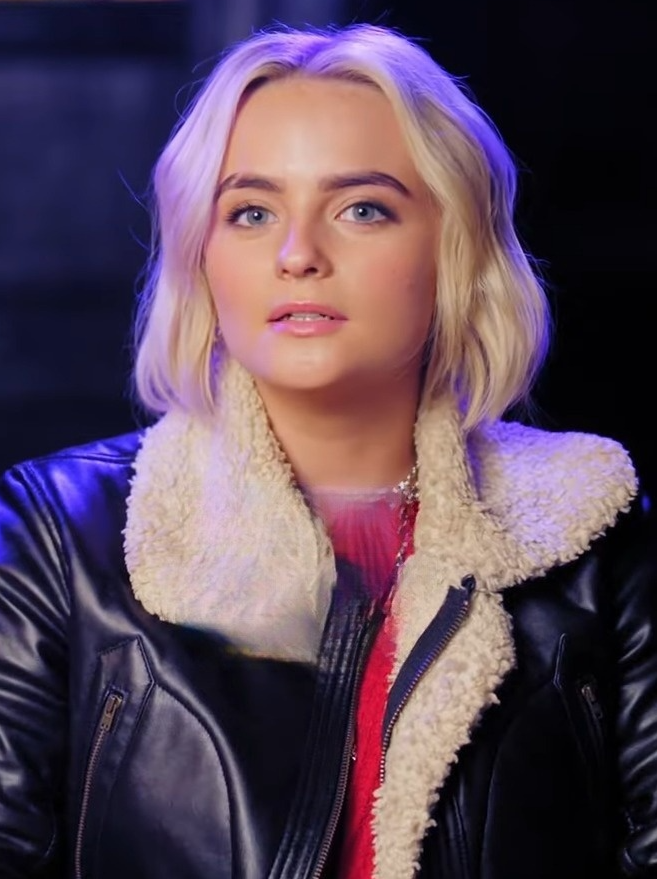
Ncuti Gatwa (left) and Millie Gibson (right) appear in their first series as the Fifteenth Doctor and Ruby Sunday.

Auditions for the role of the Fifteenth Doctor started in December 2021, assisted by casting director Andy Pryor. Davies was interested in casting "new talent" and someone "younger", with most of the actors who auditioned under the age of 30. There was no limit on gender or background, with auditions held for men, women, and one non-binary actor. Pryor said of casting the Doctor: "you always want someone unexpected... [you want] an actor who contrasts with what's gone before yet still brings those essential qualities that the Doctor has". Ncuti Gatwa was the final candidate to audition for the role. Gatwa was previously best known for his role as Eric Effiong in Sex Education. Davies said that the production team "thought [they] had someone and then in he came and stole it", describing it as "the most blazing audition". Executive producer Phil Collinson stated that Gatwa "did things with [the role] that I'd never seen an actor playing Doctor Who do".

I was thinking about what a terrible world it is now, and how many stresses of mental health there are in young people. I wanted a hero who wasn't closed, who wasn't all stiff upper lip. And [who] wasn't swaggering or butch, either. When children are feeling scared of the future, and when they're on TikTok laughing hilariously with their friends, the life of a young person, I think, is bigger and madder and wilder and richer than it was when I was young, where we just sat there and went to school.

— Russell T Davies

Davies wanted a "more emotional Doctor" who's open about their feelings and "carries those emotions on the surface more visibly instead of hiding them away." He described this iteration as "a hero for a young audience"; contrasting the Doctor to traditional superheroes who "punch through walls", but instead he's the "cheeky kid at the back of the classroom". Gatwa was cast in February 2022, and was officially announced as "the new Doctor" on 8 May 2022. Gatwa described the role as "an institution", and said that "unlike the Doctor, I may only have one heart but I am giving it all to this show." Many reports stated that Gatwa would play the Fourteenth Doctor and that Jodie Whittaker's Thirteenth Doctor would regenerate into an incarnation portrayed by Gatwa. Upon Whittaker's final appearance as the character, she instead regenerated into a form seemingly identical to the Tenth Doctor. This character, portrayed by David Tennant, was confirmed to be the Fourteenth Doctor, with later clarification that Gatwa would actually portray the Fifteenth Doctor. Davies admitted that the team placed "a few false stories" in the media to inhibit any guesses of Gatwa.

Davies wanted this Doctor to have an "energetic" and "youthful" relationship with Ruby Sunday, his new companion. Millie Gibson was suggested due to Davies' familiarity with Coronation Street and her role as Kelly Neelan. Gibson attended in-person auditions on 24 September 2022 at the Bad Wolf production offices in London. Gatwa was also present for the audition. He said that he felt that his Doctor "needed someone that has that same sort of slightly tapped, slightly crazy energy", which Gibson delivered in her audition; and described their pairing as the equivalent to "two troublemakers". Gibson was cast nearly three weeks later on 12 October 2022. During Children in Need on 18 November 2022, Gibson was officially announced as the Fifteenth Doctor's companion. According to writer Steven Moffat, Davies described Ruby in early stages as "the classic companion - she's not a quirky 'different' one", adding that she's similar to the likes of Amy Pond and Rose Tyler, two previous companions in the show. Davies said that he wanted to continue his tradition of inventing companions who start as "the most ordinary people", capturing the essence that "the TARDIS could land on a street corner and take anyone... who doesn't want to go to those endless horizons?". Davies elaborated on the character of Ruby, stating:

Ruby, bless her, turns out to be wonderful and brave and, yes, very special. But her actual life's very small. She lives with her mum and her gran. She's earning 50 pounds playing a keyboard in bars. She's living a low-key life before she meets the Doctor, and it's only after she embarks on these adventures that her specialness comes to the fore.

In December 2023, Gatwa commented that he was told off for using profanity while in-costume, and that the younger audience of Doctor Who contrasted with what he had become used to from his previous role on Sex Education.

=== Recurring and guest characters ===
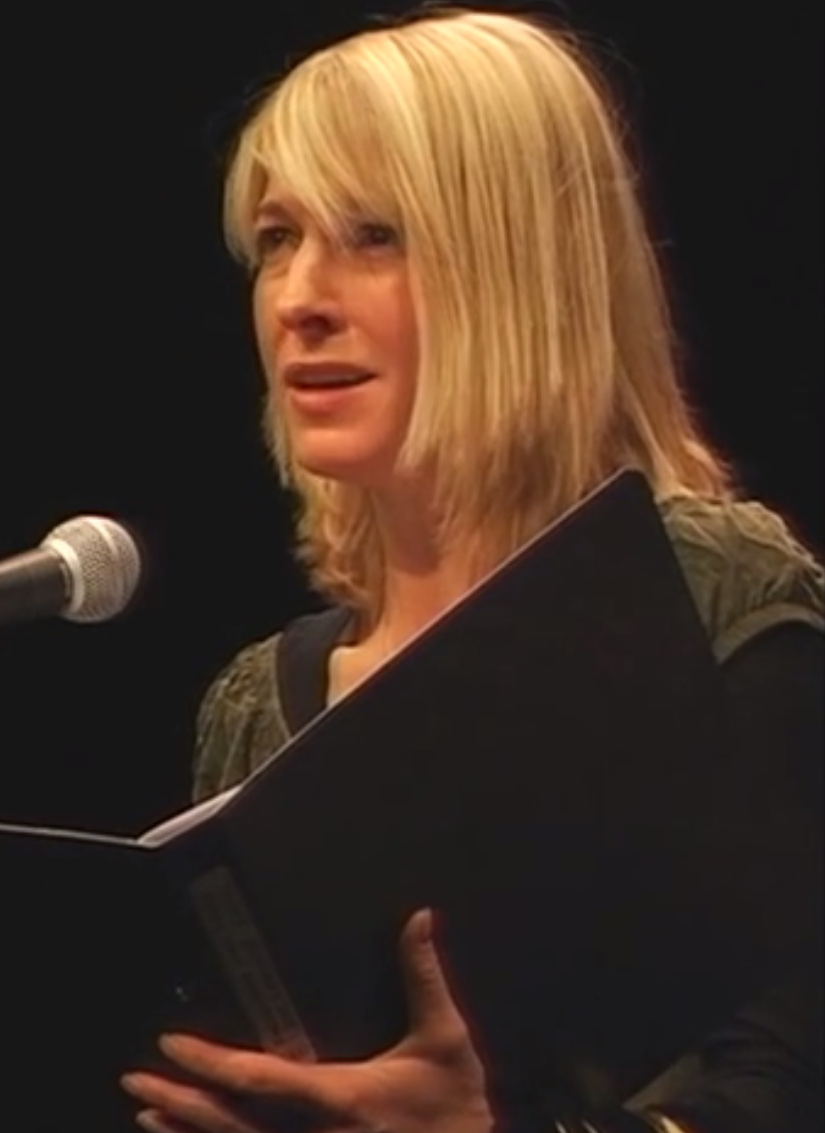
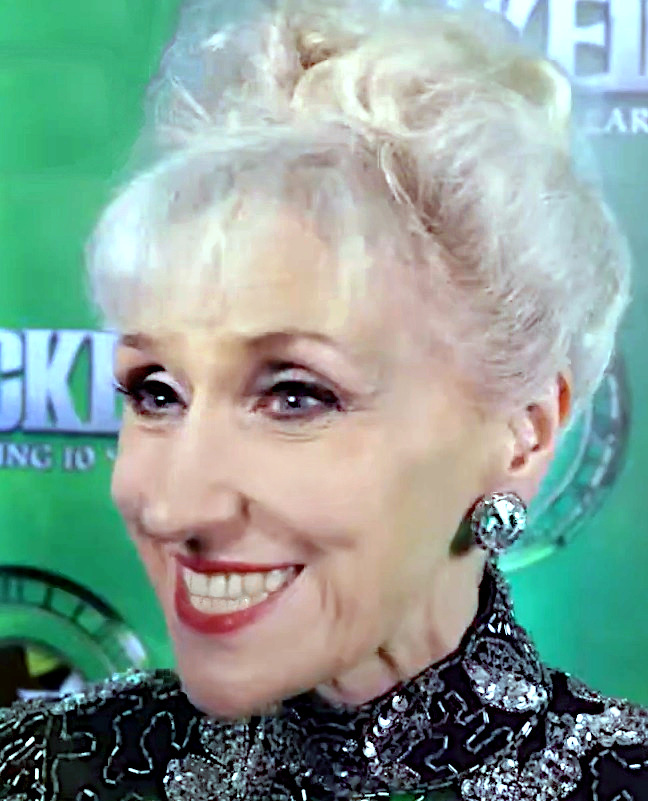
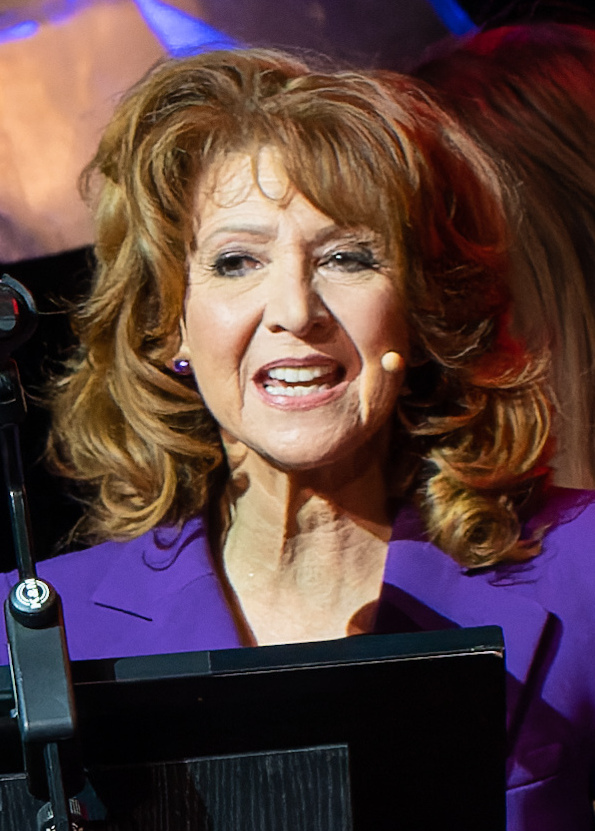
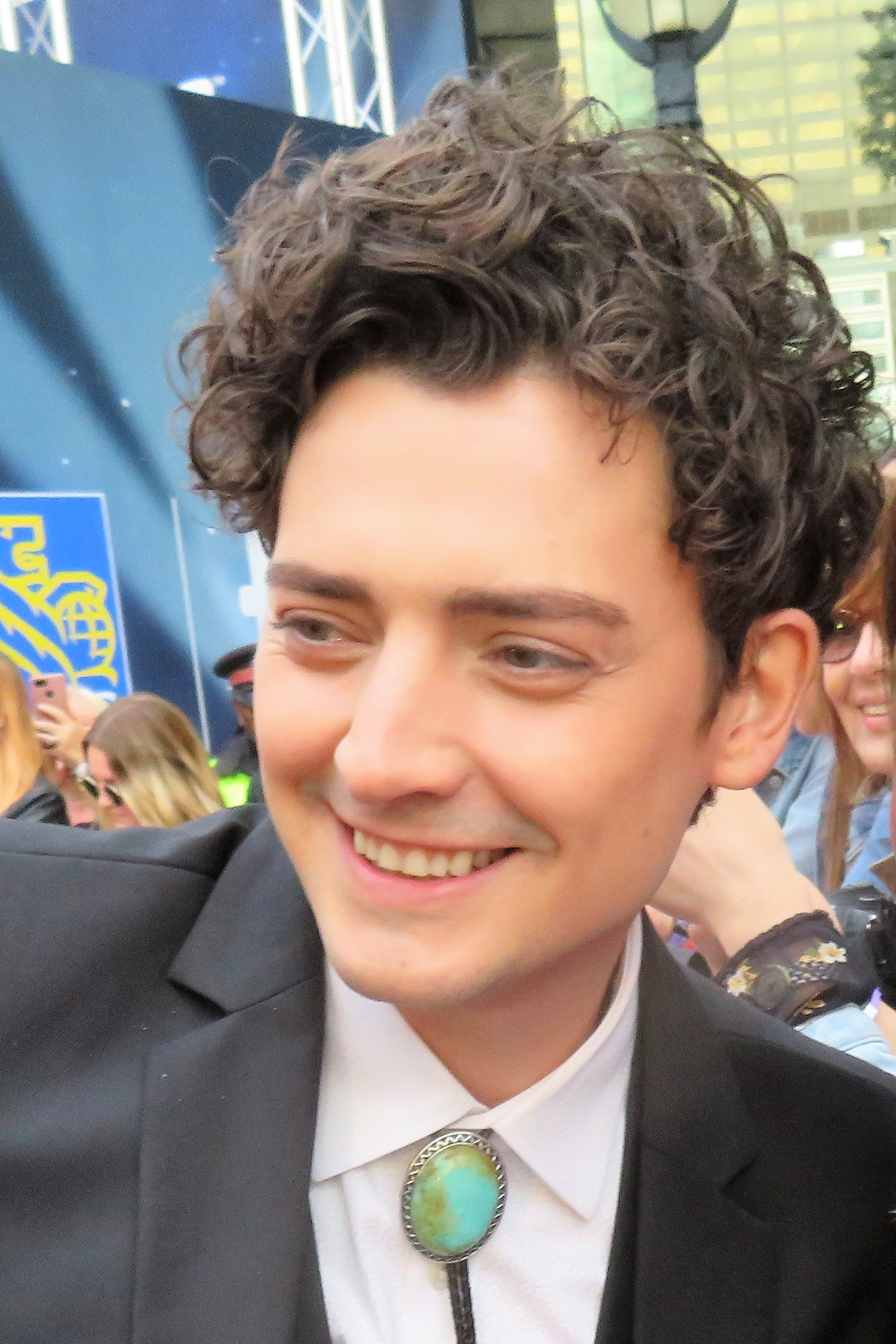
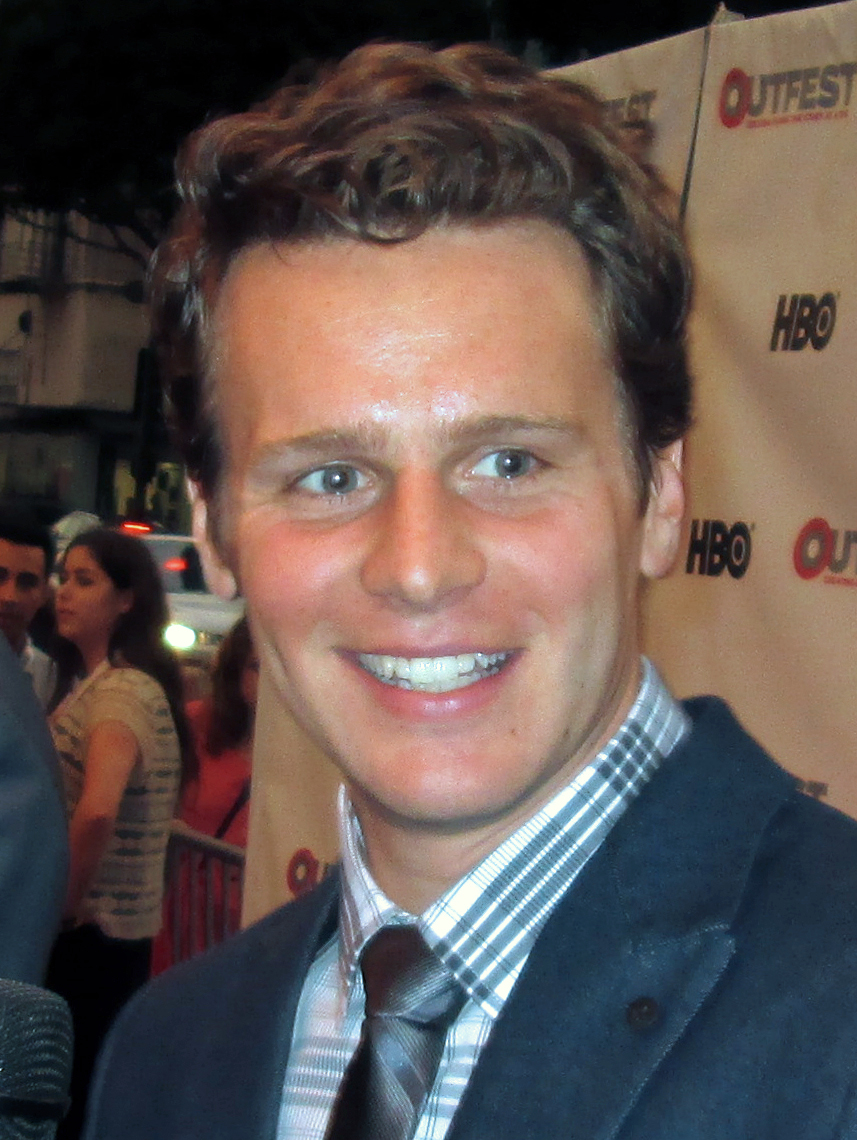
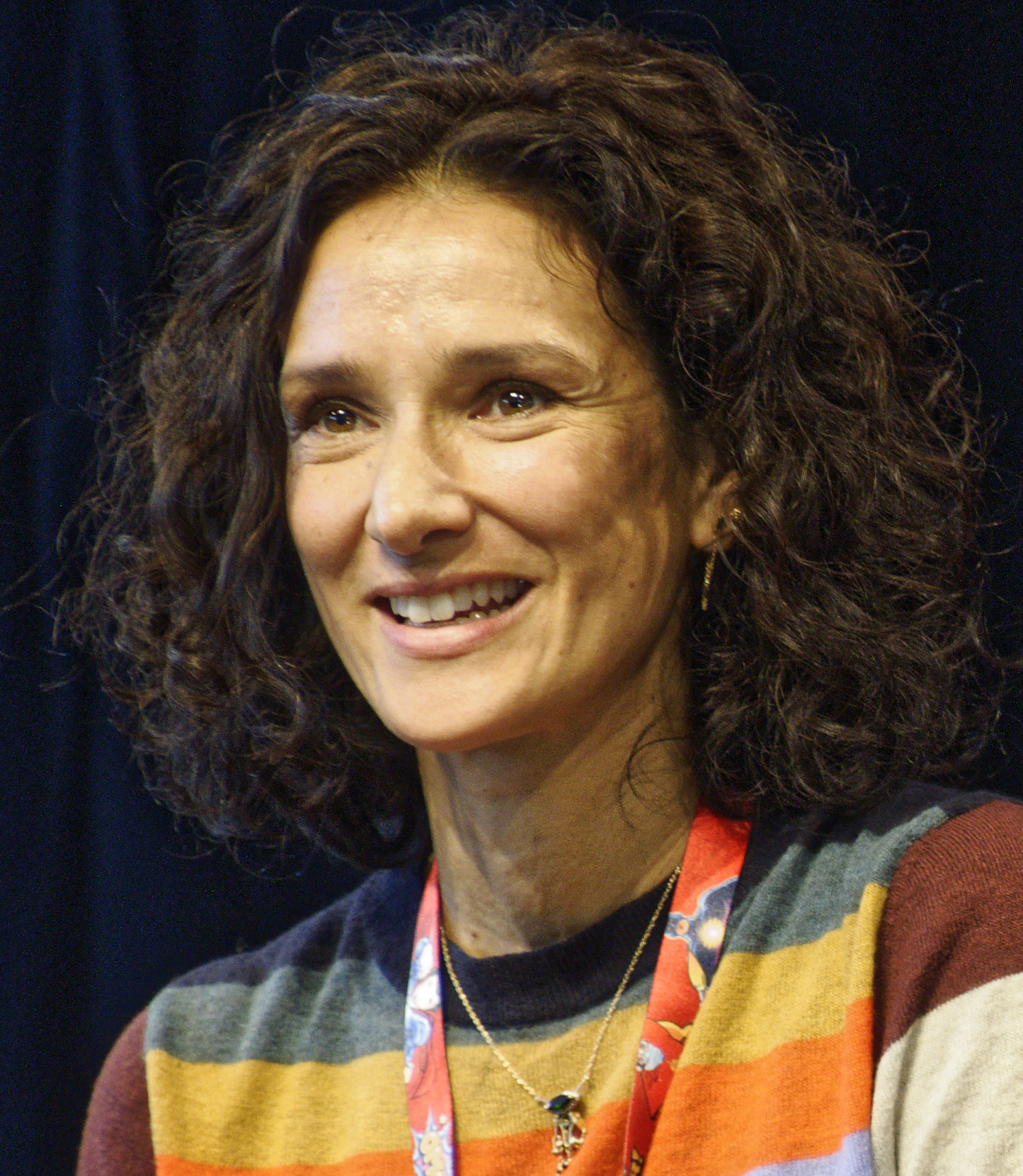
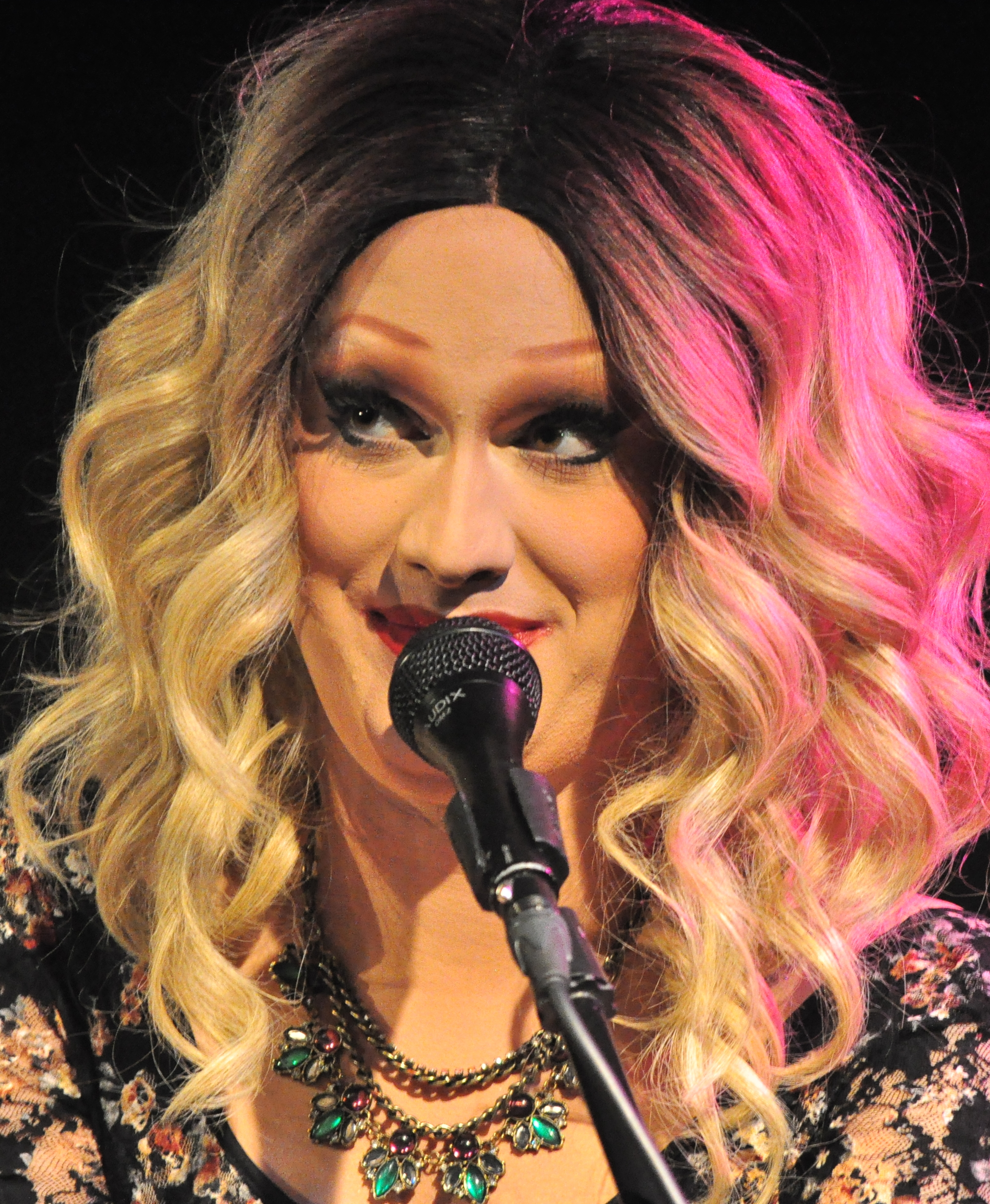
Multiple actors held supporting roles in the series.

Clockwise from top left: Jemma Redgrave, Anita Dobson, Bonnie Langford, Jinkx Monsoon, Indira Varma, Jonathan Groff, and Aneurin Barnard.

After being introduced in "The Church on Ruby Road", Michelle Greenidge and Angela Wynter recurred throughout the series as Carla and Cherry Sunday, Ruby's adoptive mother and grandmother. Anita Dobson also appeared in multiple episodes as Ruby's neighbour Mrs Flood. Jemma Redgrave returned to her role as UNIT leader Kate Lethbridge-Stewart once again, as she did in the 2023 specials, appearing in three episodes. Following her appearance in "Wild Blue Yonder" (2023) as Mrs Merridew, Susan Twist held multiple roles in the series' first six episodes as seemingly disparate characters. In the two-part finale, Twist had a final role as Susan Triad, which revealed connections between the characters. Alexander Devrient and Yasmin Finney returned from the 2023 specials to portray Colonel Christopher Ibrahim and Rose Noble. Nicholas Briggs also reprised his role as the voice of the Vlinx. Gabriel Woolf returned to the programme to voice Sutekh, a character he previously voiced in the 1975 serial Pyramids of Mars. Bonnie Langford appeared as former Doctor Who companion Mel Bush.

The first guest star announcement for the series occurred on 9 January 2023 when it was revealed that Aneurin Barnard would appear as Roger ap Gwilliam. Davina McCall played a fictionalised version of herself in the Christmas special. Lenny Rush was cast to voice baby Eric in "Space Babies", but after producers were impressed by his performance, Rush was promoted to the role of UNIT scientific advisor Morris Gibbons. Jinkx Monsoon joined the series to play a "major role", later revealed to be Maestro in "The Devil's Chord". Varada Sethu, who had previously been announced as a new companion for the fifteenth series, made a surprise appearance in "Boom" as Mundy Flynn. Davies said her role in series 15 would not be the same character, but that the two would be connected. An additional guest role in the series was announced to be played by Jonathan Groff. Groff ultimately portrayed the titular character in "Rogue". Indira Varma, who previously starred as Suzie Costello in the Doctor Who spin-off series Torchwood, appeared as the Duchess of Pemberton in the same episode. Paul Forman was cast as Lord Barton. Seven additional guest stars were revealed on 31 March 2024 which included Golda Rosheuvel, Callie Cooke, Siân Phillips, Bhav Joshi, Majid Mehdizadeh-Valoujerdy, Tachia Newall and Caoilinn Springall. Other guest roles were played by Amol Rajan, Tom Rhys Harries, Genesis Lynea, and Sian Clifford.

== Production ==
=== Development ===
The series is the first to be produced under an international streaming partnership with Disney Branded Television, after the company bought rights in 2022 to stream future episodes on Disney+, starting with the 2023 specials. The BBC were interested in finding a streaming partner to "transform Doctor Who into a global franchise". Davies' vision aligned with the BBC's, adding that the show deserves to be amongst "the big hitters" in the modern streaming world. He also wanted the show to have a higher production value, with the Disney partnership elevating the show's budget. Davies explained that "if you want Doctor Who to have a bigger budget, it's not right that it comes from the licence fee—it is right that we go to a bigger broadcaster, a bigger platform, and go into co-production with them." Before any scripts had been written, Davies pitched "the concept of the entire first series" to Disney, providing them with a "rough format of how it would go and the shape of it and what it would look and feel like." Disney reportedly signed a two-season order for the show.

To coincide with launching the show on Disney+, the series was rebranded as Season 1. Davies explained that continuing with "series 14" could turn away new audiences on the platform; adding that "the reason why it's survived for all these years is that every so often, Doctor Who stops, opens the door and refreshes itself, and gets a new audience in." Former showrunners Steven Moffat and Chris Chibnall had considered similar titles for their debut series. Davies wanted to modernise the show and "bring 2024 to it", with "new energy" and "territory we've never touched before"; with an aim to make it "madder, wilder and funnier". He also wanted to push "the sense of fun" into the show "because I think we need it... In this day and age, come and have fun." Davies wanted the series to be an escape from a "tough world": "I want people, of all ages, frankly, to turn from the news and to turn from whatever aggression there is online and to come to a nice, safe space, where we'll have a good time." According to Davies, the BBC wanted the show to strengthen its engagement with the younger demographic, with Davies tasked with creating a "simpler and younger" version of the programme.

Julie Gardner, Jane Tranter, Phil Collinson and Joel Collins all continued to serve as executive producers alongside Davies, with Bad Wolf co-producing the show alongside BBC Studios and Disney Branded Television. Moffat was credited as executive producer of the third episode, "Boom", for which he wrote the script and led the production process. Julie Anne Robinson, director of "Space Babies" and "Boom", also executive-produced those episodes.

=== Writing ===
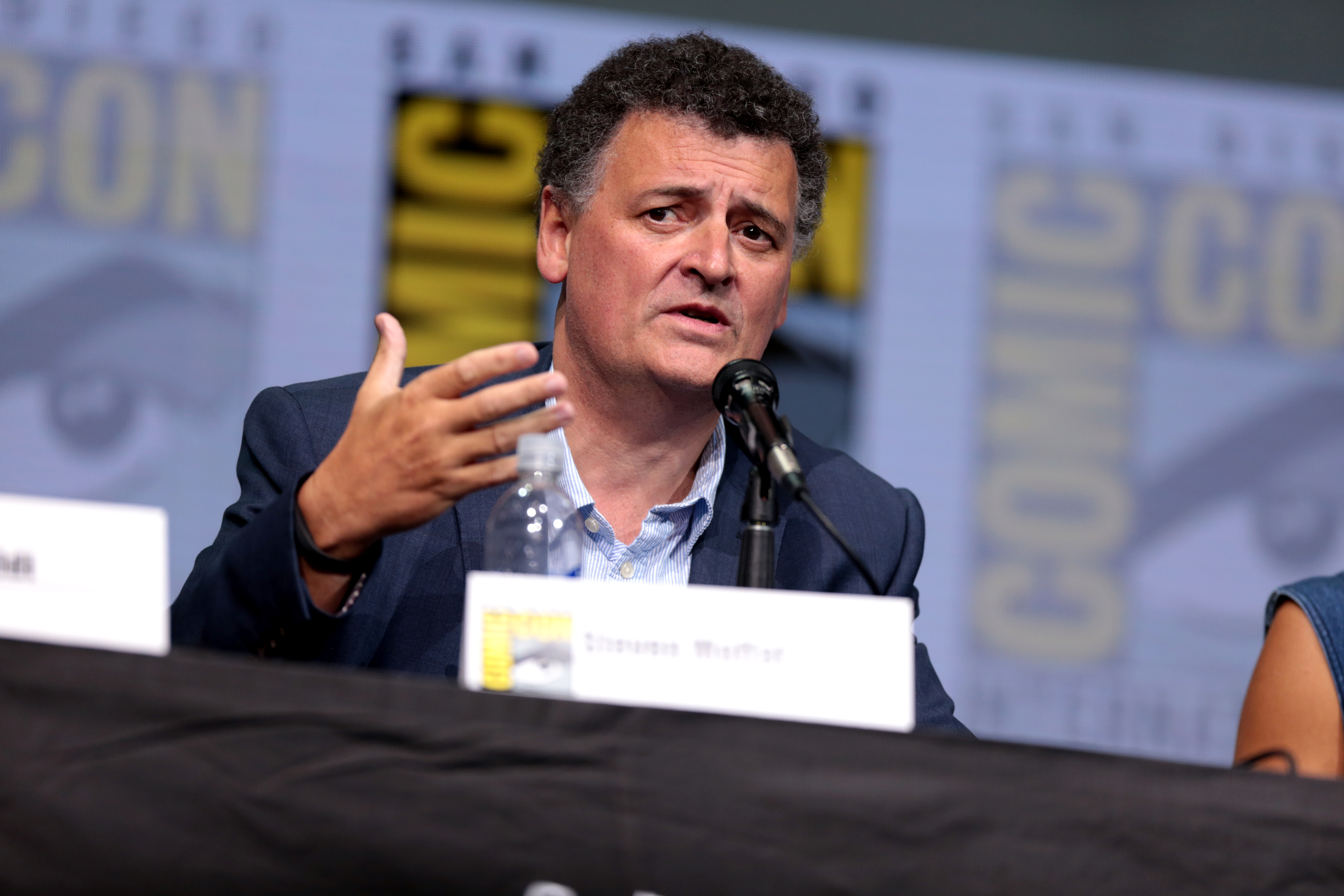
Steven Moffat, who served as showrunner and head writer from 2010 to 2017, returned to write and executive-produce the third episode of the series.

Davies wrote the 2023 Christmas special and the bulk of the series, while guest writers were invited for the third and sixth episodes. Former showrunner and head writer Steven Moffat returned to write "Boom". Davies contacted Moffat in September 2021 and told him about his plans for the show. Moffat pitched several ideas to Davies, before landing on the concept that became the third episode. Davies also reportedly asked Chris Chibnall, who had served as showrunner from 2018 to 2022, to return as a guest writer, but this offer was declined. "Rogue" is co-written by first-time writers for the show, Kate Herron and Briony Redman. Scott Handcock served as script editor. The series features an episodic format, with the first six episodes serving as standalone stories, before concluding with a two-part series finale. Davies compared it to an "anthology series - every week, a new time and place", while also containing "little hints and hooks here and there which might build up to something" in the final episodes. Like his first series in 2005, Davies didn't want the series to be clogged with backstory for first-time viewers, and ensured that the basic foundations would be discovered again through the eyes of the companion.

Davies created a mystery arc for the companion Ruby Sunday; a "foundling" who wants to track down her birth parents but has no trace. He was inspired by episodes of Long Lost Family: Born Without Trace, a series which attempts to reunite foundlings with the parents who abandoned them. Davies wanted the companion's story to have correlations with the Doctor's story, with both of the characters being abandoned and adopted as children, a continuation of the Timeless Child story arc introduced in the Thirteenth Doctor's era. He believed this would create a unique bond between the Doctor and Ruby, and the question of a person's background and their family history would "strike a chord" with the audience. Davies intended for an "almost fairytale fashion" to Ruby's backstory, describing it as "Dickensian". The Christmas Eve backdrop to this story meant that the theme of Christmas could be "weaved" into the whole series; this is demonstrated through the appearance of snowflakes each time Ruby's story is mentioned. Davies also created a mystery hook that sees each episode feature a new character played by the same actress, Susan Twist, with neither the characters nor the audience knowing why. He described the hook as a form of "internet-age storytelling", with the hope that it would "generate content". Other hooks include the TARDIS groaning ominously, and Ruby's enigmatic neighbour Mrs Flood.

The Christmas special introduces Ruby and establishes her story arc. Davies said that this episode is the case of "a story interrupted"; the story being Ruby's birth, and "a Time Lord is obviously going to start winding himself into that story in the way that no one else can"; those events would draw the Doctor to Ruby's life in the present-day, where "there's something beginning to just stir around her very existence", via her string of bad luck. It was intended for this story to leave a lot of questions hanging for the first episode of the series; Davies explained that the Christmas story would have carried "too much weight" if it had introduced the Doctor entirely, and therefore "he remains a mystery to [Ruby] for much of the episode". He described it as "a dance between the two characters meeting but not meeting, kind of circling around each other... so you feel the gravity of them drawing them towards each other and the weight of the plot making that gravity happen." Tonally, Davies wanted the special to be "joyous" and "pure, pure Christmas"; adding that it needed to be a "big centrepiece".

Adopting the traditional monster-of-the-week formula, the series features a variety of genres and settings across its episodes. The intention was to make the show "really, really different every week". The two-part season finale is a disaster plot on modern-day Earth with key ongoing story threads reaching their peak, including the discovery of Ruby's birth mother, and the answers behind Susan Twist's characters. Davies wanted a finale that would "generate electricity" and serve as an "end-of-season showdown", equal to the heightened stakes of his previous finale "The Stolen Earth" / "Journey's End" (2008). The finale reintroduces the classic series enemy Sutekh, previously seen in the serial Pyramids of Mars (1975), with Davies wanting to "prove that the show hasn't severed its roots". He also wanted the finale to answer all of the key questions, except for the Mrs Flood story, which was created as a "slow-burn" and would "very clearly lead" to the next series.

Following up on the Toymaker's return and warning in "The Giggle", Davies wanted this series to take a "sly step" into fantasy; with more supernatural antagonists including gods and legendary creatures. Gatwa added that "a whole pantheon full of different villains and lore and mythology" would be introduced in the series. The use of goblins as the special's antagonists is the first example of the series leaning into the fantasy genre. Davies explained that some of the most powerful gods in the series would form part of "the pantheon", a legion of villains connected to the Toymaker. This included Maestro in "The Devil's Chord", the god of music, and Sutekh in "The Legend of Ruby Sunday" / "Empire of Death", the god of death. He stated that Doctor Who is more exciting when the enemy is "someone changing all of time and space around them." Elaborating further on why he opted for a more supernatural approach, Davies said that he wanted the show to start deviating from a predictable narrative structure and "break those rules", lending the chance to "have fun and go wild" with the stories and have enemies that seem "impossible to beat".

It was the freedom... [to] take the wheels off the bike and take the roof off the room and lift things into the world of fantasy. The hard thing is finding a way to defeat [the pantheon]. I mean, it becomes very hard for me to think of ways for them to be defeated. And therefore it becomes hard for The Doctor to think of ways for them to be defeated. So I love that. Even now I'm having to invent rules that will pin them down.

— Russell T Davies

=== Filming ===
Pre-production for the series began on 26 September 2022, with the first readthrough held at Bad Wolf Studios on 30 November 2022. Soundstage and backlot filming took place at Bad Wolf. For certain episodes, the series employed "top-of-the-range technology" such as virtual LED screens and the use of drones in-studio, to depict alien landscapes and boost visual scale, similar to the tech used by Marvel and Star Wars. Location filming was based across Cardiff and other locations around Wales. Some of these sets stood in for locations in London, with the production team changing street signs and zebra crossings, among other things, to further the resemblance.

Principal photography began on 5 December 2022, with the first production block — consisting of "73 Yards" and "Dot and Bubble" — directed by Dylan Holmes Williams. Gatwa was largely absent during this block, due to his commitments on the fourth season of Sex Education. This resulted in two consecutive 'Doctor-lite' stories. Davies explained that hiring Gatwa for the role, despite his availability conflicts, was a risk they were willing to take to secure "the best possible Doctor in 2024 that we could wish for." Filming for the second block — consisting of the 2023 Christmas special "The Church on Ruby Road" — began during the first week of February 2023, directed by Mark Tonderai. Tonderai had previously directed the eleventh series episodes "The Ghost Monument" and "Rosa" (both 2018). The third production block — consisting of "Space Babies" and "Boom" — entered production in March 2023, directed by Julie Anne Robinson. Block 3 was almost entirely studio-bound, with both episodes covering futuristic, off-world settings which were achieved on soundstages. The fourth production block — consisting of historicals "The Devil's Chord" and "Rogue" — began filming on 19 April 2023, directed by Ben Chessell. The fifth production block — consisting of the two-part finale "The Legend of Ruby Sunday" / "Empire of Death" — began filming on 5 June 2023, directed by Jamie Donoughue. On 15 July 2023, Davies confirmed that filming had concluded for the series the previous day, Friday 14 July 2023.

Production blocks were arranged as follows:

Order of Doctor Who series 14 production blocks
| Block | Episode(s) | Director | Writer(s) | Producer | Ref. |
|---|---|---|---|---|---|
| 1 | Episode 4: "73 Yards" | Dylan Holmes Williams | Russell T Davies | Vicki Delow | |
| 1 | Episode 5: "Dot and Bubble" | Dylan Holmes Williams | Russell T Davies | Vicki Delow | |
| 2 | Christmas special: "The Church on Ruby Road" | Mark Tonderai | Russell T Davies | Chris May | |
| 3 | Episode 1: "Space Babies" | Julie Anne Robinson | Russell T Davies | Vicki Delow | |
| 3 | Episode 3: "Boom" | Julie Anne Robinson | Steven Moffat | Vicki Delow | |
| 4 | Episode 2: "The Devil's Chord" | Ben Chessell | Russell T Davies | Chris May | |
| 4 | Episode 6: "Rogue" | Ben Chessell | Kate Herron and Briony Redman | Chris May | |
| 5 | Episode 7: "The Legend of Ruby Sunday" | Jamie Donoughue | Russell T Davies | Vicki Delow | |
| 5 | Episode 8: "Empire of Death" | Jamie Donoughue | Russell T Davies | Vicki Delow | |

=== Music ===
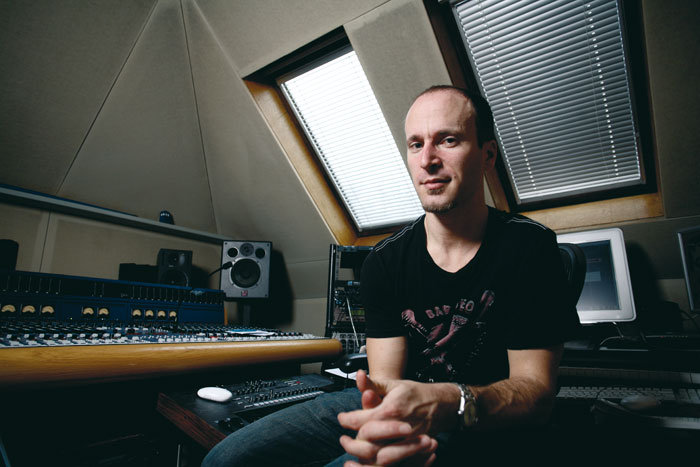
Murray Gold composed the series' soundtrack.

Murray Gold returned to compose the soundtrack for the 2023 Christmas special and the fourteenth series. Work on the series' score began in early 2023. Themes for the Fifteenth Doctor and Ruby Sunday, titled "Fifteen" and "The Life of Sunday" respectively, were performed live for the first time as part of Doctor Who @60: A Musical Celebration in September 2023.

"The Goblin Song" was written by Davies and composed by Gold, along with the BBC National Orchestra of Wales, for the musical number during "The Church on Ruby Road". This was released as a charity single for Children in Need on 11 December 2023, peaking at Number 12 in the UK Singles Sales Chart. The song was performed by Christina Rotondo as Janis Goblin, with verses from both Gatwa and Gibson, which were performed during the shoot. The track was composed at the Wales Millennium Centre in January 2023; and was played at the special's readthrough. Gold described the song as "really fun" and said that Davies has "always wanted to just make Doctor Who as musical as possible".

"The Devil's Chord" ends with a three-minute musical number, which includes vocals from both Gatwa and Gibson. Gold was tasked with writing and composing the song during pre-production for the second episode. Davies wanted a "celebratory" ending after music is restored: "I want the screen to burst, I want that fourth wall to start breaking down", with Gold adding that "the whole episode really rests on this big release of emotion". He was also briefed by the production team to write "some really bad Beatles songs" for the scenes where music is failing. According to Gold, Davies sent him an email asking him to "just make it funny", and he wrote the songs in "about 15 seconds".

"Rogue" featured orchestral covers of songs by Billie Eilish and Lady Gaga, as well as including tracks from Willy Wonka & the Chocolate Factory and Kylie Minogue.

== Release ==
=== Promotion ===
On 30 November 2023, the title, synopsis and guest cast for "The Church on Ruby Road" were revealed. A trailer for the special was released after "The Giggle" on 9 December 2023. The cast attended a press launch at the BFI Southbank on 12 December 2023, where Gatwa and Gibson lit the London Eye blue; this was part of a "Doctor Who takeover" of the London South Bank, which featured an interactive 'Art of Regeneration' sculpture, and a showcase of the Fifteenth Doctor's sonic screwdriver. Gatwa appeared on The Graham Norton Show on 15 December 2023 to promote the special, where a preview clip was shown.

On 25 December 2023, the first teaser trailer for the fourteenth series was shown on BBC One after the airing of "The Church on Ruby Road", confirming that the series would start in May 2024. On 18 February 2024, the first promotional poster was released on social media. The premiere date and new broadcast plans were announced on 15 March 2024, along with the release of a second teaser trailer and poster. Davies said it was his "great delight to unleash a whole new season of the Doctor and Ruby's adventures together". A March 2024 press release teased that the series will feature "adventures all the way from the Regency era in England, to war-torn future worlds".

Disney+ released its official trailer for the series on 22 March 2024. A remix of the song Changes by David Bowie was used as the soundtrack to the trailer. On 31 March 2024, the titles of each episode were revealed individually on social media with 30-minute intervals, leading to a new trailer. In April 2024, magazines such as Empire, SFX and Entertainment Weekly featured interviews with Gatwa, Gibson and Davies promoting the series. On 25 April, a double-decker bus toured locations in Central London before arriving at Regent Street Cinema for the UK press launch. Gatwa and Gibson promoted the series in New York City; advertisements were streamed on billboards in Times Square, and interviews were featured on Good Morning America, ABC News and Late Night with Seth Meyers. A replica of the TARDIS appeared at Downtown Disney in California ahead of the premiere. A Doctor Who-branded New York City Subway train was seen running through Times Square, with the carriages encompassing artwork for the series.

Radio Times magazine released three collectable covers starring the Doctor and Ruby for its 4–10 May 2024 issue. Preview clips from "Space Babies" were released on 4 and 5 May. Gatwa appeared as the Doctor on Match of the Day alongside the show's presenter Gary Lineker in an opening sketch to promote the series. Disney Branded Television hosted the US press launch at NeueHouse Hollywood in Los Angeles on 8 May 2024. The same day, Billboard released an exclusive clip from "The Devil's Chord"; with a second clip released by the BBC on 10 May.

Following the series conclusion, Gatwa, Gibson, and Davies appeared at the 2024 San Diego Comic-Con, where they discussed the fourteenth series in a panel moderated by Josh Horowitz. Davies also participated in a panel with Alex Kurtzman, the showrunner of multiple television series within the Star Trek franchise. The collaboration was branded as "the first Intergalactic Friendship Day".

=== Broadcast ===
The series was preceded by three specials which aired during November and December 2023, marking Davies' return and the show's 60th anniversary, as well as the first episodes to be released internationally on Disney+. The 2023 Christmas special, "The Church on Ruby Road", aired on 25 December, serving as Gatwa and Gibson's first full episode.

The fourteenth series premiered on 11 May 2024, with a double-bill release of the first two episodes at midnight BST on BBC iPlayer and Disney+, before both were aired consecutively on BBC One later that day. Subsequent episodes followed the same release pattern. The two-part finale, "The Legend of Ruby Sunday" / "Empire of Death", were screened together in UK cinemas on 21 June, with the latter episode aligning with its midnight release on 22 June.

On 20 June 2024, a new episode of Tales of the TARDIS was broadcast on BBC Four featuring the first appearance of Sutekh in Pyramids of Mars (1975) and bookended with new scenes of Gatwa and Gibson.

=== Aftershow ===
The series was accompanied by Doctor Who: Unleashed, a behind-the-scenes companion show. Adopting a similar format to the former behind-the-scenes programme Doctor Who Confidential, Unleashed follows every new episode of Doctor Who with a 30-minute instalment on BBC Three, hosted by Steffan Powell. The show was announced on 27 September 2023, after accurate reports of the show surfaced the previous year. An additional episode of Unleashed followed the series finale and featured previously unseen clips from across the series.

=== Home media ===
The series were released on both DVD and Blu-ray on 12 August 2024, under the title of "Season 1". It was made available for pre-order in May of the same year.

| Series | Story no. | Episode name | Duration | Release date | | |
| Series | Story no. | Episode name | Duration | R2 | R4 | R1 |
|---|---|---|---|---|---|---|
| 14 | 304 | Doctor Who: "The Church on Ruby Road" | 1 × 55 min. | 12 February 2024^{(D,B)} | —N/a | —N/a |
| 14 | 304–311 | Doctor Who: Season One (includes "The Church on Ruby Road") | 2 × 55 min. 7 × 45 min. | 12 August 2024^{(D,B)} | 13 August 2025^{(D,B)} | 24 June 2025^{(D,B)} |

=== In print ===
Three episodes from the series were novelised as part of the Target Collection, along with a paperback re-release of the 2023 Christmas special. They were released on 8 August 2024.

| Series | Story no. | Novelisation title | Author | Hardcover release date (Note: Published by BBC Books unless otherwise indicated) | Paperback release date (Note: Published by BBC Books under the Target Collection umbrella unless otherwise indicated) | Audiobook | |
| Series | Story no. | Novelisation title | Author | Hardcover release date | Paperback release date | Release date (Note: Unabridged from BBC Audio / AudioGo unless otherwise indicated) | Narrator |
|---|---|---|---|---|---|---|---|
| 14 | 304 | The Church on Ruby Road | Esmie Jikiemi-Pearson | 25 January 2024 | 8 August 2024 | 25 January 2024 | Angela Wynter |
| 14 | 305 | Space Babies | Alison Rumfitt | —N/a | 8 August 2024 | | Clare Corbett |
| 14 | 308 | 73 Yards | Scott Handcock | —N/a | 8 August 2024 | | Susan Twist |
| 14 | 310 | Rogue | Kate Herron and Briony Redman | —N/a | 8 August 2024 | | Dan Starkey |
| 14 | 311 | Empire of Death (Note: Also adapts "The Legend of Ruby Sunday") | Scott Handcock | —N/a | 10 July 2025 | | Susan Twist |

== Reception ==
=== Critical response ===
Doctor Who series 14: Critical reception by episode
Series 14 (2024): Percentage of positive critics' reviews tracked by the website Rotten Tomatoes

On the review aggregator website Rotten Tomatoes, 93% of 189 critics' reviews are positive, with an average rating of 6.9/10. The website's consensus reads: "Ncuti Gatwa's dashing interpretation of The Doctor brings a breath of fresh air aboard the TARDIS, piloting this perennial sci-fi series into an exciting new era." Metacritic, which uses a weighted average, assigned the series a score of 72 out of 100, based on 18 critics, indicating "generally favorable" reviews. "Boom" and "Rogue" were considered by critics to be the best episodes of the series while "Space Babies" and "Empire of Death" were thought to be the worst.

IGN writer Carlos Morales felt the series to be a significant improvement when compared to those under Chibnall. Despite this, he still found flaws in Davies' writing and the characterisation of Gatwa but still praised his and Gibson's performances. Writing for The New York Times, Maya Phillips also praised Gatwa's performance across the entire series as well as the increased diversity. Phillips went on to write that the series had a significant tonal shift from previous series, stating "Disney may be in the early phases of transforming the BBC show much as it has done with other I.P., like Star Wars, which grew into an ever-expanding franchise at the expense of the original product." Many critics and viewers criticised the resolution of the series overall story arc, feeling that revealing Ruby's mother to be a regular person was unsatisfactory and underwhelming following the build up in earlier episodes.

=== Ratings ===
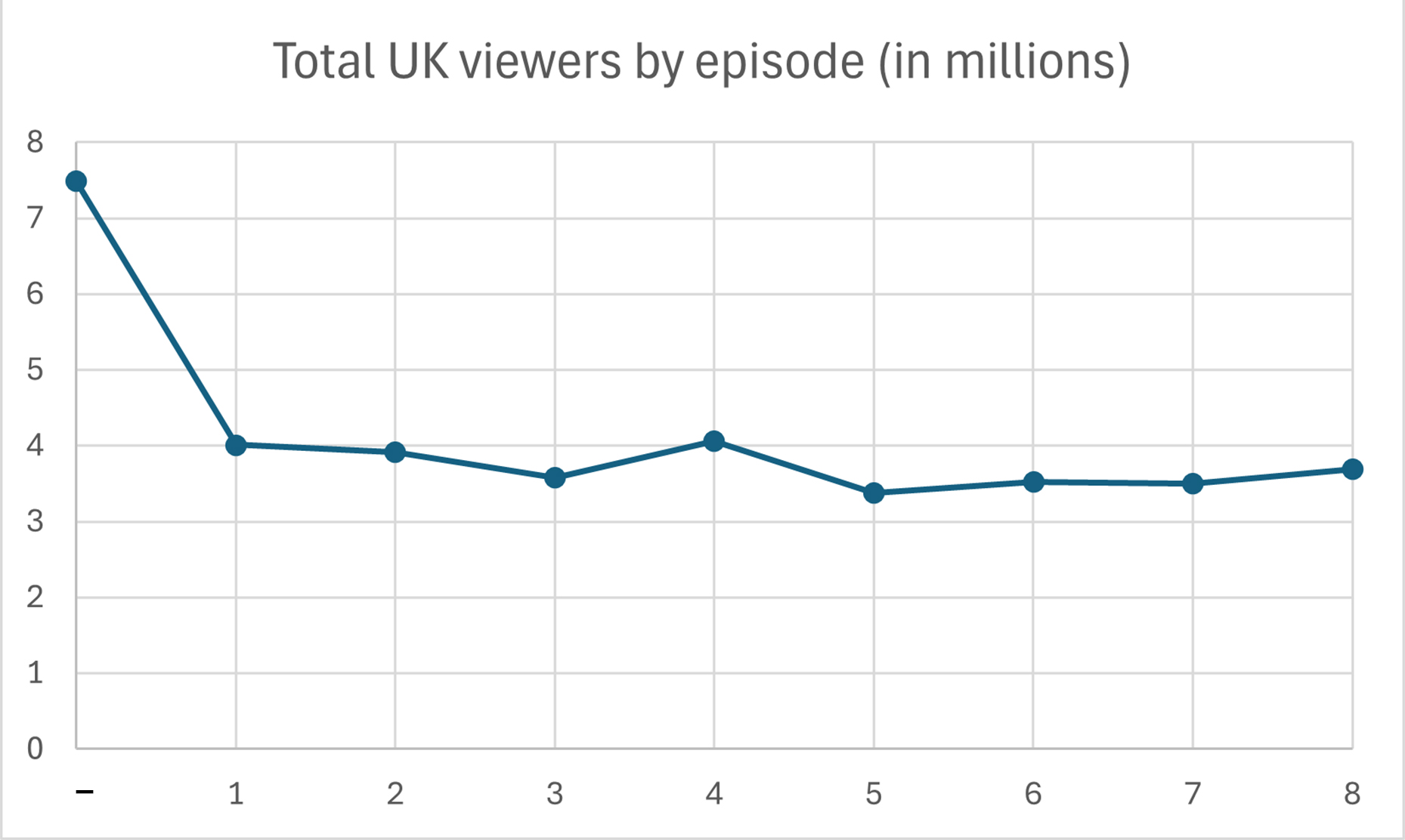
Viewership data for Doctor Who series 14

Overnight ratings for the fourteenth series were noticeably lower than previous Doctor Who series as well as the 2022–2023 specials. "The Church on Ruby Road", Gatwa's first full episode as the Doctor, lost over two million viewers compared that of his predecessor, David Tennant, in "The Star Beast" (2023). Additionally, his first series opener, "Space Babies", received over five million fewer viewers than Jodie Whittaker's regular-series debut in "The Woman Who Fell to Earth" (2018). The decline in viewing figures were assumed to be largely caused by the advance release of episodes on BBC iPlayer. Overnight ratings for the fourteenth series, bar the preceding Christmas special, only included the Saturday night broadcast airing of each episode on BBC One, and not the iPlayer ratings of the initial midnight release. Various other reasons have been put forward for the slump: changes in viewing habits, the time of year the series was aired, and audience discomfort with the gay and transgender elements of the series. The BBC stated that "overnight ratings no longer provide an accurate picture of all those who watch drama in an on-demand world."

In consolidated data, the series remained consistent with the thirteenth series broadcast three years earlier. It also maintained a similar share to episodes during the Matt Smith and Peter Capaldi era, which is higher than the average share of Whitaker's era. Ahead of the two-part finale, Davies admitted that the ratings were not as high as the producers had expected them to be but noted that viewing figures were growing in 28-day data. As of 21 June "Space Babies" had been viewed by 5.9 million while "The Devil's Chord" was seen by a total of 5.7 million; both of which exceeded the 2022 special episode, "The Power of the Doctor". Davies also said their ultimate goal was to bring a younger audience to the programme and that the series was specifically excelling in the 16–34 and under-16 age demographics. The series was consistently the highest-rated programme in viewers under age 30. Despite the lower ratings, Davies remained hopeful that the programme would be commissioned for a sixteenth series. It was also reported that the BBC was waiting on a potential extension of the co-production deal with Disney to finalise before officially commissioning it.

The cinema showing of the finale episode grossed £364,253 at the box office. It ranked as the fourth most-profitable showing at UK cinemas for the weekend it was screened. In the United States, Doctor Who was the United Kingdom's highest demanded programme. It also topped out at seventh on a list of Disney's most demanded series. Each episode of the series was within the top five titles on the streamer for the week in which it released. However, taking the advanced marketing campaign and budgetary increase into account, its performance in the U.S. was still described as "underwhelming" and a Disney employee referred to it as "okay but not stellar". A Disney executive later stated that they were "really, really happy to have" Doctor Who and that it "feels like a really good fit".

| No. | Title | Air date | Overnight ratings | Consolidated ratings | | Total viewers (millions) | 28-day viewers (millions) | AI | Ref(s) |
| No. | Title | Air date | Viewers (millions) | Viewers (millions) | Rank | Total viewers (millions) | 28-day viewers (millions) | AI | Ref(s) |
|---|---|---|---|---|---|---|---|---|---|
| – | "The Church on Ruby Road" | 25 December 2023 | 4.73 (Note: Ranked third) | 2.76 | 4 | 7.49 | —N/a | 82 | |
| 1 | "Space Babies" | 11 May 2024 | 2.60 | 2.02 | 10 | 4.62 | 5.70 | 75 | |
| 2 | "The Devil's Chord" | 11 May 2024 | 2.42 | 1.82 | 12 | 4.24 | 5.56 | 77 | |
| 3 | "Boom" | 18 May 2024 | 2.04 | 1.59 | 18 | 3.63 | 4.69 | 78 | |
| 4 | "73 Yards" | 25 May 2024 | 2.62 | 1.64 | 12 | 4.26 | 5.23 | 77 | |
| 5 | "Dot and Bubble" | 1 June 2024 | 2.12 (Note: Ranked first) | 1.5 | 24 | 3.62 | 4.43 | 77 | |
| 6 | "Rogue" | 8 June 2024 | 2.11 | 1.55 | 14 | 3.66 | 4.34 | 77 | |
| 7 | "The Legend of Ruby Sunday" | 15 June 2024 | 2.02 | 1.77 | 19 | 3.79 | 4.52 | 81 | |
| 8 | "Empire of Death" | 22 June 2024 | 2.25 | 1.69 | 18 | 3.94 | 4.40 | 80 | |

== Soundtrack ==
In June 2025, composer Murray Gold commented on the release of the related soundtrack, and that there would likely be "one big music dump" for the soundtracks of the tenth series, 2023 specials, fourteenth series and fifteenth series. In February 2026, Gold appeared on "The Whoniverse Show" to discuss the soundtracks for the 2023 specials and following two series, stating that the release window would "be 2026 I think. Hopefully all three."
