= 73 Yards =

308 – "73 Yards"
- Doctor Who episode
- Promotional title-card

Cast
- Doctor: Ncuti Gatwa – Fifteenth Doctor
- Companion: Millie Gibson – Ruby Sunday
- Others: Hilary Hobson – The Woman; Susan Twist – Hiker; Maxine Evans – Lowri Palin; Siân Phillips – Enid Meadows; Sion Pritchard – Joshua Steele; Gwion Morris Jones – Ifor Jones; Elan Davies – Thin Lucy; Glyn Pritchard – Eddie Jones; Michelle Greenidge – Carla Sunday; Angela Wynter – Cherry Sunday; Anita Dobson – Mrs Flood; Jemma Redgrave – Kate Lethbridge-Stewart; Graham Butler – Frank Hinchey; Ali Ariaie – Sanjay Miah; Albey Brookes – Rufus Bray; Aneurin Barnard – Roger ap Gwilliam; Miles Yekinni – Craig Deloach; Amol Rajan – Himself; Sophie Ablett – Marti Bridges; Shane David-Joseph – Akhim Patil; Jason May – Groundsman; Dylan Baldwin – Security Officer; David Constant – Armed Policeman; Deeviya Meir – Newsreader; Amanda Walker – Old Ruby; Rhyanna Alexander-Davis – Elizabeth Campbell; Vee Vimolmal – Nurse

Production
- Directed by: Dylan Holmes Williams
- Written by: Russell T Davies
- Produced by: Vicki Delow
- Executive producers: Russell T Davies; Julie Gardner; Jane Tranter; Joel Collins; Phil Collinson
- Music by: Murray Gold
- Series: Series 14
- Running time: 47 minutes
- First broadcast: 25 May 2024

Chronology
← Preceded by "Boom"	Followed by → "Dot and Bubble"

"73 Yards" is the fourth episode of the fourteenth series of the science fiction television series Doctor Who. The episode was first released in the United Kingdom on BBC iPlayer on 25 May 2024 and was broadcast on BBC One the same night. It was released simultaneously on Disney+ in the United States on 24 May. The episode was written by Russell T Davies and directed by Dylan Holmes Williams.

In the episode, the Fifteenth Doctor (Ncuti Gatwa) suddenly vanishes from a clifftop in Wales after breaking a fairy circle. His companion Ruby Sunday (Millie Gibson), searches for him whilst being followed by a mysterious woman who is always 73 yards away from her. Described by Davies as folk horror, "73 Yards" was the first episode of the fourteenth series to be filmed, with shooting taking place in various locations around Wales in late 2022 and early 2023.

"73 Yards" was watched by 4.26 million viewers and received positive reviews from critics, with Gibson's performance being widely praised. The episode was nominated for a Hugo Award for Best Dramatic Presentation.

== Plot ==
A short clip from the episode featuring Ruby Sunday in a pub.

The Doctor and Ruby arrive on a clifftop in Wales. The Doctor accidentally steps on a "fairy circle" with two scrolls inside it. Ruby finds a message written on the scrolls which read, "Miss you" and "Rest in Peace, Mad Jack". Thereafter, the Doctor vanishes. A mysterious woman appears 73 yards (67 m) away from Ruby and remains at exactly that distance no matter where she goes. Every person who talks to the woman flees in terror and becomes hostile to Ruby.

Ruby returns home and asks her mother, Carla, for help. Carla talks to the woman, but also flees, and disowns Ruby. A year later, Ruby has a meeting with Kate Lethbridge-Stewart of UNIT, who tells her the Doctor was never seen again after disappearing in Wales. Kate also comments on the increase of supernatural activity recently tracked by UNIT. She speculates the TARDIS's perception filter on the fairy circle may have created the phenomenon. Several UNIT soldiers attempt to capture the woman, but when they get close to her, she speaks to them. Kate immediately cancels the operation, abandoning Ruby. Ruby then spends the next twenty years alone.

While on a date, Ruby sees an advertisement for Roger ap Gwilliam, a candidate for prime minister. Ruby recalls that the Doctor said Gwilliam would bring Britain to the brink of nuclear war after he is elected. She sees that his nickname is "Mad Jack," and connects him to the fairy circle. Ruby joins Gwilliam's campaign team to stop him. Gwilliam wins the election, and plans to make a public address where he will announce that Britain is leaving NATO and buying Pakistan's nuclear arsenal. Ruby stands 73 yards from Gwilliam, causing him to encounter the woman. After speaking to her, he flees in terror and immediately resigns.

The woman does not leave, and Ruby spends another forty years alone. An elderly Ruby lies in a hospital bed and watches as the woman slowly approaches her. The woman reaches her just as Ruby's heart monitor stops. Ruby then appears in the past, on the day she and the Doctor interacted with the circle. She views them from the woman's position, whom the younger Ruby now notices earlier, and warns her younger self. Ruby prevents the Doctor from stepping on the fairy circle before the pair leave.

== Production ==
=== Development ===
"73 Yards" was written by Russell T Davies, who described the episode as being "Welsh folk horror" and the antagonist to be the "strangest villain you'll ever see." He further explained that the episode showed Ruby living "a life of penitence", required to do "something good" to earn forgiveness for the Doctor's unintentional "lack of respect" in breaking the fairy circle. Davies considered it to be "one of the greatest things I've ever made in my life". Gatwa stated that "73 Yards" was important to Ruby's overall development throughout the series.

The episode omitted Doctor Who's opening theme song and title sequence. It is one of the few episodes in the programme's history to do so, the others being "Sleep No More" (2015), "The Woman Who Fell to Earth" (2018) and "Resolution" (2019).

=== Filming ===
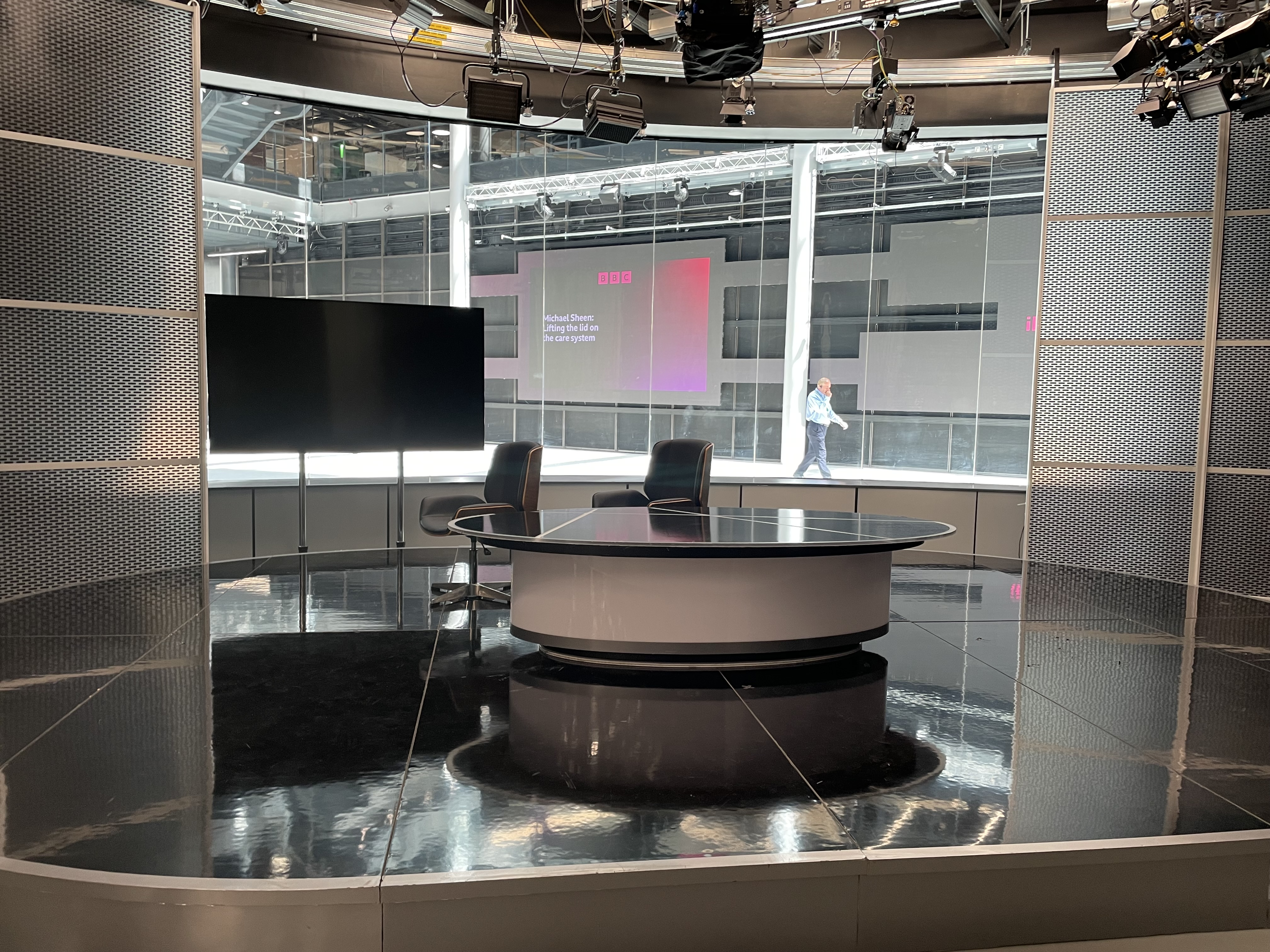
The studio at BBC Cymru Wales New Broadcasting House was used as a filming location.

"73 Yards" was filmed in December 2022 and January 2023 and directed by Dylan Holmes Williams. It was the first episode of the fourteenth series to be filmed, in the first production block along with the following episode, "Dot and Bubble". It was the first script given to Gibson. The first scenes filmed by Gibson took place in Ruby's flat. The opening scene was filmed in the West Wales town of Tenby. Two TARDIS props were used during filming because the production team needed it to appear aged and would not have had time to re-paint it on location.

Filming for pub scenes took place at the White Cross Inn in Groeswen, Caerphilly, which had also previously been used as a filming location in the spin-off series Torchwood. Since the window Ruby looks out of in the pub actually overlooked a car park, the window had to be recreated in another place to achieve the required point of view. Some scenes were filmed at BBC Cymru Wales New Broadcasting House and Cardiff City Stadium.

=== Casting ===
"73 Yards" stars Gibson as Ruby Sunday and is deemed as a "Doctor-lite" episode which refers to an episode that features limited screen time for the Doctor. Gatwa was still filming Sex Education (2019–2023) at the time the episode was filmed, limiting his availability. He was only on location for one day of filming to shoot his scenes. Davies later revealed in Doctor Who Magazine that a Doctor-lite episode would not have happened during the series if Gatwa had been available sooner.

Casting for the episode was announced on 9 January 2023. Aneurin Barnard appears in the episode as the antagonistic Prime Minister Roger ap Gwilliam. Hilary Hobson portrays the Woman, while Siân Phillips portrays Enid Meadows. Amanda Walker portrayed an older version of Ruby.

"73 Yards" features multiple returning characters including Jemma Redgrave as Kate Lethbridge-Stewart, the head of UNIT who last appeared in "The Giggle" (2023), and Anita Dobson who reprised her role as Mrs Flood in a brief appearance. Amol Rajan makes a cameo appearance as himself. Real broadcast journalists were used as extras in the scenes filmed at BBC's Broadcasting House. As in previous episodes of the series, Susan Twist appears in a different role, this time at the beginning of the episode as a hiker.

== Broadcast and reception ==
Professional ratings
Aggregate scores
Source	Rating
Rotten Tomatoes (Tomatometer)	100%
Rotten Tomatoes (Average Rating)	8.6/10
Review scores
Source	Rating
Digital Spy	4/5 stars
Empire	4/5 stars
Evening Standard	5/5 stars
i	5/5 stars
IGN	8/10
Radio Times	4/5 stars
The Independent	5/5 stars
Total Film	5/5 stars
Vulture	3/5 stars

=== Broadcast ===
In the United Kingdom, "73 Yards" was first released on BBC iPlayer and aired on BBC One on 25 May 2024. It was released simultaneously on Disney+ in the United States on 24 May. Disney also handled international distribution of the episode outside of the United Kingdom and Ireland.

=== Ratings ===
Overnight figures estimated that the episode was seen by 2.62 million viewers upon its first broadcast, the largest overnight figures of the series up to that point. It beat the previous highest "Space Babies" by around 20 thousand viewers, and was up 580 thousand viewers from the previous episode. The episode received a total of 4.26 million consolidated viewers across 7 days, and a total of 5.23 million consolidated viewers across 28 days.

=== Critical reception ===
On the review aggregator website Rotten Tomatoes, 100% of 16 critics' reviews are positive, with an average rating of 8.6/10. The website's consensus reads: "A discombobulating and eerie installment that puts Millie Gibson's Ruby front and center, '73 Yards' is maybe the best entry in this season yet."

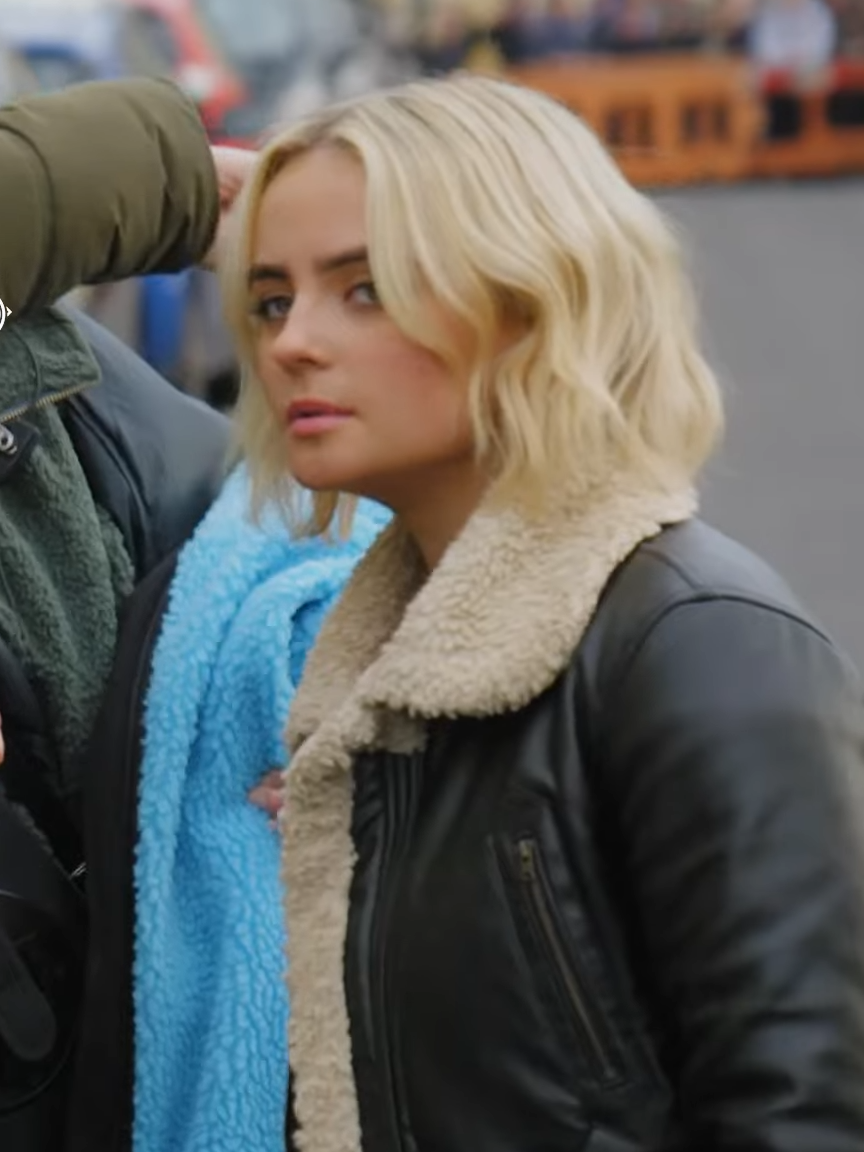
Gibson's performance was widely praised by critics. (Note: Attributed to multiple sources:)

In his review for VG247, Alex Donaldson referred to "73 Yards" as "more than just an all-time great Doctor Who episode, it's one of the best bits of TV in years". Similarly, Evening Standard's Martin Robinson hailed it as "a sci-fi horror classic that even the show's haters will love" and saw it as a rival to "Blink" (2007), citing its "formal excellence and truly affecting horror". Daniel Cooper of Engadget praised the episode for its exploration of Ruby's character and how it utilised her.

Bradley Russell of Total Film described the episode as an "outstanding Who entry" that is "unsettling" and that would "stay with you long after the iconic credits music kicks in", but argued that the third act was weaker than the rest of the episode as it loses the impact of horror and forward momentum from the Welsh setting. IGN's Robert Anderson praised the atmosphere of the episode, considering it "among the best 'Doctor-lite' episodes ever", despite commenting that some plot threads do not resolve in a satisfactory manner. Louise Griffin of Radio Times opined that the "unanswered questions" contributed "to the riddle of the story" and the execution was good, adding that she believed there was a limit for audiences, but the episode did not cross it. Digital Spy's Rebecca Cook thought the episode was "frustratingly close to being faultless", criticising the Gwilliam plot as well as its execution in conjunction with the rest of the episode. Cook compared it to the series four episode "Turn Left" (2008), and praised the decision to exclude the Doctor saying it gave Gibson room to breathe. She also praised the directing of Dylan Holmes Williams. Jennifer Zhan of Vulture gave a more mixed review, giving the episode three out of five, feeling that various questions were left unanswered, and even calls Ruby not initially helping Marti to be contrasting with her established character. Adi Tantimedh from Bleeding Cool gave the episode a 10/10, saying that it "perfectly encapsulates the absurdity and horror of the modern world through the lens of a multi-colored puppet nightmare of epic proportions". Julie River of Out Front praised Gibson's performance, but criticised the "frustrating" mystery and the unanswered questions.

== In print ==
73 Yards
- Author: Scott Handcock
- Series: Doctor Who book: Target novelisations
- Publisher: BBC Books
- Publication date: 8 August 2024
- Pages: 192
- ISBN: 9781785948862

A novelisation of the episode was written by Scott Handcock and made available for pre-order in May 2024. It was released as a paperback and an audiobook on 8 August 2024 as part of the Target Collection, the second anniversary of Davies deciding on the distance of 73 yards. The audiobook is set to be read by Susan Twist.
