= Rogue (Doctor Who) =

310 – "Rogue"
- Doctor Who episode
- Promotional title-card

Cast
- Doctor: Ncuti Gatwa – Fifteenth Doctor
- Companion: Millie Gibson – Ruby Sunday
- Others: Paul Forman – Lord Barton; Maxim Ays – Lord Galpin; Indira Varma – Duchess of Pemberton; Jonathan Groff – Rogue; Camilla Aiko – Emily Beckett; Debra Baker – Housekeeper; Ashley Campbell – Butler; Nancy Brabin-Platt – Miss Talbot; Michelle Greenidge – Carla Sunday; David Charles – Mr Price; Susan Twist – Portrait (uncredited); Richard E. Grant – Unknown Doctor (uncredited)

Production
- Directed by: Ben Chessell
- Written by: Kate Herron and Briony Redman
- Produced by: Chris May
- Executive producers: Russell T Davies; Julie Gardner; Jane Tranter; Joel Collins; Phil Collinson
- Music by: Murray Gold
- Series: Series 14
- Running time: 44 minutes
- First broadcast: 8 June 2024

Chronology
← Preceded by "Dot and Bubble"	Followed by → "The Legend of Ruby Sunday"

"Rogue" is the sixth episode of the fourteenth series of the British science fiction television series Doctor Who. The episode was first released in the United Kingdom on BBC iPlayer on 8 June 2024 and was broadcast on BBC One the same night. It was released simultaneously on Disney+ in the United States on 7 June. The episode was written by Kate Herron and Briony Redman, and directed by Ben Chessell.

In the episode, the Fifteenth Doctor (Ncuti Gatwa) and his companion, Ruby Sunday (Millie Gibson) travel to 1813 where they meet a mysterious bounty hunter named Rogue (Jonathan Groff), who is trying to hunt and kill a criminal member of the shape-shifting Chuldur species.

"Rogue" was filmed in Wales in May 2023 and shared similar themes to the period drama Bridgerton in terms of production design, costumes, music, and choreography. The episode is dedicated to former Doctor Who star William Russell, who died in the week prior to its first broadcast. It received a positive reception from critics, with praise towards Gatwa and Groff's performances, and was watched by 3.66 million viewers.

== Plot ==
Teaser trailer for "Rogue"

In 1813, the Doctor and Ruby visit Bath, England to attend a ball. The Doctor encounters a mysterious bounty hunter named Rogue, and the pair go outside to talk to each other. Meanwhile, Ruby finds a woman named Emily, and accidentally interrupts a proposal of marriage between her and another man, who rejects her. Ruby comforts Emily, while the Doctor and Rogue discover the dead body of the Duchess. Rogue captures the Doctor and traps him in a sealing device on his ship.

Rogue scans the Doctor, believing him to be a Chuldur (because the scan says the Doctor is a shapeshifter), a member of a race of shape-shifting avian humanoids. Rogue threatens to send the Doctor to an incinerator, but the Doctor convinces Rogue to spare him by showing him his Time Lord biology and past incarnations. The Doctor reconfigures Rogue's sealing device to send the Chuldur to an alternate dimension so that Rogue will not kill it, while also offering Rogue the opportunity to travel with him.

Ruby and Emily discover the dead body of a housekeeper and meet up with the Doctor and Rogue. The Doctor deduces that, like Ruby, the Chuldur are fans of Bridgerton and can be lured away by scandal. The Doctor accordingly asks Rogue to dance and stages an argument with him, with Rogue professing love and offering a ring. The pair storm off as part of the act, causing the Duchess to follow. The Doctor and Rogue realize there are actually four Chuldur and not just one, and flee from them. They reconfigure Rogue's sealing device to account for more Chuldur. Emily reveals herself to be a Chuldur and apparently kills and shapeshifts into Ruby.

The Doctor interrupts the Chuldur's mock wedding and uses the sealing device on them. Ruby reveals she was able to escape Emily, but is unable to escape the seal. Rogue arrives and knocks Emily into the seal. Rogue kisses the Doctor, but also steals the device used to activate the seal from him while doing so. Rogue jumps into the seal and throws Ruby out. Rogue asks the Doctor to find him as he and the Chuldur are sent to an unknown alternate dimension.

The Doctor sends Rogue's ship into an orbit around the Moon and tells Ruby that he may not be able to find Rogue due to the infinite number of alternate dimensions. He puts on Rogue's ring before departing.

== Production ==
=== Development ===
The episode takes place in Bath, Somerset, and is set in 1813 during the Regency era. The episode has been compared to Bridgerton and Pride and Prejudice, the former of which is directly referred to in dialogue. Russell T Davies, the Doctor Who showrunner, stated that he and Bridgerton's executive producer Shonda Rhimes are fans of each other. He further explained that there was an episode of Grey's Anatomy (a television series created by Rhimes) where Doctor Who fans fight over his autograph in an emergency room. Davies said that he viewed the Bridgerton-themed episode as "repaying the compliment". Phil Collinson, an executive producer on the programme, hired Jack Murphy as the episodes choreographer after finding out he worked on Bridgerton. The British broadcast of the episode was dedicated to William Russell, who portrayed Ian Chesterton, one of Doctor Who's original companions, following his death five days earlier.

"Rogue" is co-written by first-time writers for the show, Kate Herron and Briony Redman. Herron had previously directed and produced the first season of Loki, which included the title character briefly mentioning his bisexuality. In 2021, Davies criticised this in the media as a "feeble gesture" to feature queer representation, but later contacted Herron to apologise. This contact led to a friendship between the pair, and Davies later asked if she would like to write an episode of Doctor Who. Herron introduced Davies to her writing partner Redman, who had previously collaborated with Herron on a range of projects.

=== Costumes ===
Costume designer Pam Downe had recently worked on a regency-era film and aimed to dress the cast in a wider variety of colours than would be typical of the period. She took a mix of inspiration from her own paintings, Bridgerton, and more modern outfits. In the episode, Gatwa wears white trousers with a velvet jacket. Downe viewed Gatwa's jacket as an acknowledgement to the outfits of the previous Doctors, particularly that of Jon Pertwee's Third Doctor. Groff's outfit included a navy blue tailcoat.

=== Filming ===
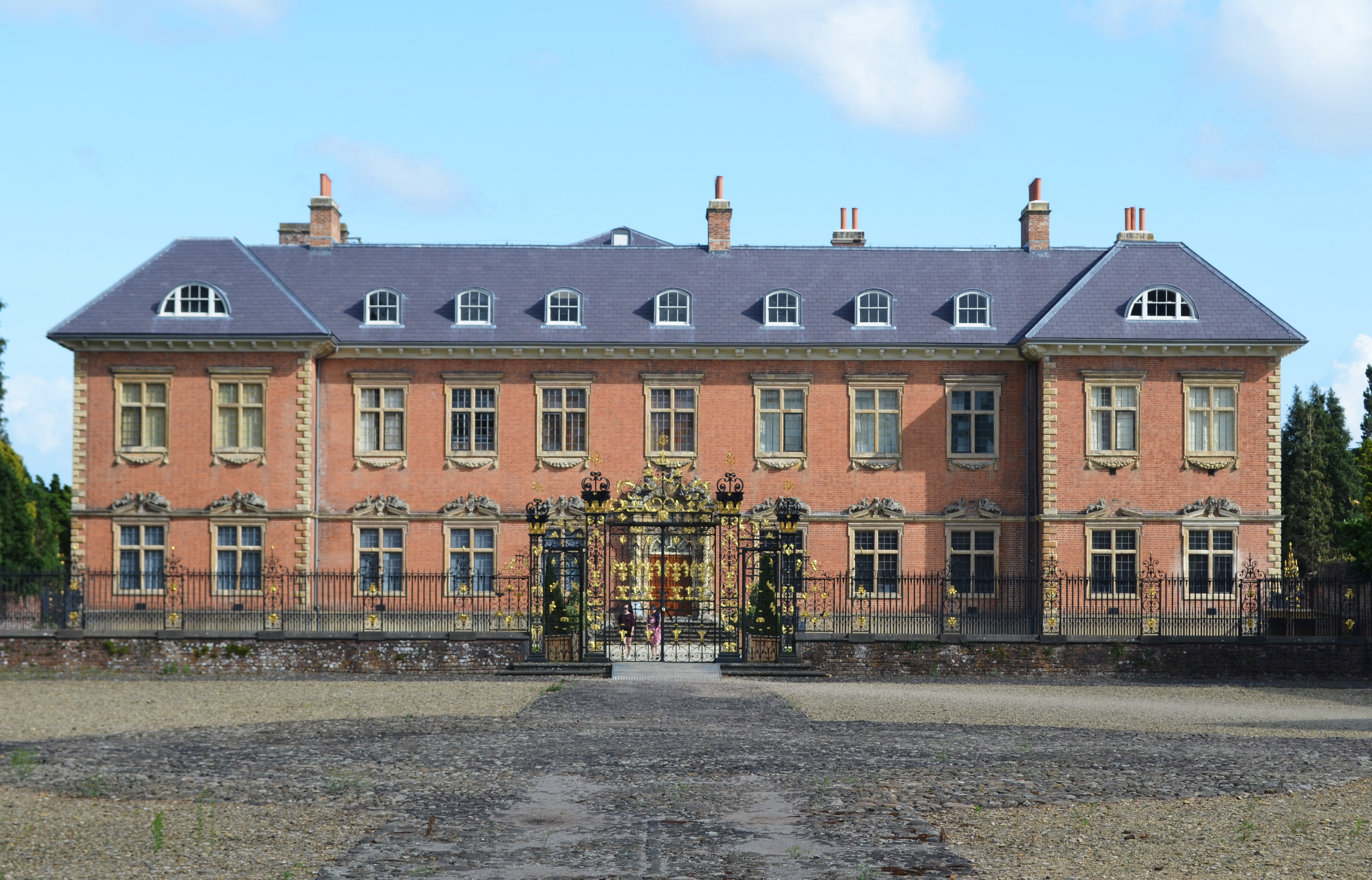
Tredegar House

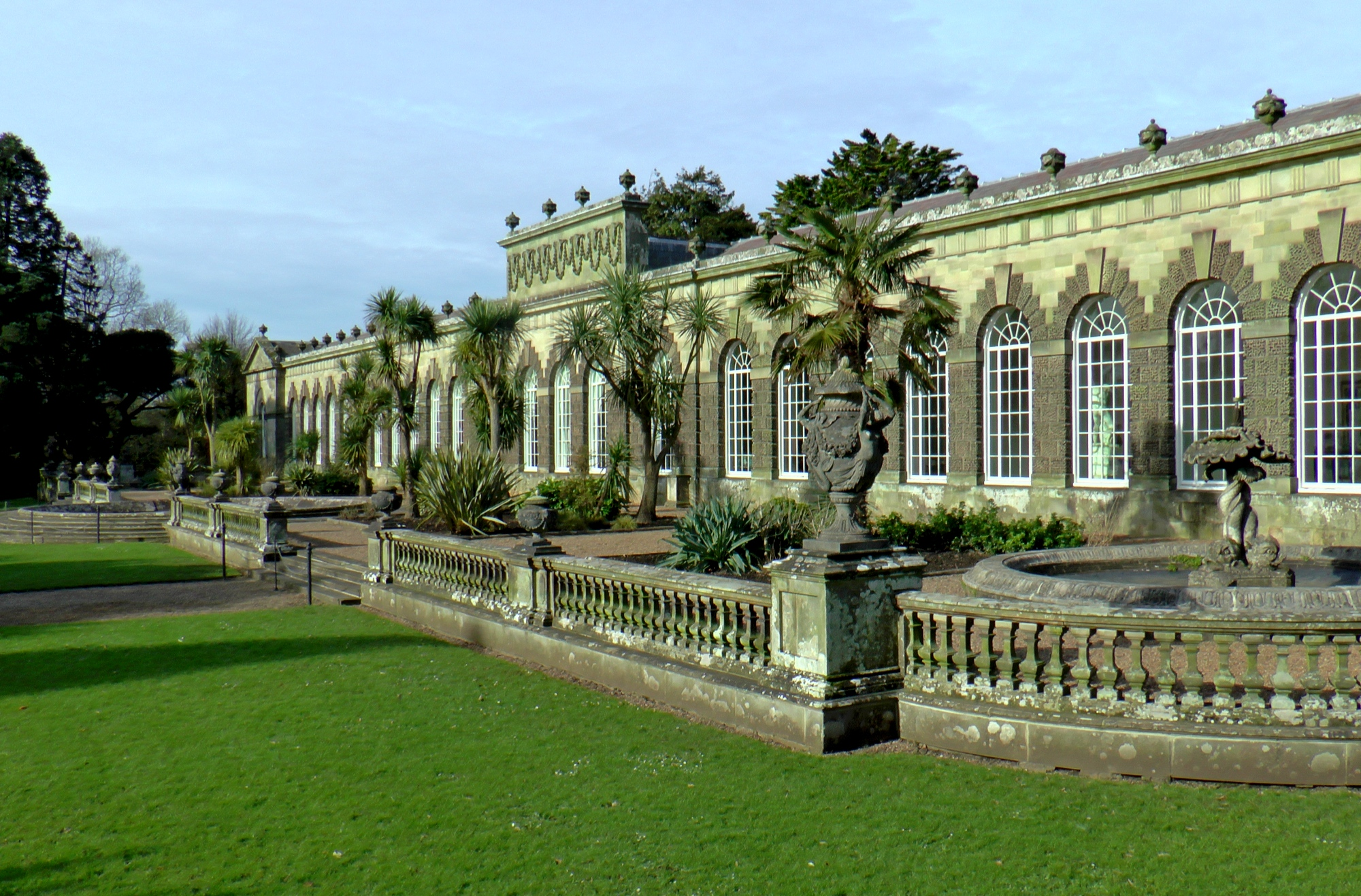
Margam Park Orangery

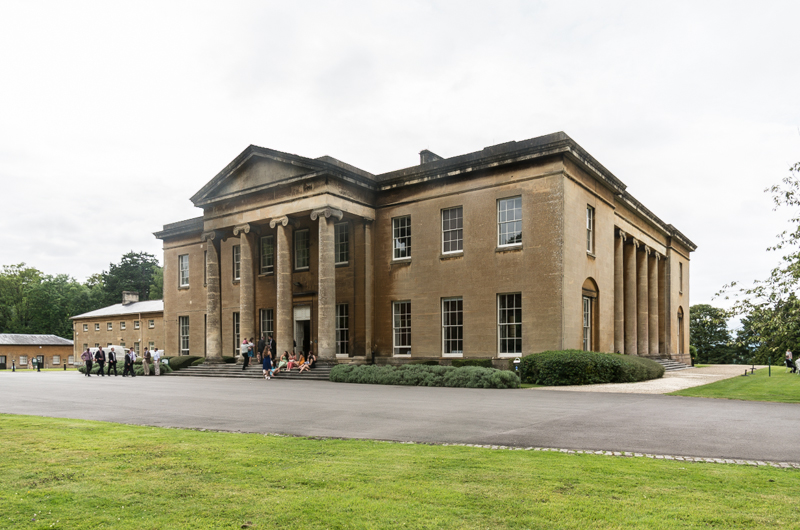
Leigh Court

Filming locations for the episode.

"Rogue" was directed by Ben Chessell, and filmed in April and May 2023. It was produced in the fourth filming block of the fourteenth series along with the second episode, "The Devil's Chord." Locations included Tredegar House in Newport, Wales, the Margam Country Park Orangery, and Leigh Court near Bristol. 80% of Rogue's spaceship was recycled from previous sets including "Wild Blue Yonder" (2023) and "Space Babies" (2024). Only one final take could be used for the tango dance between the Doctor and Rogue because eye contact had to be maintained the entire time, limiting the number of takes that could be edited together.

=== Casting ===
In May 2023 it was announced that Jonathan Groff had joined Doctor Who in an unnamed guest role. It was speculated that Groff would replace John Barrowman as Captain Jack Harkness. Groff's role was later revealed to be the episode's titular character, a bounty hunter named Rogue, though some critics did note the similarities between Rogue and Harkness. Groff said that he had never seen Doctor Who before and was sent five episodes by Davies, including An Unearthly Child (1963), before filming began. During production of this episode, Groff filmed a short cameo that would be used in the 2025 episode Wish World.

That same month Indira Varma joined the cast to play a character named the Duchess. Varma had previously played Suzie Costello in the Doctor Who spin-off series, Torchwood. Paul Forman guest starred as Lord Barton. The likeness of actor Susan Twist appears in a portrait, continuing the pattern of her appearing throughout series 14 as seemingly disparate characters. The remainder of the guest cast included Michelle Greenidge appearing as Ruby's mother Carla and Ashley Campbell as a butler.

The episode includes a montage of the Doctor's previous incarnations. Among the images is the likeness of Richard E. Grant who previously played a spoof version of the Doctor in the Red Nose Day special The Curse of Fatal Death (1999) and voiced an alternate Ninth Doctor in the animated serial Scream of the Shalka (2003). Grant previously appeared in the live action series as the Great Intelligence (2012–13). Grant participated in a photoshoot to capture the images necessary for this appearance; Davies described Grant as "so up for it", and described the inclusion of an additional Doctor as "enormous fun" and "a joke". Davies also viewed Grant's inclusion as a kindness to Paul Cornell, who wrote Scream of the Shalka, after Davies "replaced" Cornell's Doctor with Christopher Eccleston's Ninth Doctor, attributing his ability to do this to the revelations around the Doctor's origins as the "Timeless Child" during the Thirteenth Doctor's era.

=== Music ===
The episode featured orchestral covers of contemporary popular music, a theme also used by Bridgerton, including "Bad Guy" (2019) by Billie Eilish, and "Poker Face" (2008) by Lady Gaga. These covers were performed by the Vitamin String Quartet. The Doctor sings "Pure Imagination" from Willy Wonka & the Chocolate Factory (1971), and the original recording of "Can't Get You Out of My Head" (2001) by Kylie Minogue is included in the episode. An orchestral arrangement of Astor Piazzolla's "Libertango" (1974) is featured as the Doctor and Rogue dance. An arrangement of Mozart's "Eine kleine Nachtmusik" (1787) is included.

== Reception ==
Professional ratings
Aggregate scores
Source	Rating
Rotten Tomatoes (Tomatometer)	100%
Rotten Tomatoes (Average Rating)	8.3/10
Review scores
Source	Rating
Digital Spy	4/5 stars
Radio Times	3/5 stars
Total Film	4/5 stars
IGN	8/10

=== Broadcast ===
In the United Kingdom, "Rogue" was first released on BBC iPlayer and aired on BBC One on 8 June 2024. It was released simultaneously on Disney+ in the United States on 7 June. Disney also handled international distribution of the episode outside of the United Kingdom and Ireland.

=== Ratings ===
"Rogue" brought in overnight viewing figures of 2.11 million, slightly down from the 2.12m who watched the previous episode, "Dot and Bubble". The episode received a total of 3.66 million consolidated viewers across 7 days, and a total of 4.34 million consolidated viewers across 28 days.

=== Critical response ===
On the review aggregator website Rotten Tomatoes, 100% of 10 critics' reviews are positive, with an average rating of 8.3/10. The website's consensus reads: "An affectionate riff on a certain regency drama, 'Rogue' has a ball with its costumed hijinks." Gatwa and Groff's performances were widely praised by critics.

VG247's Jim Trinca responded positively to the episode, praising the script as well as the episode's overall similarities to past episodes of the show, such as those in the second series of the show. Robert Anderson of IGN also gave a positive review, enjoying the usage of the Doctor's character, Groff's performance, and the Chuldur as antagonists, but criticised the episode leaning heavily on references to Bridgerton. Louise Griffin of Radio Times stated that while the episode "isn't a classic for the ages", she found it to be a fun tonal change from prior episodes in the season. She criticised the Chuldur as antagonists and the references to Bridgerton.

Rebecca Cook of Digital Spy found the chemistry between Gatwa and Groff to be well done, while also commending the performance of Varma. Stefan Mohamed of Den of Geek found the writing to be sharp, replete with fun scenes and clever twists, and described the costumes as "sensational". He found the performances "on point", particularly Jonathan Groff, and also praised the chemistry and romance between Gatwa and Groff as the Doctor and Rogue, but criticised the ending, feeling that the Chuldur's sudden shift to a world ending threat was rushed. Emily Murray of Total Film also found Groff to be the star of the episode, praising the "electric chemistry" between Groff and Gatwa and the unique "tenderness" to this brought to the Doctor. However, Murray criticised the lack of involvement and interaction with Ruby's character as well as what she felt was a "sidelined" plot involving the Chuldur.

Conversely, some critics felt that Rogue was too similar to Jack Harkness, and felt that Rogue's and the Doctor's romance was rushed, and panned how the Doctor "never confronts the Chulder about what they’re doing, never puts himself into harm’s way to stop them", saying that this was similar for what showrunner Chris Chibnall had been criticised for.

== In print ==
Rogue
- Author: Kate Herron; Briony Redman
- Series: Doctor Who book: Target novelisations
- Publisher: BBC Books
- Publication date: 8 August 2024
- Pages: 192
- ISBN: 9781785948831

A novelisation of the episode was written by Kate Herron and Briony Redman and made available for pre-order in June 2024. It was released as both a paperback and audiobook on 8 August 2024 as part of the Target Collection.
