= Susan Twist =

British actress (born 1956)

- Born: 6 June 1956 (age 70); Liverpool, England
- Occupation: Actor
- Years active: 1980–present
- Known for: Doctor Who

Susan Twist (born 6 June 1956) is a British actress best known as Rosie Banks in Brookside (1994–1996) and as Susan Triad (Note: Twist appeared as different variations of Susan Triad in various episodes of the fourteenth series, being credited as different roles depending on the episode.) in Doctor Who (2023–2025).

== Early life ==
Twist was born in Liverpool. She attended the London Academy of Music and Dramatic Art from 1975 to 1978.

== Career ==
Twist has appeared in various episodes of Doctors, In the Flesh, Coronation Street and The Archers.

On stage, she has appeared in productions of The Three Musketeers, Prize Night, Jack Flash and The Taming of the Shrew.

In 2023, she appeared in the second 60th anniversary episode of Doctor Who, "Wild Blue Yonder", playing Mrs Merridew, Isaac Newton's maid. She then appeared in the 2023 Christmas special, "The Church on Ruby Road", where she played a different character, now a woman in the crowd of a concert. She subsequently re-appeared in the first six episodes of the fourteenth series as different characters, (Note: In episode 6, "Rogue", Twist does not appear in person, however, a portrait painting of her is seen.) before being revealed as the character Susan Triad in that series' two-part finale, "The Legend of Ruby Sunday" and "Empire of Death". In 2025, it was announced she would return for the show's fifteenth series, with Twist returning in the series' two-part finale, "Wish World"/"The Reality War".

== Filmography ==
=== Film ===
Year	Title	Role	Notes
2018	Playing Dead	Jenny	Short film
2026	Reckless	Rebecca	

=== Television ===
Year	Title	Role	Notes
1980	The Squad	Wendy	1 episode
1981	The Chinese Detective	Receptionist	1 episode
1982	God Speed Co-Operation	Betty	Television film
1985	Brookside	Jean	3 episodes
1994–1996	Brookside	Rosie Banks	Regular role
1998	Reckless: The Sequel	Vicar	Television film
1998	The Bill	Prison Officer	1 episode
2000	Always and Everyone	Court Welfare Officer	1 episode
2002	Coronation Street	Donna Stout	2 episodes
2002	A Good Thief	Mrs. Sutherland	Television film
2003	The Bill	D.C.I. Dixon	1 episode
2005	Girls in Love	Manager	2 episodes
2006	The Royal	Joan Travis	1 episode
2006	See No Evil: The Moors Murders	Nellie Hindley	2 episodes
2007	Doctors	Jean Highsmith	1 episode
2013	Being Eileen	Beedie	2 episodes
2013	In the Flesh	Mrs. Bennett	2 episodes
2017	Coronation Street	Lydia Hartman	2 episodes
2017	Eric, Ernie and Me	Patsy	Television film
2023–2025	Doctor Who	Various (Note: Twist's principal role is her appearance as Susan Triad from "The Legend of Ruby Sunday" onwards.)	Recurring role (10 episodes) (Note: 3 uncredited.)
2024–2025	Doctor Who: Unleashed	Herself	

=== Podcast series ===
Year	Title	Role	Notes
2018	Stone	Grace Peverall	3 episodes
2020	The Archers	Megan Miller	1 episode
