= Amol Rajan =

British journalist and broadcaster (born 1983)

- Born: V. Amol; 4 July 1983 (age 43); Calcutta (now Kolkata), India
- Other name: Amol Varadarajan
- Education: Graveney School; Downing College, Cambridge (BA)
- Occupation: Journalist
- Years active: 2006–present
- Employer(s): BBC; Channel 5 The Independent
- Title: Editor of The Independent (2013–2016); Media Editor of BBC News (2016–2023); Presenter Today (2021–2026); Presenter University Challenge (2023–present)
- Spouse: Charlotte Faircloth (m. 2013)
- Children: 4

Amol Rajan (/əˈmoʊl/, ə-MOHL; born 4 July 1983) is an Indian–British journalist, broadcaster and writer working in the United Kingdom. Formerly the media editor of BBC News, he presented the Today programme on BBC Radio 4 from 2021 to 2026. He has presented University Challenge on BBC Two since 2023. Prior to joining the BBC, Rajan was the editor of The Independent newspaper between 2013 and 2016.

== Early life and education ==
Rajan was born in 1983 in Kolkata, India, to a mother from Pune and a Tamil father from Kumbakonam. Because of Tamil naming customs, Rajan was born V. Amol, with the V. for his father's given name of Varadarajan. This name was modified to Amol Varadarajan when he came to England and the family later adopted the surname Rajan.

Rajan, who has an older brother, was three when his family moved to Chiswick, he later attended Hillbrook Primary School in Tooting, South West London, where he was raised. The son of Hindu parents, he has said that he has been a "non-believer" in religion since the age of 15 and that he does not believe in God. Rajan was educated at Graveney School in Tooting and graduated with a degree in English from Downing College, Cambridge, contributing to and editing the Varsity student newspaper. At the age of 18, Rajan worked in the Foreign and Commonwealth Office (FCO) through his gap year.

== Career ==
Rajan was the secondary presenter on The Wright Stuff, the daytime talk show on the Five network, during its 2006–2007 series. He was also a researcher on the programme.

He joined The Independent newspaper in August 2007, where he was over the next few years a news reporter, sports correspondent, columnist, comment editor, and editor of Independent Voices. He has also written a Monday column for the London Evening Standard and restaurant criticism for The Independent on Sunday. He has contributed to The Salisbury Review which, according to Rajan, "still publishes writing on politics, history and culture that is among the finest produced in English today. It is frequently offensive, and I cannot say I often agree with its editorial position, but that is all the more reason to read it."

In 2013, aged 29, Rajan became the editor of The Independent. He has been described as the first non-white editor of a national newspaper. For about eighteen months before his appointment, Rajan was the media advisor to the Independent's proprietor Evgeny Lebedev, the son of Alexander Lebedev, a former KGB economic attaché. Rajan's predecessor as editor of The Independent, Chris Blackhurst, became Group Content Director. When Lebedev announced a move to digital-only in February 2016, with the imminent closure of the print edition, it emerged that Rajan would remain with the company to help facilitate the change in direction. During an October 2019 broadcast Rajan presented for BBC Radio 2 in 2019, journalist Peter Oborne accused Rajan of engaging in "client" and "crony" journalism.

Rajan's role as editor-at-large for The Independent website ended after he was appointed the BBC's first Media Editor in November 2016, and he assumed his new post on 12 December. He has also hosted The Big Debate on the BBC Asian Network.

Since 2017, Rajan has provided holiday cover for several presenters on BBC Radio 2, including Simon Mayo, Jeremy Vine and Zoe Ball. Rajan has occasionally presented The One Show. From May 2017 he formerly presented The Media Show on BBC Radio 4 in succession to Steve Hewlett, stepping down from that role when he joined the presenting team of the Today programme in 2021. In 2026, Rajan confirmed that he would be leaving the Today programme and its weekly 5.7m listeners, in order to set up his own production company. His Today salary is shown as £315,000.

In 2023, Rajan took over from Jeremy Paxman as the host of University Challenge for the 53rd series. Rajan had himself appeared on Christmas University Challenge (a version for celebrity alumni) in December 2020, representing Downing College.

In June 2023, Rajan secured an interview for the BBC with former TV presenter Phillip Schofield, the first on TV since Schofield's resignation from ITV in May 2023.

In May 2024, he appeared as himself in the Doctor Who episodes "73 Yards" and "Empire of Death", interviewing Roger ap Gwilliam (Aneurin Barnard).

In August 2024, he appeared as himself in episode 1 of series 3 of Industry, where he is referred to as "a f*****g tote bag journalist..".

In April 2026, he was the guest of Gyles Brandreth's Rosebud podcast, in which he spoke of his family background and his career, and shared his ambitions for the future.

He presented his final Today show on 2 September 2026.

In September 2026, he wrote the Diary column for The Spectator magazine.

Rajan appeared on the second series of The Celebrity Traitors in October 2026.

=== Opinions on the royal family ===
The Guardian wrote: "Amol Rajan, (...) is a declared republican who once branded the royal family as 'absurd' and the media as a 'propaganda outlet' for the monarchy." In 2021, he publicly apologised for comments made in a 2012 article he wrote for The Independent, in which he described Prince Philip as a "racist buffoon" and Prince Charles (now Charles III) as "scientifically illiterate", and for an open letter he sent to Prince William and his wife Catherine while the two were expecting their first child, in which he described their public role as a "total fraud", the Queen's Diamond Jubilee as a "celebration of mediocrity", and the royal family as a clan "unusually full of fools".

In November 2021, the BBC broadcast The Princes and the Press, a two-part documentary presented by Rajan that explored the relationship between the royal family and the media; described as 'not his finest work', the programme (which drew mainly on royal correspondents and 'Harry and Meghan's advocates – the Duchess’ lawyer Jenny Afia, and her biographer Omid Scobie') prompted close to a thousand complaints of bias. He also narrated the BBC podcast Harry, Meghan and the Media, which was released in January 2022.

== Personal life ==
Rajan is a cricket enthusiast, and plays for the Authors XI. His first book, Twirlymen, the Unlikely History of Cricket's Greatest Spin Bowlers, was published by Random House in 2011. In September 2013 he married academic Charlotte Faircloth in Cambridge. They live in London and have four children.

Media offices
Preceded by Chris Blackhurst	Editor of The Independent; 2013–2016	Succeeded by Christian Broughton
Preceded by Position established	Media Editor: BBC News; 2016–2023	Succeeded by Katie Razzall
