= Genesis Lynea =

Bermudian actress and singer

- Born: Genesis Lynea Edwards
- Education: ArtsEd (BA)
- Occupations: Actress, dancer, singer
- Years active: 2010–present
- Height: 5 ft 8 in (173 cm)

Genesis Lynea Edwards is a Bermudian actress, dancer and singer. Among other stage roles, she originated the role of Anna of Cleves in the original London production of the musical Six. On television, she is known for her roles as in the BBC medical drama Casualty (2019–2020) and the crime drama Silent Witness (2021).

== Early life ==
Lynea decided she wanted to be a performer and transferred to Arts Educational School (ArtsEd) in Chiswick, graduating with a Bachelor of Arts in Musical Theatre in 2013.

== Career ==
Lynea's first performing experience was at the ENO as a part of the children's ensemble for The Magic Flute. Once the family moved back to London in 2006, Lynea went to LaSwap where she and some friends founded Britain's first Krump family, called Krumpire, which later developed into Wet Wipez. Soon after, she featured in Jessie J's debut music video "Do It Like A Dude". For the 2012 London Olympics, she was selected for Project 32, a project by Adidas putting skilled teenagers from London on billboards. Lynea's early stage work included roles in productions of The Bodyguard, Bend It Like Beckham: The Musical, the Olivier Award winning Jesus Christ Superstar, and In the Heights as well as the role of Pilar in a 2016 production of Legally Blonde at The Curve in Leicester.

Lynea starred in the 2017 production of The Wild Party at The Other Palace. She then landed roles in Ode to Leeds at West Yorkshire Playhouse and Collective Rage: A Play in Five Betties. She landed the starring role of Anna of Cleves in the original cast of Six at the Arts Theatre and recording on the 2018 SIX Studio album that has recently sold over 100,000 copies worldwide. Lynea made her television debut in 2018 with the main role of Miss Maddie Harper in series 7 and 8 of CBBC series 4 O'Clock Club. She secured her first theatrical lead at The Old Vic in Sylvia.

Lynea has filmed a few short films including Love is a Hand Grenade which won 'Best LGBT' at the Bristol Independent Film Festival.

On 23 March 2019, she began appearing as Archie Hudson in the BBC medical drama Casualty. In 2021, she joined the cast for series 24 of the long-running BBC crime drama Silent Witness as pathologist Simone Tyler. The following year, she had recurring roles as vampire Geraldine Newcopse in the third series of Sky's A Discovery of Witches.

== Personal life ==
Lynea is queer, and appeared in an issue of the Gay Times in 2019.

== Filmography ==
=== Television and film ===
Year	Title	Role	Notes
2018–2019	4 O'Clock Club	Maddie Harper	Main role (series 7–8)
2019–2020	Casualty	Archie Hudson	Series regular
2019	Samsonite: Born to Go	Voiceover	Advertisement
2019	How Can I Forget	Connie Mellon	Short film
2020	Love is a Hand Grenade	Gabby	Short Film
2021	The Cost of Living	Death	Short film
2021	Finding Dad	Dionne	Short Film
2021	Shadow and Bone	Natacha	Episode: "A Searing Burst of Light"
2021	Silent Witness	Simone Tyler	Series 24 Regular
2022	A Discovery of Witches	Geraldine Newcopse	4 episodes
2022	The Baby	Sam	4 episodes
2023	Champion	Tayo	Supporting role
2023–2024	Death in Paradise	Andrina Harper	Recurring role, 3 episodes
2024	Halo	Lance Corporal Bowman	Episode: "Sanctuary"
2024	Doctor Who	Harriet Arbinger	2 episodes: "The Legend of Ruby Sunday" and "Empire of Death"
2025	Sister Boniface Mysteries	Charity Gray	Episode: "The Happiest Family"
2025	Christmas Karma	Soul Sista	
2026	Crookhaven	Whisper	

=== Music videos ===
Song	Year	Artist	Notes
"Do It like a Dude"	2010	Jessie J	

== Stage ==
Year	Title	Role	Notes
2012–2014	The Bodyguard	Ensemble	Adelphi Theatre, London
2015–2016	Bend It Like Beckham: The Musical	Ensemble	Phoenix Theatre, London
2016	Legally Blonde	Pilar	The Curve, Leicester
2016	Jesus Christ Superstar	Soul Girl	Regent's Park Open Air Theatre, London
2016	In the Heights	Ensemble	King's Cross Theatre, London
2017	The Wild Party	Oscar D'Armano	Directed The Other Palace, London
2017	Ode to Leeds	Queenie	Leeds Playhouse, Leeds
2017	Six	Anna of Cleves	Arts Theatre, London
2017–2018	Collective Rage: A Play in Five Betties	Betty 5 / Richard	Southwark Playhouse, London
2018	Sylvia	Sylvia Pankhurst	The Old Vic, London
