= Jamie Donoughue =

British film director

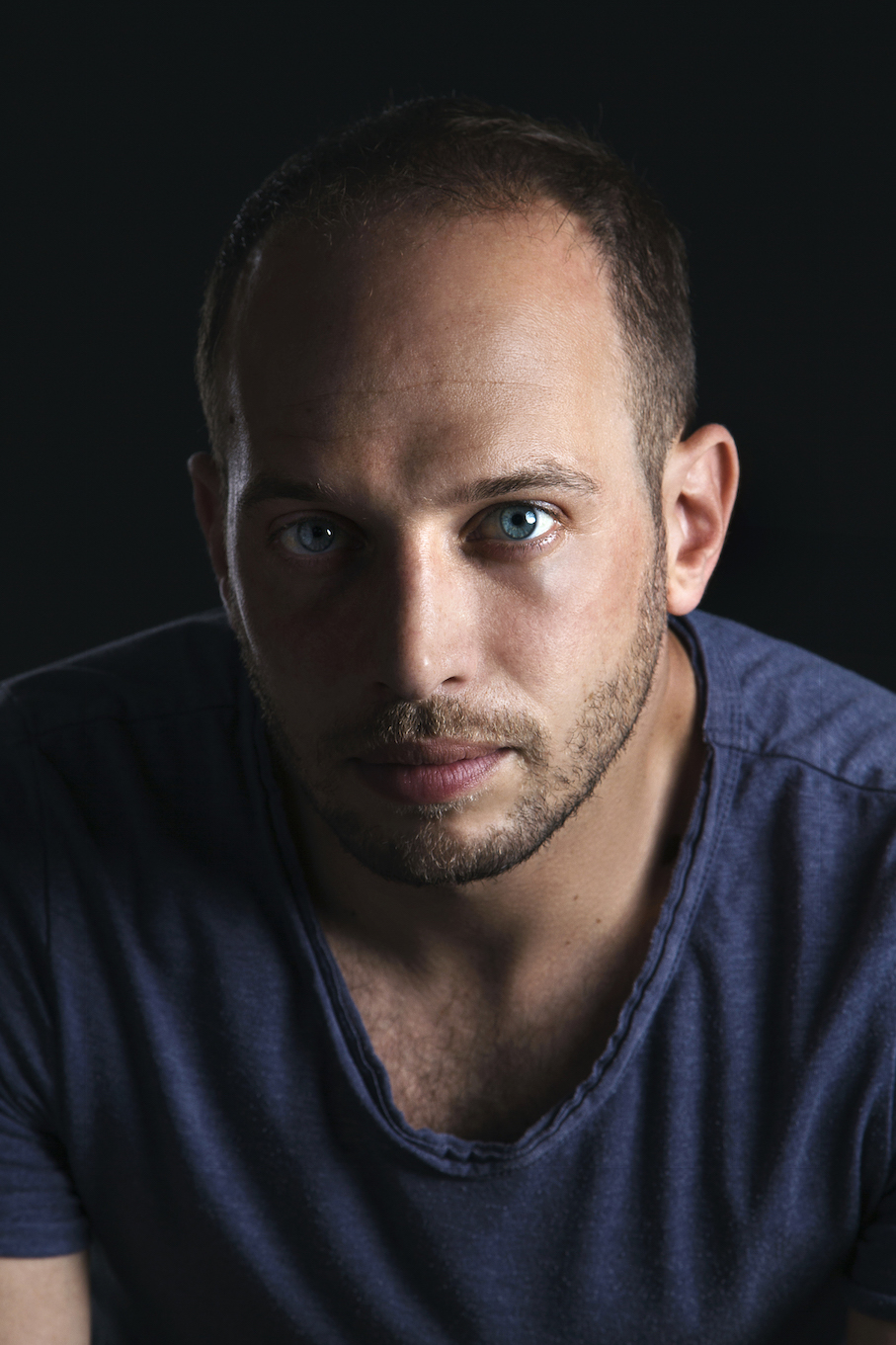
- Donoughue in 2015
- Born: James Oliver Donoughue
- Occupations: Director, producer, writer
- Years active: 2015–present

Jamie Oliver Donoughue is a British film director, producer and writer. He is known for his 2015 short film Shok that received critical praise and multiple international awards, including an Academy Award for Best Live Action Short Film nomination at the 88th Academy Awards. His television directing credits include the BBC and Netflix drama The Last Kingdom, the Netflix original series The Innocents, the series finale of ITV's Endeavour and lead director for the concluding series of A Discovery of Witches for Sky Max. Most recently he was lead director for Sky's crime thriller A Town Called Malice and directed the Series 14 finale of Doctor Who for the BBC and Disney+.

== Filmography ==
=== Film ===
Year	Title	Director	Executive producer	Writer	Notes
2015	Shok	Yes	Yes	Yes	Short film

=== Television ===
Year	Show	Credited as				Notes
Year	Show	Director	Writer	Producer	Actor	Notes
2017	The Last Kingdom	Yes	No	No	No	2 episodes
2018	The Innocents	Yes	No	No	No	2 episodes
2019	Endeavour	Yes	No	No	No	1 episode
2022	A Discovery of Witches	Yes	No	Yes	No	4 episodes
2023	A Town Called Malice	Yes	No	Yes	No	3 episodes
2023–24	Doctor Who	Yes	No	No	No	2 episodes; 1 mini-episode
2024	Tales of the TARDIS	Yes	No	No	No	1 episode
TBA	Maya	Yes	No	Yes	No	6 episodes
