= List of Doctor Who cast members =

This is a list of actors who have appeared in the long-running British science fiction television series, Doctor Who.

== Series main cast ==
The following tables are an overview of all the regular cast members that have appeared throughout the show since 1963.

=== 1963–1973 ===
William Hartnell, Carole Ann Ford, William Russell and Jacqueline Hill first appeared as the Doctor, Susan Foreman, Ian Chesterton and Barbara Wright respectively in the show's debut serial; An Unearthly Child. Ford departed in The Dalek Invasion of Earth in 1964 and was replaced by Maureen O'Brien playing a character called Vicki. Russell and Hill departed together the following year in The Chase and were subsequently replaced by Peter Purves as Steven Taylor. Adrienne Hill took over from O'Brien for a short period of time as Katarina. Jean Marsh subsequently played the character of Sara Kingdom also for a short period of time before being replaced by Jackie Lane as Dodo Chaplet in The Massacre in 1966. Purves and Lane stepped down from their roles at around the same time and were replaced by Anneke Wills and Michael Craze who played Polly and Ben Jackson.

Patrick Troughton took over from Hartnell in the fourth season as the Second Doctor and starred alongside Wills and Craze and, after they stepped down, Deborah Watling, Frazer Hines and Wendy Padbury who respectively played Victoria Waterfield, Jamie McCrimmon and Zoe Heriot. At the end of The War Games, Troughton was replaced by Jon Pertwee who began his run as the Third Doctor alongside Caroline John as Liz Shaw in the 1970 serial; Spearhead from Space. John departed after Inferno and Katy Manning as Jo Grant, her replacement, appeared in the following serial Terror of the Autons. Throughout Pertwee's run, Nicholas Courtney, Richard Franklin and John Levene made regular appearances as The Brigadier, Mike Yates and Sergeant Benton respectively.

Actor	Character		Appearances									
Actor	Character		Season 1 (1963–64)	Season 2 (1964–65)	Season 3 (1965–66)	Season 4 (1966–67)	Season 5 (1967–68)	Season 6 (1968–69)	Season 7 (1970)	Season 8 (1971)	Season 9 (1972)	Season 10 (1972–73)
William Hartnell	The Doctor	First	Starring	Starring	Starring	Starring						Guest
Patrick Troughton	The Doctor	Second				Starring	Starring	Starring				Guest
Jon Pertwee	The Doctor	Third							Starring	Starring	Starring	Starring
Carole Ann Ford	Susan Foreman	Susan Foreman	Starring	Starring								
William Russell	Ian Chesterton	Ian Chesterton	Starring	Starring								
Jacqueline Hill	Barbara Wright	Barbara Wright	Starring	Starring								
Maureen O'Brien	Vicki	Vicki		Starring	Starring							
Peter Purves	Steven Taylor	Steven Taylor		Starring	Starring							
Adrienne Hill	Katarina	Katarina			Starring							
Jean Marsh	Sara Kingdom	Sara Kingdom			Starring							
Jackie Lane	Dodo Chaplet	Dodo Chaplet			Starring							
Anneke Wills	Polly	Polly			Starring	Starring						
Michael Craze	Ben Jackson	Ben Jackson			Starring	Starring						
Frazer Hines	Jamie McCrimmon	Jamie McCrimmon				Starring	Starring	Starring				
Deborah Watling	Victoria Waterfield	Victoria Waterfield				Starring	Starring					
Wendy Padbury	Zoe Heriot	Zoe Heriot					Starring	Starring				
Caroline John	Liz Shaw	Liz Shaw							Starring			
Nicholas Courtney	The Brigadier	The Brigadier					Guest	Guest	Starring	Starring	Starring	Starring
John Levene	Sergeant Benton	Sergeant Benton						Guest	Starring	Starring	Starring	Starring
Katy Manning	Jo Grant	Jo Grant								Starring	Starring	Starring
Roger Delgado	The Master	The Master								Starring	Recurring	Guest
Richard Franklin	Mike Yates	Mike Yates								Starring	Starring	Starring

=== 1973–1981 ===
Katy Manning stepped down from the role of Jo Grant at the end of the tenth season in The Green Death. She was replaced by Elisabeth Sladen in The Time Warrior as Sarah Jane Smith. Jon Pertwee was subsequently replaced by Tom Baker at the end of Season 11 in Planet of the Spiders. Nicholas Courtney and John Levene reprised their roles as the Brigadier and Sergeant Benton numerous times during Baker's run. The Fourth Doctor and Sarah Jane were joined on their adventures by Harry Sullivan, played by Ian Marter, before he left them in Terror of the Zygons. After one more season, Sladen left the role of Sarah Jane Smith in the 1976 serial; The Hand of Fear. Louise Jameson debuted in The Face of Evil portraying a character called Leela. They were joined by K-9 in The Invisible Enemy, a robotic dog voiced by John Leeson and, on a few occasions; David Brierly.

Jameson was replaced by Mary Tamm, who played Romana, a Time Lady and one of the Doctor's own species. Tamm stayed on for just one season before her character regenerated in Destiny of the Daleks and was portrayed by Lalla Ward. Baker, Ward and Leeson were joined by Matthew Waterhouse, the actor who played Adric, in Full Circle. Romana and K-9 departed together in Warriors' Gate. The 1981 serial Logopolis was the first to introduce Sarah Sutton and Janet Fielding as Nyssa and Tegan Jovanka respectively, but the last to star Tom Baker as the Doctor.

Actor	Character		Appearances							
Actor	Character		Season 11 (1973–74)	Season 12 (1974–75)	Season 13 (1975–76)	Season 14 (1976–77)	Season 15 (1977–78)	Season 16 (1978–79)	Season 17 (1979–80)	Season 18 (1980–81)
Jon Pertwee	The Doctor	Third	Starring							
Tom Baker	The Doctor	Fourth	Guest	Starring	Starring	Starring	Starring	Starring	Starring	Starring
Peter Davison	The Doctor	Fifth								Guest
Nicholas Courtney	The Brigadier	The Brigadier	Starring	Guest	Guest					
John Levene	Sergeant Benton	Sergeant Benton	Starring	Guest	Recurring					
Richard Franklin	Mike Yates	Mike Yates	Starring							
Elisabeth Sladen	Sarah Jane Smith	Sarah Jane Smith	Starring	Starring	Starring	Starring				
Ian Marter	Harry Sullivan	Harry Sullivan		Starring	Starring					
Peter Pratt	The Master	The Master				Guest				
Geoffrey Beevers	The Master	The Master								Guest
Anthony Ainley	The Master	The Master								Recurring
Louise Jameson	Leela	Leela				Starring	Starring			
John Leeson	K-9						Starring	Starring		Starring
David Brierly	K-9								Starring	
Mary Tamm	Romana	I						Starring		
Lalla Ward	Romana	II							Starring	Starring
Matthew Waterhouse	Adric	Adric								Starring
Sarah Sutton	Nyssa	Nyssa								Starring
Janet Fielding	Tegan Jovanka	Tegan Jovanka								Starring

=== 1982–1996 ===
Peter Davison starred as the Fifth Doctor starting in the nineteenth season alongside Matthew Waterhouse, Sarah Sutton and Janet Fielding, before Waterhouse departed when Adric was dramatically killed off in Earthshock. In Mawdryn Undead, a new companion called Vislor Turlough was introduced, played by Mark Strickson. Sutton stepped down from the role of Nyssa in Terminus and Kamelion, an unusual robotic character voiced by Gerald Flood, was introduced in The King's Demons.

For "The Five Doctors" – the show's 20th anniversary special – Carole Ann Ford, Nicholas Courtney, Elisabeth Sladen, Lalla Ward, Wendy Padbury, Caroline John, Richard Franklin, John Leeson and Frazer Hines reprised their roles as, respectively, Susan Foreman, Brigadier Lethbridge-Stewart, Sarah Jane Smith, Romana, Zoe Heriot, Liz Shaw, Mike Yates, K-9 and Jamie McCrimmon. The special was broadcast between the twentieth and twenty-first seasons.

Davison, Fielding and Strickson continued on until Fielding stepped down from the role in Resurrection of the Daleks. She was replaced in Planet of Fire by Nicola Bryant as Peri Brown, a serial which also marked the final appearance of Strickson and Flood. Davison was replaced by Colin Baker in The Caves of Androzani and Bryant was replaced with Bonnie Langford as Mel Bush, a few years later, after her character was killed off in Mindwarp. Sylvester McCoy took over from Baker in Time and the Rani and Langford was replaced by Sophie Aldred as Ace at the end of the twenty-fourth season. The series was axed in 1989, but a TV movie was made in 1996 which saw Paul McGann taking over from McCoy.

Actor	Character		Appearances									
Actor	Character		Season 19 (1982)	Season 20 (1983)	Special (1983)	Season 21 (1984)	Season 22 (1985)	Season 23 (1986)	Season 24 (1987)	Season 25 (1988–89)	Season 26 (1989)	Movie (1996)
Peter Davison	The Doctor	Fifth	Starring	Starring	Starring	Starring						
Richard Hurndall	The Doctor	First			Starring							
William Hartnell	The Doctor	First			Archive							
Patrick Troughton	The Doctor	Second			Starring		Starring					
Jon Pertwee	The Doctor	Third			Starring							
Tom Baker	The Doctor	Fourth			Archive							
Colin Baker	The Doctor	Sixth				Starring	Starring	Starring				
Sylvester McCoy	The Doctor	Seventh							Starring	Starring	Starring	Guest
Paul McGann	The Doctor	Eighth										Starring
Anthony Ainley	The Master	The Master	Recurring	Recurring	Guest	Guest	Guest	Guest			Guest	
Eric Roberts	The Master	The Master										Special Guest
Matthew Waterhouse	Adric	Adric	Starring			Guest						
Sarah Sutton	Nyssa	Nyssa	Starring	Starring		Guest						
Janet Fielding	Tegan Jovanka	Tegan Jovanka	Starring	Starring	Starring	Starring						
Mark Strickson	Vislor Turlough	Vislor Turlough		Starring	Starring	Starring						
Nicholas Courtney	The Brigadier	The Brigadier		Guest	Starring						Guest	
Carole Ann Ford	Susan Foreman	Susan Foreman			Starring							
Elisabeth Sladen	Sarah Jane Smith	Sarah Jane Smith			Starring							
Gerald Flood	Kamelion	Kamelion		Starring		Starring						
Nicola Bryant	Peri Brown	Peri Brown				Starring	Starring	Starring				
Frazer Hines	Jamie McCrimmon	Jamie McCrimmon			Guest		Starring					
Bonnie Langford	Mel Bush	Mel Bush						Starring	Starring			
Sophie Aldred	Ace	Ace							Starring	Starring	Starring	

=== 2005–2011 ===
Upon the revival of Doctor Who, Christopher Eccleston would be the first actor to portray the newest incarnation of the Doctor. Multiple actresses were considered to play the Doctor's next companion, with Billie Piper announced as the frontrunner to star as Rose Taylor. The role ultimately went to Piper, with the character’s name changed to Rose Tyler. Eccleston and Piper made their debut in "Rose". For the second half of the first series they were joined by John Barrowman as Captain Jack Harkness. Due to disagreements with the producers and network executives, Eccleston departed after a single series and was succeeded by David Tennant portraying the Tenth Doctor beginning at the end of "The Parting of the Ways". Barrowman was also written off at the end of this series and would go on to lead his own spin-off series, Torchwood. Tennant's first full episode was "The Christmas Invasion" which led into the second series with Piper continuing her role. Elisabeth Sladen and John Leeson returned to Doctor Who in the series two episode "School Reunion" reprising their roles as Sarah Jane Smith and K-9, respectively. The two would also go on to star in their own spin-off, The Sarah Jane Adventures. Piper left in the second series finale, "Doomsday". Catherine Tate starred as Donna Noble, the Doctor's one off companion in "The Runaway Bride", and was briefly introduced in "Doomsday". Freema Agyeman replaced Piper for the series three, and appeared as Martha Jones from "Smith and Jones" to "Last of the Time Lords". Agyeman had previously appeared in a separate role in "Doomsday" and was cast as Jones following positive reception from the producers; the two characters were later explained to be cousins. Barrowman briefly re-joined the show for the three-part third series finale. Derek Jacobi and John Simm portrayed new incarnations of the Master.

Tennant was joined by Kylie Minogue portraying Astrid Peth in the 2008 Christmas special, "Voyage of the Damned". This episode also introduced Bernard Cribbins as Wilfred Mott, later revealed to be Donna's grandfather, who would continue to recur across series four. Cribbins was not originally expected to appear outside of the special, but was asked to return in place of Howard Attfield who had portrayed Donna's dad Geoff and died unexpectedly while filming was still underway. Despite having another actress and character lined up for the fourth series, the producers ultimately decided to ask Tate to return instead. Piper returned for this series making a set of various cameo appearances. Ageyman also returned for three episodes mid-series. Alex Kingston was introduced as a mysterious time-traveler called River Song in the later portion of the series during which her character was killed-off. The series four two-part finale saw numerous cast members return including Piper, Barrowman, Agyeman, Sladen, and Leeson, while also featuring the departure of Tate. Tennant decided to leave the role following a series of specials which featured David Morrissey, Michelle Ryan, and Lindsay Duncan as one-time companions in their respective episodes. "The End of Time" saw the return of Cribbins, this time as the Doctor's companion. This episode also saw brief cameo appearances from Piper, Tate, Agyeman, Barrowman, and Sladen ahead of Tennant's regeneration.

Matt Smith was named as Tennant's replacement as the Eleventh Doctor and first appeared in "The End of Time". In the fifth series premiere, "The Eleventh Hour", Karen Gillan joined Smith and played Amy Pond. Gillan previously played a soothsayer in the series four episode "The Fires of Pompeii" Rory Williams was introduced as a recurring character portrayed by Arthur Darvill. Kingston was re-introduced in the fifth series and was revealed as another time traveler who meets with the Doctor out of order. Darvill was then promoted to the main cast beginning with "The Impossible Astronaut", the series six opening episode. Kingston continued to recur throughout the sixth series as well.

Actor	Character		Appearances										
Actor	Character		Series 1 (2005)	Special (2005)	Series 2 (2006)	Special (2006)	Series 3 (2007)	Special (2007)	Series 4 (2008)	Specials (2008–10)	Series 5 (2010)	Special (2010)	Series 6 (2011)
Christopher Eccleston	The Doctor	Ninth	Main										
David Tennant	The Doctor	Tenth	Guest	Main	Main	Main	Main	Main	Main	Main			
Matt Smith	The Doctor	Eleventh								Guest	Main	Main	Main
Billie Piper	Rose Tyler	Rose Tyler	Main	Main	Main				Main	Guest			
Catherine Tate	Donna Noble	Donna Noble			Guest	Main			Main	Guest			
Freema Agyeman	Martha Jones	Martha Jones					Main		Main	Guest			
John Barrowman	Jack Harkness	Jack Harkness	Recurring				Main		Main	Guest			
Kylie Minogue	Astrid Peth	Astrid Peth						Main					
Elisabeth Sladen	Sarah Jane Smith	Sarah Jane Smith			Guest				Main	Guest			
John Leeson	K-9				Guest				Guest				
David Morrissey	Jackson Lake	Jackson Lake								Main			
Michelle Ryan	Christina de Souza	Christina de Souza								Main			
Lindsay Duncan	Adelaide Brooke	Adelaide Brooke								Main			
Derek Jacobi	The Master	The Master					Guest						
John Simm	The Master	The Master					Recurring			Main			
Bernard Cribbins	Wilfred Mott	Wilfred Mott						Guest	Recurring	Main			
Alex Kingston	River Song	River Song							Guest		Recurring		Recurring
Karen Gillan	Amy Pond	Amy Pond									Main	Main	Main
Arthur Darvill	Rory Williams	Rory Williams									Recurring	Main	Main

=== 2011–2017 ===
Smith continued his role throughout the entirety of the seventh series and the following specials. Claire Skinner starred as Madge Arwell in the Christmas special that preceded series seven. This special also saw Gillan and Darvill make guest appearances. The two then returned for the first part of the series before departing in "The Angels Take Manhattan". Jenna-Louise Coleman was announced as a new companion, Clara Oswald, to succeed Gillan and Darvill. Coleman made an unannounced guest appearance (as Oswin Oswald) in the series opener, "Asylum of the Daleks", before joining the main cast from "The Snowmen". Alex Kingston continued to recur in the series. Beginning with the subsequent specials Coleman dropped "Louise" from her acting name. The first special celebrating the fiftieth anniversary of the series was titled "The Day of the Doctor" and saw the return of David Tennant and Billie Piper. Christopher Eccleston was initially set to return in the special as well but was later replaced by John Hurt, who played an incarnation of the Doctor not previously known. Gillan made a brief cameo appearance in the second and final special, "The Time of the Doctor". This episode also saw the departure of Smith.

Peter Capaldi took over as the Twelfth Doctor following Smith's departure and debuted his first full episode in "Deep Breath". Capaldi made a cameo appearance in "The Day of the Doctor" and a guest appearance at the end of "The Time of the Doctor" after being cast in the role. He had also previously appeared in the Doctor Who episode "The Fires of Pompeii" and in the third series of spin-off series Torchwood, roles which were later connected to the Twelfth Doctor. Smith also held a minor role in "Deep Breath" in an appearance that was filmed prior to his departure. Coleman returned once more for the eighth and ninth series before exiting in "Hell Bent". Michelle Gomez appeared throughout the eighth series as an unknown character that was later revealed to be the next incarnation of the Master, this time going by Missy. Gomez also appeared in the two-part ninth series premiere. The Christmas special that bridged the two series featured an appearance by Nick Frost as Santa Claus, a role that was introduced through a cameo in the eighth series finale.

Coleman's departure was followed by two Christmas specials ahead of the tenth series, the first of which featured a final appearance by Kingston and the second featuring the return of Matt Lucas as Nardole from the first, but this time in a starring role. Lucas continued this role through the end of the tenth series which also saw the introduction of Pearl Mackie portraying Bill Potts. Gomez recurred once more in the series and Simm reprised his role alongside Gomez in the tenth series finale. The "Twice Upon a Time" Christmas special included the departure of both Capaldi and Mackie from the series. It also saw one-off appearances by David Bradley who had been cast as the First Doctor and Mark Gatiss as The Captain. Bradley was first introduced in the final episode of the tenth series. Coleman and Lucas both made guest appearances in the special as well. The Thirteenth Doctor, portrayed by Jodie Whittaker, was introduced at the end of the episode.

Actor	Character		Appearances											
Actor	Character		Special (2011)	Series 7 Part 1 (2012)	Special (2012)	Series 7 Part 2 (2013)	Specials (2013)	Series 8 (2014)	Special (2014)	Series 9 (2015)	Special (2015)	Special (2016)	Series 10 (2017)	Special (2017)
Matt Smith	The Doctor	Eleventh	Main	Main	Main	Main	Main	Guest						
David Tennant	The Doctor	Tenth					Main							
John Hurt	The Doctor	War				Guest	Main							
Peter Capaldi	The Doctor	Twelfth					Guest	Main	Main	Main	Main	Main	Main	Main
William Hartnell	The Doctor	First					Archive							
David Bradley	The Doctor	First											Guest	Main
Patrick Troughton	The Doctor	Second					Archive							
Jon Pertwee	The Doctor	Third					Archive							
Tom Baker	The Doctor	Fourth					Archive							
Peter Davison	The Doctor	Fifth					Archive							
Colin Baker	The Doctor	Sixth					Archive							
Sylvester McCoy	The Doctor	Seventh					Archive							
Paul McGann	The Doctor	Eighth					Archive							
Christopher Eccleston	The Doctor	Ninth					Archive							
Jodie Whittaker	The Doctor	Thirteenth												Guest
Claire Skinner	Madge Arwell	Madge Arwell	Main											
Karen Gillan	Amy Pond	Amy Pond	Guest	Main			Guest							
Arthur Darvill	Rory Williams	Rory Williams	Guest	Main										
Jenna Coleman	Clara Oswald	Clara Oswald		Guest	Main	Main	Main	Main	Main	Main				Guest
Alex Kingston	River Song	River Song		Guest		Guest					Main			
Billie Piper	Rose Tyler	Rose Tyler					Main							
Michelle Gomez	The Master / Missy	The Master / Missy						Recurring		Guest			Recurring	
John Simm	The Master / Missy	The Master / Missy											Guest	
Nick Frost	Santa Claus	Santa Claus						Guest	Main					
Matt Lucas	Nardole	Nardole									Guest	Main	Main	Guest
Pearl Mackie	Bill Potts	Bill Potts											Main	Main
Mark Gatiss	The Captain	The Captain												Main

=== 2018–2025 ===
Whittaker's first series as the Thirteenth Doctor began its broadcast in late 2018. Bradley Walsh, Tosin Cole and Mandip Gill replaced Mackie and Lucas as the companions for the show. The twelfth series saw the reintroduction of the Master, this time played by Sacha Dhawan who recurred across the series. Meanwhile, Barrowman briefly returned to Doctor Who as Harkness in "Fugitive of the Judoon", after a ten year absence from the series, and starred in the 2021 New Year's Day special, "Revolution of the Daleks". "Fugitive of the Judoon" also introduced a new, previously unknown, incarnation of the Doctor referred to as the Fugitive Doctor portrayed by Jo Martin, a role that carried over into the thirteenth series and subsequent specials as well as the fifteenth series.

Walsh and Cole left the series following "Revolution of the Daleks", and were succeeded by John Bishop for the thirteenth series. Whittaker, Gill, and Bishop continued their roles through the 2022 specials; Whittaker then departed alongside Gill and Bishop. The final special, "The Power of the Doctor", commemorating the BBC's centenary, saw the return of David Bradley, Peter Davison, Colin Baker, Sylvester McCoy, and Paul McGann as the First, Fifth, Sixth, Seventh, and Eighth doctors, respectively. Sophie Aldred and Janet Fielding also starred in the episode, reprising their roles as Ace and Tegan Jovanka. Walsh briefly returned in the episode as well, with William Russell, Katy Manning, and Bonnie Langford portraying former companions Ian Chesterton, Jo Grant, and Mel Bush. With his appearance, Chesterson broke the Guinness World Record for "longest gap between TV appearances as the same character" with over 57 years since his last appearance in 1965.

On 8 May 2022, Ncuti Gatwa was cast as the Fourteenth Doctor. David Tennant and Catherine Tate were also announced to be returning to the series in a similar set of specials airing in 2023 to commemorate the 60th anniversary of the series. Following Tennant's re-introduction to the series at the end of "The Power of the Doctor" it was revealed that Gatwa would actually be playing the Fifteenth Doctor while Tennant would hold the role of the Fourteenth. Bernard Cribbins appeared in the 2023 specials as Wilfred Mott in a posthumous role because of Cribbins' death after completing filming. Langford also reprised her role once more in the final special, "The Giggle". Gatwa was first introduced in this episode, before his first full episode in the 2023 Christmas special, with the fourteenth series screening in 2024. This series is also set to see Langford make further guest appearances. In May 2024, it was revealed that Nicola Coughlan would star as the Doctor's one-off companion in the 2024 Christmas special. Gatwa and Gibson continued their roles into the fifteenth series, joined by Varada Sethu, who first appeared in the episode "Boom" (2024) as an unrelated character. They departed at the end of "The Reality War".

Actor	Character		Appearances										
Actor	Character		Series 11 (2018)	Special (2019)	Series 12 (2020)	Special (2021)	Series 13 (2021)	Specials (2022)	Specials (2023)	Special (2023)	Series 14 (2024)	Special (2024)	Series 15 (2025)
Jodie Whittaker	The Doctor	Thirteenth	Main	Main	Main	Main	Main	Main					Guest
Jo Martin	The Doctor	Fugitive			Guest		Guest	Guest					Guest
David Bradley	The Doctor	First						Guest					
Peter Davison	The Doctor	Fifth						Guest					
Colin Baker	The Doctor	Sixth						Guest					
Sylvester McCoy	The Doctor	Seventh						Guest					
Paul McGann	The Doctor	Eighth						Guest					
David Tennant	The Doctor	Fourteenth						Guest	Main				
Ncuti Gatwa	The Doctor	Fifteenth							Guest	Main	Main	Main	Main
Bradley Walsh	Graham O'Brien	Graham O'Brien	Main	Main	Main	Main		Guest					
Tosin Cole	Ryan Sinclair	Ryan Sinclair	Main	Main	Main	Main							
Mandip Gill	Yasmin Khan	Yasmin Khan	Main	Main	Main	Main	Main	Main					
Sacha Dhawan	The Master	The Master			Recurring			Guest					
John Barrowman	Jack Harkness	Jack Harkness			Guest	Main							
John Bishop	Dan Lewis	Dan Lewis					Main	Main					
Nicholas Courtney	The Brigadier	The Brigadier					Voice only						
Sophie Aldred	Ace	Ace						Main					
Janet Fielding	Tegan Jovanka	Tegan Jovanka						Main					
William Russell	Ian Chesterton	Ian Chesterton						Guest					
Katy Manning	Jo Grant	Jo Grant						Guest					
Bonnie Langford	Mel Bush	Mel Bush						Guest	Guest		Guest		Guest
Catherine Tate	Donna Noble	Donna Noble							Main				
Bernard Cribbins	Wilfred Mott	Wilfred Mott							Guest				
Millie Gibson	Ruby Sunday	Ruby Sunday								Main	Main	Guest	Main
Nicola Coughlan	Joy Almondo	Joy Almondo										Main	
Varada Sethu	Belinda Chandra	Belinda Chandra											Main
Carole Ann Ford	Susan Foreman	Susan Foreman											Guest
Billie Piper	TBA	TBA											Guest

== Recurring appearances ==
Actors with roles which they have reprised over multiple episodes or stories without being part of the main cast.

=== A ===
Actor	Role	Stories
Chris Addison	Seb	"The Caretaker" (2014)
Chris Addison	Seb	"Dark Water" / "Death in Heaven" (2014)
Ronke Adekoluejo	Penny	"Extremis" – "The Pyramid at the End of the World" (2017)
Nadia Albina	Diane	"The Halloween Apocalypse" (2021)
Nadia Albina	Diane	"Once, Upon Time" (2021)
Nadia Albina	Diane	"Survivors of the Flux" – "The Vanquishers" (2021)
Nadia Albina	Diane	"Legend of the Sea Devils" (2022)
Jacob Anderson	Vinder	"The Halloween Apocalypse" – "The Vanquishers" (2021)
Jacob Anderson	Vinder	"The Power of the Doctor" (2022)
Samuel Anderson	Danny Pink	"Into the Dalek" (2014)
Samuel Anderson	Danny Pink	"Listen" – "Last Christmas (2014)
Adjoa Andoh	Francine Jones	"Smith and Jones" (2007)
Adjoa Andoh	Francine Jones	"The Lazarus Experiment" – "42" (2007)
Adjoa Andoh	Francine Jones	"The Sound of Drums" / "Last of the Time Lords" (2007)
Adjoa Andoh	Francine Jones	"The Stolen Earth" / "Journey's End" (2008)

=== B ===
Actor	Role	Stories
Annette Badland	Margaret Blaine	"Aliens of London" / "World War Three" (2005)
Annette Badland	Margaret Blaine	"Boom Town" (2005)
David Banks	Cyberleader	Earthshock (1982)
David Banks	Cyberleader	"The Five Doctors" (1983)
David Banks	Cyberleader	Attack of the Cybermen (1985)
David Banks	Cyberleader	Silver Nemesis (1988)
Frances Barber	Madame Kovarian	"Day of the Moon" – "The Curse of the Black Spot" (2011)
Frances Barber	Madame Kovarian	"The Rebel Flesh" – "A Good Man Goes to War" (2011)
Frances Barber	Madame Kovarian	"Closing Time" – "The Wedding of River Song" (2011)
Aneurin Barnard	Roger ap Gwilliam	"73 Yards" (2024)
Aneurin Barnard	Roger ap Gwilliam	"Empire of Death" (2024)
Tim Bentinck	Voice of the Monks	"Extremis" – "The Pyramid at the End of the World" (2017)
Nigel Betts	Mr Armitage	"Into the Dalek" (2014)
Nigel Betts	Mr Armitage	"The Caretaker" (2014)
Nigel Betts	Mr Armitage	"Dark Water" (2014)
Caitlin Blackwood	Amelia Pond	"The Eleventh Hour" (2010)
Caitlin Blackwood	Amelia Pond	"The Big Bang" (2010)
Caitlin Blackwood	Amelia Pond	"Let's Kill Hitler" (2011)
Caitlin Blackwood	Amelia Pond	"The God Complex" (2011)
Julian Bleach	Davros	"The Stolen Earth" / "Journey's End" (2008)
Julian Bleach	Davros	"The Magician's Apprentice" / "The Witch's Familiar" (2015)
Ken Bones	The General	"The Day of the Doctor" (2013)
Ken Bones	The General	"Hell Bent" (2015)
Hugh Bonneville	Henry Avery	"The Curse of the Black Spot" (2011)
Hugh Bonneville	Henry Avery	"A Good Man Goes to War" (2011)
Nicholas Briggs	Voice of the Daleks	"Dalek" (2005)
Nicholas Briggs	Voice of the Daleks	"Bad Wolf" / "The Parting of the Ways" (2005)
Nicholas Briggs	Voice of the Daleks	"Army of Ghosts" / "Doomsday" (2006)
Nicholas Briggs	Voice of the Daleks	"Daleks in Manhattan" / "Evolution of the Daleks" (2007)
Nicholas Briggs	Voice of the Daleks	"The Stolen Earth" / "Journey's End" (2008)
Nicholas Briggs	Voice of the Daleks	"Victory of the Daleks" (2010)
Nicholas Briggs	Voice of the Daleks	"The Pandorica Opens" / "The Big Bang" (2010)
Nicholas Briggs	Voice of the Daleks	"The Wedding of River Song" (2011)
Nicholas Briggs	Voice of the Daleks	"Asylum of the Daleks" (2012)
Nicholas Briggs	Voice of the Daleks	"The Day of the Doctor" – "The Time of the Doctor" (2013)
Nicholas Briggs	Voice of the Daleks	"Into the Dalek" (2014)
Nicholas Briggs	Voice of the Daleks	"The Magician's Apprentice" / "The Witch's Familiar" (2015)
Nicholas Briggs	Voice of the Daleks	"Hell Bent" (2015)
Nicholas Briggs	Voice of the Daleks	"The Pilot" (2017)
Nicholas Briggs	Voice of the Daleks	"Twice Upon a Time" (2017)
Nicholas Briggs	Voice of the Daleks	"Resolution" (2019)
Nicholas Briggs	Voice of the Daleks	"Revolution of the Daleks" (2021)
Nicholas Briggs	Voice of the Daleks	"The Vanquishers" (2021)
Nicholas Briggs	Voice of the Daleks	"Eve of the Daleks" (2022)
Nicholas Briggs	Voice of the Daleks	"The Power of the Doctor" (2022)
Nicholas Briggs	Voice of the Daleks	"The Reality War" (2025)
Nicholas Briggs	Voice of the Cybermen	"Rise of the Cybermen" / "The Age of Steel" (2006)
Nicholas Briggs	Voice of the Cybermen	"Army of Ghosts" / "Doomsday" (2006)
Nicholas Briggs	Voice of the Cybermen	"The Next Doctor" (2008)
Nicholas Briggs	Voice of the Cybermen	"A Good Man Goes to War" (2011)
Nicholas Briggs	Voice of the Cybermen	"Closing Time" (2011)
Nicholas Briggs	Voice of the Cybermen	"Nightmare in Silver" (2013)
Nicholas Briggs	Voice of the Cybermen	"Dark Water" / "Death in Heaven" (2014)
Nicholas Briggs	Voice of the Cybermen	"World Enough and Time" / "The Doctor Falls" (2017)
Nicholas Briggs	Voice of the Cybermen	"Ascension of the Cybermen" / "The Timeless Children" (2020)
Nicholas Briggs	Voice of the Cybermen	"Once, Upon Time" (2021)
Nicholas Briggs	Voice of the Cybermen	"The Vanquishers" (2021)
Nicholas Briggs	Voice of the Cybermen	"The Power of the Doctor" (2022)
Nicholas Briggs	Voice of the Judoon	"Smith and Jones" (2007)
Nicholas Briggs	Voice of the Judoon	"The Stolen Earth" (2008)
Nicholas Briggs	Voice of the Judoon	"Fugitive of the Judoon" (2020)
Nicholas Briggs	Voice of the Judoon	"The Timeless Children" (2020)
Nicholas Briggs	Voice of the Zygons	"The Day of the Doctor" (2013)
Nicholas Briggs	Voice of the Zygons	"The Zygon Invasion" / "The Zygon Inversion" (2015)
Nicholas Briggs	Voice of the Vlinx	"The Giggle" (2023)
Nicholas Briggs	Voice of the Vlinx	"The Legend of Ruby Sunday" / "Empire of Death" (2024)
Nicholas Briggs	Voice of the Vlinx	"Lucky Day" (2025)
Nicholas Briggs	Voice of the Vlinx	"The Reality War" (2025)
Nicholas Briggs	Voice of the Missbelindachandrabots	"The Robot Revolution" (2025)
Nicholas Briggs	Voice of the Omega	"The Reality War" (2025)
Peter Butterworth	The Meddling Monk	The Time Meddler (1965)
Peter Butterworth	The Meddling Monk	The Daleks' Master Plan (1966)

=== C ===
Actor	Role	Stories
Simon Callow	Charles Dickens	"The Unquiet Dead" (2005)
Simon Callow	Charles Dickens	"The Wedding of River Song" (2011)
Simon Carew	Ood	"Survivors of the Flux" – "The Vanquishers" (2021)
Lachele Carl	Trinity Wells	"Aliens of London" / "World War Three" (2005)
Lachele Carl	Trinity Wells	"The Christmas Invasion" (2005)
Lachele Carl	Trinity Wells	"The Sound of Drums" (2007)
Lachele Carl	Trinity Wells	"The Poison Sky" (2008)
Lachele Carl	Trinity Wells	"Turn Left" – "The Stolen Earth" (2008)
Lachele Carl	Trinity Wells	"The End of Time" (2009–2010)
Lachele Carl	Trinity Wells	"The Giggle" (2023)
Lachele Carl	Trinity Wells	"Lucky Day" (2025)
Silas Carson	Voice of the Ood	"The Impossible Planet" / "The Satan Pit" (2006)
Silas Carson	Voice of the Ood	"Planet of the Ood" (2008)
Silas Carson	Voice of the Ood	"The End of Time" (2009–2010)
Silas Carson	Voice of the Ood	"Survivors of the Flux" – "The Vanquishers" (2021)
Ysanne Churchman	Voice of Alpha Centauri	The Curse of Peladon (1972)
Ysanne Churchman	Voice of Alpha Centauri	The Monster of Peladon (1974)
Ysanne Churchman	Voice of Alpha Centauri	"Empress of Mars" (2017)
Noel Clarke	Mickey Smith	"Rose" (2005)
Noel Clarke	Mickey Smith	"Aliens of London" / "World War Three" (2005)
Noel Clarke	Mickey Smith	"Boom Town" (2005)
Noel Clarke	Mickey Smith	"The Parting of the Ways" (2005) – "New Earth" (2006)
Noel Clarke	Mickey Smith	"School Reunion" – "The Age of Steel" (2006)
Noel Clarke	Mickey Smith	"Army of Ghosts" / "Doomsday" (2006)
Noel Clarke	Mickey Smith	"Journey's End" (2008)
Noel Clarke	Mickey Smith	"The End of Time" (2010)
Sharon D. Clarke	Grace O'Brien	"The Woman Who Fell to Earth" (2018)
Sharon D. Clarke	Grace O'Brien	"Arachnids in the UK" (2018)
Sharon D. Clarke	Grace O'Brien	"It Takes You Away" (2018)
Sharon D. Clarke	Grace O'Brien	"Can You Hear Me?" (2020)
Sharon D. Clarke	Grace O'Brien	"Revolution of the Daleks" (2021)
Maurice Colbourne	Lytton	Resurrection of the Daleks (1984)
Maurice Colbourne	Lytton	Attack of the Cybermen (1985)
Camille Coduri	Jackie Tyler	"Rose" – "The End of the World" (2005)
Camille Coduri	Jackie Tyler	"Aliens of London" / "World War Three" (2005)
Camille Coduri	Jackie Tyler	"Father's Day" (2005)
Camille Coduri	Jackie Tyler	"The Parting of the Ways" (2005) – "New Earth" (2006)
Camille Coduri	Jackie Tyler	"Rise of the Cybermen" / "The Age of Steel" (2006)
Camille Coduri	Jackie Tyler	"Love & Monsters" (2006)
Camille Coduri	Jackie Tyler	"Army of Ghosts" / "Doomsday" (2006)
Camille Coduri	Jackie Tyler	"Journey's End" (2008)
Camille Coduri	Jackie Tyler	"The End of Time" (2010)
Karl Collins	Shaun Temple	"The End of Time" (2009–2010)
Karl Collins	Shaun Temple	"The Star Beast" (2023)
Karl Collins	Shaun Temple	"The Giggle" (2023)
Aidan Cook	Zygon	"The Day of the Doctor" (2013)
Aidan Cook	Zygon	"The Zygon Invasion" / "The Zygon Inversion" (2015)
James Corden	Craig Owens	"The Lodger" (2010)
James Corden	Craig Owens	"Closing Time" (2011)
Tony Curran	Vincent van Gogh	"Vincent and the Doctor" (2010)
Tony Curran	Vincent van Gogh	"The Pandorica Opens" (2010)

=== D ===
Actor	Role	Stories
Eve De Leon Allen	Angie Maitland	"The Bells of Saint John" (2013)
Eve De Leon Allen	Angie Maitland	"The Crimson Horror" – "The Name of the Doctor" (2013)
Steph de Whalley	Anita Benn	"Joy to the World" (2024)
Steph de Whalley	Anita Benn	"The Reality War" (2025)
Alexander Devrient	Colonel Christofer Ibrahim	"The Giggle" (2023)
Alexander Devrient	Colonel Christofer Ibrahim	"The Legend of Ruby Sunday" / "Empire of Death" (2024)
Alexander Devrient	Colonel Christofer Ibrahim	"Lucky Day" (2025)
Alexander Devrient	Colonel Christofer Ibrahim	"Wish World" / "The Reality War" (2025)
Richard Dillane	Carter	"Let's Kill Hitler" (2011)
Richard Dillane	Carter	"The Wedding of River Song" (2011)
Shaun Dingwall	Pete Tyler	"Father's Day" (2005)
Shaun Dingwall	Pete Tyler	"Rise of the Cybermen" / "The Age of Steel" (2006)
Shaun Dingwall	Pete Tyler	"Doomsday" (2006)
Jonny Dixon	Karl	"The Woman Who Fell to Earth" (2018)
Jonny Dixon	Karl	"Eve of the Daleks" (2022)
Anita Dobson	Mrs Flood	"The Church on Ruby Road" (2023)
Anita Dobson	Mrs Flood	"73 Yards" (2024)
Anita Dobson	Mrs Flood	"The Legend of Ruby Sunday" / "Empire of Death" (2024)
Anita Dobson	Mrs Flood	"The Robot Revolution" – "The Reality War" (2025)
Valentine Dyall	The Black Guardian	The Armageddon Factor (1979)
Valentine Dyall	The Black Guardian	Mawdryn Undead – Enlightenment (1983)

=== E ===
Actor	Role	Stories
Barnaby Edwards	Dalek Operator	"Dalek" (2005)
Barnaby Edwards	Dalek Operator	"Bad Wolf" / "The Parting of the Ways" (2005)
Barnaby Edwards	Dalek Operator	"Army of Ghosts" / "Doomsday (2006)
Barnaby Edwards	Dalek Operator	"Daleks in Manhattan" / "Evolution of the Daleks" (2007)
Barnaby Edwards	Dalek Operator	"The Stolen Earth" / "Journey's End" (2008)
Barnaby Edwards	Dalek Operator	"Victory of the Daleks" (2010)
Barnaby Edwards	Dalek Operator	"The Pandorica Opens" / "The Big Bang" (2010)
Barnaby Edwards	Dalek Operator	"The Magician's Apprentice" / "The Witch's Familiar" (2015)
Barnaby Edwards	Dalek Operator	"Revolution of the Daleks" (2021)
Barnaby Edwards	Dalek Operator	"Eve of the Daleks" (2022)
Barnaby Edwards	Dalek Operator	"The Power of the Doctor" (2022)
Craige Els	Karvanista	"The Halloween Apocalypse" – "Once, Upon Time" (2021)
Craige Els	Karvanista	"Survivors of the Flux" – "The Vanquishers" (2021)

=== F ===
Actor	Role	Stories
Stuart Fell	Body of Alpha Centauri	The Curse of Peladon (1972)
Stuart Fell	Body of Alpha Centauri	The Monster of Peladon (1974)
Simon Fisher-Becker	Dorium Maldovar	"The Pandorica Opens" (2010)
Simon Fisher-Becker	Dorium Maldovar	"A Good Man Goes to War" (2011)
Simon Fisher-Becker	Dorium Maldovar	"The Wedding of River Song" (2011)
Yasmin Finney	Rose Noble	"The Star Beast" (2023)
Yasmin Finney	Rose Noble	"The Giggle" (2023)
Yasmin Finney	Rose Noble	"The Legend of Ruby Sunday" / "Empire of Death" (2024)
Yasmin Finney	Rose Noble	"The Reality War" (2025)
Barbara Flynn	Awsok/Tecteun	"Once, Upon Time" (2021)
Barbara Flynn	Awsok/Tecteun	"Survivors of the Flux" (2021)

=== G ===
Actor	Role	Stories
Ravin J Ganatra	Hakim Khan	"Arachnids in the UK" (2018)
Ravin J Ganatra	Hakim Khan	"Demons of the Punjab" (2018)
Ravin J Ganatra	Hakim Khan	"Spyfall" (2020)
Ellis George	Courtney Woods	"Deep Breath" – "Into the Dalek" (2014)
Ellis George	Courtney Woods	"The Caretaker" – "Kill the Moon" (2014)
David Graham	Voice of the Daleks	The Daleks (1963–1964)
David Graham	Voice of the Daleks	The Dalek Invasion of Earth (1964)
David Graham	Voice of the Daleks	The Chase (1965)
David Graham	Voice of the Daleks	"Mission to the Unknown" (1965)
David Graham	Voice of the Daleks	The Daleks' Master Plan (1965–1966)
Thaddea Graham	Bel	"Once, Upon Time" − "The Vanquishers" (2021)
Richard E. Grant	Doctor Simeon / The Great Intelligence	"The Snowmen" (2012)
Richard E. Grant	Doctor Simeon / The Great Intelligence	"The Bells of Saint John" (2013)
Richard E. Grant	Doctor Simeon / The Great Intelligence	"The Name of the Doctor (2013)
Jaye Griffiths	Jac	"The Magician's Apprentice" (2015)
Jaye Griffiths	Jac	"The Zygon Invasion" (2015)
Michelle Greenidge	Carla Sunday	"The Church on Ruby Road" (2023)
Michelle Greenidge	Carla Sunday	"Space Babies" (2024)
Michelle Greenidge	Carla Sunday	"73 Yards" (2024)
Michelle Greenidge	Carla Sunday	"Rogue" – "Empire of Death" (2024)
Michelle Greenidge	Carla Sunday	"Lucky Day" (2025)
Michelle Greenidge	Carla Sunday	"Wish World" / "The Reality War" (2025)
Jonathan Groff	Rogue	"Rogue" (2024)
Jonathan Groff	Rogue	"Wish World" (2025)
Shobna Gulati	Najia Khan	"Arachnids in the UK" (2018)
Shobna Gulati	Najia Khan	"Demons of the Punjab" (2018)
Shobna Gulati	Najia Khan	"Spyfall" (2020)

=== H ===
Actor	Role	Stories
Daisy Haggard	Sophie	"The Lodger" (2010)
Daisy Haggard	Sophie	"Closing Time" (2011)
Jonah Hauer-King	Conrad Clark	"Lucky Day" (2025)
Jonah Hauer-King	Conrad Clark	"Wish World" (2025) / "The Reality War" (2025)
Peter Hawkins	Voice of the Daleks	The Daleks (1963)
Peter Hawkins	Voice of the Daleks	The Dalek Invasion of Earth (1964)
Peter Hawkins	Voice of the Daleks	The Space Museum (1965)
Peter Hawkins	Voice of the Daleks	The Chase (1965)
Peter Hawkins	Voice of the Daleks	Mission to the Unknown (1965)
Peter Hawkins	Voice of the Daleks	The Daleks' Master Plan (1965–1966)
Peter Hawkins	Voice of the Daleks	The Power of the Daleks (1966)
Peter Hawkins	Voice of the Daleks	The Evil of the Daleks (1967)
Peter Hawkins	Voice of the Cybermen	The Tenth Planet (1966)
Peter Hawkins	Voice of the Cybermen	The Moonbase (1967)
Peter Hawkins	Voice of the Cybermen	The Tomb of the Cybermen (1967)
Peter Hawkins	Voice of the Cybermen	The Wheel in Space (1968)
Andrew Hayden-Smith	Jake Simmonds	"Rise of the Cybermen" / "The Age of Steel" (2006)
Andrew Hayden-Smith	Jake Simmonds	"Doomsday" (2006)
Jennifer Hennessy	Moira	"The Pilot" (2017)
Jennifer Hennessy	Moira	"Extremis" (2017)
Clare Higgins	Ohila	"The Magician's Apprentice" (2015)
Clare Higgins	Ohila	"Hell Bent" (2015)
Jamie Hill	Monks	"Extremis" – "The Lie of the Land" (2017)
Richard Hope	Malohkeh	"The Hungry Earth" / "Cold Blood" (2010)
Richard Hope	Malohkeh	"The Wedding of River Song" (2011)
Kelly Hunter	Shadow Architect	"The Stolen Earth" (2008)
Kelly Hunter	Shadow Architect	"The Magician's Apprentice" (2015)
Stephanie Hyam	Heather	"The Pilot" (2017)
Stephanie Hyam	Heather	"The Doctor Falls" (2017)

=== J ===
Actor	Role	Stories
Barry Jackson	Jeff Garvey	Galaxy 4 (1965)
Barry Jackson	Jeff Garvey	"Mission to the Unknown" (1965)
Paul Jerricho	The Castellan	Arc of Infinity (1983)
Paul Jerricho	The Castellan	"The Five Doctors" (1983)
Robert Jewell	Dalek Operator	The Daleks (1963–1964)
Robert Jewell	Dalek Operator	The Dalek Invasion of Earth (1964)
Robert Jewell	Dalek Operator	The Chase (1965)
Robert Jewell	Dalek Operator	"Mission to the Unknown" (1965)
Robert Jewell	Dalek Operator	The Daleks' Master Plan (1965–1966)
Robert Jewell	Dalek Operator	The Power of the Daleks (1966)
Robert Jewell	Dalek Operator	The Evil of the Daleks (1967)
Kassius Carey Johnson	Artie Maitland	"The Bells of Saint John" (2013)
Kassius Carey Johnson	Artie Maitland	"The Crimson Horror" – "The Name of the Doctor" (2013)

=== K ===
Actor	Role	Stories
Paul Kasey	Cybermen	"Rise of the Cybermen" / "The Age of Steel" (2006)
Paul Kasey	Cybermen	"Army of Ghosts" / "Doomsday" (2006)
Paul Kasey	Cybermen	"The Next Doctor" (2008)
Paul Kasey	Cybermen	"Closing Time" (2011)
Paul Kasey	Ood	"The Impossible Planet" / "The Satan Pit" (2006)
Paul Kasey	Ood	"Planet of the Ood" (2008)
Paul Kasey	Ood	"Waters of Mars" (2009)
Paul Kasey	Ood	"The End of Time" (2009–2010)
Paul Kasey	Judoon	"Smith and Jones" (2007)
Paul Kasey	Judoon	"The Stolen Earth" (2008)
Paul Kasey	Judoon	"The Pandorica Opens" (2010)
Paul Kasey	Judoon	"Fugitive of the Judoon" (2020)
Paul Kasey	It Has No Name	"The Well" (2025)
Asif Khan	Sgt. Ramesh Sunder	"The Woman Who Fell to Earth" (2018)
Asif Khan	Sgt. Ramesh Sunder	"Spyfall" (2020)
Jacqueline King	Sylvia Noble	"The Runaway Bride" (2006)
Jacqueline King	Sylvia Noble	"Partners in Crime" (2008)
Jacqueline King	Sylvia Noble	"The Sontaran Stratagem" / "The Poison Sky" (2008)
Jacqueline King	Sylvia Noble	"Turn Left" – "Journey's End" (2008)
Jacqueline King	Sylvia Noble	"The End of Time" (2009–2010)
Jacqueline King	Sylvia Noble	"The Star Beast" (2023)
Jacqueline King	Sylvia Noble	"The Giggle" (2023)
Tommy Knight	Luke Smith	"The Stolen Earth" / "Journey's End" (2008)
Tommy Knight	Luke Smith	"The End of Time" (2010)

=== L ===
Actor	Role	Stories
Trevor Laird	Clive Jones	"Smith and Jones" (2007)
Trevor Laird	Clive Jones	"The Sound of Drums" / "Last of the Time Lords" (2007)
Bruno Langley	Adam Mitchell	"Dalek" – "The Long Game" (2005)
Oscar Lloyd	Toby Avery	"The Curse of the Black Spot" (2011)
Oscar Lloyd	Toby Avery	"A Good Man Goes to War" (2011)

=== M ===
Actor	Role	Stories
Ruth Madeley	Shirley Bingham	"The Star Beast" (2023)
Ruth Madeley	Shirley Bingham	"The Giggle" (2023)
Ruth Madeley	Shirley Bingham	"Lucky Day" (2025)
Ruth Madeley	Shirley Bingham	"Wish World" / "The Reality War" (2025)
Kevin Manser	Dalek Operator	The Daleks (1963–1964)
Kevin Manser	Dalek Operator	The Dalek Invasion of Earth (1964)
Kevin Manser	Dalek Operator	The Chase (1965)
Kevin Manser	Dalek Operator	"Mission to the Unknown" (1965)
Kevin Manser	Dalek Operator	The Daleks' Master Plan (1965–1966)
Kevin Manser	Dalek Operator	The Power of the Daleks (1966)
Fernanda Marlowe	Corporal Bell	The Mind of Evil (1971)
Fernanda Marlowe	Corporal Bell	The Claws of Axos (1971)
Sienna-Robyn Mavanga-Phipps	Poppy	"Space Babies" (2024)
Sienna-Robyn Mavanga-Phipps	Poppy	"The Story & the Engine" (2025)
Sienna-Robyn Mavanga-Phipps	Poppy	"Wish World" / "The Reality War" (2025)
Gugu Mbatha-Raw	Tish Jones	"Smith and Jones" (2007)
Gugu Mbatha-Raw	Tish Jones	"The Lazarus Experiment" (2007)
Gugu Mbatha-Raw	Tish Jones	"The Sound of Drums" / "Last of the Time Lords" (2007)
Neve McIntosh	Madame Vastra	"A Good Man Goes to War" (2011)
Neve McIntosh	Madame Vastra	"The Snowmen" (2012)
Neve McIntosh	Madame Vastra	"The Crimson Horror" (2013)
Neve McIntosh	Madame Vastra	"The Name of the Doctor" (2013)
Neve McIntosh	Madame Vastra	"Deep Breath" (2014)
Faye McKeever	Louise Miller	"Empire of Death" (2024)
Faye McKeever	Louise Miller	"Lucky Day" (2025)
Kevin McNally	Professor Jericho	"Village of the Angels" – "The Vanquishers" (2021)
Ian McNeice	Winston Churchill	"The Beast Below" − "Victory of the Daleks" (2010)
Ian McNeice	Winston Churchill	"The Pandorica Opens" (2010)
Ian McNeice	Winston Churchill	"The Wedding of River Song" (2011)
Brian Miller	Dalek voices	Resurrection of the Daleks (1984)
Brian Miller	Dalek voices	Remembrance of the Daleks (1988)
Alexandra Moen	Lucy Saxon	"The Sound of Drums" / "Last of the Time Lords" (2007)
Alexandra Moen	Lucy Saxon	"The End of Time" (2009)
Terry Molloy	Davros	Resurrection of the Daleks (1984)
Terry Molloy	Davros	Revelation of the Daleks (1985)
Terry Molloy	Davros	Remembrance of the Daleks (1988)

=== N ===
Actor	Role	Stories
Matthew Needham	Old Swarm	"The Halloween Apocalypse" (2021)
Matthew Needham	Old Swarm	"Once, Upon Time" (2021)
Chris Noth	Jack Robertson	"Arachnids in the UK" (2018)
Chris Noth	Jack Robertson	"Revolution of the Daleks" (2021)

=== O ===
Actor	Role	Stories
Samuel Oatley	Tim Shaw	"The Woman Who Fell to Earth" (2018)
Samuel Oatley	Tim Shaw	"The Battle of Ranskoor Av Kolos" (2018)
Patrick O'Kane	Ashad	"The Haunting of Villa Diodati" – "The Timeless Children" (2020)
Patrick O'Kane	Ashad	"The Power of the Doctor" (2022)
Sophie Okonedo	Liz 10	"The Beast Below" (2010)
Sophie Okonedo	Liz 10	"The Pandorica Opens" (2010)
Ingrid Oliver	Osgood	"The Day of the Doctor" (2013)
Ingrid Oliver	Osgood	"Death in Heaven" (2014)
Ingrid Oliver	Osgood	"The Zygon Invasion" / "The Zygon Inversion" (2015)
Kate O'Mara	The Rani	The Mark of the Rani (1985)
Kate O'Mara	The Rani	Time and the Rani (1987)
Steve Oram	Joseph Williamson	"The Halloween Apocalypse" – "Once, Upon Time" (2021)
Steve Oram	Joseph Williamson	"Survivors of the Flux" – "The Vanquishers" (2021)

=== P ===
Actor	Role	Stories
Archie Panjabi	The Rani	"The Interstellar Song Contest" – "The Reality War" (2025)
Craig Parkinson	Grand Serpent	"Once, Upon Time" (2021)
Craig Parkinson	Grand Serpent	"Survivors of the Flux" – "The Vanquishers" (2021)
Bhavnisha Parmar	Sonya Khan	"Arachnids in the UK" (2018)
Bhavnisha Parmar	Sonya Khan	"Demons of the Punjab" (2018)
Bhavnisha Parmar	Sonya Khan	"Spyfall" (2020)
Bhavnisha Parmar	Sonya Khan	"Can You Hear Me?" (2020)
Bhavnisha Parmar	Sonya Khan	"Once, Upon Time" (2021)
Bill Paterson	Professor Edwin Bracewell	"Victory of the Daleks" (2010)
Bill Paterson	Professor Edwin Bracewell	"The Pandorica Opens" (2010)
Nicholas Pegg	Dalek Operator	"Bad Wolf" / "The Parting of the Ways" (2005)
Nicholas Pegg	Dalek Operator	"Army of Ghosts" / "Doomsday" (2006)
Nicholas Pegg	Dalek Operator	"Daleks in Manhattan" / "Evolution of the Daleks" (2007)
Nicholas Pegg	Dalek Operator	"The Stolen Earth" / "Journey's End" (2008)
Nicholas Pegg	Dalek Operator	"Victory of the Daleks" (2010)
Nicholas Pegg	Dalek Operator	"Asylum of the Daleks" (2012)
Nicholas Pegg	Dalek Operator	"The Day of the Doctor" – "The Time of the Doctor" (2013)
Nicholas Pegg	Dalek Operator	"The Magician's Apprentice" / "The Witch's Familiar" (2015)
Nicholas Pegg	Dalek Operator	"Revolution of the Daleks" (2021)
Nicholas Pegg	Dalek Operator	"Eve of the Daleks" (2022)
Nicholas Pegg	Dalek Operator	"The Power of the Doctor" (2022)

=== R ===
Actor	Role	Stories
Jemma Redgrave	Kate Lethbridge-Stewart	"The Power of Three" (2012)
Jemma Redgrave	Kate Lethbridge-Stewart	"The Day of the Doctor" (2013)
Jemma Redgrave	Kate Lethbridge-Stewart	"Death in Heaven" (2014)
Jemma Redgrave	Kate Lethbridge-Stewart	"The Magician's Apprentice" (2015)
Jemma Redgrave	Kate Lethbridge-Stewart	"The Zygon Invasion" / "The Zygon Inversion" (2015)
Jemma Redgrave	Kate Lethbridge-Stewart	"Survivors of the Flux" – "The Vanquishers" (2021)
Jemma Redgrave	Kate Lethbridge-Stewart	"The Power of the Doctor" (2022)
Jemma Redgrave	Kate Lethbridge-Stewart	"The Giggle" (2023)
Jemma Redgrave	Kate Lethbridge-Stewart	"73 Yards" (2024)
Jemma Redgrave	Kate Lethbridge-Stewart	"The Legend of Ruby Sunday" / "Empire of Death" (2024)
Jemma Redgrave	Kate Lethbridge-Stewart	"Lucky Day" (2025)
Jemma Redgrave	Kate Lethbridge-Stewart	"Wish World" / "The Reality War" (2025)
Sheila Reid	Clara's Gran	"The Time of the Doctor" (2013)
Sheila Reid	Clara's Gran	"Dark Water" (2014)
Struan Rodger	Voice of Face of Boe	"New Earth" (2006)
Struan Rodger	Voice of Face of Boe	"Gridlock" (2007)
Lenny Rush	Morris Gibbons	"The Legend of Ruby Sunday" / "Empire of Death" (2024)

=== S ===
Actor	Role	Stories
Rochenda Sandall	Azure	"The Halloween Apocalypse" – "The Vanquishers" (2021)
Annabel Scholey	Claire Brown	"The Halloween Apocalypse" (2021)
Annabel Scholey	Claire Brown	"Village of the Angels" (2021)
Annabel Scholey	Claire Brown	"The Vanquishers" (2021)
Tony Selby	Glitz	The Mysterious Planet (1986)
Tony Selby	Glitz	The Ultimate Foe (1986)
Tony Selby	Glitz	Dragonfire (1987)
Nabil Shaban	Sil	Vengeance on Varos (1985)
Nabil Shaban	Sil	Mindwarp (1986)
W. Morgan Sheppard	Old Canton Delaware	"The Impossible Astronaut" (2011)
W. Morgan Sheppard	Old Canton Delaware	"The Wedding of River Song" (2011)
Roy Skelton	Voice of the Cybermen	The Tenth Planet (1966)
Roy Skelton	Voice of the Cybermen	The Wheel in Space (1968)
Roy Skelton	Voice of the Daleks	The Evil of the Daleks (1967)
Roy Skelton	Voice of the Daleks	Genesis of the Daleks (1975)
Roy Skelton	Voice of the Daleks	Planet of the Daleks (1973)
Roy Skelton	Voice of the Daleks	"The Five Doctors" (1983)
Roy Skelton	Voice of the Daleks	Revelation of the Daleks (1985)
Roy Skelton	Voice of the Daleks	Remembrance of the Daleks (1988)
Sam Spruell	Swarm	"The Halloween Apocalypse" – "Once, Upon Time" (2021)
Sam Spruell	Swarm	"Survivors of the Flux" – "The Vanquishers" (2021)
Dan Starkey	Sontaran	"The Sontaran Stratagem" / "The Poison Sky" (2008)
Dan Starkey	Sontaran	"The End of Time" (2010)
Dan Starkey	Sontaran	"The Time of the Doctor" (2013)
Dan Starkey	Sontaran	"The Halloween Apocalypse" – "War of the Sontarans" (2021)
Dan Starkey	Sontaran	"The Vanquishers" (2021)
Dan Starkey	Strax	"A Good Man Goes to War" (2011)
Dan Starkey	Strax	"The Snowmen" (2012)
Dan Starkey	Strax	"The Crimson Horror" (2013)
Dan Starkey	Strax	"The Name of the Doctor" (2013)
Dan Starkey	Strax	"Deep Breath" (2014)
Catrin Stewart	Jenny Flint	"A Good Man Goes to War" (2011)
Catrin Stewart	Jenny Flint	"The Snowmen" (2012)
Catrin Stewart	Jenny Flint	"The Crimson Horror" (2013)
Catrin Stewart	Jenny Flint	"The Name of the Doctor" (2013)
Catrin Stewart	Jenny Flint	"Deep Breath" (2014)

=== T ===
Actor	Role	Stories
Buom Tihngang	Tibo	"Spyfall" (2020)
Buom Tihngang	Tibo	"Can You Hear Me?" (2020)
Russell Tovey	Alonso Frame	"Voyage of the Damned" (2007)
Russell Tovey	Alonso Frame	"The End of Time" (2010)
Cy Town	Dalek Operator	Frontier in Space (1973)
Cy Town	Dalek Operator	Planet of the Daleks (1973)
Cy Town	Dalek Operator	Death to the Daleks (1974)
Cy Town	Dalek Operator	Genesis of the Daleks (1975)
Cy Town	Dalek Operator	Destiny of the Daleks (1979)
Cy Town	Dalek Operator	Resurrection of the Daleks (1984)
Cy Town	Dalek Operator	Revelation of the Daleks (1985)
Cy Town	Dalek Operator	Remembrance of the Daleks (1988)
Susan Twist	Mrs Merridew	"Wild Blue Yonder" (2023)
Susan Twist	Woman	"The Church on Ruby Road" (2023)
Susan Twist	Gina Scalzi	"Space Babies" (2024)
Susan Twist	Tea Lady	"The Devil's Chord" (2024)
Susan Twist	Villengard Ambulance AI	"Boom" (2024)
Susan Twist	Hiker	"73 Yards" (2024)
Susan Twist	Penny Pepper-Bean	"Dot and Bubble" (2024)
Susan Twist	The Portrait	"Rogue" (2024)
Susan Twist	Susan Triad	"The Legend of Ruby Sunday" / "Empire of Death" (2024)
Susan Twist	Susan Triad	"Wish World" / "The Reality War" (2025)

=== V ===
Actor	Role	Stories
Marnix van den Broeke	Silent	"The Impossible Astronaut" / "Day of the Moon" (2011)
Marnix van den Broeke	Silent	"Closing Time" – "The Wedding of River Song" (2011)

=== W ===
Actor	Role	Stories
Joivan Wade	Rigsy	"Flatline" (2014)
Joivan Wade	Rigsy	"Face the Raven" (2015)
Everal A. Walsh	Gabriel	"The Woman Who Fell to Earth" (2018)
Everal A. Walsh	Gabriel	"Can You Hear Me?" (2020)
Zoë Wanamaker	Lady Cassandra	"The End of the World" (2005)
Zoë Wanamaker	Lady Cassandra	"New Earth" (2006)
Edmund Warwick	Stand-in for William Hartnell	The Keys of Marinus (1964)
Edmund Warwick	Stand-in for William Hartnell	The Dalek Invasion of Earth (1964)
Jack Watling	Professor Edward Travers	The Abominable Snowmen (1967)
Jack Watling	Professor Edward Travers	The Web of Fear (1968)
Jonathan Watson	Skaak/Sontaran Commander Riskaw	"The Halloween Apocalypse" – "War of the Sontarans" (2021)
Jonathan Watson	Sontaran Commander Stenck	"Survivors of the Flux" (2021)
Maisie Williams	Ashildr	"The Girl Who Died" – "The Woman Who Lived" (2015)
Maisie Williams	Ashildr	"Face the Raven" (2015)
Maisie Williams	Ashildr	"Hell Bent" (2015)
Mark Williams	Brian Williams	"Dinosaurs on a Spaceship" (2012)
Mark Williams	Brian Williams	"The Power of Three" (2012)
Penelope Wilton	Harriet Jones	"Aliens of London" / "World War Three" (2005)
Penelope Wilton	Harriet Jones	"The Christmas Invasion" (2005)
Penelope Wilton	Harriet Jones	"The Stolen Earth" (2008)
Michael Wisher	Dalek voices	Frontier in Space (1973)
Michael Wisher	Dalek voices	Planet of the Daleks (1973)
Michael Wisher	Dalek voices	Death to the Daleks (1974)
Gabriel Woolf	Sutekh	Pyramids of Mars (1975)
Gabriel Woolf	Sutekh	"The Legend of Ruby Sunday" / "Empire of Death" (2024)
Gabriel Woolf	Voice of The Beast	"The Impossible Planet" / "The Satan Pit" (2006)
Angela Wynter	Cherry Sunday	"The Church on Ruby Road" (2023)
Angela Wynter	Cherry Sunday	"Space Babies" (2024)
Angela Wynter	Cherry Sunday	"73 Yards" (2024)
Angela Wynter	Cherry Sunday	"The Legend of Ruby Sunday" / "Empire of Death" (2024)
Angela Wynter	Cherry Sunday	"Lucky Day" (2025)
Angela Wynter	Cherry Sunday	"Wish World" / "The Reality War" (2025)

=== Y ===
Actor	Role	Stories
Reggie Yates	Leo Jones	"Smith and Jones" (2007)
Reggie Yates	Leo Jones	"The Lazarus Experiment" (2007)
Reggie Yates	Leo Jones	"The Sound of Drums" / "Last of the Time Lords" (2007)

== Guest appearances ==
This is a list of actors who have made guest appearances in Doctor Who. These actors were well-known names at the time of their appearance in the series, which frequently caused interest in the media towards the latest story. Actors who became famous after their Doctor Who appearance are not present in this list.

=== First Doctor ===
Actor	Role	Stories
Max Adrian	King Priam	The Myth Makers (1965)
Robert Beatty	General Cutler	The Tenth Planet (1966)
Stephanie Bidmead	Maaga	Galaxy 4 (1965)
George Coulouris	Arbitan	The Keys of Marinus (1964)
Julian Glover	Richard the Lionheart	The Crusade (1965)
Michael Gough	Celestial Toymaker	The Celestial Toymaker (1966)
Barrie Ingham	Paris	The Myth Makers (1965)
Kenneth Kendall	Himself	The War Machines (1966)
Andre Morell	Marshal Tavannes	The Massacre (1966)

=== Second Doctor ===
Actor	Role	Stories
Bernard Bresslaw	Varga	The Ice Warriors (1967)
Pauline Collins OBE	Sam Briggs	The Faceless Ones (1967)
Joseph Furst	Zaroff	The Underwater Menace (1967)
Marius Goring, CBE	Theodore Maxtible	The Evil of the Daleks (1967)
Emrys Jones	The Master of the Land of Fiction	The Mind Robber (1968)
Esmond Knight	Dom Issigri	The Space Pirates (1969)
Ronald Leigh-Hunt	Radnor	The Seeds of Death (1969)
Victor Maddern	Robson	Fury from the Deep (1968)
Wolfe Morris	Padmasambhava and the Voice of the Great Intelligence	The Abominable Snowmen (1967)

=== Third Doctor ===
Actor	Role	Stories
June Brown	Lady Eleanor	The Time Warrior (1973–1974)
Ingrid Pitt	Queen Galleia	The Time Monster (1972)
Aubrey Woods	Controller	Day of the Daleks (1972)
Helen Worth	Mary Ashe	Colony in Space (1971)

=== Fourth Doctor ===
Actor	Role	Stories
George Baker	Login	Full Circle (1980)
Eleanor Bron	Art Gallery Visitor	City of Death (1979)
John Cleese	Art critic	City of Death (1979)
Adrienne Corri	Mena	The Leisure Hive (1980)
Julian Glover	Count/Scaroth	City of Death (1979)
Emrys James	Aukon	State of Decay (1980)
Beatrix Lehmann	Prof. Emilia Rumford	The Stones of Blood (1978)
Pamela Salem	Toos	The Robots of Death (1977)

=== Fifth Doctor ===
Actor	Role	Stories
Lynda Baron	Captain Wrack	Enlightenment (1983)
Isla Blair	Isabella	The King's Demons (1983)
Peter Gilmore	Brazen	Frontios (1984)
Leee John	Mansell	Enlightenment (1983)
Burt Kwouk	Lin Futu	Four to Doomsday (1982)
Ingrid Pitt	Dr Solow	Warriors of the Deep (1984)
Beryl Reid	Briggs	Earthshock (1982)
Richard Todd	Sanders	Kinda (1982)
Peter Wyngarde	Timanov	Planet of Fire (1984)

=== Sixth Doctor ===
Actor	Role	Stories
Terence Alexander	Lord Ravensworth	The Mark of the Rani (1985)
Honor Blackman	Professor Lasky	Terror of the Vervoids (1986)
Brian Blessed	Yrcanos	Mindwarp (1986)
Eleanor Bron	Kara	Revelation of the Daleks
Faith Brown	Flast	Attack of the Cybermen (1985)
Paul Darrow	Tekker	Timelash (1985)
Maurice Denham OBE	Azmael/Professor Edgeworth	The Twin Dilemma (1984)
Geoffrey Hughes	Popplewick	The Ultimate Foe (1986)
Martin Jarvis	The Governor	Vengeance on Varos (1985)
Jacqueline Pearce	Chessenne	The Two Doctors (1985)
Patrick Ryecart	Crozier	Mindwarp (1986)
Alexei Sayle	D.J.	Revelation of the Daleks (1985)
Joan Sims	Katryca	The Mysterious Planet (1986)

=== Seventh Doctor ===
Actor	Role	Stories
Richard Briers	Chief Caretaker	Paradise Towers (1987)
Ken Dodd	Tollmaster	Delta and the Bannermen (1987)
Dolores Gray	Mrs. Remington	Silver Nemesis (1988)
Hale and Pace	Len and Harvey	Survival (1989)
Sheila Hancock	Helen A	The Happiness Patrol (1988)
Nicholas Parsons	Rev. Wainwright	The Curse of Fenric (1989)
Pamela Salem	Professor Jensen	Remembrance of the Daleks (1988)
Sylvia Syms	Mrs Pritchard	Ghost Light (1989)

=== Eighth Doctor ===
Actor	Role	Stories
Eric Roberts	The Master	Doctor Who (1996)

=== Ninth Doctor ===
Actor	Role	Stories
Jo Joyner	Lynda Moss	"Bad Wolf" / "The Parting of the Ways" (2005)
Davina McCall	Davinadroid	"Bad Wolf" (2005)
Simon Pegg	The Editor	"The Long Game" (2005)
Anne Robinson	Anne Droid	"Bad Wolf" / "The Parting of the Ways" (2005)
Richard Wilson	Doctor Constantine	"The Empty Child" / "The Doctor Dances" (2005)

=== Tenth Doctor ===
Actor	Role	Stories
Derek Acorah	Himself	"Army of Ghosts" (2006)
Thelma Barlow	Lady Thaw	"The Lazarus Experiment" (2007)
Michelle Collins	Kath McDonell	"42" (2007)
Pauline Collins OBE	Queen Victoria	"Tooth and Claw" (2006)
Timothy Dalton	Rassilon	"The End of Time" (2009–2010)
Richard Dawkins	Himself	"The Stolen Earth" (2008)
Huw Edwards	Himself	"Fear Her" (2006)
Lee Evans	Malcolm Taylor	"Planet of the Dead" (2009)
Mark Gatiss	Professor Richard Lazarus	"The Lazarus Experiment" (2007)
Trisha Goddard	Herself	"Army of Ghosts" (2006)
Anthony Head	Mr Finch	"School Reunion" (2006)
Derek Jacobi	Professor Yana	"Utopia" (2007)
Peter Kay	Victor Kennedy	"Love & Monsters" (2006)
Felicity Kendal CBE	Lady Clemency Eddison	"The Unicorn and the Wasp" (2008)
Roger Lloyd-Pack	John Lumic	"Rise of the Cybermen" / "The Age of Steel" (2006)
Carey Mulligan	Sally Sparrow	"Blink" (2007)
Tracy-Ann Oberman	Yvonne Hartman	"Army of Ghosts" / "Doomsday" (2006)
Lesley Sharp	Sky Silvestry	"Midnight" (2008)
Marc Warren	Elton Pope	"Love & Monsters" (2006)

=== Eleventh Doctor ===
Actor	Role	Stories
Bill Bailey	Droxil	"The Doctor, the Widow and the Wardrobe" (2011)
Lynda Baron	Val	"Closing Time" (2011)
David Bradley	Solomon	"Dinosaurs on a Spaceship" (2012)
Brian Cox	Himself	"The Power of Three" (2012)
Michael Gambon	Kazran Sardick / Elliot Sardick	"A Christmas Carol" (2010)
Katherine Jenkins	Abigail Pettigrew	"A Christmas Carol" (2010)
Ian McKellen	Voice of the Great Intelligence	"The Snowmen" (2012)
David Mitchell	Voice of Robot 1	"Dinosaurs on a Spaceship" (2012)
Bill Nighy	Dr. Black	"Vincent and the Doctor" (2010)
David Walliams	Gibbis	"The God Complex" (2011)
Robert Webb	Voice of Robot 2	"Dinosaurs on a Spaceship" (2012)

=== Twelfth Doctor ===
Actor	Role	Stories
Greg Davies	King Hydroflax	"The Husbands of River Song" (2015)
Foxes	Singer	"Mummy on the Orient Express" (2014)
Frank Skinner	Perkins	"Mummy on the Orient Express" (2014)

=== Thirteenth Doctor ===
Actor	Role	Stories
Aisling Bea	Sarah	"Eve of the Daleks" (2022)
Alan Cumming	King James	"The Witchfinders" (2018)
Stephen Fry	C	"Spyfall" (2020)
Sir Lenny Henry	Daniel Barton	"Spyfall" (2020)
Julie Hesmondhalgh	Judy Maddox	"Kerblam!" (2018)
Lee Mack	Dan Cooper	"Kerblam!" (2018)
Art Malik	Ilin	"The Ghost Monument" (2018)
Pauline McLynn	Mary	"Eve of the Daleks" (2022)

=== Fourteenth Doctor ===
Actor	Role	Stories
Neil Patrick Harris	The Toymaker	"The Giggle" (2023)
Miriam Margolyes	Voice of The Meep	"The Star Beast" (2023)

=== Fifteenth Doctor ===
Actor	Role	Stories
Rylan Clark	Himself	"The Interstellar Song Contest" (2025)
Alan Cumming	Mr Ring-a-Ding	"Lux" (2025)
Davina McCall	Herself	"The Church on Ruby Road" (2023)
Jinkx Monsoon	Maestro	"The Devil's Chord" (2024)
Graham Norton	Himself	"The Interstellar Song Contest" (2025)

== See also ==
- Companion (Doctor Who)
