= Alastair King (composer) =

British composer and conductor (born 1967)

- Born: 1967 (age 58–59)
- Genres: Film score, Classical music
- Occupations: Conductor, Composer, Orchestrator

Alastair King (born 1967) is a British composer and conductor, perhaps best known for his musical contributions to film and television. He frequently collaborates with composers Charlie Mole, Geoff Zanelli, Nicholas Hooper and Rupert Gregson-Williams by either conducting for them or acting as an orchestrator or both.

== Biography ==
King studied music at Bath College of Higher Education, graduating in 1991. He then undertook postgraduate study at Birmingham University and the University of Kansas.

His work Hit the Ground (Running, Running, Running) was the only European entry in the final of the composing competition Masterprize 2001.

In addition to his concert works, King has composed music for various films, including Shrek, Chicken Run, and Harry Potter and the Half-Blood Prince and television programmes, including the FIFA World Cup 2002, The Last Detective, Second Nature and William and Mary.

King's most recent roles include conducting and orchestrating on Doctor Who for Murray Gold and Segun Akinola. He replaced Ben Foster after his departure in 2015 and took on the full role for Series 10. He left the show after the 2017 Christmas special Twice Upon a Time, then returned in 2021 for Series 13's The Vanquishers, the finale of the six-part Flux arc, as well as the final three specials of Jodie Whittaker's era as the Thirteenth Doctor in 2022.

== Filmography ==
Year	Title	Composer(s)	Notes
2001	Shrek	Harry Gregson-Williams; John Powell	Music Assistant
2002	Thunderpants	Rupert Gregson-Williams	Conductor and Orchestrator
2002	The Heart of Me	Nicholas Hooper	Conductor
2002	Plots with a View	Rupert Gregson-Williams	Conductor and Orchestrator
2003	What a Girl Wants	Rupert Gregson-Williams	Conductor and Orchestrator
2004	Agent Cody Banks 2: Destination London	Mark Thomas	Music Preparation
2004	King Arthur	Hans Zimmer	Music arranger: Choral
2004	Hotel Rwanda	Rupert Gregson-Williams	Additional score arranger
2005	The Magic Roundabout	Mark Thomas	Conductor: Choir
2005	Kingdom of Heaven	Harry Gregson-Williams	Orchestrator
2005	Guy X	Charlie Mole; Hilmar Örn Hilmarsson	Conductor and Orchestrator
2005	The Island	Steve Jablonsky	Conductor: Choir
2005	Spirit Trap	Guy Fletcher	Orchestrator
2005	Wallace & Gromit: The Curse of the Were-Rabbit	Julian Nott	Composer of Additional Music
2005	Blood Rayne	Henning Lohner	Conductor
2005	The Chronicles of Narnia: The Lion, the Witch and the Wardrobe	Harry Gregson-Williams	Conductor: Choir(uncredited)
2006	Goose on the Loose	Charlie Mole	Conductor and Orchestator
2006	Curious George	Heitor Pereira	Conductor and Orchestator
2006	Over the Hedge	Rupert Gregson-Williams	Conductor and Orchestator
2006	Pirates of the Caribbean: Dead Man's Chest	Hans Zimmer	Conductor: Choir
2006	Fade to Black	Charlie Mole	Conductor and Orchestrator
2007	Mr. Bean's Holiday	Howard Goodall	Orchestrator
2007	Harry Potter and the Order of the Phoenix	Nicholas Hooper	Conductor and Orchestrator
2007	Bee Movie	Rupert Gregson-Williams	Conductor and Orchestrator
2007	Fred Claus	Christophe Beck	Conductor
2007	St Trinian's	Charlie Mole	Orchestrator
2008	Made of Honor	Rupert Gregson-Williams	Conductor(uncredited) and Orchestrator
2008	You Don't Mess with the Zohan	Rupert Gregson-Williams	Conductor(uncredited) and Orchestrator
2008	Bedtime Stories	Rupert Gregson-Williams	Orchestrator
2009	The Maiden Heist	Rupert Gregson-Williams	Conductor and Orchestrator
2009	Harry Potter and the Half-Blood Prince	Nicholas Hooper	Conductor and Orchestrator
2009	Dorian Gray	Charlie Mole	Conductor and Orchestrator
2009	Harry Brown	Martin Phipps; Ruth Barrett; Pete Tong; Theo Green; Paul Rogers	Orchestrator
2009	St Trinian's 2: The Legend of Fritton's Gold	Charlie Mole	Conductor and Orchestrator
2010	Prince of Persia: The Sands of Time	Harry Gregson-Williams	Orchestrator(uncredited)
2010	Grown Ups	Rupert Gregson-Williams	Orchestrator
2011	Just Go with It	Rupert Gregson-Williams	Orchestrator
2011	Zookeeper	Rupert Gregson-Williams	Orchestrator
2011	Stella Days	Nicholas Hooper	Conductor and Orchestrator
2011	Beneath the Darkness	Geoff Zanelli	Conductor
2011	Jack and Jill	Rupert Gregson-Williams; Waddy Wachtel	Orchestrator
2012	Red Lights	Victor Reyes	Conductor
2012	Should've Been Romeo	Geoff Zanelli	Conductor and Orchestrator
2012	That's My Boy	Rupert Gregson-Williams	Orchestrator
2012	Total Recall	Harry Gregson-Williams	Orchestrator
2012	Song for Marion	Laura Rossi	Conductor and Orchestrator
2012	Here Comes the Boom	Rupert Gregson-Williams	Orchestrator
2013	Dead Man Down	Jacob Groth	Conductor and Orchestrator
2013	Grown Ups 2	Rupert Gregson-Williams	Orchestrator
2013	Gravity	Steven Price	Orchestrator(uncredited)
2014	Vampire Academy	Rolfe Kent	Orchestrator
2014	Winter's Tale	Hans Zimmer; Rupert Gregson-Williams	Orchestrator
2014	Blended	Rupert Gregson-Williams	Orchestrator
2014	Postman Pat: The Movie	Rupert Gregson-Williams	Conductor and Orchestrator
2014	Exodus: Gods and Kings	Alberto Iglesias	Orchestrator
2015	The Scorpion King 4: Quest for Power	Geoff Zanelli	Orchestrator
2015	Mortdecai	Geoff Zanelli; Mark Ronson	Conductor and Orchestrator
2015	Paul Blart: Mall Cop 2	Rupert Gregson-Williams	Orchestrator
2015	The Martian	Harry Gregson-Williams	Orchestrator
2015	The Ridiculous 6	Rupert Gregson-Williams; Elmo Webber	Orchestrator
2016	Dad's Army	Charlie Mole	Conductor and Orchestrator
2016	Altamira	Mark Knopfler; Evelyn Glennie	Orchestrator
2016	The Do-Over	Rupert Gregson-William	Orchestrator
2016	The Legend of Tarzan	Rupert Gregson-William	Conductor and Orchestrator
2016	Masterminds	Geoff Zanelli	Orchestrator
2016	Winter Thaw	Nicholas Hooper	Conductor and Orchestrator
2017	The Ottoman Lieutenant	Geoff Zanelli	Orchestrator
2017	Sandy Wexler	Rupert Gregson-Williams	Orchestrator
2017	Wonder Woman	Rupert Gregson-Williams	Conductor and Orchestrator
2018	Swimming with Men	Charlie Mole	Conductor and Orchestrator
2018	Skyscraper	Steve Jablonsky	Conductor
2018	The Meg	Harry Gregson-Williams	Orchestrator
2018	Aquaman	Rupert Gregson-Williams	Conductor and Orchestrator
2025	Mr Burton	John Hardy	Conductor
