= Eve of the Daleks =

298 – "Eve of the Daleks"
- Doctor Who episode
- Promotional poster

Cast
- Doctor: Jodie Whittaker – Thirteenth Doctor
- Companions: Mandip Gill – Yasmin Khan; John Bishop – Dan Lewis
- Others: Aisling Bea – Sarah; Adjani Salmon – Nick; Barnaby Edwards, Nicholas Pegg, Jon Davey – Dalek Operators; Nicholas Briggs – Voice of the Daleks; Pauline McLynn – Mary; Jonny Dixon – Karl

Production
- Directed by: Annetta Laufer
- Written by: Chris Chibnall
- Produced by: Sheena Bucktowonsing
- Executive producers: Chris Chibnall; Matt Strevens; Nikki Wilson
- Music by: Segun Akinola
- Series: 2022 specials
- Running time: 58 minutes
- First broadcast: 1 January 2022

Chronology
← Preceded by "The Vanquishers"	Followed by → "Legend of the Sea Devils"

"Eve of the Daleks" is the first of three special episodes that followed the thirteenth series of the British science fiction television programme Doctor Who. The episode was first broadcast on BBC One on 1 January 2022 as Doctor Who's annual holiday special. It was written by Chris Chibnall, and directed by Annetta Laufer. It is the third and final part of a loose trilogy that developed in previous festive specials.

In the episode, the Thirteenth Doctor (Jodie Whittaker) and her two companions, Yasmin Khan (Mandip Gill) and Dan Lewis (John Bishop), get trapped in a time loop on New Year's Eve. Once there, they find Sarah and Nick (guest stars Aisling Bea and Adjani Salmon) and the five are repeatedly chased by a Dalek.

"Eve of the Daleks" was filmed in Bristol in June 2021 and was impacted by COVID-19 in its production process. Described as a bottle episode and a romantic comedy, "Eve of the Daleks" received positive reviews and was viewed by 4.39 million. It was broadcast internationally.

== Plot ==
Shortly before midnight on New Year's Eve, Nick turns up at a storage facility in Manchester owned and operated by Sarah, on whom he has a crush. Meanwhile, the Doctor attempts to reset the TARDIS to remove the damage and anomalies caused by the Flux. Intending to spend time at a beach, she, Yaz, and Dan exit in the storage facility instead. Unbeknownst to the Doctor, the TARDIS' reset triggers a time loop.

Nick encounters an Executioner Dalek which kills him, and later the Doctor, Yaz, Dan, and Sarah. Time resets, with Sarah and Nick both trying to save the other, but failing and dying upon seeing the Dalek again. The Doctor realises that each reset shortens the time loop by one minute and speculates that the loop will collapse at midnight. The Daleks reveal they have detected the TARDIS' energy signature and have come to execute the Doctor for her actions in "The Vanquishers". Both the Doctor's group and the Daleks attempt to learn from the previous loops in order to anticipate their enemy's next moves. During the loops, Nick confesses returning each year to see Sarah while Dan points out to the Doctor that Yaz has romantic feelings for her.

Using illegal fireworks and other materials stored in the facility by another employee, the group decide to create a trap that will bring down the facility when fired upon. To prevent the Daleks from anticipating the move, they behave completely differently in the second-to-last loop, before dying again. At the last minute before midnight, they place the materials, along with Sarah's mobile phone, in the wrong place while escaping through the basement. Triggered by hearing Sarah's mother calling her phone, the Daleks shoot the trap and ignite the fireworks, which causes the facility to explode and bury the Daleks underneath.

The TARDIS finishes restructuring and the Doctor and her companions leave to find the lost treasure of the Flor de la Mar, while Sarah and Nick decide to travel the world together.

== Production ==
=== Development ===
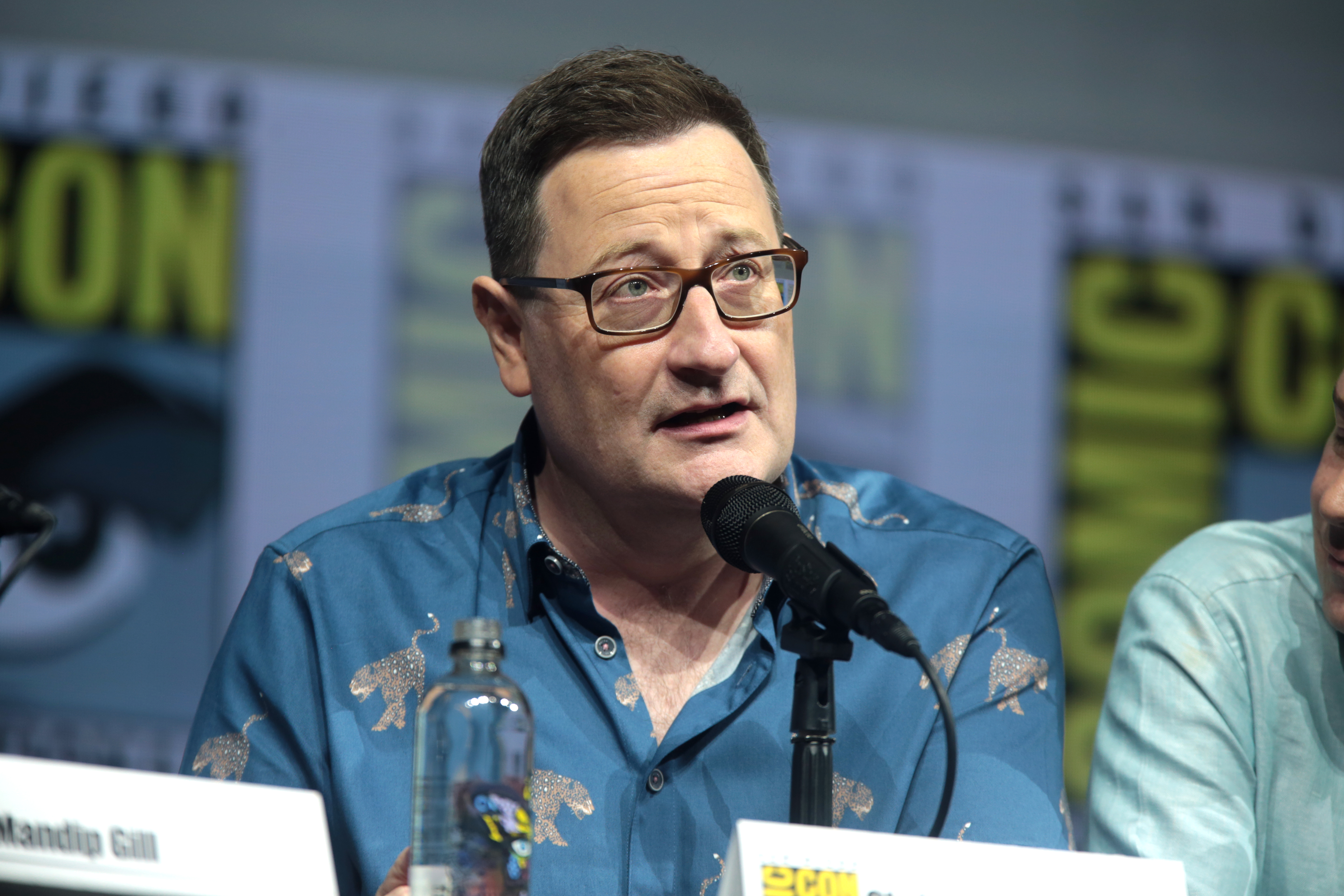
The episode was written by Doctor Who showrunner Chris Chibnall.

"Eve of the Daleks" was produced as one of eight episodes ordered for the thirteenth series of Doctor Who. Despite this, it stands alone from the six-part series. Along with the subsequent eighth episode and an additional episode that was ordered later, it is the first episode in a trio of specials. The episode was written by Chris Chibnall, the Doctor Who showrunner, as the annual Doctor Who festive episode. He wrote the episode in a little over two weeks after his original plans for the episode had to be modified due to production concerns and budgetary issues caused by the impact of COVID-19 on television. Described as a bottle episode, Chibnall deemed the episode, which utilises a time loop format, a romantic comedy.

It is only the second Doctor Who story to take place on New Year's Eve after the 1996 film. A read-through occurred on Zoom. The episode features the Daleks in the final part of a loosely connected trilogy of New Year's specials that began in "Resolution" and continued in "Revolution of the Daleks". Introduced in the episode are a new version of the Daleks, referred to as "Executioner Daleks". Their design is a modified version of their 2005 appearance and features a new weapons arm that caused them to be described as "deadlier than standard Daleks." At nine minutes and ten seconds long, the episode features the longest cold open of any Doctor Who episode, beating the previous longest cold open in "The Return of Doctor Mysterio" (2016).

=== Casting ===
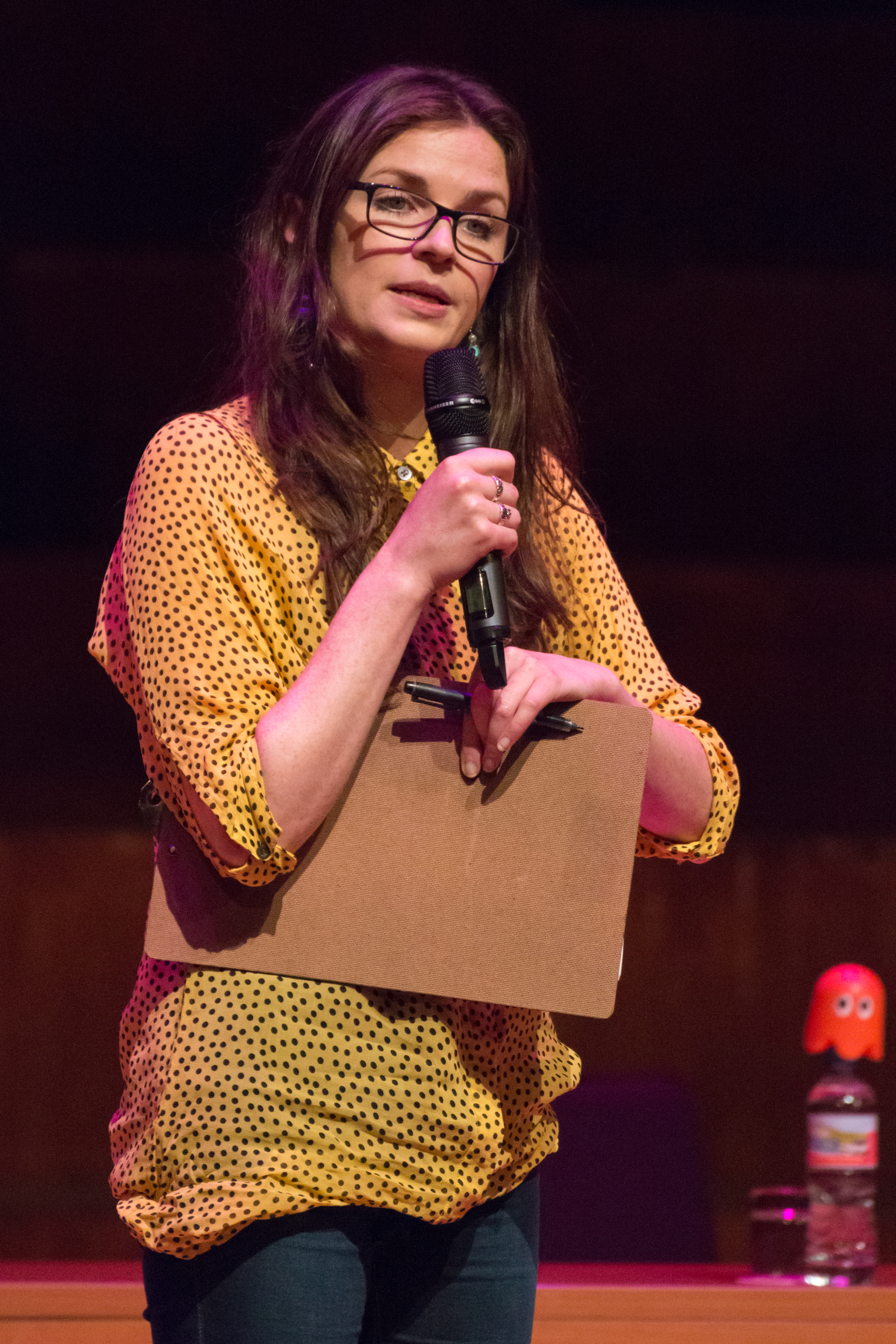
Aisling Bea made a guest appearance in the special as Sarah.

Jodie Whittaker stars in the episode as the thirteenth incarnation of the Doctor. Mandip Gill and John Bishop play her companions Yasmin Khan and Dan Lewis. Whittaker stated that when she first read the opening lines of the script, in which she gets exterminated by a Dalek, she thought she was being killed off earlier than she had expected. In November 2021, it was reported that Aisling Bea and Pauline McLynn would appear in the special.

The following month, the BBC announced that Bea would portray Sarah, the owner-operator of ELF, a self storage unit. Adjani Salmon appeared as Nick, a regular customer at ELF Storage. Chibnall later revealed that the role of Sarah was specifically created for Bea while casting Salmon was the idea of Rebecca Roughan, a script editor on the programme.

Nicholas Briggs voiced the Daleks, the props of which were operated by Barnaby Edwards, Nicholas Pegg, and Jon Davey. Jonny Dixon reprised his role as Karl Wright from "The Woman Who Fell To Earth" (2018) in a brief cameo near the end of the episode.

=== Filming ===
"Eve of the Daleks" was directed by Anetta Laufer. She was hired by producer Sheena Bucktowonsing who was impressed by a short film of Laufer's. Filming on the episode occurred in Bristol in June 2021. Robin Whenary was the episode's cinematographer. Laufer and Whenary collaborated on creative ways of framing the Daleks, using cinematic techniques to make them appear more intimidating. They utilised long shots, haze and smoke machines, and creative lighting methods to achieve this.

== Release and reception ==
Professional ratings
Aggregate scores
Source	Rating
Rotten Tomatoes (Tomatometer)	83%
Rotten Tomatoes (Average Score)	7.20/10
Metacritic	76/100
Review scores
Source	Rating
The A.V. Club	A−
Radio Times	4/5 stars
The Independent	4/5 stars
The Telegraph	4/5 stars
Evening Standard	4/5 stars

=== Broadcast and home media ===
When planning Doctor Who's thirteenth series, two specials were set to be held for 2022. It was later reported that "Eve of the Daleks" would air on BBC One on 1 January 2022 as a New Year's Day special. The episode was simulcast on BBC America in the United States with an additional broadcast later in the day. It also aired on CTV Sci-Fi Channel in Canada on 1 January as well as on ABC Television and ABC TV Plus in Australia on 2 January.

"Eve of the Daleks" and "Legend of the Sea Devils" received a joint DVD and Blu-ray release in Region 2/B on 23 May 2022, in Region 1/A on 28 June 2022, and in Region 4/B on 13 July 2022. The episode was included in the home media set for the 2022 specials, released in Region 2/B on 7 November 2022.

On 18 November 2022, composer Segun Akinola announced that selected pieces of the score from this special would be digitally released on 2 December 2022. A physical CD release containing all 3 soundtracks of the 2022 specials was released on 13 January 2023.

=== Ratings ===
The episode was watched by 3.21 million viewers overnight, becoming the sixth most-watched programme of the day. The episode received an Audience Appreciation Index score of 77. Within seven days the total number of viewers rose to 4.40 million, ranking as the 27th most viewed programme for the week. In the United States, the simulcast was seen by 422,000, while the later broadcast was viewed by 251,000.

=== Critical response ===
On the review aggregator website Rotten Tomatoes, 83% of 12 critics' reviews are positive, with an average rating of 7.20/10. The website's consensus reads: "Doctor Who scales back and is all the better for it with a New Year's special that finds fresh notes within a self-contained yarn." Metacritic, which uses a weighted average, assigned the film a score of 76 out of 100, based on 6 critics, indicating "generally favorable" reviews. Reviewing the episode for The A.V. Club, Caroline Siede opined that "Eve of the Daleks" was one of the best episodes under Chibnall, particularly praising the guest cast and use of storytelling. Patrick Mulkern from Radio Times wrote that the romance tones were far better than the comedy ones, despite the strong comedy backgrounds of Bea and Salmon.

The Daily Telegraph's Michael Hogan wrote about the change in format from a normal time loop, stating that the loop getting shorter each time "cleverly cranked up the jeopardy as proceedings built to a combustible climax." Writing for The Independent, Isobel Lewis said the bottle episode format allowed for better character development with both the main and guest characters, mentioning that such development was absent from the thirteenth series. Tom Nicholson's review for The Evening Standard criticised the pacing of the episode, with Nicholson stating "after a tight first half hour, the show loses a little urgency for a while until the finale clicks into place".
