= The Vanquishers =

297f – "The Vanquishers"
- Doctor Who episode

Cast
- Doctor: Jodie Whittaker – Thirteenth Doctor
- Companions: Mandip Gill – Yasmin Khan; John Bishop – Dan Lewis
- Others: Sam Spruell – Swarm; Rochenda Sandall – Azure; Steve Oram – Williamson; Kevin McNally – Professor Jericho; Craige Els – Karvanista; Thaddea Graham – Bel; Jemma Redgrave – Kate Stewart; Jonathan Watson – Sontaran Commander Stenck; Craig Parkinson – Grand Serpent; Dan Starkey – Senstarg/Shallo/Kragar; Annabel Scholey – Claire Brown; Jacob Anderson – Vinder; Nadia Albina – Diane; Simon Carew – Ood; Silas Carson – Voice of the Ood; Jonny Mathers – Passenger; Sonny Walker – Stevie; Nicholas Briggs – Voice of the Daleks/Cybermen

Production
- Directed by: Azhur Saleem
- Written by: Chris Chibnall
- Script editor: Caroline Buckley; Rebecca Roughan
- Produced by: Pete Levy
- Executive producers: Chris Chibnall; Matt Strevens; Nikki Wilson
- Music by: Segun Akinola
- Series: Series 13
- Running time: 6th of 6-part story, 59 minutes
- First broadcast: 5 December 2021

Chronology
← Preceded by "Survivors of the Flux"	Followed by → "Eve of the Daleks"

"The Vanquishers", prefixed frequently with either "Chapter Six" or "Flux", is the sixth and final episode of the thirteenth series of the British science fiction television programme Doctor Who, and of the six-episode serial known collectively as Doctor Who: Flux. It was first broadcast on BBC One on 5 December 2021. It was written by showrunner and executive producer Chris Chibnall, and directed by Azhur Saleem.

The episode stars Jodie Whittaker as the Thirteenth Doctor, alongside Mandip Gill and John Bishop as her companions, Yasmin Khan and Dan Lewis, respectively.

== Plot ==
The Doctor runs from Swarm, taking Tecteun's Ood with her. Swarm and Azure advance on her but the Doctor takes off her conversion plate and, as Swarm touches her, is split into three copies among the Division spacecraft, Bel's ship, and the Liverpool tunnels.

On the Division spacecraft, Azure attempts to return the Doctor's missing memories to her using the fob watch. The Doctor refuses to see them. Azure reveals her intent to engineer the Flux into a time loop of universal destruction. The Ood attempts to slow down the Flux.

In the Passenger, Vinder and Diane disrupt its internal systems and escape into another unknown environment. Yaz, Dan, Jericho, and Williamson take out the Sontaran vanguard with lightning from a tunnel door before traveling to 2021 through another. They meet Kate Stewart who is leading a resistance against the invasion. The Doctor bargains for Claire and Jericho to help them find the final Flux event's coordinates. She takes her TARDIS from Kate.

The Doctor crashes Bel's ship into the Sontaran command headquarters. They are stopped by a force field, captured, and placed on a Sontaran ship. Karvanista reveals that during the Doctor's time in the Division, he was her companion. He cannot say more about it, under threat of a Division poison implant in his brain. The Sontarans remove the Doctor and inform Karvanista of the Lupari's extinction.

The Doctor piloting the TARDIS frees her copy from the Grand Serpent's torture device and aims it at him. Bel downloads Sontaran transmissions offering alliance with the Cybermen and Daleks, a ruse to sacrifice them to the Flux while the Lupari shield ensconces the Sontarans. Claire escapes the ship. Jericho cannot. The Doctor rescues Vinder and Diane, and reforms the Lupari shield behind the Sontarans, leaving the Flux to consume the Sontarans, Daleks and Cybermen, as well as Jericho. The Doctor uses the Passenger, a repository of endless matter, to absorb the Flux.

Azure and Swarm bring the Doctor to Atropos to sacrifice her to Time, but since the Flux failed to free Time, Time destroys them. Time lets the Doctor go but warns of her end before reunifying her. In the tunnels, Kate and Vinder maroon the Serpent on a small asteroid through a door. Vinder and Bel decide to travel with Karvanista. Dan invites Diane on a date, but Diane refuses. The Doctor invites Dan to join her and Yaz on their travels. She then apologises to Yaz for not letting her in on her plan, and promises to tell her everything that has happened to her since they visited Gallifrey. The Doctor then deposits her fob watch deep into the TARDIS interior for safekeeping.

== Production ==
=== Development ===
"The Vanquishers" was written by showrunner and executive producer Chris Chibnall.

=== Casting ===
The series is the third to feature Jodie Whittaker as the Thirteenth Doctor, and Mandip Gill as Yasmin Khan, with John Bishop having joined the cast for the series as Daniel Lewis.

=== Filming ===
Azhur Saleem directed the second block, which comprised the third, fifth, and sixth episodes of the series.

== Broadcast and reception ==
Professional ratings
Aggregate scores
Source	Rating
Rotten Tomatoes (Tomatometer)	40%
Rotten Tomatoes (Average Score)	5/10
Review scores
Source	Rating
The A.V. Club	B−
Radio Times	4/5 stars
The Independent	3/5 stars
The Telegraph	2/5 stars

=== Broadcast ===
"The Vanquishers" aired on 5 December 2021. The episode serves as the final part of a six-part story, entitled Flux. In the United States the episode aired on BBC America.

=== Ratings ===
The episode was watched by 3.58 million viewers overnight. The seven-day consolidated rating (counting all views across all platforms within seven days of broadcast) was 4.64 million. The episode was the sixth-highest rated programme on BBC1 for the week, and the 26th-highest programme across all channels for the week.

=== Critical reception ===
Martin Belam of The Guardian called The Vanquishers "a decent episode that ended what was the best, most consistent season of the Whittaker era." Louise Griffin for the Metro gave the episode three stars out of five, describing it as "a finale that’s enjoyable but [which] feels like it’s frantically trying to tie up loose ends as efficiently as possible." Isobel Lewis for The Independent also gave the episode three stars out of five, writing that "Flux has revelled in its own confusion, but while some bits in the middle feel like a hazy blur (the less said about episode three, the better), the pay-off is largely satisfying." Patrick Mulkern of the Radio Times gave the episode four stars out of five, describing the story as having "resolved satisfyingly" in an episode in which "everything but the kitchen sink, the dog basket and the loo brush was being chucked into the mix."
