= The Woman Who Fell to Earth =

277 – "The Woman Who Fell to Earth"
- Doctor Who episode

Cast
- Doctor: Jodie Whittaker – Thirteenth Doctor
- Companions: Bradley Walsh – Graham O'Brien; Tosin Cole – Ryan Sinclair; Mandip Gill – Yasmin Khan
- Others: Sharon D. Clarke – Grace; Samuel Oatley – Tim Shaw; Johnny Dixon – Karl; Amit Shah – Rahul; Asha Kingsley – Sonia; Janine Mellor – Janey; Asif Khan – Ramesh Sunder; James Thackeray – Andy; Philip Abiodun – Dean; Stephen MacKenna – Dennis; Everal A Walsh – Gabriel

Production
- Directed by: Jamie Childs
- Written by: Chris Chibnall
- Produced by: Nikki Wilson
- Executive producers: Chris Chibnall; Matt Strevens; Sam Hoyle
- Music by: Segun Akinola
- Series: Series 11
- Running time: 64 minutes
- First broadcast: 7 October 2018

Chronology
← Preceded by "Twice Upon a Time"	Followed by → "The Ghost Monument"

"The Woman Who Fell to Earth" is the first episode of the eleventh series and the 845th episode overall of the British science fiction television programme Doctor Who. It was written by new head writer and executive producer Chris Chibnall, directed by Jamie Childs, and was first broadcast on BBC One on 7 October 2018. It stars Jodie Whittaker in her first full appearance as the Thirteenth Doctor, and introduces the Doctor's new companions – Bradley Walsh as Graham O'Brien, Tosin Cole as Ryan Sinclair, and Mandip Gill as Yasmin Khan. The episode also guest stars Sharon D. Clarke, Johnny Dixon, and Samuel Oatley.

The story focuses on a group of people who come across a new alien threat in Sheffield and find themselves banding together with the recently regenerated Doctor, who has been separated from her time machine the TARDIS since the events of "Twice Upon a Time". As they seek to understand the threat, they find themselves in danger as well, and they discover that the recently arrived aliens are planning a hunt upon a single human, leading the Doctor to co-ordinate an attempt to save everyone from danger.

It is the first episode to be led by Chibnall, alongside executive producers Matt Strevens and Sam Hoyle, after Steven Moffat and Brian Minchin stepped down at the conclusion of the tenth series, and marks the third era of production in the revived series, following Russell T Davies' tenure as executive producer from 2005 to 2010 and Moffat's from 2010 to 2017. It is both the first regular episode of the revived era to be broadcast on Sunday, instead of Saturday, alongside subsequent episodes in the series, and the second episode (the first being "Sleep No More") not to feature any opening titles or credits. Since its first broadcast in the UK, the episode has received positive reviews from critics, as well as a rating of 10.96 million viewers, the highest series premiere for a debuting Doctor in the history of the programme and the highest consolidated ratings since "The Time of the Doctor" (2013).

== Plot ==
Ryan Sinclair, a dyspraxic youth, calls the police after causing a blue pod to appear while retrieving his bike. After showing the pod to PC Yasmin Khan, his old school friend, Ryan receives a call from his grandmother, Grace, learning that she and her husband Graham O'Brien, along with a crane operator named Karl, are trapped on board their train by a floating orb of electric tentacles. Ryan and Yasmin reach the train just as the newly regenerated Doctor falls through the carriage ceiling. The orb departs after zapping the group with an energy bolt. Karl leaves while the others remain with the Doctor, who is suffering partial post-regeneration amnesia while discovering they have all been implanted with DNA-destroying bombs.

The search for the orb brings the group to a warehouse whose owner acquired the pod, linking it to his sister's disappearance, and they arrive just after the man was killed by an alien that emerged from the pod. The Doctor, assuming the two aliens are mortal enemies, tinkers with the pod and builds a replacement sonic screwdriver from spare parts before the group finds and subdues the orb. The orb is revealed to be a mass of biological data-gathering coils with data on Karl. The second alien appears, introducing himself as Tzim-Sha of the warlike Stenza who came to Earth for a ritualistic hunt for leadership. Though a furious Doctor (addressing him as "Tim Shaw") demands that Tzim-Sha and his people leave Earth alone, he downloads the coils' data before teleporting to Karl's location at a construction yard.

After the group is unsuccessful in preventing Tzim-Sha from capturing Karl, the Doctor fully recalls her identity and confronts Tzim-Sha. Ordering him to release the human, she threatens to destroy his recall device and strand the Stenza on Earth should he refuse. Tzim-Sha responds by detonating the DNA bombs, but the Doctor reveals that she transferred them back into the coils, which the Stenza unknowingly self-implanted while downloading its data. As the Doctor throws the recall device at Tzim-Sha to return him to his planet, Grace dies as the result of falling from the crane while destroying the coils. Following Grace's funeral and a change of clothing, the Doctor builds a teleporter to reach the TARDIS. She bids the others farewell, only to inadvertently bring them with her into deep space.

== Production ==
=== Development ===
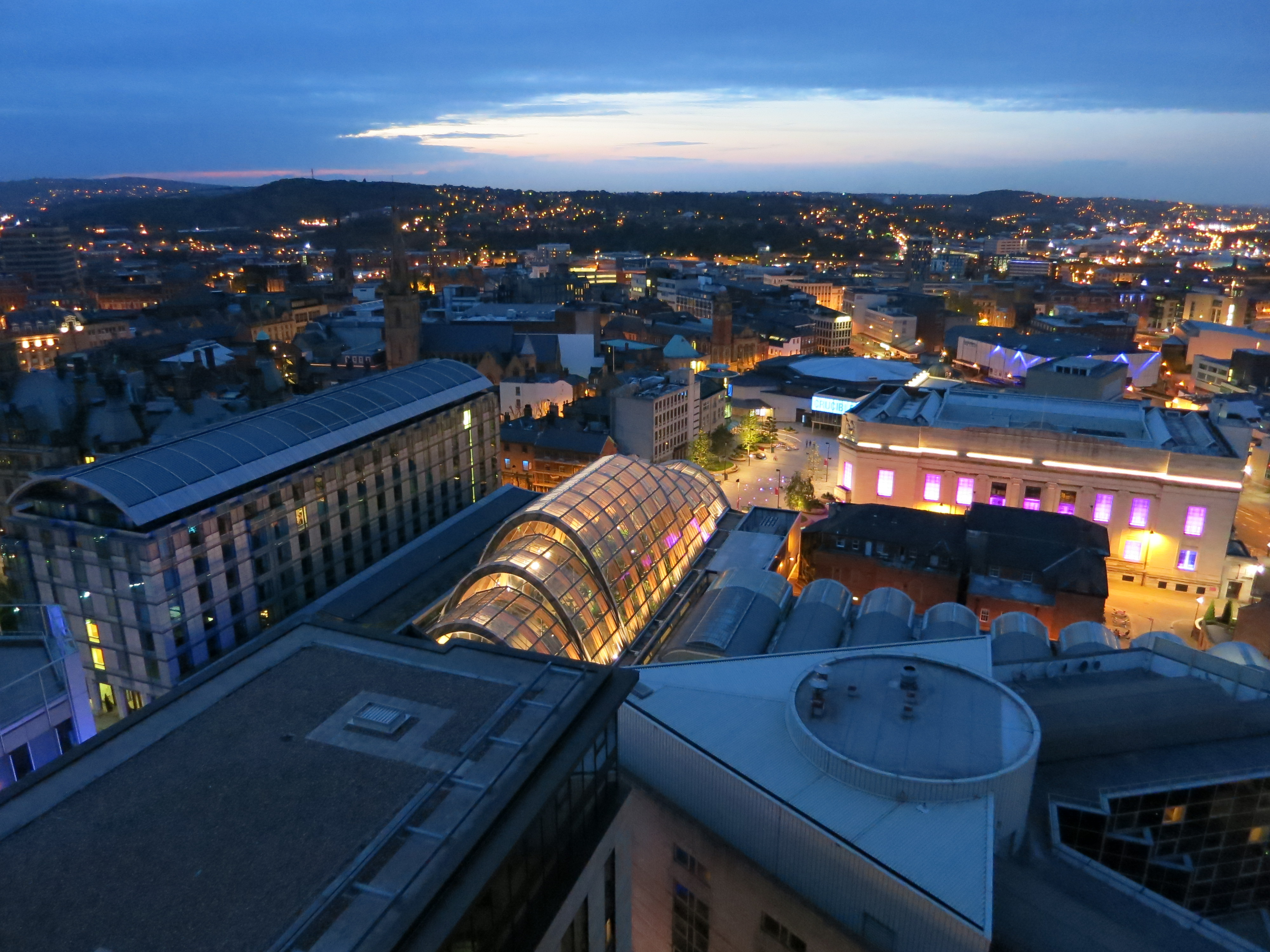
The Doctor lands in Sheffield, the principal setting for the episode.

It was announced in January 2016 that the tenth series would be Steven Moffat's final series as executive producer and head writer, after seven years as showrunner, for which he was replaced in the role by Chris Chibnall in 2018. Matt Strevens served as executive producer alongside Chibnall, as well as Sam Hoyle.

A new logo was unveiled at the BBC Worldwide showcase on 20 February 2018. This logo was designed by the creative agency Little Hawk, who also created a stylized insignia of the word "who" enclosed in a circle with an intersecting line, typically used for social media accounts. Murray Gold announced in February 2018 that he would step down as the programme's composer, having served as the musical director since 2005, and that he would not be composing the music for the eleventh series. On 26 June 2018, producer Chris Chibnall announced that the musical score for the eleventh series would be provided by Royal Birmingham Conservatoire alumnus Segun Akinola.

=== Casting ===
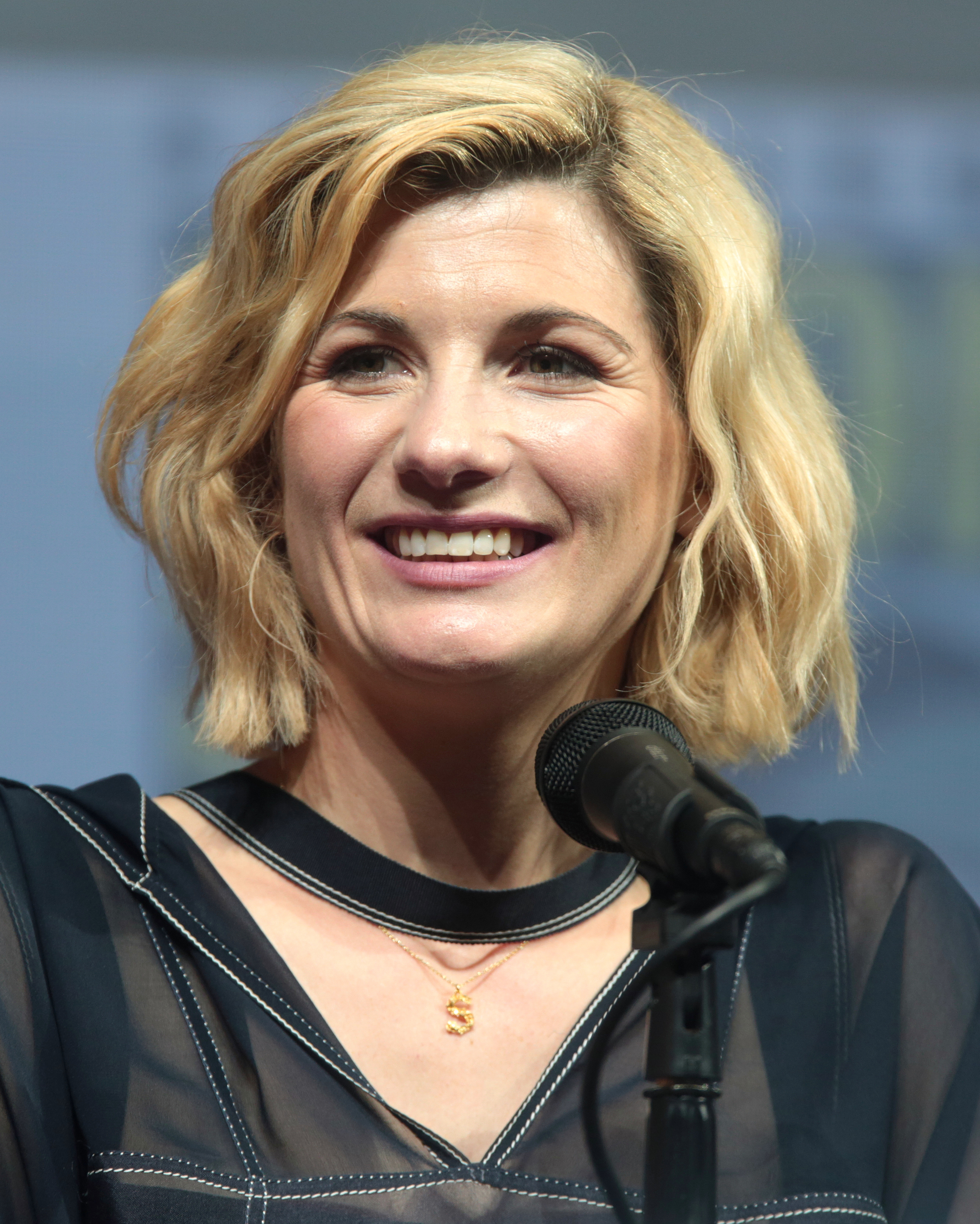
Whittaker at the 2018 San Diego Comic-Con, where she promoted her first full series.

The episode introduced Jodie Whittaker as the Thirteenth Doctor. Her predecessor Peter Capaldi departed from his role as the Twelfth Doctor after the tenth series, having played the role for three series. His final appearance was in the 2017 Christmas special, "Twice Upon a Time". Moffat stated in February 2017 that Chibnall tried unsuccessfully to persuade Capaldi to continue into the eleventh series.

The search for the actor to portray the Thirteenth Doctor, led by Chibnall, began later in 2017, after he completed work on the third series of the ITV series Broadchurch, for which he is also the head writer and executive producer. Chibnall had the final say on the actor, although the decision also involved Charlotte Moore and Piers Wenger, the director of content and head of drama for the BBC, respectively. Media reports and bookmakers speculated as to who would replace Capaldi as the Thirteenth Doctor, with Ben Whishaw and Kris Marshall among the most popular predictions. On 16 July 2017, it was announced after the 2017 Wimbledon Championships men's finals that Whittaker would portray the thirteenth incarnation of the Doctor.

The episode introduced a new set of companions, including Bradley Walsh, Tosin Cole, and Mandip Gill as Graham O'Brien, Ryan Sinclair and Yasmin Khan, respectively. Actress Sharon D. Clarke appeared as Ryan's grandmother and Graham's wife, Grace. The episode also guest-stars Johnny Dixon and Samuel Oatley.

=== Filming ===
Jamie Childs directed the first and ninth episode of the series in the opening production block, having directed Whittaker's introduction video as the Thirteenth Doctor.

Whittaker, in an interview, spoke highly of Jamie Childs direction:

"I met Jamie Childs who directed the first and last block of our season…He is an encyclopaedia on cinema in a way that we have very similar taste and all of our references were absolutely in the same place and I just felt so excited!”.

Pre-production for the eleventh series began in late October 2017. After filming for the series was expected to begin in late 2017, it officially began with the first episode on 30 October 2017. The eleventh series was shot using Cooke and Angénieux anamorphic lenses for the first time in the series' history, a creative decision made in order to make the show look more cinematic.

Filming of the train cab scenes was on one of the four Class 489 preserved (Unit 9110) at the Barry Tourist Railway in Barry.

=== Promotion ===
The first teaser for the series was released during the final of the 2018 FIFA World Cup on 15 July 2018, almost exactly a year after the announcement of Whittaker as the Thirteenth Doctor. Whittaker, Gill, Cole, Chibnall and Strevens promoted the show with a panel at San Diego Comic-Con on 19 July 2018, where the first trailer was released.

== Broadcast and reception ==
Professional ratings
Aggregate scores
Source	Rating
Rotten Tomatoes (Average Score)	8.13
Rotten Tomatoes (Tomatometer)	92%
Review scores
Source	Rating
Daily Mirror	4/5 stars
IGN	8.7
IndieWire	B−
New York Magazine	4/5 stars
New York Post	4/5 stars
Radio Times	3/5 stars
The A.V. Club	B
The Telegraph	4/5 stars
The Guardian	4/5 stars
The Independent	4/5 stars
TV Fanatic	5/5 stars

=== Television ===
As "The Woman Who Fell to Earth" was the premiere episode of the eleventh series, it was aired for an extended broadcast length, like previous series' premieres, for a total of 64 minutes, with a broadcast both in the United Kingdom on BBC One, and United States on BBC America. The episode length was described by the BBC as "feature-length". The premiere episode of the eleventh series featured neither opening titles nor credits, and was the only episode of the "revived" era to begin without either of these – while episodes such as "The Day of the Doctor" (2013) and "Sleep No More" (2015) were created with a similar lack of these, they featured either a modified title sequence or opening credit sequence.

=== Cinemas ===
The premiere of the new series was held at Light Cinema in Sheffield on 24 September 2018, as part of a red carpet event for the episode and eleventh series. "The Woman Who Fell to Earth" was released in Brazilian cinemas on 7 October 2018, in Russian, Ukrainian, Belarusian, Kazakhstani and Azerbaijani cinemas on 7–8 October, in select Australian cinemas on 8 October, and in the United States on 10–11 October.

=== Ratings ===
The episode was watched by 8.20 million viewers overnight, accounting for an audience share of 40.1% during its first broadcast, and making it the highest overnight viewership since "The Time of the Doctor" (2013), which received 8.30 million overnight viewers. Additionally, it marked the highest overnight figure for a series premiere since the opening episode of the fourth series "Partners in Crime" (2008), which achieved 8.40 million viewers. "The Woman Who Fell to Earth" received a total of 10.96 million viewers, making it the highest series premiere for a Doctor in the history of the programme, and the highest consolidated ratings since "The Time of the Doctor" (2013). The episode received an Audience Appreciation Index score of 83. In December 2018, the BBC released details for the top ten requested episodes on iPlayer for the month of October, with "The Woman Who Fell to Earth" ranking second with 2.96 million requests.

In the United States, the original broadcast on BBC America, part of a worldwide simulcast, was watched by 1.37 million viewers, combining for a total of 1.88 million viewers. The episode received 480,000 viewers upon its Australian premiere.

=== Critical response ===
The review aggregator website Rotten Tomatoes reported a 92% approval rating for the episode, based on 37 reviews, with an average score of 8.13/10. The site's consensus reads "Jodie Whittaker easily embodies the best of the titular time traveler in 'The Woman Who Fell to Earth' and proves that change can be a very, very good thing."

Conversely, James Delingpole for The Spectator responded negatively to the episode, praising Whittaker's performance and the characterisation of her Doctor, but questioned its political subtext and the characteristics of Graham, Ryan and Yaz. Merryana Salem of Junkie called Grace's death "fridged...Grace’s death existed purely to save the Doctor, and push Ryan and…Graham…into travelling with the Doctor to avoid their grief."
