= Thirteenth Doctor =

Fictional character from Doctor Who

The Doctor
The Thirteenth Doctor
- Doctor Who character
- Jodie Whittaker as the Thirteenth Doctor
- First regular appearance: "The Woman Who Fell to Earth" (2018)
- Last regular appearance: "The Power of the Doctor" (2022)
- Introduced by: Chris Chibnall
- Portrayed by: Jodie Whittaker
- Preceded by: Peter Capaldi (Twelfth Doctor)
- Succeeded by: David Tennant (Fourteenth Doctor)

Information
- Tenure: 7 October 2018 – 23 October 2022
- No of series: 3
- Appearances: 24 stories (31 episodes)
- Companions: Graham O'Brien; Ryan Sinclair; Yaz Khan; Jack Harkness; Dan Lewis; Tegan Jovanka; Ace
- Chronology: Series 11 (2018); Series 12 (2020); Series 13 (2021); Specials (2022); Series 15 (2025)

The Thirteenth Doctor is an incarnation of the Doctor, the protagonist of the BBC's science fiction television series Doctor Who. She is played by Jodie Whittaker, the first woman to portray the character, in three series, five specials and a cameo in the fifteenth series. As with previous incarnations of the Doctor, the character has also appeared in other Doctor Who spin-offs, both during and after the character's televised appearances.

Within the series's narrative, the Doctor is a millennia-old, alien Time Lord from the planet Gallifrey, with somewhat unknown origins, who travels in time and space in their TARDIS, frequently with companions. At the end of life, the Doctor regenerates; as a result, the physical appearance and personality of the Doctor change. Whittaker's incarnation is a light-hearted adventurer with a passion for building things, placing a high value on friendships and striving for non-violent solutions. Preceded in regeneration by the Twelfth Doctor (Peter Capaldi), she is followed by the Fourteenth Doctor (David Tennant).

This incarnation's first companions were a trio consisting of retired bus driver Graham O'Brien (Bradley Walsh), his dyspraxic step-grandson and part-time warehouse worker Ryan Sinclair (Tosin Cole), and probationary police officer Yasmin "Yaz" Khan (Mandip Gill), all of whom she met shortly after her regeneration. After Graham and Ryan leave, the Doctor and Yaz are joined by food bank volunteer Dan Lewis (John Bishop). She also had one-episode reunions with former companions Captain Jack Harkness (John Barrowman), Tegan Jovanka (Janet Fielding), and Ace (Sophie Aldred).

== Casting ==
In January 2016, Steven Moffat announced that he would leave the show after the tenth series; he was set to be replaced by new showrunner, Chris Chibnall. Peter Capaldi confirmed a year later that the tenth series would be his last as well. Following this news, several media reports and bookmakers had speculated as to who would replace Capaldi as the Thirteenth Doctor. Bookmakers' favourites included Ben Whishaw, Phoebe Waller-Bridge, Kris Marshall, and Tilda Swinton.

=== Casting a woman ===
The concept of a female Doctor was first mentioned in 1981, when Tom Baker suggested his successor might be female, after announcing the end of his tenure as the Fourth Doctor. Producer, John Nathan-Turner, later discussed the possibility of casting a woman as the Sixth Doctor to replace the departing Peter Davison's Fifth Doctor, claiming it was feasible, but not something he was considering at the moment. In October 1986, during the transmission of Colin Baker's final season as the Sixth Doctor, series creator, Sydney Newman, wrote to BBC Controller, Michael Grade, with a suggestion that "at a later stage, Doctor Who should be metamorphosed into a woman". Dawn French, Joanna Lumley, and Frances de la Tour, were suggested by Newman in 1986 for the role, but were dismissed by the BBC. Lumley later appeared as a satirical version of the Thirteenth Doctor in the 1999 Comic Relief special, The Curse of Fatal Death. Arabella Weir also played an alternative Third Doctor in the Doctor Who Unbound Big Finish episode, Exile. Neither portrayal is typically considered to be within the show's main continuity. Producer, Jane Tranter, also considered casting Judi Dench as the Ninth Doctor.

The concept of Time Lords changing sex upon regeneration was seeded throughout Moffat's tenure as showrunner. Just after regenerating, the Eleventh Doctor exclaims "I'm a girl?" In the 2011 episode, "The Doctor's Wife", the Doctor recalls a Time Lord acquaintance known as the Corsair, who had at least two female incarnations. In the 2013 short, "The Night of the Doctor", the Sisterhood of Karn offer a dying Eighth Doctor (Paul McGann) control over his inevitable regeneration, with "man or woman" being touted as possibilities. The first on-screen cross-gender regeneration was shown in the 2015 episode, "Hell Bent", in which a white male Gallifreyan general (Ken Bones) regenerates into a black woman (T'Nia Miller), who states that her previous incarnation was the only time she had been a man.

The most notable Time Lord to have appeared in both male and female forms prior to Whittaker's casting is the Doctor's nemesis, the Master, portrayed from 2014 to 2017 by Scottish actress, Michelle Gomez. This version of the character was known as Missy, short for "Mistress". The tenth series finale, "World Enough and Time" / "The Doctor Falls", addresses cross-gender regeneration several times; the Doctor tells his companion Bill Potts (Pearl Mackie) that Missy was "his first man-crush", and adds that he is only "fairly sure" he himself was male at the time, although the remark may have been flippant.

Two years prior to the announcement of Whittaker's casting, fans and scholars discussed the possibility of a female Doctor and analysed the benefits of such a regeneration.

=== Casting Whittaker ===
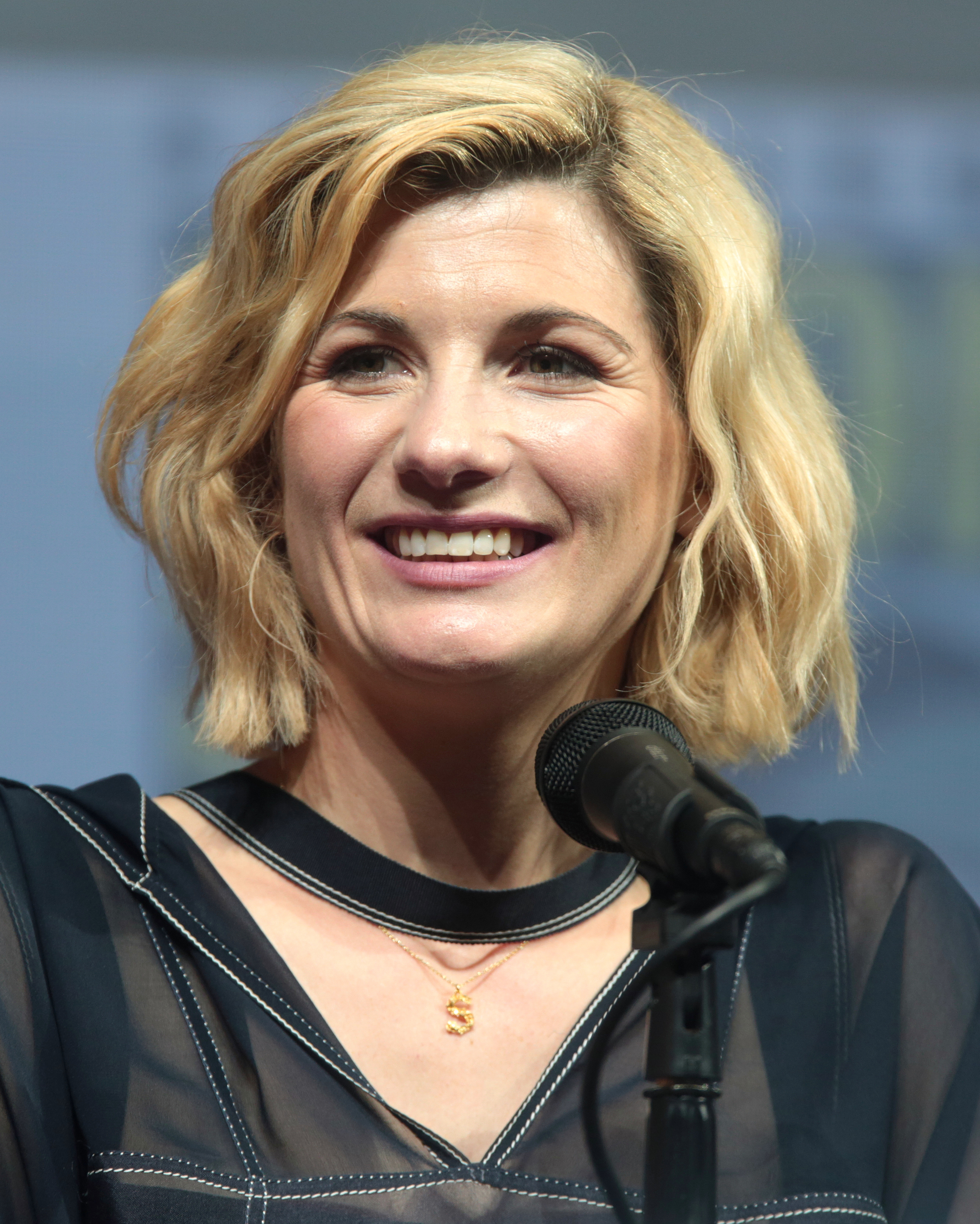
Jodie Whittaker (pictured in 2018) portrays the Thirteenth Doctor

When referring to whether the new Doctor would be a woman, incoming Doctor Who showrunner Chris Chibnall originally was quoted in February 2017, as saying, "Nothing is ruled out but I don't want the casting to be a gimmick and that's all I can say". On 14 July 2017, the BBC announced that the portrayer of the Thirteenth Doctor would be revealed after the 2017 Wimbledon Championships men's finals on 16 July 2017. Whittaker was introduced as the Thirteenth Doctor on 16 July and subsequently made her debut in the 2017 Christmas special "Twice Upon a Time" and starring in the eleventh series. On Whittaker's casting, Chibnall said, "I always knew I wanted the Thirteenth Doctor to be a woman and we're thrilled to have secured our number one choice. Her audition for The Doctor simply blew us all away." Later on in his statement, Chibnall called Whittaker "an in-demand, funny, inspiring, super-smart force of nature" and said that she "will bring loads of wit, strength and warmth to the role."

In an interview with Tenth Doctor actor and Broadchurch co-star David Tennant, Whittaker said she did not grow up watching Doctor Who and had decided against watching it to prepare for the role, saying: "I started to watch a bit during my audition process and I quickly decided that was not the way for me...It just made me panic...[Chibnall] said to me, 'you're not coming in and playing the Doctor, you're playing the truth of the scene and the Doctor will come out of that'... so, that's what I did."

In November 2018, BBC confirmed that the twelfth series, Whittaker's second series, began production in November 2018. The series premiere aired on 1 January 2020. Whittaker continued on in the role for the thirteenth series.

Whittaker and Chibnall stated they would exit the show following the thirteenth series and three specials, which aired through 2022. Chibnall said "Jodie and I made a 'three series and out' pact with each other at the start of this once-in-a-lifetime blast. So now our shift is done, and we're handing back the Tardis keys. Jodie's magnificent, iconic Doctor has exceeded all our high expectations." She was succeeded by Tennant as the Fourteenth Doctor.

== Characterisation ==
Interviewed by Radio Times, Chibnall described the Thirteenth Doctor as "absolutely the Doctor, but there's a new calibration, a new mixture of Doctorishness. The Thirteenth Doctor is incredibly lively, warm, funny, energetic, inclusive – she's the greatest friend you could wish to have as your guide around the universe." In the same article, Whittaker also added that her Doctor "speak[s] at a hundred miles an hour," while actress Mandip Gill who plays companion Yaz Khan, commented that Whittaker's Doctor "has a similar energy to Matt Smith's Doctor... Very high energy. Jodie has that about her Doctor."

== Costume ==
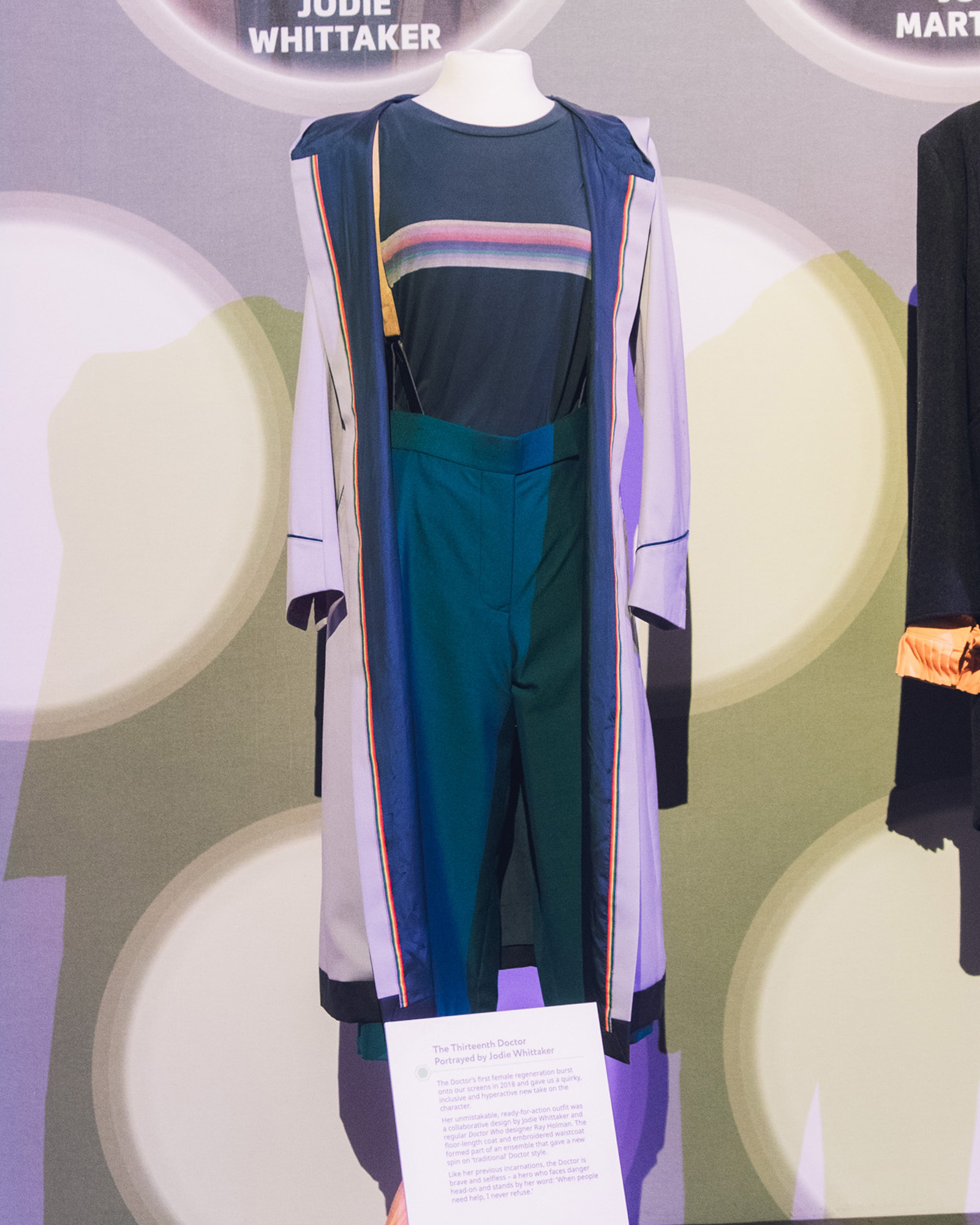
The Thirteenth Doctor's costume

In the clip in which the casting of Whittaker was announced, she wears a grey overcoat over a black hoodie. The first images of Whittaker's official costume as the Doctor were released to the media on 9 November 2017.

The Thirteenth Doctor's costume features blue high-waisted culottes with yellow braces, a navy blue t-shirt with a rainbow stripe across it, a lilac-blue trenchcoat with a hood, brown lace-up boots, blue socks and piercings on her left ear. Some fans noted that the outfit had similarities to earlier Doctors' costumes, with others comparing it to Robin Williams' costume in the American sitcom Mork & Mindy.

Whittaker stated that she worked with the show's costume designer Ray Holman (who had also worked before with Whittaker on Broadchurch) to come up with her outfit, inspired by a photograph that she had found online. The photograph had been published in a 1988 issue of Sassy showing a number of female models in men's clothing, with the specific photo of a woman in trousers, braces and a T-shirt, walking with a purpose. Whittaker said she "just love[d] the androgyny of it, without it being masculine", and that "felt intriguing and kind of open to interpretation and I really love that". Additional elements drew out from the photograph. Whittaker wanted a coat that flowed with her actions and gave her pockets but otherwise did not have any fasteners, and she wanted some colour within the outfit but without going too "cartoonish". Holman added violet to the inside of the coat's sleeves, a reference to the violet-and-green colours of the Suffragettes.

== Appearances ==
=== Television ===
The Thirteenth Doctor makes her debut in the final scene of 2017 Christmas special "Twice Upon a Time". After regenerating, The Doctor falls out of the TARDIS and, in series premiere "The Woman Who Fell to Earth" (2018), lands in modern-day Sheffield, where she befriends retired bus driver Graham O'Brien (Bradley Walsh), his wife's grandson Ryan Sinclair (Tosin Cole), and police officer Yasmin "Yaz" Khan (Mandip Gill), with whom she successfully repels an alien hunter from the warlike Stenza race. The Doctor builds a device to return her to the TARDIS, but accidentally teleports her new friends with her; the group help retrieve the TARDIS on an alien world in "The Ghost Monument". After a trip to segregation-era Alabama in "Rosa", Graham, Ryan, and Yaz agree to being full-time companions in "Arachnids in the UK". Subsequent trips include visiting Yaz's grandmother in 1947; witnessing the partition of India in "Demons of the Punjab"; preventing a plan to kill millions galaxy-wide as part of a labour protest, in "Kerblam!"; and repelling an alien invasion alongside James VI and I in Jacobean Lancashire, in "The Witchfinders". In series finale "The Battle of Ranskoor Av Kolos", the Doctor is drawn into a second confrontation with the Stenza she faced in Sheffield. In the New Year's Day special "Resolution" (2019), her friends encounter a Dalek for the first time when it is awakened by archaeologists in Sheffield. The Dalek is defeated before it can signal a broader Dalek invasion of Earth.

In "Spyfall" (2020), the Doctor faces off against the regenerated Master (Sacha Dhawan), who reveals that he has destroyed their home planet of Gallifrey in revenge for the Time Lords having lied to them about their species' origins, concerning a story of the "Timeless Child". In "Fugitive of the Judoon", the Doctor learns her former companion Jack Harkness (John Barrowman) has sent her a warning – "Do not give the Lone Cyberman what it wants" – just as she was encountering a past incarnation of herself (played by Jo Martin), that she has no recollection of being. The Doctor ignores Jack's warning in "The Haunting of Villa Diodati", when the Doctor gives a partially-converted Cyberman (Patrick O'Kane) from the future a compendium containing all knowledge of the fallen Cyber-Empire, in order to save the life of Percy Shelley (Lewis Rainer) and protect human history. The Doctor and her friends pursue the Lone Cyberman to the future and the aftermath of the Cyber-Wars in "Ascension of the Cybermen", where he has set in motion a plan to rebuild the Cyber-Empire and wipe out all life in the universe. As the last fragments of humanity face destruction at the hands of the Cybermen, the Doctor is pulled through a portal to Gallifrey by the Master in "The Timeless Children", where she learns of a radical cover-up of her origins: she is in fact the Timeless Child, an orphan from an unknown world whose unique power to regenerate was studied and replicated by her adopted mother, whose people used it to build the Time Lord empire. The Time Lords then forced her to work for them as an agent of the secretive "Division" for many years before erasing her memories. The Doctor defeats the Master's plan to conquer the universe with a new race of "CyberMaster" Cybermen-Time Lord hybrids, but is then arrested by the Judoon. She is broken out of prison by Jack Harkness in the New Year's Day special "Revolution of the Daleks" (2021), and with his help the TARDIS crew prevent an attempted takeover of Earth by clones of the Dalek discovered in Sheffield. Following this adventure, Jack, Ryan, and Graham choose to stay behind on Earth, leaving Yaz as the Doctor's sole travelling companion.

In Series 13 (2021), titled "Flux", the Doctor and Yaz are joined by new companion Dan Lewis (John Bishop) as Swarm (Sam Spruell), an enemy from the Doctor's forgotten past as a Division agent, returns to take revenge upon her. At the same time, the Flux, a cosmic event that has the power to destroy entire galaxies, rips through the universe, and Sontarans, Daleks, Cybermen, and Weeping Angels begin amassing. Swarm and his sister Azure attempt to trap the universe in a loop where it will be continually destroyed by the Flux, while the Sontarans attempt to survive it by having the combined matter of the Daleks' and Cybermen's fleets absorb and stop the Flux. An alien race called the Lupari, meanwhile, defend the Earth from the Flux. The Doctor manages to split herself into three temporal entities, one letting herself be tortured by Swarm at Division, while the other two sabotage the Sontarans' plan so that they are destroyed with the Daleks and the Cybermen, before the Doctor safely redirects the Flux. The crisis concludes with Dan joining the Doctor and Yaz as a full-time companion, but the Doctor is troubled by a warning that her end is nearing. In "Legend of the Sea Devils" (2022), Yaz confesses to the Doctor that she holds romantic feelings for her, which the Doctor acknowledges but discourages Yaz from acting on, as it will only lead to heartbreak. In "The Power of the Doctor", the Master returns alongside his CyberMasters in an alliance with the Daleks to eliminate the Doctor once and for all by stealing her body through a forced regeneration. Although defeated narrowly by Yaz and some of the Doctor's friends and past companions, the Master is able to land a fatal laser attack on the Doctor. When her regeneration process starts, she chooses to spend some quality time with Yaz before parting ways with her one last time. Alone, the Doctor regenerates overlooking the view from Durdle Door, and finds their new body is similar to an old one (played by David Tennant).

In the Series 15 finale "The Reality War" (2025), she makes an appearance just before the Fifteenth Doctor (Ncuti Gatwa) uses his regeneration energy to shift the timeline back to normality and offers him a hand in doing so.

=== Literature ===
The first book to feature the Thirteenth Doctor was the short story collection Doctor Who: Twelve Angels Weeping by Dave Rudden, released in October 2018. New Series Adventures released three novels starring the Thirteenth Doctor, Graham O'Brien, Ryan Sinclair and Yaz Khan in October/November 2018: The Good Doctor, Molten Heart, and Combat Magicks. A novel targeted at younger readers, The Secret in Vault 13, was published that November by BBC Children's Books. The Thirteenth Doctor cameos in Tom Baker's and James Goss' 2019 Doctor Who novel Scratchman. At Childhood's End, published in February 2020 is written by Sophie Aldred, who previously played the Seventh Doctor's companion Ace, and features an adult Ace reuniting with the Thirteenth Doctor to investigate a threat that links to the circumstances that prompted Ace to leave the Seventh Doctor, the reunion with the Thirteenth Doctor encouraging Ace to reconsider her relationship with the Doctor.

=== Video games ===
Doctor Who: The Runaway is a VR game released for Oculus Rift and HTC Vive in 2019, and via Steam in 2020.

=== Audio drama ===
In July 2024, Big Finish Productions announced that Whittaker would reprise her role as the Doctor for a series of audio dramas, alongside Gill returning as Yaz. The Thirteenth Doctor Adventures started in July 2025 and will run for twelve episodes.

== Reception ==
=== Announcement ===
Fan reaction to Whittaker's casting was largely positive, although "a sizeable minority protested that the Doctor shouldn't be played by a woman." Some said that a female Doctor would be a good role model for young girls, while others felt the Doctor was only ever meant to be male, or criticised the casting as an exercise in political correctness. During the Doctor Who panel at the 2017 San Diego Comic-Con, outgoing showrunner Steven Moffat denied there had been a "backlash" over Whittaker's casting, and said there was "80% approval on social media". Moffat commented, "It strikes me that Doctor Who fans are more excited about the idea of a brilliant actress playing the part than the fact she's a woman. It's been incredibly progressive and enlightened."

Guardian journalist Zoe Williams described Whittaker's casting as "the revolutionary feminist we need right now", lauding the decision as "the difference between tolerating modernity and embodying it". Williams compared the casting of a female Doctor to other examples of the show breaking "cultural taboo[s]", mentioning companions Captain Jack Harkness (John Barrowman) and Bill Potts (Pearl Mackie) as examples of the show's diversity.

=== Response from Doctor Who actors ===
The world we live in has a history of male domination, of stereotyping, of resistance to change, of playing it safe. Doctor Who has never been about that. The Doctor in all his incarnations has always been a passionate defender of justice, equality, fairness and resisted those who seek to dominate or destroy.

— Colin Baker, 17 July 2017

Reaction among former Doctor Who actors was largely positive. Colin Baker, who portrayed the Sixth Doctor, quoting his own character in his introductory stories The Caves of Androzani and The Twin Dilemma, tweeted: "Change my dears and not a moment too soon — she IS the Doctor whether you like it or not!" In an opinion piece for The Guardian, Baker wrote that he had "never been able to think of any logical reason" why the Doctor could not be a woman, and described himself as "shocked" that some fans of the show were vowing not to watch again due to Whittaker's casting.

Conversely, Peter Davison, who portrayed the Fifth Doctor, stated that the casting would mean the "loss of a role model for boys". Nevertheless, he noted that Whittaker is a "terrific actress" and would do "a wonderful job" in the role. Baker and Davison argued over the casting at the 2017 San Diego Comic-Con. Tom Baker, who portrayed the Fourth Doctor, reacted positively to the news. However, he warned that if the audience were to lose interest, Whittaker should be replaced: "I think it might be quite nice to have a woman. But you [BBC] just test it. If the audience don't like it then just kill her off. ... Nobody has ever failed by the way, nobody has, it's just how it is." Freema Agyeman, who played Martha Jones between 2007 and 2010, said she was "astounded" by the negative reception from some fans, noting that the show's history of change was key to its strength and longevity. Other former cast members Christopher Eccleston, Sylvester McCoy, Katy Manning, David Tennant, Billie Piper, Karen Gillan and John Barrowman reacted positively to the news.

=== Critical reception ===
Whittaker received positive reviews for her portrayal in the eleventh series. Ed Power of The Independent applauded her introduction in "The Woman Who Fell to Earth", commenting "Whittaker is a force of breezy nature – rambunctious, quirky but with a reassuring familiar aura of Gallifreyan uncanniness." Adding upon this he stated "still, she's soon in her stride with a turn that swerves satisfyingly between whimsical and tom-boyish." Morgan Jeffery of Digital Spy called her debut performance "terrific" and "fizzling with energy". Ben Lawrence of The Telegraph commented "Whittaker is a breath of fresh air: a talented, emotionally engaged actress who brings warmth and humanity to a show that was largely in danger of disappearing up its own black hole. From the outset, she proves to be a charismatic presence, righting alien wrongs in the gleaming metropolis of Sheffield (of all places.) Likeable, funny, as brave as a lion, Whittaker's Doctor has ushered in a new era for this 55-year-old show, with a remarkable level of assurance." After watching the first five episodes of the eleventh series, Radio Times Flora Carr commented: "She's channelled the best elements of recent Doctors (Matt Smith's whimsy, David Tennant's frenetic energy, Peter Capaldi's wry humour...), but above all, she's made the role her own." Mark Braxton also said, "Jodie's Doctor is a whirlwind of likeability and energy, a tour de force that has relaunched the show with panache." BBC Drama controller Piers Wenger told Radio Times his opinion of Whittaker's performance, stating it was "intensely moral, a little distracted and bursting with energy, she's both the Doctor we know and a new version of the Time Lord. Gone is the daffiness and idiosyncrasy of her predecessors in favour of a Doctor with energy, spark and relatability."

Later reception of Whittaker's portrayal saw some criticism. Merryana Salem of Junkee panned her performance as "constantly fidgety, rambling and flitting about like a primary school teacher with too much caffeine on board in what constantly felt like a weak impersonation of the character". Both Bleeding Cool's Adi Tantimedh and The Escapist's Darren Mooney criticised the Thirteen Doctor for doing little to combat social and political injustices "as if afraid of challenging the status quo". Other aspects of Whittaker's tenure have been considered divisive, with praise for the series' improved production values, but criticism for the scripts, characterisation, and the additions to previously established lore concerning the Doctor's origins in the episode "The Timeless Children".

For the 23rd Satellite Awards, Whittaker received a nomination for Best Actress in a Series, Drama/Genre. Whittaker was also nominated at the National Television Awards in the Best Dramatic Performance category, in the TV Choice Awards in the Best Actress Category, at the ITalkTelly Awards in the Best Dramatic Performance category, and she won the Heat Magazine Unmissable Award for actress of the year. In 2019, Whittaker received a Saturn Award nomination for Best Actress on Television for her performance in the eleventh series, making her the third person to receive a Saturn Award nomination for playing the Doctor after Paul McGann and David Tennant.
