= Brexit: The Uncivil War =

2019 British television political drama film

- Promotional poster
- Based on: All Out War: The Full Story of How Brexit Sank Britain's Political Class by Tim Shipman Unleashing Demons: The Inside Story of Brexit by Craig Oliver
- Directed by: Toby Haynes
- Starring: Benedict Cumberbatch; Lee Boardman; Richard Goulding; John Heffernan; Oliver Maltman; Simon Paisley Day; Lucy Russell; Paul Ryan; Kyle Soller; Liz White; Rory Kinnear
- Music by: Daniel Pemberton
- Country of origin: United Kingdom
- Original language: English

Production
- Producer: Lynn Horsford
- Cinematography: Danny Cohen
- Editor: Matthew Cannings
- Running time: 92 minutes
- Production company: House Productions

Original release
- Network: Channel 4
- Release: 7 January 2019

Brexit: The Uncivil War (simply Brexit in the US) is a 2019 British drama television film written by James Graham and directed by Toby Haynes. It depicts the lead-up to the 2016 referendum through the activities of the strategists behind the Vote Leave campaign, that prompted the United Kingdom to exit the European Union, known as Brexit. Benedict Cumberbatch stars as Dominic Cummings, the Campaign Director of the officially designated Brexit-supporting group, Vote Leave. Rory Kinnear stars as Craig Oliver, one of the leaders of the officially designated Remain-supporting group, Britain Stronger in Europe.

It aired on Channel 4 in the United Kingdom on 7 January, and aired on HBO in the United States on 19 January. The film received generally positive reviews from critics, with praise for its pacing, black comedy, and the depiction of the campaign as a thriller, and with particular praise for Cumberbatch's performance which was likened to his role in the TV series Sherlock. The film received a nomination at the 2020 British Academy Television Awards for Best Single Drama, and at the 71st Primetime Emmy Awards for Outstanding Television Movie.

== Plot ==
The film opens in 2020, at a future (fictional) public inquiry, where a frustrated Dominic Cummings attempts to explain to the panel that they have no understanding of the way in which technology is reshaping politics and therefore society in the United Kingdom.

In 2015, Cummings rejects an offer by UKIP MP Douglas Carswell and political strategist Matthew Elliott to lead the Vote Leave campaign due to his contempt for "Westminster politics", but accepts when Carswell promises him full control. Cummings uses "algorithmic database-driven micro-targeting tools" delivered via social media/internet, instead of a traditional campaign of posters/phone calls/leaflets delivered by local MPs. Cummings rejects an approach by Nigel Farage and Arron Banks of Leave.EU to merge campaigns, as his data shows Farage is an obstacle to winning a majority. Cummings' technology-driven approach causes friction with Vote Leave MPs and donors. John Mills, chair of Vote Leave, tries to fire Cummings to merge with Leave.EU, but instead finds himself fired.

Cummings and his Remain counterpart, Craig Oliver, lay out their strategies and opinion of each other to their respective teams. Both identify the one-third of undecided UK voters as the key. Oliver targets "Jobs and the Economy", while Cummings feels the "Loss of Control" and the possible accession of Turkey to the EU is a greater concern. Cummings invokes a strategy from Sun Tzu's The Art of War and avoids refuting "Jobs and the Economy" to instead focus on their own message – "Take Back Control" – that positions Remain as the "historical status quo" and Vote Leave as the "change" option. Cummings meets and hires Canadian Zack Massingham, co-founder of AggregateIQ, who offers to build a database using social media tools of voters who are not on the UK electoral register but are inclined to vote to leave. Arron Banks meets Robert Mercer, who discusses the potential of social media database tools.

Cummings, using the AggregateIQ database, brings MP Douglas Carswell to Jaywick, a part of his constituency he did not know existed, where a couple articulates the destitution of their position. Oliver, using the traditional focus-groups, realises that his campaign has failed to understand the concerns of many UK voters as one focus-group descends into a mass quarrel with one member breaking down crying: "I'm sick of feeling like nothing like I have nothing! Like I know nothing. Like I am nothing. I'm sick of it". Oliver's own staff becomes demoralised and angry.

In the final stages of the campaign, high-profile Conservative MPs Michael Gove and Boris Johnson join the Vote Leave campaign emphasising the need to "Take Back Control", while Penny Mordaunt raises concerns on BBC over the accession of Turkey. Gove and Johnson have some reticence over specific Vote Leave claims (e.g. £350 million for NHS, and 70 million potential Turkish emigrants) but overcome them. Oliver conducts an emergency Tory-Labour Remain conference call with the prime minister David Cameron and Peter Mandelson, but each side blames the other for the Remain campaign's decline. Following the murder of MP Jo Cox, Cummings and Oliver share a drink and discuss events, with Cummings comparing his campaign as having started a train that cannot be stopped, and Oliver replying: "Be careful what you wish for. You won't be able to control it either".

On 23 June 2016, Britain narrowly votes to leave the EU. After a victory speech, Cummings quietly leaves the Vote Leave campaign office. Back in the present at the 2020 (fictional) public inquiry, Cummings outlines his disappointment at how the political system reacted post the Vote Leave victory, and walks out in disgust.

== Cast ==
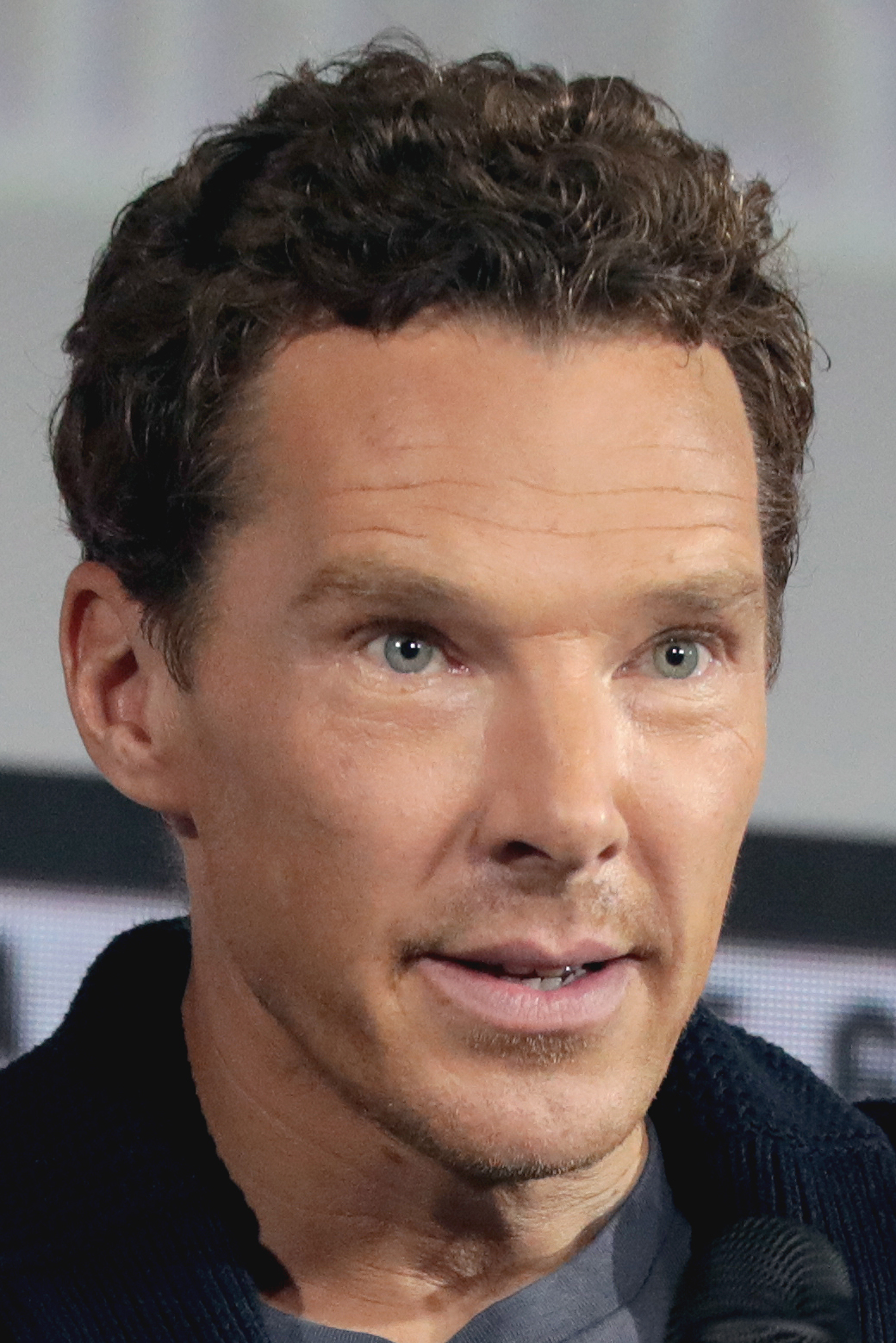
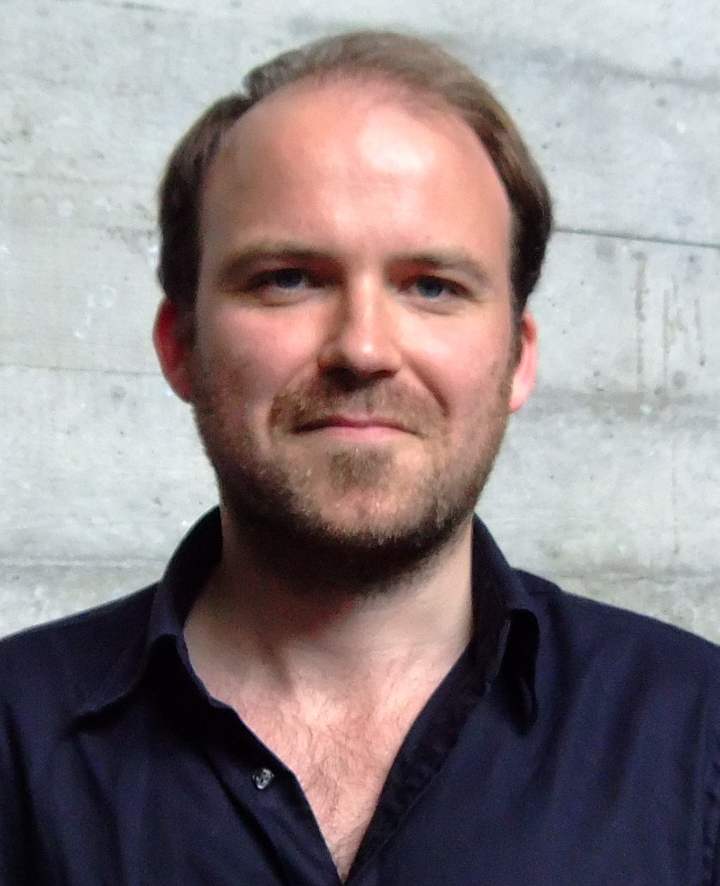
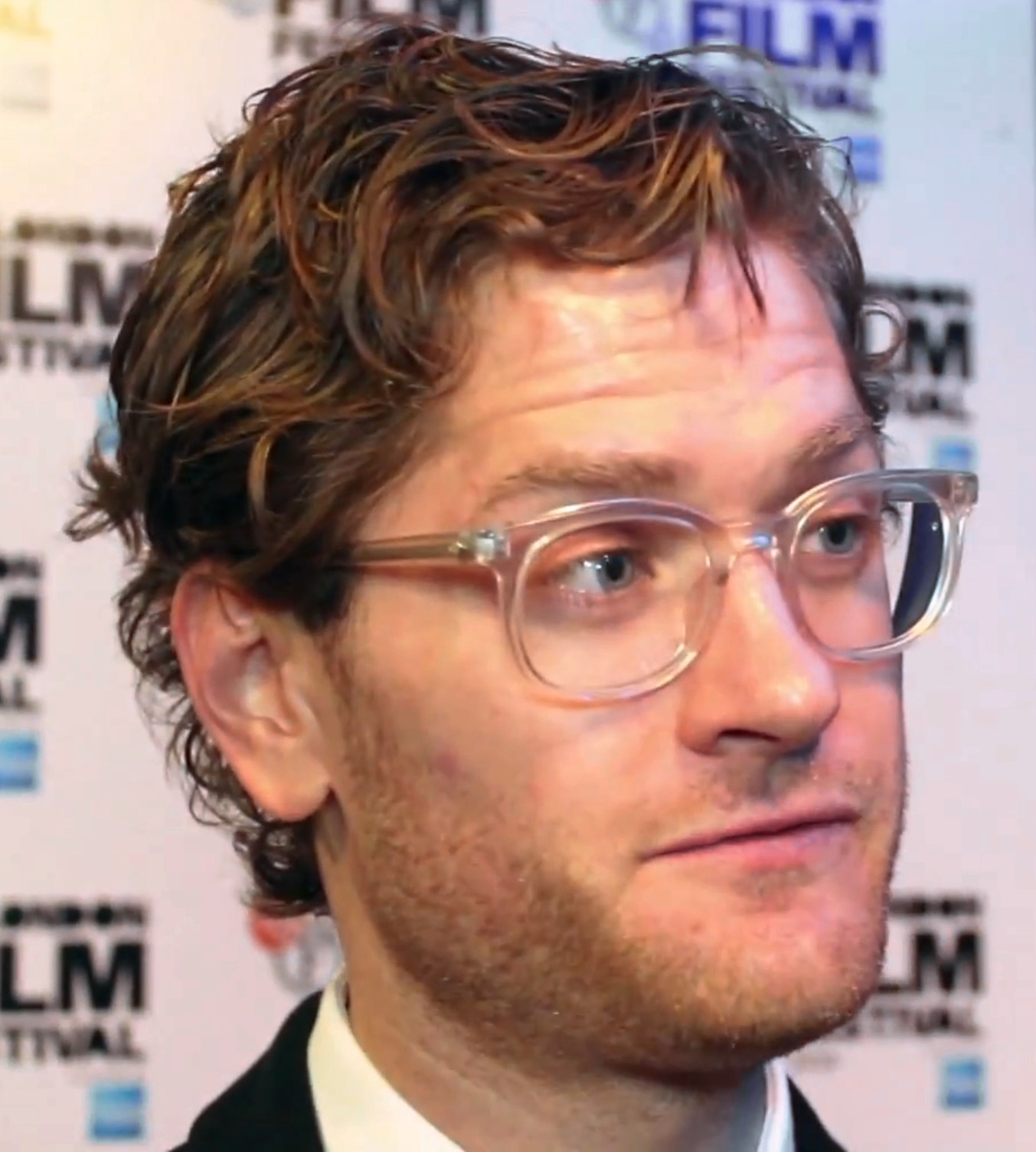
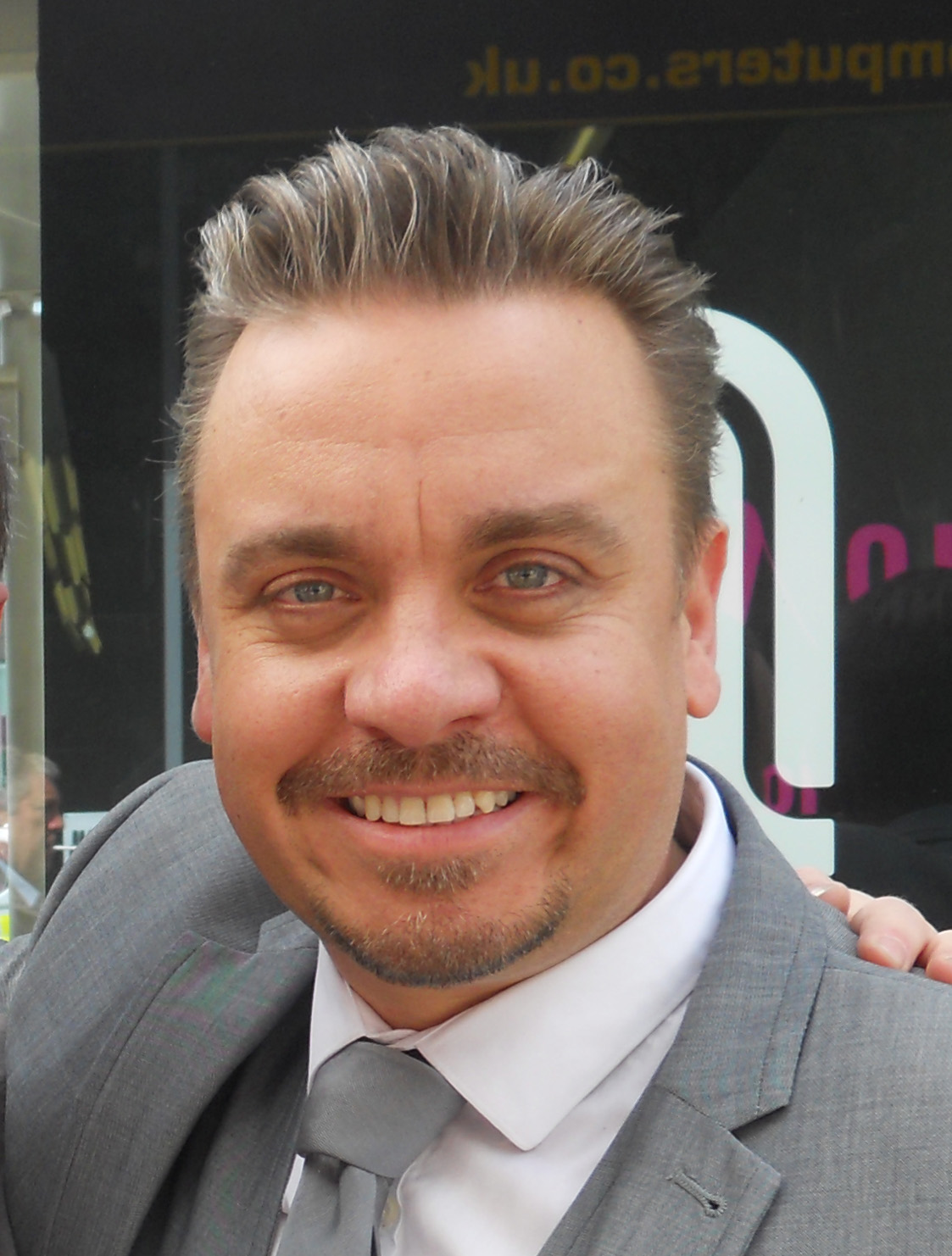
The film's cast included (clockwise): Benedict Cumberbatch, Rory Kinnear, Lee Boardman, and Kyle Soller
- Benedict Cumberbatch as Dominic Cummings, main political strategist for Vote Leave
- Rory Kinnear as Craig Oliver, main political strategist for Britain Stronger in Europe
- Lee Boardman as Arron Banks, businessman and co-founder of Leave.EU
- Richard Goulding as Boris Johnson, Conservative MP and Mayor of London (later prime minister) who campaigned for Vote Leave
- John Heffernan as Matthew Elliott, political strategist for Vote Leave
- Oliver Maltman as Michael Gove, Conservative MP who campaigned for Vote Leave
- Simon Paisley Day as Douglas Carswell, UKIP MP who campaigned for Vote Leave
- Lucy Russell as Elizabeth Denham, the Information Commissioner
- Paul Ryan as Nigel Farage, UKIP MEP and prominent Leave campaigner
- Kyle Soller as Zack Massingham, co-founder of AggregateIQ, hired by Cummings
- Liz White as Mary Wakefield, commissioning editor for The Spectator and wife of Cummings
- Kate O'Flynn as Victoria Woodcock, operations director for Vote Leave
- Nicholas Day as John Mills, businessman and chairman of Vote Leave, who is fired by Cummings
- Tim McMullan as Sir Bernard Jenkin, Conservative MP and board member of Vote Leave

The film also includes: Richard Durden as Sir Bill Cash, Conservative MP and board member of Vote Leave; Gavin Spokes as Andrew Cooper, political strategist and polling expert for Britain Stronger in Europe; Aden Gillett as Robert Mercer, US businessman and donor to Leave.EU; Mark Dexter as the voice of David Cameron, the prime minister; Mark Gatiss as the voice of Peter Mandelson, Labour peer and board member of Britain Stronger in Europe.

In addition, the focus-group casting includes: Annabelle Dowler as the focus group facilitator; Gabriel Akuwudike as Robin, the "ardent internationalist" focus group participant; John Arthur as Roger, the "EU hostile" focus group participant; Rakie Ayola as Camilla, the "comfortable Europhile" focus group participant; Jay Simpson as Steve, the "strong skeptic" focus group participant; Heather Coombs as Sandra, the "hearts vs heads" focus group participant; and Kiran Sonia Sawar as Shamara the "disengaged middle" focus group participant

== Production ==
=== Screenplay ===
James Graham, the film's screenwriter, originally wrote a first draft focusing on David Cameron, the UK's prime minister during the vote. However, he then changed it to Dominic Cummings, the campaign director of the official designated Brexit-supporting group, Vote Leave. In a Channel 4 News interview, Graham revealed that the film was based on the books All Out War: The Full Story of How Brexit Sank Britain's Political Class by Sunday Times political editor Tim Shipman, and Unleashing Demons: The Inside Story of Brexit by David Cameron's Downing Street communications director Craig Oliver, and on interviews with the campaign strategists involved, Cummings in particular. Oliver acted as a consultant on the film. In order to better play lead character Dominic Cummings, Benedict Cumberbatch visited him at his family home.

=== Filming ===
The film was commissioned in May 2018 by Channel 4 with Benedict Cumberbatch cast to play Dominic Cummings. Filming commenced in June with the supporting cast set, including Rory Kinnear and John Heffernan.

== Reception ==
=== Critical response ===
Critic reviews were generally positive after the 7 January 2019 broadcast of the film in the UK by Channel 4. On review aggregation website Rotten Tomatoes, the film holds an approval rating of 80% based on 55 reviews, with an average rating of 7.3/10. The website's critical consensus reads, "With acerbic wit and a mesmerizingly eccentric performance from Benedict Cumberbatch, Brexit energetically renders recent history with unflinching poise." Metacritic reports a weighted average score of 73 out of 100 based on 12 critics, indicating "generally favorable reviews".

Asa Bennet of The Daily Telegraph gave the film five out of five stars, calling it a "thrilling romp through the referendum" and praised Cumberbatch's performance as Cummings, comparing it to his role as Sherlock Holmes in the TV series Sherlock. Will Gompertz of the BBC gave the film four out of five stars and called the film "a very watchable TV movie that has a clear structure and a well-defined plot" and called Cumberbatch's performance "compelling". Carol Midgley of The Times gave the film four out of five stars stating, "Brexit without the boring bits is a blast". The Independent's Hugh Montgomery gave the film four out of five stars and praised Cumberbatch's acting, comparing it to both Sherlock and The Social Network. Peter Crawley in the Irish Times gave the film five out of five stars and called it a "political tragicomedy with the verve of a tech thriller", and that "it drips with great British humour". Suzi Feay in the Financial Times gave the film five out of five stars calling it: "An exhilarating, almost farcical dramatisation of 2016's successful Vote Leave campaign and its Machiavellian director", and "The only hindrance to enjoyment is the fact that we are all now living in the chaotic reality dreamt up by the diamond-eyed ideologue".

Lucy Mangan of The Guardian was very critical of the film, only awarding it two out of five stars, and calling it "superficial, irresponsible TV" and criticised the depiction of Nigel Farage and Arron Banks as "cartoonish buffoons instead of dangerous shit-stirrers".

=== Other commentators ===
British playwright and non-fiction author Sarah Helm, praised the film in The Guardian saying: "Nor has any piece of journalism bettered Graham's focus-group scene in portraying how the poison of Brexit has set ordinary people against each other, or exposed how easily our feeble leaders were led by opportunistic apparatchiks". Alice Jones in The New York Times said that "Brexit Is Dividing Britain. So Is a Brexit Movie". Charles Moore wrote in The Daily Telegraph that the film "told a story of forgotten people finding their voice".

=== People portrayed ===
On 4 January 2019, Matthew Elliott, played in the film by John Heffernan, wrote an article about the film in the Financial Times summarising that "Whatever happens, the 2016 campaign marked an important moment, and the film captures it well". Dominic Cummings's wife, Mary Wakefield wrote in The Spectator that Cumberbatch's portrayal of her husband even fooled their own son. The Guardian quoted Peter Mandelson (briefly portrayed on a conference call), as saying "The film is extraordinary", and "It presses every button and captures Britain at the time".

== Awards ==
- 2020 British Academy Television Awards for Best Single Drama
- In 2019, 71st Primetime Emmy Awards for Outstanding Television Movie (nominated).

== See also ==
- 2016 United Kingdom European Union membership referendum
- This England (2022), a six-part mini-series featuring Dominic Cummings
