= Kate O'Flynn =

British actress (born 1986)

- Born: Kate Ellen O'Flynn; 1985 (age 40–41); Bury, England
- Education: RADA (BA)
- Occupation: Actress
- Years active: 2006–present

Kate Ellen O'Flynn (born 1985) is a British actress. She is the recipient of a number of accolades, including a Primetime Emmy Award as well as nominations for a Laurence Olivier Award and British Academy Television Award.

On stage, O'Flynn is known her roles in the National Theatre productions of Port (2013), for which she won a Critics' Circle Theatre Award, and A Taste of Honey (2014), and The Glass Menagerie (2016–2017) at the Duke of York's Theatre, for which she was nominated for a Laurence Olivier Award for Best Actress in a Supporting Role in 2017.

On television, O'Flynn had roles in the ITV series Doctor Thorne (2018), the Sky Atlantic series Landscapers (2021), the Channel 4 series Everyone Else Burns (2023–2024), and the Amazon Prime series My Lady Jane (2024). She currently stars in the Apple TV comedy horror series Widow's Bay (2026–present), for which she won a Primetime Emmy Award. Her films include Happy-Go-Lucky (2008), Bridget Jones's Baby (2016), and Tender Loving Care (2026).

== Early life and education ==
Born in Bury, O'Flynn grew up on Hunters Green in Holcombe Brook. She is of Irish descent. Her father was a dentist, while her mother Clodagh was a French-language teacher at Tottington High School who was active in amateur dramatics as a longterm member of the Summerseat Players.

O'Flynn attended Bury Grammar School, completing her A Levels in 2003. As a teenager, she took part in school productions and followed her mother in joining the Summerseat Players as well as Manchester's Royal Exchange youth theatre. O'Flynn went on to train at the Royal Academy of Dramatic Art (RADA), graduating with a Bachelor of Arts (BA) in Acting in 2006.

== Career ==
O'Flynn's first professional role was in Mike Leigh's 2008 film Happy-Go-Lucky. Later that year, her performance in The Children's Hour with the Royal Exchange Theatre Company won her the 2008 TMA Theatre Award for Best Supporting Performance in a Play, with The Guardian writing "the one to watch is the outstanding newcomer Kate O'Flynn."

In 2009, Kate O'Flynn starred in the comedy-drama TV series Kingdom, with Stephen Fry, as Emily Cartright, council solicitor and girlfriend of trainee solicitor Lyle Anderson, played by Karl Davies. In the same year, O'Flynn appeared with Russell Tovey at London's Royal Court Theatre in Molly Davies' A Miracle. Michael Billington gave the play 3 stars out of five in his review for British newspaper The Guardian, finding that "Kate O'Flynn's Amy is a model of gawky despair" but concluding that the cast "fill out a play that provides plenty of evidence of youthful talent but that also leaves you wanting more". In the Evening Standard, Nicholas de Jongh praised O'Flynn's "beautiful rendering of passivity, selfishness and vulnerability", while The Daily Telegraph's Charles Spencer wrote, "Kate O'Flynn brings an astonishingly raw vulnerability to the stage as Amy, the tears streaming down her face as she describes how impossible she finds it to love and nurture her child".

O'Flynn appeared as Elizabeth Gough in the 2011 television film The Suspicions of Mr Whicher and as Liz in the British feature film comedy Up There, which was the winner of the Best Feature Film award at the 2012 British Academy Scotland Awards and was broadcast on BBC Two in August 2015. In 2012, O'Flynn played the role of Beryl in BBC Four's BAFTA Award-winning television adaptation Room at the Top, based on John Braine's novel of the same name.

In 2013, she performed at the National Theatre in its production of Port. Writing in The Guardian, Maddy Costa noted: "As Rachael [sic] in Simon Stephens's Port, she grew from a mouthy 11-year-old to a downtrodden but resilient 24-year-old – and in the process transformed from a relative unknown to a star in the making". Her performance won her the Critics' Circle's Jack Tinker Award for Most Promising Newcomer (other than a playwright). She returned to the National Theatre, playing Jo in its 2014 production of Shelagh Delaney's A Taste of Honey.

In 2014, O'Flynn appeared in her second Mike Leigh film Mr. Turner. She would then go on to appear in another of Leigh's films, Peterloo, in 2018.

In 2015, O'Flynn played the part of Dr Peep in police comedy drama No Offence, reprising her role in all three series. The following year, O'Flynn played Myrtle in the BBC Radio 4 sitcom Dot set in the Cabinet War Rooms. In the same year, she also played Lady Alexandrina De Courcy in the ITV costume drama Doctor Thorne, based on Anthony Trollope's novel of the same name. O'Flynn also played Alice Peabody, the new boss at Hard News in Bridget Jones's Baby.

Also in 2016, O'Flynn appeared in episode 6 of the second series of BBC's Father Brown "The Eagle and the Daw" as Katherine Corven. She reprised the character in the 2017 episode 6.2 "The Jackdaw's Revenge".

In 2019, O'Flynn played Victoria Woodcock in the television drama Brexit: The Uncivil War, written by James Graham. In 2021, she appeared in the miniseries Landscapers as DC Emma Lancing. In 2022, O'Flynn appeared in Death in Paradise as DI Neville Parker's sister Izzy.

In 2023, she was cast in Everyone Else Burns for Channel 4, playing Fiona, the wife of Simon Bird's character David. For this, she won a Royal Television Society North West Award for Best Performance in a Comedy. O'Flynn also appeared as Jen in Henpocalypse! on BBC Two; in the same year she played the lead character, Cassie, in the BBC Radio Four psychological drama Spores. In 2024, O'Flynn played Princess Mary Tudor in My Lady Jane, with The i Paper writing she "almost steals the show".

In 2026, O'Flynn began starring in the Apple TV series Widow's Bay, for which she won the Primetime Emmy Award for Outstanding Supporting Actress in a Comedy Series. The same year she reunited with Mike Leigh to star in his film Tender Loving Care. From October 16-23 2026, O'Flynn performed at the Almeida Theatre in London in Caryl Churchill's play Triumph.

== Personal life ==
Jonathan Bailey, who starred alongside O'Flynn in the play The House of Special Purpose (2009), calls her his "all-time bezzie". The pair also hiked to the Everest base camp in Nepal together in 2018.

== Acting credits ==
=== Film ===
| Year | Title | Role | Notes |
|---|---|---|---|
| 2008 | Happy-Go-Lucky | Suzy | |
| 2011 | Up There | Liz | |
| 2014 | Mr. Turner | Prostitute | |
| 2015 | Eliana | Eliana | Short film |
| 2016 | Bridget Jones's Baby | Alice | |
| 2018 | Peterloo | Chadderton Woman | |
| 2019 | The Octopus Nest | Becky | Short film |
| 2026 | Tender Loving Care | Amy | |
| 2027 | Naughty † | | Filming |
| TBA | Sweetsick † | | Post-production |

=== Television ===
| Year | Title | Role | Notes |
|---|---|---|---|
| 2006 | Heartbeat | Laura Hill | Episode: "Pretty Woman" |
| 2007 | Trial & Retribution | Jane Donnelly | Episode: "Paradise Lost: Part 1" |
| 2008 | The Palace | Ruby Riley | Regular character |
| 2009 | Kingdom | Emily Cartwright | Series 3 regular |
| 2011 | The Suspicions of Mr Whicher | Elizabeth Gough | Television film: "The Murder at Road Hill House" |
| 2012 | Above Suspicion | Jeannie Bale | 3 episodes |
| 2012 | Playhouse Presents | Woman | Episode: "The Snipist" |
| 2012 | The Syndicate | Tanya | 2 episodes |
| 2012 | Room at the Top | Beryl | 2 episodes |
| 2013 | New Tricks | Grace Kennedy | Episode: "Wild Justice" |
| 2015 | Ordinary Lies | Saskia | Episode: "Rick's Story" |
| 2015–2018 | No Offence | Dr Peep | 9 episodes |
| 2016 | Doctor Thorne | Lady Alexandrina de Courcy | Mini series, regular |
| 2017; 2017 | Father Brown | Katherine Corven | 2 episodes |
| 2018 | Wanderlust | Emily Riley | 5 episodes |
| 2019 | Brexit: The Uncivil War | Victoria Woodcock | Television film |
| 2019 | Shakespeare & Hathaway: Private Investigators | Ava Foyle | Episode: "Nothing Will Come of Nothing" |
| 2019 | Casualty | Lou Briggs | Series 33, episode 33 |
| 2021 | Close to Me | Rose | 3 episodes |
| 2021 | Landscapers | DC Emma Lancing | Main role |
| 2022 | Death in Paradise | Izzy Parker | 3 episodes |
| 2023–2024 | Everyone Else Burns | Fiona Lewis | Main role |
| 2023 | Henpocalypse! | Jen | Main role |
| 2024 | My Lady Jane | Princess Mary | Main role |
| 2026–present | Widow's Bay | Patricia Moyer | Main role |

=== Theatre ===
| Year | Title | Role | Venue |
|---|---|---|---|
| 2008 | The Children's Hour | Mary Tilford | Royal Exchange Manchester |
| 2008 | See How They Run | Ida | Royal Exchange Manchester |
| 2009 | A Miracle | Amy Aston | Jerwood Theatre, Royal Court Theatre |
| 2009 | The House of Special Purpose | Anastasia | Minerva Theatre |
| 2010 | The Whisky Taster | Nicola | Bush Theatre |
| 2010 | Marine Parade | Sally | Brighton Festival, as part of the English Touring Theatre |
| 2011 | Theatre Uncut - Open Heart Surgery | Lisa | Southwark Playhouse |
| 2011 | Lungs | W | The Crucible, Shoreditch Town Hall, part of Paines Plough's Roundabout season |
| 2011 | The Sound of Heavy Rain | Foxy O'Hara | The Crucible, Shoreditch Town Hall, part of Paines Plough's Roundabout season |
| 2013 | Port | Racheal Keats | Lyttelton Theatre, Royal National Theatre |
| 2013 | The Ritual Slaughter of George Mastromas | Louisa | Royal Court |
| 2014 | A Taste of Honey | Jo | Lyttelton Theatre, Royal National Theatre |
| 2015 | The Trial | Rosa, Cherry, Female Guard, Chastity, Girl, Tiffany | Young Vic |
| 2017 | The Glass Menagerie | Laura | Duke of York's Theatre, Edinburgh International Festival |
| 2017 | Anatomy of a Suicide | Anna | Royal Court |
| 2018 | Precisely, One for the Road, Mountain Language, Ashes to Ashes | Roger, Gila, Young Woman, Rebecca | Harold Pinter Theatre |
| 2019 | The End of History | Polly | Royal Court |
| 2019 | Blank | Various | Donmar Wharehouse, Royal Court |
| 2020 | All of It | Various | Royal Court, monologue |
| 2021 | The Two-Character Play | Clare | Hampstead Theatre |
| 2022 | Grey Man | Maya | Young Vic, also digital theatre short |
| 2023 | All of It | Various | Jerwood Theatre, Royal Court, one woman show |
| 2026 | Triumph | Iris | Almeida Theatre |

=== Radio ===
| Year | Title | Role | Notes |
|---|---|---|---|
| 2013 | Lungs | W | BBC Radio 3 play, adapted from stage |
| 2013 | Absolutely Delish | Charlotte | BBC Radio 4, episode 3: "Flying the Nest" |
| 2015 | The Stuarts | Charlotte Stuart | BBC Radio 4 historical drama, episode: "Charlotte Stuart: The Last Stuart" |
| 2016–2020 | Dot | Myrtle | BBC Radio 4 sitcom, written by Ed Harris |
| 2016 | Blood Sex and Money by Emile Zola | Satin | BBC Radio 4 historical drama based on Émile Zola's Les Rougon-Macquart novels, series 2- Sex |
| 2017 | I Confess | Anna | BBC Radio 4 drama |
| 2017 | Long Time Coming | Rachel | BBC Radio 4 drama |
| 2019 | Opening Pandora's Box | Writer, Lulu | BBC Radio 4 drama written by Katie Hims |
| 2019 | The Love Test | Kate | BBC Radio 4 comedy drama |
| 2019 | China Towns | Anna | BBC Radio 4 drama based on Arnold Bennett's Five Towns novels |
| 2020 | The English Lesson | Lola, student | BBC Radio 4 drama |
| 2023 | Spores | Cassie | BBC Radio 4 psychological horror |
| 2026 | Fork in the Road | Cherie Blair | BBC Radio 4, episode: "Cherie on Top" |

=== Video games ===
| Year | Title | Role | Notes |
|---|---|---|---|
| 2021 | The Good Life | Elizabeth Dickins, Rita Barrett, Virginia Yeats | Voice role |
| 2022 | Dragon Quest Treasures | Additional voices | English version |

== Awards and nominations ==
| Year (Note: The listed year refers to the date of the ceremony.) | Award | Category | Work | Result | Ref. |
|---|---|---|---|---|---|
| 2014 | Critics' Circle Theatre Award | Jack Tinker Award for Most Promising Newcomer | Port | Won | |
| 2017 | Laurence Olivier Awards | Best Actress in a Supporting Role | The Glass Menagerie | Nominated | |
| 2025 | British Academy Television Awards | Best Female Comedy Performance | Everyone Else Burns | Nominated | |
| 2026 | Critics' Choice Super Awards | Best Actress in a Horror Series, Limited Series, or Made-for-TV Movie | Widow's Bay | Won | |
| 2026 | Dorian Awards | Best Supporting TV Performance – Comedy | Widow's Bay | Won | |
| 2026 | TCA Awards | Individual Achievement in Comedy | Widow's Bay | Won | |
| 2026 | Primetime Emmy Awards | Outstanding Supporting Actress in a Comedy Series | Widow's Bay | Won | |
| 2026 | San Sebastián International Film Festival | Silver Shell for Best Leading Performance | Tender Loving Care | Won (Note: Shared with Asta Kamma August for Growth of the Soil.) | |
| 2026 | Gotham Independent Film Awards | Outstanding Supporting Performance | Tender Loving Care | Pending | |
| 2026 | British Independent Film Awards | Best Ensemble Performance | Tender Loving Care | Pending (Note: Shared with Marion Bailey, Paul Jesson and Alice Bailey Johnson) | |
