= A Miracle =

2009 play by Molly Davies

- Written by: Molly Davies
- Original language: English

Premiere
- Date premiered: 2009
- Place premiered: Royal Court Theatre, London

A Miracle by Molly Davies was her first professionally staged play and was first staged at the upstairs Jerwood Theatre at Royal Court Theatre in London in 2009 as part of the theatre's Young Writers Festival. It starred Russell Tovey, Kate O'Flynn, Sorcha Cusack and Gerard Horan.

== Overview ==
The plot follows the struggle of Amy Aston, a teenage single mother, as she struggles to bond with her unwanted baby daughter Cara in rural Norfolk. Amy works at a chicken factory whilst her grandmother, Val, looks after Cara. The young mother begins a tumultuous relationship with Gary Trudgill, a violent and traumatised soldier on sick leave. Gary's outbursts, in part a response to the treatment he receives from his own father, threaten to harm Cara. The play ends on a positive note, with Cara's survival being the miracle of the play's title.

== Cast ==
- Amy Aston: Kate O'Flynn
- Gary Trudgill: Russell Tovey
- Val, Amy's grandmother: Sorcha Cusack
- Rob, Gary's father: Gerard Horan

== Critical reception ==
Writing in The Daily Telegraph, Charles Spencer began by saying, "I'm in a tricky position here. There is nothing I can say about Molly Davies's remarkable play A Miracle that is going to make you want to see it. Almost throughout its 75 minute running time (it feels much longer) I was desperate to get out of the theatre myself", before adding, "But this is emphatically a drama that deserves and needs to be seen, not least by those politicians who endlessly bang on about our broken society". Spencer recalled that, "Babies don't tend to survive for long in Royal Court plays (Remember Edward Bond's Saved?) and poor Cara spends much of the time crying, horribly realistically, in her buggy, shredding the nerves of every parent in the audience", but found, "It's worth enduring, though, not only for the power and truth of both writing and performances, but also for the tentative glimmer of hope at the end". Assessing the cast's performances, he judged that "Kate O'Flynn brings an astonishingly raw vulnerability to the stage as Amy [...] Sorcha Cusack plays the grandmother with a robust humanity that warms this punishing play; Russell Tovey has a terrifying touch of the psycho about him as the squaddie, while Gerard Horton as his father shows how man hands on misery to man". Spencer concluded his review by writing, "With a bleakly atmospheric rural design by Patrick Burnier that is so real you can actually smell it and a tense, gutsy production by Lyndsey Turner, this proves a shattering full-length debut by 26-year-old Molly Davies".

Reviewing the play for The Guardian, Michael Billington gave it 3 stars out of five, saying that "while Molly Davies's writing shows real flair in its bony, Bond-like spareness and unnerving hints of violence, her play remains trapped inside the fashionable 70-minute format". He found that "Davies's strength is her feel for character and place" but also that "the characters lapse into self pity [....]". Billington judged that "[...] her dialogue has that wry, laconic quality you often find in East Anglian plays" adding that "Davies also vividly captures Amy's muddled feelings about motherhood: her resentment of an unwanted child combined with irrepressible familial instinct". He concluded his review by noting, "Even if this is only the sketch for the richer play Davies will one day write, she is well served by Lyndsey Turner's Theatre Upstairs production. Kate O'Flynn's Amy is a model of gawky despair while Russell Tovey's Gary has an edge of violence that, with memories of Bond's Saved in mind, makes you fear for the baby's survival. Sorcha Cusack as the commonsensical gran and Gerard Horan as an embittered victim of rural blight fill out a play that provides plenty of evidence of youthful talent but that also leaves you wanting more. Perhaps one day Davies might take the plunge and write a two act play".

In the Evening Standard, Nicholas de Jongh began his 4-star review by saying, "It may be set in a Norfolk village last year but Molly Davies's highly promising, first full-length play reminds me irresistibly of Edward Bond's 44-year-old Saved without the violence. In 28 scenes and 80 minutes Miss Davies offers a rural complement to Bond's landscape-vision of down-and-out south Londoners. She shows a flair for creating believable characters, who speak in a terse, unembroidered Norfolk dialect that left me wishing for surtitles". He praised both "Kate O'Flynn's beautiful rendering of passivity, selfishness and vulnerability" and the "fine, lumbering incoherence" of Russell Tovey's portrayal of Gary. De Jongh also noted the "alienated aggression" brought to the part of Gary's father by Gerard Horan, adding "Sorcha Cusack's believable Gran offers the only ray of cheerfulness". He judged that "Lyndsey Turner's in-the-round production on a stage needlessly carpeted with turf offers annoyingly impeded views, though scenes flow with seamless ease" but concluded his review by saying simply "Compelling".
