= Lucie Shorthouse =

English actress

- Born: Lucy Richenda Shorthouse; Nuneaton, Warwickshire, England
- Education: Selwyn College, Cambridge
- Occupation: Actor
- Years active: 2015–present

Lucy Richenda Shorthouse is an English actress. She won a WhatsOnStage Award for her performance in Everybody's Talking About Jamie. On television, she is known for her roles in the Channel 4 sitcom We Are Lady Parts (2021–2024) and the BBC series Henpocalypse! (2023) and Rebus (2024).

== Early life and education ==
Lucy Richenda Shorthouse was born in the Nuneaton and Bedworth area of Warwickshire and grew up in Tamworth, Staffordshire. Her family had moved to England from Kenya although her heritage is Ugandan.

Shorthouse attended the Polesworth School. Growing up, she took classes at the Wendy Morton Academy of Dance in Atherstone.

She went on to graduate from Selwyn College, Cambridge in 2012 with a Bachelor of Arts in English and Drama. At university, she was a member of Footlights. She then trained at the Italia Conti Academy of Theatre Arts until 2015.

== Career ==
After appearing on stage in productions such as The House of in Between at the Theatre Royal Stratford East and Roller Diner at the Soho Theatre, Shorthouse originated the role of Pritti Pasha in the coming-of-age musical Everybody's Talking About Jamie at the Sheffield Crucible in 2017, a role she would reprise for its West End run at the Apollo Theatre. For her performance, Shorthouse won the WhatsOnStage Award for Best Supporting Actress in a Musical.

Shorthouse had her first prominent television role in 2020 when she joined the main cast of the Sky One police procedural Bulletproof for its second series as Paige Pennington. The following year, she began playing band manager Momtaz in the Channel 4 sitcom We Are Lady Parts.

Shorthouse returned to the Sheffield Crucible in 2021 and 2022 for Talent and Rock / Paper / Scissors respectively. She also appeared in The Milk Train Doesn't Stop Here Anymore at the Charing Cross Theatre.

In 2023, Shorthouse led the BBC Two comedy Henpocalypse! as Zara opposite Callie Cooke. She also made a guest appearance in the ITVX true crime series The Long Shadow.

She has a leading role as DC Siobhan Clarke in the 2024 BBC Scotland series Rebus opposite Richard Rankin.

== Filmography ==
Year	Title	Role	Notes
2015, 2018	Doctors	Helen Cloverfield / Brittany Chambers	2 episodes
2017	Line of Duty	Melanie	Episode: "In the Trap"
2019	Cleaning Up	Jade	1 episode
2020–2021	Bulletproof	Paige Pennington	Main role (series 2–3)
2021–2024	We Are Lady Parts	Momtaz	Main role
2021	Echoes (short film)	Jen	Main role
2022	Ten Percent	Alissa Sawalha	1 episode
2023	Henpocalypse!	Zara	Main role
2023	The Long Shadow	Cindy Thornbury	1 episode
2024	Rebus	DC Siobhan Clarke	Main Role
2025	Midsomer Murders	Chloe Gillan	Episode: "Lawn of the Dead"

== Stage ==
Year	Title	Role	Notes
2016	The House of in Between	Dev	Theatre Royal Stratford East
2017	Roller Diner	Chantal	Soho Theatre, London
2017	Everybody's Talking About Jamie	Pritti Pasha	Crucible Theatre, Sheffield / Apollo Theatre, London
2021	Talent	Julie	Crucible Theatre, Sheffield
2022	Rock / Paper / Scissors	Zara	Crucible Theatre, Sheffield
2022	The Milk Train Doesn't Stop Here Anymore	Frances Black	Charing Cross Theatre, London

== Awards and nominations ==
Year	Award	Category	Work	Result	Ref.
2018	WhatsOnStage Awards	Best Supporting Actress in a Musical	Everybody's Talking About Jamie	Won	
2018	H100 Awards	Rising Star		Won	
2018	The Stage Debut Awards	Best West End Debut	Everybody's Talking About Jamie	Nominated	
