= Up There =

- Directed by: Zam Salim
- Written by: Zam Salim
- Produced by: Annalise Davis
- Starring: Burn Gorman; Kate O'Flynn; Aymen Hamdouchi; Jo Hartley; Kulvinder Ghir; Farren Morgan
- Edited by: Richard Graham
- Music by: Christian Henson
- Release dates: 18 November 2011 (Mannheim-Heidelberg); 16 November 2012
- Running time: 75 minutes
- Country: United Kingdom

Up There is a 2011 British feature film comedy-drama, written and directed by Zam Salim and starring Burn Gorman, Kate O'Flynn, Aymen Hamdouchi, Chris Waitt, Jo Hartley and Warren Brown. It is financed by the UK Film Council, BBC and Creative Scotland. It is based on Salim's short film "Laid Off". The film had its world premiere at the International Film Festival of Mannheim-Heidelberg on 18 November 2011. It won the award for Best Feature Film at the 2012 British Academy Scotland Awards, and was broadcast on BBC Two in August 2015.

== Cast ==
- Burn Gorman
- Kate O'Flynn
- Aymen Hamdouchi
- Kulvinder Ghir
- Farren Morgan
- Jo Hartley

== Plot ==
Martin addresses the camera to explain he died in a traffic accident and is now dead. He also indicates that the dead are not ghosts and cannot walk through walls or move things. Two 'carers' came to assist him into a waiting zone called a 're-start centre.' In this place Martin attends group counselling sessions where positive thoughts are encouraged. Martin tries to fake positivity and another dead person befriends him before the two are assigned roles as carers at a hospital to guide the newly dead.

Martin hopes that the new role will earn him credit that could lead to his being allowed 'up there', literally up a staircase to a zone that is presumably more pleasant than the re-start centre. Alas, only his colleague is promoted.

Martin is assigned a new co-worker, Rash, and starts to encounter difficult newly-dead clients, such as a criminal with a name he cannot pronounce who runs away. Rash is irritating, talks a lot and enjoys this strange afterlife far more than Martin. They set off to find the runaway and reach a seaside town. Martin meets a woman in a library, Liz, and realises he can read a book or newspaper alongside a living person if they turn the pages. She hides when another dead man appears - she used to know him and says he can't take a hint. His co-worker says Liz was a suicide.

Later, they spot the runaway and give chase, but lose him. They realise his Dad lives in town and is a 'starer': someone dead who does nothing except stare into space. The runaway isn't Polish (Wozcek) at all, but called Chick. His send-off is in the paper for the next morning and Rash wants to stay so Chick can say goodbye to his family. Martin wants to leave so he doesn't miss his assessment. He asks Liz if there is any route out of town except the last bus at 11. She suggests a boat. Later she rows with the dead man who is stalking her and then she apologises to Martin.

Later, in an all-night garage Martin sees Rash is following a couple who are a bit wild. In the back of their car he tells Martin they should stick with this couple as Mandy has to be up in front of a judge early so will drive them back to the city. Liz joins them and they all awkwardly observe the car couple have sex.

At Chick's mum's house, Chick tells Martin how his death was a mistake. Chick saw a group of lads chasing Rash (unnamed) and then he was hit. The car involved was a Fiat Punto. Martin begins to join the dots. Two young lads who have been copying Rash and perving at the living keep mocking Chick. Martin loses his temper and says Chick killed Rash. They back off.

Liz arrives and Martin invites her to return to the centre with him but she says no, she is leaving with her ex who she killed!

Martin and Chick meet up with Rash who doesn't realise who Chick is. Before Martin can get Chick in the car, Rash has seen the two younger lads and runs off to explain. The car starts and Rash turns. He recognises Chick. The car leaves without him.

Back in the city, Martin brings Chick in for processing. He attends his assessment. Afterwards, Chick finds him and says he'd like to talk to Rash. Martin finds out Rash's brother has recovered and fobs Chick off. Martin is called in for the result of us assessment and shown upstairs. He turns back, finds Chick and offers to help him find Rash. They go to a strip club. Rash has become a starer.

Martin tells Rash he was upset that his wife didn't kill herself when he died. He knows she let him go and he must let her go. Rash wakes up and comes out to talk to Chick. He is fine with Chick having killed him so long as he says it was a bigger, sturdier car he was driving!
