= Abraham Popoola =

British actor (born 1991)

- Born: 9 June 1991 (age 35); Hackney, London, England
- Education: Royal Academy of Dramatic Art
- Occupation: Actor
- Years active: 2014–present

Abraham Popoola (born 9 June 1991) is a British actor.

== Early life and education ==
Popoola was born on 9 June 1991 in Hackney, London, to Nigerian parents, from whom he learned basic Yoruba. He has two younger siblings. He graduated from the Royal Academy of Dramatic Art in 2016.

== Career ==
Popoola appeared in a production of Othello at the Tobacco Factory Theatre, winning the inaugural Stage Debut Award for Best Actor in a Play for his performance. He appeared in the "Pinter at the Pinter" season at the Harold Pinter Theatre in 2019, where he starred in productions of Party Time and Celebration. His performance earned praise in Variety's review of the production.

Popoola's early film credits included Jingle Jangle: A Christmas Journey, Cruella, and Morbius. In March 2021, he was cast in the Amazon Prime Video series The Rig. In August 2022, he was cast in the Netflix film Atlas, co-starring Jennifer Lopez, Simu Liu and Sterling K. Brown.

Popoola appeared in the Marvel Cinematic Universe film The Marvels in 2023, and in Ballerina, an instalment of the John Wick franchise. He appears in a main role in the Prime Video series Spider-Noir.

== Filmography ==
=== Film ===
Year	Title	Role	Notes	Ref(s)
2020	Jingle Jangle: A Christmas Journey	Rogers		
2021	Cruella	George		
2022	Morbius	Ryan		
2023	The Marvels	Dag		
2024	Atlas	Casca Decius		
2025	Ballerina	Frank		
2027	Shiver †		Post-production	

=== Television ===
Year	Title	Role	Notes	Ref(s)
2017	Will	Sir Francis Bacon's Bouncer	1 episode	
2017	Electric Dreams	Recycle Driver	1 episode	
2019	Les Misérables	Cochepaille	Miniseries, 1 episode	
2019	A Christmas Carol	Blacksmith	Miniseries, 1 episode	
2020	Breeders	Driver	1 episode	
2020	The Great	Alexei Rostov	2 episodes	
2020	Unprecedented	Theo	1 episode	
2021–2023	Starstruck	Jacob	2 episodes	
2022	Andor	North-1	2 episodes	
2022–2023	The Curse	Joey Boy	Main role, 6 episodes	
2023–2024	Extraordinary	Ade	Recurring role, 7 episodes	
2023–2025	The Rig	Easter Ayodeji	Main role, 12 episodes	
2025	Slow Horses	Tyson Bowman	3 episodes	
2026	Spider-Noir	Lonnie Lincoln / Tombstone	Main role, 8 episodes	

=== Audiobooks ===
Year	Title	Role	Notes	Ref(s)
2026	Harry Potter	Kingsley Shacklebolt	Order of the Phoenix, Half-Blood Prince, Deathly Hallows	

=== Video games ===
Year	Title	Role	Notes	Ref(s)
2024	Tales of Kenzera: Zau	GaGorib / Griot Lamp	Voice	

== Stage ==
Year	Title	Role	Theatre	Ref(s)
2017	Othello	Othello	Tobacco Factory Theatre	
2018	Julius Caesar	Trebonius	Bridge Theatre	
2019	Party Time/Celebration	Jimmy/Waiter	Harold Pinter Theatre	
2026	Archduke	Trifko	Royal Court Theatre	
