= Henpocalypse! =

British television series

- Genre: Comedy
- Written by: Caroline Moran
- Directed by: Jack Clough; Holly Walsh
- Starring: Kate O'Flynn; Lucie Shorthouse; Elizabeth Berrington; Callie Cooke; Lauren O'Rourke
- Country of origin: United Kingdom
- Original language: English
- No. of series: 1
- No. of episodes: 6

Production
- Executive producers: Phil Clarke; Helen Williams; Roberto Troni
- Producer: Imogen Cooper
- Production companies: BBC Studios; Various Artists Limited

Original release
- Network: BBC Two
- Release: 15 August – 19 September 2023

Henpocalypse! is a 2023 British comedy television series on that aired on BBC Two from 15 August to 19 September 2023.

== Synopsis ==
Unbeknownst to a group of Birmingham women on a hen-do in remote North Wales, and their hired male stripper, an apocalypse of crab measles threatens to wipe out human civilisation.

== Cast and characters ==
=== Main ===
- Lucie Shorthouse as Zara
- Callie Cooke as Shelly
- Elizabeth Berrington as Bern
- Kate O'Flynn as Jen
- Lauren O'Rourke as Veena

=== Supporting ===
- Catherine Ayers as Leonie
- George Somner as Gary
- Kaine Zajaz as Lee Rhind
- Mariam Haque as Nesbit
- Roya Amini as Kelly
- Tasha James as Donna
- Ben McGregor as Drew
- Danny Dyer as himself
- Jess as Barney the Dog

== Episodes ==
No.	Title	Directed by	Written by	Original release date	U.K. viewers (millions)
1	"Tits Up"	Holly Walsh / Jack Clough	Caroline Moran	15 August 2023	N/A
2	"Ends Of The Earth"	Jack Clough	Caroline Moran	22 August 2023	N/A
3	"Liquid Gold"	Jack Clough	Caroline Moran	29 August 2023	N/A
4	"Feel The Bern"	Jack Clough	Caroline Moran	5 September 2023	N/A
5	"Don't Tell The Bride"	Jack Clough	Caroline Moran	12 September 2023	N/A
6	"The Big Day"	Jack Clough	Caroline Moran	19 September 2023	N/A

== Production ==
A six-part series of 30 minute episodes was commissioned in July 2022 for BBC Two and BBC iPlayer. Executive producers on the series include Phil Clarke, Helen Williams and Roberto Troni. Written by Caroline Moran, the series has Holly Walsh & Jack Clough as a director. The series is produced by Phil Clarke and Jesse Armstrong’s production company, Various Artists Limited.

=== Casting ===
The main cast features Elizabeth Berrington, Lucie Shorthouse, Callie Cooke, Lauren O'Rourke, and Kate O'Flynn. Screenwriter Moran personally wrote Danny Dyer an email to request his cameo appearance.

=== Filming ===
Filming locations included Pensby Boys School on the Wirral. Filming also took place in North Wales, in early 2023. Locations in Wales include Abergele, with Llanfair Talhaiarn and Moel Famau, in the Clwydian Range also used.

== Broadcast ==
The programme premiered on BBC Two and the BBC iPlayer in the United Kingdom on 15 August 2023.

== Reception ==
David Craig in The Radio Times says "it's totally daft but unashamedly so, and there's a lot of fun to be had for those willing to go along for the ride".

Rebecca Nicholson in The Guardian said it was a "big, robust comedy", which "isn't for the faint-hearted".

It was a The Times Critics' choice saying the show was "coarse, amoral and seriously funny. Bring on series two."

Frances Taylor in The Radio Times calls it "bold, brash and a lot of fun".

The Daily Telegraph called it "gleefully broad and raucously entertaining".

Rachel Cooke in The New Statesman called the comedy on the show “relentlessly laboured” full of “faux-feminist puerility”.
