= Shiver (2027 film) =

2027 film by Tim Miller

- Directed by: Tim Miller
- Written by: Ian Shorr
- Produced by: Aaron Ryder; Andrew Swett; John Zaozirny; Matthew Vaughn
- Starring: Keanu Reeves; Callie Cooke; Steven Waddington; Stefan Kapičić; Abraham Popoola
- Music by: Tom Holkenborg
- Production companies: Ryder Picture Company; Bellevue Productions; Marv Studios
- Distributed by: Warner Bros. Pictures
- Release date: August 13, 2027
- Countries: United States; United Kingdom
- Language: English

Shiver is an upcoming science fiction survival film directed by Tim Miller and written by Ian Shorr. It stars Keanu Reeves, Callie Cooke, Steven Waddington, Stefan Kapičić, and Abraham Popoola.

== Cast ==
- Keanu Reeves
- Callie Cooke
- Steven Waddington
- Stefan Kapičić
- Abraham Popoola
- Nicholas Duvernay
- Anastasia Safonov
- Bobby Holland Hanton

== Production ==
In October 2025, it was announced that Warner Bros. Pictures was developing Shiver, a science fiction survival film with Tim Miller directing, Ian Shorr writing the script and Keanu Reeves starring. In March 2026, Callie Cooke, Steven Waddington, Stefan Kapičić, Abraham Popoola, Nicholas Duvernay, Anastasia Safonov, and Bobby Holland Hanton joined the cast as the female lead, with the film being untitled at that time. Principal photography began later that month in the Dominican Republic and the United Kingdom.

== Release ==
Shiver is scheduled to be released in the United States by Warner Bros. Pictures on August 13, 2027.
