= Lauren O'Rourke =

British actress

Lauren Kavanagh
- Born: Lauren O'Rourke; 1988 (age 37–38)
- Occupations: Actress, writer
- Years active: 2011–present

Lauren O'Rourke is a British actress best known for her roles in the sitcom Drifters as Laura on Channel 4 and as Carol in White Gold on BBC Two. She also appeared in the first series of Line of Duty in 2012.

== Career ==
In 2011, O'Rourke starred in and wrote Welcome to The Kerryman, her one-woman comedy show. The production was staged at that years Edinburgh Festival Fringe.

== Filmography ==
=== Film ===
Year	Title	Role	Notes
2011	The Inbetweeners Movie	Nicole	
2020	Liverpool Ferry	Nurse Lynn	Short film

=== Television ===
Year	Title	Role	Notes
2012	Line of Duty	Keely	Series 1; 3 episodes
2012	Citizen Khan	Barmaid	
2013	Doctors	Tish Brittern	
2013–2016	Drifters	Laura	
2014	Mount Pleasant	Chrissie	
2015	This Is England 90	Sonia	
2017–2019	White Gold	Carol	
2020	Man Like Mobeen	Tammy	Episode: "Permanent Exclusion"
2021	Complaints Welcome		Additional writer
2023	Henpocalypse!	Veena	
2024	Phoenix Rise	Bev	
2024	Daddy Issues	Twinky	
