= Dot and Bubble =

309 – "Dot and Bubble"
- Doctor Who episode
- Promotional title-card

Cast
- Doctor: Ncuti Gatwa – Fifteenth Doctor
- Companion: Millie Gibson – Ruby Sunday
- Others: Callie Cooke – Lindy Pepper-Bean; Eilidh Loan – Cooper Mercy; Aldous Ciokajlo Squire – Harry Tendency; Niamh Lynch – Hoochy Pie; Millie Kent – Valerie Nook; Billy Brayshaw – Blake Very Blue; Pete MacHale – Gothic Paul; Max Boast – Dr Pee; Elloise Bennett – Rotterdam Twin 1; Olivia Bennett – Rotterdam Twin 2; Tom Rhys Harries – Ricky September; Jack Forsyth-Noble – Weatherman Will; Milo Callaghan – Alan K Sullivan; Susan Twist – Penny Pepper-Bean; Ellie-Grace Cashin – Suzie Pentecost; Jamie Barnard – Brewster Cavendish

Production
- Directed by: Dylan Holmes Williams
- Written by: Russell T Davies
- Produced by: Vicki Delow
- Executive producers: Russell T Davies; Julie Gardner; Jane Tranter; Joel Collins; Phil Collinson
- Music by: Murray Gold
- Series: Series 14
- Running time: 43 minutes
- First broadcast: 1 June 2024

Chronology
← Preceded by "73 Yards"	Followed by → "Rogue"

"Dot and Bubble" is the fifth episode of the fourteenth series of the British science fiction television series Doctor Who. The episode was first broadcast on BBC One in the United Kingdom on 1 June 2024 and released on Disney+ in the United States on 31 May. It was written by Russell T Davies, who originally pitched it for the sixth series, and directed by Dylan Holmes Williams.

In the episode, the Fifteenth Doctor (Ncuti Gatwa) and his companion, Ruby Sunday (Millie Gibson), attempt to save the city of Finetime from human-eating slugs, primarily by communicating with Lindy Pepper-Bean (Callie Cooke) through social media.

The episode features themes of the effects of social media on society, racism, and elitism and has been compared by Davies and critics to the anthology series Black Mirror. The episode received positive reviews from critics, and was watched by 3.62 million viewers.

== Plot ==
Lindy Pepper-Bean lives in the city of Finetime, populated by white, wealthy young adults from nearby Homeworld and shielded from the dangerous Wild Woods surrounding it. They live through a social media interface, a literal bubble projected around their heads by floating "Dots", robots that also direct their movements. Lindy is unconcerned that several of her friends are missing and she blocks the Doctor when he tries to send her a warning. Ruby then appears in Lindy's bubble and coaxes her into dropping her bubble. Lindy sees giant slug-like creatures eating some residents but ignoring her and others.

The Doctor and Ruby instruct Lindy and her friends to evacuate Finetime via conduits leading to an underground river. Lindy is surprised to realise that Ruby and Doctor are physically together and only belatedly recognises the Doctor from his earlier warning. Lindy views a message from her mother Penny, whom the Doctor and Ruby recognise, though from different places. Lindy is eventually aided in person by another resident, Ricky September, an influencer she idolises. He reveals that, unlike the other residents, he turns his bubble off regularly and can function without it. He discovers Homeworld has already been consumed by the slugs but lies to Lindy that all is fine.

The Doctor realises that the slugs were created and bred within Finetime by the Dots, leading residents to their deaths in alphabetical order by surname. Lindy finds herself no longer able to control her Dot, as it reveals its sentience and attacks them. When Lindy is cornered, she reveals Ricky's birth name was Richard Coombes (C preceding P in the English alphabet), and abandons him to be killed by the Dot. Lindy meets with the few remaining fleeing residents that the Doctor and Ruby rescued earlier and lies to them about what happened to Ricky.

The Doctor offers to take Lindy and the other remaining survivors into the TARDIS to find them a new home, but they disdainfully refuse, implied to be because the citizens of Finetime are racist. He warns them that they will die if they stay on the planet, as the Wild Woods are dangerous, and begs them to let him save them. They ignore him and launch their boat onto the river, and the Doctor angrily and tearfully leaves with Ruby.

== Production ==
=== Development ===
The episode was written by showrunner Russell T Davies. He initially conceptualised the idea in 2009 when the upcoming showrunner Steven Moffat asked Davies to return to the programme after his initial departure and write an episode for the Eleventh Doctor (Matt Smith) and his companion Amy Pond (Karen Gillan). Davies ultimately pitched the episode to Moffat in April 2010 for the sixth series, but it was scrapped due to the budget constraints that the heavy visual effects would have required. Following a co-production deal with Disney that began in 2023 and allowed for an increased budget, the episode was finally able to be produced. Working titles for the episode included "irl" and "Monsters, Monsters Everywhere". The episode explored the reliance of Generation Z on social media while featuring underlying themes of racism and elitism. The Finetime residents' rejection of the Doctor in the final scene has been widely interpreted as due to his race, a notion confirmed by Davies as intentional. Davies compared the episode to Black Mirror but with more freedom; several critics also noted the similarities in tone and premise. Screen Rant 's Brennan Klein likened the premise to the episodes "Fifteen Million Merits" (2011) and "Nosedive" (2016).

=== Filming ===
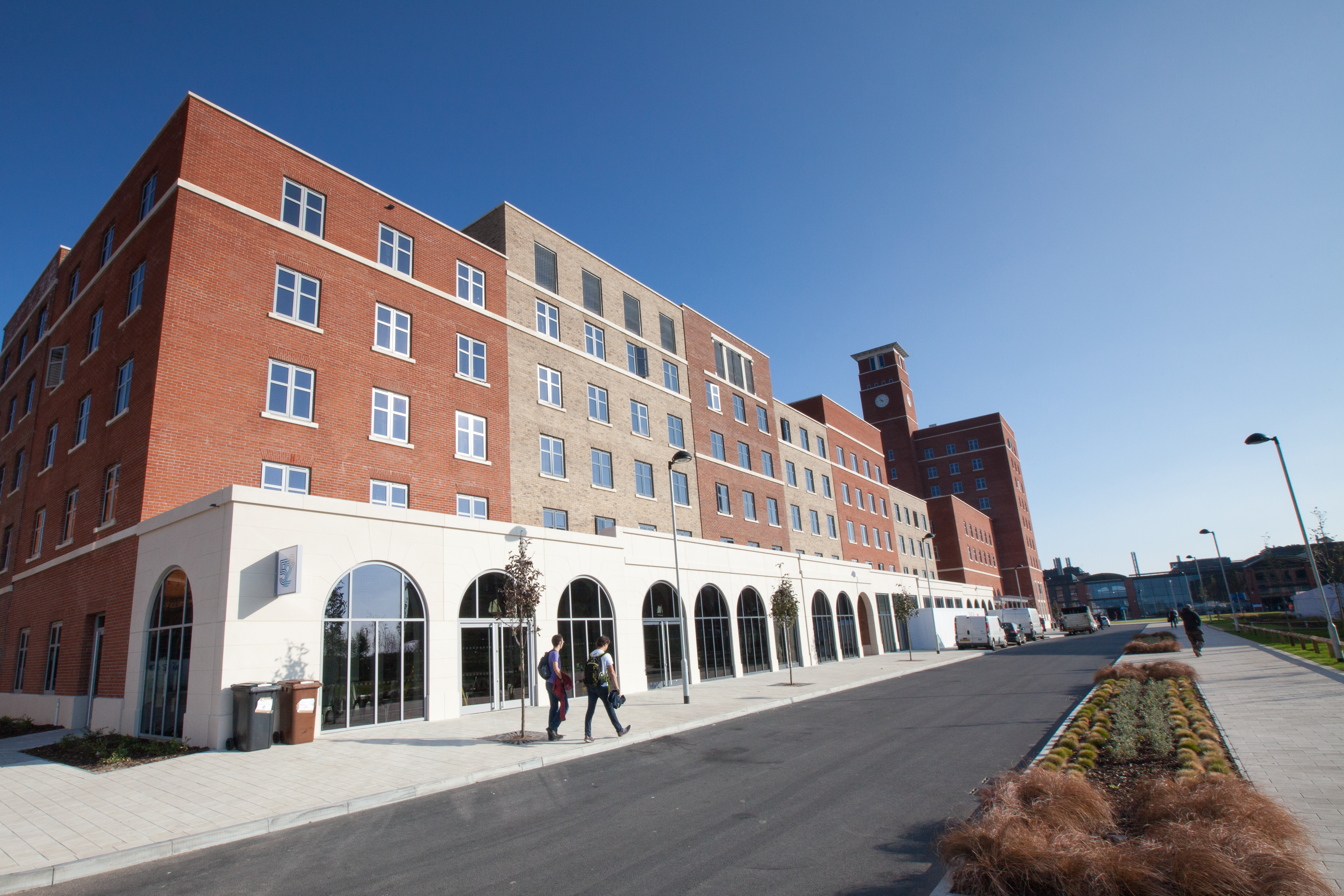
Swansea University Bay Campus

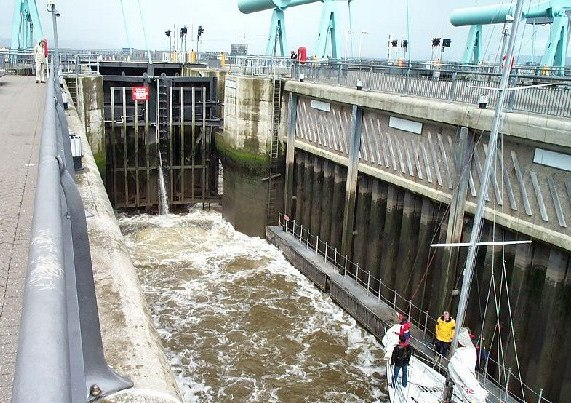
Cardiff Bay Barrage

The passenger boat Daffodil with the TARDIS beyond.

Swansea University Bay Campus and the Cardiff Bay Barrage were used as the primary filming locations for the episode.

The episode was directed by Dylan Holmes Williams and was the second episode of the fourteenth series to be produced, though the final shot of the episode was the very first scene to be filmed by Gatwa for the fourteenth series. It was filmed in the series' first production block along with the previous episode, "73 Yards". Filming took place in December 2022 and January 2023; locations included the Cardiff Bay Barrage and Swansea University Bay Campus in Wales. Because the weather on set was unpredictable, Jack Forsyth-Noble filmed multiple fictional weather forecasts for the episode as Weatherman Will. Millennium FX designed the slug creatures, which took three people to operate during filming.

=== Casting ===
Similar to the previous episode, Ncuti Gatwa was still filming Sex Education when the episode began production, limiting his availability, but he still had a larger presence than he held in "73 Yards". The episode instead focused on Callie Cooke as Lindy Pepper-Bean. Tom Rhys Harries appeared in the episode as Ricky September. Similar to other episodes of the series, Susan Twist guest-starred as another seemingly disparate character, this time as Penny Pepper-Bean. The remainder of the guest cast included Eilidh Loan, Aldous Ciokajlo Squire, and Niamh Lynch, among others. Only white actors were cast in the guest roles due to the episode's theme of racism; Davies was unsure when or if viewers would notice the lack of diversity before the final scene.

== Broadcast and reception ==
Professional ratings
Aggregate scores
Source	Rating
Rotten Tomatoes (Tomatometer)	93%
Rotten Tomatoes (Average Rating)	7.6/10
Review scores
Source	Rating
Digital Spy	2/5 stars
Empire	3/5 stars
Evening Standard	3/5 stars
i	2/5 stars
IGN	5/10
Radio Times	3/5 stars
The Independent	4/5 stars
Total Film	4/5 stars
Vulture	4/5 stars

=== Broadcast ===
"Dot and Bubble" was first released in the United Kingdom on BBC iPlayer on 1 June 2024 followed by a broadcast on BBC One later in the day. Disney+ released the episode simultaneously in the United States on 31 May. Disney also handled international distribution of the episode outside of the United Kingdom and Ireland.

=== Ratings ===
The UK broadcast of "Dot and Bubble" brought in overnight viewing figures of 2.12 million. The episode received a total of 3.62 million consolidated viewers across 7 days, and a total of 4.42 million consolidated viewers across 28 days.

=== Critical reception ===
On the review aggregator website Rotten Tomatoes, 93% of 15 critics' reviews are positive, with an average rating of 7.6/10. The website's consensus reads: "A withering treatment of the terminally online with slithering monsters thrown in for good measure, "Dot and Bubble" is another memorable adventure for The Doctor."

Total Film writer Will Salmon compared the virtual aspect of the episode to media productions during COVID-19 as well as the dystopian aspect to that of "Gridlock" (2007). Cooke's performance in the episode was praised by Salmon for expressing the "vulnerability" and "complexity" of her character. Den of Geek's Stefan Mohamed wrote about comparisons between the episode and Black Mirror beyond just the plot and saying the two are also similar with their production design. Authoring a review for The Independent, Ed Power described the episode as a crossover between Black Mirror and a David Attenborough documentary.

Writing for Digital Spy, Rebecca Cook felt that the episode was worse than the previous two episodes, "73 Yards" and "Boom", criticising Davies' writing of Generation Z dialogue. Cook said she was interested in what the episode would have looked like prior to the Disney co-production. Cook later said that the episode helped her identify a trend of disappointing villains throughout the series. Morgan Jeffery, reviewing the episode for Radio Times, stated the episode "feels like a victim of its own ambition", believing that it had an "abundance of ideas" but "overextends itself" in the process. Jeffery however, also commended Cooke's acting as well as that of Gatwa, despite his limited screen time, and described the episode as "undeniably fascinating." IGN writer Robert Anderson spoke similarly of the episode and believed it would have been better if Gatwa and Gibson had had more screen time. Jordan King of Empire gave the episode three out of five, praising the performances but criticising some of its dialogue as dated and through heavy-handed delivery. Vicky Jessie gave the episode three out of five.

Mohamed also felt that the underlying racism shown by characters in "Dot and Bubble" was the most important part of the episode, but wished for such matters to be raised by a non-white writer in the future. Isobel Lewis with The New York Times furthered this point explaining that a character referred to the TARDIS as "Voodoo", which has been used as a racial slur. Stephen Kelly offered a negative review, criticising how the acknowledgment of Gatwa as the first black Doctor was raised through a "cheap twist".
