= Callie Cooke =

English actress (born 1992)

- Born: 23 October 1993 (age 32); Leicester, England, United Kingdom
- Education: ArtsEd (BA)
- Occupation: Actress
- Years active: 2015–present
- Known for: "Dot and Bubble"; Henpocalypse!

Callie Cooke (born 23 October 1993) is a British actress. She was nominated for an Evening Standard Theatre Award in 2015. On television, she is best known for her role in the BBC Two comedy Henpocalypse! (2023).

== Early life and education ==
Cooke studied at the Arts Educational Schools, graduating with a Bachelor of Arts in Acting.

== Career ==
Cooke made her professional stage debut in Firebird, which ran at Hampstead Theatre and Trafalgar Studios in 2015. For her performance, Cooke was nominated for the Emerging Talent Award at the Evening Standard Theatre Awards.

Cooke made her television debut in a 2016 episode of the BBC medical soap opera Doctors. She returned to the Hampstead Theatre for Filthy Business in 2017 and The Strange Death of John Doe in 2018.

Cooke appeared in the BBC Three series Overshadowed and the BBC One drama Informer, and began playing Islene in the Sky Atlantic series Britannia. Cooke made her feature film debut in the 2020 comedy Blithe Spirit. That same year, she played Kimberley Doyle in the Netflix mystery series The Stranger and played Nadia in the Channel 4 drama Adult Material.

In 2022, Cooke had a number of main television roles in the BBC series Rules of the Game as Tess Jones, Cheaters as Esther, and Peacock as Carly, as well as the Disney+ Star series Wedding Season as Leila. The following year, she starred as Shelly opposite Lucie Shorthouse in the BBC Two comedy series Henpocalypse!. In 2024, she appeared as Lindy Pepper-Bean in the Doctor Who episode "Dot and Bubble" and as Steph in the ITV comedy series Piglets.

== Filmography ==
=== Film ===
Year	Title	Role	Notes
2020	Blithe Spirit	Googie Withers	
2025	F1	Jodie	
2027	Shiver	TBA	Filming

=== Television ===
Year	Title	Role	Notes
2016	Doctors	Belle Curtis	Episode: "What You Don't Know"
2017	Strike	Carianne	Episode: "The Cuckoo's Calling: Part 1"
2017	Overshadowed	Sky	4 episodes
2018–2021	Britannia	Islene	5 episodes
2018	Informer	Natalie Markham	3 episodes
2019	Halfbreed	Brogan	Web
2020	The Stranger	Kimberley Doyle	6 episodes
2020	Adult Material	Nadia	4 episodes
2022	Rules of the Game	Tess Jones	4 episodes
2022	Cheaters	Esther	17 episodes
2022	Peacock	Carly	3 episodes
2022	Wedding Season	Leila	8 episodes
2023	Henpocalypse!	Shelly	6 episodes
2024	Doctor Who	Lindy Pepper-Bean	Episode: "Dot and Bubble"
2024	Piglets	Steph	6 episodes
2025	Surface	Margot	Season 2

== Stage ==
Year	Title	Role	Notes
2015	Firebird	Tia	Hampstead Theatre / Trafalgar Studios, London
2017	Filthy Business	Bernice	Hampstead Theatre, London
2018	The Strange Death of John Doe	Anna / Rae	Hampstead Theatre, London
2025	Christmas Day	Maude	Almeida Theatre, London

== Awards and nominations ==
Year	Award	Category	Work	Result	Ref.
2016	Evening Standard Theatre Awards	Emerging Talent Award	Firebird	Nominated	
