= Drifters (TV series) =

British television sitcom (2013–2016)

- Genre: Sitcom
- Created by: Jessica Knappett
- Written by: Jessica Knappett; Phoebe Waller-Bridge; Joe Tucker; Lloyd Woolf; Emerald Fennell; Ben Knappett
- Directed by: Simon Delaney; Tom Marshall; Al Campbell
- Starring: Jessica Knappett; Lydia Rose Bewley; Lauren O'Rourke
- Opening theme: "Leeds United" by Amanda Palmer
- Country of origin: United Kingdom
- Original language: English
- No. of series: 4
- No. of episodes: 24

Production
- Executive producers: Simon Wilson; Damon Beesley; Iain Morris
- Producer: Sam Pinnell
- Running time: 23 minutes
- Production company: Bwark Productions

Original release
- Network: E4
- Release: 31 October 2013 – 14 November 2016

Drifters is a British sitcom created by Jessica Knappett. It stars Knappett, Lydia Rose Bewley, and Lauren O'Rourke. Drifters follows the lives of cousins Meg and Bunny (Knappett and Bewley) and their friend Laura (O’Rourke) who live in Leeds following their graduation from university. E4 broadcast four series, between 2013 and 2016.

== History ==
The series first aired on E4 on 31 October 2013. On 9 May 2014, Channel 4 announced they had ordered a second series of Drifters. The new series began airing on E4 on 23 October 2014 and concluded on 27 November 2014. It began transmission on 23 October 2014, with each episode of the series premièring a week before its initial E4 broadcast on 4oD. On 9 June 2015, Channel 4 announced that a third series had been commissioned. It began broadcasting on 22 October 2015 and finished on 26 November 2015. In March 2016, Knappett confirmed that a fourth series had been commissioned. It began broadcasting on 10 October 2016. In June 2017, Knappett confirmed no more episodes would be made.

== Cast ==
- Meg - Jessica Knappett, protagonist
- Bunny - Lydia Rose Bewley, Meg's cousin
- Laura - Lauren O'Rourke, Meg & Bunny's best friend
- Frank - Bob Mortimer, Meg's father
- Jenny - Arabella Weir, Meg's mother
- Mark - Philip McGinley, Meg's ex-boyfriend
- Gary - Bobby Hirston, Laura's partner
- Malcolm - Nick Mohammed, Meg, Bunny & Laura's employer
- Scott - Brett Goldstein, Meg's neighbour
- James - Sam Jackson, Meg's younger brother
- Sara - Alice Barlow, James' wife
- Hot & Cold - Perry Fitzpatrick, Meg's casual relationship

== Episodes ==
Series	Episodes	Originally released	
Series	Episodes	First released	Last released
1	6	31 October 2013	28 November 2013
2	6	23 October 2014	27 November 2014
3	6	22 October 2015	26 November 2015
4	6	10 October 2016	14 November 2016

=== Series 1 (2013) ===
No. overall	No. in series	Title	Directed by	Written by	Original release date	Ref.
1	1	"Home"	Simon Delaney	Jessica Knappett	31 October 2013	
Twenty-four-year-old Meg and her cousin Bunny return home to Leeds, having cut short by half their post-university gap year trip around India. At the airport, they see Meg's stalker-ish ex-boyfriend Mark and manage to avoid him and meet their best friend Laura. Arriving home by bus, Meg is disappointed that her parents Frank and Jenny do not welcome her home and are instead congratulating her younger brother James on acquiring his new job and car. Meg is horrified when Mark shows up and informs her that he works for Frank and also on seeing that her bedroom is now a walk-in wardrobe. Despite her not contacting Mark during her six months away, he does not accept that they are no longer a couple and has moved her possessions into his rented flat in Headingley. She reluctantly moves in with Mark - telling him, Bunny and Laura that they are not a couple. Laura is unhappy with her partner Gary and insults him many times. Meg goes back to work for her old boss, Malcolm, whom Laura also works for; Bunny also takes a job with him. At a street stand, all four promote a tranket - a travel slanket - which is a slanket plus earplugs, blow-up headrest and eye mask.
2	2	"Scabies"	Simon Delaney	Jessica Knappett	31 October 2013	
Bunny and Laura are amazed when a man asks Meg on a date while they are on the street promoting a smartphone. Laura has scabies and Bunny says that she is depressed. The girls gatecrash what they think is a party, later realising it is a wake for Eddie, a young man who committed suicide. Meg catches scabies and has a one-night stand with Eddie's brother.
3	3	"Work Experience"	Simon Delaney	Jessica Knappett	7 November 2013	
Meg is starts an internship at local radio station 109.2 Pennine Hits. She is initially pleased, but disappointed when she discovers that the work is menial and unpaid. She is sacked for saying something inappropriate live on air. Laura suspects Gary of cheating on her, because she recently dreamt that he did. She goes him expecting to walk on him with another woman, but he is playing video games. She is disappointed that he prefers to continue gaming rather than be fellated by her. She dreams that she is enjoying sex with Malcolm, and is pleased when she wakes from the dream in bed with Gary, accepting that dreams are not real. Bunny is bored, spending the day alone in the flat. She accidentally locks herself out. Meg comes home, then Bunny draws a mural of herself on an inside wall of the lounge.
4	4	"Dry Run"	Simon Delaney	Jessica Knappett	14 November 2013	
Bunny and Laura are appalled when they realise Meg has not had sex in nearly a year. At their urging, Meg agrees to be less choosy and pick someone to have sex with who should be grateful because he is less attractive than her. She decides to have sex with Tom, an unappealing university classmate of Bunny's. However, she decides against having sex with him after he tells her that he wants to keep their sexual encounter secret. Bunny thinks she is in love with her latest flame Hugh, a much older man. Meg and Laura cannot understand her attraction towards an ordinary-looking man who is well into middle age. Bunny ends the fling due to feeling uncomfortable after he informs her that he was her teacher at junior school. Laura is uncharacteristically enthusiastic about her work, selling tickets in a "win this car" promotion. Meg is horrified at Laura fixing the raffle to win the car for herself.
5	5	"Friend Night Stand"	Simon Delaney	Jessica Knappett	21 November 2013	
Meg makes a new Australian friend, Ellie, after meeting her at a wedding. Meg brings her back to the flat and her bed. Bunny and Laura think Ellie is a lesbian. Bunny is enjoying a passionate fling with Cillian, whom Laura and Meg dislike. At a gathering to celebrate James' 21st birthday, Frank and Jenny think Meg is coming out. Laura is invited to a burlesque club by a Bradford City A.F.C. player who wrongly believes her to be one of the dancers there. Ellie is attracted to Bunny rather than Meg; Bunny and Ellie dance, kiss and leave together. Gary punches the footballer whilst Laura is lapdancing him, then punches Cillian, reigniting Laura's attraction to Gary.
6	6	"Nineties Night"	Simon Delaney	Jessica Knappett	28 November 2013	TBA
Mark reinvents himself as a DJ and hires Meg to help out at his 90s night. She is surprised that Pat Sharp, the host of 90s TV show Fun House, is there. On the night, she finds herself attracted to Mark. Meg and Mark decide to become a couple again. His attractive new girlfriend, Fay - who runs the nightclub - walks in on them kissing and ends their relationship. At home during the same night, Meg's attraction to him quickly fades. Meg tries to encourage Fay to get back together with Mark, but Fay does not want him. Whilst trying to raise money to pay the rent by selling their clothes online, Bunny accidentally reveals her breasts. She is pleased to be hired by a middle-aged man to life-model nude for him, with Laura accompanying her as her "agent". Bunny likes and buys the painting from the artist.

=== Series 2 (2014) ===
No. overall	No. in series	Title	Directed by	Written by	Original release date	Ref.
7	1	"Rock N Roll"	Tom Marshall	Jessica Knappett	23 October 2014	N/A
Meg is upset when her parents announce a trial separation. She is attracted to her neighbour Scott. Frank stays at Mark's; Jenny dresses young. The couple later reconcile. Bunny is enjoying a fling with Benji, the banjo player from unsigned folk band quintet The New Harvesters - and tries to join the band. The band throw them both out and he returns to being an estate agent - which makes Bunny no longer want him. Laura falsely claims that Gary is a Paralympian and veteran of the War in Afghanistan after she injures him when she hits him with her car.
8	2	"Truth or Dare"	Tom Marshall	Jessica Knappett and Phoebe Waller-Bridge	30 October 2014	N/A
Meg is horrified when she wakes up in bed with Mark and realises that they had sex. After a one-night stand with David, Bunny feels something familiar about the young man's house. She realises when she sees his father, Michael, there that she had on a previous occasion had sex with Michael there. Meg tries to organise a girls' night in, as they are all broke. Laura and Bunny insist they play spin the bottle and Truth or Dare?. Meg and Bunny compete for their handsome neighbour Scott. Meg and Mark unintentionally interrupt Bunny's seduction of Scott, but they have sex anyway. Mark rejects Meg's attempt to initiate sex with him, despite having an erection.
9	3	"Goole"	Tom Marshall	Jessica Knappett and Joe Tucker and Lloyd Woolf	6 November 2014	N/A
Meg realises that everyone she knows is on the new dating app BangR. She travels to Goole to meet a man called Chris via the app - and pretends to be local in order to not look desperate. Chris rejects her when he finds out that she lives in Leeds. Laura finds out that Gary is on BangR - and tells his their relationship is over and they each go on dates at the same time in the same restaurant - and compete with each other to have the better date. They decide to escape through the toilet window in order to avoid paying their bills - and they get back together. Bunny causes herself an allergic reaction in order to spend time with a doctor who rejected her on BangR. The girls quit BangR.
10	4	"Leia"	Tom Marshall	Jessica Knappett	13 November 2014	N/A
Beautiful, free-spirited Leia arrives. Meg and Bunny know Leia from their trip to India, and everyone thinks she is amazing - except Meg. Leia is a freegan - and the girls go skipping. They later go to an illegal rave, where Meg is arrested for exposing her vulva to policemen who close down the rave. Leia wants a threesome with Mark and Meg, but Meg declines the offer. Leia leaves after being insulted by Meg and having an argument with Laura.
11	5	"Hen Don't"	Tom Marshall	Jessica Knappett	20 November 2014	N/A
When Gary and Laura arrive at Gary's uncle Nige's wedding, Nige's new young Ukrainian fiancée leaves him for a rich man whom she met on the plane. The wedding is 80% paid for, so Gary and Laura take the opportunity to marry very cheaply by taking the former couple's place. Laura puts Meg in charge of the hen do on the same weekend that she is going for a romantic break with Scott at the same hotel. Laura decides not to marry.
12	6	"Meg's New Job"	Tom Marshall	Jessica Knappett	27 November 2014	N/A
The three girls start different jobs. Bunny makes online fashion advice videos, but gets into trouble at the jobcentre for doing paid work whilst claiming jobseekers' allowance. Laura works in a nightclub with Malcolm, but she falls over. Meg gets a new job at an international human rights charity, but upsets her boss.

=== Series 3 (2015) ===
No. overall	No. in series	Title	Directed by	Written by	Original release date	Ref.
13	1	"Roomies"	Al Campbell	Jessica Knappett	22 October 2015	N/A
Mark decides to move out of the flat, which is great for Meg because she wants Bunny to move in. Bunny gets a part in a play, which involves a sex scene with a co-star whom she hates. Meg, her parents, Laura and Mark attend the performance of the play. Laura and Gary set out to search for a new flat together, but Laura soon decides that she wants to live with Meg. Meg wrongly assumes that Mark is gay. Mark moves out, taking his possessions with him - and Bunny moves in. Laura no longer wants to move in, because Mark took a lot of things with him.
14	2	"Skint"	Al Campbell	Jessica Knappett	29 October 2015	N/A
The girls' quit their jobs advertising for a mobile phone company in the High Street - and their finances are at rock bottom. They go to a nightclub with the intention of getting men to buy them drinks. When there is not even enough money for food, Meg goes back to the house of a young man she met in the club in order to eat food from his fridge. Bunny has a part in a sofa television commercial that she believes requires mastery of a regional accent. Laura tries for a job as a waitress at Uncle Sam's Saturday Shack, but the boss does not want her. Laura gets the boss in their last jobs, Malcolm, to take them all back by her going on a date with him.
15	3	"Vanilla"	Al Campbell	Jessica Knappett	5 November 2015	N/A
The girls are promoting Intimatez condoms at a stand in the High Street when Meg meets an old school friend who has done very well for herself. Re-kindling that friendship brings Meg an opportunity to work for her, but she does very badly at her interview. Gary thinks Laura is vanilla, and he reveals his enthusiasm for MILF porn. Laura tries to roleplay a MILF, but does it badly wrong. Bunny is on the run from her father, having maxed out her emergency credit card.
16	4	"Hot & Cold"	Al Campbell	Jessica Knappett	12 November 2015	N/A
Meg is having a fling with a young man whom she nicknames "Hot & Cold". She does not know if he is her boyfriend or just her sex buddy. Bunny thinks she may have found a way in to the world of the theatre by selling food there, but her efforts to become an actress fail. Laura is furious when Gary takes a job in Glasgow, leaving her alone on her birthday.
17	5	"Plus One"	Al Campbell	Jessica Knappett	19 November 2015	N/A
Meg has a test for sexually transmitted infections. She needs to quickly find a man to be her plus one for her younger brother James' engagement brunch, at which both families will be attending. That is because she has falsely claimed that she has a boyfriend whom she will be bringing. Laura is horrified when Gary's obnoxious, arsonist best friend Maggot comes to stay with them. Laura tries to fix Meg up with Maggot and Bunny tries to fix Meg up with Scott. Scott, Hot & Cold and Maggot arrive separately to the brunch, confusing the attendees as to which of them (if any) is her boyfriend. Maggot deliberately sets his hands alight. Meg receives a text message informing her that she has gonorrhea, which she announces. Scott leaves, she tells Hot & Cold to leave and Maggot is ejected by a waiter.
18	6	"Wedding"	Al Campbell	Jessica Knappett	26 November 2015	N/A
It is James' wedding day at a country house. and Meg is determined not to feel bad about being single. She falsely claims that she does not want to marry. She is horrified at not having been asked to be a bridesmaid, especially after finding out that Laura is one of the bridesmaids. Bunny and Laura say that weddings are the best place to have sex. Bunny separately tries to chat up three of the guests: a married man, her cousin Henry and Callum, who is 15. Callum's mother warns her off him, and Bunny has sex with one of the catering staff in the kitchen. Meg is in charge of table decorations. She has chosen to include live goldfish, which die. She hides them in her hat and has difficulty disposing of them. She goes to the roof of the house and the guests outside wrongly assume that she is going to jump off. She is joined by Frank, who throws the hat full of fish off the roof. Bunny and Laura tell her that the guests think that she is going to kill herself, and she comes down. Meg, Bunny and Laura do a dance routine in front of the guests, which ends with Meg falling on the floor.

=== Series 4 (2016) ===
No. overall	No. in series	Title	Directed by	Written by	Original release date	Ref.
19	1	"Halloween"	Al Campbell	Jessica Knappett	10 October 2016	N/A
Meg has been seeing Andrew, a feminist, for a five days. She is frustrated and confused by his refusal to have sex with her. Laura starts work at a call centre, and is delighted to see that all her colleagues are handsome young men. She phones Gary to tell his that their relationship is over, but he refuses to accept it. She tells her hot new colleagues that she is going to Meg and Bunny's sexy Halloween house party - and invites them all. Meg is not keen on throwing a party. Laura is disappointed that Bunny only invites Scott and Meg does not invite anyone. Laura is annoyed when Gary arrives at her workplace, posing as a courier. As the party is about to start, Bunny wears a red robe and Laura dresses as a devil. Meg dresses as a man to represent the patriarchy, until Bunny and Laura convince her to change into a long white shirt. Andrew arrives in a black fur cape. Gary arrives in a Santa suit. Bunny is pleased when Scott arrives (with tribal markings), but disappointed when she sees that he has brought his new girlfriend Lizzie. The punch tastes very unpleasant, because it consists of beer, absinthe, whisky, rum, wine, orange squash and milk. Bunny, who claims to be psychic, holds a séance. Bunny manipulates tarot cards to claim that Scott and Lizzie's relationship will soon end. Bunny then claims to contact Gary's uncle Nigel, who died a few weeks ago. Lizzie is angry at finding out from Bunny that Scott has had sex with her and with Meg. Meg and Andrew go to her room, where they have sex. Meg climaxes within seconds, then loses interest. Five of Laura's colleagues arrive at the door; seconds later, Meg, Andrew and Bunny come into the room. They all see Laura having sex with Gary. Bunny, Meg and Andrew leave the room as the colleagues leave the house. Laura ejects Gary.
20	2	"The Third Way"	Al Campbell	Jessica Knappett	17 October 2016	N/A
Meg finds Andrew boring and she is not attracted to him. She tries to ghost him, but he continues to text her. He takes her to a 15-course dinner at a restaurant. She has sex with Hot & Cold, who recommends her the "third way" She tells Andrew about this, but he rejects it, and breaks up with her. She goes to Hot & Cold's flat to have sex with him, but he turns her away because he is having sex with another woman. Laura tries to break up with Gary, and moves in with Meg and Bunny. However, she continues to have sex with him, and later moves back in with him.
21	3	"Big Break"	Al Campbell	Jessica Knappett and Emerald Fennell	24 October 2016	N/A
Bunny plays a minor role as a prostitute who is murdered in a subway. A film producer casts her as a biochemist in an exploitation film with cage fighter Alex Reid. Bunny hires Laura as her agent. Meg does work experience on set and Laura is hired as an extra. Bunny is sacked, so Laura is hired to continue her role. Laura becomes Alex's agent; she also gets Bunny a television role. Laura finds out about sick pay, so she pretends to be ill to take time off from the call centre.
22	4	"Homeless"	Al Campbell	Jessica Knappett and Emerald Fennell	31 October 2016	N/A
Meg plans to make money by subletting the flat to a family whilst the girls stay at Frank and Jenny's house whilst they are away. When they go there, they find that Frank and Jenny have changed the locks. Laura tries to get in with the bank card of the account that has most of their money on, but it breaks. They fail in their attempts to stay at their flat whilst the family are there, then at Scott's, then at Gary's. They fall asleep in a bunker at a golf club - where Meg and Laura are hit by a golf ball each in the morning. The girls attend their class of 2007 school reunion, where they try to find someone who will let them stay with them that night. Whilst Meg stands on the stage, a tooth falls out of her mouth. Seconds later, Laura trips and accidentally pulls aside a curtain, revealing Bunny having sex with a former classmate.
23	5	"Sober"	Al Campbell	Jessica Knappett	7 November 2016	N/A
Meg, Laura and Bunny decide to detox for a while. Even better, they sign up for a charity mud-running event, but then along come some distractions.
24	6	"Funeral"	Al Campbell	Jessica Knappett	14 November 2016	N/A
When Meg and Bunny's Grandma Primrose dies, and they organise the funeral. They move it to Friday, one day earlier than previously planned, in order to go to Glastonbury that weekend with Laura. Just before they intend to leave, Frank tells them that their tickets were for 2014.

== DVD releases ==
The first series of Drifters was released on 25 November 2013 by 4DVD despite the sixth episode not being broadcast until 28 November 2013. The second series was released on 8 December 2014 by 4DVD.
