= Young James Herriot =

Television series

- Genre: Drama
- Created by: Johnny Byrne; Kate Croft
- Written by: Ann McManus; Eileen Gallagher
- Directed by: Michael Keillor
- Starring: Iain De Caestecker; Amy Manson; Ben Lloyd-Hughes; Tony Curran; Gary Lewis; Natasha Little
- Country of origin: United Kingdom
- Original language: English
- No. of series: 1
- No. of episodes: 3

Production
- Production location: Glasgow
- Running time: 60 minutes
- Production company: Koco Drama

Original release
- Network: BBC One
- Release: 18 December – 20 December 2011

Young James Herriot is a three-part British television drama based on the early life of veterinary surgeon James Herriot. It is part of a series of movies and television series based on Herriot's novels. It features Iain De Caestecker as the title character following his arrival at veterinary college, alongside Amy Manson and Ben Lloyd-Hughes as fellow students Whirly Tyson and Rob McAloon. Directed by Michael Keillor and written by Ann McManus and Eileen Gallagher, it was a Koco Drama production for the BBC which first aired on BBC One in December 2011.

== Plot ==
The plot is based on the early life and studies of veterinary surgeon James Alfred Wight, known for his autobiographical books, under the pen name James Herriot, which were the basis for the BBC television series All Creatures Great and Small. The series is set in the 1930s at the Glasgow Veterinary College, where Herriot (Iain De Caestecker) has arrived to train as a veterinary surgeon. It focuses on his relationship with his new-found friends Emma 'Whirly' Tyson (Amy Manson) and Rob McAloon (Ben Lloyd-Hughes). They lodge together at the home of Elspeth Munro (Natasha Little).

Also featured are Jenny Muirhead (Joanna Vanderham), who is the only other female student at the college, and lecturers Professor Gunnell (Gary Lewis) and Professor Richie (Tony Curran). Topics which feature in the story lines include the subjugation of women, the treatment of students by Professor Gunnell, and the rise of the fascist movement in the UK.

== Production ==
Announced in July 2010 with the title Young James, the series was devised by Johnny Byrne, a scriptwriter on All Creatures Great and Small, and consultant producer Kate Croft. Byrne, who died in 2008 during the development of the series, knew Alf Wight (who wrote under the pen name Herriot) and his passion and experience convinced Croft that a series could be successful:

Through his friendship with Alf he also came to know this wonderful story of how Alf became a vet. This was an amazing story and when he first told me – this was about 10 years ago – I knew it had to be a TV series.

— Kate Croft

The series was produced by Koco Drama, a Shed Media company, and written by their executives Ann McManus and Eileen Gallagher. The team had access to the Herriot archive and the archives of the Glasgow Veterinary College, including the diaries and case notes he kept during his student years. It was produced with the cooperation of Wight's family; they met de Caestecker, who found them "very helpful", and he had dinner with Wight's son Jim.

== Episodes ==
No.	Title	Original release date	UK viewers (millions)
1	"Episode 1"	18 December 2011	6.73
James Herriot dreams of nothing more than becoming a vet, so is very pleased when he is accepted by the veterinary college in Glasgow. However, his first day doesn't quite go to plan when he ends up insulting Professor Ritchie, without knowing who he is. Herriot is sent on his first job – to find the cure for a sick horse – but after his first diagnoses finds the animal has more problems that are not curable.
2	"Episode 2"	19 December 2011	5.08
James Herriot is called to deal with a deadly epidemic on a farm but his intervention might pull the family apart. He then does what he can to make it right. Meanwhile McAloon is presented with an opportunity he cannot refuse and Professor Gunnell gets a shock.
3	"Episode 3"	20 December 2011	4.99
James Herriot struggles to balance his politics and his career as a vet after he takes a job at Jenny Muirhead's parents' kennels. Their fascist sympathies soon come to the boil and present a serious problem for both James and Professor Ritchie. Meanwhile Professor Gunnell pushes on to try to get Whirley out of the college and James is left facing a hard choice.

== Reception ==
The first episode gained an audience of 6.73 million, with the second and third episodes attracting 5.08 million and 4.99 million viewers respectively.

Christopher Hooton in Metro found that it failed to leave a lasting impression, saying it was "an insubstantial, mildly-pleasing period soap". He later said that "the last thing we needed was a bloated, plodding period drama", and he found the lighting "more appropriate to a sombre Dickens adaptation than tales of a charming young Scot bumbling his way through veterinary college". Jasper Rees for The Arts Desk also discusses the production design, and said: "Basically, they've made a children's drama and slotted it after the watershed. The writing goes exceptionally easy on nuance and texture." It reminded Michael Hogan, writing in The Daily Telegraph, "of French and Saunders's cruelly accurate costume parody, The House of Idiot, where characters crowbarred in clumsy nods to 'the period' just to remind forgetful viewers". Despite the "odd amusing moment", he felt it "rather let down the well-loved original".

At the 2012 British Academy Scotland Awards, Iain de Caestecker and Michael Keillor were nominated for the television actor and director awards respectively.

In April 2012 the BBC confirmed the series would not return.

== Home release ==
The first series was released in the United Kingdom on 5 March 2012. In the U.S. and Canada on 4 September 2012.
