= Molly Davies =

British playwright

Molly Davies is a British playwright originally from Norfolk but now living in London.

A graduate of the University of Kent at Canterbury, she is currently writing and works part-time as a teacher.

Davies is a product of the Royal Court Theatre's programme for young playwrights, and her debut play A Miracle was staged at the Court from 27 February to 21 March 2009. The play met with instant acclaim from critics. Evelyn Curlet wrote in The Stage, "Davies writes with punch and panache and has made a spare, powerful debut", Charles Spencer wrote in the Telegraph that "this proves a shattering full-length debut" and Dominic Maxwell awarded a 4 star review, saying Davies was "another striking success from the Court's new writers season". A Miracle received strong reviews in several other UK newspapers and Davies was longlisted for the award for Most Promising Playwright in the 2009 Evening Standard Awards.

In 2014 Davies's play God Bless the Child was staged at the Royal Court, directed by Vicky Featherstone and with a cast including Amanda Abbington and Julie Hesmondhalgh. In 2015, Ms. Davies became the first female playwright to win the Pinter Commission.
