= White Gold (TV series) =

2017 British sitcom

- Genre: Sitcom
- Created by: Damon Beesley
- Written by: Damon Beesley; Joe Thomas; Chris Niel
- Directed by: Damon Beesley
- Starring: Ed Westwick; James Buckley; Joe Thomas; Rachel Shenton
- Country of origin: United Kingdom
- No. of series: 2
- No. of episodes: 12

Production
- Producer: Phil Gilbert
- Editor: William Webb
- Production company: Fudge Park Productions

Original release
- Network: BBC Two
- Release: 28 May 2017 – 10 April 2019

White Gold is a British sitcom featuring a group of UPVC window salesmen in mid-1980s Corringham, Essex. It stars Ed Westwick as Vincent, the head of a double-glazed windows sales team, with former Inbetweeners cast members Joe Thomas and James Buckley. BBC Two announced that series two of the show would air on 6 March 2019. Series 1 was released internationally by Netflix on 11 August 2017. Series 2 was released internationally by Netflix on 17 May 2019.

== Summary ==
White Gold is a British sitcom set in Essex during the 1980s. The series follows a group of ambitious double-glazing salesmen working at Cachet Windows, centring on charismatic salesman Vincent Swan and his colleagues Brian Fitzpatrick and Martin Lavender, under the management of their boss, Tony Walsh, as they navigate the competitive world of sales, workplace rivalries and the excesses of the era.

=== Series 1 ===
Series 1 follows the exploits of Vincent Swan, a charismatic and unscrupulous double-glazing salesman at Cachet Windows, alongside his colleagues Brian Fitzpatrick and Martin Lavender. Over the course of six episodes, the series depicts their high-pressure sales tactics, personal conflicts, and moral compromises, as Vincent navigates marital difficulties, financial troubles, and workplace rivalries. The series concludes with Vincent undertaking a bold scheme to restore his standing, illustrating the competitive and morally ambiguous world of 1980s sales culture.

=== Series 2 ===
Series 2 continues the story of Vincent Swan and the Cachet Windows sales team in mid‑1980s Essex. The series focuses on the challenges they face from a rival company and the pressures of maintaining their business. Vincent must manage new complications, including the involvement of his boss Ronnie’s son RJ, while the team engages in various schemes to secure sales. The series concludes with Vincent and his colleagues facing the consequences of their actions, forcing them to confront the limits of their ambition and the ethical compromises they have made in the cutthroat world of 1980s sales.

== Cast and characters ==
- Ed Westwick as Vincent Swan, the head salesman at Cachet Windows
- James Buckley as Brian Fitzpatrick, a junior salesman
- Joe Thomas as Martin Lavender, a junior salesman
- Nigel Lindsay as Tony Walsh, the owner of Cachet Windows
- Linzey Cocker as Sam Swan, Vincent's wife
- Lauren O'Rourke as Carol, the secretary at Cachet Windows
- Lee Ross as Ronnie Farrell, a gangster who pretends to be an antiquities dealer
- Rachel Shenton as Joanne "Jo" Scott, a motivational spokeswoman turned head saleswoman for W-Windows (series 2)
- Theo Barklem-Biggs as Ronnie "RJ" Farrell Jr., the son of Ronnie Farrell (series 2)

== Episodes ==
Series	Episodes	Originally released	
Series	Episodes	First released	Last released
1	6	28 May 2017	28 June 2017
2	6	6 March 2019	10 April 2019

=== Series 1 (2017) ===
No. overall	No. in season	Title	Directed by	Written by	Original release date	UK viewers (millions)
1	1	"Salesmen Are Like Vampires"	Damon Beesley	Damon Beesley	28 May 2017	1.94
Vincent Swan, a successful double-glazing salesman, tries to convince an old colleague to join the double-glazing business. His team at Cachet Windows in Corringham include Brian Fitzpatrick, a smarmy reprobate who can charm the life savings out of anyone, and Martin Lavender, a failed musician whose politeness and moral backbone have a habit of getting in the way of a sale. The two take a bet on whether Fitzpatrick can 'sell ice to the Eskimos'.
2	2	"Sexy Rollercoaster"	Damon Beesley	Joe Thomas	4 June 2017	1.36
When Vincent, Fitzpatrick and Lavender meet a group of men from a local publishing company, alpha male hackles are raised – not only do these men get an expense account, but they each have a company car. When Cachet boss Tony Walsh rejects Vincent's request to match these perks, Vincent starts to think that maybe he is in the wrong business. Meanwhile, in a bid to save face, Fitzpatrick puts faith in his comprehensive knowledge of Cachet's home turf – with potentially dangerous consequences. In the showroom, receptionist Carol tries to get to grips with the new office computer.
3	3	"Close Encounters"	Damon Beesley	Damon Beesley	11 June 2017	N/A
When Vincent receives a visit from a tax inspector pursuing him for unpaid tax, he decides that now would be a good time to get out of the showroom and spend more time with the family. A trip to Southend does not go as planned, but he still wins brownie points from the wife and kids. Fitzpatrick and Lavender clash over the ethics of Page 3 when an opportunity to photograph Brendan the fitter's daughter for a competition in The Sun arises. Meanwhile, Vincent's side-business – pirating copies of E.T. on VHS in the backroom of the showroom – is still rolling out in his absence.
4	4	"The Widow Maker"	Damon Beesley	Damon Beesley	14 June 2017	N/A
When Vincent and Lavender discover that Fitzpatrick is a CB radio enthusiast, they go undercover to dupe him. However, when the prank goes spectacularly wrong, it reveals a side to Fitzpatrick that his Cachet colleagues have never seen before. Meanwhile, Vincent receives some unexpected but exciting news – he has been nominated for entrepreneur of the year in the Essex Business Awards. Vincent immediately splashes out on a table for the company, so that the team can see him take the prize that is surely his. Before that, though, he must face his wife, Sam, who has discovered that her husband is having an affair with their son's primary school teacher.
5	5	"Smell the Weakness"	Damon Beesley	Chris Niel	21 June 2017	0.88
Vincent's life has taken a turn for the worse – kicked out of the family home, in debt to the Inland Revenue by £50,000, and worst of all, he has lost his sales mojo. Splitting his time between a prostitute's flat and the Cachet sofa, Vincent is gently sliding into the abyss – but absolution appears in the most dangerous of forms. Lavender, having his own career crisis, is drawn back into the world of rock and roll, and invites Sam along to a gig. Meanwhile, Fitzpatrick has a new career selling diet pills – at least, that is what the label on the bottle says.
6	6	"The Secret of Sales"	Damon Beesley	Damon Beesley	28 June 2017	N/A
In a bid to regain everything that he has lost – his marriage, his livelihood, his self-worth – Vincent concocts a spectacular plot to return to success. With local gangster Ronnie Farrell on side, he has Walshy's business in his sights. Before that, though, he has to pay off his massive tax bill – getting the cash is one thing, but delivering it to the Inland Revenue turns out to be much more complicated. When Carol makes a simple mistake, Fitzpatrick and Lavender must help save the day. What follows is a break-neck race against time as Vincent desperately scrambles to get back on top.

=== Series 2 (2019) ===
No. overall	No. in season	Title	Directed by	Written by	Original release date	UK viewers (millions)
7	1	"The Past Does Not Equal the Future"	Damon Beesley	Damon Beesley	6 March 2019	N/A
It is 1985: 8 months have passed since Vincent teamed up with Ronnie to get Walshy to sell Cachet Windows to them for a pound. Vincent's mounting problems are added to by a local competitor, Walshy's new company, W-Windows, taking a lot of Cachet's business. Their head of sales, Jo Scott, is attractive and ruthless. Fitzpatrick's wife Maureen has left him for a woman; he is now living in the shed. He and Carol go on a date to a restaurant. Their conversation does not go well, but she decides that they should have sex to test their sexual compatibility. She finds it completely unsatisfying and rejects his suggestion to have sex together again.
8	2	"Take One for the Team"	Damon Beesley	Joe Thomas	13 March 2019	N/A
Vincent is forced by Ronnie to employ his inexperienced, dimwitted, arrogant, obnoxious, selfish son Ronnie Junior. He is a liability – playing Stratego when he should be working and saying inappropriate things to potential customers – further complicating Vincent's efforts to keep the business afloat. Vincent convinces Lavender to seduce his sales rival Jo who works for W-Windows, as a way to gain information on her successful business tactics – but she does not give away any relevant information. The problems continue at Cachet, however, when the team's plot to use local teenage Page 3 model Donna Donnelly as advertising bait fails when RJ has the flyers printed wrongly and Walshy uses their idea to use Donna to promote W-Windows. RJ brings Steve Davis to the showroom, but that brings little interest because Davis is boring.
9	3	"The Essex Illuminati"	Damon Beesley	Chris Niel	20 March 2019	N/A
Vincent, Lavender and Fitzpatrick infiltrate the local Masons and use the opportunity to drum up new business. The trio are expelled for bringing strippers to the lodge. Some customers are angry with the fact that the conservatories which Cachet fitted are leaking badly. One disgruntled customer handcuffs herself to the showroom's front door. Lavender and Jo continue their unlikely relationship, though he insists they go on a restaurant date when he senses Jo is only interested in hearing about Cachet’s new business leads and being sex buddies. Vincent and Sam go on a date at the same restaurant, and Jo invites them to join them in a double date. Jo suspects Sam to be the married woman whom Lavender said he had an affair with. Lavender tells Vincent that he is not going to see Jo any more. Ronnie hires Jo to co-showroom manage alongside Vincent, who is annoyed at having to share the position with her.
10	4	"Small Victories"	Damon Beesley	Damon Beesley	27 March 2019	N/A
Jo now co-manages Cachet Windows and tells Lavender and Fitzpatrick that until they recover windows or their value from an Irish Traveller who stole them using an implausible scam, she will recover their cost by taking it out of their commission. Fitzpatrick quits and is employed by Walshy for £20,000 basic salary, 7% commission and a company car. Fitzpatrick hires RJ, without authorisation for Walshy. RJ phones W Windows from a phonebox next to a caravan site, saying that he has made a £50,000 deal. Sam attends a trade conference and is subject to frequent sexist jokes from one of the company’s top clients, which she replies to by joking about his 15-year-old daughter. Sam's boss Andrew tries to persuade her to leave Vincent for him. She refuses, so he tells her that he has to reduce his staff and that he can no longer employ her. Jo tells Vincent about Lavender's affair with Sam. Jo and Vincent have sex, then she threatens to tell Sam about it if she does not let her be the boss. Unable to find a solution after Jo gains the upper hand, Vincent goes to Ronnie who has a job for him – take £250,000 of his undeclared cash to Malta. Vincent suggests to Sam that they go on holiday to Malta together.
11	5	"Capturing the Flag"	Damon Beesley	Damon Beesley	3 April 2019	N/A
Vincent takes Sam, their daughter Nat and their son Robbie to Malta for a few days, unaware that he is carrying £250,000 cash. Vincent hands the cash to Ronnie's associate Roland, who takes Vincent and Sam onto his yacht, where Roland and his business partner Alan offer Vincent a job selling timeshares in Marbella. Vincent is keen to take the job, and Sam wants to move with him, but Vincent is concerned that Ronnie will not let him. Lavender tells Jo that he is taking a few days off, which she objects to. Jo gives Carol a trial as a saleswoman; Carol is successful at selling to people in their homes. However, she cannot sleep due to guilt over lying to customers, so she returns to her position as secretary. Lavender flies from Southend Airport to Malta and surprises Sam, which she is annoyed about; his feet are later severely sunburnt. Jo phones Vincent to tells him that he has to decide whether to accept her as his boss or she will tell Sam that they had sex recently. Vincent and Jo have phone sex. Vincent sees Sam talking to Lavender and confronts them. In front of Vincent, Lavender asks Sam to leave Vincent for him. Sam finds out from Vincent that he was informed by Jo of Sam's affair with Lavender. Sam rejects Lavender and he goes home. At work, RJ is concerned that Ronnie appears to have gone missing. Vincent receives a call from Roland to tell him that Ronnie has been dealt with.
12	6	"Winning Isn't Everything"	Damon Beesley	Damon Beesley	10 April 2019	N/A
Fitzpatrick walks in on Maureen and RJ having sex in her bed. Both men hate the dog, Nigel, so RJ drugs Nigel using Valium and the pair abandon Nigel in the woods. Carol tells Fitzpatrick that they should have sex again. Lavender is taken to Basildon Hospital after suffering scalding caused by a potential customer's dog knocking a hot drink onto his sunburnt feet. Sam visits him there and kisses him. They tell each other that they want to become a couple. He later receives a letter from her, rejecting him. The staff at Cachet think it likely that Ronnie is dead. Sam does not want to move to Spain because Robbie has failed his eleven-plus. Vincent asks Jo to move to Spain with him instead; she agrees and they resign together. Walshy buys Cachet from Ronnie's wife Lizzie and RJ. Ronnie walks into Cachet; he had been given a week-long party in Marbella in order to allow Vincent to leave Cachet and take the timeshare job. Sam deliberately drives her Volkswagen Golf through the conservatory of Patricia, a neighbour whom she hates and who hates her. Vincent brings Natalie and Robbie to pick up Sam in his Mercedes and drives them to Southend Airport. He tells Jo that he is leaving with Sam and the kids, which infuriates her.

== Production ==
The show is produced by BBC Comedy alongside Fudge Park Productions, which was established in 2015 by the creators of The Inbetweeners – Damon Beesley and Iain Morris. Beesley created White Gold and acts as show runner and executive producer, in addition to having written eight of the 12 episodes. Joe Thomas and Chris Niel wrote two episodes each.

White Gold was renewed for series 2 but production was suspended in November 2017 following allegations of sexual assault against Ed Westwick. Filming recommenced in November 2018, after Westwick was not charged with a crime. Series 2 aired in 2019.

James Buckley responded to a fan on Twitter stating that he was unaware of any cancellation of the show after a Facebook post from the BBC started circulating online. It was later confirmed by the BBC that the post was fake. At this time, it has not been officially confirmed whether White Gold will return for another series.

== Reception ==
White Gold received generally positive reviews from critics. On Rotten Tomatoes, the first series holds an 88% approval rating, with reviewers praising its 1980s setting, dark humour, and performances, while noting that the tone and characters could be polarising. The second series has a 90% approval rating, based on a smaller number of reviews, with critics highlighting the continuation of the series' style and charm, though some felt the humour and plot were less consistent than in the first series.

Media commentary often noted the series' embrace of 1980s culture and humour. A Chortle review remarked on the show's "laddish swagger" and exposed the era's Thatcherite backdrop, with characters' superficiality presented as part of the comedic world. Another review described the comedy as grounded in exaggerated, foul‑mouthed dialogue and highlighted its use of period details such as music and fashion to evoke nostalgia.

The show's style and character dynamics were sometimes noted as contentious. While some found the anti‑heroic traits of Vincent and his colleagues entertaining, others observed that their exaggerated behaviour could be irritating or off‑putting to some viewers. In interviews discussing the series, cast and creators emphasised that the characters' language and behaviour were intended to reflect the setting and to be humorous rather than purely provocative.
