= Voter Intention Collection System =

Application to collect voting intentions

Voter Intention Collection System (VICS)
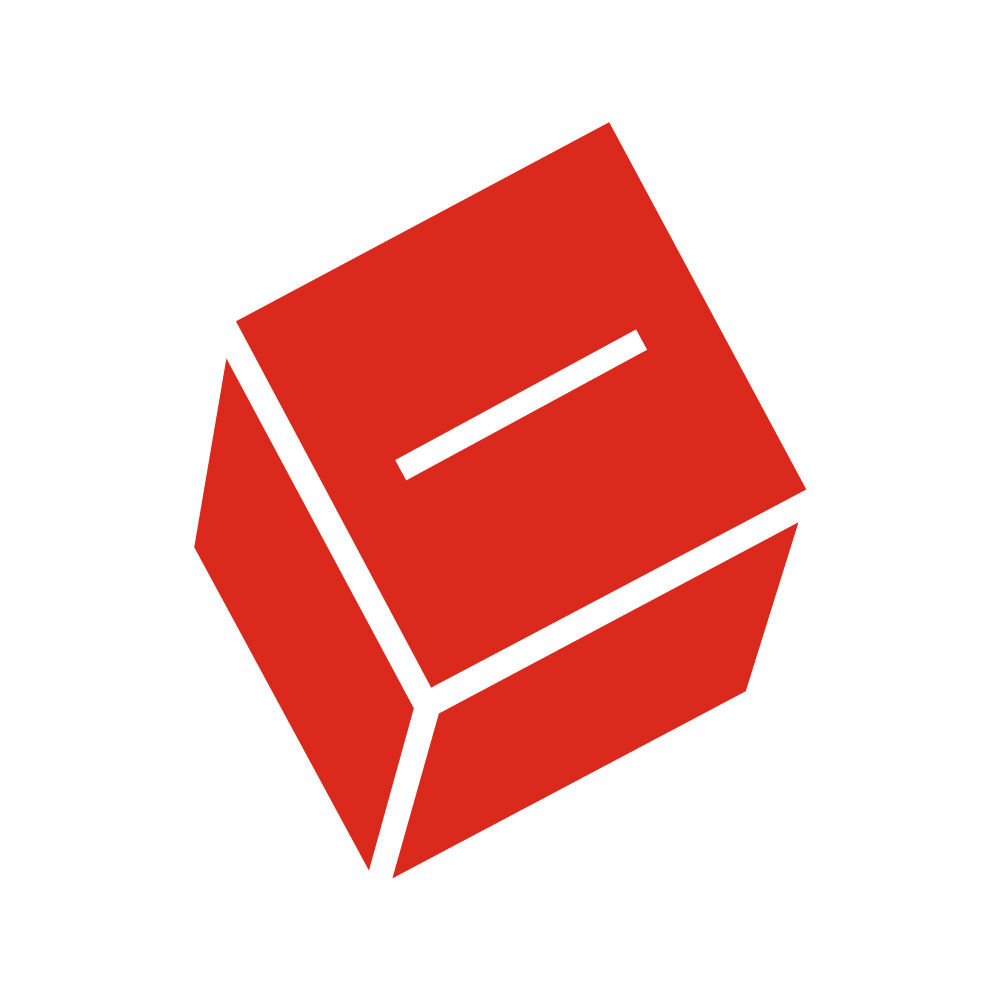
- Original author(s): Stein Fletcher
- Repository: github.com/celestial-winter/vics
- Written in: Java; AngularJS
- License: MIT License

Voter Intention Collection System also known by its acronym VICS is a bespoke canvassing software system with a voter database originally created for the Vote Leave campaign for the 2016 United Kingdom European Union membership referendum. Vote leave director Dominic Cummings have claimed it was crucial to the success of that campaign while others have claimed other systems were also crucial. An open-source version is available.

== Etymology ==
The acronym VICS as well as standing for Voter Intention Collection System was also the nickname of Victoria Woodcock, operations director of Vote Leave who project managed the creation of the system.

== History ==
BBC political editor Laura Kuenssberg has commented an insider in the Vote Leave Campaign had told her they were looking at ways to "find a way of mashing the mountain of data that we generate in daily life online with more normal ways of measuring political support". Tom Waterhouse, deputy head of the ground campaign for vote leave, said Stein Fletcher built the VICS system.

The location of a GitHub open source repository under an MIT license that could build the VICS system was made known by Cummings in a blog post in October 2016.

== Technical ==
=== Operation ===
Waterhouse described the way VICS worked for the ground campaign can be summarised as follows: VICS would be loaded with a "model", a predictive algorithm used to predict the percentage of Eurosceptic voters at the level of individual streets when combined with statistics from the 2014 general and European elections. With minimal cross checking the prediction from doorstep canvassing activists were able to target specific addresses where there was likely to be a leave voter on polling day.

=== Components ===
The user interface for the client was developed as a Single-page application using AngularJS. The application tier was developed with Java using a Spring framework To achieve the installation from the source on a server several components must be pre-installed including PostgreSQL, redis and Apache Maven. Data is transferred between the user interface and application tier using REST over the HTTP protocol serialized as JSON.

== Significance debate ==
There are claims the intelligence VICS enabled the Vote Leave campaign to cost-effectively deliver over one billion targeted advertisements over social media with most via Facebook. Others claims VICS was not as capable or effective as it was claimed to be, with some of Cummings' claimed functionality already available on Facebook. Information technology from Aggregate IQ is also claimed to have provided important and controversial support to the Vote Leave Campaign.
