= All Out War (book) =

2016 book by Tim Shipman

- First edition
- Author: Tim Shipman
- Language: English
- Genre: Political History
- Publisher: William Collins
- Publication date: 2016

All Out War: The Full Story of How Brexit Sank Britain's Political Class is a 2016 political history book by the Sunday Times political editor Tim Shipman, focusing on the 2016 Brexit referendum.

== Reception ==
In the London Review of Books, Ian Jack declared that it was, as of 2017, "the fullest and most reliable account of the [Brexit referendum] campaign". In The Guardian, Will Hutton called it "excellent", observing that "there seems to be no one to whom [Shipman] hasn't spoken and whose motives he does not pretty accurately portray and understand." Stephen Bush of New Statesman praised Shipman's "lucid prose". The Economist found it to be "thorough, comprehensive and utterly gripping", and noted the "remarkably short time" in which Shipman wrote it.
