= 2012 British Academy Scotland Awards =

- Date: 18 November 2012
- Site: Radisson Blu Hotel, Glasgow, Scotland
- Hosted by: Edith Bowman

Television coverage
- Network: Streaming webcast
- Duration: 1 hour, 56 minutes

The 2012 British Academy Scotland Awards, were given by the British Academy of Film and Television Arts (BAFTA), Scotland (also known as BAFTA Scotland, or BAFTA in Scotland), and honoured the best Scottish film, television and animated productions, and video games released between the period of 31 August 2011 – 31 July 2012. Presented on 18 November 2012, the event was presided over by Scottish media personality Edith Bowman at the Radisson Blu Hotel, in Glasgow, Scotland.

The Angels' Share received the most nominations with four, winning two for Best Actor/Actress in a Film and Best Writer, and Up There was nominated for two awards, winning both for Best Feature Film and Best Director. Television series Rab C. Nesbitt and Young James Herriot were given two nominations each, the former of which won an award for Best Actor/Actress in Television. Actor Billy Connolly received the Outstanding Contribution to Television and Film Award, a lifetime achievement award and the highest accolade BAFTA in Scotland can bestow.

== Winners and nominees ==
Winners are listed first and highlighted in boldface; the nominees are listed below alphabetically and not in boldface.

Best Feature Film	Best Comedy Entertainment Programme
**Up There**; The Angels' Share; Citadel	**Mrs. Brown's Boys** (BBC Scotland); Kevin Bridges: What's the Story? (BBC One); Sweet Dreams - Sgeulachd Patsy Cline (BBC Alba)
Best Actor/Actress – Film	Best Actor/Actress – Television
**Paul Brannigan** – **The Angels' Share** as **Robbie**; James Cosmo – Citadel as Priest; Siobhan Reilly – The Angels' Share as Leonie	**Gregor Fisher** – **Rab C. Nesbitt** as **Robert "Rab" C. Nesbitt**; Iain De Caestecker – Young James Herriot as James Herriot; Elaine C. Smith – Rab C. Nesbitt as Mary "Mary Doll" Nesbitt
Best Director	Best Writer
**Zam Salim – Up There**; Mark Cousins – What Is This Film Called Love?; Michael Keillor – Young James Herriot	**The Angels' Share** – **Paul Laverty**; Kevin Bridges: What's the Story? – Kevin Bridges (BBC One); Lip Service – Louise Ironside (Episode 5) (BBC Three)
Best Current Affairs Programme	Best Factual Series
**Rangers - The Men Who Sold the Jerseys** (BBC One); Eòrpa (BBC Alba); Travellers (BBC Two Scotland)	**Afghanistan: The Great Game - A Personal View by Rory Stewart** (BBC Two); The Last Explorers, Livingstone (BBC One); The Story of Film: An Odyssey (More4)
Best Features/ Factual Entertainment Programme	Best Single Documentary
**Antiques Road Trip** (BBC Two); Bank of Dave (Channel 4); Robson's Extreme Fishing Challenge (Channel 5)	**After Life: The Strange Science of Decay** (BBC Four); A Life Through The Lens: David Peat (BBC Two); RBS: Inside The Bank That Ran Out of Money
Best Game	Best Animation
**Bad Hotel**; Golf Squared; Ibomber Defence Pacific	**The Making of Longbird**; All That Glisters; I Am Tom Moody

== Special awards ==
Billy Connolly received the Outstanding Contribution to Television and Film Award, a lifetime achievement award, "In recognition of [his] enormous achievements as one of Scotland’s most successful talents." The awards for Special Achievement in 2012 went to Christopher Young, who produced The Inbetweeners Movie (2011), Callum Macrae, for directing the television documentary, Sri Lanka's Killing Fields, and Paul Mcguigan, director of the television series, Sherlock. Stuart Cosgrove was given the Outstanding Contribution To Broadcasting award, and costume designer Trisha Biggar collected the award for Outstanding Contribution For Craft.

== See also ==
- 65th British Academy Film Awards
- 2012 British Academy Television Awards
- 2012 British Academy Television Craft Awards
- 2012 British Academy Cymru Awards
