= Tim Shipman =

British journalist (born 1975)

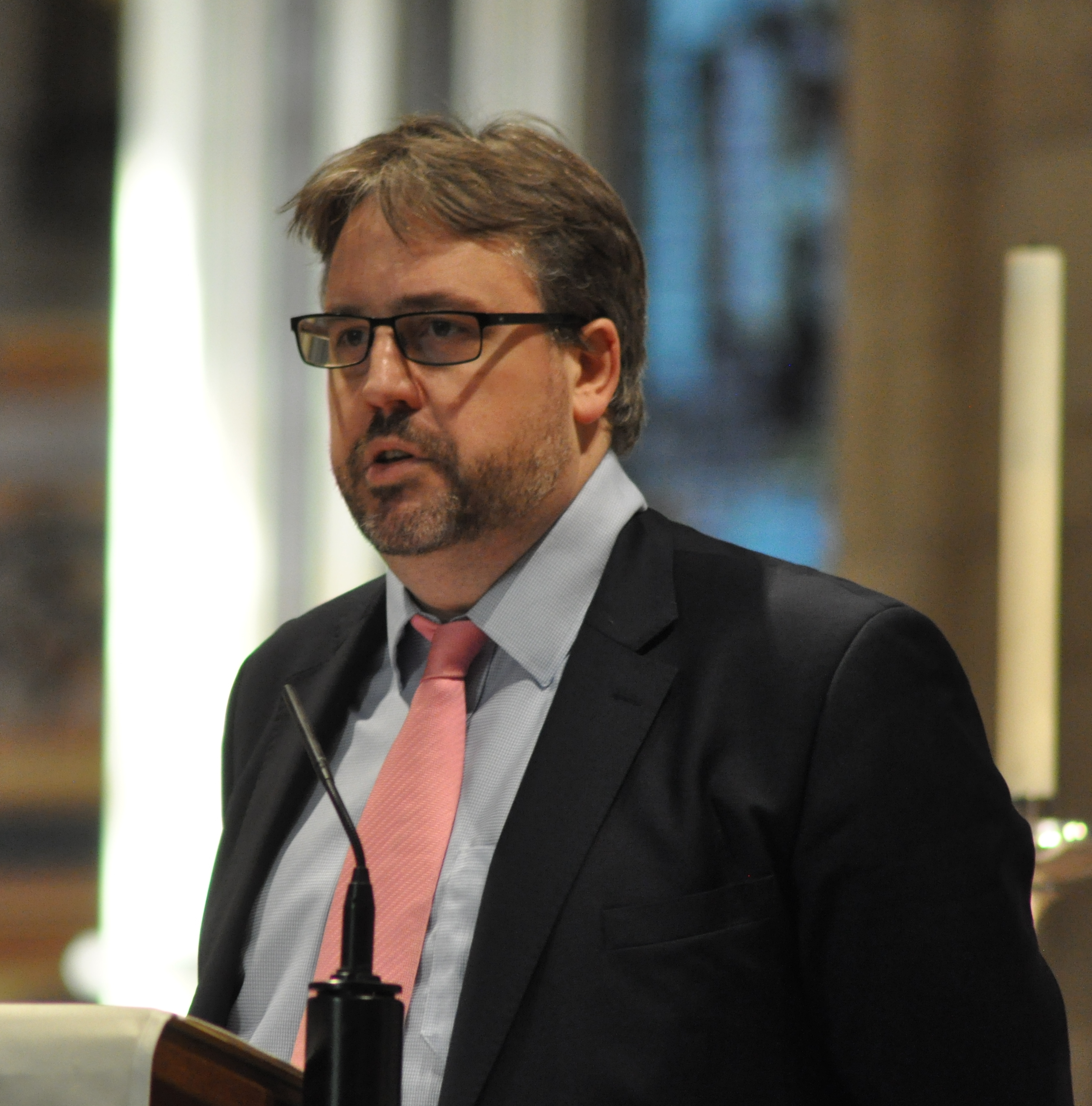
- Born: Timothy James Shipman; 13 May 1975 (age 51); Basingstoke, Hampshire, England
- Education: University of Cambridge
- Occupation: Journalist
- Known for: Former political editor of The Sunday Times

Timothy James Shipman (born 13 May 1975) is a British journalist, who is currently political editor at The Spectator and formerly chief political commentator at The Sunday Times.

== Early life and education ==
Shipman attended Queen Elizabeth's Grammar School, Horncastle, in Lincolnshire. He read history at Churchill College, Cambridge, graduating in 1996, and was part of a losing Cuppers darts team, beaten by a Robinson team in the finals.

== Career ==
He has been a national newspaper journalist since 1997, working initially for the Express stable of newspapers before being appointed as a political correspondent for the Daily Mail in 2005. He worked for The Sunday Telegraph as a Washington DC political correspondent, covering the 2008 United States elections and Barack Obama's campaign and subsequent victory. He later became deputy political editor of the Daily Mail. He has also previously written for the Sunday Express. He was chairman of the Parliamentary Press Gallery in 2012.

In January 2014, Shipman was appointed the political editor of The Sunday Times.

He is the author of All Out War (2016) about the EU referendum in 2016 and Fall Out (2017) about the 2017 UK general election. In 2017 he was awarded Press Journalist of the Year by the London Press Club.

In March 2019, Shipman reported an alleged coup in the Conservative Party to remove the prime minister, Theresa May, from office.

In October 2021, he became chief political commentator of The Sunday Times, with his deputy Caroline Wheeler taking over as political editor.

In February 2022, Shipman lost a libel case brought by Baroness Chapman, paying her substantial damages and legal costs. In May 2021, Shipman had posted two tweets on Twitter, one attributed to an unnamed Labour party source, that the court determined meant he had falsely suggested Chapman had a "secret adulterous relationship" with Labour leader Keir Starmer. Shipman deleted one of the tweets soon after, but it had already been extensively republished.

== Bibliography ==
- Shipman, Tim (2016). All Out War: The Full Story of How Brexit Sank Britain's Political Class. William Collins. ISBN 9780008215156.
- Shipman, Tim (2017). Fall Out: A Year of Political Mayhem. William Collins. ISBN 9780008215156.
- Shipman, Tim (25 April 2024). No Way Out: Brexit: from the Backstop to Boris. William Collins. ISBN 978-0-00-830894-0.
- Shipman, Tim (20 June 2024). Out: How Brexit Got Done and Four Prime Ministers were Undone. William Collins. ISBN 978-0-00-870996-9.

Media offices
Preceded by Isabel Oakeshott	Political editor of The Sunday Times; 2014–2021	Succeeded by Caroline Wheeler
