= Victoria Woodcock =

Operations manager for the United Kingdom Vote Leave campaign

- Born: 1987 (age 37–38)
- Education: BSc Sociology and Social Policy; MSc in Social Statistics
- Alma mater: University of Southampton
- Known for: Voter Intention Collection System
- Title: Operations manager
- Movement: Vote Leave

Victoria Woodcock was the operations director for the Vote Leave campaign for the 2016 referendum vote for the United Kingdom to leave the European Union.

== Early life ==
Woodcock was born in 1987. She studied at the University of Southampton graduating with a BSc degree in sociology and social policy (2008) and an MSc in social statistics (2010)).

== Government ==
Woodcock's early career was as a civil servant in the Department of Education. From 2014 she worked for a while as adviser to the Government Chief Whip. From 2015 she advised the head of strategic events, delivering and coordinating the 2015 VE Day 70th anniversary celebrations.

== Vote Leave ==
Woodcock was the company secretary and operations director for the Vote Leave campaign. Woodcock was responsible for managing the Voter Intention Collection System (VICS), a bespoke canvassing software system used to model and target the campaign.

== Subsequent career ==
Woodcock moved on to become programme director at the software company Sage.
