= Pyramids of Mars =

082 – Pyramids of Mars
- Doctor Who serial

Cast
- Doctor: Tom Baker – Fourth Doctor
- Companion: Elisabeth Sladen – Sarah Jane Smith
- Others: Gabriel Woolf – Sutekh (Note: Also provided the voice of Horus, uncredited); Bernard Archard – Marcus Scarman; Michael Sheard – Laurence Scarman; Peter Copley – Dr. Warlock; Michael Bilton – Collins; George Tovey – Ernie Clements; Peter Mayock – Namin; Vic Tablian – Ahmed; Nick Burnell, Melvyn Bedford, Kevin Selway – Mummies

Production
- Directed by: Paddy Russell
- Written by: "Stephen Harris" (Robert Holmes and Lewis Greifer)
- Script editor: Robert Holmes
- Produced by: Philip Hinchcliffe
- Executive producer: None
- Music by: Dudley Simpson
- Production code: 4G
- Series: Season 13
- Running time: 4 episodes, 25 minutes each
- First broadcast: 25 October 1975
- Last broadcast: 15 November 1975

Chronology
← Preceded by Planet of Evil	Followed by → The Android Invasion

Pyramids of Mars is the third serial of the 13th season of the British science fiction television series Doctor Who. Written by Robert Holmes and Lewis Greifer under the pseudonym of "Stephen Harris" and directed by Paddy Russell, the serial was first broadcast in four weekly parts on BBC1 from 25 October to 15 November 1975.

The serial is set in the year 1911 in England, Egypt, and Mars. In the serial, the burial chamber of the alien Sutekh, the inspiration for the Egyptian god Set, is unearthed by the archaeology professor Marcus Scarman. Alive but immobilised, Sutekh seeks his freedom by using Professor Scarman as his servant to destroy the jewel in a pyramid on Mars which is keeping him prisoner.

Influenced by the gothic horror genre and films such as The Mummy, the serial was met with widespread critical acclaim, being praised for its atmosphere and production. It marks the first appearance of Sutekh (voiced by Gabriel Woolf), who returned to the series 49 years later in the two-part story "The Legend of Ruby Sunday" / "Empire of Death" (2024), with Woolf reprising his role. The serial would also be briefly referenced in the 2010 "The Sarah Jane Adventures" Series 4 serial "The Vault of Secrets", when Sarah Jane, with the aid of Mr. Smith, disables the cameras on the Mars Rover so that NASA would not learn of the existence of Sutekh's pyramid on the surface of Mars.

== Plot ==
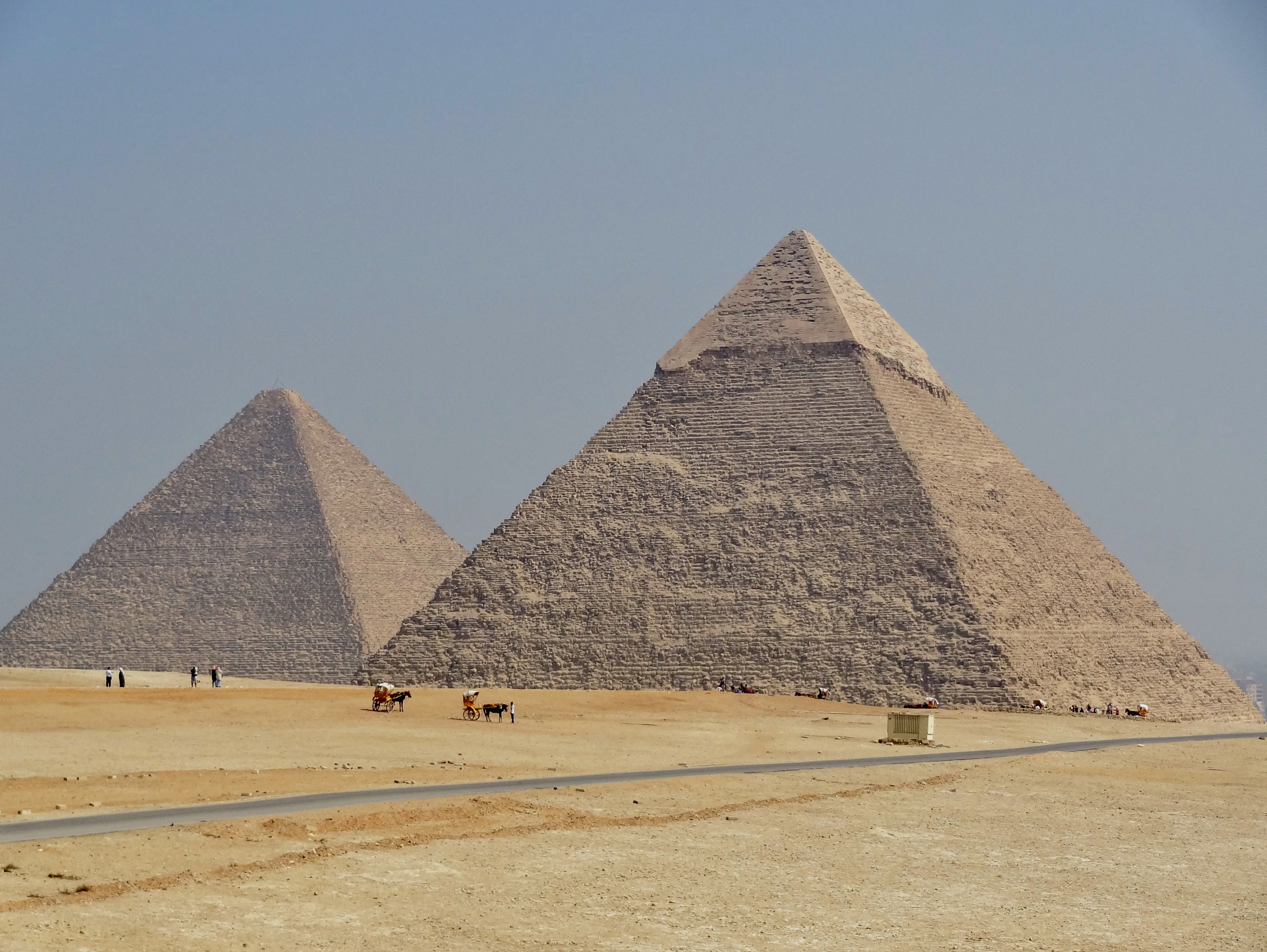
Pyramids of Mars depicts Ancient Egyptian pyramids as extraterrestrial in origin.

In 1911 Egypt, archaeology professor Marcus Scarman excavates a pyramid and finds the door to the burial chamber is inscribed with the Eye of Horus. He enters the chamber and is hit by a beam of green light.

The Fourth Doctor is pulled off his flight path, and Sarah Jane Smith sees an apparition in the console room. The two are found by a butler, who reveals they are in the Scarman estate, which has been taken over by the mysterious Ibrahim Namin, claiming to represent Scarman. Scarman's friend, Dr Warlock, has also arrived at the estate to demand an explanation on Scarman's whereabouts. Namin threatens Warlock with a revolver, with the Doctor and Sarah barely managing to save him. The three escape and reach the estate lodge inhabited by Scarman's brother Laurence, whose marconiscope intercepted a signal from Mars.

The Doctor decodes the signal as "Beware Sutekh", explaining that Sutekh is the last of a powerful alien race called the Osirans. Imprisoned by his brother Horus, using the Eye of Horus, they were the inspiration for ancient Egyptian mythology. Sutekh's servant arrives via a spacetime tunnel portal, accompanied by robots disguised as mummies. He kills Namin and is revealed to be Scarman, now a corpse animated by Sutekh's will. Scarman secures the estate's perimeter with a forcefield, and begins to hunt down the humans. Scarman finds and kills Warlock, but is then ordered by Sutekh to prioritise the construction of an Osirian war missile aimed at Mars.

Following another attack by the robots, the Doctor decides to blow up the rocket, and Laurence suggests using gelignite, kept in the poacher's hut. The Doctor and Sarah Jane leave to obtain the gelignite. Scarman soon arrives at the lodge, and Laurence attempts to rekindle his brother's humanity, but gets strangled instead. The Doctor sets up the explosives, with Sarah Jane detonating it with a rifle. Sutekh telekinetically suppresses the explosion. Left with but one option, the Doctor uses the space-time tunnel to reach Sutekh and break his concentration, allowing the explosion to destroy the rocket. A furious Sutekh turns the Doctor into a thrall to transport Scarman to Mars.

Arriving on Mars, Scarman strangles the Doctor. However, the Doctor's respiratory bypass system allows him to recover and become free of Sutekh's control. He is however unable to stop Scarman from destroying the Eye, and Scarman disintegrates. The Doctor realises that Sutekh will not be released instantaneously due to the travel time required for the Eye's radio signal. Returning to the estate, he uses the TARDIS to extend the time tunnel into the far future, eventually resulting in Sutekh dying of old age before he reaches the end. This overloads the portal, the estate is consumed in flames, and the Doctor and Sarah flee in the TARDIS.

== Production ==
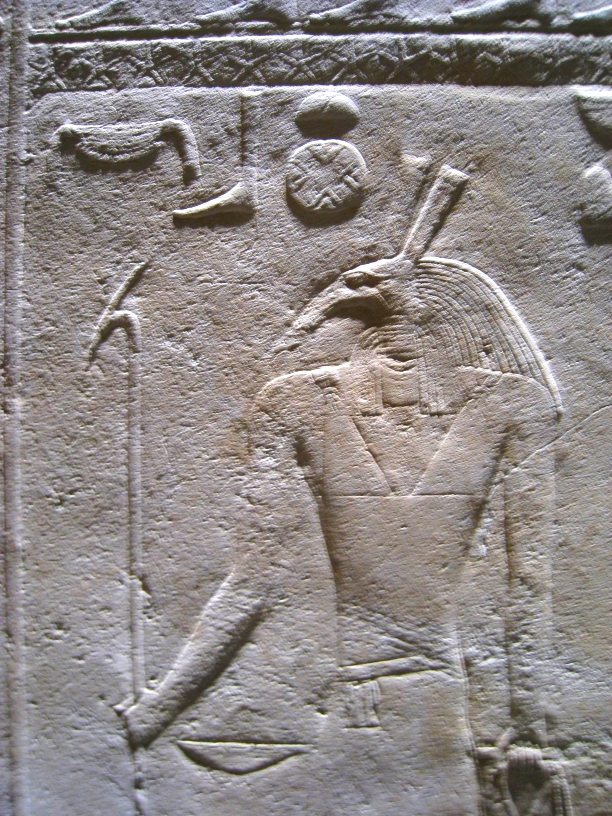
The main villain of the serial, Sutekh, is inspired by the Egyptian deity Set and is said to be Set's inspiration in the serial.

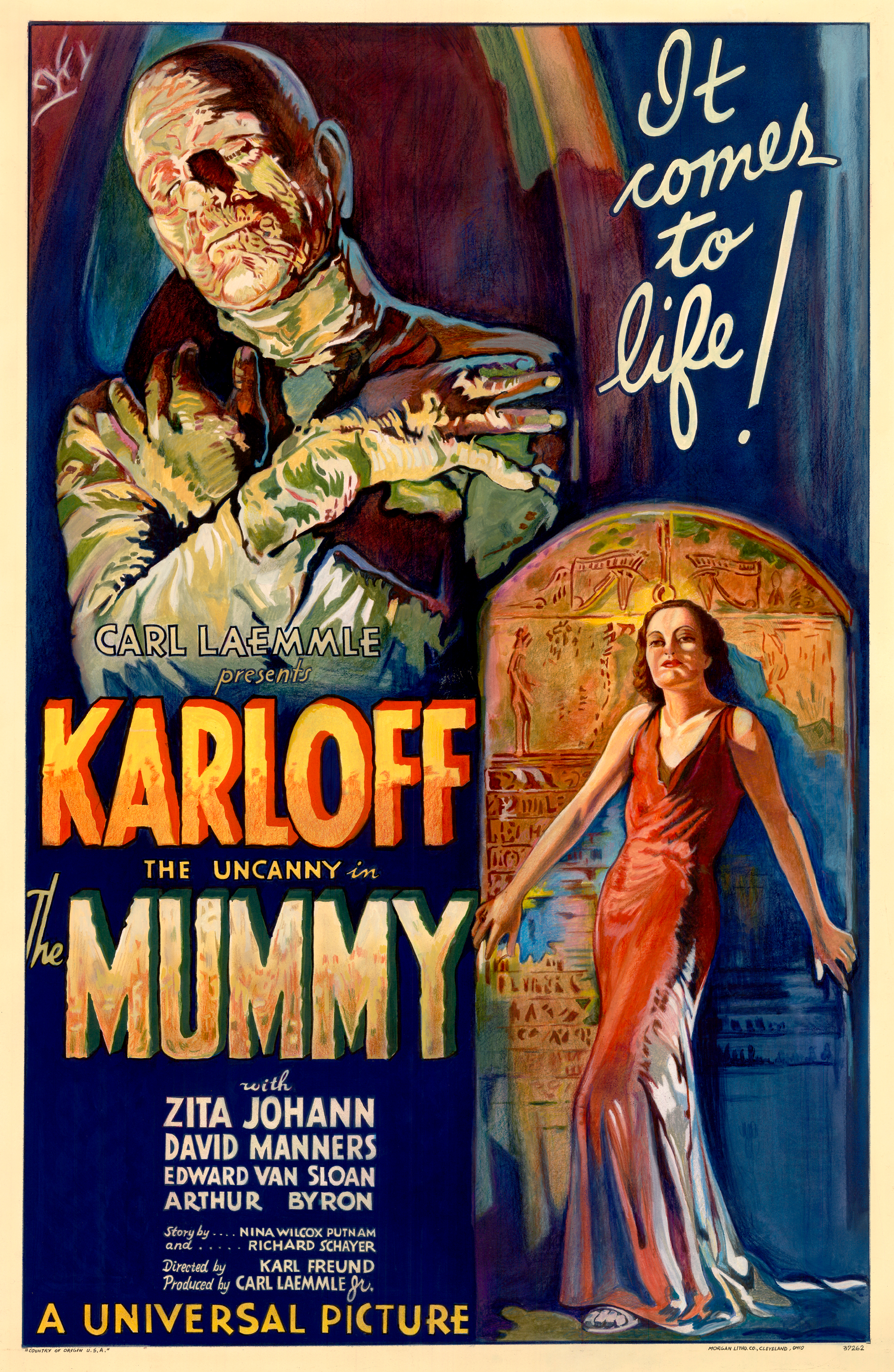
The serial drew influence from earlier mummy films such as The Mummy (1932)

=== Writing ===
The Universal Pictures film The Mummy (1932) and especially the Hammer horror films The Mummy (1959) and Blood from the Mummy's Tomb (1971) influenced the story. It was originally written by Lewis Greifer, who had been approached by script editor Robert Holmes, his former colleague at ATV. However, it was considered unusable as a Doctor Who script, even after multiple rewrites, due to Greifer's unfamiliarity with Doctor Who; Holmes took over, with Greifer retaining the option to have his name on the script. While he retained the basic premise, he completely altered other aspects, which included making the "Osirians" a powerful alien race, and changing the setting to 1911, instead of a more contemporary time. The pseudonym used on transmission was Stephen Harris.

Although the name of Sutekh's race is pronounced "Osiran" throughout the serial, the scripts and publicity material spell it as "Osirian" in some places and as "Osiran" in others.

=== Casting ===
Bernard Archard, who had previously appeared in The Power of the Daleks (1966), was cast as Marcus Scarman, due to his work on the 1970 horror film The Horror of Frankenstein. Michael Sheard, who had also previously featured in two Doctor Who serials, was cast as Laurence Scarman; production assistant Peter Grimwade had recommended him for the role because of his recent performance in the BBC2 show Lord Peter Wimsey.

Gabriel Woolf, a prominent BBC actor, was cast in the role of the villain Sutekh. Woolf would go on to reprise his role in audio dramas by Magic Bullet Productions and Big Finish Productions in 2015; and on television in the two-part series 14 finale "The Legend of Ruby Sunday" / "Empire of Death" in 2024, in which Sutekh appeared as the main villain. He also provided the voice of Sutekh for the comedy sketch Oh Mummy: Sutekh's Story, included on the 2004 DVD release of Pyramids of Mars. Woolf would also go on to provide the voice of "The Beast" in the 2006 episodes "The Impossible Planet" and "The Satan Pit".

=== Filming and post-production ===
The exterior scenes were shot on the Stargroves estate in Hampshire, a Victorian mansion noted for its ornate, Gothic Revival style of architecture which was owned by Mick Jagger at the time. The interior shots, as well as model filming, took place in the BBC Television Centre. Exterior scenes were filmed between 29 May and 2 June, and the interior shots between 7 May and 3 June. Tom Baker and Elisabeth Sladen improvised and added a number of moments in this story, most notably a scene in Part Four where the Doctor and Sarah Jane start to walk out of their hiding place and then when they see a mummy, quickly dart back into it. Baker based the scene on a Marx Brothers routine. Sarah Jane wears a dress which the Doctor says belonged to former companion Victoria Waterfield.

A number of scenes used the colour-separation overlay (CSO) system, including the sarcophagus, which was made to look like it was pulsating with energy; to show the ravaged Earth and the Egyptians settings; and for Sutekh's monitoring systems. It was also used to insert eerie glowing as well as bizarre, swirling patterns to the background. The flame effect at the end of the serial was achieved by using CSO effects, as well as a controlled fire, which was the largest staged fire in the studio at the time.

Several scenes were deleted from the final broadcast. A model shot of the TARDIS landing in the landscape of a barren, alternative 1980 Earth was to be used in Part Two, but director Paddy Russell decided viewers would feel more impact if the first scene of the new Earth was Sarah's reaction as the TARDIS doors opened. Three scenes of effects such as doors opening and the Doctor materializing from the sarcophagus were also removed from the final edit of Part Four because Russell felt the mixes were not good enough.

== Broadcast and reception ==
Episode	Title	Run time	Original release date	UK viewers (millions)
1	"Part One"	25:22	25 October 1975	10.5
2	"Part Two"	23:53	1 November 1975	11.3
3	"Part Three"	24:32	8 November 1975	9.4
4	"Part Four"	24:52	15 November 1975	11.7

The story was edited and condensed into a single, one-hour omnibus episode, broadcast on BBC1 at 5:50 pm on 27 November 1976, reaching 13.7 million viewers, the highest audience achieved by Doctor Who in its entire history at that time.

=== Critical reception ===
In 1985, Colin Greenland reviewed Pyramids of Mars for Imagine magazine, and stated that it was "Dr Who at its eclectic best [...] A yeasty brew of Hammer horror, Egyptian mythology, and sf with a touch of H. G. Wells." Paul Cornell, Martin Day, and Keith Topping gave the serial a positive review in The Discontinuity Guide (1995), praising the "chilling" adversary and some of the conversations. In The Television Companion (1998), David J. Howe and Stephen James Walker described the first episode as "an excellent scene-setter" and the story as "near-flawless". They wrote that Pyramids of Mars gave the "fullest expression" of the Gothic horror era and had high production values and a good guest cast.

In 2010, Patrick Mulkern of Radio Times called it "a bona fide classic" with "arguably the most polished production to date", and praised the powerful plot. However, he disliked how UNIT was dismissed in the season, and found "minor, amusing quibbles" with the plot. Charlie Jane Anders of Gizmodo described Pyramids of Mars as "just a lovely, solid adventure story", highlighting the way the Doctor seemed outmatched, the pace, and Sarah Jane. In a 2010 article, Anders also listed the cliffhanger to the third episode — in which the Doctor is forced to confront Sutekh — as one of the greatest Doctor Who cliffhangers ever. In a 2014 Doctor Who Magazine poll to determine the best Doctor Who stories of all time, readers voted Pyramids of Mars to eighth place. In 2018, The Daily Telegraph ranked Pyramids of Mars at number 18 in "the 56 greatest stories and episodes", stating that "although the mummies are excellent, it is the organic characters who take centre stage, with Baker cementing the increasing alienness of his portrayal of the hero". They concluded that it was "pure gold".

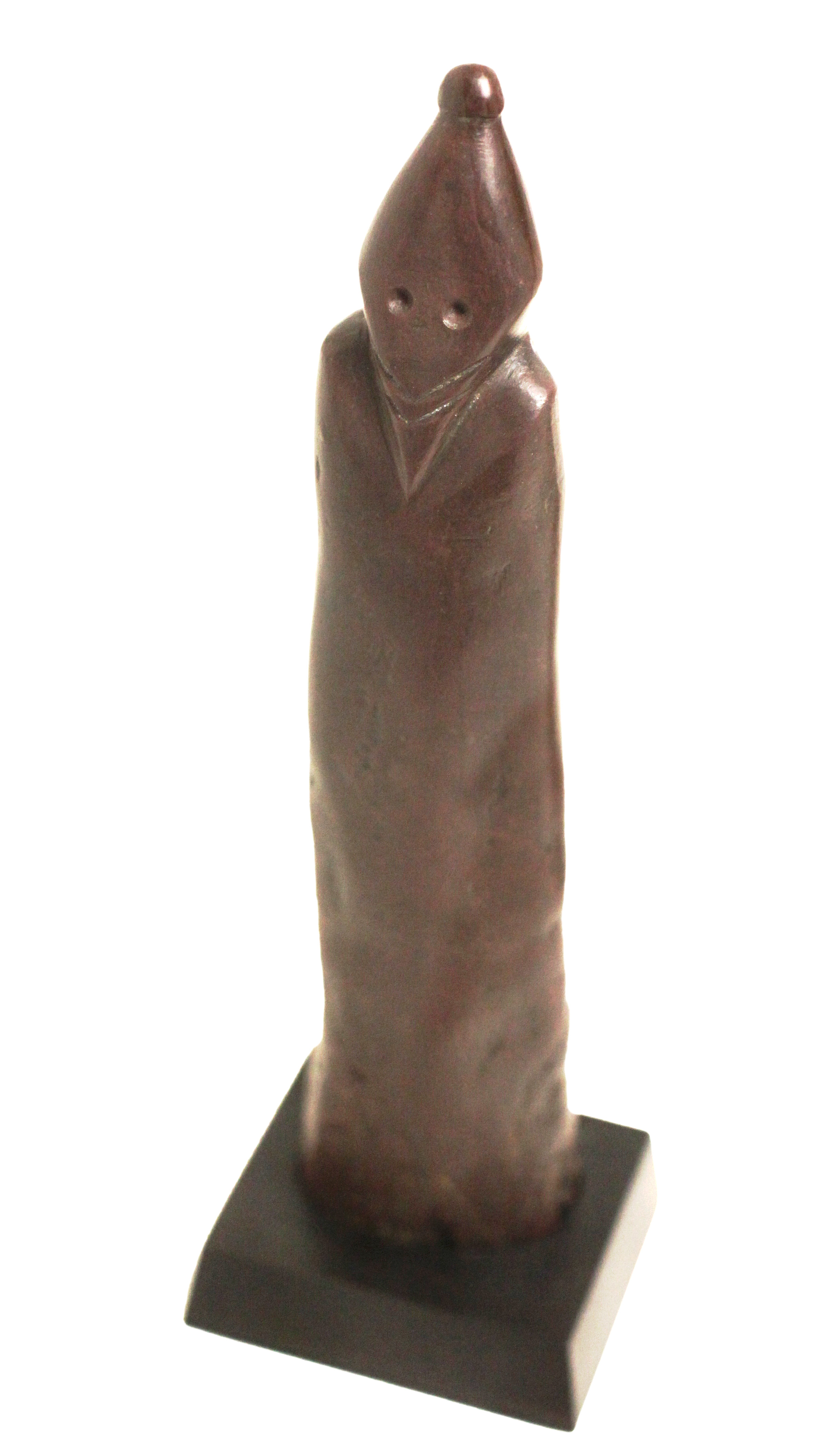
The statue described by John J Johnston, vice-chair of the Egypt Exploration Society, as being an inspiration for Sutekh's design.

In A Critical History of Doctor Who on Television, John Kenneth Muir queried the Egyptian mythology conceit that is woven through the whole story; he also questioned a number of apparently illogical story elements, such as why the robots that guard the priory were disguised as Egyptian mummies, and why the Osiran rocket was shaped as a pyramid. In his assessment, the use of ancient Egyptian objects and symbols by the Osiran race was inadequately explained in the script, and he contrasted Pyramids of Mars unfavourably with Stargate, a 1994 television series which relied heavily on the concept of ancient astronauts visiting Earth. Muir traced parallels with earlier Doctor Who serials such as The Dæmons (1971) and Terror of the Zygons (1975) which had also drawn on the idea of ancient Earth mythologies having extraterrestrial origins. Like The Dæmons and The Tomb of the Cybermen (1967), Pyramids of Mars exploited many familiar conventions of classic mummy films, but less successfully in Muir's view.

John J Johnston, vice-chair of the Egypt Exploration Society, explored the influences on Pyramids of Mars in the Encyclopedia of Mummies in History, Religion, and Popular Culture. He observed that the story drew heavily on a number of classic horror films such as Universal's The Mummy (1932) and Hammer's The Mummy (1959), in both its setting and the performance of the actors. Johnston also noted the influences of archaeology on the production design. According to Johnston, the robot mummies designed by the BBC's Barbara Kidd were inspired by an ancient rock painting of a mysterious domed-headed figure that had been discovered by Henri Lhote in the Sahara Desert in the 1950s, and which Lhote had nicknamed "the Great Martian God". Similarly, he considered Sutekh's mask to have been modelled on a statue of a bearded man dating from c.3500 BCE that had been excavated at Gebelein by Louis Lortet in 1908.

== Commercial releases ==
=== In print ===
Doctor Who and the Pyramids of Mars
- Author: Terrance Dicks
- Cover artist: Chris Achilleos
- Series: Doctor Who book: Target novelisations
- Release number: 50
- Publisher: Target Books
- Publication date: 16 December 1976
- ISBN: 0-426-11666-6

A novelisation of this serial, written by Terrance Dicks, was published by Target Books in December 1976. The novelisation contains a substantial prologue giving the history of Sutekh and the Osirans and features an epilogue in which a future Sarah researches the destruction of the Priory and how it was explained. An unabridged reading of the novelisation by actor Tom Baker was released on CD in August 2008. Pyramids of Mars was reprinted in the second volume of The Essential Terrance Dicks, published on 26 August 2021 by BBC books.

A prequel/sequel to this story, called The Sands of Time, written by Justin Richards, was released in 1996. Published by Virgin Books, it starred the Fifth Doctor.

=== Home media ===
The story first came out on VHS and Betamax in an omnibus format in February 1985, one of the first serials to do so. It was subsequently released in episodic format in February 1994. It was released on DVD in the United Kingdom on 1 March 2004, containing commentary and behind the scenes footage. It was also released on 31 October 2011 as an extra on The Sarah Jane Adventures Series 4 DVD and Blu-ray boxset.

In 2013 it was released on DVD again in the US as part of the "Doctor Who: The Doctors Revisited 1–4" box set, alongside The Aztecs, The Tomb of the Cybermen and Spearhead from Space. Alongside a documentary on the Fourth Doctor, the disc features the serial put together as a single feature in widescreen format with an introduction from show runner at the time Steven Moffat, as well as its original version.

Newly recorded music from serial's score was released on the album Pyramids of Mars by Silva Screen in 1993 along with music from other Fourth Doctor stories scored by Dudley Simpson (The Ark in Space, Genesis of the Daleks, Planet of Evil, and The Brain of Morbius).

=== Tales of the TARDIS ===
A 75 minute condensed version with updated special effects aired on BBC iPlayer on 20 June 2024, as part of the spin-off series Tales of the TARDIS.
