= Dancesport at the 2001 World Games – Latin =

Dancesport latin at the 2001 World Games
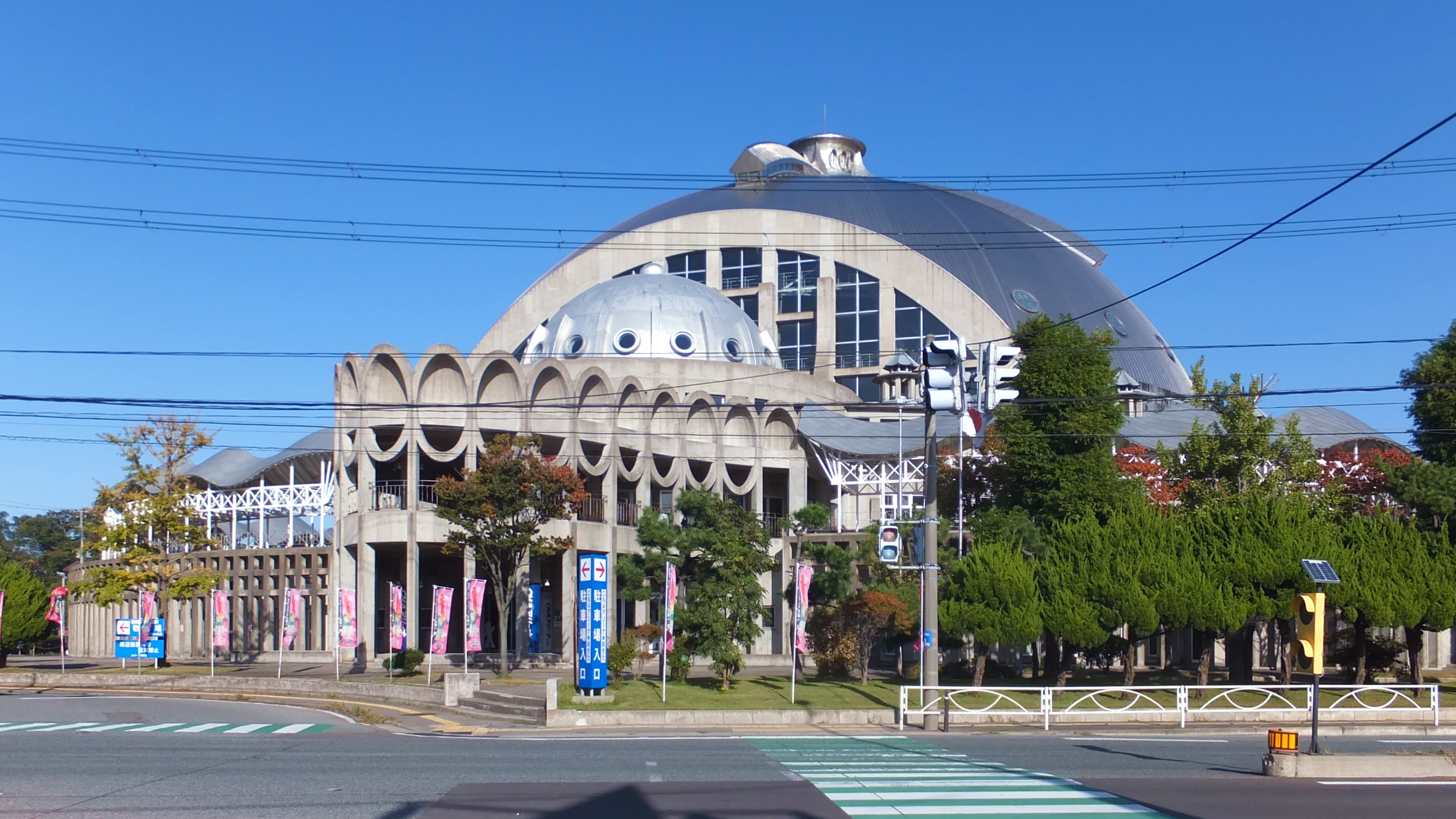
- Akita City Gymnasium
- Venue: Akita City Gymnasium
- Date: 26 August 2001
- Competitors: 46 from 21 nations

Medalists
1st place, gold medalist(s)		Andrej Škufca; Katarina Venturini	Slovenia
2nd place, silver medalist(s)		Dmitry Timokhin; Anna Bezikova	Russia
3rd place, bronze medalist(s)		Eugene Katsevman; Maria Manusova	United States

The Latin competition in dancesport at the 2001 World Games took place on 26 August 2001 at the Akita City Gymnasium in Akita, Japan.

== Competition format ==
A total of 23 pairs entered the competition. Best ten pairs from round one qualifies directly to the semifinal. In redance additional four pairs qualifies to the semifinal. From semifinal the best six pairs qualifies to the final.

== Results ==
Rank	Athletes	Nation	Round 1	Redance	Semifinal	Final
1st place, gold medalist(s)	Andrej Škufca/Katarina Venturini	Slovenia	35		35	6
2nd place, silver medalist(s)	Dmitry Timokhin/Anna Bezikova	Russia	31		32	9
3rd place, bronze medalist(s)	Eugene Katsevman/Maria Manusova	United States	35		32	15
4	Michael Malitowski/Iwona Golczak	Poland	31		30	20
5	Jan Kliment/Petra Kostovčíková	Czech Republic	26		19	26
6	Juraj Faber/Jannette Faberova	Slovakia	24		17	29
7	Stefano Di Filippo/Annalisa Di Fiacalippo	Italy	32		15	
8	Rafiek Hoosain/Janine Roach	South Africa	27		12	
9	Mikko Kaasalainen/Hanna Haarala	Finland	19		6	
10	Yukinori Sugano/Naoto Tokiwa	Japan	11	25	5	
11	Hiroyuki Ishikawa/Sumiyo Sugano	Japan	11	25	3	
11	Ojars Bacis/Santa Lodina	Latvia	20		3	
13	Stefan Green/Helen Candy	New Zealand	13	18	1	
14	David Byrns/Donna Juncken	Australia	14	24	0	
15	Aerjen Mooijweer/Monique Bloekmeulen	Netherlands	7	15		
16	Vaidotas Skimelis/Jurga Pupelyte	Lithuania	6	11		
17	Michael Kulig/Simone Mayr	Austria	1	8		
18	Roger Kwa/Marion Mou	Singapore	3	4		
19	Kevin Lin/Betty Liao	Chinese Taipei	1	3		
19	Akira Katō/Hana Katō	Japan	1	3		
21	Patrick Macorig/Paula Desjarlais	Canada	0	2		
22	Genice Marquez/Belinda Adora	Philippines	1	1		
22	Theerawut Thommuang/Kanjana Jaroon	Thailand	1	1		
