= Ood =

Alien species from Doctor Who series

- Doctor Who race
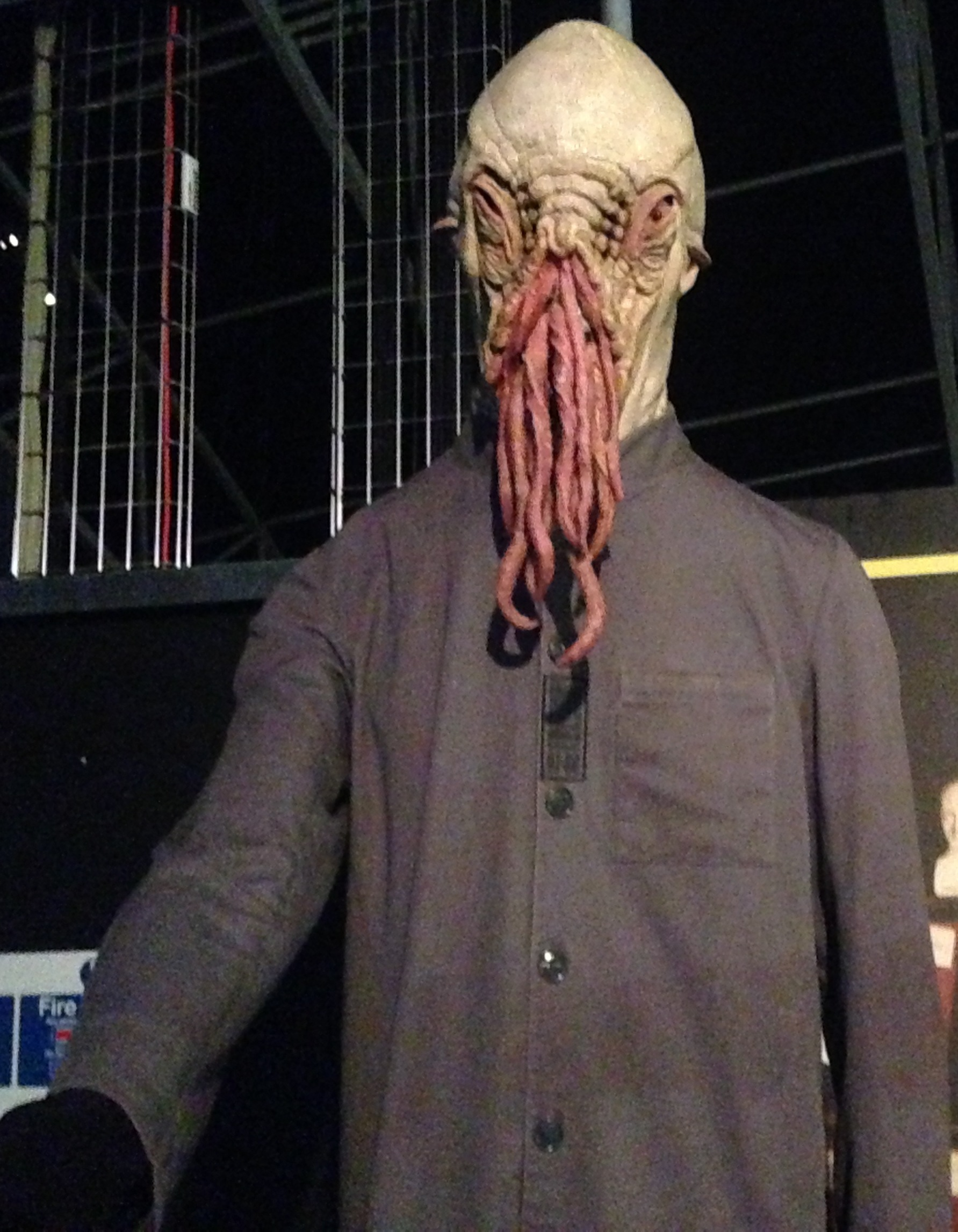
- An Ood on display at the Doctor Who Experience in 2014.
- First appearance: "The Impossible Planet" (2006)
- Created by: Russell T Davies

In-universe information
- Home world: Ood Sphere
- Affiliation: Second Great and Bountiful Human Empire; Sensorites

The Ood are an alien species from the long-running science fiction series Doctor Who. In the series' narrative, they are a peaceful race who have been enslaved by humans in the far future. The Ood are a telepathic species; however, humans—particularly the company Ood Operations—inhibited their telepathic communications, essentially lobotomising the Ood. During the course of the series, the Doctor encounters the Ood and later helps to free them from slavery.

Created by Russell T Davies, the Ood's original purpose was to fulfill the role of a "servant race" in the 2006 episodes "The Impossible Planet" and "The Satan Pit", after plans to use the Slitheen in that role fell through. Davies and the production team felt there was more room to explore the Ood's history in the show's universe, and due to both that and a highly positive public reception of the Ood, they were brought back for the 2008 episode "Planet of the Ood".

The Ood have been a subject of analysis by various sources. Parallels between the in-universe treatment of the Ood and real-world instances of slavery and exploitation, in particular, have been a topic of significant discussion. Some analysts have also said that the Ood are seen as inferior and given the othering treatment not because of any wrongdoing on their part, but rather due to their different preferences and cultural priorities.

== Appearances ==
=== Characteristics ===
Doctor Who is a long-running British science-fiction television series that began in 1963. Its main protagonist, The Doctor, is an alien who travels through time and space in a ship known as the TARDIS along with their (Note: The Doctor does not have a gender—and has assumed different genders in the past—so they are referred to with the singular they in this generic context.) travelling companions. When the Doctor dies, they undergo a process known as regeneration, completely changing their appearance and personality. Throughout their travels, the Doctor often comes into conflict with various alien species and antagonists.

In the show's universe, the Ood are a peaceful race that hail from a planet known as the Ood-Sphere. They have three brains: one in their head, a hindbrain they hold in their hands, and a massive brain-like entity that connects the Ood psychically like a hivemind. The Ood exert a telepathic field, and they have a song they sing to each other telepathically. The Ood race was enslaved by the company Ood Operations; the company manufactured propaganda—aimed at potential buyers—which claimed that the Ood enjoyed working as slaves, and that their species was naturally inclined towards slavery. The Ood's hindbrains were cut off and replaced by an orb that translates what they say to humans; the collective brain was sealed within a dampening field, which, combined with the hindbrain's disconnection, inhibited their telepathic communication to such an extent as to lobotomise them. The Ood are mistreated by those who own them, with scanners in one story considering Ood more akin to livestock than sentient beings. Though most accept the Ood's slavery as a fact of life, a group known as "Friends of the Ood" seeks to free the Ood from slavery, though they are not considered very influential as an organisation.

=== Television ===
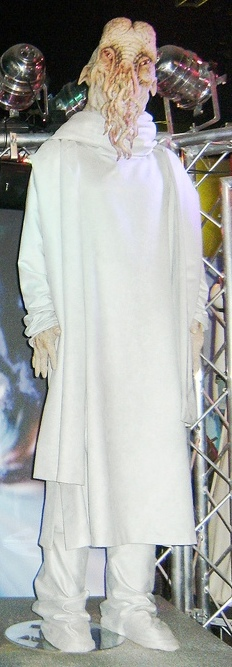
The Elder Ood, who appeared in "The End of Time", as shown at the Doctor Who Experience.

The Ood debuted in the 2006 episodes "The Impossible Planet" and "The Satan Pit". The Ood are used as slaves by a group of humans on the planet Krop Tor, which is near a black hole. Though the Tenth Doctor's companion, Rose Tyler, questions the Ood's slavery, the Doctor accepts their enslavement and is quickly distracted by other matters. The Ood have been possessed—by exploiting their collective psychic link—by a creature known as the Beast; it attempts to use them to free itself from its prison beneath Krop Tor's surface. Rose and the crew are able to render the Ood unconscious, and after the Beast's demise, the Ood, alongside Krop Tor, were sucked into the black hole.

The Ood re-appear in the 2008 episode "Planet of the Ood". The Doctor visits the Ood-Sphere where they encounter the base of Ood Operations, which manages the distribution of Ood throughout the human empire of the far-future. The Ood's collective brain, trapped within the dampening sphere, has begun to break free and contact other Ood, coordinating a revolt against the company. Ood Operations' leader, Klineman Halpen, attempts to kill the brain—a move that would exterminate the Ood—but Halpen's servant, Ood Sigma, tricks Halpen into drinking, under the guise of hair tonic, a liquid that turns Halpen into an Ood. The Doctor, learning the truth of the Ood, strives to help them; he aids in breaking the dampening sphere, freeing the Ood from slavery and restoring their telepathic abilities. The Ood from across the empire are subsequently brought back to the Ood-Sphere.

Ood Sigma returns in the 2009 episode "The Waters of Mars", where he attempts to contact the Doctor. The Doctor subsequently visits the Ood-Sphere in the following story, "The End of Time" (2009-2010). Due to damage done to time, the Ood have advanced rapidly, and are now able to project themselves through time. The Ood Elder reveals a dream to the Doctor about his enemy, the Master, which makes the Doctor return to Earth to stop him. Following the Master's defeat, Ood Sigma gives the Doctor encouragement as he regenerates.

A single Ood—referred to as Nephew—appears in the 2011 episode "The Doctor's Wife". Nephew is under the influence of an alien entity called House, who controls Nephew and uses him to attack the Doctor's companions Amy and Rory. Nephew is later killed inadvertently by the Eleventh Doctor. In the mini episode "Death is the Only Answer", the scientist Albert Einstein is transformed into a red-eyed Ood after ingesting a mysterious liquid; the Doctor is later able to revert Einstein back to normal. In the Pond Life mini-series, a single Ood accidentally wanders into Amy and Rory's house and becomes their butler for a few days.

An Ood appears in the 2021 episode "Survivors of the Flux", serving as the Time Lord Tecteun's assistant. Tecteun is attempting to power an antimatter wave, known as the Flux, to destroy the remaining universe. After Tecteun is killed by Swarm and Azure, the Ood assists the Doctor in altering the Flux's course.

=== In spin-offs ===
Ood appear in the short stories The Heist (2018) and Disappearing Act (2008), and the comic story Time of the Ood. (2017) The audio drama series The War Master: Master of Callous depicts an incarnation of the Master seizing control of a group of Ood. They later appear in the Torchwood audio drama series, where they appear in a trilogy of 2023 releases dubbed Odyssey, Oodunit, and Oracle. The Ood also appear in the audio drama Prisoner of the Ood (2018). An Ood named Brian appears as an assassin in the Time Lord Victorious crossover story, which depicts the character across several forms of media in a recurring role.

== Development ==
The Ood first appear in the 2006 two-part story "The Impossible Planet" and "The Satan Pit", co-written by writers Matt Jones and Russell T Davies. Davies created the Ood and owns their copyright, and he is credited for further re-appearances of the creatures in the series. Originally, the Ood's role as servants was planned to be taken on by the Slitheen—a crime family attempting to redeem themselves for past offences—but this was scrapped due to a fear they were "dominating" the story, with Davies instead choosing to create a new alien species, in part due to the costume cost being the same as refurbishing the existing Sitheen costumes. Davies chose a simplistic name—"Ood"—for the new species; they were also given a tentacle-covered face to eliminate the need to design mouths for the costumes. The appearance of the Ood was designed by Neil Gorton of the company Millennium FX. Performers for the Ood were briefed that the Ood should originally appear sympathetic and later be made scary; actors were unable to see inside of the masks used for the Ood costumes, which had lights inside to allow their eyes to glow red when possessed by the Beast. Actor Paul Kasey's Ood mask had the ability to blink and have its forehead wrinkle via radio control.

The Ood proved to be popular both with the public and the production team. Davies, in particular, felt that the Ood were ripe for further exploration, wanting to also bring back a monster that had first been made for the show's revival. Despite some plans to bring the Ood back for the 2007 episode "42", which would have seen a group of Ood stored away in a ship's cargo hold for black market sale, the Ood did not re-appear until the 2008 episode "Planet of the Ood". The Ood would be a much larger focus in this story than they had been in their prior appearance, with Davies seeking to make the audience sympathise with the Ood. To do this, he gave them external brains that were lobotomized by the company Ood Operations. The episode was based heavily around the Doctor and his companion Donna's, responses to the Ood—in particular via the Doctor recognising truths about the Ood's way of life he had not previously considered. The character of Ood Sigma was also introduced, distinct from the rest of his species with a differently colored suit with a sigma symbol on it. Davies wanted an episode with an "ice planet", resulting in the Ood-Sphere being made a cold climate. Initially planned as a two-part episode, Davies felt the story would be stronger if it was simpler, and elected to keep the Ood's re-appearance down to one episode.

Sensorites as they appear in The Sensorites (1964). The Sensorites' appearance and abilities were relevant to the Ood's creation, and resulted in an in-universe relationship between the two races being established.

While writing the Ood's first appearance, Davies's image of a group of bald, suited, identical aliens was inspired by the Sensorites—a fictional alien species that first appeared in the 1964 serial The Sensorites. Davies believed that the Ood would have hailed from a planet near the Sense-Sphere, the Sensorites' home planet; the subsequent Ood story "Planet of the Ood" revealed this detail. The Ood physically resemble and have similar abilities to the Sensorites, though according to the book Who Is the Doctor: The Unofficial Guide to Doctor Who: The New Series, the similarities between the Ood and Sensorites were originally unintentional, with Davies only realising the connection during development; this resulted in the production team trying to distance the two species in subsequent episodes.

The Ood's role in "The End of Time" was planned in the original outlines of the story; Davies wanted to depict a long duration of time having passed since Planet of the Ood, with the Ood having evolved as a species since the Doctor last saw them. One of Davies' plans for the story included giving the Doctor an Ood "spirit guide" as a companion, though this was later scrapped, and Wilfred Mott became the Doctor's companion instead. In this story, the Ood established their own civilisation on the Ood-Sphere, which the script stated would resemble the 6th-century Jordanian city of Petra. The Elder Ood's location was described as being akin to a "Holy Man's retreat", separate from the rest of the city. The Wookey Hole Caves in Somerset were used for filming scenes set on the Ood-Sphere, while the Ood city itself was created with CGI.

The Ood Elder is voiced by Brian Cox, and all other Ood are voiced by Silas Carson. The Ood's theme songs, Song for Freedom and Vale Decem, were sung by singer Mark Chambers.

== Analysis ==
Erica Foss, writing in the book Doctor Who and Race, drew comparisons between the Ood's depiction within the series and real-world instances of slavery, particularly in the form of European expansionism and the mass enslavement that came with it. Foss discussed how the Ood were often othered in the series, including being referred to with animalistic terms that made the Ood seem "lesser" in the eyes of humans, and thus easier to enslave without moral qualms by many characters in the show's universe, including even the Doctor when he first meets them. Foss stated that the Ood's treatment, as well as the Doctor's willingness to accept he had been wrong about them and change to help them, reminded audiences that "humans must never cease to strive for progress, tolerance and understanding." The book The Humanism of Doctor Who: A Critical Study in Science Fiction and Philosophy stated that "Planet of the Ood" used references to slavery to instill a sense of sympathy for the Ood and disdain for the Ood Operations company, enabling a critique of capitalist companies by showing how they engage in the exploitation of sentient creatures.

The book The Language of Doctor Who: From Shakespeare to Alien Tongues states that the Ood have a fundamentally different sense of freedom from that of humans; they do not have the concept of individual freedom, like humans do, but rather view freedom as reconnecting with the rest of their kind. The book Cultural Legal Studies of Science Fiction similarly stated that the Ood are differentiated by humans due to the fact they are often treated as a "collective", and additionally treat themselves as a single hivemind. It also states that the Ood's usage of silence—primarily in how it results in both viewers and in-universe characters assuming that they are naturally preferential to enslavement—shows the power of language in understanding different perspectives, as it resulted in an assumption that humans—who could talk more than the Ood—were superior to them. The book examined how these differences, in conjunction with the threat the Ood were often represented as in the series, resulted in fears of the "other" kicking in and characterising the Ood as "monsters", despite the Ood being a friendly race. The book states that the Ood are an example of understanding alien species and considering them "people" outside of the context of a human perspective, allowing humans to accept the Ood for what they are without one race being fundamentally "superior" to the other.

The book Doctor Who: A British Alien? suggested that the Ood's eventual evolution as a species, which eschewed scientific principles, capitalism, and individualism, was an example of the series showing that the Western lifestyle—often touted within both the series and British culture as superior—was not fundamentally a better way of life than others. The book Doctor Who and History: Critical Essays on Imagining the Past similarly compared the Ood to real-world slavery, particularly the slavery of African people; however, it criticised the show for making various white characters the defenders the Ood in their episodes, saying that this constructed a white saviour narrative—which, the author says, was used to disregard past crimes committed via British imperialism in real life. Additionally, it stated that the Doctor and Donna being almost "worshipped" by the Ood—despite doing considerably less to help free the Ood than the Ood did themselves—perpetuated ideas akin to The White Man's Burden and reinforced the idea of slaves as being a people who are "unable to save [themselves]".
