= Haarala =

Haarala is a Finnish surname. Notable people with the surname include:

- Hanna Haarala, Finnish dancer
- Hannu Haarala (born 1981), Finnish footballer
- Santeri Haarala (born 1999), Finnish footballer
