= Planet of the Ood =

191 – "Planet of the Ood"
- Doctor Who episode

Cast
- Doctor: David Tennant – Tenth Doctor
- Companion: Catherine Tate – Donna Noble
- Others: Tim McInnerny – Mr Halpen; Ayesha Dharker – Solana Mercurio; Adrian Rawlins – Dr Ryder; Roger Griffiths – Commander Kess; Paul Clayton – Mr Bartle; Paul Kasey – Ood Sigma; Tariq Jorden – Rep; Silas Carson – Voice of the Ood

Production
- Directed by: Graeme Harper
- Written by: Keith Temple
- Produced by: Phil Collinson
- Executive producers: Russell T Davies; Julie Gardner
- Music by: Murray Gold
- Production code: 4.2
- Series: Series 4
- Running time: 45 minutes
- First broadcast: 19 April 2008

Chronology
← Preceded by "The Fires of Pompeii"	Followed by → "The Sontaran Stratagem"

"Planet of the Ood" is the third episode of the fourth series of the British science fiction television series Doctor Who. It was broadcast on BBC One on 19 April 2008.

The episode takes place in the year 4126 on the Ood-Sphere, the titular planet of the episode. The Tenth Doctor (David Tennant) and his companion Donna Noble (Catherine Tate) investigate Ood Operations, a company that is selling the Ood as a servant race, to discover the reason the Ood are happy to serve. When they find a group of unprocessed Ood, they become horrified at the alterations performed and resolve to free the Ood.

The episode was watched by 7.5 million viewers and received highly positive reviews, with critics praising Tate’s performance and the central theme of slavery.

== Plot ==
On the planet Ood-Sphere in 4126, a company called Ood Operations has been harvesting and selling the Ood as slaves for 200 years. Solana, the head of marketing, tells the CEO Mr Halpen that three people have been killed in the last financial quarter, and the method of killing each time is identical: the victims are electrocuted by the Ood's translation spheres. Halpen and Dr Ryder, the head of Ood management, go to a secure warehouse to check on the Ood brain, a giant telepathic centre which connects the Ood in a telepathic song, and has been obstructed by a circle of pylons emitting a barrier for 200 years. The Ood have also had part of their brain, which they carry in their hands, lobotomised and replaced with the translation sphere to make them subservient. Ryder is an activist for Friends of the Ood, who slowly infiltrated the company to gain access to the pylons and lower the barrier to their minimum setting to cause the Ood to start a revolution against humanity. Individual rebellions had broken out over time as the Ood brain adapted, though Ryder believed this had progressed too slowly.

Meanwhile, the Tenth Doctor and Donna, posing as company representatives, investigate Ood Operations. They become concerned by the treatment of the Ood. The Doctor and Donna hear the Ood singing their song of captivity and are captured by Ood Operations' security force. The Doctor and Donna escape after convincing the rebelling Ood they are their friends and follow Halpen to the warehouse containing the giant Ood brain. Halpen plans to kill the brain with mines and to cull the Ood servants. Upon learning of Ryder's deception, Halpen kills him by throwing him into the brain. Halpen's personal Ood servant, Ood Sigma, has been using Halpen's hair loss medication to slowly convert Halpen into an Ood; he becomes fully converted after threatening the Doctor and Donna's lives. Ood Sigma tells the Doctor and Donna that he will take care of Halpen.

The Doctor shuts down the pylons and the mines, freeing the Ood and allowing them all to sing in a telepathic collective. The Ood’s song resonates across the galaxies, and humans decide to return their Ood servants back to the Ood-Sphere. Ood Sigma promises to include the "Doctor-Donna" in the Ood's song. He also tells the Doctor that his song will soon be ending.

=== Continuity ===
The red eye phenomenon in the Ood is a symptom of their being possessed. In "The Impossible Planet" and "The Satan Pit" they were under the Beast's control. In this episode, the red eye was caused by the telepathic link between the Ood and the Ood Brain.

The Ood-Sphere is in the same planetary system as the Sense-Sphere, the location for the 1964 serial The Sensorites; the Sensorites and Ood are visually and mentally similar.

== Production ==
We wanted to know more about the Ood's background. This time around, they're centre stage. The story is about them. Why they are the way they are. What makes them tick.

— Keith Temple

The episode was written by Keith Temple and directed by Graeme Harper. Executive producer Russell T Davies had envisioned the Ood's return because their previous appearance, the 2006 two-part story "The Impossible Planet" and "The Satan Pit", had been overshadowed by the appearance of the Devil. Davies subsequently provided Temple with a brief for the episode which included the term "ice planet" and the storyline of a business selling the Ood as a commodity. Temple's drafts of the episode were described as "too dark" and "too old Doctor Who"; Temple stated on the episode's commentary that his early draft was "a six-part [serial] in 45 minutes".

Temple and Davies thought that the episode was not a "fun reappearance" of an old monster; instead, they felt that there was "an actual story to tell". Temple emphasised in his script that the Doctor overlooked the Ood under the shadow of the Devil, and the character had to see his shortcomings. Temple's script also emphasised the Ood's slavery; both Temple and lead actor David Tennant commented that the existence of a species born to serve was complicated, the latter stating complications with Richard Dawkins' selfish gene theory. Donna's role in the episode was to further humanise the Doctor, and her opinion of the Ood changing from her initial disgust at their appearance to empathy for them was important to the episode and her character development. Susie Liggat cited the writing as part of Doctor Who's importance—she thought the story about "liberating oppressed people" could be applied domestically or globally.

The episode's antagonist, Mr Halpen, is portrayed by Tim McInnerny. Davies considered his character—"a middle manager who's out of his depth"—a perfect villain. Temple described him as "narcissistic", "preening" and "ruthless ... without sentiment". McInnerny said "It's always nice to play a bastard... I'm glad Halpen's a three-dimensional bastard! That makes him interesting!". Temple epitomised Halpen in a scene where he kills an operative for the activist group "Friends of the Ood"; Davies and Tennant felt that his "disgusting" and "gothic ... Edgar Allan Poe" fate would be undeserved otherwise.

Filming for the episode took place in August 2007. The opening and closing outdoor scenes were filmed in Trefil Quarry, on the outskirts of Tredegar, overlooking the Brecon Beacons. Trefil has been used several times including during the film adaptation of The Hitchhikers Guide to the Galaxy. The external scenes of the complex were filmed at Aberthaw Cement Works, and scenes in the "battery farm" were filmed in a hangar at MOD St Athan. CGI was used sparingly in production; the snow was paper snow adhered by water, and the Ood heads contained complex animatronics. McInnerny wore a prosthetic mask with two layers for his transformation scene though the production team's best boy, Peter Chester, provided motion capture for the computer-generated profile of the appendages coming out of his mouth when this needed to be refilmed and McInnerny was unavailable.

== Reception ==
"Planet of the Ood" was the most watched programme in its timeslot, with 7.5 million viewers. The episode was the second most-watched programme of the day, beaten by Britain's Got Talent, and was the twelfth most watched programme of the week. The episode's Appreciation Index was 87 (considered Excellent).

Scott Matthewman, writing for The Stage, gave a mixed review of the episode. He thought that "pretty much the only surprise in the way the humans who made up the Ood Corporation were presented came as PR girl Solana (Ayesha Dharker) escaped with the Doctor and Donna, only to betray their position by calling for the guards," and "the revelation that Ryder (Adrian Rawlins) has been working to infiltrate the Corporation is thrown away... as quickly as it is revealed." However, he thought Donna was becoming "fast ... one of the strongest and most well-rounded companions in the series' history", and "there were some nice interpretations of the Ood’s natural development". Caitlin Moran of The Times thought the episode was "really really good ... – one that will have you staring at your screen and asking, once again, 'How can something so good be happening so early on a Saturday night, in my own front room?'". She enjoyed the scene where the Doctor and Donna talk about slaves in contemporary culture, saying that Tate "really, really isn’t that bad when she says ["We don't have slaves."]". Ben Rawson-Jones of Digital Spy gave the episode five stars out of five. Rawson-Jones opened his review by saying "Doctor Who can occasionally transcend the properties of a mere family television show to reach out and give viewers a poignant, beautiful epiphany and greater sense of the world they inhabit," citing Donna's reaction on seeing the uncultivated Ood as the moving part of the episode. He thought the episode as a whole "exemplifies just how powerful and emotive Doctor Who can be when writing, direction and performance are all harmonious and complete their own Ood-like circle", and was appreciative of the acting. The episode's only flaw was when Donna said "Why do you say 'Miss'? Do I look single?", but was otherwise "an extremely impressive, contemplative examination of the abhorrent nature of humanity".

== In print ==
Planet of the Ood
- Author: Keith Temple
- Series: Doctor Who book: Target novelisations
- Publisher: BBC Books
- Publication date: 13 July 2023
- ISBN: 9781785948268

A Target Novelisation of this story, written by Keith Temple, was announced on 19 January 2023, to be released in July.
