= The Impossible Planet =

174a – "The Impossible Planet"
- Doctor Who episode

Cast
- Doctor: David Tennant – Tenth Doctor
- Companion: Billie Piper – Rose Tyler
- Others: Danny Webb – Mr. Jefferson; Shaun Parkes – Zachary Cross Flane; Claire Rushbrook – Ida Scott; Will Thorp – Toby Zed; Ronny Jhutti – Danny Bartock; MyAnna Buring – Scooti Manista; Paul Kasey – The Ood; Gabriel Woolf – Voice of the Beast; Silas Carson – Voice of the Ood

Production
- Directed by: James Strong
- Written by: Matt Jones
- Produced by: Phil Collinson
- Executive producers: Russell T Davies; Julie Gardner
- Music by: Murray Gold
- Production code: 2.8
- Series: Series 2
- Running time: 1st of 2-part story, 45 minutes
- First broadcast: 3 June 2006

Chronology
← Preceded by "The Idiot's Lantern"	Followed by → "The Satan Pit"

"The Impossible Planet" is the eighth episode of the second series of the British science fiction television series Doctor Who, which was first broadcast on BBC One on 3 June 2006. It is the first part of a two-part story. The second part, "The Satan Pit", was broadcast on 10 June.

The episode is set on Krop Tor, a planet orbiting a black hole. In the episode, a human expedition group drilling on the planet is terrorised by a creature calling itself the Beast (voiced by Gabriel Woolf), which possesses the Ood slaves in the humans' base.

== Plot ==
The TARDIS arrives aboard a sanctuary base used for deep-space expeditions. The Tenth Doctor and Rose explore the area, discovering strange alien writing that the TARDIS is unable to translate, meaning that it is "impossibly old". They are then confronted by the Ood, a docile race of empathic slaves who work on the station. After a misunderstanding with the Ood, the Doctor and Rose meet the crew of the base: commanding officer Zach, scientist Ida, security officer Jefferson, "ethics committee" Danny, engineer Scooti and archaeologist Toby. The crew are on an expedition on the mysterious planet Krop Tor, impossibly in orbit around a black hole. Captain Zach explains that a gravity funnel exists around the planet, allowing them to safely enter or leave the vicinity of the black hole. The source of the funnel is an immense energy force ten miles within the planet, which they are drilling towards to understand its power. As the Doctor and Rose are acquainting themselves with the crew, the base is struck by a quake that causes the section of the base containing the TARDIS to fall into the planet. Rose and the Doctor resign themselves to being trapped and begin helping out the crew.

As the drill nears its target, a malevolent presence begins to make itself known. The Ood's translation spheres reveal messages about the Beast awakening, while Toby is unknowingly possessed by the Beast after examining pottery. The possessed Toby kills Scooti when she discovers him surviving outside the base without any protective gear. When the drilling is complete, the Doctor offers to go with Ida into the bowels of the planet. After travelling down the drill shaft, the Doctor and Ida find a large circular pit inscribed with more undecipherable markings on the rims. The Doctor believes it to be a door, and they watch as it opens. Suddenly, the Beast repossesses Toby before transferring into all the Ood as they refer to themselves as the Legion of the Beast. With Rose and the remaining crew alerted that the planet is now falling towards the black hole, the Ood begin to close in on them whilst the voice of the Beast declares that it is free.

== Production ==
Writer Matt Jones also wrote, as Matthew Jones, the Virgin New Adventures novel Bad Therapy, featuring the Seventh Doctor and Chris Cwej. He was script editor on Russell T Davies' Channel 4 series Queer as Folk.

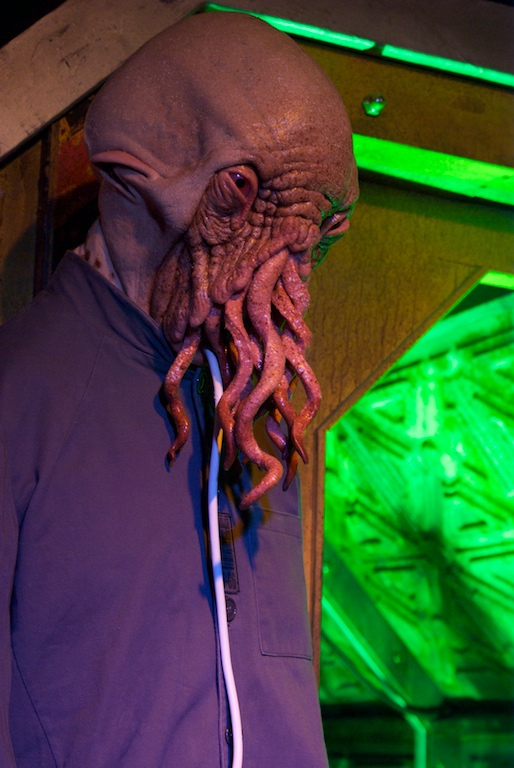
The Ood as they appeared in the Doctor Who Experience.

Executive producer and chief writer Russell T Davies said that an early draft of the script called for the role of the Ood to be filled by Raxacoricofallapatorians, the same species as the Slitheen. Their race would have been enslaved and they wished to awaken the Beast, whom they believed to be a god that could free them. It was Davies, not the episode's writer Jones who chose the name of the Ood; he intended it to be a play on the word "odd". In the accompanying Doctor Who Confidential episode, Davies said that he likes to think that the Ood come from a planet near to that of the Sensorites from the First Doctor serial The Sensorites (1964), as he suggests the races are similar in some respects. In "Planet of the Ood", this is confirmed. During an interview with the production crew, it was noted that the sanctuary base was based on the spaceship Nostromo from the movie Alien.

Scenes of bodies floating in space were filmed on the underwater stage at Pinewood Studios, the first time the series has used this facility, not counting the charity special Doctor Who and the Curse of Fatal Death. This is the first episode of the 2005 revival of Doctor Who to use a quarry as an alien planet — quarries were frequently used in this manner in the original series. Davies was not a fan of this production decision. The Ood masks had their eyes in non-human positions, so the actors who played them had to see out of pin prick sized holes in the masks.

=== Cast notes ===
The voice of the Beast is provided by Gabriel Woolf, who also played Sutekh the Destroyer in the Fourth Doctor serial Pyramids of Mars (1975), and later in the Fifteenth Doctor episodes The Legend of Ruby Sunday and Empire of Death (2024). One of the names that the possessed Ood have for the Beast is Satan. The Fourth Doctor also stated that Sutekh has been known by many aliases, including the Typhonian beast and Satan. However, Woolf was cast only after the episode had been written and filmed. Originally, the producers sought out Piper's then husband Chris Evans for the role.

Danny Webb also appeared in the audio plays The Girl Who Never Was and The Dark Husband. Shaun Parkes previously starred with David Tennant in the BBC's 2005 Casanova serial written by Russell T Davies. Silas Carson previously played various alien voices in "The End of the World", while Paul Kasey is a veteran at playing various monsters for Doctor Who and Torchwood.

== Broadcast and reception ==
Overnight viewing figures for the episode were 5.94 million, peaking at 6.78 million. However, the episode still obtained a 39.8% share of the audience and was the second highest rated programme of the evening, behind Casualty. The final ratings for the episode were 6.32 million viewers.

This episode and "The Satan Pit" were released in the UK, together with "Love & Monsters", as a basic DVD with no special features on 7 August 2006.

IGN's Ahsan Haque gave the episode a score of 9.3 out of 10, describing it as "an extremely well written and directed episode with awesome visuals and excellent sound design". Though he noted that "much of this episode felt a bit like watching a moderately entertaining B-movie like Event Horizon", he thought it was "presented with ample flair and charm". Dek Hogan of Digital Spy stated the episode got the series "back on form", though he noted that losing the TARDIS was becoming tiresome. Dave Golder, writing for SFX, felt that the two-parter abandoned Doctor Who's "manic energy, a level of wit and an idiosyncratic visual approach" for more traditional science fiction, which made it look at times like "Stargate lite". While he thought the spaceship looked "silly", he praised the support cast and especially Tennant and Piper. Of "The Impossible Planet" he stated, "The build-up of the mystery was superbly paced and intriguing. The characters were fleshed out with masterful economy. The tension was tangible. The villain felt dangerous. And in the idea of an evil entity taking control of a telepathically linked race we had the kind of good, solid SF idea – simple and technobabble-free enough for the non-SF literate audience to grasp – in which the new series should be trading. It helps that the Ood were such a great piece of design work, as well."

== In popular culture ==
In a September 2013 National Geographic Daily News article, the author mentioned this episode while discussing planets that surround black holes.

== In print ==
A novelisation of this episode and "The Satan Pit" written by Matt Jones was released as a paperback, ebook, and an audiobook on 26 March 2026 under the title The Satan Pit as part of the Target Collection.
