= Silas Carson =

English actor (born 1965)

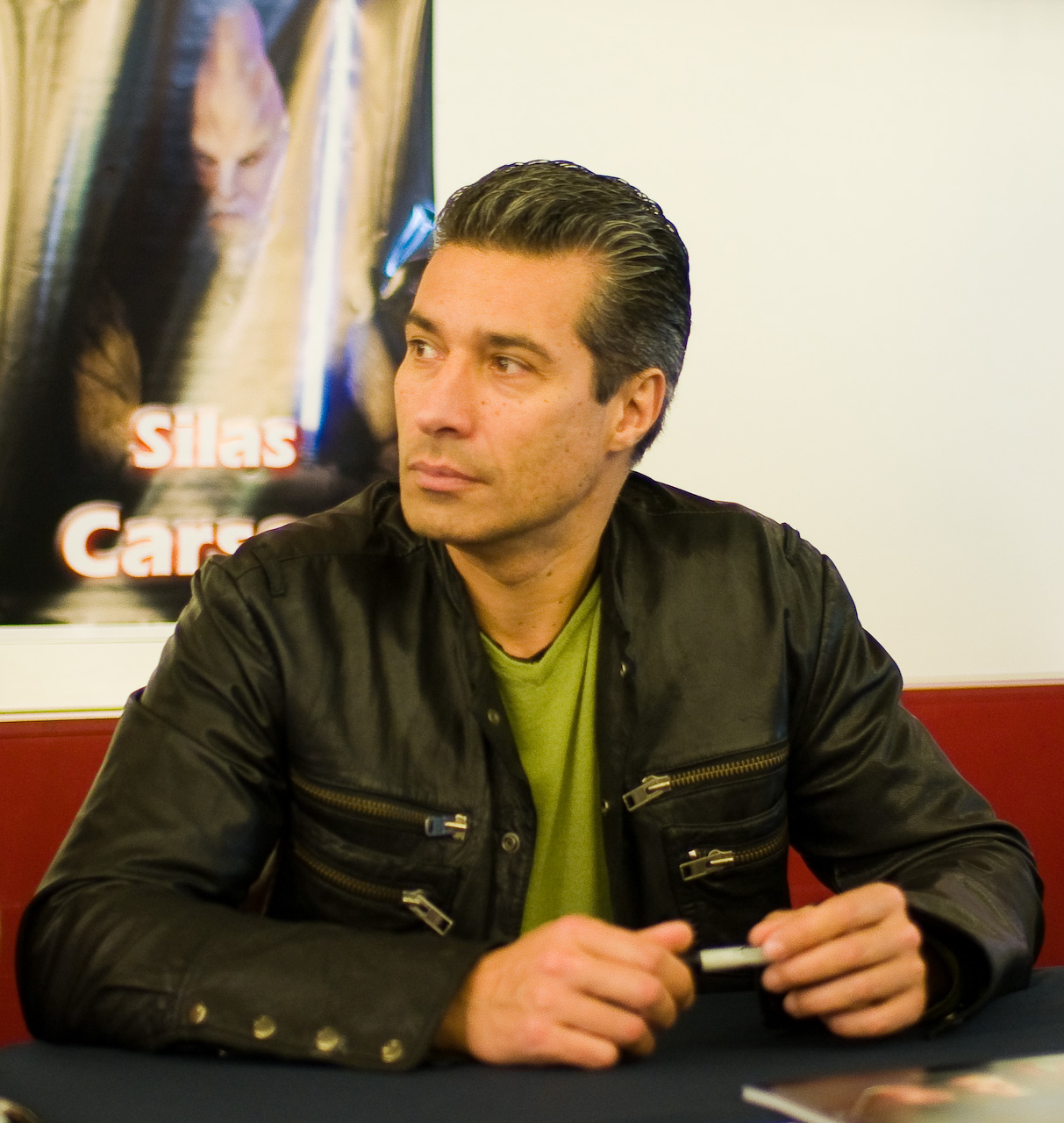
- Silas Carson at F.A.C.T.S. 2008
- Born: 1965 (age 60–61); Westminster, London, England
- Occupations: Actor, voice actor
- Years active: 1992–present

Silas Carson (born 1965) is an English actor. He played the Cerean Jedi Master Ki-Adi-Mundi and the Neimoidian Viceroy Nute Gunray in all three of the Star Wars prequels, as well as providing the voice of the Ood in Doctor Who.

== Career ==
In addition to his primary roles in Star Wars: Episode I – The Phantom Menace, Carson provided extra speaking parts for the characters of Lott Dod and Antidar Williams, respectively; the former was a senator of the Trade Federation (although his voice was replaced with that of actor Toby Longworth) and the latter was a co-pilot on the ship in which Qui-Gon Jinn (Liam Neeson) and Obi-Wan Kenobi (Ewan McGregor) were passengers (in the first scene).

Carson made a guest appearance on the BBC series Hustle, as Bollywood film fan and perfectionist Kulvinder Samar, and in Spooks and The IT Crowd. He provided alien voices for the Doctor Who episodes "The End of the World", "The Impossible Planet", "The Satan Pit", "Planet of the Ood" and "The End of Time". In the latter four episodes, he voiced the Ood, a race once enslaved by humanity. He has reprised this role in audio dramas for Big Finish Productions.

In late 2007, Carson appeared in several episodes of the BBC's school drama Waterloo Road as a blackmailer Stuart Hordley. He had a minor role in series one of the BBC sit-com Outnumbered, as a character named Ravi, when Sue and Pete had a dinner party.

Carson starred in the third series of BBC3 comedy How Not to Live Your Life alongside Dan Clark and David Armand, portraying Samantha's university professor-love interest, Brian.

Carson starred in the DCI Banks episode "Buried" (2015) as Raheel Kamel.

== Filmography ==
Year	Title	Format	Role	Notes
1993	Horse Opera	Film	Colin	
1996	Cold Lazarus	Television	First Sentry, MSC Guard	Episodes 1 and 3
1997	Supply & Demand	Film	VO15 Officer	
1997	Saving Grace	Film	Man with dog	
1997	Fever Pitch	Film	Indian waiter	
1998	Jeremiah	Film	Hananiah	
1999	Star Wars: Episode I – The Phantom Menace	Film	Nute Gunray / Ki-Adi-Mundi / Lott Dod / Antidar Williams	4 roles
1999	Metrosexuality	Television	Jonno	
1999	The Bill	Television	John Trimmer	Episode: "Lucky Jim"
1999	An Unsuitable Job for a Woman	Television	Simon Wright	Episode: "Living on Risk"
2000	Innocents	Film	Ash Pavade	
2001	Always and Everyone	Television	Rash Amin	Episode 3.3
2002	Star Wars: Episode II – Attack of the Clones	Film	Ki-Adi-Mundi / Nute Gunray	Double role
2002	The Project	Film	Clive	
2004	Hidalgo	Film	Katib	
2004	Waking the Dead	Television	DI Crowther	Episode: "Fugue States: Part 1"
2004	The Predator	Film		
2004	The Grid	Television	Dr. Raghib Mutar	2 episodes
2004	Lie with Me	Film	Saul Pierson	
2005	Star Wars: Episode III – Revenge of the Sith	Film	Ki-Adi-Mundi / Nute Gunray	Double role
2005	Cromophobia	Film	Yoga instructor	
2005	William and Mary	Television	Mr. Ormerond	Episodes 3.1, 3.5 and 3.6
2005	Absolute Power	Television	Reza Bin Laden	Episode: "The Nation's Favourite"
2005	Spooks	Television	The Prince	Episode: "Road Trip"
2005–2010; 2021	Doctor Who	Television	Alien voices, The Ood (voice), Ood Sigma (voice)	Six episodes: "The End of the World" (2005) "The Impossible Planet" (2006) "The Satan Pit" (2006) "Planet of the Ood" (2008) "The End of Time": Parts 1 and 2 (2009–10) "Survivors of the Flux"/"The Vanquishers" (2021)
2006	Hustle	Television	Kulvinder Samar	Episode: "A Bollywood Dream"
2006	The Ten Commandments	Film	Jered	
2006–2007	The Bill	Television	Officer Marcus Swift	
2007	Flawless	Film	Reece	
2007	The IT Crowd	Television	Derek Pippen	Episode: "Return of the Golden Child"
2007	Outnumbered	Television	Ravi	Episode 1.6
2007	The Sarah Jane Adventures	Television	Kudlak (voice), Emperor (voice)	Episode: "Warriors of Kudlak" (Parts 1 and 2)
2007–2008	Waterloo Road	Television	Stuart Hordley	Series 3
2008	Heroes and Villains	Television	Al-Adil	Episode: "Richard the Lionheart"
2008	Bonekickers	Television	Kahmil	Episode: "The Cradle of Civilisation"
2009	Hunter	Television	Ari Assad	Episode 1.2
2009	Transgress	Film	Man	
2009	Boogie Woogie	Film	Surgeon	
2009	The Philanthropist	Television		Episode: "Kashmir"
2010	How Not to Live Your Life	Television	Brian	Season 3
2010	MI High	Television	Well Fit Jim	Season 4.3
2010	Pimp	Film	Punter	
2011	Holby City	Television	Sunil Bhatti	Series 13
2012	National Theatre Live: The Comedy of Errors	Film	Balthaser	
2012	Cleanskin	Film	Amin	
2013	Doctors	Television	DCS James Blake	Series 15
2013	Locke	Film	Dr. Gullu	Voice
2013	It's a Lot	Film	Mr. Patel	
2014	Blood Cells	Film	Tariq	
2014	Dying of the Light	Film	Dr. Sanjar	
2015	The Casual Vacancy	BBC mini series	Vikram Jawanda	
2015	Tut	Spike miniseries	Akhenaten	
2015	Miss You Already	Film	Dr. Butala	
2016	EastEnders	Television	Haroon Zaman	Episode 5381
2017	Phantom Thread	Film	Rubio Gurrerro	
2018	Trust	Television	Bullimore (Jahangir Khan)	Season 1
2018	Postcards from London	Film	George	
2019	The Corrupted	Film	Mayor Ahmad	
2020	Star Wars: The Clone Wars	Television	Ki-Adi-Mundi	Archive voice recording; episode: "Shattered"
2020	The Other One	Television	Mr Shray Tandell	1 episode
2020	Des	Television	Russell Cavendish	1 episode
2021	Midsomer Murders	Television	Reuben Tooms	Episode: "The Stitcher Society"
2023	The Gold	Television	Harry Bowman	5 episodes
2024	Father Brown	Television	Professor Alexander Prichard	Episode: "The Word of the Condemned"
2025	Out There	Television	Ersin Turuk	2 episodes
2025	Virdee	Television	Jonathan Boardman	3 episodes
2026	Dragon Striker	Television	Surya Sunspear (voice)	Recurring
