= Gabriel Woolf =

British actor (born 1932)

- Born: 2 October 1932 (age 94); Hendon, London, Middlesex, England
- Occupation: Actor
- Years active: 1951–present
- Notable work: Radio plays; Doctor Who (1975, 2006, 2024)
- Spouse(s): Zara E. Green (div.) Felicity Lott (m. 1984; died 2026)
- Children: 3

Gabriel Woolf (born 2 October 1932) is a British stage, film, radio and television actor.

== Career ==
Woolf graduated from the Royal Academy of Dramatic Art in 1951 with a RADA Diploma. In the 1950s he worked in Stratford-upon-Avon in several Shakespeare plays, including Twelfth Night, Macbeth and Titus Andronicus with Laurence Olivier and Vivien Leigh, and at The Old Vic.

Among Woolf's leading parts was his performance as the Apostle John in a frequently repeated BBC adaptation of The Man Born to Be King where he also introduced each play. His film roles include Sir Percival in the 1953 film, Knights of the Round Table.

In 1975, he played Sutekh in the Doctor Who serial Pyramids of Mars. Woolf renewed his association with Doctor Who in 1981 by reading three novelisations of Doctor Who stories for the Royal National Institute of Blind People. The books were The Three Doctors, Doctor Who and the Carnival of Monsters and Doctor Who and the Loch Ness Monster, all written by Terrance Dicks. He joined up with the Doctor again by performing in the Big Finish Productions audio play Arrangements for War and its sequel, Thicker than Water. He appeared on the Pyramids of Mars DVD in a sketch called Oh Mummy: Sutekh's Story and a documentary piece titled Osiran Gothic.

In 2005, he returned to work with the writers of Oh Mummy, appearing in the Doctor Who DVD extra Eye On Blatchford as the demented Doctor Amadeus Gowel. In the Magic Bullet Faction Paradox audio plays Coming to Dust (2005), The Ship of a Billion Years (2006) and Body Politic (2008), all written by Lawrence Miles, Woolf reprises his role as Sutekh.

In 2008, Woolf played Witchfinder General Matthew Hopkins in the third story in the Scarifyers series, For King and Country. The play was broadcast on BBC7 in 2009.

In the 2006 series of Doctor Who, Woolf returned to provide the voice of "The Beast" in the two-part story "The Impossible Planet" and "The Satan Pit". Eighteen years later, he reprised the role of Sutekh in the Series 14 two-part series finale "The Legend of Ruby Sunday" / "Empire of Death".

His involvement with classical music has included narration on disc (Ferdinand by Ridout) in the concert hall (for the Chelsea Opera Group's 1981 concert performance of Béatrice et Bénédict) and taking part as reader in recitals at the Wigmore Hall - among them the memorial concert for Gerald Moore with the Songmakers' Almanac in 1987, French song in 1988, a Heinrich Heine programme in May 1990, a Brahms centenary concert in 1997, and Cara Clarissima: the story of Clara Wieck and Robert Schumann in 1999.

His many parts on BBC Radio include Shakespeare's Romeo and Inspector Charles Parker in the dramatisations of the Lord Peter Wimsey mysteries. He was regular voice on Closedown and For Schools and Colleges. He also toured with the author Colin Dexter, performing readings to accompany Dexter's talks; the author stated that Woolf "was frequently said to be blessed with the finest speaking voice ever heard on the wireless".

Woolf is a Vice President of the Joyful Company of Singers.

Woolf has abridged and recorded all of Arthur Ransome's Swallows and Amazons series of children's books. He was also elected President of the Arthur Ransome Society.

== Personal life ==
He married opera singer Felicity Lott in 1984 and they have a daughter, Emily (b. 1984), and lived in Seaford and Paris.

He also has two children from his earlier marriage to Zara E Green.

== Filmography ==
=== Television ===
Year	Title	Role	Notes
1951	Tom Brown's Schooldays	Big Brooke	Uncredited
1951	The Boy with a Cart	Cuthman	TV movie
1953	Knights of the Round Table	Percival	
1961	Rob Roy	Rashleigh Osbaldistone	5 episodes
1961	Emergency Ward 10	Robert Emery	20 episodes
1964	Nothing but the Best	Man	Uncredited
1968–1969	Market in Honey Lane	Gervase Lorrimer	8 episodes
1971–1980	The Boy From Space	Peep-Peep's Father	Episodes 7-10
1972	The Brothers	Priest	Episode: End of the Beginning
1975	Doctor Who	Sutekh	4 episodes; Pyramids of Mars
1984	The Prisoner of Zenda	Cardinal-Archbishop of Strelsau	Miniseries
2004	Oh Mummy: Sutekh's Story	Sutekh (voice)	Short
2006	Doctor Who	The Beast (voice)	Episodes: "The Impossible Planet" / "The Satan Pit"
2012–2013	Wizards vs. Aliens	The Stones (voice)	2 episodes
2015	Transmission from Mars	Sutekh (voice)	Short
2024	Doctor Who	Sutekh (voice)	Episodes: "The Legend of Ruby Sunday" / "Empire of Death"

=== Audio ===
Year	Title	Role	Notes
2004	Doctor Who: Arrangements for War	Justice Rossiter	
2005	Doctor Who: Thicker than Water	Justice Rossiter	
2005–2009	The True History of Faction Paradox	Sutekh	5 episodes
2015	Bernice Summerfield: The Triumph of Sutekh	Sutekh	4 episodes
2018	Doctor Who: The Fourth Doctor Adventures	Sutekh	2 episodes
