= Will Thorp =

British actor

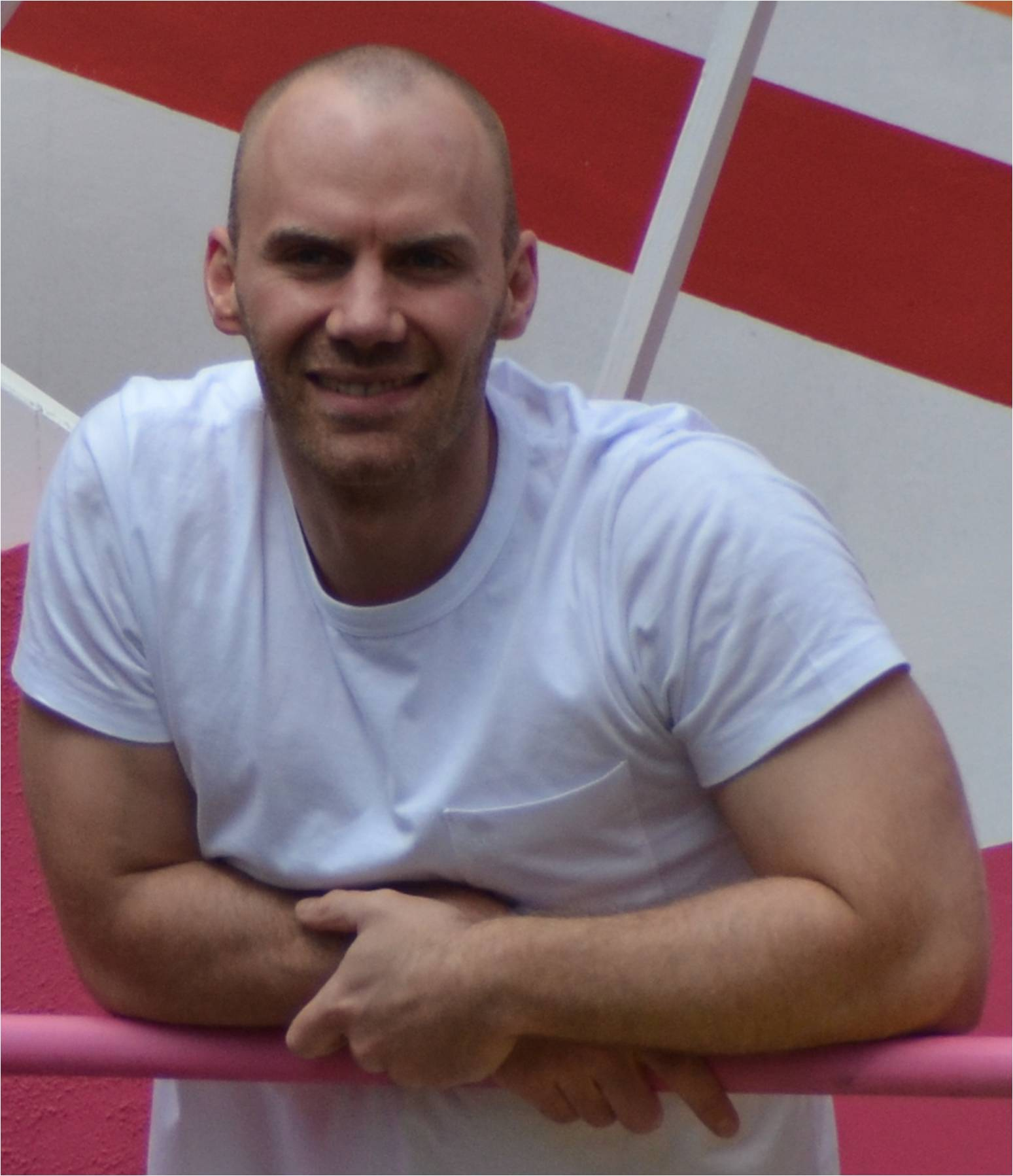
- Born: William Francis Thorp; 21 June 1977 (age 48); Frome, Somerset, England
- Occupation: Actor
- Years active: 2003–present

William Francis Thorp (born 21 June 1977) is an English actor.

== Early life ==
Thorp attended St Augustine's Catholic College in Trowbridge. He studied at Bath College and joined Musical Youth Theatre Company. Thorp was also a member of the National Youth Theatre for six years before training at the Bristol Old Vic Theatre School for three years.

== Career ==
Television credits includes; Stephen Poliakoff's "Friends and Crocodiles", Courtroom, Paul "Woody" Joiner in Casualty, Toby Zed in the 2006 series of Doctor Who in the episodes "The Impossible Planet" and "The Satan Pit". 2008, 'Hughie Green, Most Sincerely', Law and Order: UK, and in 2009 Thorp was cast as Chris Gray in Coronation Street. Other appearances include Scott & Bailey, Doctors, In The Club and "Unhallowed Ground" and Cornelius the Centurion in NBC's "A.D. The Bible Continues". Theatre credits include: "Home Delivery" New Vic Basement, "Cork and Spark" New Vic Studio, "The Lost Dragon" Chester Gateway Theatre, "High Society" UK Tour, Don John and Dogberry in Much Ado About Nothing (2004), Teddy in Robbers and Sam (Sambo) in Fire Down Under! in 2002, In 2006 Thorp played the leading role in a national UK tour of the play Strangers on a Train. In 2008 he played the leading role in David Hare's play The Blue Room which opened at the Haymarket Theatre, Basingstoke. 2013 "Love and Money (play)" UK Tour. In 2005, he appeared on the third series of the BBC's Strictly Come Dancing, reaching seventh place with his partner Hanna Haarala. He guest-starred in the Doctor Who audio play 100.

He has narrated a series of Doctor Who novels; Forever Autumn, Sick Building, Peacemaker and The Krillitane Storm, all produced by BBC Audiobooks. Other audiobooks read by Thorp include The Knife That Killed Me, Hyperpsychoreality Syndrome, Baboon, Buy-ology, The Kill Call, Click, Who Runs Britain? and The Spook's Curse, "The David Bowie Treasures", "Inverting the Pyramid", "Anatomy of England" and "The Dynamite Room".

== Credits ==
Year	Title	Role	Note
2003	Boys Will Be Boys	Mark	
2004–2005	Casualty	Paul "Woody" Joiner	48 episodes
2004	The Courtroom	PC David Wills	1 episode
2005	Holby City	Woody Joiner	1 episode
2005	Friends and Crocodiles	Soup Man 2	
2005	Jodie		
2006	Doctor Who	Toby Zed	2 episodes: "The Impossible Planet"; "The Satan Pit"
2008	Hughie Green, Most Sincerely	TV Executive	
2009	Law & Order: UK	Joe Buttler	Series 2, episode 3
2010–2011	Coronation Street	Chris Gray	108 episodes
2012	Scott & Bailey	DS Miller	Series 2, episode 8
2013	Doctors	Matt Davis	
2014	In The Club	Ross Jackson	
2015	Unhallowed Ground		
2015	A.D. The Bible Continues	Cornelius	
2018	Shakespeare & Hathaway	Anton Dukes	Series 1, episode 4
2021–2023	All Creatures Great and Small	Gerald Hammond	13 episodes
