= Danny Webb (British actor) =

British actor (born 1958)

- Born: 6 June 1958 (age 68); London, England
- Occupation: Actor
- Years active: 1979–present
- Spouse: Leila Bertrand
- Children: 2

Danny Webb (born 6 June 1958) is an English television and film actor. His roles include the prisoner Morse in the movie Alien 3, Thomas Cromwell in Henry VIII, John Maynard Jefferson in the two part Doctor Who story "The Impossible Planet" and "The Satan Pit" in 2006, and Ser Arlan of Pennytree in A Knight of the Seven Kingdoms in 2026.

== Early life and education ==
Webb was born on 6 June 1958 to Eileen and Maurice Webb. He attended the Royal Academy of Dramatic Art and graduated in 1977.

== Career ==
=== Film and television ===
Webb has appeared in many British television programmes, including The Young Indiana Jones Chronicles, Our Friends in the North, A Touch of Frost, Agatha Christie's Poirot, The Bill, Midsomer Murders, Silent Witness and Shackleton. He also appeared in two episodes of Doctor Who – "The Impossible Planet" and "The Satan Pit". He has also appeared in Britannia High as Jack Tyler and in New Tricks as a DJ.

In 1985, Webb appeared alongside Jon Pertwee in a television adaptation of Karl Wittlinger's Broadway play, Do You Know the Milky Way? playing Kris, a psychiatric patient who believed that he came from another star. Webb has also had recurring roles in several television series, including Brookside, Cardiac Arrest and Life Begins.

In 2008, Webb appeared as the journalist Noel Botham in the BBC Four drama Hughie Green, Most Sincerely, as well as narrating the Games Workshop Black Library audiobook The Lightning Tower/The Dark King and the Gotrek and Felix audiobook Slayer of the Storm God. He also had a small part as a German communications officer in the film Valkyrie starring Tom Cruise. In September 2009, he had a lead role in the BBC1 five-part drama series Land Girls, playing a sergeant in the Home Guard.

In 2015, Danny completed the role of Roy in the British crime thriller The Contract which was released in January 2016. In August 2024, it was announced that Webb had been cast as Ser Arlan of Pennytree in the upcoming series A Knight of the Seven Kingdoms. The series premiered in 2026.

=== Theatre ===
Webb has worked extensively in theatre, including in the Olivier Award-winning production of Blasted by Sarah Kane at the Lyric Theatre, a production he received the 2011 Offie for Best Actor. He has appeared twice at the Royal Court Theatre, in Chicken Soup with Barley by Arnold Wesker (2011) and The Mistress Contract. In 2022, he appeared as Al Smith in Straight Line Crazy in London and Off-Broadway.

=== Music videos ===
Webb plays the protagonist in all three versions of Yes's 1983 video for "Owner of a Lonely Heart".

== Films ==
Year	Title	Character	Production	Ref.
1984	A Year of the Quiet Sun	David		
1985	No End	Englishman		
1986	Defence of the Realm	Danny Royce	Hemdale Film Corporation	
1987	Billy the Kid and the Green Baize Vampire	TV Director		
1987	Death Wish 4: The Crackdown	Zacharias' Man	Cannon Films	
1989	Henry V	Gower	BBC	
1991	Robin Hood	Much the Miller	20th Century Fox / Working Title	
1992	Alien 3	Robert Morse	20th Century Fox	
1996	True Blue	Alan Palmer	FilmFour Productions	
1997	Love and Death on Long Island	Video Assistant	Telefilm Canada	
1998	Still Crazy	Clive	Columbia Pictures Corporation	
2000	Shiner	Karl	Miramax Films	
2001	Inspiration	Man		
2003	I'll Be There	Denny Wise	Morgan Creek	
2004	The Aryan Couple	Himmler		
2005	The Upside of Anger	Grey Wolfmeyer	Media 8 Entertainment	
2006	Attack Force	Werner		
2008	Valkyrie	Captain Haans	United Artists	
2010	The Story of F***	Barton Hamborski		
2013	Hummingbird	Damon	Lionsgate	
2014	Locke	Cassidy	A24	
2014	A Little Chaos	Claude Moulin	BBC Films	
2015	The Contract	Roy	Scanner Rhodes Production / Robert Fucilla Company	
2015	Silent Hours	David Frampton		
2016	City of Tiny Lights	DS Cal Donnely	BBC Films	
2017	Pegasus Bridge	General Richard Gale	Independent	
2017	Churchill	General Alan Brooke	Salon Pictures	
2019	Never Grow Old	Preacher Pike	Saban Films	

== Television ==
Year	Title	Character	Production	Notes	Ref.
1979	The Dick Francis Thriller: The Racing Game	Peter	ITV	Episode: "Trackdown"	
1980	BBC Television Shakespeare	Servant	BBC	Episode: Twelfth Night	
1980	Jackanory Playhouse	Harold	BBC	Episode: "The Silver Fish"	
1980	Mackenzie	Builder's Merchant	BBC	Episode: "Preliminary Enquiries"	
1980	Play for Today	Police Constable/Despatch Rider	BBC	2 episodes, including The Imitation Game	
1982	We'll Meet Again	Young Recruit	ITV	Episode: "Old Enough to Fight"	
1982	The Unapproachable	Marek	ORF	TV film	
1982–1983	Brookside	Gavin Taylor	Channel 4	15 episodes	
1984	More Lives Than One	Steve	BBC	TV film	
1985	Do You Know the Milkyway?	Kris		TV film	
1986	Slip-Up	Monk & McCabe	BBC	TV film	
1987	Intimate Contact	Scott		TV film	
1988	The Comic Strip Presents...	Party Guest	Channel 4	Episode: "Didn't You Kill My Brother?"	
1988	Bergerac	Joe Grantham	BBC	Episode: "Retirement Plan"	
1989	Agatha Christie's Poirot	Porter	ITV	Episode: "The Adventure of the Clapham Cook"	
1989	The Saint: The Brazilian Connection	Steven	Celtic Film Entertainment	TV film	
1989	Boon	Mike Hawkins	ITV	2 episodes	
1989	The Bill	Steve Hill	ITV	Episode: "Fools Gold"	
1990	Screen Two	Actor	BBC	Episode: "Drowning in the Shallow Ends"	
1990	Made in Heaven	Dave	Granada	Episode: "Falling in Love"	
1991	ScreenPlay	Det. Con. Hoad	BBC	Episode: "Clubland"	
1992	The Jazz Detective	Bernie Weston			
1992	Bookmark	Dick Hughes	BBC	Episode: "Sunny Stories"	
1992–1993	The Young Indiana Jones Chronicles	Pablo Picasso	ABC	2 episodes	
1993	A Woman's Guide to Adultery	Ray	Carlton Television		
1993	Comics	Brian Duffield	Channel 4		
1994	The Bill	Steven Petit	ITV	Episode: "Big Eagle Day"	
1994	Headhunters	Roger Garrison	BBC		
1994	99-1	McCarthy	ITV	2 episodes	
1994	Cardiac Arrest	Mr Simon Bentancourt	BBC	Series 1	
1995	Space Precinct	Wyndam 'Houdini' Derrit	Sky One	Episode: "Two Against the Rock"	
1995	Mrs. Hartley and the Growth Centre	Vicar			
1996	Our Friends in the North	Detective Inspector Ron Conrad	BBC	4 episodes	
1996	Murder Most Horrid	Tony Smedley	Talkback Productions	Episode: "Dead on Time"	
1996	The Bill	Grigori Minescu	ITV	Episode: "Black Money"	
1996	Sharman	Durban	ITV	Episode: ""A Good Year For The Roses"	
1996	A Touch of Frost	Karl Edwards	ITV	Episode: "Paying the Price"	
1997	Dressing for Breakfast	John	Channel 4	Episode: "Married Man"	
1997	A Perfect State	Johnny	BBC		
1998	The King of Chaos	Liam Keller	Stone City Films	TV film	
1998	Terror in the Mall	Warden Banks	Warner Bros Television	TV film	
1998	2point4 Children	Malcolm	BBC	Episode: "Malcolm X"	
1998	The Bill	Sammy Lewis	ITV	Episode: "Three Cheers"	
1998	The Jump	Davey Jackson	ITV		
1998	Frenchman's Creek	William	Carlton Television	TV film	
1999	Harbour Lights	Vic Morley	BBC	Episode: "Muckraker"	
1999	Hunting Venus	John	ITV	TV film	
1999	Dalziel and Pascoe	Det. Chief Inspector Geoffrey Hiller	BBC	Episode: "Recalled to Life"	
1999	In the Name of Love	George Walters		TV film	
2000	The Scarlet Pimpernel	Libersac	BBC	Episode: "A Good Name"	
2000	The Knock	John Gilbraith	ITV	Episode: "Power Trip"	
2000	In the Beginning	Laban	NBC	TV film	
2000	Casualty	Harry Chapman	BBC	Episode: "Seize the Night"	
2001	Hawk	David	BBC	TV film	
2001	Take Me	Doug Patton	ITV		
2002	Shackleton	Perris	Channel 4	TV film	
2002	Outside the Rules	Dr. John Falkirk	BBC	TV film	
2002	Murder in Mind	Derek Stevensby	BBC	Episode: "Swan Song"	
2002	The Hound of the Baskervilles	Inspector Lestrade	BBC	TV film	
2003	Cutting It	Ivor Biltong	BBC	Episode: "Episode #2.4"	
2003	Henry VIII	Thomas Cromwell	ITV	TV film	
2003	Starhunter	Max	The Danforth Studios Ltd.	Episode: "Supermax Redux"	
2003	The Private Life of Samuel Pepys	Edward Montagu	BBC Films	TV film	
2004	Murder in Suburbia	Gavin Webb	ITV	Episode: "Applejacks"	
2004	Murder City	Eddie Gresham	Granada Television	Episode: "Mr Right"	
2004	Waking the Dead	Sir Martin Havering	BBC	Episode: "False Flag"	
2004	Silent Witness	Sergeant Paul Bradley	BBC	Episode: "Body 21"	
2004	My Family	Ches	BBC	Episode: "Glad Tidings We Bring"	
2004–2005	Life Begins	Paul	ITV	12 episodes	
2005	Uncle Adolf	Joseph Goebbels	ITV	TV film	
2005	A Touch of Frost	Father David Rose	ITV	Episode: "Near Death Experience"	
2005	Heartbeat	Vince Wain	ITV	Episode: "Blood Brothers"	
2006	The Bill	George Swanson	ITV	Episode: "444"	
2006	Hotel Babylon	Mr Matthews	BBC	Episode: "Episode 1"	
2006	Lewis	Tom Pollock	ITV	Episode: "Reputation"	
2006	Totally Frank	Jimmy	Channel 4	Episode: "Episode #2.4"	
2006	Nostradamus	Pierre		TV film	
2006	Doctor Who	Mr Jefferson	BBC	Episode: "The Impossible Planet/The Satan Pit"	
2006	The Inspector Lynley Mysteries	Eddie Price	BBC	Episode: "In the Blink of the Eye"	
2006	Midsomer Murders	Tony Kirby	ITV	Episode: "Dance with the Dead"	
2006	Ancient Rome: The Rise and Fall of an Empire	Licinius	BBC	Episode: "Constantine"	
2007	Agatha Christie's Marple	Mutti	ITV	Episode: "At Bertram's Hotel"	
2007	All About Me	Danny Caldwell	BBC	TV film	
2008	Lark Rise to Candleford	Dan Macey	BBC	Episode: "Episode 2"	
2008	The Bill	Ernie Rosen	ITV	Episode: "The Deadly Game"	
2008	Phoo Action	Lord Rothwell	BBC	TV film	
2008	Casualty	Rob Greyson	BBC	Episode: "The Mess We're In"	
2008	Honest	Mack Carter	ITV	Main cast	
2008	Hughie Green, Most Sincerely	Noel Botham		TV film	
2008	New Tricks	Graham Madeley	BBC	Episode: "A Face for Radio"	
2008	Britannia High	Jack Tyler	ITV	2 episodes	
2009	Hallmark Hall of Fame	Trojan		Episode: "The Courageous Heart of Irena Sendler"	
2009	The Bill	Matthew Devlin	ITV	6 episodes	
2009	Trinity	Crispin Hunter	ITV	Episode: "1.5"	
2009–2011	Land Girls	Sgt Dennis Tucker	BBC	Main cast	
2010	Hustle	Rex Kennedy	BBC	Episode: "Father of the Jewels"	
2010	Holby City	Kevin Dalton	BBC	Episode: "To Have and to Hold"	
2010	Midsomer Murders	Jeff Bowmaker	ITV	Episode: "The Silent Land"	
2011	Being Human	Marcus	BBC	Episode: "Daddy Ghoul"	
2011	Death in Paradise	Jon Taylor	BBC	Episode: "Amongst Us"	
2012, 2023	Endeavour	DS Arthur Lott	ITV	2 episodes	
2012	Sherlock	DI Carter	BBC	Episode: "A Scandal in Belgravia"	
2013	Agatha Christie's Poirot	Superintendent Bill Garroway	ITV	Episode: "Elephants Can Remember"	
2015–2016	Humans	Professor Edwin Hobb	Channel 4 & AMC	9 episodes	
2016, 2019	Plebs	Lepidus	Rise Films	2 episodes	
2017	Father Brown	Malcolm Pendle	BBC	Episode: "The Alchemist's Secret"	
2017	The Halcyon	MI5 agent	ITV	2 episodes	
2017–2020	Liar	DS Rory Maxwell	ITV	Main role, 12 episodes	
2018	The City And The City	Maj. Jorgi Syedr	BBC	Miniseries	
2019	Pennyworth	John Ripper	Epix	11 episodes	
2019–2020	The Trial of Christine Keeler	George Wigg, Baron Wigg	BBC	Miniseries	
2024	The Regime	Mr. Laskin	HBO	Miniseries	
2024	Beyond Paradise	Jaimie Martins	BBC One	1 episode	
2026	A Knight of the Seven Kingdoms	Ser Arlan of Pennytree	HBO	Recurring role; 5 episodes	
