= The Legend of Ruby Sunday =

311a – "The Legend of Ruby Sunday"
- Doctor Who episode
- Promotional title-card

Cast
- Doctor: Ncuti Gatwa – Fifteenth Doctor
- Companion: Millie Gibson – Ruby Sunday
- Others: Jemma Redgrave – Kate Lethbridge-Stewart; Yasmin Finney – Rose Noble; Alexander Devrient – Colonel Christofer Ibrahim; Lenny Rush – Morris Gibbons; Genesis Lynea – Harriet Arbinger; Aidan Cook – The Vlinx; Nicholas Briggs – Voice of the Vlinx; Susan Twist – Susan Triad; Fela Lufadeju – Bailey Sinclair; Bonnie Langford – Melanie Bush; Michelle Greenidge – Carla Sunday; Anita Dobson – Mrs Flood; Angela Wynter – Cherry Sunday; Tachia Newall – Colonel Winston Chidozie; Gabriel Woolf – Voice of Sutekh; Jasmine Bayes – Corporal Alice Sullivan

Production
- Directed by: Jamie Donoughue
- Written by: Russell T Davies
- Produced by: Vicki Delow
- Executive producers: Russell T Davies; Julie Gardner; Jane Tranter; Joel Collins; Phil Collinson
- Music by: Murray Gold
- Series: Series 14
- Running time: 1st of 2-part story, 44 minutes
- First broadcast: 15 June 2024

Chronology
← Preceded by "Rogue"	Followed by → "Empire of Death"

"The Legend of Ruby Sunday" is the seventh and penultimate episode of the fourteenth series of the British science fiction television series Doctor Who. It was simultaneously released on Disney+ in the United States on 14 June 2024 and on BBC iPlayer in the United Kingdom on 15 June. A BBC One broadcast followed later in the day. The episode is the first in a two-part story written by Russell T Davies and directed by Jamie Donoughue. The story was concluded with "Empire of Death", which was broadcast the following week on 22 June. The entire two-part story was also given a limited theatrical release.

In the episode, the Fifteenth Doctor (Ncuti Gatwa) and his companion, Ruby Sunday (Millie Gibson), seek help from UNIT, a team that handles alien threats on Earth, in determining the identity of the mysterious woman who has appeared in many of their adventures, as well as the identity of Ruby's mother. The episode also reintroduces the villain Sutekh, following his only previous television appearance in the 1975 serial Pyramids of Mars. It was filmed in July 2023 along with the following episode. And was watched by 3.79 million viewers.

== Plot ==
The Doctor arrives at the headquarters of UNIT and meets with Kate Lethbridge-Stewart and other members. UNIT identifies the mysterious woman who has appeared in the Doctor's previous adventures as Susan Triad, the head of S Triad Technology. The group realises "S Triad" is an anagram of "TARDIS", and believe it to be a trap. The Doctor additionally believes that Triad may be his granddaughter Susan Foreman. Ruby leaves with Rose Noble, who is the daughter of former companion Donna Noble and is now working for UNIT. They retrieve a VHS tape containing security footage from the night Ruby was abandoned. The Doctor and Ruby hope to identify Ruby's biological mother using UNIT's technology, after he was previously unable to see her face when he visited the night she was abandoned.

Ruby and Rose go to Ruby's apartment to get the tape. Ruby's adoptive mother Carla returns with them to the UNIT Headquarters, leaving Carla's mother, Cherry, with their neighbour Mrs Flood. After they leave, Mrs Flood suddenly treats Cherry with contempt and observes an incoming storm, stating "he waits no more". Ruby and Rose return to UNIT headquarters, where they use a "Time Window" in order to recreate the night Ruby was abandoned, entering it alongside UNIT colonel Chidozie. A hooded figure, believed to be Ruby's mother, points ambiguously at the Doctor, and as the figure disappears, a mysterious swirling vortex appears where Chidozie stood. After the Doctor, and Ruby, and Kate try to rescue Chidozie by asking him questions, the Window overloads, leaving behind Chidozie's withered remains.

The Doctor goes with former companion Mel to talk to Triad as she prepares for an international technology launch broadcast. The Doctor does not recognise Triad as his granddaughter, and realises that she experiences dreams of her other existences. UNIT view the vortex on the VHS tape and determine that the TARDIS was at the centre of the vortex. UNIT identifies a being surrounding the TARDIS as it begins to groan. Harriet Arbinger, a member of UNIT, is revealed to be an agent of The One Who Waits, who materialises around the TARDIS and reveals himself as Sutekh, the god of death and an old enemy of the Doctor. Triad breaks down over the memories of her dreams during the broadcast, before Sutekh possesses her and attempts to kill the Doctor.

== Production ==
=== Development ===
The episodes primary antagonist, Sutekh, is inspired by the Egyptian deity Set (pictured).

The episode was written by Doctor Who showrunner Russell T Davies. Davies said he first got a rough idea for the episode 40 to 50 years earlier. Davies gave a list of five previous stories that he suggested viewers watch before the episode released. The episode draws together many loose threads and previous story arcs. Some of these storylines also continued to explore plot threads surrounding the Timeless Child, which previous showrunner Chris Chibnall introduced during his era. Davies originally intended the episode to begin with a cold open at an American coffee bar in 1947. The episode had a working title of "Chrysalis".

The story re-introduces Sutekh to Doctor Who after his only previous televised appearance in the 1975 serial Pyramids of Mars, where he battled against the Fourth Doctor (Tom Baker). Sutekh is based on the Egyptian deity Set, which accords with Davies's goal of bringing more gods to the programme. He was also revealed to be "the one who waits", mentioned to the Doctor by the Toymaker in "The Giggle" (2023), and the leader of the Gods of Chaos, another member of which was encountered in "The Devil's Chord" (2024). It is the first episode in a two-part story, concluding in the following week's episode, "Empire of Death". The two episodes were bridged by an episode of Tales of the TARDIS, presenting Pyramids of Mars with updated special effects.

=== Filming ===
"The Legend of Ruby Sunday" was directed by Jamie Donoughue, who compared the two-part finale to a feature film. It was produced in the series's fifth production block, along with the following episode, from 5 June to 14 July 2023. To create the scene of the TARDIS crashing into the UNIT headquarters, a tennis ball was rolled down the aisle on the set to allow for interaction with the performers. The TARDIS was later added using visual effects.

Hoping to create a more realistic look in the time window scene, the production team opted not to use a green screen. Instead, a team returned to St Mary's Church in Nash, Newport, which was previously used as a location in "The Church on Ruby Road" (2023). Once there, they used lidar scanning to create a three-dimensional model of the church. After applying effects to the model in Unreal Engine, it was projected onto screens, erected on the Time Window set on Stage 6 at Wolf Studios Wales, and camera tracked.

Millennium FX designed the mask for Twist's character with the goal of accentuating her bone structure without suggesting the appearance of a zombie. Codenames were used while filming in public to keep the episodes' antagonists a secret. Some of the story was filmed at One Central Square in Cardiff in June 2023.

=== Casting ===
Numerous performers reprised their roles after appearing earlier in the fourteenth series and throughout the 2023 specials. Jemma Redgrave reprised her role as Kate Lethbridge-Stewart, while Bonnie Langford guest-starred as former Sixth and Seventh Doctor companion Mel Bush. Langford had returned to Doctor Who in "The Giggle" (2023) after a 36-year absence. Langford described her role in the episode as "camp as hell". Additionally, Yasmin Finney returned as Rose Noble, the daughter of former companion Donna Noble, following her introduction in "The Star Beast" (2023).

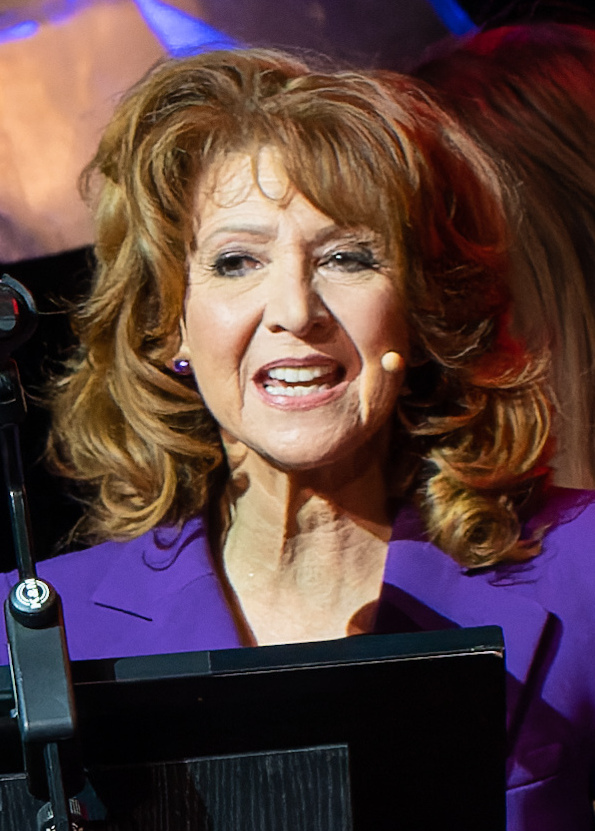
Bonnie Langford reprised her role as former companion Mel Bush.

Susan Twist made an appearance as Susan Triad, the head and founder of the fictional company S Triad Technology. Twist first appeared in "Wild Blue Yonder" and made a further appearance in "The Church on Ruby Road" before appearing in every episode of the fourteenth series as seemingly disparate characters. These roles were ultimately connected in the episode, with "S Triad" an anagram for "TARDIS" and "S Triad Technology" (as in Susan Triad Technology) being abbreviated to "Sue Tech", a homophone of "Sutekh". References to "Triad Technology" had been planted in Doctor Who as early as "The Giggle", where the company was mentioned in dialogue, as well as "The Church on Ruby Road", where a fictional advertisement appeared on a bus. Davies originally had three additional roles planned for Twist that would have featured in the episodes cold open. These included a nanny pushing a stroller in 1946 Pennsylvania, a blue-skinned extraterrestrial working in an alien diner as a waitress who would have served the Doctor and Ruby, and a "human astronaut addressing a colony of giant ants". The scene in Pennsylvania would have also featured physicist Albert Einstein and activist Paul Robeson.

Nicholas Briggs voices the Vlinx, an extremely intelligent living robot. Other returning cast members include Alexander Devrient, Michelle Greenidge, Anita Dobson, Angela Wynter, and Aidan Cook. Lenny Rush appeared in the episode as Morris Gibbons, a scientific advisor for UNIT. Rush was originally cast to voice the character Eric in the series opening episode, "Space Babies". However, the producers were impressed with his performance during the read-through and early days on set that they chose to recast him as Gibbons instead. Gabriel Woolf, at the age of 91, additionally appears as the voice of Sutekh, reprising his role from Pyramids of Mars. The remainder of the guest cast included Genesis Lynea, Fela Lufadeju, Tachia Newall, and Jasmine Bayes.

== Broadcast and reception ==
Professional ratings
Aggregate scores
Source	Rating
Rotten Tomatoes (Tomatometer)	93%
Rotten Tomatoes (Average Score)	7.2/10
Review scores
Source	Rating
Evening Standard	4/5 stars
The Daily Telegraph	2/5 stars
IGN	7/10
Total Film	4/5 stars

=== Broadcast ===
"The Legend of Ruby Sunday" was released on BBC iPlayer in the United Kingdom on 15 June 2024 and broadcast on BBC One later in the day. Disney handled distribution of the episode outside of the United Kingdom and Ireland, with it being released on Disney+ worldwide, simultaneously with the iPlayer release.

The episode was shown the following week in select cinemas in the United Kingdom alongside the series finale "Empire of Death".

=== Ratings ===
The episode brought in overnight viewing figures of 2.02 million viewers, slightly lower than that of the previous episode, "Rogue". The episode received a total of 3.79 million consolidated viewers across 7 days, and a total of 4.52 million consolidated viewers across 28 days.

=== Critical reception ===
On the review aggregator website Rotten Tomatoes, 93% of 14 critics' reviews are positive, with an average rating of 7.2/10.

Robert Anderson of IGN responded positively to the episode, praising the performance of Langford as Mel as well as the episode's tone, its presentation, and several of its scenes. He criticized the episode's cramped narrative and lack of character work between Ruby and the Doctor. Rebecca Cook of Digital Spy felt that the fantasy aspects of the episode worked well towards its narrative, believing that having Sutekh take the TARDIS allowed for the episode to become more menacing than it would have been otherwise. David Opie of GamesRadar+ praised the Time Window sequence and Langford's and Gatwa's performances together, though he felt the character of Ruby was underused in the episode. The New York Times author Isobel Lewis applauded Davies' writing and the programme's increased production value, stating that it was "such a bone-chilling adventure — one far scarier, far more ambitious, than I expected from the show’s Disney era."

Martin Belam of The Guardian felt that while the episode showed Gatwa's strengths as the Doctor, he felt the episode lacked many chilling moments along the way because of how the episode spent most of its time building to the climax. Stefan Mohamed of Den of Geek had a mixed response to the episode; while he believed the setup would be confusing to those unfamiliar with the show or uninvested in the characters, he felt the episode and plot "just about works" because of strong acting performances and major moments in the episode. Benji Wilson of The Daily Telegraph gave the episode two out of five, criticising the special effects of the "amorphous dust cloud" and the use of the supporting cast.

=== In print ===
A novelisation of this episode and "Empire of Death" under the title Empire of Death was written by Scott Handcock and is due to be released on 10 July 2025 as part of the Target Collection.
