= Matt Jones (writer) =

British television writer and producer (born 1968)

Matthew Jones
- Born: 5 August 1968 (age 58)
- Occupations: Screenwriter, television producer

Matthew David Jones (born 5 August 1968) is a British television screenwriter and television producer, who has worked on a variety of popular drama programmes for several television networks in the UK, including Shameless, Doctor Who and Dirk Gently.

== Early work ==
Matt Jones began his writing career as a columnist for Doctor Who Magazine in 1995, before the following year having a novel, Bad Therapy, printed in Virgin Publishing's range of licensed Doctor Who tie-in books, the New Adventures. He later wrote Beyond the Sun for the same series.

== Career ==
Jones' big break in television came in 1999, when he was the script editor on Red Production Company's controversial drama series Queer as Folk, screened on Channel 4. The same year, he script edited another Channel 4 drama produced by Red, the anthology series Love in the 21st Century, for which he also wrote one episode.

The following year he worked as a writer on two series for Granada Television, their children's drama Children's Ward and soap opera Coronation Street, both aired on the ITV network. Returning to Red, in 2000 he script edited the first series of Clocking Off, and in 2001 he gained his first credit as a producer when he both wrote and produced the one-off drama Now You See Her, starring Amanda Holden, for the satellite channel Sky One.

In 2003 he began working for Company Pictures, creating, writing and producing the crime drama Serious and Organised, starring Martin Kemp and again screened on ITV. Moving up to become an Executive Producer, he worked on another Company series for ITV, the Second World War-set POW. In 2004 he was an Executive Producer on Company's drama series Shameless, screened on Channel 4, and became the show's producer for the second season in 2005.

In April 2005, Jones was announced as one of the writers working on the second season of the BBC revival of the science-fiction series Doctor Who, fulfilling a childhood ambition to work on the programme. His episodes, a two-parter with the titles "The Impossible Planet" and "The Satan Pit", were broadcast on 3 and 10 June 2006. Jones also wrote the seventh episode of the second series of Doctor Who spin-off series Torchwood, called "Dead Man Walking".

In 2012, Jones wrote the second episode of the BBC Four TV series Dirk Gently based on the novels by Douglas Adams. In 2017, he wrote episodes of Stan Lee's Lucky Man. In 2020, he worked on Abi Morgan's legal drama The Split. More recently, Jones wrote on World on Fire and Joan.
