= Hanna Haarala =

Finnish dancer

Hanna Haarala (born in Finland) is a professional Latin American dancer. She has represented Finland with Mikko Kaasalainen at the European and World Games. Her current professional partner is Andrew Cuerden. She competed in series 3 of the BBC's successful dance show Strictly Come Dancing in 2005, reaching seventh place with actor Will Thorp.

== Strictly Come Dancing performances ==
Series	Partner	Place	Average
3	Will Thorp	7th	26.2

=== Performances with Will Thorp ===
Week	Dance & song	Judges' score				Total	Result
Week	Dance & song	Horwood	Phillips	Goodman	Tonioli	Total	Result
1	Cha-cha-cha / "Crazy Chick"	3	3	7	5	18	Bottom two
2	Quickstep / "You Can't Hurry Love"	7	7	8	7	29	Safe
3	Jive / "Man! I Feel Like a Woman!"	6	5	7	7	25	Bottom two
4	Foxtrot / "Dream a Little Dream of Me"	8	8	9	9	34	Safe
5	Viennese waltz / "Somebody to Love"	4	6	6	7	23	Bottom two
6	Tango / "Pretty Woman"	6	6	9	7	28	Eliminated
