= The Satan Pit =

174b – "The Satan Pit"
- Doctor Who episode

Cast
- Doctor: David Tennant – Tenth Doctor
- Companion: Billie Piper – Rose Tyler
- Others: Danny Webb – Mr. Jefferson; Shaun Parkes – Zachary Cross Flane; Claire Rushbrook – Ida Scott; Will Thorp – Toby Zed; Ronny Jhutti – Danny Bartock; Paul Kasey – The Ood; Gabriel Woolf – Voice of the Beast; Silas Carson – Voice of the Ood

Production
- Directed by: James Strong
- Written by: Matt Jones
- Produced by: Phil Collinson
- Executive producers: Russell T Davies; Julie Gardner
- Music by: Murray Gold
- Production code: 2.9
- Series: Series 2
- Running time: 2nd of 2-part story, 45 minutes
- First broadcast: 10 June 2006

Chronology
| ← Preceded by "The Impossible Planet" | Followed by → "Love & Monsters" |

"The Satan Pit" is the ninth episode of the second series of the British science fiction television series Doctor Who, which was first broadcast on 10 June 2006. It is the second part of a two-part story. The first part, "The Impossible Planet", was broadcast on 3 June.

The episode is set on Krop Tor, a planet orbiting a black hole. In the episode, the Tenth Doctor (David Tennant) climbs down a deep pit in which the Beast (Gabriel Woolf) is kept prisoner. At the same time, the Doctor's travelling companion Rose Tyler (Billie Piper) and a human expedition team try to escape the planet after the Beast possesses the Ood on the base.

== Plot ==
The Tenth Doctor and science officer Ida investigate a pit under a recently opened trap door deep in the planet Krop Tor. In the sanctuary base, Rose and three members of the crew, Jefferson, Danny, and Toby, flee from the advancing Ood, who are possessed by the Beast. Toby appears to be no longer possessed. As the Doctor and Ida prepare to return to the base, the Beast communicates with the Doctor and the rest of the crew through the Ood and explains that he was sealed in the pit before the universe began. The Beast demoralises the Doctor, Rose, and the crew, telling them that they will die. The lift cable snaps shortly after, trapping Ida and the Doctor ten miles underground with limited air.

With base commander Zach cornered in the control room by Ood, Rose and the rest of the crew are forced into a maintenance tunnel. Jefferson sacrifices his life to save the crew. Rose, Danny, and Toby go on to incapacitate the Ood by disrupting the telepathic field that keeps them functioning. After the group reunites with Zach, Zach knocks out the unwilling Rose and takes her with them to board the escape rocket and leave the planet.

Meanwhile, the Doctor and Ida use the lift cable to explore the pit, although the Doctor finds nothing but darkness far below. He then chooses to detach himself and fall, landing at the bottom thanks to an air cushion, and finds that he can breathe. The Doctor finds the physical form of the Beast. He quickly deduces from the unintelligible grunts coming from the Beast that its consciousness has already escaped and that Krop Tor was designed as the perfect prison for the Beast: its jailers devised two nearby jars as a failsafe, since their destruction would cause the planet to plunge into the black hole. The Doctor smashes the jars anyway to destroy the Beast. As the planet falls out of orbit, the Doctor stumbles across his TARDIS.

The rocket is also pulled towards the black hole, and Toby reveals he is still possessed. Rose takes Zach's bolt gun and shoots out the rocket's front window, unhooking Toby's safety harness to jettison him into space. Only having time for one trip, the Doctor rescues Ida just as her air supply runs out and tows the rocket to safety with the TARDIS.

== Production ==
Russell T Davies said that in order to inspire the design of the Beast, he sent the visual designers at The Mill images of paintings by Simon Bisley, a comics artist known for muscular grotesqueries. In the episode commentary, Davies said that an early draft of the script called for the role of the Ood to be filled by the same species as the Slitheen. Their race would have been enslaved and they wished to awaken the Beast, whom they believed to be a god that could free them. Davies claims credit for naming the Ood as a play on the word "odd".

According to the DVD commentary, the final scene in the TARDIS where the Doctor says "the stuff of legend" was the last major scene shot for Series 2, on March 31, 2006, and the last to feature Billie Piper (whose actual final episode had been filmed on January 16). It was not, however, the last scene filmed for the season, which was the "cliffhanger" scene at the very end of "Doomsday", filmed during the wrap party on March 31.

Davies also mentioned that one of many unused ideas for a creature in this episode would be used in series three; this turned out to be the Toclafane from "The Sound of Drums"/"Last of the Time Lords", as revealed via Davies's comments in Doctor Who Magazine Series Three Companion.

== Broadcast and home media ==
This episode was shown the Saturday after 6/6/06, with the first part airing the Saturday before, hence it bookended a week full of Devil-related stories in the media. Overnight ratings for "The Satan Pit" came in at 5.5 million viewers. This could be explained by the unusually hot country-wide weather, combined with the first England game of the 2006 World Cup. "The Satan Pit" had an audience share of 35%, meaning that its overall share has remained static and it was the third-most-watched programme of the day, after the World Cup game and Casualty. The final consolidated rating was 6.08 million, the lowest of any episode of Doctor Who since the show was revived in 2005. The audience Appreciation Index for the episode was 86.

This episode and "The Impossible Planet" were released in the UK, together with "Love & Monsters", as a basic DVD with no special features on 7 August 2006. It was re-released as part of the Complete Series 2 box set on 20 November 2006 with a commentary by James Strong, Mike Jones and Ranny Jhutti.

This episode and "The Impossible Planet" was edited into a movie-length cinematic cut including previously-deleted scenes and unseen rushes to mark Doctor Who's 63rd anniversary and it premiered in cinemas around the world on 23 November 2026. Due to popular demand, a second showing was later added for 28 November 2026. Brand manager for the Whoniverse James Page teased in a Radio Times interview for further cinematic releases, saying that this cinema showing, as well as the double-feature screenings for both of Ncuti Gatwa's finales as the Fifteenth Doctor, had demonstrated such high interest.

== Critical reception ==
IGN's Ahsan Haque gave "The Satan Pit" a score of 8.7 out of 10. He was generally positive and praised the CGI that animated the Beast, though he noted that the Doctor made some "logical leaps". Dave Golder of SFX felt that the ambition of the story could not live up to production values, but he praised Tennant and Piper. While he found some "scripting misfires" like the easy recovery of the TARDIS, he described the story as "action-packed, ambitious, emotionally draining and, thankfully, still willfully different to every other SF show out there." Arnold T Blumburg of Now Playing was more critical, giving "The Satan Pit" a grade of C+. He found it a disappointing conclusion which spent too much time getting the Doctor to the monster, only for him to confront it by "ranting and raving rather embarrassingly at a roaring CGI effect." He also criticised the Doctor's concentration on saving Rose without mentioning the other characters, and noted that a few previously unseen crew members appeared and that "entire plot threads also go nowhere". Still, he praised the acting of the guest cast, the music, and the effects, concluding that the two-parter was "a qualified success that offers solid character, brilliant visual design and some thought-provoking moments damaged only by poor plotting and some glaring missed opportunities".

== In print ==
The Satan Pit
- Author: Matt Jones
- Series: Doctor Who book: Target novelisations
- Publisher: BBC Books
- Publication date: 26 March 2026
- ISBN: 978-1785949968

A novelisation of this episode and "The Impossible Planet" written by Matt Jones was released as a paperback, ebook, and an audiobook on 26 March 2026 under the title The Satan Pit as part of the Target Collection.
