= List of Doctor Who universe creatures and aliens =

The Doctor Who logo that has been used from 2022 onwards

Doctor Who, a long-running British science fiction television series, has many creatures and aliens that exist in its fictional universe. Beginning in 1963, the show ran until 1989, at which point it was cancelled. It was later revived in 2005. The series stars its protagonist, the Doctor, an alien who travels through time and space in a ship known as the TARDIS, as well as their travelling companions, as they explore the universe. When the Doctor dies, they are able to undergo a process known as "regeneration", completely changing the Doctor's appearance and personality. Throughout their travels, the Doctor often comes into conflict with various creatures and alien species, with many of them serving as both supporting characters and as antagonists. These creatures are often dubbed "monsters" by fans of the series. This list covers alien races and other fictional creatures from the show's universe, as well as from several of its spin-off series, such as The Sarah Jane Adventures, Torchwood, and Class, in chronological order of their first appearance.

Initially an educational show, the introduction of the Daleks in the show's second story saw Doctor Who gain a ratings spike. More monsters were made to attempt to capitalise off the Daleks' success and subsequently became a larger focus within the series, notably during the period where Patrick Troughton acted as the Second Doctor. Monsters subsequently became incorporated throughout the rest of the show's original run, with concepts and premises for them being inspired by the setting and atmosphere of the current era of the show. Following the show's cancellation in 1989 and its subsequent revival in 2005, monsters once again became a major part of the show, with many returning from its original run.

The initial usage of monsters in the show's original run has been cited by critics as lacking in significant depth, with many monsters described as pure evil "Others" that sought to represent British cultural anxieties. However, as the series has progressed, critics have noted that monsters gained an increased level of character depth that allowed them to be portrayed more sympathetically.

== Conception and design ==
During the course of the series, the Doctor encounters many creatures, including alien species, with many of them acting as antagonists. These creatures are often dubbed "monsters" by fans of the series. Author Graham Sleight, in the book The Doctor's Monsters: Meanings of the Monstrous in Doctor Who defines a monster in the context of the show as "a creature of nonhuman appearance that acts in a way that's evil, or at least meant to harm the protagonist and other characters we're meant to be sympathetic with". Despite this, there are many alien species that do not act in an antagonistic manner; one example are the Draconians from the 1973 serial Frontier in Space, who have a distinctive non-human appearance yet are not inherently evil. Races such as these may still be categorised as a "monsters", however. Monsters are often adapted into spin-off media for the series, such as books, audio dramas, and comics, which often expand upon the creatures' backstories and abilities, though these stories often conflict with television series canon. Some monsters, such as the Voord, a mysterious race of black-suited creatures, have entire mythos constructed within spin-off media.

=== Classic series ===
Doctor Who was originally conceived as an educational show, with the series' format being planned so that it would involve the Doctor going back in time and experiencing important historical events. Early on in the series, however, the production team had no stories ready to be made, which resulted in The Daleks (1963-1964) being put into production. The serial featured the titular alien species, and its inclusion in the series was justified under the show's educational banner as being used to educate about nuclear war and its consequences to children. The Head of Drama at the BBC, Sydney Newman, initially disliked the idea of the Daleks, believing that Doctor Who should have no aliens or monsters. The Daleks, however, were highly popular with audiences, ensuring their return in subsequent stories. As the series' first few seasons progressed, the show's purely historical stories were phased out, being replaced by a format of visiting alien worlds and meeting alien species. Additionally, the Daleks' success led to many attempts at re-creating this popularity with monsters such as the Mechonoids and Voord, though these attempts were largely unsuccessful.

A number of monsters as pictured alongside the Second Doctor (Patrick Troughton) in a behind the scenes photograph from The War Games (1969). From left to right, back to front: a Yeti, Ice Warrior, Dalek, Cyberman, and Quark

Patrick Troughton's first season on the show as the Second Doctor saw a time of change for the series. The Daleks were expanded upon as antagonists, while the Cybermen, who had debuted in 1966's The Tenth Planet, became recurring antagonists following their debut appearance. The Daleks, whom Terry Nation, their creator, was trying to pitch as part of a television series in America, were written out of the series in 1967's The Evil of the Daleks, resulting in the introduction of several new recurring monsters to fill the gap left in the programme by the Daleks' absence. Troughton's second season saw an expansion of the show's monsters. By this point, the Cybermen were established as one of the series' main antagonists; the Ice Warriors and Yeti similarly were established during this season, becoming major recurring antagonists.

Initially, the show featured very few major invasions of contemporary Earth, but several serials during Troughton's time on the show began to experiment with this format. The success of the Troughton-era invasion serials, as well as a desire to reinvent the show, led to the era of Jon Pertwee's Third Doctor featuring many invasions of Earth. This format had limitations, however, with many of these invasion plots being similar in concept to those of the Quatermass series. Other serials, however, such as the 1970 serial Doctor Who and the Silurians, which introduced the titular monsters as recurring antagonists, focused on more scientific concepts and were more inventive in concept than a "standard" alien invasion story; for example, the Silurians had sympathetic motivations and were not traditional alien invaders, coming from the Earth instead of from space. Creatures with a mostly silver or black and white-based colour scheme, most notably the Cybermen, were phased out as antagonists, with newer antagonists being more colourful and "organic"; this was due to the series swapping to colour television, allowing the latter type of monster to be better realised on-screen. The production team eventually found these invasion stories thematically shallow and overly long, with each serial initially lasting seven episodes each. While the episode counts were decreased to address the length issue, the alien invasion stories were retained and increased in prominence in the show's eighth season. The season's opening serial, 1971's Terror of the Autons, was considered so terrifying by viewers and critics alike as a result of its titular monster that the production team decided to bring back adventures set in outer space, which had previously been avoided in Pertwee's era. The Daleks were also brought back as recurring antagonists.

The first season of actor Tom Baker's era as the Fourth Doctor saw the return of many old antagonists, such as the Daleks, Cybermen, and Sontarans. The production team aimed to make the show more sophisticated, re-vamping the series and giving stories greater depth; this re-invention extended to their returning antagonists. James Chapman stated in the book Inside the TARDIS: The Worlds of Doctor Who that this season served as a reinvention of the series' past while simultaneously shifting away from it, as subsequent seasons saw fewer returning antagonists. Producer Philip Hinchcliffe wanted the show to move away from the alien invasion stories on Earth that had been present in Pertwee's era, wanting a shift to cosmic threats with less absolute goals. Following this season, the show shifted to explorations of deep space, away from Earth-based settings, with many of the new alien creatures, such as the Krynoids and Zygons, being firmly grounded within the genre of horror in their origins. This period of the show was described as "gothic", and featured "oppressive" and "claustrophobic" alien planet designs, and any familiar Earth locations were given darker touches. Monster based horror stories were largely abandoned by the time of the show's sixteenth season, with the stories becoming more comedic instead. This season, dubbed "The Key to Time", largely dropped them due to the "unique" nature of the season.

Led under the tenure of producer John Nathan-Turner, actor Peter Davison's time as the Fifth Doctor saw a shift away from the comedic focus, with the show's twentieth series, its anniversary series, beginning a period of the show bringing back many antagonists from its past. The show's twenty-first series saw further returns of multiple monsters, including the Daleks, Silurians, and Sea Devils. Colin Baker's time as the Sixth Doctor saw the returns of many previously appearing monsters, including the Cybermen and Sontarans. Many of these monster returns in the later years of the show's Classic era were directly tied to prior appearances, with many being direct sequels to prior stories. This was done due to the production team believing fans wanted to see more ties back to the series' past, but contemporary reviews disliked these returns, which alienated fans more than it appealed to them.

=== Revived series ===
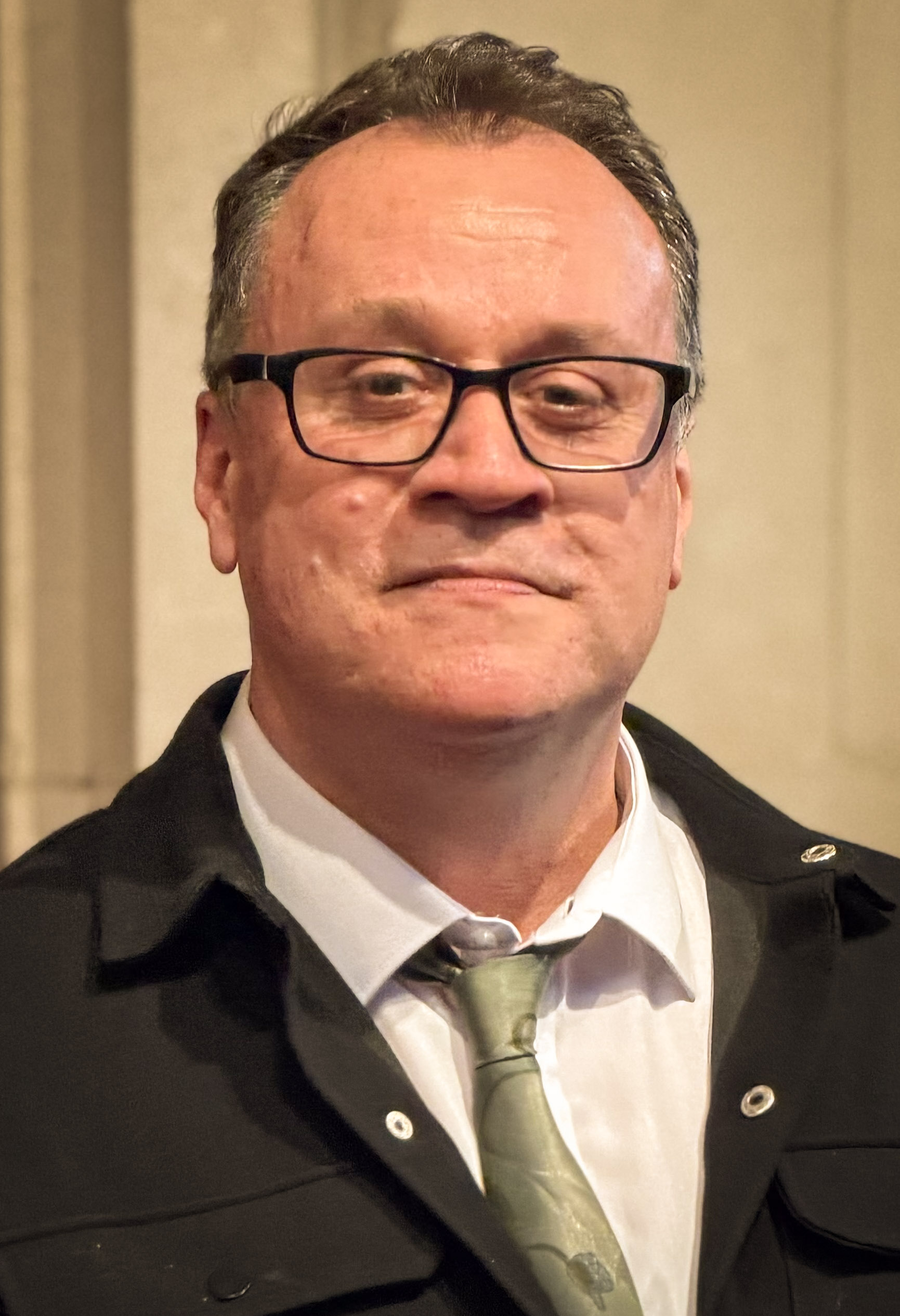
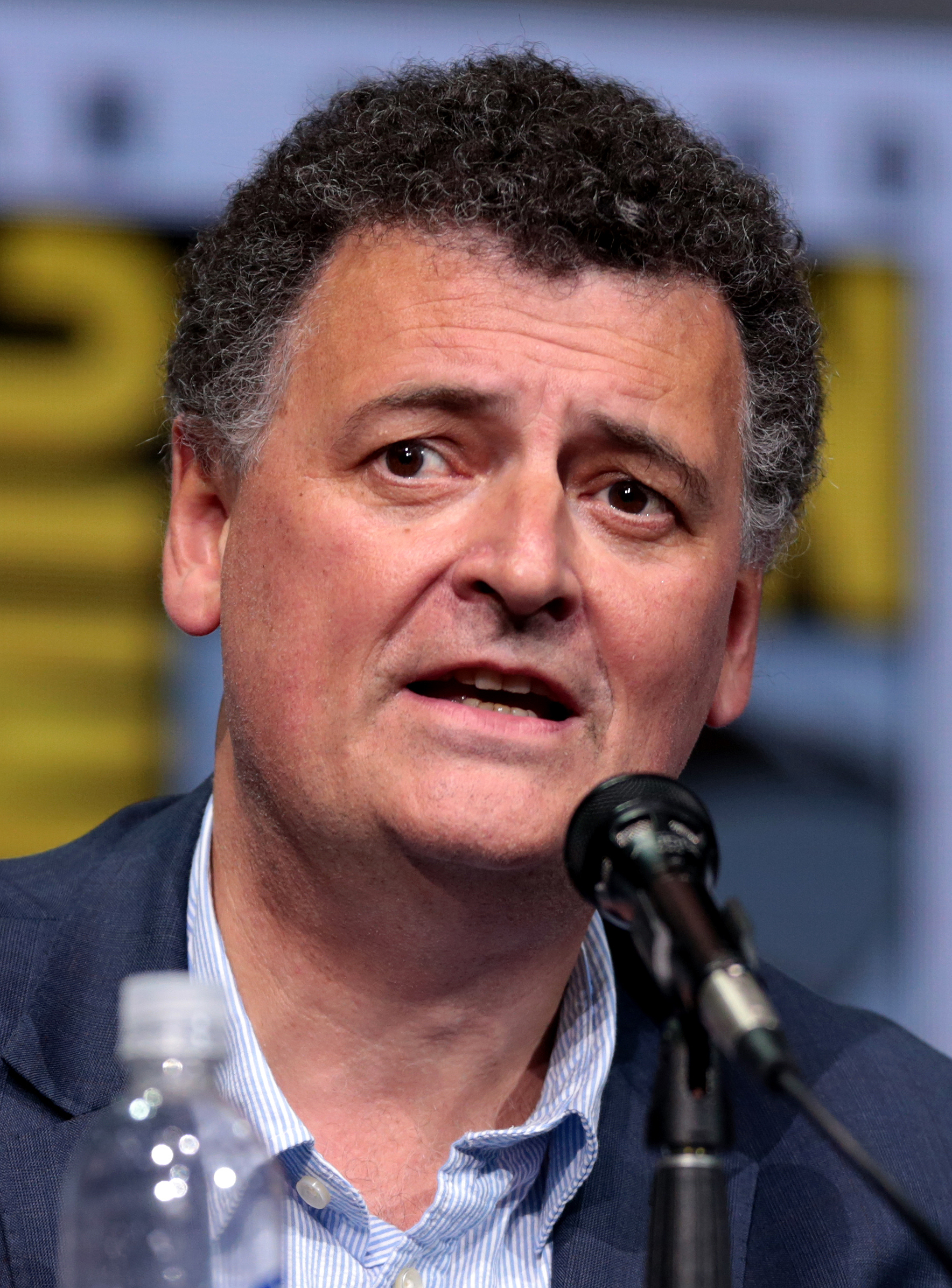
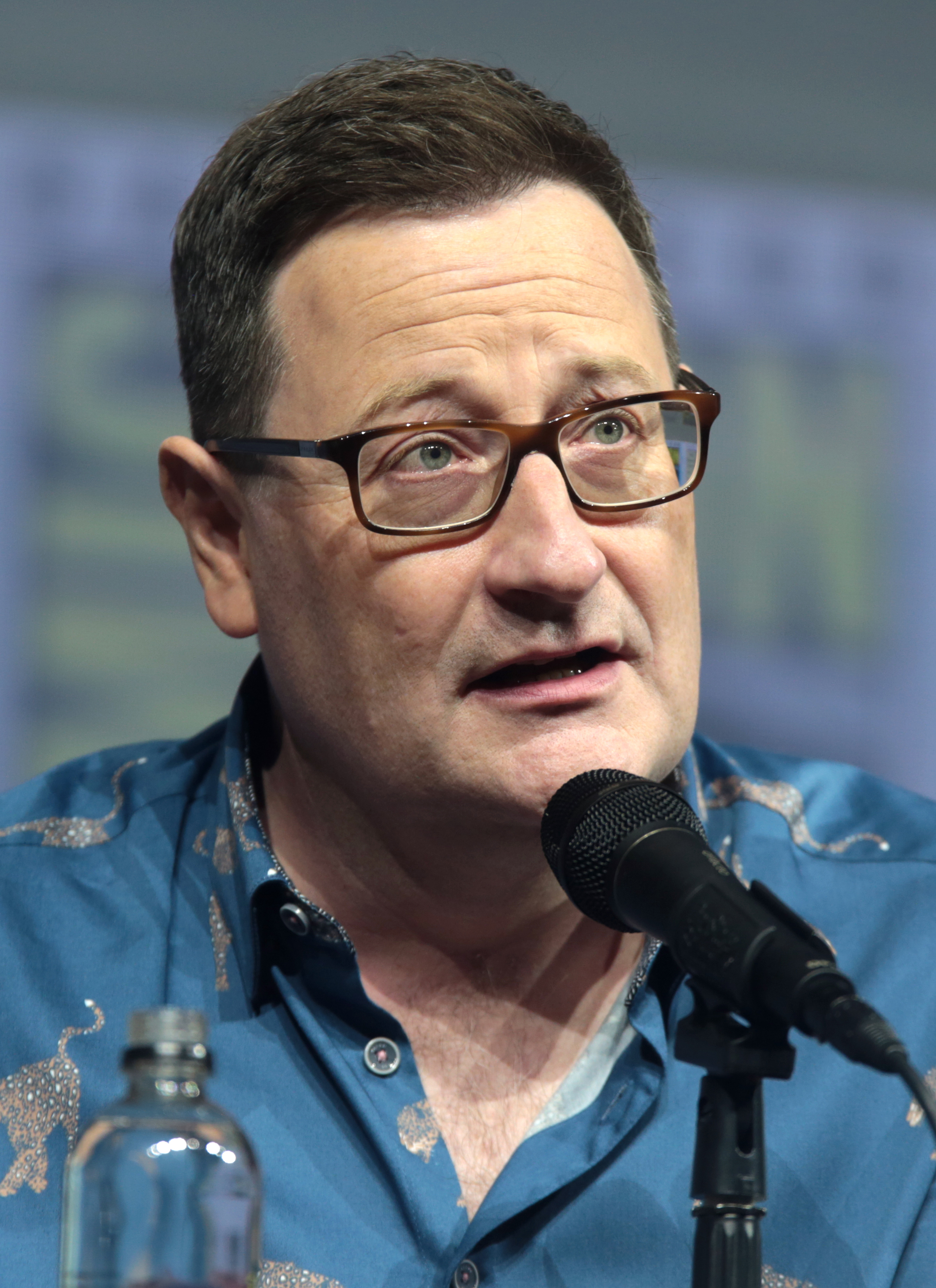
From left to right: Russell T Davies, Steven Moffat, and Chris Chibnall. All three have served as showrunners during the programme's 2005 revival.

Following the show's cancellation in 1989 and an aborted revival attempt via a television film in 1996, the show was properly revived in 2005. The revived series was initially headed by writer and showrunner Russell T Davies. Following Davies's departure in 2010, Steven Moffat took over, with Moffat staying on until Chris Chibnall took over as showrunner in 2018. Following Chibnall's tenure, Davies returned to the showrunner role in 2022. The revival changed and reinterpreted the show's setting, particularly in the form of the Last Great Time War, an event that radically shifted the universe's status quo.

Many of the monsters in the revival, unlike in the classic series, focused less on conquering territory. Many are instead attempting to survive and carry on their race, or do not know they are causing harm. One type of story that became prevalent in the show's revival is the "returning monster" story, which saw monsters from the Classic era of the show brought back and revamped; these stories tended to receive much higher press coverage and be more important within the show's narrative. Davies' initial time on the show saw the return of several monsters, who were incorporated and interpreted within the show's revamped mythology. Returning monsters included the Daleks, Cybermen, Sontarans, Nestenes and Autons, and the Macra. Returning monsters often saw their designs altered, striking a balance between "homage and revision". Unlike the Classic era, where these re-appearances hinged on prior episodes, episodes featuring these monsters often paid homage to prior episodes but did not require them to be understood by the show's audience.

A number of monsters as seen in 2010's "The Pandorica Opens", including Cybermen (left), Daleks (middle), Autons (resembling Roman legionaries) and Sontarans (right)

Moffat's tenure as showrunner saw the return of several monsters previously featured in Davies' tenure, but also saw the re-introduction of the Silurians, the Great Intelligence (albeit without its minions, the Yeti), the Ice Warriors, and the Zygons. The Silurians were brought back for the revival's fifth series, with the others brought back during the show's 2013 series, which aired in the show's fiftieth anniversary year. When asked in an interview, Moffat stated that he did not want to overly rely on the past of the series, and thus strayed away from bringing back older antagonists, including monsters. Moffat additionally stated that he believed that the series did not need to mine its history for further monsters to bring back. This influenced his decisions in regard to bringing back monsters; Moffat stated he was hesitant to bring back the Ice Warriors, with the Warriors being brought back only due to the insistence of writer Mark Gatiss, who was able to come up with an idea for the creatures that Moffat believed justified their return. The book Once Upon a Time Lord: The Myths and Stories of Doctor Who speculated that a similar rationale was behind the lack of a return for the Yeti in the new series.

Doctor Who's eleventh series, headed by Chris Chibnall as series showrunner, was the first time in the show's revival that a season or series lacked any returning monsters. Chibnall stated that this was done to focus on the future instead of the past of the show, allowing it to not be too reliant on past antagonists. Subsequent series headed by Chibnall re-introduced several more alien species to the series, such as the Cybermen, the Ood, the Weeping Angels, and the Sontarans. Chibnall's era also saw the first return of the Sea Devils as antagonists in the show's revival. Russell T Davies succeeded Chibnall as showrunner, where he announced that major alien species, such as the Daleks and Cybermen, would be rested temporarily in favour of the series taking a different direction. Davies' era saw the return of the Toymaker, Sutekh, and the Midnight Entity. Davies later headed the 2025 Doctor Who spin-off television series The War Between the Land and the Sea, which focused on a conflict between humanity and the Sea Devils.

== Introduced from 1963–1969 ==
=== Dalek ===
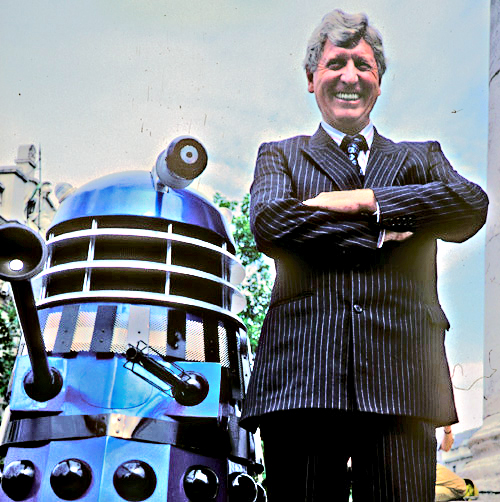
A Dalek (left) as pictured in a promotional photograph alongside actor Tom Baker

The Daleks are a warmongering, xenophobic race of mutant creatures who live within mobile battle armour, first appearing in The Daleks (1963-64). In-universe, the Daleks hail from the planet Skaro, and were created by a scientist named Davros as a way to survive and win a war between themselves and a species known as the Thals. They are life-long enemies of The Doctor, and he is the only being whom they fear. The Daleks see themselves as the superior lifeforms in the universe, and seek to eliminate all other life for being "impure". The creatures inside of their casings resemble squids, with a single eye, exposed brain and many tentacles. In the show's 2005 revival, the Daleks fought the Doctor's species, the Time Lords, in a conflict known as the Time War, which resulted in the destruction of the Daleks and the Time Lords alike, with the Doctor the sole survivor. The Doctor eventually comes into conflict with Dalek survivors as the series progresses, and the Daleks are eventually revived in the episode "Victory of the Daleks" (2010).

The Daleks were created by Terry Nation and designed by the BBC designer Raymond Cusick. The Daleks were designed to appear inhuman, and to not appear as though they were men in suits. Nation pulled from the cultural memory of World War II and the Nazis in designing the Daleks, with many of the Daleks' actions and personality being allegories for the Nazis. The Daleks acted as a highly recurring foe during Doctor Who's classic era, and were among its most popular. During the 1960s, public popularity for the Daleks was high, with this era being referred to as "Dalekmania". Despite The Beatles going on-air during the Daleks' second appearance, the return of the Daleks saw a higher viewer count. The Daleks were merchandised heavily during this period and grew wildly popular. The Daleks have been described as British cultural icons, and a 2008 survey by the National Trust stated that nine out of ten British children were able to identify a Dalek correctly.

==== Servants ====
Many different races have been used by the Daleks as servants in the series. These include the Robomen, humans converted into Dalek servants, who appear in the 1964 serial The Dalek Invasion of Earth, as well as the serial's 1966 film adaptation Daleks' Invasion Earth 2150 A.D., the Varga Plants, plant-based lifeforms that turn those they prick into half-plant, half-animal hybrids, which appear in the serials "Mission to the Unknown" (1965) and The Daleks' Master Plan (1966), the Ogrons, brutish figures who aid the Daleks in the 1972 serial Day of the Daleks and later the Daleks' ally the Master in the 1973 serial Frontier in Space, and the Dalek Puppets, living beings converted by nano-technology into servants by the Daleks, which appear in the 2012 episode "Asylum of the Daleks", the 2013 episode "The Time of the Doctor" and the 2015 episode "The Magician's Apprentice".

=== Thal ===
The Thals are a race of peaceful, blonde humanoids first seen in The Daleks (1963-64) who are natives of the planet Skaro. Once a warlike species, a nuclear conflict with the Daleks, which nearly wiped out all life on their home planet, led them to develop a pacifist, agrarian society. In their debut serial, the Thals aid the First Doctor and his companions in stopping the Daleks. The Thals re-appear in 1973's Planet of the Daleks, during which they help the Third Doctor in fighting the Daleks on the planet Spiridon. In 1975's Genesis of the Daleks, set during the nuclear conflict with the Daleks, the Thals are depicted fighting the Kaleds, the race that will become the Daleks, although in combat they are depicted as being just as evil as them during the war. The Thals also appear in 1965's Dr. Who and the Daleks, a film adaptation of The Daleks.

In the original storyline of The Daleks, the Thals were conceived of as malformed figures whom the Daleks believed to be responsible for the nuclear devastation of the planet, though in the end it would have been revealed that neither side started the war, with an unnamed third party doing so instead. This was changed during development, with the Thals' backstory being altered. The third party was removed, with both sides being made responsible for the nuclear conflict. The Thals additionally were made into handsome figures, being almost entirely male, with one "gorgeous woman" being added to the lineup to showcase the beauty of their species. 1973's Planet of the Daleks saw the return of the Thals, who were made more militaristic in nature; this characterisation in this serial was stated to be done to reflect the events of The Daleks, and how the Thals had grown more warlike to confront them.

The Thals appear in the 1997 novel War of the Daleks and the 2004 novel The Dalek Factor, which depict individual groups of Thals confronting the Daleks. The Thals appear in the audio drama series I, Davros. Thals also appear in several audio dramas, including 2000's The Mutant Phase, 2008's Brotherhood of the Daleks, and 2015's We Are the Daleks.

=== Voord ===
The Voord are a race of amphibious humanoids introduced in the 1964 serial The Keys of Marinus. The Voord are enigmatic, mysterious humanoids in black wetsuits. They attempted to work with their leader, Yartek, to gain the titular keys in order to obtain the Conscience of Marinus, which they sought to use for antagonistic purposes. They are defeated when Yartek takes a fake key, resulting in his death.

The Voord were created by Terry Nation, who had also created the Daleks, with costume designer Daphne Dare creating the visual design for the creatures. They were designed based on the wetsuit used for their costumes, with beetle-like aspects resulting in a "probe" on their helmets. Yartek was given a different design from other Voord in order to allow for easier communication of his lines. The species was marketed extensively and were an attempt to recapture the popularity of the Daleks, though these attempts were not as successful as the Daleks.

The Voord received significant expansion to their backstory and history in spin-off media. They appeared in a series of trading cards put out by Cadet Sweets with their candy cigarettes. The cards told a story in which the Voord were defeated by the Daleks. The species later appeared in 1965 comic The Fishmen of Kandalinga, where a surviving group from Marinus attempt to utilise the titular Fishmen as a workforce and food source. They are stopped by the First Doctor. In the 1987 comic story The World Shapers, they are stated to have evolved into Cybermen, with Marinus becoming the Cybermen's home planet of Mondas. The events of the comic strip were later referenced in the 2017 episode "The Doctor Falls", where the Twelfth Doctor refers to Marinus as one of the planets the Cybermen originated from. The Voord later appeared in the 2014 audio drama Domain of the Voord, in which the First Doctor and his companions fight against an invading group of Voord on a spaceship known as the Hydra. The drama greatly expands on Voord culture, revealing that they convert others into themselves via the black suits they wear, prolonging lifespan and granting them psychic powers. The later 2015 drama Beachhead also elaborated on the Voord's past. The 2015 Titan Comics strip Four Doctors focuses on the Voord following the Time War, which showed that they helped fight the Daleks in the conflict, evolving the species into a more powerful state. An alternate Twelfth Doctor attempted to lure his past selves to Marinus to ensure he would become a member of the species, but his plan is thwarted. They appear in the 2024 audio drama Coda - The Final Act, which depicts them alongside the Fugitive Doctor, and the 2025 audio drama The Voord Alliance, which depicts the character Susan Foreman allying with a group of Voord to fight the Daleks during the Time War.

=== Mechonoid ===
Mechonoids, also referred to as Mechanoids, are large, multifaceted, spherical robots created by humans. They first appear in the 1965 serial The Chase, which depicts them having been sent to prepare the planet Mechanus for colonisation. While working on the colonisation task, they imprison stranded astronaut Steven Taylor. A group of Daleks, pursuing the Doctor and his companions, engaged the Mechonoids in battle, allowing both them and Steven to escape.

During production the Mechonoids were originally called Mechons, but this was changed so that they would not be confused with a villain named the Mekon from the Dan Dare comics. However, there is a reference to "Mechons" in the finished serial, because the name was changed after the pre-recorded Dalek dialogue was taped. Due to a hope they would be able to match the Daleks in terms of popularity, considerable effort and budget was put into the Mechonoid props, and they were marketed extensively. Despite this, they were not as successful as the Daleks. The Mechonoid props were over five feet long, and as a result were considered too cumbersome and hard to move, resulting in the Mechonoids not returning in the television series.

The Mechonoids appeared in comics published by TV Century 21 from 1965 to 1966, often facing against the Daleks. They also appear in another 1960s comic, The World That Waits, where they fight the Daleks. The Mechonoids appear in the 2005 audio drama The Juggernauts, where several broken Mechonoids are repaired and made into the titular "Juggernauts" as weapons by the Daleks' creator, Davros. They also appear in the 2021 audio dramas House of Kingdom and Queen of the Mechonoids. The Mechonoids also appear in Daleks!, a 2020 web series published as part of the Time Lord Victorious multimedia crossover story. In the story, the Daleks, on the run from a powerful threat, are forced to ally with the Mechonoids in order to stand a chance against it.

=== The Toymaker ===
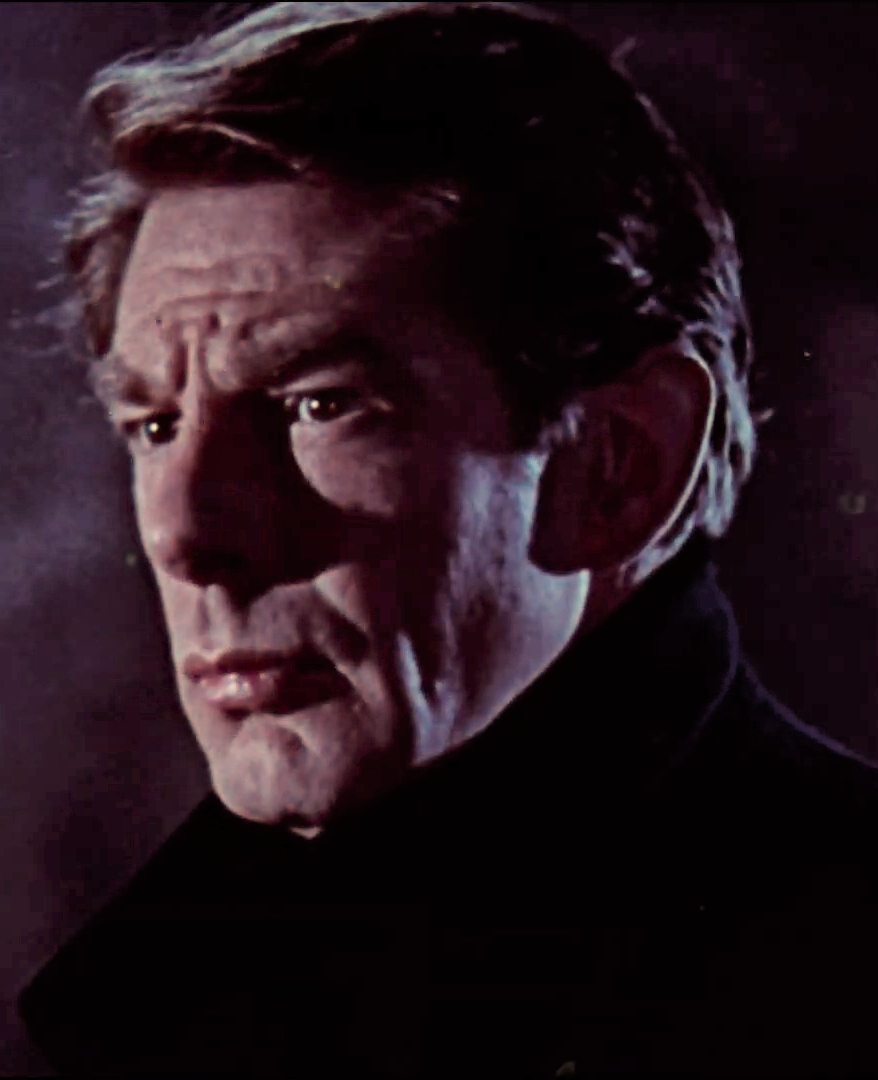
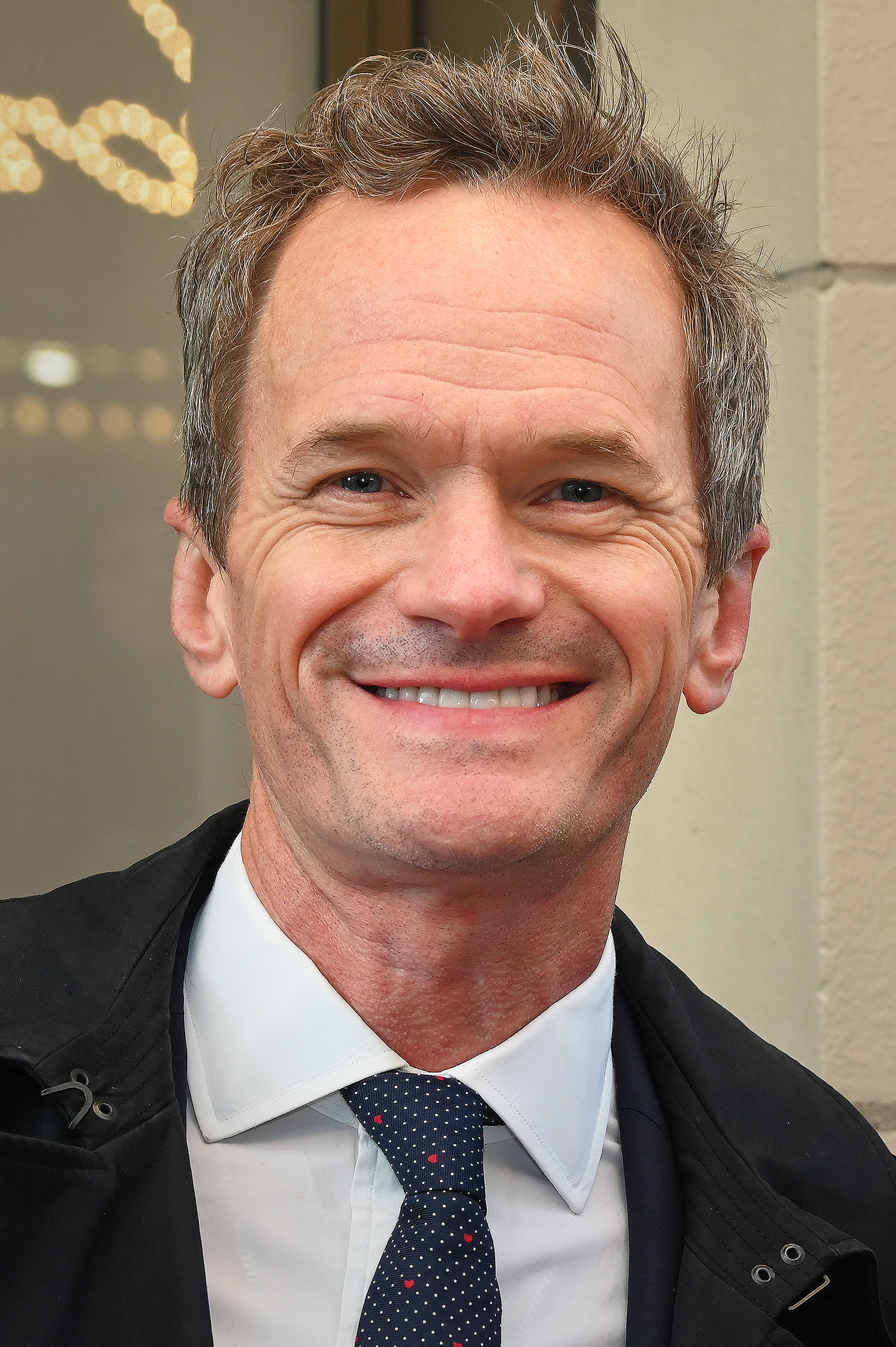
The Toymaker was portrayed by Michael Gough (left) in The Celestial Toymaker (1966), and by Neil Patrick Harris (right) in "The Giggle".

The Toymaker is an immortal, cosmic being who first appears in 1966's The Celestial Toymaker. The Toymaker uses his powers to force those who enter his realm, the Celestial Toyroom, to play games with their lives on the line. The Toymaker is beaten by the First Doctor, which allows the Doctor to escape the Toymaker. The Toymaker later returns in 2023 episode "The Giggle", which depicts the Toymaker escaping his realm and entering the universe, where he causes chaos. The Fourteenth Doctor confronts the Toymaker and challenges him to a game to force him to leave, but the Doctor loses. The Doctor is able to make the Toymaker agree to a best of three, which the Fourteenth Doctor and his Fifteenth incarnation are able to win by working together. Due to his loss, the Toymaker is sealed away. Maestro, a character stated to be the child of the Toymaker, appears as the main antagonist of the 2024 episode "The Devil's Chord".

The Toymaker was created by writer Brian Hayles. The Toymaker was stated by Donald Tosh, who was a writer on the Toymaker's debut story, to have originally been conceived of as a member of the Doctor's people prior to the later invention of the Time Lords. As the Time Lords' role expanded, subsequent spin-off media for the series described the Toymaker as a more cosmic force separate from them, which later was expanded upon in different forms of media. The Toymaker wore an outfit of Chinese origin; several retrospective sources have described this as being racist and relying on negative Chinese stereotypes. Though there were multiple plans to bring back the Toymaker during the show's original run, none of them came to fruition.

Russell T Davies later brought the Toymaker back for "The Giggle". Due to the inclusion of a puppet in the episode, Davies wanted to incorporate a puppet master pulling strings, which inspired Davies to use the Toymaker as an antagonist. The Toymaker utilises various different accents throughout the episode, which Davies explained was due to the fact that the Toymaker used stereotypical Chinese elements in the character's original appearance. Davies stated that he did not wish to "whitewash" the Toymaker, and thus expanded on the concept by having the Toymaker "playing with race" as a weapon in order to make the Toymaker a fundamentally evil character without ignoring racist caricatures present in the Toymaker's original serial. The Toymaker was portrayed by Michael Gough in his original 1966 television appearance, and by Neil Patrick Harris in 2023.

The Toymaker appears in several audio dramas in the Doctor Who: The Fourth Doctor Adventures range, where a female incarnation (Voiced by Annette Badland) appears. He also appears in the 2009 audio story The Magic Mousetrap, which depicts him facing off against the Seventh Doctor. The Toymaker has appeared in numerous comic stories for the series, and also appears in the 1999 novel Divided Loyalties.

=== Cyberman ===
The Cybermen are a race of cyborgs that first appeared in the 1966 serial The Tenth Planet. Having removed all emotion, the Cybermen repeatedly attempt a variety of plans, often endangering humanity. The Cybermen originate as humans from Earth's twin planet Mondas who cybernetically enhanced themselves to avoid death, and one of their goals in the series is to convert others into Cybermen. The Cybermen recur throughout the show's original run, frequently being considered the show's second most popular and iconic monster after the Daleks. In the show's 2005 revival, the Cybermen originate from a parallel Earth, though the Cybermen of the Doctor's universe end up taking over as antagonists in subsequent appearances.

The Cyberman concept was created by Dr. Kit Pedler and Gerry Davis in 1966, based around the ideas of the ethical issues present in innovations in prosthesis, with concerns of reaching a point in prosthetic surgery that it would be hard to determine how much of the original human remained. The Cybermen's popularity allowed for a quick return to the series, and the Cybermen subsequently recured frequently, with their design often changing from episode to episode.

Smaller creatures, dubbed Cybermats, are first introduced in 1967's The Tomb of the Cybermen. They act as scouts for the Cybermen in that serial, and in groups can convert other lifeforms into Cybermen. The Cybermats recur throughout the series, with each appearance giving them different abilities, such as the ability to poison those it attacks, or with the incorporation of organic teeth to chomp at its enemies. An even smaller variant used for conversion, dubbed the Cybermites, are introduced in the 2013 episode "Nightmare in Silver".

=== Macra ===
The Macra are an intelligent, giant, crab-like species who have an interstellar empire, being referred to as "the scourge of the galaxy". The Macra depend and feed on gas in order to live. The Macra first appear in a cameo in the 1967 serial The Moonbase, during which a Macra claw is seen on a viewing screen on the TARDIS at the end of the serial. They appear in the subsequent serial The Macra Terror (1967). In the serial the Macra's home planet was colonised by humans, and the Macra subsequently manipulate the human colonists behind the scenes to mine gas for them. The Second Doctor is able to reveal the Macra's presence, staging a revolution against them. An explosion in the colony's control centre destroys the Macra. The Macra re-appear in the 2007 episode "Gridlock", set many billions of years into the future. The Macra had "devolved", losing their intellect and becoming significantly larger. The Macra took up residence in the New New York City motorway, which had become filled with exhaust fumes of cars unable to escape the motorway.

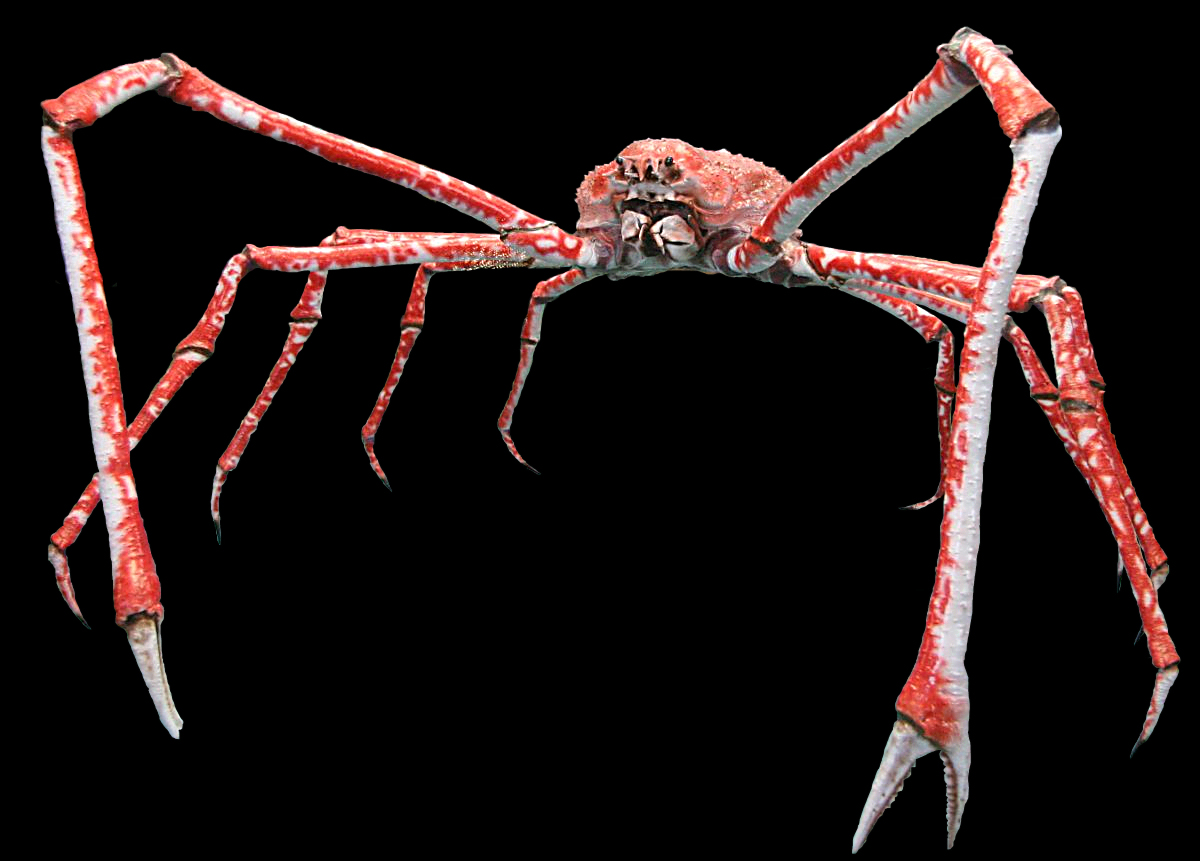
A Macrocheira kaempferi as pictured in 2006

The Macra were created by writer Ian Stuart Black. The Macra Terror's antagonists were originally "insect men" but were changed to the crab-like Macra partway through development to avoid confusion with another alien species called the Zarbi. Their names hailed from the Macrocheira kaempferi, also known as the Japanese spider crab, which is the largest known crustacean in the world. Despite changes to the script to accommodate for the Macra being crabs, they were still referred to as insects at times. The Macra prop used in the serial was over ten feet tall, being controlled by a single operator inside. The prop's eyes glowed when it was active and did not when the Macra were inactive. Their re-appearance in "Gridlock" was due to then-showrunner Russell T Davies wanting to bring back a largely forgotten monster. Originally set in the seas of the planet New Earth, the episode was to feature giant crabs, which Davies decided to eventually make into Macra. As the story evolved and the sea element was dropped, transitioning to the episode's motorway environment, Davies elected to keep the Macra, as the Macra feeding on gas allowed them to still function in this new version of the story. One scrapped idea was of small baby Macra who were planned to have eaten passengers in the motorway. The Macra in this episode were portrayed entirely via computer-generated imagery, unlike the original prop-operated Macra.

Macra appear in the 2010 spin-off Choose Your Own Adventure novel Claws of the Macra, and also appear in a 2016 back-up comic strip titled Surfshock.

=== Great Intelligence ===
The Great Intelligence is a disembodied being who first appears in the 1967 serial The Abominable Snowmen and serves as a recurring antagonist in the series. In its debut serial, the Intelligence attempted to attack a Tibetan monastery using its robotic creations, the Yeti (see below). The Intelligence subsequently appeared in the 1968 serial The Web of Fear, where it attempted to invade the London Underground using its Yeti minions. The Intelligence later appears in the 2012 episode "The Snowmen", where it takes the form of "intelligent snow" in Victorian England and manipulates the mind of a man named Walter Simeon into helping it conquer the Earth. The Intelligence then proceeds with another plan in the twenty-first century to kidnap the minds of people using the Wi-Fi in the 2013 episode "The Bells of Saint John". The 2013 episode "The Name of the Doctor" sees the Intelligence, seeking revenge against the Doctor for its various defeats, taking the form of Simeon and capturing friends of the Eleventh Doctor in order to lure the Doctor to his tomb. The Intelligence seeks to use the tomb to access the Doctor's history, where it will rewrite the Doctor's victories into defeats. The Intelligence is defeated by the Doctor's companion Clara Oswald, who undoes the damage caused by the Intelligence.

The Intelligence uses a variety of different creations as minions to accomplish its plans. These include the Yeti, as well as other creations, including the Snowmen, Spoonheads, and Whisper Men. These creatures diverged significantly from the Yeti: the Snowmen were sentient snowmen, the Spoonheads were robots that harvested human minds using the Wi-Fi, and the Whisper Men were faceless humanoids in Victorian fashion that whisper dark nursery rhymes under their breath.

==== Yeti ====
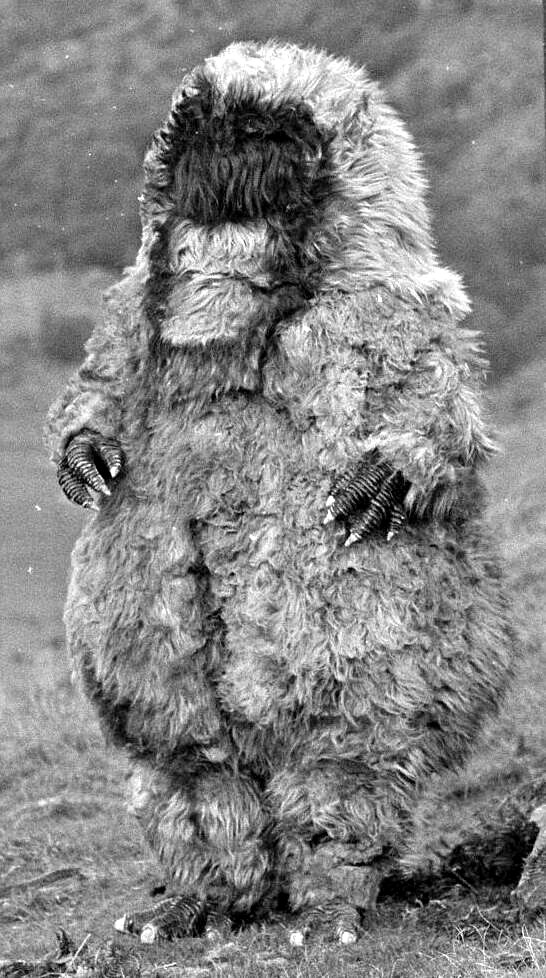
A Yeti as pictured during filming of the 1967 serial The Abominable Snowmen

The Yeti are robots created by the Great Intelligence. The Yeti serve the Intelligence's will, acting as footsoldiers for it. The Yeti first appear in The Abominable Snowmen (1967), where they act as servants of the Intelligence. They re-appear in 1968's The Web of Fear, where they are again used by the Intelligence. A Yeti makes a cameo appearance in 1969 serial The War Games. Another later appears briefly in "The Five Doctors," (1983) where it attacks the Second Doctor and his companion Brigadier Lethbridge-Stewart in a cave, though they are able to escape from it.

The Yeti were created by writers Henry Lincoln and Mervyn Haisman. Lincoln had spoken with then-lead actor Patrick Troughton, who expressed disappointment in the lack of Earth-bound stories in his first season as the Doctor. Lincoln worked with Haisman to develop the concept, choosing the stories of the Yeti as a suitable concept around which to create a serial of the programme, as it was a creature viewers were familiar with; it could also reasonably be adapted as the creature was never found, and thus was not proven to actually exist. Producer Innes Lloyd was interested in doing an episode set in the Himalayas and also saw the monsters as a potential replacement for the Daleks, which had recently been written out of the programme. Due to the pair realising the Yeti likely would not be sentient, they elected to create an Intelligence that controlled them, which became their master, the Great Intelligence. The production team, knowing the Yeti would be popular, commissioned a second serial to feature them. Due to costume deterioration and criticism that the Yeti were too "cuddly" in their first appearance, the Yeti were redesigned. Due to a rights dispute involving another of Lincoln and Haisman's creations, the Quarks, the Intelligence and Yeti were retired as antagonists in the television series. Though the Intelligence later returned as an antagonist in the show's revival, the Yeti were not brought back with it.

=== Ice Warrior ===
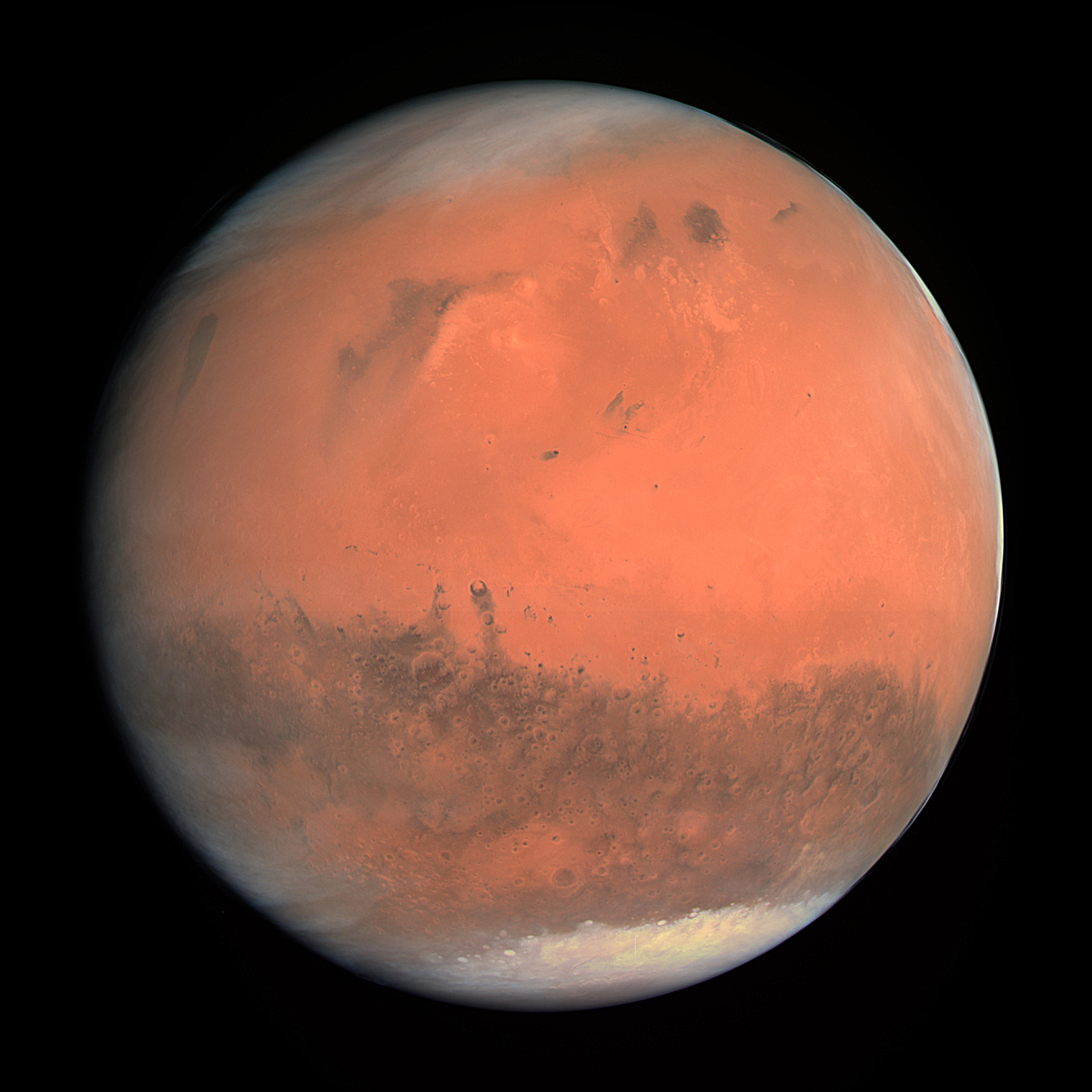
The Ice Warriors hail from the planet Mars

The Ice Warriors are a reptilian warrior race who hail from the planet Mars. They wear special bio-mechanical armour which protects them from attack and hostile temperature conditions. This armour also has sonic weapons, which are mounted into their wrists. The Ice Warriors also follow an honour code, and are ruled either by an "Ice Lord", or an "Ice Queen". Ice Warriors have been depicted as being both antagonists and supporting characters throughout the series.

In 1967, as part of plans to expand the amount of monsters present in the series, the Doctor Who production team wished to introduce a new race of alien creatures. Writer Brian Hayles ended up creating the Ice Warriors, which were inspired by several concepts, such as the idea of life on Mars. Costume designer Martin Baugh designed the Ice Warriors' physical appearance, creating a hard, armoured creature as a result of being inspired by the name "Ice Warrior". Baugh additionally incorporated crocodile-like aspects, leading to them becoming reptilian monsters; according to some accounts, Hayles' original concept was of cyborg Vikings, and the reptilian aspect of their design was a creation of Baugh's. Due to popularity with audiences, the Ice Warriors later ended up becoming recurring antagonists. The 1972 serial The Curse of Peladon saw the return of the Ice Warriors as supporting characters, resulting in their roles in the series becoming more nuanced and multifaceted.

=== Quark ===
The Quarks first appeared in the Second Doctor serial The Dominators (1969). The Quarks are robots that serve villainous warlords known as the Dominators. They have energy weapons embedded in their arms. In the serial, the Quarks aid the Dominators in an invasion of the planet Dulkis but are thwarted by the Second Doctor. Following this appearance, a Quark briefly cameos in the 1969 serial The War Games.

The Quarks were created by Mervyn Haisman and Henry Lincoln. The Quarks were named after the quarks, which were being researched at the time, with the design of the Quark being based on the success of the Daleks' inhuman design. The Quarks were physically portrayed by young children, but were voiced by actress Sheila Grant. Grant's performance was heavily modulated, sped up, and edited to achieve the Quarks' voices, as well as sound effects related to the Quarks. Following their appearance in The Dominators, the Quarks became recurring antagonists in the Doctor Who comics published by TV Comic, appearing in multiple comics throughout 1969. The usage of the Quarks in these comics came under scrutiny from their creators, with confusion arising over the usage of the Quarks in terms of copyright. Though the conclusion of the discussion between them and the BBC was unclear, the two writers never returned to the series, and resulted in the retirement of both the Quarks and Yeti from the television series going forward.

The Quarks appear in the 1982 spin-off comic The Fires Down Below, where a UNIT soldier fights and defeats an attempted invasion of Earth by the Quarks and Dominators. The Quarks also appear alongside the Dominators in the 2013 comic Quiet on Set. They appear by themselves, without the Dominators, in the 2017 comic The Lost Dimension, where the Fourth Doctor encounters a group of Quarks that hail from an alternate universe where, without the Daleks to stop them, they became the most powerful creatures of their home reality. The Quarks appear in several books in the Lethbridge-Stewart spin-off novel series, which features the character Brigadier Lethbridge-Stewart, including 2015's Mutually Assured Domination, 2019's Home Fires Burn, and 2022's The Analysis Bureau. They also appear in 2021 spin-off series The Lucy Wilson Mysteries in the anthology book Attack of the Quarks.

=== Time Lord ===
The Time Lords are a race of humanoid aliens who hail from the planet Gallifrey. The Time Lords are a race that created time travel in-universe, and, when killed, have the ability to regenerate, which allows them to survive lethal injuries, and will cause them to change their physical appearance. The Doctor, the show's main protagonist, is a Time Lord. Originally, though, details of the Doctor's home and species were not specified; the existence of the Time Lords and the Doctor's relationship with them was not explained until the 1969 serial The War Games. Though originally portrayed as "austere, god-like beings," the Time Lords were later re-contextualised by the 1976 serial The Deadly Assassin, which portrayed them as having political struggles and having made their advancements through science rather than any mystical abilities.

The Time Lords first appeared in The War Games; in the serial, the Second Doctor encountered a threat so large he needed the Time Lords' power to resolve it. They subsequently put the Doctor on trial and later exiled him to Earth during his Third incarnation. Following this, they served a recurring role throughout the show's Classic series, sometimes acting as both antagonists and supporting characters. They eventually were killed prior to the events of the show's 2005 revival in a conflict known as the Time War, resulting in their removal from the universe. Though the Time Lords were later brought back to life during the revival's events, they were killed again during the events of the 2020 story "Spyfall".

Several Time Lords serve as recurring characters. Susan Foreman, the Doctor's granddaughter, served as one of his companions during his first incarnation. Romana is another Time Lord who serves as a companion, in this case alongside the Fourth Doctor. Characters such as the Master and the Rani are also Time Lords who both serve as recurring antagonists in the series, with the Master serving as the Doctor's archnemesis, often attempting to defeat the Doctor with a variety of evil schemes, while the Rani is an amoral scientist who seeks to use the universe to conduct her experiments. The characters of Rassilon, Omega, and Tecteun are founding figures in Time Lord society, with Omega and Rassilon inventing time travel while Tecteun was able to create regeneration in Time Lords; all three serve as recurring antagonists in the series.

== Introduced from 1970–1989 ==
=== Nestene Consciousness and Auton ===
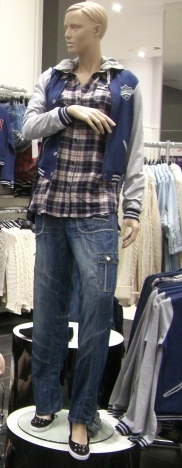
A mannequin as pictured in a United Kingdom department store in 2011

The Nestene Consciousness is a non-corporeal, formless entity that possesses the ability to control and manipulate plastic. The Nestenes use Autons, living plastic mannequins, as footsoldiers, with Autons having guns built into their hands in order to attack. Both the Nestene Consciousness and the Autons first appear in the 1970 serial Spearhead from Space, where the Nestene Consciousness uses the Autons in an attempt to invade the Earth. The Nestenes later re-appear in 1971 serial Terror of the Autons, where they once again attempt an invasion of Earth using various plastic objects, including many different kinds of Autons. The Nestene Consciousness later appears in 2005's "Rose", where it is revealed to have had its home planet destroyed in the Time War. It attempts to invade Earth using Autons again, but is defeated by the Ninth Doctor's companion Rose Tyler. It re-appears in 2010's "The Pandorica Opens" and "The Big Bang", where it is a member of an alliance to imprison the Doctor, where it uses many Auton duplicates to trick the Doctor, including one based on his deceased companion Rory Williams. The Nestenes are subsequently erased from existence alongside the Autons, with the exception of Rory, who aids the Doctor in restoring the universe.

Due to the "Earthbound" format put in place during the 1970s, the production team believed "alien invasion" stories had potential. Writer Robert Holmes conceived of the idea of a formless intelligence, while the production team, inspired by an idea from Derrick Sherwin, believed the idea of mannequins coming to life could be effectively utilised as antagonists. Holmes gave the formless creature, the Nestenes, the ability to control plastic, including mannequins. The Nestenes and Autons subsequently returned in 1971 in Terror of the Autons, with the story being considered so terrifying by viewers and critics alike that the production team decided to bring back adventures set in outer space, which had previously been avoided. The re-appearance of the creatures in "Rose", the first episode of the show's 2005 revival, was done by then-showrunner Russell T Davies to make sure that Rose did not immediately assume that the creatures were an alien threat, which was important in the episode's narrative. Additionally, he felt the Autons' mannequin-like design provided a familiar threat for children watching the episode.

=== Silurian and Sea Devil ===
Silurians are a reptilian humanoid species first seen in Doctor Who and the Silurians (1970), with the Sea Devils, an aquatic race related to the Silurians, debuting in The Sea Devils (1972). The Silurians and Sea Devils are a race of reptilian humanoids who lived on Earth at the dawn of time. Their species were highly technologically advanced, and their computers detected that a planet-like object would collide with Earth. To survive, they put themselves into hibernation, but as the planet-like object, the Moon, never crashed into the Earth, the Silurians' computers never awoke them, leaving them trapped in hibernation. Stories featuring the Silurians and Sea Devils depict the Doctor attempting to negotiate with them and the humans in an attempt at finding peace between them and humanity, though these end without an agreement, often with the Silurians and Sea Devils being destroyed by the humans. A recurring Silurian character, Madame Vastra, was introduced in the show's 2005 revival, serving as one of the series' first on-screen lesbian characters. The Sea Devils reappeared as major characters of spin-off series The War Between the Land and the Sea, which depicts a conflict between them and humanity. In that series, they refer to themselves as "Homo Aqua".

Malcolm Hulke is credited with creating the Silurian concept, which was an attempt to subvert the limitations of the "Earthbound" format the series was in during the early 1970s, where the Doctor was stranded on Earth. This was accomplished via having the Silurians not be invaders of Earth, but instead be the Earth's original inhabitants attempting to reclaim the planet. While planning stories for Doctor Who's ninth season, Dicks and Letts decided to revive the Silurian concept, being impressed with the original idea. They wanted the Silurians to this time originate from the sea. Originally dubbed "Sea Silurians", they were rechristened "Sea Devils" for dramatic effect as Hulke's storyline was edited. Both species' return in Warriors of the Deep was part of an effort to bring back past antagonists following the series' twentieth anniversary. Their return in the 2010 episodes "The Hungry Earth" and "Cold Blood" was done by then-showrunner Steven Moffat due to him greatly liking the species' concept, with the species being redesigned to resemble humans and appear less alien in order to bring out the actors' performance.

=== Aggedor ===
Aggedor is the Sacred Royal Beast of the planet Peladon, with Aggedor first appearing in The Curse of Peladon (1972). The real creature upon which the legend is based is a large, hairy beast with a single horn. Hunted to near extinction, one Aggedor beast roamed the tunnels below the citadel of the planet and, at one stage, was used to judge prisoners who were cast into a pit as punishment. Peladon's High Priest, Hepesh, secretly captured the remaining Aggedor, and used it to attempt to generate superstition about the "curse" of Aggedor in order to stop Peladon from joining the Galactic Federation, an intergalactic alliance of planets. The Aggedor killed Hepesh, and the same Aggedor later returned in The Monster of Peladon (1974).

In the 2007 audio story The Bride of Peladon, after the death of the original Aggedor, it was revealed the Aggedor had a child, which remained hidden for many years. The Fifth Doctor mind-controlled this Aggedor to aid them, after which it gave birth to many baby Aggedors.

=== Draconian ===
The Draconians (also called Dragons, a derogatory term in their culture) are a humanoid race seen in Frontier in Space (1973). Common interstellar travel and attempts at colonisation brought them into frequent and occasionally hostile contact with humans, leading to a treaty establishing a frontier between the two empires. Antagonist the Master attempted to trick the two sides into thinking the other broke the treaty in order to provoke galactic war, but after the truth was revealed, the Draconians allied with the humans to combat the Master.

Created by writer Malcolm Hulke, the conflict between Earth and Draconia (the Draconians' home planet) was inspired by the Cold War divide of Earth into sides of "East" and "West", particularly in the form of the United States and USSR's interactions with the other. The Draconians were designed as a "noble" race that resembled the Hapsburgs, with Hulke wanting the Draconians to be considered "individuals" rather than a single uniform race, much like his prior creation, the Silurians. Despite the initial Hapsburg inspirations, the Draconians ended up being more inspired both in concept and visually by the Japanese Shogun. Changes were made to the Draconians' designs as a result, including having Draconians have large collars as part of their design. The Draconian masks and makeup were designed so actors had an easier time performing in the costumes, and the Draconians were given a hissing voice when they spoke.

1992 novel Love and War depicts Draconians alongside humans in the far future. The 1998 novel Catastrophea depicts the Draconians being unhappy with human colonisation of the planet Catastrophea, leading to a conflict. Eventually, they are able to work together, and both agree to leave the planet alone. The 2020 online short story The Simple Things sees a Draconian attempting to repair a battle cruiser in 1896 West Ham with the help of an ironworks company. A Draconian named Salazar appears in the 1980 comic strip Star Tigers as an ally of the character Abslom Daak. The 2009 comic strip Cold Blooded War! depicts a meeting between Draconians and the Ice Warriors, and another 2009 comic story, Fugitive, features a Draconian delegate, who, after being arrested, aids the Tenth Doctor in helping to stop a Krillitane invasion of intergalactic law body the Shadow Proclamation. Draconians appear in the several audio dramas, including 2003's The Draconian Rage, 2007's The Judas Gift, and Freedom of Information, 2009's Paper Cuts, 2021's Conspiracy in Space. Draconians appear in the Bernice Summerfield audio drama series The Eternity Club. A Draconian appears in the 1998 film Mindgame.

=== Sontaran ===
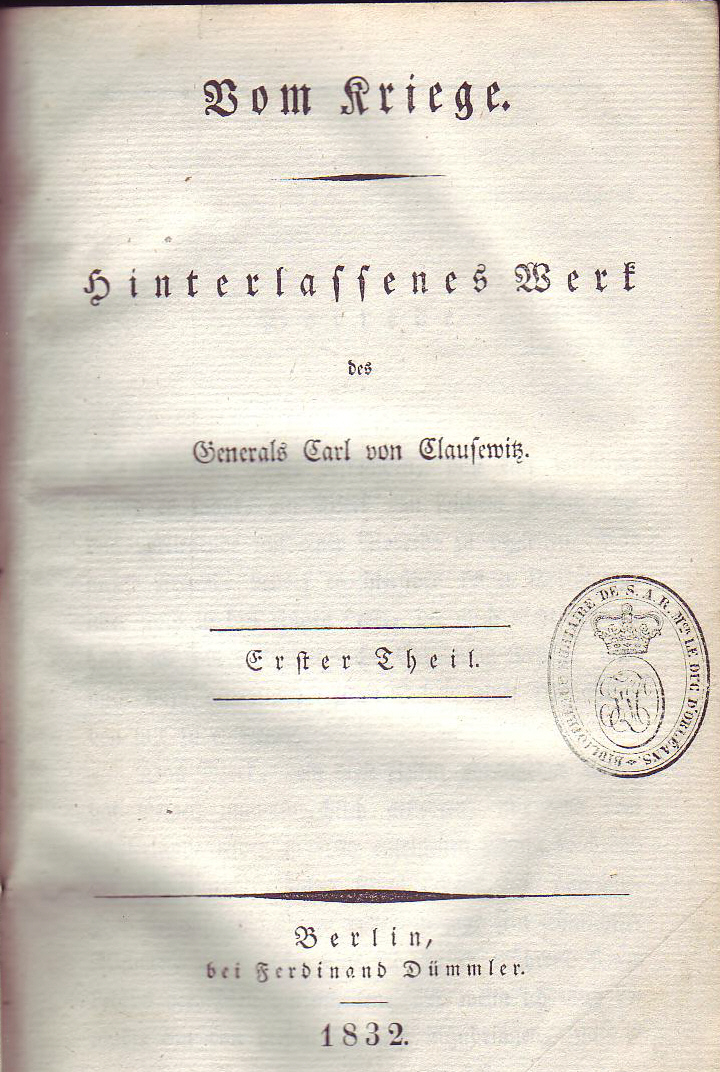
The title page of the original German language edition of On War, which the Sontarans were partially based on

The Sontarans are a clone race that hail from the planet Sontar, and are bred for war from birth. They are engaged in a constant, never-ending war against a species known as the Rutans. They have a culture dedicated almost solely to war, with dying in battle being considered the ultimate honour among their race, as is entering a battle without a protective helmet. Sontarans only have a single weak point: a "probic vent" on the back of their neck, through which they receive energy, with a single hit there dealing heavy damage to a Sontaran. Sontarans are physically shorter than humans due to their homeworld being a planet that has high gravity. The Sontarans first appear in the 1973 serial The Time Warrior and have gone on to be recurring antagonists in the series.

The Sontarans were created by writer Robert Holmes. Holmes conceived of the Sontarans after reading the 1832 war treatise On War, and was additionally inspired by the Vietnam War, particularly in the form of the American troops who were deployed into a conflict between other countries. The Sontarans' design changed multiple times throughout the years, with different Sontarans being very physically distinct from other designs.

==== Rutan ====
The Rutans are a shapeshifting, jellyfish-like race that are at constant war with the Sontarans. They are first mentioned in 1973's The Time Warrior, though only appear physically on-screen in 1975's Horror of Fang Rock. Like the Sontarans, Rutans are belligerent and militaristic, seeking only to win against their enemies in the war. In Horror of Fang Rock, a Rutan scout arrives on Earth at a lighthouse and seeks to take control of the planet to aid in the Rutans' war against the Sontarans. The serial's writer, Terrance Dicks, elected to make the Rutans shapeshifters to contrast them with the Sontarans; where the Sontarans are identical, cloned beings, Rutans are blobby and capable of changing their appearance at will. The jellyfish resemblance was created due to the serial's seaside setting.

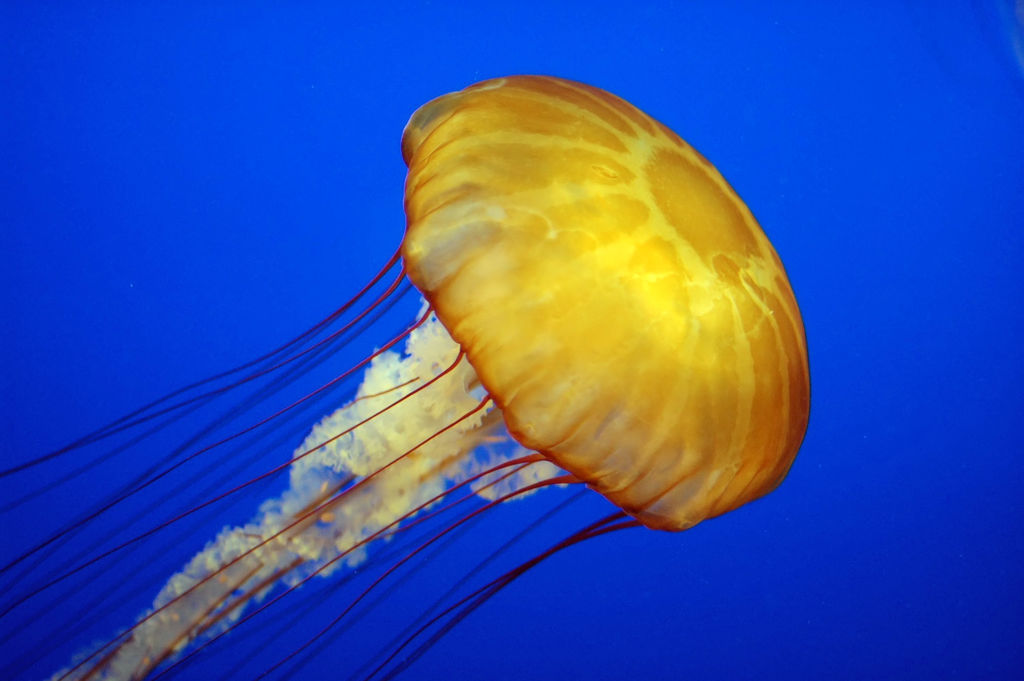
The Rutans greatly resemble jellyfish (pictured)

Rutans appear fighting Sontarans in a war in the 1994 film Shakedown: Return of the Sontarans. Rutans appear in two 2009 books: The Sontaran Games and The Taking of Chelsea 426, which depict Rutans attempting to interfere with Sontaran invasion efforts of Earth. Rutans appear in the video game 2011 video game Doctor Who: The Adventure Games, where they appear in a setting based on the real world Gunpowder Plot. In the game, the Rutans are present on Earth during this time and seek a "doomsday weapon" that will allow them to kill the Sontarans and end the war, though their plan is thwarted by the Eleventh Doctor. 2013 comic story Prisoners of Time depicts the Fifth Doctor rescuing a group of Sontarans from a Rutan attack. 1998 novel The Infinity Doctors depicts the Eighth Doctor forging a peace deal between the Sontarans and Rutans.

=== Zygon ===
The Zygons are shape-shifting aliens first encountered in Terror of the Zygons (1975). In the episode, the Zygon home world had been destroyed, and they attempted to conquer the Earth in order to claim it as their new home world. They later re-appeared in the fiftieth anniversary special "The Day of the Doctor," (2013) where they attempted to conquer the planet once more, with it being implied that their home planet was destroyed in the Time War. The Zygons and humans negotiate a peace treaty, leading to Zygons living among humans on Earth. In "The Zygon Invasion" and "The Zygon Inversion," (2015) a splinter group of Zygons is unhappy with having to hide away among humans, per the terms of the treaty, and attempt to change the status quo so they can live in their natural forms. The Twelfth Doctor is able to negotiate with the splinter group's leader, Bonnie, and come to a peaceful solution.

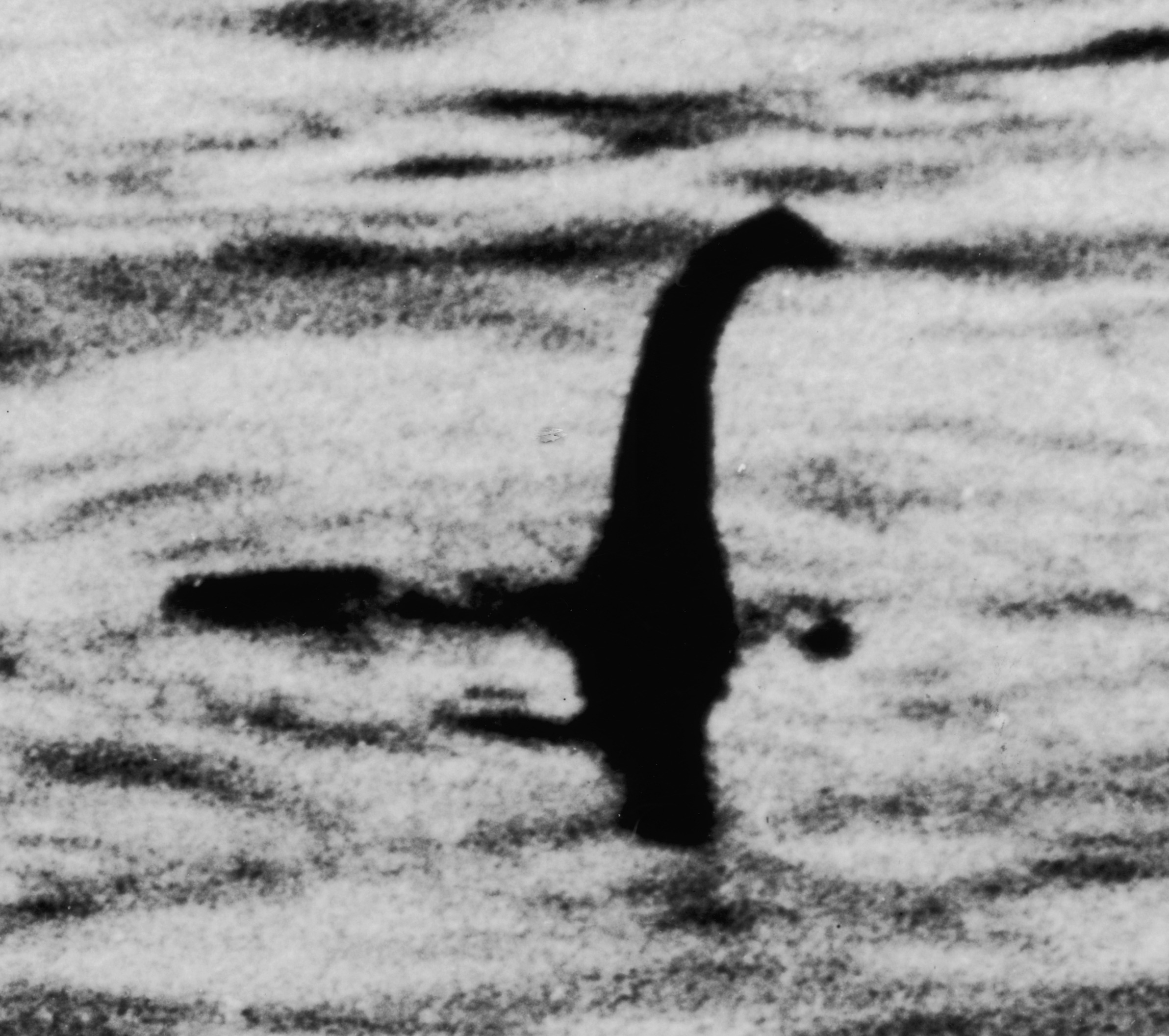
The Zygons came about as a result of a story intended to focus on the Loch Ness Monster (famous hoax seen above)

The Zygons were created by writer Robert Banks Stewart. Originally intending to write a serial about the Loch Ness Monster, script editor Robert Holmes had Stewart refocus the story on the alien species associated with the Monster (actually an alien named the Skarasen), resulting in the Zygons taking the centre stage of their debut serial. Their re-appearance in the show's 2005 revival in the 2013 anniversary special "The Day of the Doctor" was a result of showrunner Steven Moffat. Moffat was greatly impressed by the Zygons as they appeared in their debut serial, and came up with an idea for a sequel to the story which would depict homeless Zygons settling on Earth and discussed issues such as immigration, refugees, resettlement, ghettoisation, and the radicalisation of factions that led to terrorism. These ideas were established in "The Day of the Doctor", with Moffat using the episode to set up for a later story that focused on this idea; this was explored in 2015's "The Zygon Invasion" and "The Zygon Inversion".

=== Sisterhood of Karn ===
The Sisterhood of Karn are a female religion situated on the planet Karn. Karn is present in the same solar system as the Time Lords' home planet Gallifrey, and the Sisterhood have a long history of collaboration with the Time Lords. They are capable of making the "Elixir of Eternal Life", which they had previously shared with the Time Lords. The Elixir could aid Time Lords in undergoing difficult regenerations, and though the Sisterhood does not trust the Time Lords, they occasionally give them the Elixir. The Sisterhood first appear in The Brain of Morbius (1976), where they had grown paranoid as a result of a past betrayal by the Time Lord Morbius. Since then, they had been using their mental powers to crash ships onto the planet's surface. The Eternal Flame, which they use to make the Elixir, had become clogged by soot one year prior to the events of the story, and the Sisterhood had been trying to fix it to no avail. The Doctor solves the problem, and the Sisterhood later aid him in stopping the revived Morbius. They later reappear in the 2013 mini-episode "The Night of the Doctor," where they revive a mortally wounded Eighth Doctor and help him regenerate into his next incarnation. They make further appearances in "The Magician's Apprentice" (2015) and "Hell Bent" (2015).

The Sisterhood was created by Terrance Dicks. The concept for the Sisterhood was lifted from H. Rider Haggard's novel She: A History of Adventure, in which an immortal character is given new life by "the Flame of Life". The Sisterhood's costumes were cheaply made, with some props being constructed with plastic teaspoons from the BBC's tea lady. Steven Moffat brought the Sisterhood back for his mini-episode "Night of the Doctor" due to a fondness for the Sisterhood as a concept, with the Sisterhood, particularly one of their number, Ohila, being brought back for "The Magician's Apprentice" out of Moffat's desire to feature them again.

The Sisterhood further appears in several audio dramas for the series, including 2008's Sisters of the Flame, and Vengeance of Morbius, 2017's The Lost Flame, 2021's Light the Flame, and 2024's Morbius the Mighty, and Dark Gallifrey: Morbius.

=== Sutekh ===
A depiction of the Egyptian god Set, on which Sutekh was based

Sutekh is a member of the Osirian race who first appears in the 1975 serial Pyramids of Mars. Prior to the serial's events, Sutekh was once the leader of the Osirians alongside his brother Horus. Eventually, Sutekh destroyed their home planet Osiris, as well as half a galaxy. He was captured and imprisoned on Earth for his crimes by Horus and sealed away for 7000 years. In-universe, the battle between the two inspired Egyptian mythology. During the events of Pyramids of Mars, Sutekh begins to attempt to free himself from his prison. Sutekh revives ancient Osirian service robots, covered in bandages and resembling mummies, in order to carry out his will. Sutekh seeks to destroy the pyramid that lies on Mars, which sends out a beacon that keeps him imprisoned. Though Sutekh is eventually able to escape, the Doctor succeeds in imprisoning Sutekh inside of a "time tunnel," which sends Sutekh forwards in time to his own death. Sutekh is able to survive the time tunnel, however, and latches on to the Doctor's TARDIS. His power grows after latching onto the TARDIS, allowing Sutekh to attain god-like powers. Sutekh eventually reveals himself during the events of the 2024 episode "The Legend of Ruby Sunday." Though Sutekh is able to destroy all life in the universe in the subsequent episode, "Empire of Death" (2024), the Fifteenth Doctor is able to defeat Sutekh by dragging him through the time vortex, which revives all the life in the universe that Sutekh had previously destroyed.

Pyramids of Mars was heavily inspired by Egyptian mythology, with Sutekh being based on the Egyptian god Set, though the alternate name Sutekh was chosen for the Doctor Who character instead. Sutekh and other Egyptian elements were recontextualised in-universe as being aliens from another planet instead of being gods. The serial's script was largely written by Robert Holmes, who greatly expanded on a draft by Lewis Greifer. Thus, despite largely being conceived by Holmes, some consider Greifer to be Sutekh's creator. Sutekh's return in "The Legend of Ruby Sunday" and "Empire of Death" was a result of then-showrunner Russell T Davies having seen Sutekh's debut serial as a child, and having desired to write a return ever since; the ideas he had as a child were adapted into the plot of the episodes. When designing Sutekh for "Empire of Death," the design team wanted to recreate the original "aesthetic" of Sutekh from Pyramids while also making him not resemble any particular culture or time period, instead portraying Sutekh as an "ancient" and "malevolent" force. Actor Gabriel Woolf portrays Sutekh in all of his appearances in the television series.

Sutekh has appeared in a variety of spin-off media since his introduction to the series, having appeared in comics and audio dramas which expanded on the character's lore and history.

=== Krynoid ===
The Krynoids are an invasive, alien weed that appear in the 1976 story The Seeds of Doom. In the serial, a pair of Krynoid seed pods are discovered in the Antarctic and begin to germinate when brought into a nearby research base. The pods begin to infect humans and slowly turn them into Krynoids, which when fully grown threaten to consume all animal life on the planet. The Fourth Doctor is able to stop the Krynoids from invading the Earth.

The Krynoids were created by writer Robert Banks Stewart. Stewart had come up with the idea of an alien plant sprouting from a human and growing massive. Originally called "Crinoid", the alien was characterised as not being necessarily evil, but instead living out its biological function. The Krynoid seeds were portrayed by a prop, but subsequent mutations as the Krynoid took over humans were accomplished via makeup work on actors. The fully mutated humanoid Krynoid uses a repainted Axon costume from 1971's The Claws of Axos. A larger Krynoid prop was constructed for depicting its form once it was no longer humanoid, which was considered similar to a "walking tent" and handled by two operators inside while two extras propelled it. Scenes depicting the Krynoid attacking a mansion were done utilising model work, with a Krynoid prop destroying a scale model of the mansion.

The Krynoids were later the focus of a 1999 audio drama series produced by Big Finish Productions, and also later appeared in the 2009 audio drama Hothouse, and Krynoids again appeared in the 2023 audio drama The Green Man, which depicts the character Jamie McCrimmon fighting a Krynoid. Another Krynoid audio drama spin-off series, dubbed Planet Krynoid, was announced in 2024, and depicts a "paradise planet" being infested by Krynoids. A Krynoid appears in the 1998 short story Stop the Pigeon, and another Krynoid appears in the 2014 short story collection Tales of Trenzalore, which depicts the Eleventh Doctor fighting one while defending the planet Trenzalore from a siege of numerous alien monsters.

=== Sandminer Robot ===
In The Robots of Death (1977), several different types of robots act as slave labour aboard a "sandminer", a type of mining vessel. In the society the sandminer hails from, the rich use the Robots for manual labour, and are stated to be so dependent on this labour they would die if the Robots were to stop. These Robots come in three different classes: "Dums", who are mute, Vocs, and Super Vocs. The Robots have begun to kill humans on-board, leading to the Fourth Doctor investigating. He discovers the Robots have been re-programmed by a man named Taren Kapel, who was raised by the Robots and believes that they should rise up against humanity and kill them. Kapel is eventually killed, and the Doctor is able to disable the "lead robot", whose deactivation causes the other Robots to stop killing.

Producer Philip Hinchcliffe and script editor Robert Holmes wanted a story featuring robots for the show's 1977 season, with Hinchcliffe wanting the robots to be from a society in which humanity has grown dependent on them. Holmes in particular sought a story featuring them in a confined environment to serve as a cost-saving measure. Writer Chris Boucher wished to explore the robots and their role in society, and came up with the sandminer environment as a result of Holmes's wish for a confined environment. The serial's visual identity was decided to resemble the Art Deco style, resulting in the Robots being designed to be "pleasing" for the eye.

Following their appearance in the television series, the Robots appear in several pieces of spin-off media. They appear in the 1999 novel Corpse Marker, which acts as a sequel to the original television serial. They subsequently appear in the Kaldor City audio series and in the 2011 audio drama Robophobia, in which the Seventh Doctor encounters several of the Robots again. Another audio drama series, The Robots, depicts the Robots on Kaldor City as technology continues to advance.

=== Guardian ===
The Guardians are a pair of powerful entities in charge of keeping balance in the universe, first seen in The Ribos Operation (1978), where the White Guardian appeared before the Doctor and asked him to re-assemble The Key to Time, warning them of the Black Guardian who also wished to obtain the Key. The White Guardian was later revealed to actually be the Black Guardian in disguise, with the Guardian attempting to trick the Doctor into assembling the Key for him. The Doctor is able to disperse the Key and evade the Black Guardian's attempts to track him down by randomising where the TARDIS landed. The Black Guardian later appeared in several serials where, seeking revenge, he attempted to manipulate Vislor Turlough into killing the Fifth Doctor. Both Guardians later appeared in 1983's Enlightenment, where the Guardians offered a crystal of great power to the winner of a race. Being offered the choice to kill or join the Doctor, Turlough threw the crystal at the Black Guardian, causing him to dissipate.

The Guardians were introduced during the series' "Key to Time" arc. Symbolising good and evil, the pair were characterised as being god-like figures that represented a black and white, good and evil conflict in the universe. Originally, a plan for the arc's end was to have the White Guardian be just as evil as the Black Guardian and have the Doctor confront him, though this was scrapped. The Black Guardian's eventual return was done as part of a trilogy of stories during the show's twentieth season focused on Turlough, with the Guardian's manipulation of the character being inspired by the idea of a companion secretly being there to kill the Doctor. The White Guardian was portrayed by actor Cyril Luckham in The Ribos Operation and Enlightenment and briefly by Valentine Dyall in The Armageddon Factor. Dyall portrays the Black Guardian in subsequent appearances of the character.

The Black Guardian subsequently appeared in several audio dramas, including 2009's The Judgement of Isskar, and 2016's Casualties of Time, and Gardens of the Dead, while the White Guardian appeared in the 2009 drama The Destroyer of Delights. Both appeared in the 2009 drama The Chaos Pool. The Black Guardian appears as the antagonist in the 1997 novel The Well-Mannered War and the 1993 comic Time & Time Again, with the White Guardian also appearing as a supporting character. The 1998 comic story Happy Deathday depicts another Guardian, dubbed the Beige Guardian, attempting to kill the first eight incarnations of the Doctor, but is later revealed to actually be a character in a video game being played by the Eighth Doctor's companion Izzy Sinclair.

=== The Mara ===
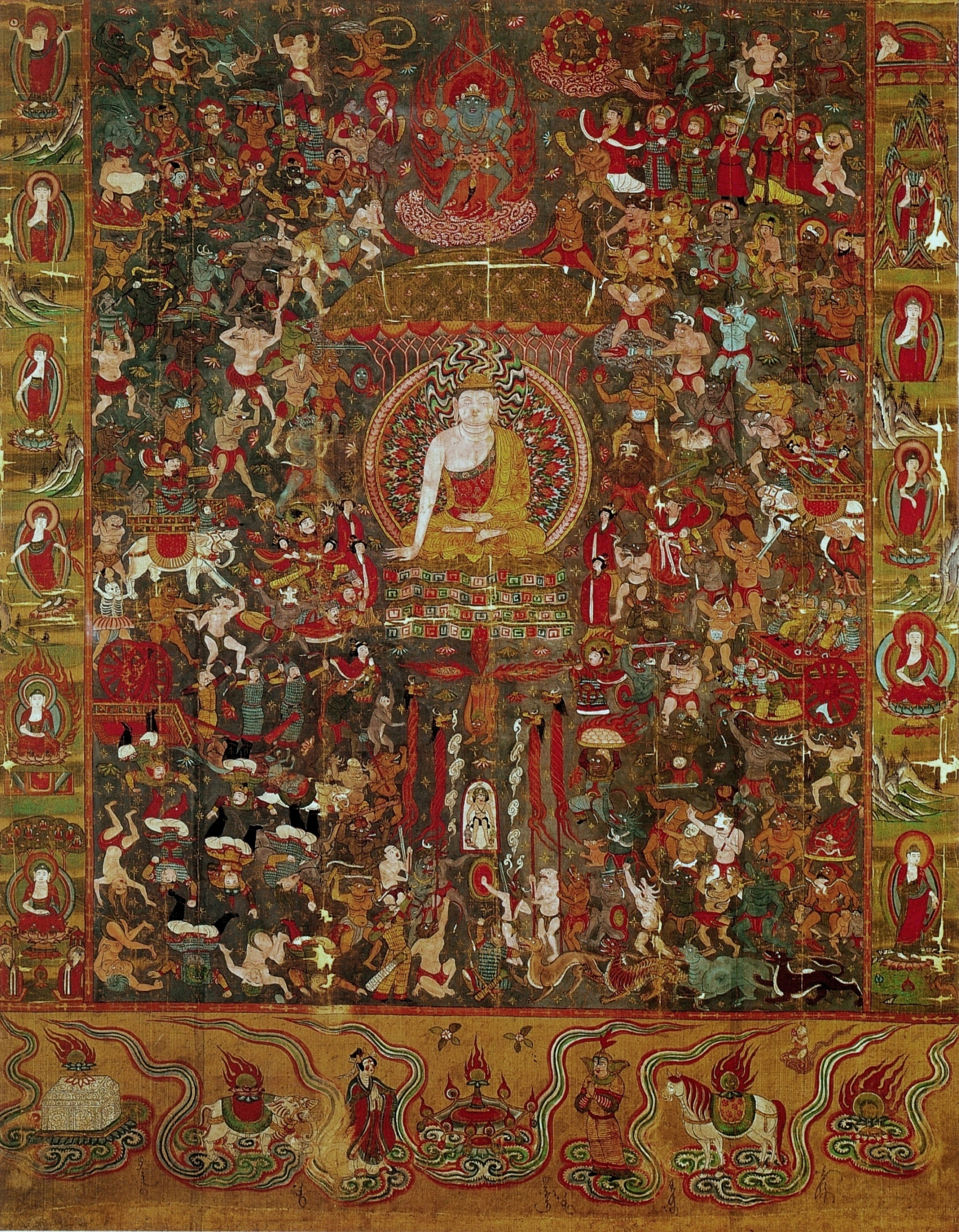
The demon Mara, alongside his daughters and army, as seen in an artistic depiction, attempting to tempt the Buddha. Mara was used as the namesake for Doctor Who's Mara.

The Mara is a gestalt entity that preys upon beings via their dreams. It first appears in the 1982 serial Kinda. It is non-corporeal, and dwells within a realm known as "The Dark Places of the Inside", having been created through the darkness present in the hearts of humans. Bound to existing outside the universe, the Mara frequently attempts to possess others to escape its prison, and often utilises the form of a snake while manifesting. In Kinda, the Mara enters the dreams of the Fifth Doctor's companion Tegan Jovanka, and from there attempts to stir up discontent among the locals of the planet Deva Loka before the Doctor is able to drive it away by forcing it into a circle of mirrors. The Mara subsequently appears in 1983's Snakedance, where the Mara possesses Tegan in order to go to the planet Manussa and obtain a crystal that allowed the Mara to manifest physically, though this plan is thwarted by the Doctor once again.

The scripts for both Kinda and Snakedance were written by Christopher Bailey. When initially writing Kinda, Bailey was studying concepts pertaining to Buddhism, which influenced large aspects of the script; similarly, other elements from other religious works were included as inspiration. The Mara's name was taken from Mara, a demon which tempted The Buddha in Buddhist mythology. According to Bailey, the Mara was originally conceived of as an aspect of Tegan's character, and the Mara was characterised as an ambivalent figure, with the Mara taking on a different form depending on the host. As development progressed, the Mara slowly evolved into a more villainous figure, which Bailey equivalated to the Christian Devil more than the original Buddhist ideas he had aimed for. The Mara was portrayed by physical giant snake props in its appearances, though later releases of Kinda depicted the Mara with computer-generated imagery.

=== Eternal ===
The Eternals are a race of powerful beings first introduced in Enlightenment (1983). The Eternals live outside time, and have the ability to manipulate matter and create objects from nothing. They manipulate "Ephemerals" (their word for mortal beings) for fun. In Enlightenment, the Fifth Doctor ended up encountering a group of Eternals, who sought to win the "Enlightenment" from the Black and White Guardians in a competition between themselves. Fighting a group of antagonist Eternals in the competition, the Doctor was able to prevent the Eternals from winning Enlightenment. Though the Eternals were referenced in the show's 2005 revival, they did not re-appear physically until "Can You Hear Me?" (2020), in which a pair named Zellin and Rakaya appear as the primary antagonists. Wishing to siphon nightmares in order to feed on them, they are tricked and imprisoned by the Thirteenth Doctor.

The Eternals were created by writer Barbara Clegg. The Eternals' "detached" personality was based on Clegg's observation of her rich family members' response to other members of the family, which she characterised as if they were playing with "lesser beings". Many of the actors for the Eternals were cast for being able to give a "detached" performance. In "Can You Hear Me?", Zellin and Rakaya are portrayed by Ian Gelder and Clare-Hope Ashitey, respectively.

An Eternal, who acts as a personification of Death, is introduced in the 1991 novel Timewyrm: Revelation. She subsequently appears in the 1992 novel Love and War, the 1998 novel Happy Endings, the 2003 audio drama Master. Death's siblings, who act as personifications of pain and time, appear in the 1995 novel Set Piece. Other Eternals appear in the 1994 comic Uninvited Guest, which depicts a group of them playing games with a planet which resulted in the planet's destruction. The Seventh Doctor arrives and strips away their immortality as punishment. Another group appears in the Bernice Summerfield 2005 audio drama Professor Bernice Summerfield and the Heart's Desire, which depicts a pair of Eternals having obtained a shard of Enlightenment to use for their games, only to be stopped by Bernice, who strips them of their immortality and throws the shard into space.

=== Mentor ===
Mentors are slug-like capitalists who first appear in the serial Vengeance on Varos (1985). A Mentor named Sil attempts to oust the governor of the planet Varos in order to obtain a material named Zytton, which he can then sell at low prices for a profit. Sil failed thanks to the Sixth Doctor's efforts, and later returns to Thoros-Beta, the home planet of the Mentors. He re-appears in 1986's Mindwarp, where Sil aids in capturing the Doctor's companion Peri so her body can be used to house the mind of the dying Mentor leader Kiv.

Created by writer Phillip Martin, Sil was originally developed as an aquatic creature, done to address the idea that such creatures did not feature often in science-fiction media. His name was derived from the Silurian era. Sil is portrayed by actor Nabil Shaban in his television appearances. Sil's popularity in his debut serial, credited by literary critic John Kenneth Muir as being largely due to Shaban's performance, allowed for a return to the character in Mindwarp. Sil's return resulted in Martin electing to visit Thoros-Beta, Sil's home planet. Thoros-Beta was conceived as having no natural resources, and to convey Martin's fear of rampant capitalism, the Mentors, Sil's race, were made to survive solely by investment of dubious nature. Also having concerns about genetic engineering, Martin made it so the Mentors had a heavy emphasis on them as a race that survived solely by mutation and augmentation.

Sil later appeared in the 2014 audio drama Antidote to Oblivion, in which he attempts to trick a future bankrupt Britain as part of a plan of his. A spin-off film starring Sil, named Sil and the Devil Seeds of Arodor, was released by Reeltime Pictures in 2019. The film depicts Sil attempting to escape from being found guilty after being put on trial.

=== Death's Head ===
Death's Head is a fictional mercenary appearing in comic books published by Marvel Comics. Debuting in a 1987 issue of Marvel UK's The Transformers series, the character was also used in Marvel UK's Doctor Who Magazine publications.

In the comics, Death's Head enters the Doctor Who universe after battling against the Decepticons in the Transformers series. He falls into a time portal before landing in the year 8162 and battling the Seventh Doctor. The Doctor shrinks Death's Head down to the size of a human before dropping him off on the Earth of the Dragon's Claws series in the Marvel Universe. Later, Death's Head is hired by the villain Josiah W. Dogbolter to hunt down and kill the Doctor. Dogbolter equips Death's Head with a time machine to find his target, although the Doctor realizes that the time machine is also a bomb, as Dogbolter plans to kill Death's Head as well. The Doctor and Death's Head work together and succeeded in removing the bomb and destroying Dogbolter's lair, after which point the Doctor dumps Death's Head on top of the Baxter Building, the headquarters of the Fantastic Four.

== Introduced from 2005–present ==
=== Raxacoricofallapatorian ===
The Raxacoricofallapatorians first appeared in the 2005 episodes "Aliens of London" and "World War Three", which feature a criminal family of them named the Slitheen. The Slitheen are capable of disguising themselves as humans via skin suits, but the process causes a buildup of "gas exchange", causing the Slitheen to fart while in disguise. The Slitheen are susceptible to vinegar due to being calcium-based lifeforms, causing them to explode on contact with vinegar. The Slitheen re-appear in the 2005 episode "Boom Town", which focuses on a member of the family named Blon Fel-Fotch Pasameer-Day Slitheen, and in Doctor Who spin-off series The Sarah Jane Adventures. Another family of Raxacoricofallapatorians, named the Blathereen, appear in the book The Monsters Inside and in The Sarah Jane Adventures.

While writing "Aliens of London" and "World War Three", writer Russell T Davies wished to incorporate the idea of an alien crime family, leading to the creation of the Slitheen. The subsequent visual design was created by design company Millenium FX, based on some of Davies's notes. The performance of Annette Badland, who portrayed Blon Fel-Fotch Pasameer-Day, impressed Davies while filming the episode, resulting in him deciding to bring Badland back for the episode "Boom Town". The Sarah Jane Adventures was pitched with the idea of "Sarah Jane versus the Slitheen." The Slitheen had several assets considered desirable by the production team, such as popularity with Doctor Who viewers, which allowed viewers of the main show to be brought into the new spin-off series. The Slitheen subsequently became major recurring antagonists within the series.

=== Graske ===
The Graske are a race of diminutive aliens that first appeared in the interactive Doctor Who mini-episode "Attack of the Graske" (2005). They infiltrate planets by subtly replacing members of the planet's species with disguised Graske. A Graske named Krislok appears in The Sarah Jane Adventures stories "Whatever Happened to Sarah Jane?" (2007) and "The Temptation of Sarah Jane Smith" (2008). Originally a henchman and slave of the Trickster, who saved him from death, Krislok later gains his freedom. An unnamed Graske appears in a mini-episode titled "Music of the Spheres" (2008). A Graske appears in the 2015 spin-off short story The Pest of Paternoster Row, where the Paternoster Gang fight a Graske. A similar, albeit blue, species known as the Groske appear in 2010 The Sarah Jane Adventures episode "Death of the Doctor".

=== Sycorax ===
The Sycorax first appeared in the debut Tenth Doctor story "The Christmas Invasion" (2005). The Sycorax are a warrior-like, hostile race, wearing skull-like masks and using a "laser-lash" item as weapons. They use a method known as "blood control" to control the minds of all people on Earth with a designated blood type, which they threaten to use to make all they control jump off buildings to kill themselves. The blood control is not able to do this, however, and it is merely a trick to make Earth officials surrender the planet to them. The plan is stopped by the Tenth Doctor, who defeats the Sycorax leader in a sword fight and forces them to stay away from the planet. Their ship is destroyed as they are leaving by Prime Minister Harriet Jones. Subsequently, Sycorax make cameo appearances in the episodes "The Pandorica Opens" (2010), "The Magician's Apprentice" (2015), and "Revolution of the Daleks" (2021).

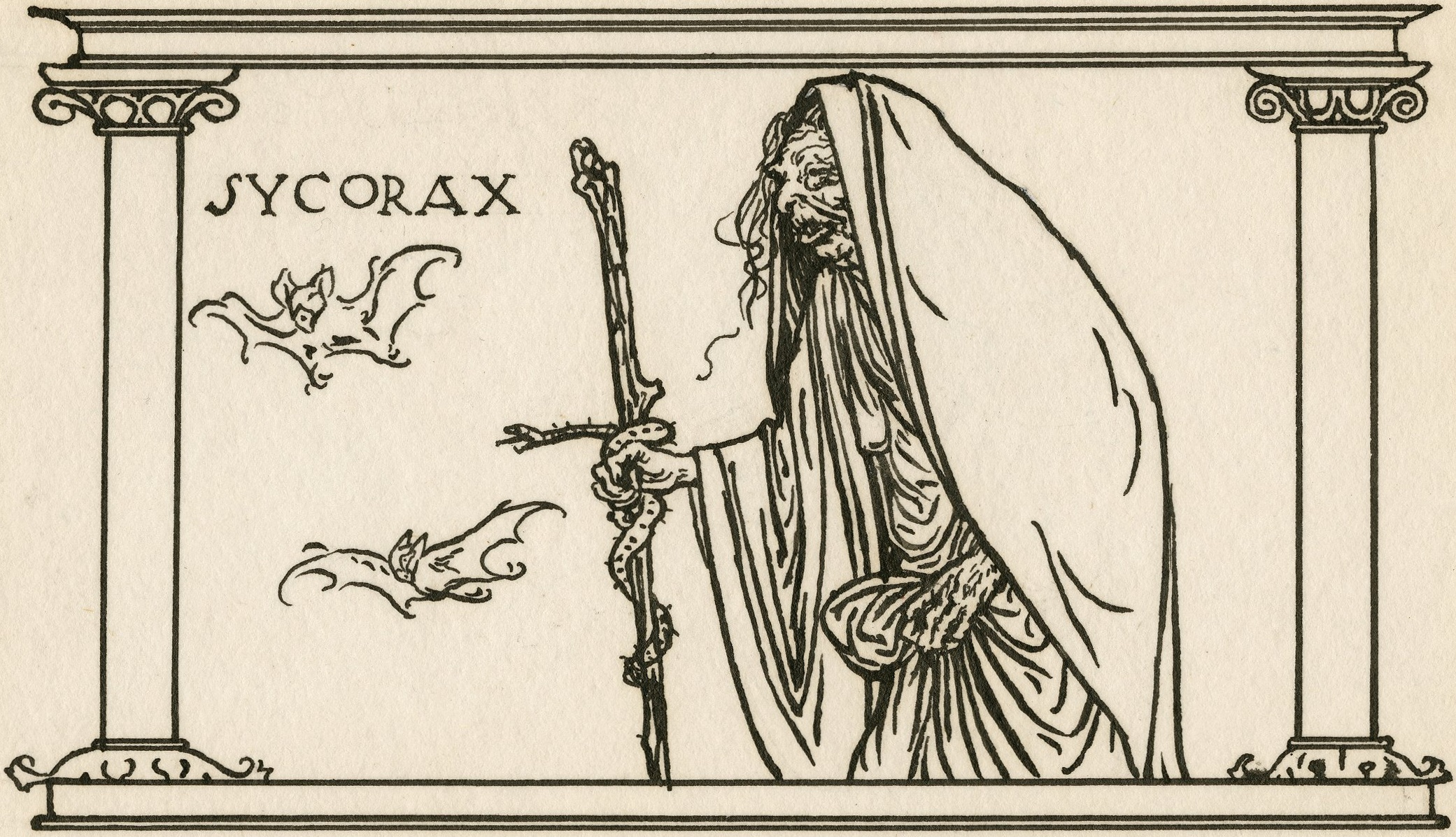
An illustration of the Shakespearean character Sycorax, after whom the Sycorax were named

The Sycorax were created because episode writer Russell T Davies wanted an alien with a convincing prosthetic face that utilised the actor's eyes and mouth; this had not been attempted previously in the show's revival. The name of the species hails from the character Sycorax from William Shakespeare's play The Tempest. For a plot point in the episode in which the characters are unable to translate the Sycorax's language to English, Davies devised an entire language for the Sycorax to speak. The Sycorax's robes were inspired by Masai warriors, with the Sycorax's skull-like helmets, which Davies wanted the audience to assume were the Sycorax's actual faces, inspired by the character Kurgan's helmet in the 1986 film Highlander.

A Sycorax appears in the 2008 comic Agent Provocateur, where the Tenth Doctor and his companion Martha Jones fight a Sycorax and defeat it. The Sycorax appear in another 2008 comic titled The Widow's Curse, where the wives of the Sycorax who invaded Earth previously attempt to get revenge for the deaths of their husbands. 2017 comic series Ghost Stories depicts the Twelfth Doctor and superhero the Ghost fighting a Sycorax named Kraxnor, who attempts to create a rift in the universe by sacrificing multiple planets in order to stop the spread of "dark energy". The 2023 comic Into Control sees the Fourteenth Doctor fighting the Sycorax Queen. The Seventh Doctor faces the Sycorax in the 2016 audio Harvest of the Sycorax, where he has to stop their efforts to take control of a space station that contains blood samples taken from the entire human race of the far future. The Sycorax appear in the 2018 short story Red Planet, where they capture an Ice Warrior and force it into combat in an arena. The Sycorax end up facing the Fourth Doctor in combat. The Sycorax also appear in the 2010 Choose Your Own Adventure book The Coldest War.

==== Roboforms ====
A group of robots, referred to as "pilot fish" and Roboforms, act as scavengers. They appeared shortly before the Sycorax's invasion, attempting to capture the Doctor so they could use his regeneration energy to power their ships. Disguising themselves as Santa Claus and using a robotic killer Christmas tree, they are stopped by the Tenth Doctor. These robots were later used as servants by the Racnoss in the episode "The Runaway Bride" (2006), and appeared in "The Pandorica Opens" (2010) as part of an alliance of alien species working to imprison the Eleventh Doctor. They also appear in the 2011 spin-off comic Silent Knight, where the Eleventh Doctor stops them from interfering with the real Santa's deliveries of presents around the world.

=== Catkind ===
The Catkind are felines humanoids that first appear the 2006 episode "New Earth". In "New Earth", a group of Catkind called the Sisters of Plenitude run a hospital on the titular planet near the city of New New York, where they test on cloned human subjects by infecting them with every disease in order to concoct cures for them. The subjects later escape, infecting many in the hospital, including several of the Sisters. The Tenth Doctor develops a cure for the infected, and the Sisters are subsequently arrested for their experimentation. In "Gridlock" (2007), most of the city of New New York is killed by a plague. One of the Catkind, Thomas Kincade Brannigan, is trapped in the Motorway beneath the city, and is encountered by the Tenth Doctor while he is trying to reunite with his companion Martha Jones. A surviving member of the Sisters of Plentitude, Novice Hame, also appears. Hame survived the plague via the protection of character the Face of Boe, and she aids the Tenth Doctor in opening the Motorway, allowing those trapped to escape.

The Catkind were conceived as cats that had evolved into a humanoid form, which episode writer Russell T Davies did so the visual effects looked convincing. This allowed the visual effects team to use prosthetics for their visual designs instead of using costumes, which they felt looked better than costumes. Davies enjoyed Anna Hope's performance as Hame, and thus sought to bring her back for "Gridlock", where she was redeemed as a character following her role in "New Earth". As only female Catkind had been seen previously, Davies wished to include a male Catkind, which resulted in the character of Brannigan being added to the story.

Hame later appeared in the 2018 audio drama series Tales from New Earth, which depicts her attempting to rebuild New Earth society after the events of "Gridlock", with Hope reprising her role as Hame. A short scene, titled "The Secret of Novice Hame" was released as part of a tie-in with a watch-along for "New Earth" held during the COVID-19 pandemic in 2020. The scene features Hame on her deathbed in the far future as she awaits the Doctor's arrival. Hope reprised her role in the scene. Catkind appear in the 2008 comic Agent Provacateur, while a Sister of Plenitude appears in the 2016 short story Fairy Tale of New New York.

=== Krillitane ===
The Krillitanes are a race who take attributes from other races to change their appearance. They first appear in the episode "School Reunion" (2006), where they attempt to crack the "Skasis Paradigm", a theory of everything, by using "Krillitane Oil" to improve the intelligence of a group of primary school children. They are destroyed by K9, who fires a laser at the Oil, which explodes and kills the Krillitane. Actor Anthony Head portrays the Krillitanes' leader, Brother Lassar. The Krillitanes were created by the episode's writer, Toby Whithouse. During development of the episode, the Krillitane were originally named Krillians, but were re-named due to the name already being taken by a computer company. Though the final Krillitane were portrayed entirely with computer generated imagery, it was originally planned for the human actors to have wings and have them fly through the school. This was deemed impractical, leading to the CGI Krillitanes' usage instead.

The Krillitane appear in the 2009 novel The Krillitane Storm, where they appear in medieval England, and 2010 novel Code of the Krillitanes, which sees the Krillitanes using crisps to make humans more intelligent, attempting to hijack the internet for their plan. The Krillitane appear in the 2025 audio drama The Krillitane Feint, where a military outpost on another planet is experimenting on and attacked by Krillitanes, who have taken the forms of several humans as well the Second Doctor and his companions. These Krillitane attack and kill nearly everyone in the base except one, who sets the base's reactor to explode to take out the Krillitanes and prevent them from reaching Earth. In later 2025 audio drama The Krillitane Relic, a Krillitane from the military outpost was revealed to have survived, and aids a group of Krillitane in infiltrating a human space outpost. This Krillitane is killed by the others, and the Seventh Doctor kills the remaining Krillitane. A Krillitane appears in 2018 short story The Heist, where it aids in infiltrating an alien market, and another appears in the 2015 short story The Gingerbread Trap, where a pair of children encounter one disguised as an old woman, who they are able to defeat. The Krillitane also appear in the 2009 comic story Fugitive, where an alien shapeshifter, pretending to be Lassar, puts the Doctor on trial. Lassar's impostor attempts to take control of intergalactic law body the Shadow Proclamation with the help of the Krillitane and some rogue Judoon, but is thwarted by the Doctor with help from the Ogrons, Sontarans, and Draconians.

=== Clockwork Droid ===
The Clockwork Droids are a type of robot that first appear in the 2006 episode "The Girl in the Fireplace". When the spaceship "Madame de Pompadour" carrying them is hit by an ion storm in deep space, the Droids become confused and believe they need to capture the real Madame de Pompadour to repair the vessel. Travelling back in time to capture her, they are thwarted by the Tenth Doctor. The Clockwork Droids re-appeared in the 2014 episode "Deep Breath". Another group of them crashed on Earth in the Victorian era and attempted to use human body parts to not only disguise themselves but also repair their ship, hiding their actions by disguising their murders as spontaneous combustion. These Droids sought to reach the "Promised Land", and were led by a Droid dubbed "The Half-Faced Man". The newly regenerated Twelfth Doctor thwarts their scheme when the Half-Faced Man is killed.

Episode writer Steven Moffat was pitched the idea of Pompadour and a "clockwork man" by showrunner Russell T Davies during production of the revival's second series. The Droids were inspired by the Mechanical Turk, and were used as a "scary" element to draw younger viewers into the story, as the sound of a ticking clock present with the Droids exploited a childhood fear not yet done on the programme before. They were originally planned to have shadowy faces, obscured by their wig, but due to complications involving camera angles, the Droids were given carnival masks to wear to cover their faces instead. The Droids' return in "Deep Breath" was done to provide a simple enemy for the episode, allowing the episode to focus on the Twelfth Doctor and Clara Oswald's relationship.

The Clockwork Droids appear in spin-off media, with one Clockwork Droid appearing in the 2009 comic strip The Forgotten, where it is created out of the Doctor's memories and used to attack him. The Droids also appear in the 2024 audio drama The Queen of Clocks.

=== Ood ===
The Ood are a species that debuted in the 2006 two-part story "The Impossible Planet" and "The Satan Pit". In the show's universe, the Ood are a peaceful race that hail from a planet known as the Ood-Sphere. They have three brains: one in their head, a hindbrain they hold in their hands, and one large brain-like entity that connects the Ood psychically like a hivemind. The Ood were enslaved as a slave race by the company Ood Operations, with propaganda created by the company telling those who purchased Ood that the Ood enjoyed their work, and that their status as slaves was how their species functioned. The Ood's hindbrains were cut off and replaced by an orb that translates what they say. The collective brain was sealed within a dampening field, which, combined with the hindbrain's disconnection, effectively lobotomised the Ood. The Ood are mistreated by those who own them, with scanners in one story considering Ood akin to "livestock" and not considering them proper lifeforms. Though most accept the Ood's slavery as a fact of life, a group known as "Friends of the Ood" seeks to free the Ood from slavery, though they are not considered very influential as an organisation. The Ood are eventually freed from slavery during the events of the 2008 episode "Planet of the Ood".

Originally, the Ood's role as servants was planned to be taken on by the Slitheen, but this was scrapped, with Davies electing to make a new alien species, the creation of which would cost the same as refurbishing the pre-existing Slitheen costumes. They were named "Ood" in order to give them a simple name. Their popularity with both the production team and audiences resulted in a further return in the 2008 episode "Planet of the Ood", which explored more of the Ood's backstory and history in the show's universe.

=== Weevil ===
Weevils are aggressive, bipedal aliens with piranha-like faces that appear in spin-off show Torchwood. Weevils first appear in the episode "Everything Changes" (2006). Weevils then appear in "Combat" (2007), where the titular team visit an underground Weevil smuggling ring, where Weevils are often abused and used by the wealthy elite to kill those they do not like. An underground Weevil fight club, where people can fight Weevils in one on one combat, is also shown, with the Torchwood Institute dismantling it. They appear briefly in the episodes "Reset" (2008) where the titular team is shown chasing down Weevils in the episode's opener, "Dead Man Walking" (2008), where a group of them live in an abandoned church and are used to detect a mysterious artifact hidden in the church's walls, and "Exit Wounds" (2008), where a number of Weevils are released into Cardiff to wreak havoc. Weevils cameo in the Doctor Who episode "The Pandorica Opens" (2010).

The original concept for Weevils was for them to resemble a "cross between a vicious dog and an ape." They were designed to have a mix of bestiality and intelligence, so that the Weevils looked truly lifelike despite their costumes being performed using different masks. The first mask is an animatronic head, which can make detailed facial expressions and is used primarily for close-up shots of Weevils, while the other main head used has a wire system that lets the actor open the Weevil's jaw so it can snarl.

=== Bane ===
The Bane are a cyclopic, tentacled race that appear in spin-off television series The Sarah Jane Adventures. The Bane first appear in 2007's "Invasion of The Bane". The Bane are led by the Bane Mother, a massive creature who serves as a matriarchal figure to all Bane. A Bane who takes on a human form known as Mrs. Wormwood heads up a company called "Bubble Shock", which attempts to put a mind-controlling agent in their titular soda so humanity will serve the Bane. Bubble Shock is popular with all but 2% of the world, leading to them creating a cloned human known as "The Archetype" to determine how they can alter Bubble Shock so it will affect all of humanity. The Bane are defeated by Sarah Jane Smith, and the Archetype, named Luke Smith, is adopted by her as a son. Wormwood later returns in 2008's Enemy of the Bane, where she is now a fugitive of the Bane. Wormwood attempts to obtain a device known as the Tunguska Scroll to rule the universe, hoping to also recruit Luke to her side and have him rule alongside her, though her plans are thwarted. Big Finish audio drama series Rani Takes on the World features Wormwood and the Bane in several audio dramas set after the events of Enemy of the Bane.

=== Judoon ===
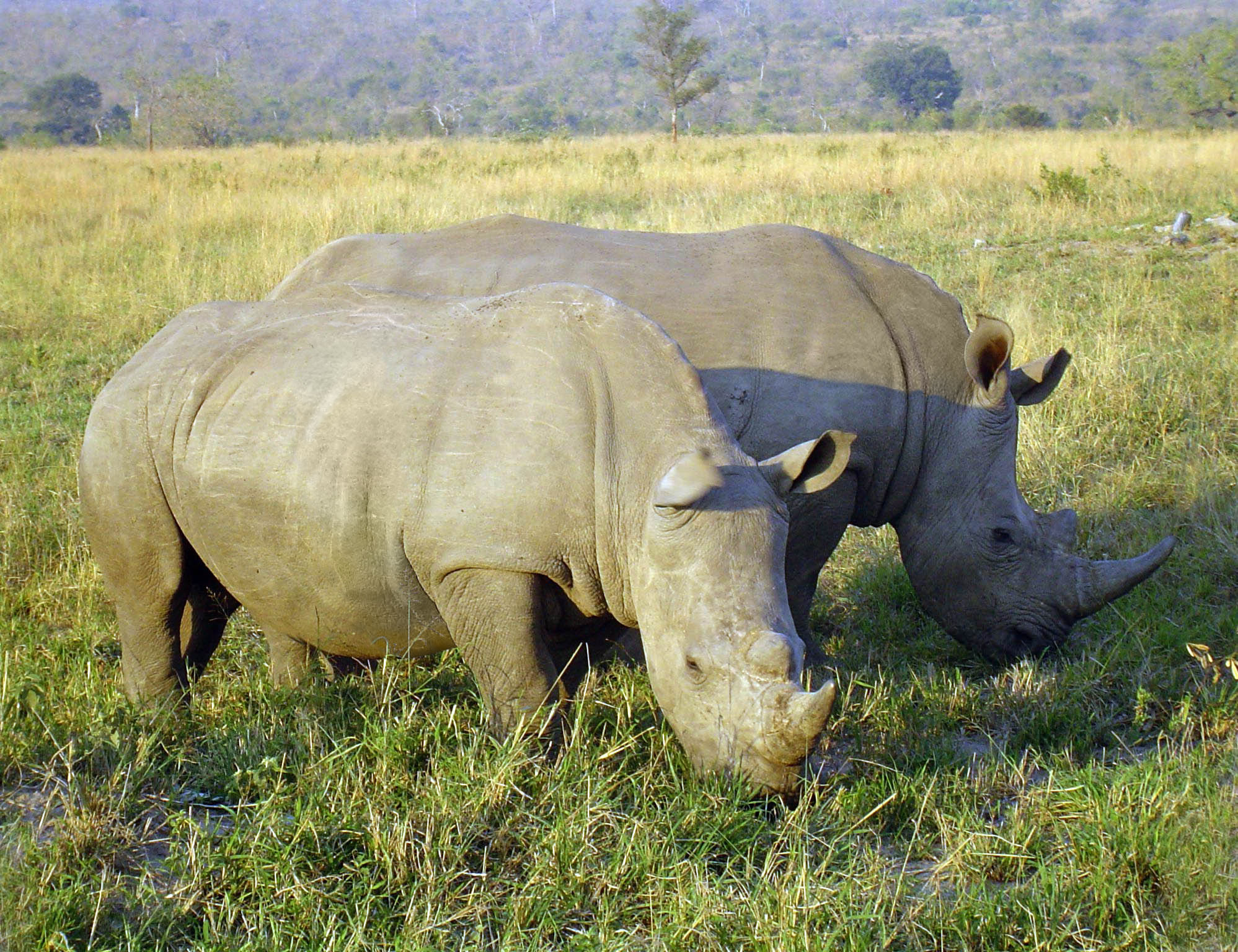
The Judoon physically resemble rhinoceroses (pictured)

The Judoon are a galactic alien police force resembling rhinoceroses who recur throughout the series. The Judoon are blunt in their applications of laws, with the Tenth Doctor describing the Judoon as "interplanetary thugs" due to their methods. The Judoon use energy weapons to incarcerate prisoners, and can breathe for some time in space due to their powerful lungs. They first appear in "Smith and Jones" (2007), where they seek to capture an alien fugitive by transporting an Earth hospital onto the Moon. They later re-appear in "The Stolen Earth" (2008) where they aid the Shadow Proclamation, an inter-galactic body of law, and later make cameo appearances in other episodes of the series. They also appear in The Sarah Jane Adventures story Prisoner of the Judoon (2009). The Judoon re-appear in the 2020 episode "Fugitive of the Judoon," where they attempt to find and arrest the Fugitive Doctor, who is hiding out in Gloucester, and re-appear in 2020 episode "The Timeless Children", where a group of them appear and imprison the Thirteenth Doctor at the end of the episode.

The Judoon's heads were portrayed physically via an animatronic mask, though to keep production costs down, only one had their helmet off, with all other Judoon keeping their helmets on. Though portrayed by numerous actors, Nicholas Briggs provides the voice for the Judoon. The Judoon were originally planned to appear in the 2007 episode "Voyage of the Damned", where the Judoon would have appeared at the end of the episode. Another scrapped appearance was in 2008 episode "Journey's End", where Donna Noble and a copy of the Tenth Doctor would have returned to the Shadow Proclamation to gather Judoon ships to attack the Daleks.

The Judoon have appeared across numerous pieces of spin-off media for the series, including in books, comics, audio dramas, and video games.

=== Weeping Angel ===
The Weeping Angels are a race of aliens that feed off temporal energy. They obtain this energy by touching their victims and sending them back in time, feeding on the energy caused by the resultant time travel. The Angels resemble statues due to being "quantum-locked", which means they can only move when unobserved, and turn to stone when observed. They first appear in 2007's "Blink", where they are shown attempting to capture the Doctor's TARDIS and harness its time energy. They are defeated by the characters Sally Sparrow and Larry Nightingale, who, when retrieving the TARDIS for the Doctor, accidentally trick them into staring at each other, trapping them forever. The Angels subsequently re-appear in several other episodes in the series. They also briefly appear at the end of spin-off series Class, and were planned to appear as the main antagonists of its second series before being cancelled.

The Weeping Angels were created by writer Steven Moffat. Moffat gained the inspiration for the Angels while on a holiday in Dorset. While exploring, he entered a graveyard marked as being unsafe and found a statue of an angel weeping. He returned years later with his son, but could not find the angel, nor any evidence that it had been there before. Though Moffat attempted further research into the statue in the years after the Weeping Angels appeared on-screen, their popularity made this much more difficult. Moffat was inspired by other sources, such as Heisenberg's Uncertainty Principle, which states that observation can affect the results of an experiment, as well as the concept of children covering their eyes when seeing something scary.

=== The Trickster ===
The Trickster is an entity who appears in the spin-off series The Sarah Jane Adventures, serving as its main antagonist. The Trickster is a god-like being and a member of the Pantheon of Discord (see below). He attempts to make bargains that change history, with the Trickster feeding on the resultant chaos of the change. The Trickster appears in the 2007 serial Whatever Happened to Sarah Jane?, which sees the Trickster make a bargain with a childhood friend of Sarah Jane's who died in the past; this bargain sees Sarah Jane die in her place. The Trickster is eventually thwarted due to memories of Sarah Jane persisting, as well as Sarah Jane's friend reneging on the deal. He later re-appears in 2008's The Temptation of Sarah Jane Smith, where he sends Sarah Jane back in time to seek the truth of why her parents abandoned her when she was young; however, this is a plan by the Trickster to defeat Sarah Jane. Her parents end up sacrificing themselves in order to stop the Trickster's plan. The Trickster appears in the 2009 serial The Wedding of Sarah Jane Smith, where he attempts to force Sarah Jane Smith to marry a man in order to accomplish one of his schemes, though his plan is thwarted when the man turns against the Trickster.

Servants of the Trickster appear in both Doctor Who and Torchwood as antagonists. One of these is the Time Beetle, a creature that appears in the 2008 Doctor Who episode "Turn Left". The Beetle can cling onto the backs of people, allowing the Beetle to alter their past and change history.

==== The Pantheon ====
The Pantheon of Discord, also referred to as the Pantheon of Gods and the Gods of Chaos, are a group of transcendental, god-like beings. Their main goal is to cause chaos and alter reality. The Pantheon of Discord was first mentioned in the 2009 The Sarah Jane Adventures serial The Wedding of Sarah Jane Smith, where they are associated with the Trickster, though the Pantheon primarily serve as recurring enemies of the Fifteenth Doctor. Several of their members are antagonists who have fought the Doctor in past incarnations. Members of the Pantheon include the Toymaker, Sutekh, the Mara, Maestro, Lux, a being who can control light that takes the form of cartoon character Mr. Ring-a-Ding who first appears in 2025's "Lux"; and Desiderium, a baby who can grant wishes that first appears in 2025's "Wish World".

=== Vashta Nerada ===
Vashta Nerada are small creatures that are referred to as "the shadows that melt the flesh". Present on most planets, they can be seen as dust particles in sunbeams. When hungry, they will latch onto a victim, keep them fresh, and then devour them, with the Vashta Nerada's presence being indicated by the appearance of a second shadow on the victim. They are described as the "piranhas of the air", able to strip their victims to the bone in an instant in high enough densities. They are able to control and manipulate the victims they consume. They first appear in two-part story "Silence in the Library" (2008) and "Forest of the Dead" (2008), where they appear on a planet-sized library. The library's books were constructed out of paper from the forests they hailed from, resulting in the Vashta Nerada swarming the library. This caused the library's computer to turn all of the visitors into data in order to save them from the swarms. The Tenth Doctor was able to make a truce with the Vashta Nerada, allowing the people to go in exchange for leaving the planet to the Vashta Nerada once they were gone. The Vashta Nerada were created by writer Steven Moffat, who wanted to create a monster out of the fear of the dark. Moffat was inspired by the idea of seeing shadows in the dark and believing it to be something moving.

The Vashta Nerada appear in the 2017 audio drama Night of the Vashta Nerada, which sees the Fourth Doctor visiting a theme park that has unleashed the local Vashta Nerada after the planet's forests were torn down to allow the park to be constructed. Subsequent 2017 drama Day of the Vashta Nerada pits the Eighth Doctor against genetically-altered Vashta Nerada that have been created as a new weapon in the Time War. They also appear in the 2023 audio drama series Shades of Fear, where they face off against the Ninth Doctor, and combine with a creature named the Vermine to create an entity called the Red Darkness, before being defeated. The 2-23 audio drama Operation Dusk depicts a group of Vashta Nerada attacking during the London Blitz. The Vashta Nerada appear in the 2010 video game Doctor Who: The Adventure Games in the fourth episode, "Shadows of the Vashta Nerada", which takes place in an underwater base overrun by Vashta Nerada. They also appear in the 2013 comic Space Oddity, where they attempt to devour the crew of Alexei Leonov's first spacewalk.

=== Midnight Entity ===
The Midnight Entity is the projected name given to a mysterious being encountered by the Doctor in the episode "Midnight" (2008). Apparently inhabiting the planet Midnight, the natural appearance of this organism is not directly known, only being referred to as a shadow. The creature was capable of possessing humans. First unable to move, it repeats what other people say, then begins saying what they are saying at the same time, then is capable of moving and taking over other people. It is seemingly killed when a stewardess throws the person it has possessed, Sky Silvestry, onto the planet's surface, resulting in both of them being disintegrated by the planet's natural radiation. The Entity re-appears in "The Well" (2025). Set on the planet Midnight hundreds of thousands of years after the events of its first appearance, the Entity apparently escaped from the titular well, which exists in a mining colony. The entire crew died to the Entity's games, leaving only Aliss, the crew's deaf cook, alive. The Entity attached to her, hiding behind her. When a team arrived to investigate what happened on the colony, the Entity killed anyone who walked directly behind Aliss, not wanting to be seen. After a stand-off, the Entity apparently grabs onto the Doctor's companion Belinda Chandra. Shaya, the group's leader, apparently forces the Entity onto her back and jumps back into the Well, seemingly defeating it. Despite this, the episode's ending implies the creature latched onto another soldier, allowing it to escape the planet.

Showrunner Russell T Davies had the idea of the Entity in his head for quite a while prior to its usage in "Midnight". The idea for the entity's usage of mimicry hailed from a conversation between Davies and producer Phil Collinson, in which the two accidentally kept repeating each other's words. Davies realised it could be used in a mocking manner, inspiring the usage in the final episode. The concept of communication as a major theme with the Entity was also inspired by the Star Trek: The Next Generation episode "Darmok", with Davies being inspired by the concept of communicating with a creature who spoke an incomprehensible language to such an extent that he avoided watching the episode to allow himself to develop the idea independently of it. "The Well" was originally intended to feature the Orishas, Nigerian spirits, as the primary antagonists instead of the Midnight Entity, but it was later converted into a sequel to "Midnight" after the writers felt the script was not treating the Orishas with an appropriate level of cultural respect. Davies felt like the actions in the script aligned with the behaviours of the Midnight Entity in its original appearance, so decided to rework the episode as a direct sequel.

=== Silent ===
The Silents are an alien race that were genetically engineered by the religious organisation known as The Church of the Papal Mainframe. The Silents are also sometimes referred to as the Silence, the same name as the organisation a group of Silents are associated with. The Silents first appear in the 2011 episode "The Impossible Astronaut", though they are mentioned repeatedly beforehand during the revival's fifth series. Silents are depicted as tall humanoids with bulbous heads and mouthless, bony faces. Silents can be perceived only while being viewed, and they are instantly forgotten once someone who views them looks away.

Silents, acting alongside the Silence, aim to kill the Doctor, which they repeatedly attempt to achieve throughout the revival's sixth series. They kidnap character River Song as an infant, grooming her as an assassin to kill the Doctor. Though River attempts to kill the Doctor in the 2011 episode "Let's Kill Hitler", she changes her mind. The Silence later capture her and imprison her in an astronaut suit during the events of "Closing Time" (2011), and in the subsequent episode, "The Wedding of River Song" (2011), she seemingly succeeds in shooting and killing the Doctor. It is revealed that the Doctor faked his death, however, allowing him to escape the Silence, who stopped hunting him as they assumed he had died.

Writer Steven Moffat created the Silents. Neill Gorton, a creature designer at studio Millenium FX, was involved with the Silents' design. The Silents were described as "looming" over characters in the script of their first appearance, with Gorton thus making them to be very tall. The Silents' very first mock-up design was quickly accepted by the show's producers, which Gorton attributed to be due to the script's detail allowing everyone to have a similar mental image. The visual appearance of the Silents was inspired by Edvard Munch's 1893 painting The Scream, the mythological figures known as "men in black", and the concept of grey aliens.

=== Tivolian ===
The Tivolians are a species that first appeared in "The God Complex" (2011). They are a cowardly race that live on Tivoli, the most invaded planet in the galaxy. As a result, many aspects of their culture and society are based around other species conquering them. "The God Complex" features a Tivolian named Gibbis, who is brought to an alien spaceship disguised as a 1980s Earth hotel. This ship houses a Minotaur who feasts on the belief of those brought to the ship. Another Tivolian, named Prentis, appears in the 2015 episode "Before the Flood"; Prentis is a funeral director, and arrived on Earth in 1980 to bury the Fisher King, a warlord who conquered Tivoli in the past. The Fisher King, who was actually not dead, killed him upon waking up.

Tivolians appear in 2022 spin-off audio drama The Tivolian Who Knew Too Much. One named Timble Feebis accidentally gained a valuable data chip from a Tivolian spy, which was wanted by Tivolian criminal mastermind Volen Steasel. Feebis helps stop Steasel, and subsequently becomes a secret agent.

=== Shadow Kin ===
The Shadow Kin are a species that serve as major antagonists in spin-off series Class. The Shadow Kin exist in shadows and can become corporeal to attack their enemies; prior to the events of the show, the Shadow Kin annihilated the Rhodian and Quill races, leading to the only survivors of both races being brought to Earth for safety by the Twelfth Doctor. The Shadow Kin and their leader, Corikinus, seek the Rhodian Cabinet of Souls, a box that contains the souls of 3 billion dead Rhodians that can be used as a weapon. Charlie, the only surviving Rhodian, brought the Cabinet with him, causing the Shadow Kin to follow the survivors to Earth. During the show's opener, "For Tonight We Might Die" (2016), a student of Coal Hill School, April, gets into an accident that has caused her heart to be shared between her and Corikinus, which will cause both to die if either does. The Doctor's arrival is able to force the Shadow Kin to retreat and be unable to return. Corikinus, in the episode "Co-Owner of a Lonely Heart" (2016) subsequently attempts to anchor their heart toward him, with both him and April affecting each other; Corikinus is affected emotionally by April while April gains the ability to harness shadowy blades. April attempts to kill Corikinus in the subsequent episode, "Brave-ish Heart" (2016), but spares him and becomes king of the Shadow Kin in his place. In the show's finale, "The Lost" (2016), the Shadow Kin betray April's command, and Corikinus attempts to capture her and invade the Earth. April, at her request, is killed by Charlie, killing Corikinus, but the Shadow Kin prepare a full invasion anyway, forcing Charlie to use the Cabinet to kill them all. Following the Cabinet's activation, April wakes up alive in Corikinus's body.

=== Harmony Shoal ===
The Harmony Shoal, also referred to as the Shoal of the Winter Harmony, are a group of brain-like creatures. They have the ability to take control of other creatures' bodies by replacing their brain with a member of the Shoal's. They first appeared in the 2015 Christmas special "The Husbands of River Song", which depicts the Shoal as one of many races that has been conquered by the tyrannical King Hydroflax. The Shoal wished to give him a diamond that the Twelfth Doctor's companion River Song had been trying to steal. The Shoal return in the 2016 Christmas special "The Return of Doctor Mysterio", where they attempt to infiltrate and take over the Earth. They are stopped by the Twelfth Doctor and a superhero named "The Ghost." At the end of the episode, one of the Shoal is revealed to have survived and taken over the body of a UNIT soldier, allowing it to escape.

The Shoal appear in 2016-2017 spin-off comic series Ghost Stories, which sees the Doctor and the Ghost teaming up to free a planet that has been conquered by the Shoal. They also appear in the 2024 audio drama Invasion of the Body Stealers, in which the Fourth Doctor stops a planetary invasion by the Harmony Shoal.

=== Stenza ===
The Stenza are a warrior race who first appear in the episode "The Woman Who Fell to Earth" (2018). The Stenza have, in the past, ravaged the populations of several planets. Those wishing to become leaders of their kind must go on a hunt, during which they pluck a tooth from their targeted victim and embed it into their face. "The Woman Who Fell to Earth" depicts a Stenza, named T'zim Sha (nicknamed Tim Shaw by the show's characters) engaging in a hunt on Earth, aiming to capture a human named Karl, though he is defeated by the Thirteenth Doctor. T'zim Sha later re-appeared in the episode "The Battle of Ranskoor Av Kolos" (2018), where it is revealed that he has obtained the aid of a race known as the Ux, whom he uses to shrink planets. T'zim Sha is defeated once again by the Doctor and her companions. The Stenza are mentioned in the 2018 episode "The Ghost Monument" as having been responsible for forcing scientists on the planet Desolation into creating many horrors that dwell on the planet's surface.

== Reception and analysis ==
Several writers have expressed that Doctor Who's monsters have been often portrayed as inhuman "Others". The book, Triumph of a Time Lord: Regenerating Doctor Who in the Twenty-First Century (2009) by Matt Hills, stated that the show's monsters were made to give child audiences a sense of control while still making them feel fear. Mark Brake, writing in The Science of Doctor Who (2021), stated that monster stories tended to be told from a human perspective, with stories often exploring themes of the "human and the nonhuman", with John Kenneth Muir in A Critical History of Doctor Who on Television (1999) stating that the show's early monster stories had monsters treated in "absolutes" and often saw little exploration of who the creatures were, being "non-human representations of absolute evil, they had to be eliminated before they could annihilate humanity". Danny Nichol's book Doctor Who: A British Alien? (2018) stated that there were many instances of the Doctor treating several aliens, such as the Macra and Silents, with genocide, with neither the show or other characters being critical of the Doctor's actions.

Critics have stated that the usage of monsters within the series can be seen as representing British cultural anxieties. The book Inside the TARDIS: The Worlds of Doctor Who (2006) by James Chapman stated that the show's increasing usage of monsters during the 1960s served to characterise them as Others, and that it reflected real-world anxieties regarding race and immigration at the time of the episodes' airing. As well as inflicting paranoia in audiences, the book also stated that alien invasions frequently taking place in the British mainland was reflective of British self-importance, as if aliens deemed Britain an important location in their invasion plans, then it maintained the idea that Britain was still a "great power". The book Aliens in Popular Culture (2019), edited by Michael M. Levy and Farah Mendlesohn, stated that the alien invasion narrative present in the series was a result of British cultural anxieties over the country's ability to defend itself, a narrative originally perpetuated by H. G. Wells' novel The War of the Worlds (1898). Various monsters introduced throughout the series were stated to represent different anxieties: Cybermen represent posthuman fears, Silurians and Zygons represent anxieties towards indigenous persons and refugees, respectively, and the Daleks represent anxieties present during the time of the Blitz.

Despite the "Othering" of the show's monsters, many writers have expressed that the show often gives significant depth to its monsters that defy the traditional trope of the "Other". Ivan Phillips' book Once Upon a Time Lord: The Myths and Stories of Doctor Who (2020) stated that the series' monsters tended not to fall within a strict sense of good or evil. Muir considered the era of the Third Doctor to be a period where the Doctor confronted his own prior misgivings toward non-human creatures in the series via his attempts at negotiation with the Silurians and the overcoming of his personal disdain towards the Ice Warriors. Triumph of a Time Lord: Regenerating Doctor Who in the Twenty-First Century stated that this defiance of usual tropes is also conveyed through the increased use of sympathetic antagonists in the show's revival, which help convey that many creatures that can seem scary often have reasons underpinning their motivations that the audience may not at first understand. Hills also stated that many of these monsters act as an evolution of conventional horror tropes in that many of the show's monsters fail to fall into established horror categories, conveying horror through methods other than usual tropes such as the usage of Other. Priya Dixit, writing in the academic journal International Studies Perspectives, stated that many monsters in the show, while characterised as "Others", were often given varying shades of humanity. While some aliens were considered threats that needed to be destroyed, many had different individual characters that could be related to and understood from different viewpoints, with many of these viewpoints often being marginalised in other science-fiction media. Aliens in Popular Culture stated that as sympathetic portrayals of returning monsters became more prevalent, the series was able to establish that there were "alternate responses to invasion and invasion anxiety".

== Bibliography ==
- Sleight, Graham (20 October 2012). The Doctor's Monsters: Meanings of the Monstrous in Doctor Who. I B Tauris. ISBN 978-1-84885-178-8.
- Phillips, Ivan (20 February 2020). Once Upon a Time Lord: The Myths and Stories of Doctor Who. Bloomsbury Publishing. ISBN 978-1-78831-645-3.
- Chapman, James (19 September 2006). Inside the TARDIS: The Worlds of Doctor Who. I B Tauris. ISBN 978-1-84511-163-2.
- Kenneth Muir, John (2007). A Critical History of Doctor Who on Television. McFarland Publishing. ISBN 978-0-7864-3716-0.
- Kistler, Alan (1 October 2013). Doctor Who: A History. Rowman & Littlefield. ISBN 978-1-4930-0016-6.
- Nicol, Danny (2018). Doctor Who: A British Alien?. Springer Nature. ISBN 978-3-319-65833-9.
- Frankel, Valerie Estelle (4 March 2018). Women in Doctor Who: Damsels, Feminists and Monsters. McFarland Publishing. ISBN 978-1-4766-3154-7.
- Gibson, Graham (6 May 2025). Doctor Who: A Cultural History. Bloomsbury Publishing. ISBN 979-8-8818-5613-7.
- Jowett, Lorna (30 June 2017). Dancing with the Doctor: Dimensions of Gender in the Doctor Who Universe. Bloomsbury Publishing. ISBN 978-1-78672-146-4.
- Layton, David (10 January 2014). The Humanism of Doctor Who: A Critical Study in Science Fiction and Philosophy. McFarland Publishing. ISBN 978-0-7864-8944-2.
- Parsons, Paul (2006). The Science of Doctor Who. Icon Books. ISBN 978-1-84046-737-6.
- Crome, Andrew; McGrath, James F (14 November 2013). Religion and Doctor Who: Time and Relative Dimensions in Faith. Wipf and Stock Publishers. ISBN 978-1-62564-377-3.

=== The Complete History ===
- Ainsworth, John (21 October 2015). Doctor Who: The Complete History: An Unearthly Child – The Daleks. Hachette Partworks, Panini Publishing. ISSN 2057-6048.
- Ainsworth, John (9 September 2015). Doctor Who: The Complete History: Gridlock – Daleks in Manhattan – Evolution of the Daleks – 42. Hachette Partworks, Panini Publishing. ISSN 2057-6048.
- Ainsworth, John (2 December 2015). Doctor Who: The Complete History: The Christmas Invasion – New Earth – Tooth and Claw. Hachette Partworks, Panini Publishing. ISSN 2057-6048.
- Ainsworth, John (27 January 2016). Doctor Who: The Complete History: The Crusade – The Space Museum – The Chase – The Time Meddler. Hachette Partworks, Panini Publishing. ISSN 2057-6048.
- Ainsworth, John (1 June 2016). Doctor Who: The Complete History: The Abominable Snowmen – The Ice Warriors – The Enemy of the World – The Web of Fear. Hachette Partworks, Panini Publishing. ISSN 2057-6048.
- Ainsworth, John (9 March 2016). Doctor Who: The Complete History: The Deadly Assassin – The Face of Evil – The Robots of Death – The Talons of Weng-Chiang. Hachette Partworks, Panini Publishing. ISSN 2057-6048.
- Ainsworth, John (27 July 2016). Doctor Who: The Complete History: Spearhead from Space – The Silurians – The Ambassadors of Death. Hachette Partworks, Panini Publishing. ISSN 2057-6048.
- Ainsworth, John (10 August 2016). Doctor Who: The Complete History: Planet of Evil – Pyramids of Mars – The Android Invasion – The Brain of Morbius. Hachette Partworks, Panini Publishing. ISSN 2057-6048.
- Ainsworth, John (18 May 2016). Doctor Who: The Complete History: The Power of Kroll – The Armageddon Factor – Destiny of the Daleks. Hachette Partworks, Panini Publishing. ISSN 2057-6048.
- Ainsworth, John (21 September 2016). Doctor Who: The Complete History: School Reunion – The Girl in the Fireplace – Rise of the Cybermen – The Age of Steel – The Idiot's Lantern. Hachette Partworks, Panini Publishing. ISSN 2057-6048.
- Ainsworth, John (6 April 2016). Doctor Who: The Complete History: Planet of the Daleks – The Green Death – The Time Warrior. Hachette Partworks, Panini Publishing. ISSN 2057-6048.
- Ainsworth, John (12 July 2017). Doctor Who: The Complete History: The Macra Terror – The Faceless Ones – The Evil of the Daleks – The Tomb of the Cybermen. Hachette Partworks, Panini Publishing. ISSN 2057-6048.
- Ainsworth, John (23 August 2017). Doctor Who: The Complete History: Underworld – The Invasion of Time – The Ribos Operation. Hachette Partworks, Panini Publishing. ISSN 2057-6048.
- Ainsworth, John (22 February 2017). Doctor Who: The Complete History: Arc of Infinity – Snakedance – Mawdryn Undead. Hachette Partworks, Panini Publishing. ISSN 2057-6048.
- Ainsworth, John (8 March 2017). Doctor Who: The Complete History: Silence in the Library – Forest of the Dead – Midnight – Turn Left. Hachette Partworks, Panini Publishing. ISSN 2057-6048.
- Ainsworth, John (18 October 2017). Doctor Who: The Complete History: Terminus – Enlightenment – The King's Demons – The Five Doctors. Hachette Partworks, Panini Publishing. ISSN 2057-6048.
- Ainsworth, John (7 February 2018). Doctor Who: The Complete History: The Seeds of Death – The Space Pirates – The War Games. Hachette Partworks, Panini Publishing. ISSN 2057-6048.
