= Monster Love =

2008 novel by Carol Topolski

- First edition (h/b)
- Author: Carol Topolski
- Language: English
- Publisher: Fig Tree
- Publication date: Jan 2008
- Publication place: United Kingdom
- Media type: Print
- Pages: 272
- ISBN: 1-905490-26-7

Monster Love is the debut novel of English author Carol Topolski, published in 2008 by Fig Tree, an imprint of Penguin and was nominated for the Orange Prize for Fiction. According to The Guardian it 'shocked and impressed in equal measure' and has been compared to Lionel Shriver's We Need to Talk About Kevin.

== Plot introduction ==
Set in an affluent Manchester suburb it concerns Brendan and Sherilyn Guttridge and their daughter Samantha, who has not been seen for weeks. The story is told in mostly first person accounts of the couple themselves and of those who come into contact with them. Their love for each other is all-consuming and nothing is allowed to disturb it including the birth of their daughter.

== Inspiration ==
In an interview with Amazon.co.uk the author reveals 'I wanted to explore what lies behind the kind of tabloid headlines that scream "PERVERT! BEAST! MONSTER!" when someone is accused of a heinous crime ... Killing a child – especially your own – ranks high in the hierarchy of unconscionable acts, so I embarked on an archaeological dig in the Gutteridges' history, hoping to disinter whatever had caused them to kill their child.'

The author herself is a practicing psychoanalytic psychotherapist and in her professional life she has 'struggled to discover what froths behind masks and make sense of things that often appear senseless'.

== Reception ==
Alex Larman writing in The Guardian praises the first half of the book and its 'psychological acuity' but is disappointed by its "slow decline into more routine 'blame the parents' plotting". James Urquhart in The Independent also remarks on the strength of the 'emotional realism' in the opening chapters and agrees that the novel ultimately 'loses its way'. Both reviewers though see much promise in this debut and look forward to the author's future work.
