= Carol Topolski =

British novelist

- Born: 1949 (age 76–77)
- Education: University of East Anglia (MA)
- Occupations: Novelist; psychologist
- Known for: Monster Love
- Spouse: Michael Jonathan Topolski
- Children: 2
- Father: Kit Pedler

Carol Topolski (born 1949) is a British novelist. Before becoming a full-time writer she was a practising psychoanalytic psychologist and she drew on her experiences in writing her first novel, Monster Love which was published in 2008. According to The Guardian it 'shocked and impressed in equal measure' and has been compared to Lionel Shriver's We Need to Talk About Kevin. Her second novel Do No Harm was published in 2010.

Born in 1949, her mother was a child psychologist and her father was scientist and author Kit Pedler. She studied English at Sussex University and is a graduate of the UEA Creative Writing Course. She has had many varied jobs, spending ten years working as a probation officer and a further twelve years as a censor working for the BBFC. She has also set up a rape crisis centre in Canterbury.

She has two daughters and a granddaughter and now lives in Clapham, South London with her husband of 39 years who is Judge Michael Jonathon Topolski Queen's Counsel. She grew up in the area but expressed an interest in moving to East Dulwich in a May 2008 interview. According to a 2011 article she was still living in Clapham at the time of the interview.
