= Kit Pedler =

British medical scientist, parapsychologist and science fiction author

- Born: Christopher Magnus Howard Pedler; 11 June 1927; London, England
- Died: 27 May 1981 (aged 53); Kent, England
- Occupations: Scientist, author, writer
- Known for: Co-creator of the Cybermen and Doomwatch
- Children: 2, including Carol Topolski

Christopher Magnus Howard Pedler (11 June 1927 – 27 May 1981) was an English medical scientist, parapsychologist, and science fiction screenwriter and author.

== Career ==
Pedler was the head of the electron microscopy department at the Institute of Ophthalmology, University of London, where he published a number of papers. His first television contribution was for the BBC programme Tomorrow's World.

=== Doctor Who ===
In the mid-1960s, Pedler became the unofficial scientific adviser to the Doctor Who production team. Hired by producer Innes Lloyd to inject more hard science into the stories, Pedler formed a particular writing partnership with Gerry Davis, the programme's story editor. Their interest in the problems of science changing and endangering human life led them to create the Cybermen.

Pedler wrote three scripts for Doctor Who: The Tenth Planet (with Gerry Davis), The Moonbase and The Tomb of the Cybermen (also with Gerry Davis). He also submitted the story outlines that became The War Machines, The Wheel in Space and The Invasion.

=== Doomwatch ===
Pedler and Davis devised and co-wrote Doomwatch, a science fiction television programme produced for BBC1. The programme, which ran for three seasons from 1970 to 1972 (comprising 37 50-minute episodes plus one not broadcast), covered a government department that worked to combat technological and environmental disasters. Pedler and Davis contributed to only the first two series.

Pedler and Davis re-used the plot of the first episode of the series, "The Plastic Eaters", for their 1971 novel Mutant 59: The Plastic Eater.

== Other work ==
Pedler's non-fiction book The Quest for Gaia gave practical advice on creating an ecologically sustainable lifestyle, using James Lovelock's Gaia hypothesis.

== Personal life ==
Pedler was the father of the novelist Carol Topolski. His other daughter, Lucy, is an ecological architect who practices sustainable design. Interviews with his daughters can be found on the commentary track of episode one of the BBC's Doctor Who DVD release of The Moonbase.

== Death ==
Pedler died of a heart attack at his home in Doddington, Kent, while completing production of Mind Over Matter, a series for Thames Television on the paranormal that he presented with Tony Bastable.

Pedler is buried at All Saints Church in the Kent village of Graveney, where he lived before moving to nearby Doddington.

== Parapsychology ==
Pedler was the author of Mind Over Matter (1981) which was based on the television series. The book argued for psychic phenomena such as psychokinesis and remote viewing. He also wrote there may be evidence for an "intelligent and massively ordered design" in the universe. The book was criticized for making incorrect statements about science. The science writer Georgina Ferry in a review wrote that the book and television series contained errors, lacked objectivity and is "not good science, neither is it good television".

== Writing credits ==
Production	Notes	Broadcaster
Doctor Who	30 episodes (1966-1968): The War Machines (1966); The Tenth Planet (co-written with Gerry Davis, 1966); The Moonbase (1967); The Tomb of the Cybermen (co-written with Gerry Davis, 1967); The Wheel in Space (1968); The Invasion (1968)	BBC1
Doomwatch	22 episodes (co-written with Gerry Davis, 1970–1971)	BBC1

== Bibliography ==
- Mutant 59: The Plastic Eaters (1971) (with Gerry Davis)
- Brainrack (1974) (with Gerry Davis)
- Doomwatch: The World in Danger (1975)
- The Dynostar Menace (1975) (with Gerry Davis)
- The Quest for Gaia (1979)
- Mind Over Matter: A Scientist's View of the Paranormal (1981)
