= For Tonight We Might Die =

2016 episode of science fiction series

01 – "For Tonight We Might Die"
- Class episode
- The Doctor (Peter Capaldi, right) is summoned when the school prom is attacked by Corakinus (Paul Marc Davis) and the Shadow Kin.

Cast
- Starring: Greg Austin – Charlie; Fady Elsayed – Ram; Sophie Hopkins – April; Vivian Oparah – Tanya; Katherine Kelly – Miss Quill
- Others: Peter Capaldi – The Doctor; Jordan Renzo – Matteusz; Ben Peel – Coach Dawson; Shannon Murray – Jackie; Aaron Neil – Varun; Natasha Gordon – Vivian; Anna Shaffer – Rachel; Paul Marc Davis – Corakinus; Nigel Betts – Mr Armitage; Pooja Shah – Miss Shah; Alex Leak – Kevin; Laura June Hudson – Mrs Linderhof; Santam Bhogal – Counter Clerk; Ellie James – Student 1; Moses Adejimi – Student 2; Assay Hagos – Student 3; Shalisha James-Davis – Student 4

Production
- Directed by: Ed Bazalgette
- Written by: Patrick Ness
- Script editor: Emma Genders
- Produced by: Derek Ritchie
- Executive producers: Brian Minchin; Steven Moffat; Patrick Ness
- Music by: Blair Mowat
- Series: Series 1
- Running time: 50 minutes
- First broadcast: 22 October 2016

Chronology
← Preceded by —	Followed by → "The Coach with the Dragon Tattoo"

"For Tonight We Might Die" is the first episode of the British science-fiction television series Class, a spin-off series of Doctor Who. It was written by Patrick Ness and directed by Ed Bazalgette. It was released online by BBC Three on 22 October 2016 to generally positive critical reviews.

In the episode, a group of students are forced to work together when the school comes under siege by an alien race called the Shadow Kin ahead of the school's autumn prom. The episode features a guest appearance by Peter Capaldi as the Twelfth Doctor.

== Plot ==
April, a student at Coal Hill Academy, asks Tanya to help with the decorating for the prom, Tanya declines. The four attend class with Miss Quill, a blunt and sharp woman. April hands out fliers after school to get help the decorating the prom hall. Ram attends football practice and watches as a separate shadow attaches to the shadow of another player. Tanya attempts to help out with the prom decorations but ultimately returns home after, being chased away by another shadow, and returns home to her strict mother. Charlie lives with Quill, and he questions her about a missing student and whether she killed him. She recalls giving the student her gun, and the student exploded into smoke after firing off a shot.

When April is trapped by a shadow whilst decorating the hall, Quill demands that she uses her gun to shoot the monster. The shot grazes the alien, Corakinus, resulting in him sharing April's heart after his own is displaced. Charlie reveals that he is an alien prince and that his people were at war with the Quill, and "Miss Quill", the leader of the opposition, was captured and forced to serve and protect Charlie. Rhodia was attacked by Corakinus's people, the Shadow Kin, who wiped out all but Charlie and Miss Quill, who were rescued by the Doctor.

Corakinus appears, crushes Quill's gun and severs Ram's leg. The Doctor arrives to rescue them. Corakinus reveals that he is here for the Cabinet of Souls, the resting place for Charlie's people after they die; the Kin believe it to be a weapon. Charlie says that the Cabinet is empty. Tanya, with assistance from the Doctor, turns on the gym's flood lights to eliminate the shadows that give the Kin substance. Ram slams Corakinus back into the rift, and the Doctor closes the breach. The Doctor gives Ram a prosthetic leg from the TARDIS, and instructs the five students and Quill to safeguard the school against alien attacks. Quill muses that she would have used the Cabinet of Souls to wipe out the Shadow Kin, but Charlie disagrees. Charlie looks into the Cabinet of Souls, revealing that it's not empty, and reassures his people with his presence.

== Production ==
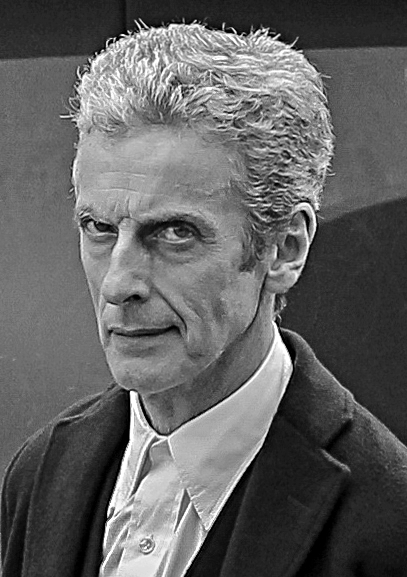
Peter Capaldi guest-starred in the first episode as the Doctor from Doctor Who.

The series was created by young adult fiction writer Patrick Ness. Ness had the idea for the show while writing an episode treatment for Doctor Who. Ness stated that his idea was originally a story contained within a Doctor Who episode before he reworked it into a spin-off series. Ness drew upon influences from his previous young adult fiction book called The Rest of Us Just Live Here, specifically from the idea of characters living in a universe alongside "The Chosen Ones", but who aren't themselves Chosen Ones. Steven Moffat served as executive producers on the show. The production staff aimed to gear the audience towards the young adult demographic, the same demographic most of Ness' works target.

The writing style for the show was influenced by prior TV series in the adolescent genre, including The Vampire Diaries and Buffy the Vampire Slayer — with both series being directly name-dropped in this episode. Minchin said that he planned to not make the series as dark as Torchwood, a previous Doctor Who spin-off. He felt that the dark tone of Torchwood series one "drove people away" from the show and wanted to avoid a similar effect. In an interview with Radio Times, Minchin explained that the division to create a Doctor Who spin-off was in part because Ness had a "great idea" for it.

"For Tonight We Will Die" was directed by Edward Bazalgette. Various references to Doctor Who were placed throughout the new show by the production staff. Producer Derek Ritchie told Radio Times: "We're kind of peppering the show with little easter eggs wherever possible." Ritchie went on to explain that there are "little nods throughout, in design or wherever, that will always link it to the Doctor Who universe. Because that's so important to our audience as well. To feel part of Doctor Who, but a new part of Doctor Who as well." Peter Capaldi guest-starred in the first episode as the Doctor from Doctor Who. The first episode was filmed inside of and around the location of Cardiff. The main studio used was Roath Lock Studios in Cardiff.

== Release and reception ==
"For Tonight We Might Die" first premiered on BBC Three on 22 October 2016, alongside the following episode, "The Coach with the Dragon Tattoo". In 2017, the episode was rerun on BBC One in the United Kingdom, ABC Television in Australia, and BBC America in the United States. The episode's BBC One airdate was at 22:45 on 9 January.

=== Critical reception ===
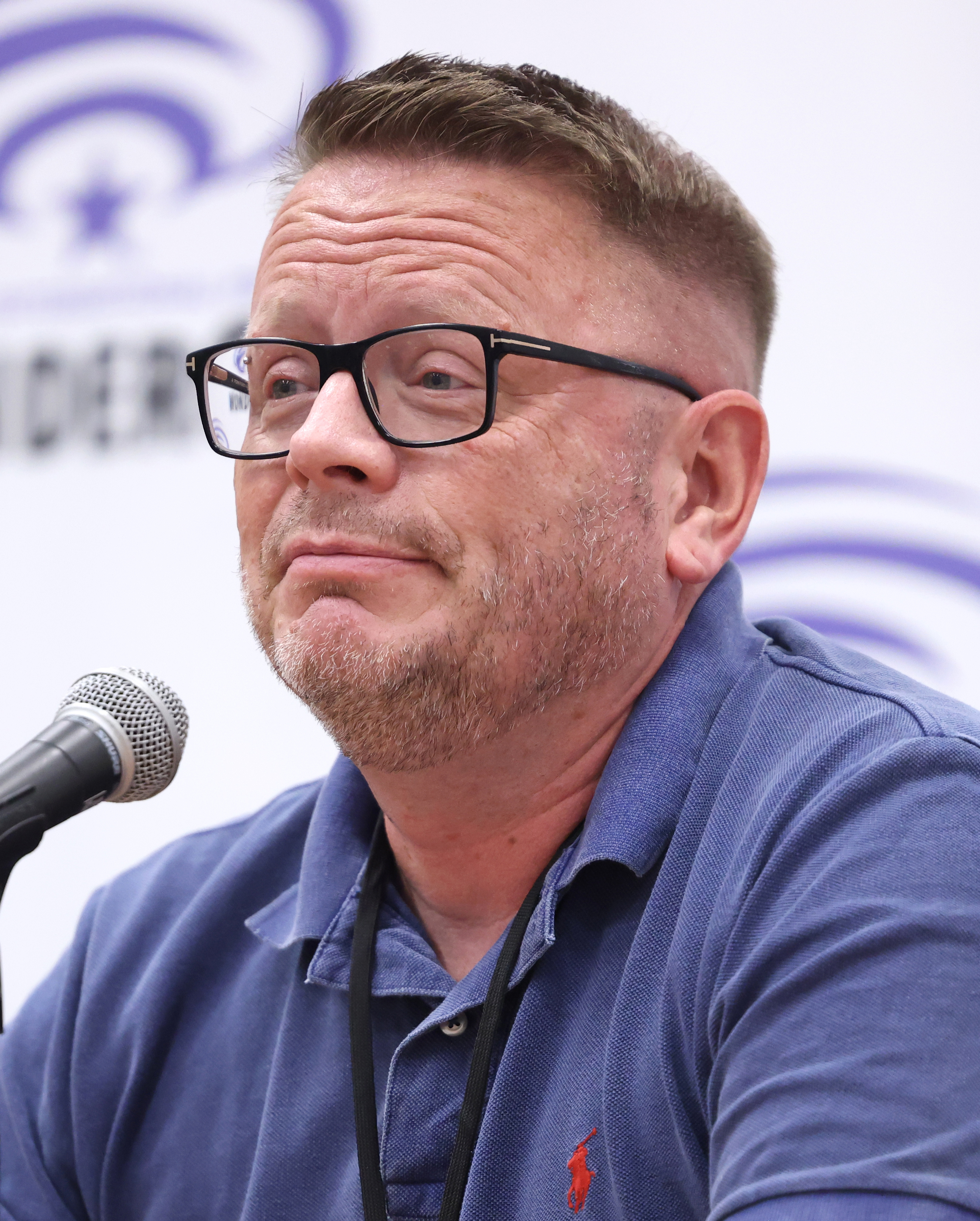
Patrick Ness speaking at an event in Anaheim, California.

The episode was met with positive reviews from critics. Phil Harrison from The Guardian praised the episode, saying that it filled the void left by Torchwood's cancelation. Morgan Jeffrey from Digital Spy praised the acting from the child actors that were "nailing every single beat", though he also criticised some other aspects of the episode.

Den of Geek's Louisa Mellor summed it up as "Witty, energetic Doctor Who spin-off Class wears its influences well and gets a great deal right for its target audience." WalesOnline gave the series first couple episodes a rating of five starts out of five, with writer David Prince summarizing the show as being "a bit like a British Buffy"; he also praised Cardiff for looking amazing, but opined that the show was not for children. CNET's Richard Trenholm praised the acting, particularly that of Elsayed. Writing for the Brisbane Times, Melinda Houston gave the episode a rating of three and a half stars. Catherine Gee from The Daily Telegraph criticised the "clumsy writing" of the first episode and noted that the following episode was an improvement.
