= Brave-ish Heart =

05 – "Brave-ish Heart"
- Class episode
- Surrounded by Miss Quill (Katherine Kelly, right) and Matteusz (Jordan Renzo, left), Charlie (Greg Austin) must make an impossible choice.

Cast
- Starring: Greg Austin – Charlie; Fady Elsayed – Ram; Sophie Hopkins – April; Vivian Oparah – Tanya; Katherine Kelly – Miss Quill
- Others: Jordan Renzo – Matteusz; Pooky Quesnel - Dorothea Ames; Paul Marc Davis - Corakinus; Aaron Neil - Varun; Shannon Murray - Jackie; Con O'Neill - Huw; Pooja Shah as Miss Shah; Moses Adejimi - Student 1

Production
- Directed by: Philippa Langdale
- Written by: Patrick Ness
- Produced by: Derek Ritchie
- Executive producers: Patrick Ness; Steven Moffat; Brian Minchin
- Music by: Blair Mowat
- Series: Series 1
- Running time: 2nd of 2-part story, 45 minutes
- First broadcast: 12 November 2016

Chronology
← Preceded by "Co-Owner of a Lonely Heart"	Followed by → "Detained"

"Brave-ish Heart" is the fifth episode of the British science fiction television series Class. It was released online by BBC Three on 12 November 2016. The episode was written by series creator Patrick Ness and directed by Philippa Langdale. It forms a two-part story with the previous episode, "Co-Owner of a Lonely Heart".

Class follows four students of Coal Hill Academy and their alien teacher, as they deal with various alien threats. Following the events of the previous episode, April (Sophie Hopkins), accompagned by Ram (Fady Elsayed), is now on the planet of the Shadow Kin, hunting for their king Corakinus (Paul Marc Davis). Meanwhile, their friends and families work together to try to stop flesh-eating petals to take over the city, and Charlie (Greg Austin) is faced with the possibility of using the Cabinet of Souls, thus destroying the souls of his entire race, to either destroy the petals and save earth, or wipe out the Shadow Kin to avenge his and Miss Quill (Katherine Kelly)'s races, thus committing genocide.

The episode's title, which refers to April's braveness to face Corakinus and the fact they share the same heart, is also a reference to Mel Gibson's 1995 film Braveheart. The episode was positively received by critics, who praised its acting and character development.

== Plot ==
Dorothea Ames tells Quill that she and the Governors believe Quill may be an asset in repelling alien incursions. Ames reveals that the Cabinet of Souls myth is real, and offers to free Quill from the arn if Quill forces Charlie to use the weapon to destroy the petals. Charlie, Matteusz, and April's parents arrive at Coal Hill; Dorothea explains the threat. Charlie, Matteusz, Quill, and Ames go to the Cabinet; Quill asks Charlie to avenge their peoples by destroying the Shadow Kin instead of the petals. Charlie refuses to use the weapon, as it would destroy his people's souls and leave him with no identity. Ames threatens Charlie and Matteusz with a gun; Matteusz incapacitates her. Tanya updates Varun; they join April's parents at Coal Hill and Tanya defuses the adults' argument over Ram and April's relationship. The petals begin to devour humans.

April and Ram search the Underneath, the Shadow Kin planet, to find and kill Corakinus, though this will also kill April. April's connection to Corakinus grants her Shadow Kin knowledge and the ability to track him, but Corakinus can also sense her. April confronts and defeats Corakinus, and April's connection to Jackie enables April to open a passage to Earth. Huw convinces April not to execute Corakinus, and the humans return to Earth. April realizes she is King of the Shadow Kin; she orders the Shadow Kin to imprison Corakinus, destroy the petals, return to the Underneath, and destroy the passage. Charlie finally activates the Cabinet but stops when the petals are destroyed. He admits he doesn't know whom he would have targeted.

Ames admits to Quill that the Governors expected April to save Earth, and that the petals shared one soul; her goal was to study Charlie and Quill. Ames reaffirms the offer to free Quill. Corakinus destroys the anchor, reverting his connection to April to its former state; April loses her powers and is no longer King. April affirms that Huw must stay away unless she or Jackie seeks contact; April helps Jackie take her first step.

== Production ==
The episode was directed by Philippa Langdale, who also directed the first half of the two-parter, "Co-Owner of a Lonely Heart". It premiered on 12 November 2016 at 10am. The episode is scheduled for broadcast in the United States in early 2017 on BBC America.

== Reception ==
The episode was met with positive reception from critics. April, Charlie, Miss Quill, and Matteusz's character development was praised, as were Sophie Hopkins and Katherine Kelly's performances as April and Quill. Some, however, felt that the episode lacked focus and had tone issues.

In a positive review, Alex Moreland of Flickering Myth criticized that the episode felt "almost like a perfunctory piece, dedicated more to establishing important details about future episodes, rather than being concerned with how it works as an hour of drama in its own right". However, he highly praised Greg Austin and Katherine Kelly's performances as Charlie and Miss Quill, and their respective characters' development. He also noted the series' "admirable commitment to intimate storytelling, emphasising the importance of emotional support and mental well-being – all while breaking the typically prescribed gender roles one might associate with such actions". He gave the episode a rating of 7 out of 10.

Morgan Jeffery of Digital Spy, who gave the previous episode a mixed review, was more positive about "Brave-ish Heart", considering it a satisfying conclusion. He praised the character development, and Kelly's performance as Miss Quill. He however was critical of the handling of the show's sci-fi aspect, stating "while Class nails the emotional beats, it fudges the fiddly sci-fi details. The show continues to throw fantastical nonsense at the viewer (How did April heal her Mum? Why did she suddenly lose her powers? How do the Shadowkin turn the petals into shadow?) and just demands we accept it".

In a positive review, Cult Box highly praised Sophie Hopkins' performance as April, calling it a "tour de force".

Loulsa Mellor of Den of Geek, who gave the previous episode a positive review, was more critical of "Brave-ish Heart", especially for its tone, stating "keeping emotions running that high without skidding off into histrionics is a delicate balance, and one Class didn’t quite pull off here" [...] The will to counter tension with light-heartedness was there, but the zingers were drowned out by the deafening drumbeat of April’s Very Serious Quest". He also thought that the fifth episode of the series was too early to have April accomplish such impressive feature. He however stated that it was "an emphatic episode, start to finish. There was no let-up in its urgent intensity".
