= Co-Owner of a Lonely Heart =

04 – "Co-Owner of a Lonely Heart"
- Class episode
- To save her friends and family, April (Sophie Hopkins, center) gets ready to travel to the world of the Shadow Kin.

Cast
- Starring: Greg Austin – Charlie; Fady Elsayed – Ram; Sophie Hopkins – April; Vivian Oparah – Tanya; Katherine Kelly – Miss Quill
- Others: Jordan Renzo – Matteusz; Pooky Quesnel – Dorothea Ames; Paul Marc Davis – Corakinus; Kelly Gough – Rannus and Kharrus; Aaron Neil – Varun; Shannon Murray – Jackie; Con O'Neill – Huw; Pooja Shah – Miss Shah; Moses Adejimi – Student 1; Ellie James – Student 2; Neil McCaul – Rannus (voice)

Production
- Directed by: Philippa Langdale
- Written by: Patrick Ness
- Produced by: Derek Ritchie
- Executive producers: Patrick Ness; Steven Moffat; Brian Minchin
- Music by: Blair Mowat
- Series: Series 1
- Running time: 1st of 2-part story, 45 minutes
- First broadcast: 5 November 2016

Chronology
← Preceded by "Nightvisiting"	Followed by → "Brave-ish Heart"

"Co-Owner of a Lonely Heart" is the fourth episode of the British science fiction television series Class. It was released online by BBC Three on 5 November 2016. The episode was written by series creator Patrick Ness and directed by Philippa Langdale. It forms a two-part story with the following episode, "Brave-ish Heart".

Class follows four students of Coal Hill Academy and their alien teacher, as they deal with various alien threats. In the episode, the physical and mental connection on between April (Sophie Hopkins) and the king of the Shadow Kin Corakinus (Paul Marc Davis) deepens against their will. Meanwhile, Miss Quill (Katherine Kelly) meets the new principal, Dorothea Ames (Pooky Quesnel), who reveals that the Academy is a part of a bigger picture and warns her about an ongoing invasion no one even noticed yet.

The episode's title, which refers to April and Corakinus sharing the same heart, is also a reference to the song "Owner of a Lonely Heart" by Yes. It was positively met by critics, who praised its character development.

== Plot ==
In the Underneath, the home planet of the Shadow Kin, King Corakinus summons one of his followers, Rannus, who tries to cut the link between Corakinus' heart and April's; however, his magic only ends up making the connection even stronger. As Corakinus executes Rannus for his failure, April, sharing his rage and having lost control for an instant, realizes that she can now summon dark swords like the Shadow Kin. Meanwhile, Charlie reveals the Cabinet of Souls to Matteusz.

Back at school, April still feels the effects of her connection with Corakinus, and as a result, gets angered during a class on the subject of war. She tells Ram, whom she started a romantic relationship with in the previous episode, but as they ponder what to do, they are interrupted by April's father Huw, recently released from prison and estranged by the family after he tried to kill himself, April and her mother in a suicide attempt. As the conversation heats up, April, influenced by Corakinus, summons a shadow sword and scares him away. As April and Ram bond further and make love, Corakinus, unable to control the feelings he has from April, also has sex with Kharrus, another Shadow Kin attempting to help him. April's mother subsequently find April and Ram in bed together.

Back at school, Miss Quill meets the new head teacher, Dorothea Ames (replacing Mr. Armitage, who died in "The Coach with the Dragon Tattoo" and is considered missing). Charlie talks more about the Cabinet of Souls to Matteusz, stating that theoretically, in the hands of "a hero," the souls of his race contained inside the cabinet would take over the body they are attacking, instead of just destroying it, thus becoming alive again. Miss Quill happens to overhear one of their conversations; furious at the discovery that Charlie has at his disposition a weapon capable of eradicating the Shadow Kin (thus taking revenge for the massacre of both Charlie and Quill's races), she is summoned by the new principal, who reveals that she knows everything about the recent events at the Academy, and the true identities of both Miss Quill and Charlie. She also reveals that is working for the Governors (whom Miss Quill first discovered in "The Coach with the Dragon Tattoo"), and warns her about the ongoing invasion of killer petals who feed on meat to multiply and have been taking over the city since the previous night. Finally, she reveals that she might be able to remove the creature inside of Quill's head, thus allowing her to have her free will back.

As April is in a dispute with her mother about her relationship with Ram, her father comes back once again. Kharrus happens to be trying to cut the link once again at the same time; as she fails, Corakinus executes her, and April, sharing his rage, loses control and comes close to killing her father. At the last moment, however, she successfully fights against Corakinus' influence and her own hatred against her father, sparing him. As Kharrus' experiment turns out to be a partial success, Corakinus discovers April's location. After sharing some of her connection to the Shadow Kin with her mother, thus repairing her legs, April makes the choice to go directly to Corakinus before he comes to Earth, leaping through a tear in space-time to the Underneath. Ram follows her right before the passage closes up.

== Production ==
The episode was directed by Philippa Langdale, who also directed the second of half the two-parter, "Brave-ish Heart". It premiered on 5 November 2016 at 10am. The episode was broadcast in the United States on BBC America 6 May 2017 directly after the fourth installment of the Tenth Series of Doctor Who "Knock Knock".

== Reception ==
Critical reception for the episode was positive; April's character development, the evolution of the relationship between Charlie and Matteusz, and the final scene were praised.

In a positive review, Den of Geek commented that the episode felt like a series finale, both praising and criticizing that "There was enough story development in this episode to power a series twice or possibly four times the length of Class", and stating "An uneven mix of romance, comedy and high-stakes drama, [the episode] may have struggled to find the right balance of tone and even tipped over into unintentional silliness at times but it proved one thing: Class certainly has the courage of its convictions."

In a positive review, Cult Box praised the directing and character development and gave the episode 4 stars out of 5.

Alex Moreland of Flickering Myth gave a very positive review, praising the character development. He commented that, despite being the first half of a two-parter, the episode is "still an engaging piece of television in its own right [...] which manages to provide us with 50 minutes of compelling entertainment". He gave the episode a rating of 9 out of 10. Ian Cullen of SciFi Pulse called it "the best episode yet" and praised April's character development and Sophie Hopkins' performance.

Despite praising the character development, Digital Spy gave a less positive review, feeling that, apart from its ending, the episode mostly felt like a set-up for the following episode.
