= The Lost (Class) =

08 – "The Lost"
- Class episode
- The students, including Charlie (Greg Austin, left) and Matteusz (Jordan Renzo), must reunite to fight the Shadow Kin.

Cast
- Starring: Greg Austin – Charlie; Fady Elsayed – Ram; Sophie Hopkins – April; Vivian Oparah – Tanya; Katherine Kelly – Miss Quill
- Others: Jordan Renzo – Matteusz; Pooky Quesnel - Dorothea Ames; Paul Marc Davis - Corakinus; Aaron Neil - Varun; Shannon Murray - Jackie; Natasha Gordon – Vivian; Ellie James – Female Student; Cyril Nri – Chair; Sam Sweeney – Sam; Jim Moray – Folk Musician

Production
- Directed by: Julian Holmes
- Written by: Patrick Ness
- Script editor: Emma Genders
- Produced by: Derek Ritchie
- Executive producers: Brian Minchin; Steven Moffat; Patrick Ness
- Music by: Blair Mowat
- Series: Series 1
- Running time: 50 minutes
- First broadcast: 3 December 2016

Chronology
← Preceded by "The Metaphysical Engine, or What Quill Did"	Followed by → —

"The Lost" is the eighth and final episode of the British science-fiction television series Class, a spin-off series of Doctor Who. It was released online by BBC Three on 3 December 2016. The episode was written by series creator Patrick Ness and directed by Julian Holmes. In September 2017, BBC Three confirmed that the series was cancelled, resulting in "The Lost" becoming the default series finale, although it was not conceived as such.

Class follows four students of Coal Hill Academy and their alien teacher, as they deal with various alien threats. In the episode, after the events of "Detained", the group fell apart, unable to recover from the truths they learned about each other, when the king of the Shadow Kin Corakinus (Paul Marc Davis), resolute to take April's (Sophie Hopkins) heart and the Cabinet of Souls, attacks and threatens to kill all their loved ones until he has what he desires. "The Lost" received mixed reviews from critics, who criticized its fast pacing and saw it as a lead-up to a future season rather than a satisfying conclusion, although the performances and characters were praised.

== Plot ==
The gang has splintered - they are alienated and alone, unable to recover from the truths they faced in detention. Miss Quill is in hibernation, but she is a ticking time bomb - ready for revenge when she wakes. Lost without one another, the gang must reunite when the Shadow Kin return to Earth, raging a ruthless, unrelenting war. Corakinus returns to Earth through minute tears in space-time and murders Ram's father and Tanya's mother. Following this, Tanya seeks the help of Quill and discovers her pregnancy. Charlie and Matteusz confront and threaten Ames into helping them. Corakinus returns and attempts to kill Tanya's brothers; Quill steps in to save them, but not before Corakinus is able to tie his life to Charlie's. Quill teaches Tanya how to fight in preparation for an inevitable war whilst both Ram and Tanya command Charlie to use the Cabinet of Souls in order to prevent any more people from dying. Corakinus threatens to kill Matteusz and tells April that he will leave Earth if she sacrifices herself; however, this is proven to be a lie. When the Shadow Kin invade Earth and take over the streets, Charlie is left with no choice but to use the Cabinet of Souls, which is expected will also kill April and himself. The Cabinet wipes out every last Shadow Kin, unleashing it across the city of London. Quill saves Charlie from the cabinet from killing him. Meanwhile, April awakens in the body of Corakinus. Elsewhere, Ames returns to the Governors where she is judged unfit to continue serving them or witness "the arrival" for having allowed the Cabinet to be used, and is murdered by a Weeping Angel.

== Production ==
The episode was directed by Julian Holmes. It premiered on 3 December 2016 at 10am. The episode was broadcast in the United States in early 2017 on BBC America. The episode was broadcast on 20 May 2017 in the United States on BBC America after the sixth episode of tenth series of Doctor Who "Extremis".

== Reception ==
The episode received mixed reviews from critics. The development of the characters, and performances, especially from Greg Austin, Katherine Kelly, and Jordan Renzo were praised, but many reviewers felt that the episode was too fast-paced, and did not feel like a satisfying conclusion for the season's storylines.

Entertainment Weekly's Nivea Serreao and Kelly Connolly both gave a positive review, praising the episode's stakes, twists and characters, especially Tanya. However, Connolly stated that it was "so overloaded with death-or-death problems that little moments never have a chance to land."

Doctor Who TV called Class "a finale that not only addresses the necessary narrative requirements, but does so in unexpected ways, shaded by the writer’s personal agenda, that inform Class' ultimate message." They praised the writing of the characters, and that "The complete destruction of the entire Shadow Kin populace is portrayed not as 'justifiable' but as necessary." However, they thought that the episode "leaves too many logistical questions unanswered, and several characters see little resolution to their character arc." They concluded by stating "Overall, Class is a remarkably efficient, seldom-rushed, eight-episode series; however, in trying to generate compelling interest in a second series, Ness’ script for 'The Lost' feels irresolute. Such a dense narrative needed a proper epilogue, a ninth episode."

Flickering Myth called "The Lost" "a disappointing finale to Class – one that, ultimately, is unable to deliver upon the promise of the series as a whole, and leaves the show’s future looking rather uncertain." They heavily criticized the fast pace of the episode, calling it "a real tonal mishmash that can only be described as a disaster". Regarding the ending, they stated that it "confirms the growing suspicion that the Governors were a far more interesting antagonistic force than the Shadowkin could ever have been – something we hadn’t seen before, something new, and by extension something exciting. And this is very much the wrong note to end the episode on – and indeed the wrong note to end the series on. In some ways it feels like a dismissal of what’s gone on before, an entirely unearned moment of saying "actually, all the good stuff will be next year". However, he praised the performance of Katherine Kelly, and the characters of Charlie and Matteusz.

Cult Box gave a very positive review, stating that Class "has beaten its own path rather than relying on elements from the main show. However, with the creative vision that Patrick Ness has demonstrated throughout, we have faith that he will put a new spin on the killer statues and we look forward to seeing where he takes them and Coal Hill Academy in the future." In a moderately positive review, Vodzilla called the episode "violent and emotionally wrenching" and praised the treatment of the characters of Charlie, Matteusz and Quill, but also called it "dramatically limp".

Mym Buzz gave a positive review, considering that "'The Lost' offered up an incident-packed, revelation-rammed, fast-paced, visually spectacular season finale – and there were lots of really fun moments, exquisite character exchanges and big dramatic gestures to savour". However, they also called it "a frustratingly vague viewing experience" that " didn’t feel like a climax so much as prologue. It’s great to leave the audience wanting more, but not only because it doesn’t feel like you’ve given them enough."

Den of Geek felt that the finale "didn’t let up in intensity", but suffered from "an excess of urgency and earnestness. When every note is emphasised and there’s no dynamic range, the result is… tonal blandness." He praised the show's tendency to kill off characters and not backing down, stating "You have to admire that kind of gutsiness. Tentative? This show doesn’t know the meaning of the word."
