= Nightvisiting =

03 – "Nightvisiting"
- Class episode
- Tanya is visited by what appears to be her deceased father (Kobna Holdbrook-Smith, pictured).

Cast
- Starring: Greg Austin – Charlie; Fady Elsayed – Ram; Sophie Hopkins – April; Vivian Oparah – Tanya; Katherine Kelly – Miss Quill
- Others: Jordan Renzo – Matteusz; Kobna Holdbrook-Smith – Jasper; Natasha Gordon – Vivian; Anastasia Hille – Orla'ath; Anna Shaffer – Rachel; Andrew Frame – Man; Janie Booth – Old Woman

Production
- Directed by: Ed Bazalgette
- Written by: Patrick Ness
- Script editor: Emma Genders
- Produced by: Derek Ritchie
- Executive producers: Patrick Ness; Steven Moffat; Brian Minchin
- Music by: Blair Mowat
- Series: Series 1
- Running time: 45 minutes
- First broadcast: 29 October 2016

Chronology
← Preceded by "The Coach with the Dragon Tattoo"	Followed by → "Co-Owner of a Lonely Heart"

"Nightvisiting" is the third episode of the British science fiction television series Class. It was released online by BBC Three on 29 October 2016. The episode was written by series creator Patrick Ness and directed by Ed Bazalgette.

Class follows four students of Coal Hill Academy and their alien teacher, as they deal with various alien threats. In the episode, the people living around the Academy are visited by loved ones that died. While Tanya (Vivian Oparah) and Miss Quill (Katherine Kelly) have to decide how to deal with their returning deceased family members, the rest of the students discover that this event might be yet another threat to the human kind.

== Plot ==
On the second anniversary of her father's death, Tanya is visited by an apparition of him, imploring her to take his hand and bond their souls across space and time. She questions the apparition out the possibility of hallucination; she doubts everything when he has legitimate memories of her and himself. He says he if she goes with him she will find closure and be relieved of her grief. Throughout East London, alien vines emerging from the spacetime tear at Coal Hill are capturing Londoners with images of dead loved ones. Even Miss Quill is visited by an entity that claims to be her sister; however, Quill is much more skeptical and doesn't believe what she is seeing. During a video call with April, Ram gets a visitation from Rachel, his late girlfriend. But he flees from her and meets April outside. On the streets, Ram finds the alien has already claimed victims everywhere, with people covered in green slimy vines in shops and the end of streets. April joins him eventually, they investigate together and grow closer; April tells Ram about how her mum ended up in her wheelchair. When she was 8 her dad attempted to drive off a bridge, with her and her mum inside. Ram and April then kiss. Matteusz and Charlie take their relationship to the next level after Matteusz is kicked out of home by his parents. Charlie allows him to live with him; that night they confess their love each other and have sex. Quill confirms her suspicions of her too-nice "sister", learning it is really a projection of a hungry alien creature called the Lan Kin that feeds on the grief of creatures whilst killing them in the process. Quill gets Charlie to stab it in the hand with a screwdriver, which destroys her branch of the Lan Kin. Quill, Charlie, and Matteusz then go outside to help defeat the creature.

Ram and April find the Lan Kin has grown out of a tear in space at the front of Coal Hill. They spot one main tentacle and direct themselves to where it ends which turns out to be Tanya's house. As Tanya and the Lan Kin continue to talk, the more aggressive the Lan Kin gets, proving Tanya's theory of it being a trap. Just in time Ram and April arrive at her house, her mother and brothers have been attacked during their sleep leaving Tanya's the only one awake. But Tanya ends up ignoring them and grasps the Lan Kin. The Lan Kin is tricked by Tanya, being poisoned by her high amount of anger for her father instead of her grief. But this doesn't weaken it enough. Matteusz and Charlie try to cut the vines from outside her flat but fail as they continue to regenerate. Quill drives a double decker bus straight through the main vine of the Lan Kin, yanking the apparition of Tanya's dad out of her bedroom, destroying her window, ultimately stopping the creature in its tracks. Everyone on the streets is returned with no one harmed, but their memories of what happened are gone. The group confines and discusses what happened, whilst Quill watches feeling slightly left out but put off by the comfort they show. Back at her house she gets out her broken gun and promises herself to get it back.

== Production ==
The episode was directed by Ed Bazelgette, who also directed the previous two episodes of the series. It premiered on 29 October 2016 at 10 am. The episode is scheduled for broadcast in the United States in early 2017 on BBC America.

== Reception ==
"Nightvisiting" received very positive reviews. Den of Geek referred to it as the "best episode yet" and claimed "it was a tense, cleverly constructed episode" written by Ness. Morgan Jeffrey of Digital Spy also gave a positive review and cited the episode as "the strongest yet". He heavily praised the young actor's abilities and the material they were given. Cultbox stated that "the scenes between Kobna Holdbrook-Smith and Vivian Oparah as reunited father and daughter were simply riveting" and also heavily praised the episode.

Alasdair Wilkins from the AV club describes the episode as a “bold choice” and “like one of the Show’s best”. Vivian’s Oparah’s performance as Tanya was praised stating she translated “Excellent work” and “makes it possible for the viewer to understand” creating a more relatable direction through Tanya’s development. However, the episode was also viewed going at a “breakneck pace” due to the quick developments of Charlie/Matteusz and Ram/April’s relationships. The resolution was deemed “bonkers” but sums up saying “ “Nightvisiting” absolutely illustrates the potential of Class”. The episode was rewarded with a grade 'B+'.
