= The Coach with the Dragon Tattoo =

2016 Class episode

02 – "The Coach with the Dragon Tattoo"
- Class episode
- Mr. Armitage (Nigel Betts) is brutally killed by the creature.

Cast
- Starring: Greg Austin – Charlie; Fady Elsayed – Ram; Sophie Hopkins – April; Vivian Oparah – Tanya; Katherine Kelly – Miss Quill
- Others: Jordan Renzo – Matteusz; Ben Peel – Coach Dawson; David McGranaghan – Coach Carroll; Aaron Neil – Varun; Nigel Betts – Mr Armitage; Jami Reid-Quarrell – The Inspector; Cally Lawrence – Cleaner

Production
- Directed by: Ed Bazalgette
- Written by: Patrick Ness
- Script editor: Emma Genders
- Produced by: Derek Ritchie
- Executive producers: Patrick Ness; Steven Moffat; Brian Minchin
- Music by: Blair Mowat
- Series: Series 1
- Running time: 45 minutes
- First broadcast: 22 October 2016

Chronology
← Preceded by "For Tonight We Might Die"	Followed by → "Nightvisiting"

"The Coach with the Dragon Tattoo" is the second episode of the British science fiction television series Class. It was released online by BBC Three on 22 October 2016.

Class follows four students of Coal Hill Academy and their alien teacher, as they deal with various alien threats. In this episode, the students, while trying to get over the traumatic events of the previous episode, must find and defeat a dragon-like alien of unknown origin who brutally murders people of the Academy. Meanwhile, Miss Quill (Katherine Kelly) feels that the inspector in charge of reviewing her (Jami Reid-Quarrell) might not be who he appears to be.

The title is inspired by the novel and films The Girl with the Dragon Tattoo.

== Plot ==
Ram struggles to recover from the attack at the prom. Coach Dawson scolds him for poor performance in football and demotes him to the second string team. That week, Ram witnesses a creature slaughter both the assistant coach and a school cleaner, but struggles to find evidence of their deaths after the fact, leading him to question his sanity. Tanya, Charlie, and April investigate on his behalf, and learn that a dragon manifesting in different parts of the school is connected with Coach Dawson. They learn that the coach was bound to a female dragon who came through a rift in time, and became fused to his body as a tattoo; its mate roams the school, killing in order to feed her. Convinced by the sixth formers, the male dragon takes his mate along with the coach back through the tear in time. Ram later tells his father about the events thus far.

== Production ==
The episode was written by Patrick Ness, who also serves as creator and writer of Class. It was directed by Ed Bazalgette, who also directed the series premiere as well as the following episode, "Nightvisiting". "The Coach with the Dragon Tattoo" was predominantly filmed in Roath Lock Studios in Cardiff. The episode premiered on 22 October 2016 alongside the first episode at 10am. The episode was broadcast on 22 April 2017 in the United States on BBC America after the second episode of tenth series of Doctor Who "Smile".

== Reception ==
The episode received positive reviews from critics.

Fansided gave a very positive review, praising the episode for exploring the characters' trauma after the events of the first episode, stating " ‘The Coach with the Dragon Tattoo’ delivers on the promise of an examination of how people deal with extreme circumstances". Den of Geek also gave a positive review.

In a very positive review, Flickering Myth stated "Class takes the smarter route, here, in letting the friendships grow more naturally from other aspects of the characters’ lives. Indeed, it’s really nice to see Class placing characterisation front and centre, repeatedly emphasising the development of our core cast; it’d be very easy to coast in this department, and leave our characters as more typical young adult fiction stereotypes and shortcuts. However, Class has consistently avoided this route, always ensuring to include little moments of growth and character development in amongst the alien dragons and suchlike".

The AV club's Alasdair Wilkins praised the episode for acknowledging 'the nightmare of living in the Doctor Who universe'. Ram's story was praised as a main focal point for the episode as well as the absence of The Doctor. The episode was described as 'Confident and compelling' and 'a good indication of a show quickly finding its feet and demonstrating ambition'. Wilkins awarded the episode a grade 'A−'.
