= Owner of a Lonely Heart (disambiguation) =

"Owner of a Lonely Heart" is a 1983 song by Yes

Owner of a Lonely Heart may also refer to:

- "Owner of a Lonely Heart" (Grey's Anatomy)
- "Owner of a Lonely Heart" (D:TNG episode)
- "Co-Owner of a Lonely Heart", an episode of Class
