= Class (2016 TV series) =

2016 British science fiction television series

- Genre: Science fiction; Drama
- Created by: Patrick Ness
- Written by: Patrick Ness
- Directed by: Ed Bazalgette; Philippa Langdale; Wayne Che Yip
- Starring: Greg Austin; Fady Elsayed; Sophie Hopkins; Vivian Oparah; Katherine Kelly
- Theme music composer: Alex Clare
- Opening theme: "Up All Night"
- Composer: Blair Mowat
- Country of origin: United Kingdom
- Original language: English
- No. of series: 1
- No. of episodes: 8

Production
- Executive producers: Patrick Ness; Steven Moffat; Brian Minchin
- Running time: 43–50 minutes
- Production companies: BBC Studios; BBC Cymru Wales; BBC America; BBC Worldwide

Original release
- Network: BBC Three
- Release: 22 October – 3 December 2016

Related
- Whoniverse; Doctor Who

Class is a British science fiction drama programme and a spin-off of the long-running programme Doctor Who. It was created and written by Patrick Ness, who also produced alongside Doctor Who showrunner and lead writer Steven Moffat, and Brian Minchin, who acted as producer on Doctor Who and two of its previous spin-offs, Torchwood and The Sarah Jane Adventures.

The series of eight episodes was released on BBC Three between 22 October and 3 December 2016. The story focuses on five of the students and staff at Coal Hill Academy, a longtime recurrent location of Doctor Who, who are tasked by the Doctor to deal with alien threats while trying to deal with their personal lives.

The series received generally positive reviews from critics, with praise for its darker tone, writing, themes, characters, and acting. However, the series scored poor viewership figures for its broadcast on BBC One. On 7 September 2017, BBC Three confirmed that the series was cancelled.

In 2018 Big Finish Productions produced a series of six Class audio adventures, telling the further adventures of the students at Coal Hill Academy. Six more audio adventures were announced for release starting in April 2020, with two of the main characters being recast.

== Premise ==
The programme is set in Coal Hill Academy, a fictional school that has been featured in Doctor Who since the 1963 serial, An Unearthly Child, and focuses on six of its students and staff members.

The sixth formers of Coal Hill Academy all have their own secrets and desires. They have to deal with the stresses of everyday life, including friends, parents, school work, sex, and sorrow, but also the horrors that come from time travel. The Doctor and his time-travelling have made the walls of space and time stretch thin, and monsters are planning to break through and wreak havoc upon the Earth.

== Cast ==
=== Main ===
- Greg Austin as Charlie Smith, an alien posing as a human student. He is the prince of the Rhodians, and the last of his species; after being rescued by the Doctor when his race is slaughtered by another species called the Shadow Kin, he changes his body to a human's and poses as an average 17-year-old student from Sheffield.
- Fady Elsayed as Ram Singh, a tough, antisocial student and gifted football player. After losing his right leg in the first episode, he is given a prosthetic one by the Doctor.
- Sophie Hopkins as April MacLean, an ordinary, unremarkable student whose life is forever changed when she encounters the king of the Shadow Kin, Corakinus.
- Vivian Oparah as Tanya Adeola, a child prodigy of Nigerian origin who moved up three years at Coal Hill School due to her "outstanding examination results" and "truly extraordinary academic capability".
- Katherine Kelly as Miss Andrea Quill, real name Andra'ath, the physics teacher at Coal Hill Academy. Like Charlie, she is secretly an alien and the last of her species, the Quill, long-time war enemies of the Rhodians (who live on a different continent of the same planet). As punishment for her leadership of a war against the Rhodians, Quill is psychically linked to Charlie and must act as his protector.

=== Recurring ===
- Jordan Renzo as Matteusz Andrzejewski, Charlie's love interest and later boyfriend, born and raised in Poland (Note: Despite never being credited in the opening credits of the series, Renzo's character was advertised as a series regular by the BBC multiple times.)
- Paul Marc Davis as Corakinus, the evil king of the Shadow Kin
- Pooky Quesnel as Dorothea Ames, the headteacher of Coal Hill Academy from "Co-Owner of a Lonely Heart"
- Shannon Murray as Jackie MacLean, April's mother who lost the use of her legs
- Aaron Neil as Varun Singh, Ram's father
- Natasha Gordon as Vivian Adeola, Tanya's overprotective mother
- Nigel Betts as Francis Armitage, the headteacher of Coal Hill Academy. He previously appeared as a minor character in the Doctor Who episodes "Into the Dalek", "The Caretaker", and "Dark Water".
- Con O'Neill as Huw MacLean, April's father who was pushed away by the rest of the family after he tried to take his own life and theirs in a suicide attempt
- Anna Shaffer as Rachel Chapman, Ram's girlfriend
- Ben Peel as Coach Tom Dawson, Ram's football coach

=== Notable guest ===
- Peter Capaldi as The Doctor in his twelfth incarnation

== Episodes ==
No.	Title	Directed by	Written by	Original release date
1	"For Tonight We Might Die"	Ed Bazalgette	Patrick Ness	22 October 2016
Alien refugees Miss Quill and Charlie are hiding out at Coal Hill Academy in disguise as a teacher and a pupil. As the Shadow Kin invade and kill pupils, Charlie is forced to reveal to April, Tanya, Ram and Matteusz that he and Quill are the last survivors of an alien war, he a prince, and she is his enslaved bodyguard. At the sixth form prom, the Shadow Kin come through the tear, killing Ram's girlfriend Rachel and severing his leg. The Doctor, who rescued Charlie and Quill and had them hide in the school, arrives to defeat the Shadow Kin. He appoints Miss Quill and the pupils as protectors of the school, noting that it has become a beacon throughout space-time. April is left sharing a heart with the Shadow Kin king, Corakinus, and Ram has his leg replaced with a robotic one.
2	"The Coach with the Dragon Tattoo"	Ed Bazalgette	Patrick Ness	22 October 2016
Ram struggles to recover from the attack at the prom. Coach Dawson scolds him for poor performance in football and demotes him to the second string team. That week, Ram witnesses a creature attack both the assistant coach and a school cleaner, but struggles to find evidence of their deaths after the fact, leading him to question his sanity. Tanya, Charlie, and April investigate on his behalf, and learn that a dragon manifesting in different parts of the school is connected with Coach Dawson. They learn that the coach was bound to a female dragon who came through a rift in time, and became fused to his body as a tattoo; its mate roams the school, killing in order to feed her. Convinced by the sixth formers, the male dragon takes his mate along with the coach back through the tear in time. Ram later tells his father about the events thus far.
3	"Nightvisiting"	Ed Bazalgette	Patrick Ness	29 October 2016
On the second anniversary of her father's death, Tanya is visited by an apparition of him, imploring her to take his hand and bond their souls across space and time. Throughout East London, alien vines emerging from the spacetime tear at Coal Hill are capturing Londoners with images of dead loved ones. Even Miss Quill is visited by an entity that claims to be her sister. Ram and April investigate together, and grow closer. Matteusz and Charlie take their relationship to the next level after Matteusz is kicked out of home by his homophobic parents. After interrogating her "sister," and confirming that Earth has simply been invaded by a hungry alien creature called the Lan Kin, Quill severs the vine outside Tanya's house using a stolen double decker bus, causing the Lan Kin to flee in pain.
4	"Co-Owner of a Lonely Heart" (Part 1)	Philippa Langdale	Patrick Ness	5 November 2016
Following the events of the prom, April is struggling to control herself since she began sharing her heart with the king of the Shadow Kin, Corakinus; the king's attempts to mitigate his impairment have backfired, giving him and April an even deeper psychic connection. Dorothea Ames introduces herself as the new headteacher of Coal Hill Academy following the death of Mr Armitage. She tells Miss Quill of how the Governors are interested in her and later introduces her to an alien carnivorous flower that has been replicating in worrying numbers. April's father is released from prison and pays his family a visit. During a key confrontation, April's parents discover the true nature of her problem as she uncontrollably attacks the both of them. Sensing that Corakinus has discovered her location, April leaps through a tear in space-time to take her heart back, with Ram closely following her.
5	"Brave-ish Heart" (Part 2)	Philippa Langdale	Patrick Ness	12 November 2016
April and Ram arrive on the planet of the Shadow Kin, referred to as the Underneath, where she seeks out the king to claim her heart back. Meanwhile, on Earth, carnivorous flower petals are continuously multiplying and are swamping streets and consuming humans. Dorothea Ames recruits Miss Quill to force Charlie into using the Cabinet of Souls (a weapon of mass destruction made up of the preserved souls of his species) in order to kill the petals, but he seems torn between sacrificing the souls of his people and letting humanity die instead. Channelling the king's own power, April defeats him in combat and becomes king of the Shadow Kin. Returning to Earth, she dispatches her army to destroy the petals, sparing Charlie his decision. The imprisoned former king severs his connection with April, however, once again breaking her control over the Shadow Kin. Ames is pleased at having exploited the situation to learn more about Charlie and the Cabinet of Souls.
6	"Detained"	Wayne Che Yip	Patrick Ness	19 November 2016
Miss Quill places Charlie, April, Ram, Tanya and Matteusz in "detention" whilst she attends urgent matters. A meteor flies through a tear in space-time and displaces the classroom that the five of them are in to an unknown location described as being outside of both time and space. They are trapped; with nobody else aside from a small meteor. This meteor forces whoever is holding it to reveal ugly and personal truths. They soon learn that the meteor is the consciousness of a murderous prisoner; and the five pupils are currently in his augmented prison cell. Charlie soon realises that he is more guilty than the prisoner itself so is thus able to defeat him and return the group back to Coal Hill Academy in one piece. Miss Quill returns, having had quite a day whilst they were away – as apparent from the fact that she is now able to use a gun.
7	"The Metaphysical Engine, or What Quill Did"	Wayne Che Yip	Patrick Ness	26 November 2016
Taking place concurrently to the events of the previous episode, Quill meets Ames after dropping Charlie in detention. Explaining that the Governors have decided to help Quill remove the Arn from her brain, Ames introduces a shapeshifting alien named Ballon (who has become frozen in his human form). The three of them are teleported to a metaphysical reality. Ames explains that as long as a place can be believed in, it exists and can be visited using this device. Over time, they find an Arn specimen to study, obtain the blood of the 'Devil' (to unfreeze Ballon so that he can perform surgery on Quill). They finally obtain the brain of a Quill goddess to study before returning to Coal Hill. Ballon performs the surgery and removes the Arn, freeing Quill but leaving her eye scarred. It's soon revealed that the two of them are in fact in the Cabinet of Souls and Ames will only allow one of them to return to Earth. They end up fighting to the death, with Quill winning a bittersweet victory. Quill returns to the school at the time at which the previous episode ended. She faints and Charlie discovers that she is visibly pregnant.
8	"The Lost"	Julian Holmes	Patrick Ness	3 December 2016
Corakinus returns to Earth through minute tears in space-time and murders Ram's father and Tanya's mother. Following this, Tanya seeks the help of Quill and discovers her pregnancy. Charlie and Matteusz confront and threaten Ames into helping them. Corakinus returns and attempts to kill Tanya's brothers; Quill steps in to save them. Corakinus is able to tie his life to Charlie's. Quill teaches Tanya how to fight in preparation for an inevitable war whilst both Ram and Tanya command Charlie to use the Cabinet of Souls in order to prevent any more people from dying. Corakinus threatens to kill Matteusz and tells April that he will leave Earth if she sacrifices herself; however, this is proven to be a lie. When the Shadow Kin invade Earth and take over the streets, Charlie is left with no choice but to shoot April to stop him and becomes new Shadow King. He decides to use the Cabinet of Souls, which is expected to also kill April and himself. The Cabinet wipes out every last Shadow Kin. Charlie, saved by Quill, survives, while April awakens in the body of Corakinus. Elsewhere, Ames returns to the Governors where she is judged unfit to continue serving them or witness "the arrival" for having allowed the Cabinet to be used, and is murdered by a Weeping Angel.

== Production ==
=== Development ===
The programme was announced on 1 October 2015. Steven Moffat executive-produces the programme. It was revealed on 27 April 2016 that Coal Hill was now an academy. Ed Bazalgette was the first director announced for the series. Philippa Langdale directed two episodes, Wayne Yip also directed a number of episodes for the series, and Julian Holmes directed the finale.

In June 2017, Ness announced that if a second series were to go ahead, he would not be continuing as a writer for the series. On 7 September 2017, BBC Three controller Damian Kavanagh confirmed that the series had been cancelled.

=== Casting ===
On 4 April 2016, the main cast of the programme was unveiled. Greg Austin, Fady Elsayed, Sophie Hopkins and Vivian Oparah star as four Sixth Formers, with Austin playing a character named Charlie, while Katherine Kelly portrays Miss Quill, a Coal Hill Academy teacher. Nigel Betts reprises his role as Mr. Armitage from "Into the Dalek", "The Caretaker" and "Dark Water" from the eighth series of Doctor Who. Paul Marc Davis appears in a recurring role in the programme. Anna Shaffer portrays a character named Rachel in the programme.

Patrick Ness revealed on Twitter that one of the lead characters would be a male with a boyfriend. This was eventually revealed to be Charlie, his boyfriend being known as Matteusz. Peter Capaldi, who plays the twelfth incarnation of the Doctor, appears in the opening episode of the programme.

=== Filming ===
Class began filming on 4 April 2016. Wayne Yip reported his block finished filming on 16 August 2016. Filming ended on 2 September 2016.

=== Music ===
The incidental music for Class is written by composer Blair Mowat. The theme song is a shortened version of "Up All Night" by Alex Clare. The BBC created an official playlist of the songs featured within Class as announced on the BBC Class Twitter page.

== Broadcast and release ==
=== Broadcast ===
After being released on BBC Three online from 10 am each week in the UK, the episodes also began to be broadcast on BBC One from 9 January 2017. In the United Kingdom, episodes were available digitally in HD shortly after broadcast on the UK iTunes Store. However, the series scored poor viewership figures for its broadcast on BBC One.

In January 2016, the programme was picked up in the US by BBC America, where the programme received its premiere on 15 April 2017, directly after the premiere of the tenth series of Doctor Who.

The programme received its Canadian premiere on 22 October 2016 on Space. In September 2016, the programme was picked up in Australia by the Australian Broadcasting Corporation, where the episodes were fast-tracked from Britain for ABC iview starting on 22 October 2016, and was broadcast later on ABC2 starting on 24 October 2016. In June 2018, Class was added to Netflix in the UK.

=== Home media release ===
All eight episodes of Class were released on Blu-ray worldwide, and DVD in Region 2, on 16 January 2017.

== Soundtrack ==
Class (Original Television Soundtrack)

Soundtrack album by Blair Mowat
- Released: 7 December 2018
- Genre: Soundtrack
- Length: 1:20:02
- Label: Silva Screen Records

A soundtrack album was released on 7 December 2018. A 500-copies limited edition marbled vinyl edition was released on 4 January 2019. Both CD and LP editions were available with a bonus CD featuring additional score cues.

=== Track listing ===
No.	Title	Length
1.	"The Shadow Kin"	2:11
2.	"Quill’s Got a Gun"	1:05
3.	"Rhodia"	1:42
4.	"Death Awaits Us" (featuring Yuri Kalnits)	1:17
5.	"The Doctor Will See You Now"	1:10
6.	"Aftermath"	0:48
7.	"Time Has Looked at Your Faces"	1:14
8.	"Night Music"	3:16
9.	"The Cabinet of Souls"	1:19
10.	"Back to School"	1:18
11.	"Once Upon a Time in the Classroom"	1:06
12.	"Chasing the Dragon"	1:15
13.	"Dragon Attack"	3:35
14.	"Reflections" (featuring Yuri Kalnits)	1:57
15.	"Strands from the Rift"	1:16
16.	"April’s Past"	2:10
17.	"Gathering Strength"	4:45
18.	"Here She Comes in a Ruddy Great Bus"	0:50
19.	"Heavy Petal"	1:50
20.	"To Share a Heart"	2:52
21.	"Rescue" (featuring Yuri Kalnits)	1:52
22.	"Regicide"	1:08
23.	"Rise to Power" (featuring Yuri Kalnits)	2:07
24.	"First Steps"	2:33
25.	"Asteroid"	3:28
26.	"Angry Enough to Kill"	1:36
27.	"Charlie’s Angry, Charlie’s Winning"	2:44
28.	"Planet of the Arn"	2:46
29.	"All Species Say That"	1:33
30.	"This Form I Wear" (featuring Peter Gregson)	1:18
31.	"Quill vs Lore"	1:29
32.	"I Am War Itself"	1:41
33.	"The Lost" (featuring Jim Moray & Sam Sweeney)	2:06
34.	"Charlie Laying Down the Law"	1:50
35.	"We Are Academics"	1:23
36.	"Fight Music" (featuring Peter Gregson)	1:28
37.	"Finding Courage" (featuring Peter Gregson)	2:23
38.	"If They Die April Dies" (featuring Eurielle & Yuri Kalnits)	1:18
39.	"This Is the One You Will Not Tolerate"	2:37
40.	"Fight Till Your Last Breath" (featuring Eurielle)	1:25
41.	"Souls Released"	2:00
42.	"Governors Revealed"	1:41
43.	"Class Credits"	0:40

Bonus CD
No.	Title	Length
1.	"Previously on Class"
2.	"Charlie Lives with Quill"
3.	"A Night of Promise"
4.	"Corakinus Lives"
5.	"April’s Theme"
6.	"Ram Saves the Day"
7.	"New Beginning"
8.	"The Coach with the Dragon Tattoo"
9.	"Cleaner Skin"
10.	"Tanya"
11.	"Missing Rachel"
12.	"Scooby Gang Skype Sesh"
13.	"I Was Nothing, I Was Weak"
14.	"Team Talk"
15.	"The Governors"
16.	"Nightvisitor/Tanya’s Dad"
17.	"Someone at the Window..."
18.	"Conversations with My Dead Father"
19.	"Ram on the Run"
20.	"Memories of Dad"
21.	"Tentacles!"
22.	"The Cabinet of Snooping"
23.	"Dorothea"
24.	"Evolutionary Mistake"
25.	"I Won't Be Forced"
26.	"Charlie’s Choice"
27.	"I Think I Need Saving"
28.	"Quill Rage"
29.	"Meteor Strike"
30.	"Detained"
31.	"Don't Let My Brain Get Fried"
32.	"When She's Free"
33.	"They Made Me Used to It"
34.	"I Forgive You"
35.	"Tanya Wants to Use the Cabinet"
36.	"Walk & Talk"
37.	"Black is the Colour"
38.	"Ep3 Preview"
39.	"Ep4 Preview"
40.	"Ep5 Preview"
41.	"Ep6 Preview"
42.	"Ep7 Preview"
43.	"Ep8 Preview"
44.	"Vivian Oprah Ep3 Vocal Experiment" (Rough Demo)
45.	"Remembrance of the Charlie Quill Theme" (80s Remix)
46.	"The End" (Unused Alternative Ep8 Credits)

== Reception ==
=== Ratings summary ===
Domestically, the series had poorer than expected ratings, failing to make the BBC iPlayer Top 20 in its first seven weeks, and failing to secure over a million viewers at any point when repeated on BBC One in a late-evening slot across January and February. In the US, the premiere pulled in half a million viewers despite running immediately following Doctor Who, losing almost half its forerunner's audience.

=== Critical response ===
Despite poor ratings, overall reception from critics for the series was mostly positive. It received praise for its darker tone, writing, themes, and acting, as well as for the overall evolution of the characters during the series; Katherine Kelly and her character Miss Quill, in particular, were singled out. However, the Shadow Kin were considered weak enemies, and the first episodes and finale were criticized for their fast pacing. Reviewers noted that the show was similar to Buffy the Vampire Slayer, with some critics considering it a quality that made it stand out more from Doctor Who, and others being critical of it. Review aggregator website Rotten Tomatoes gives the series an 82% rating based on 17 reviews, with an average rating of 6.9/10.

GamesRadar+ called Class "really, really good. So good, in fact, that even after only two-thirds of its very first season, it’s possible to see the show’s potential bubbling over the sides like an over boiled pot of pasta." Doctor Who TV called Class "a remarkably efficient, seldom-rushed, eight-episode series". Despite being critical of early episodes, IndieWire gave the series as a whole a positive review, stating "while the show knows how to juggle the heavier issues and high-concept scenarios, it doesn’t skimp on the fun." They highly praised Kelly's performance, calling her "fabulous", and the characters of Miss Quill and Matteusz, considering them "absolute scene stealers".

Collider was positive about the series, praising the character of Miss Quill, whom they called "the most consistently delightful part of this series", the fact that the character's adventures were "not easy or without its considerable cost", and its themes of loss and grief, stating "Class is at its best when it slows down and doubles down on the more grounded, relatable struggles of its characters. As is the case with good teen horror dramas that has come before it, Class' scariest, most interesting villains aren’t alien monsters that wipe out entire civilizations, but rather the real-world problems like losing a parent, a girlfriend, or losing the time and space to simply be a kid." However, they criticized the show for being too different from Doctor Who, stating "If you’re looking for more of the science fiction idealism that Doctor Who tends to provide, stick to the new season. Here be dragons (sometimes literally) and they will unceremoniously kill people."

The A.V. Club gave a show a B rating, particularly praising the "winning cast of incredibly talented young British actors and its casual diversity, which many contemporary teen shows strive for, but which few pull off so effortlessly." They highly praised the show's representation of homosexual characters, "presented with a refreshing matter-of-factness, not a self-congratulatory pat on the back", the performances (especially Kelly's whom they called a "scene-stealer"), and the characters, stating "There’s not a weak link among the uniformly excellent ensemble and the show serves its teenage characters particularly well by allowing them to have an emotional intelligence that’s not always granted to young protagonists. [...] The most successful parts of the series explore the ways the students support one another through all the weighty challenges they’re faced with, both of the real-world and sci-fi variety. And it weaves in just enough comedy to keep things from becoming too maudlin or too bleak." However, they felt that the science-fiction elements of the series felt out of place: "the extensive exposition needed to introduce the show’s ever-growing mythology starts to sound like someone perpetually reading out the rules for an increasingly complicated adventure board game. As quickly as one element is introduced, more complications are thrown on top of it, leaving the series with little room to breathe."

Entertainment Weekly gave the show a B rating, highly praising the cast: "The young actors are all very talented and have no trouble handling the show’s heavier material. In fact, I found myself wishing there had been more than just eight episodes in the first season because it would’ve been nice to have seen a bit more of the group’s lighthearted side. That being said, the show’s MVP is clearly Kelly, whose Quill not only delivers some of the best lines but also the best arc of the season. Without giving too much away, her dynamic with one of the student leads is the source of some of the season’s most interesting thematic material." However, they regretted that the show's darker tone made it "slightly less fun" than Doctor Who. The Los Angeles Times gave the series a mixed review, stating that Ness' storytelling felt "muddled and mechanical" and "tells you too much, too fast." They however praised that "the female roles are especially strong and well played", particularly praising the performances of Kelly, Sophie Hopkins and Vivian Oparah.

In a post-cancellation review of the series, Morgan Jeffrey of Digital Spy debated the reasons the series was unsuccessful in finding an audience, called the show "the spin-off no-one asked for", and argued that the reason it failed in ratings was due to the BBC not knowing who the show was for: "A teen-oriented drama with adult themes, spun off from a series intended (primarily) for children, the tone of Class was every bit as confused as that muddled origin would suggest." However, and despite having given the show's premiere a mixed review, he stated that "Class wasn't a total write-off. Far from it. The show absolutely had its gripping moments, its standout episodes (the poignant "Nightvisiting" was a clear highlight) – and, oh, what a cast. They'll all be going on to greater things. Most of its problems could've been fixed, if it had done well enough to secure a second series."

== Unmade second series ==
On 21 October 2021, Ness discussed what had been developed for a second series, had Class been renewed. Among the plans were a theme of extreme compromises for the sake of love (with a storyline involving Charlie losing his soul to save Matteusz), a civil war among the Weeping Angels, and the addition of new writers Kim Curran, Juno Dawson and Derek Landy.

== Other media ==
=== Novels ===
- Adams, Guy (2016). Joyride. BBC Books. ISBN 9781785941863.
- Benedict, A.K. (2016). The Stone House. BBC Books. ISBN 9781785941870.
- Goss, James (2016). What She Does Next Will Astound You. BBC Books. ISBN 9781785941887.

=== Audio dramas ===
Big Finish Productions has produced audio dramas based on Class that take place during the run of the TV series. All of the main cast returns, however, for Volumes 3 and 4, Joanna McGibbon replaces Vivian Oparah as Tanya Adeola, and Dervla Kirwan replaces Katherine Kelly as Miss Quill.

==== Volume 1 (2018) ====
No.	Title	Directed by	Written by	Featuring	Released
1	"Gifted"	Scott Handcock	Roy Gill	Ram, April	August 2018
2	"Life Experience"	Scott Handcock	Jenny T Colgan	Ram, Tanya	August 2018
3	"Tell Me You Love Me"	Scott Handcock	Scott Handcock	Charlie, Matteusz, Miss Quill	August 2018

==== Volume 2 (2018) ====
No.	Title	Directed by	Written by	Featuring	Released
1	"Everyone Loves Reagan"	Scott Handcock	Tim Foley	Ram, April, Tanya	August 2018
2	"Now You Know..."	Scott Handcock	Tim Leng	Tanya, Matteusz	August 2018
3	"In Remembrance"	Scott Handcock	Guy Adams	Charlie, Miss Quill, Ace, Daleks	August 2018

==== Volume 3 (2020) ====
No.	Title	Directed by	Written by	Featuring	Released
1	"The Soers' Ditch"	Scott Handcock	Carl Rowens	Charlie, April, Ram, Matteusz	April 2020
2	"Catfish"	Scott Handcock	Kate Thorman	Tanya, Charlie, April, Ram, Matteusz	April 2020
3	"Sweet Nothings"	Scott Handcock	Michael Dennis	Miss Quill, Charlie, Matteusz	April 2020

==== Volume 4 (2020) ====
No.	Title	Directed by	Written by	Featuring	Released
1	"Mock"	Scott Handcock	Alfie Shaw	Charlie, Miss Quill	April 2020
2	"The Creeper"	Scott Handcock	Lizzie Hopley	Matteusz, April, Charlie, Miss Quill	April 2020
3	"The Queen of Rhodia"	Scott Handcock	Blair Mowat	Charlie, Miss Quill	April 2020

==== Secret Diary of a Rhodian Prince (2023) ====
No.	Title	Directed by	Written by	Featuring	Released
–	"Secret Diary of a Rhodian Prince"	Scott Handcock	Blair Mowat	Charlie, Matteusz	January 2023
