= Jasmin Dizdar =

British-Bosnian film director, screenwriter and author (born 1961)

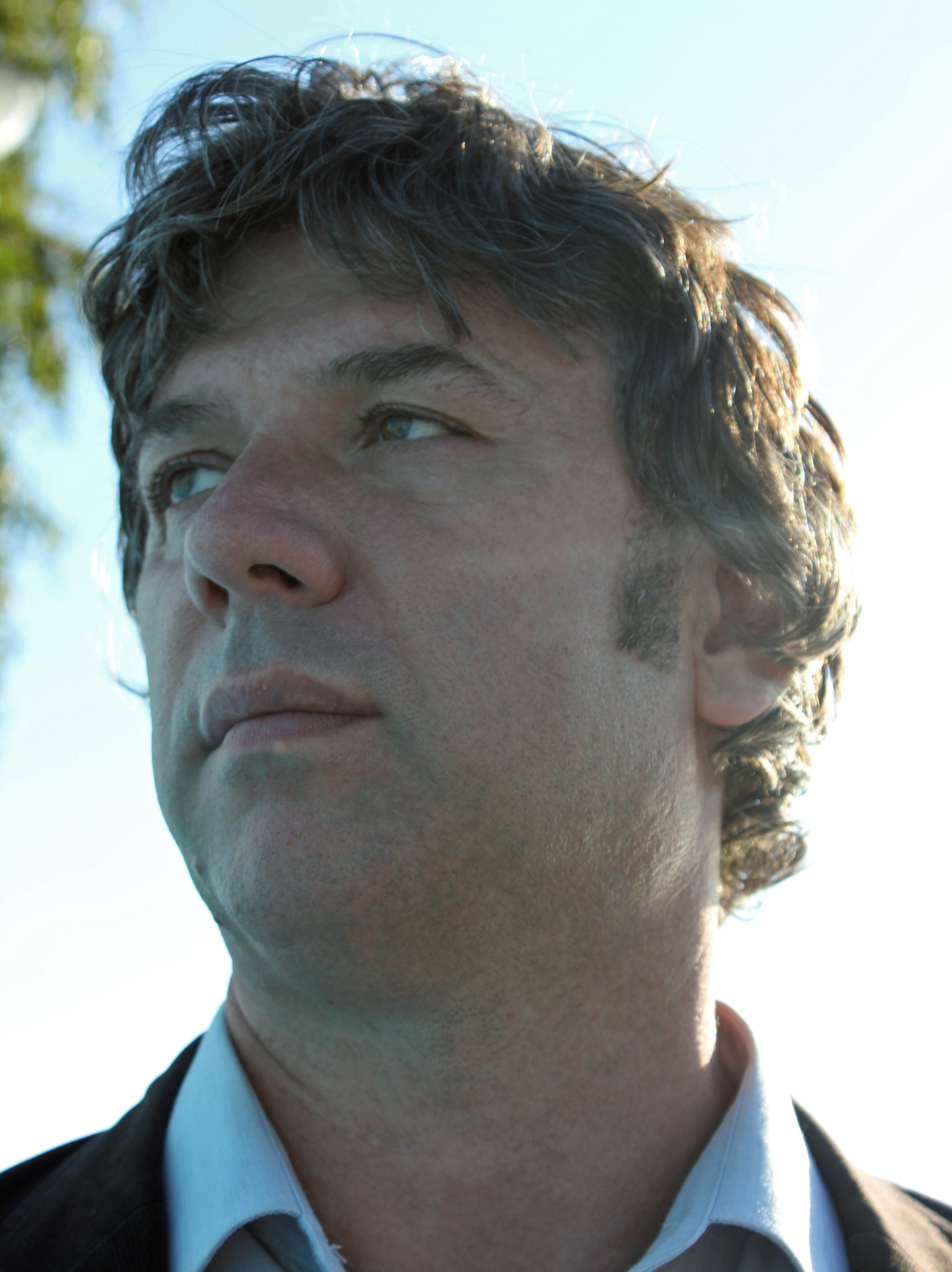
- Dizdar in 2015
- Born: 8 June 1961 (age 65); Zenica, SR Bosnia and Herzegovina, SFR Yugoslavia
- Education: Film and TV School of the Academy of Performing Arts in Prague
- Occupations: Film director, screenwriter, author

Jasmin Dizdar (born 8 June 1961) is a British-Bosnian film director, screenwriter and author known for his feature film Beautiful People (1999) and his World War II thriller Chosen (2016).

== Early life ==
Dizdar was born on 8 June 1961 and grew up in Zenica, Bosnia and Herzegovina. With the guidance and encouragement of his primary school literature teacher, he sent his short story “History Hour” to a regional competition and won an award for best short story.

During his time at secondary school, he was an actor in the Bosnian theatre play Hanka, based on the novel by Isak Samokovlija, as well as being adapted for the 1955 film Hanka directed by Yugoslav film director Slavko Vorkapić. The play premiered in Zenica's Old National Theatre.

As a teenager, Dizdar joined a local film club where he wrote, edited and directed short documentaries, drama and experimental films, and began to take interest in film theory, particularly Russian structuralist film theory. His last Bosnian film Butterfly Dance (featuring an ensemble cast from Zenica's National Theatre) got him into the Film and TV School of the Academy of Performing Arts in Prague, Czech Republic.

== Career ==
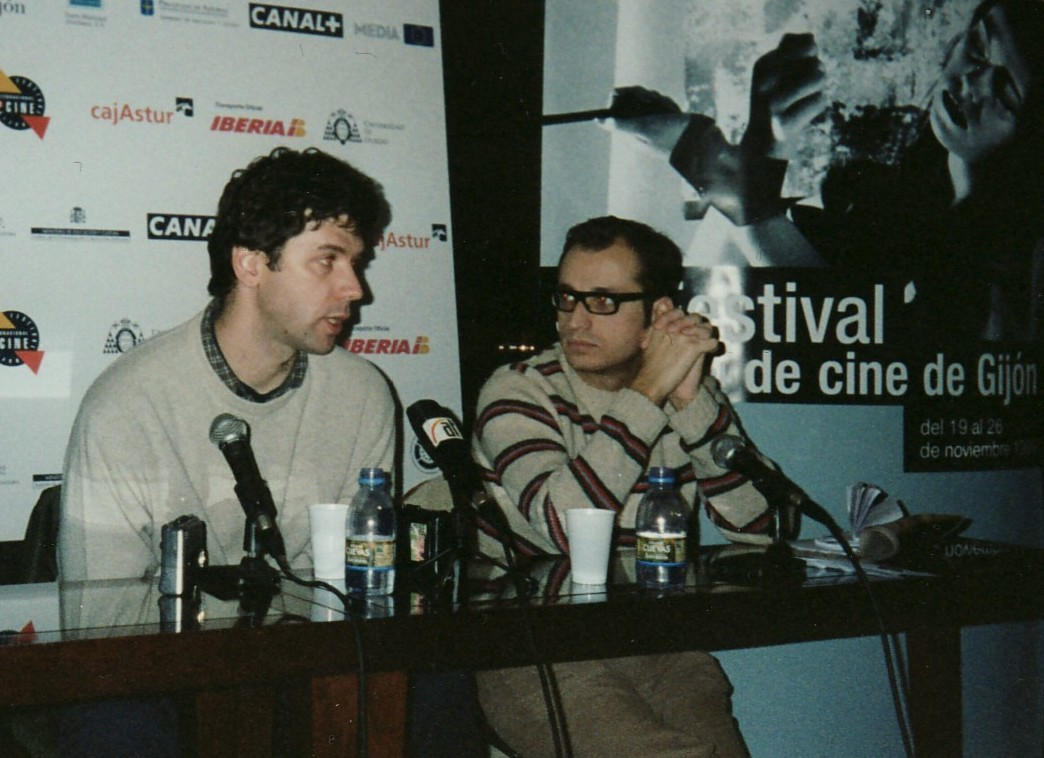
Dizdar at a press conference

Dizdar studied film directing at the Prague film school FAMU. His movies used satirical humour, often casting ordinary people, Czech actors and filmmakers who were not favored by the communist regime.

During his film studies, Dizdar wrote about director Miloš Forman, who was a fellow FAMU alumni banned by the state. His friendship with Czech cinematographer Miroslav Ondricek and film critic Eva Zaoralova led to the publication of Dizdar’s book about Forman, Audition for a Director.

After graduating from university with a Red Diploma, Dizdar spent some time in France before settling in the United Kingdom where he wrote a number of screenplays for BBC Television and a radio play for BBC Radio 4.

1999 saw the release of the feature film Beautiful People. The film won an award for the best film in Un Certain Regard category at the 1999 Cannes Film Festival, an audience award "Gold Gryphon" at Saint-Petersburg International Festival of Festivals, and many other international awards. Dizdar became the second Bosnian filmmaker to win a major award at the Cannes Film Festival - the first being Emir Kustkurica in 1985 - and the first Bosnian filmmaker from Zenica to do so.

Distributors in over 30 countries purchased the rights to Beautiful People.

Following Beautiful People, Dizdar wrote and directed a segment for the French feature film Les Européens (2006), discussing the social topic of refugees finding various ways to enter Europe. Dizdar's segment is about an African refugee who tries to smuggle himself into Europe by stowing away in the landing-gear bay of a passenger plane that departs from North Africa. When the landing-gear bay opens as the plane makes its descent, he tumbles out from a few thousand feet over Rome and falls on the car-roof of a middle-class religious woman who begins to believe that the refugee is a gift from God.

Dizdar’s next feature film, Chosen (2016), starred Harvey Keitel, Ana Ularu and Luke Mably and was a drama set during the Second World War and tells the story of a young lawyer who uses a ploy to fight the Nazis to save thousands of lives. Keitel plays the lawyer in present-day New York, USA.

== Personal life ==
As an adolescent, Dizdar discovered that his paternal grandparents were murdered by Nazis during the Second World War. A post-war orphanage changed his father's original surname from Dizdar to Dizdarević. After thirty years of living under the surname Dizdarević, he took back his grandfather’s original surname Dizdar.

Dizdar currently lives in London where he has been residing since 1989, and has been a UK citizen since 1993. He has a daughter who is also a filmmaker and visual artist.

== Filmography ==
- Butterfly Dance (1984)
- Mr Slave (1985)
- Crucifixion (1986)
- Heroes Will Be Heroes (1987)
- After Silence (1988)
- Our Sweet Homeland (1989)
- Beautiful People (1999)
- Les Europeens (2006)
- Chosen (2016)

== Other works ==
- Horseman (BBC, 1992) - television drama
- Intimate Tragedy (BBC, 1994) - radio drama
- Miloš Forman Audition for a Director

== Bibliography ==
- Yosefa Loshitzky: Screening Strangers
- Roger Ebert: The Ultimute Guide to the Best 1000 Modern Movies
- Andrew Horton: Screenwriting for a Global Market
