= Chosen (2016 film) =

- Film poster
- Directed by: Jasmin Dizdar
- Written by: Gabriel de Mercur
- Produced by: Michael Riley
- Starring: Luke Mably; Ana Ularu; Tomasz Aleksander; Jordan Renzo; Freddie Fuller; Sam Churchill; Luke Jerdy; Julian Shatkin; Harvey Keitel
- Cinematography: Balazs Bolygo
- Edited by: Kate Coggins
- Music by: Philip Sheppard
- Production company: Sterling Pictures
- Distributed by: Lionsgate, Kaleidoscope Film Distribution
- Release date: 2 August 2016
- Running time: 105 mins
- Country: United Kingdom
- Language: English

Chosen is a 2016 British drama film directed by Jasmin Dizdar. Filming for the movie took place in Romania and New York State.

== Synopsis ==
An unassuming young lawyer leads a fight against the Nazis near the end of the Second World War.

== Cast ==
- Luke Mably as Sonson
- Ana Ularu as Judith
- Tomasz Aleksander as Jeno
- Jordan Renzo as Robi
- Freddie Fuller as Zoltan
- Sam Churchill as Ezra
- Luke Jerdy as Efrahim
- Julian Shatkin as Max
- Harvey Keitel as Papi
- Diana Cavallioti as Florence
- Paul Ipate as Aronson

== Overview ==
The film is inspired by real events. It takes place in 1944 and is about a lawyer who fights Nazis during the Second World War. The Actor Harvey Keitel plays the lawyer in the present. The movie was shot in Bucharest, Romania, and Long Island, New York.

The screenplay is written by Gabriel de Mercur, and the film was directed by Jasmin Dizdar. It was produced by Michael Riley and co-produced by Tim Dennison. The film was published on DVD and shown on Video On Demand.

== Reviews ==
Phil Hoad from The Guardian believes that the film is unfocused and only scratches the surface.

Isabelle Milton thinks that the movie shows the brutality the Hungarian Jews had to face towards the end of the Second World War, but has nothing new to offer. She also mentions that during the movie the soundtrack is played distractingly at inappropriate moments. Furthermore she thinks that the character development is thin.

Ryan Izay Reviews thinks that there are several screenplay problems in the movie like plot-holes, cliché bookend sequences and familiarity to the narrative. However she also thinks that it features enough competent filmmaking to forgive these kinds of mistakes.
