= Bilal Hasna =

British actor (born 1999)

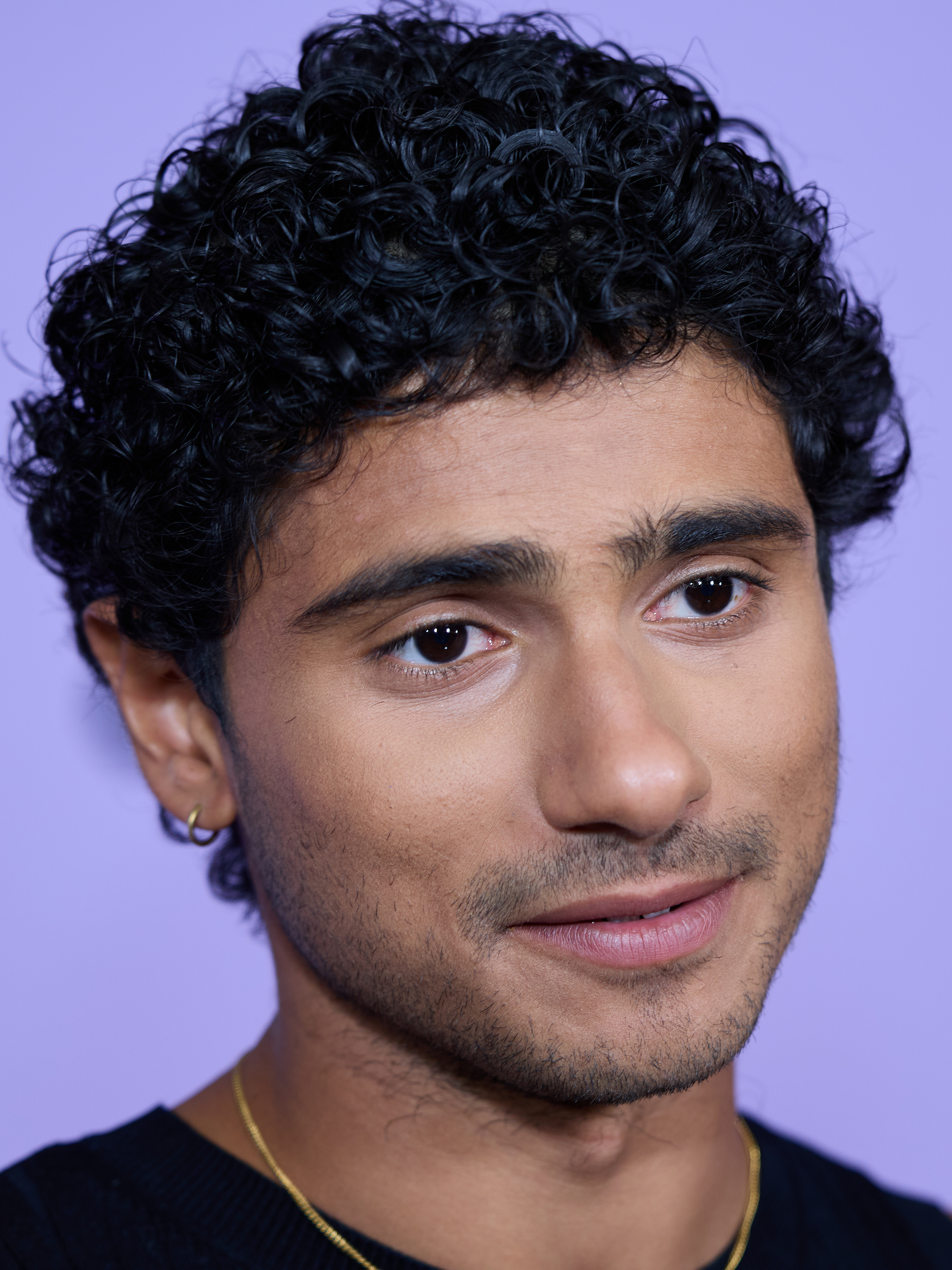
- Hasna at the 2024 Sundance Film Festival
- Born: Bilal Ali Hasna; 7 May 1999 (age 27); Westminster, London, England
- Education: Haberdashers' Boys' School; University of Cambridge
- Occupations: Actor; playwright
- Years active: 2020–present

Bilal Ali Hasna (/bɪˈlɑːl ˈhæsnə/ bil-AHL HASS-nə; born 7 May 1999) is a British actor and playwright. He starred in the film Layla (2024). On television, he is known for his roles in the Star series Extraordinary (2023–2024) and the Amazon Prime series Dead Hot (2024). For Extraordinary, Hasna was nominated for the 2025 British Academy Television Awards for Best Male Comedy Performance.

== Early life ==
Hasna was born in central London to a Palestinian father and a Pakistani Punjabi mother and grew up very close to his younger sister Imi Hasna. Bilal Hasna attended Haberdashers' Boys' School in Elstree. He graduated from the University of Cambridge in 2020 with a Bachelor of Arts in English Literature. During university, he participated in theatre with the Marlowe Society and Pembroke Players.

== Career ==
Having come up with the idea in 2021, Hasna co-wrote and starred in the one-man play For a Palestinian with Aaron Kilercioglu, which was staged in 2022 at Camden People's Theatre and also featured at the Bristol Old Vic.

After making appearances in Sparks and Screw, in 2023, Hasna had his first main television role as Kash in the Disney+ Star superhero comedy Extraordinary. He made his feature film debut as the titular character of Amrou Al-Kadhi's Layla. He joined the voice cast of the animated film The Lord of the Rings: The War of the Rohirrim. He also starred opposite Vivian Oparah in the Amazon Prime comedy thriller series Dead Hot in 2024.

== Filmography ==
Key
†	Denotes works that have not yet been released

=== Film ===
Year	Title	Role	Notes
2024	Layla	Layla	
2024	The Lord of the Rings: The War of the Rohirrim	Lief	Voice role
2025	Christmas Karma	Eddie Sood	
TBA	Rule of Three †	TBA	
TBA	Monsanto †	TBA	

=== Television ===
Year	Title	Role	Notes
2020	Sparks	Shahid	Episode: "Shahid's First Shave"
2022	Screw	DS Norris	1 episode
2023–2024	Extraordinary	Kash	Main role
2024	3 Body Problem	Edgar	3 episodes
2024	Dead Hot	Elliott	Main role
2024–present	The Agency	Simon	17 episodes
2025	Black Mirror	Kris El Masry	Episode: "USS Callister: Into Infinity"
2025	Slow Horses	Irfan	2 episodes
2026	Half Man	Young Alby Safadi	2 episodes
2026	Good Omens	Jesus	Series 3

=== Theatre ===
Year	Title	Role	Notes
2022	For a Palestinian	Bilal/Wa'el Zuaiter	Camden People's Theatre/Bristol Old Vic
