= Con O'Neill (actor) =

English actor (born 1966)

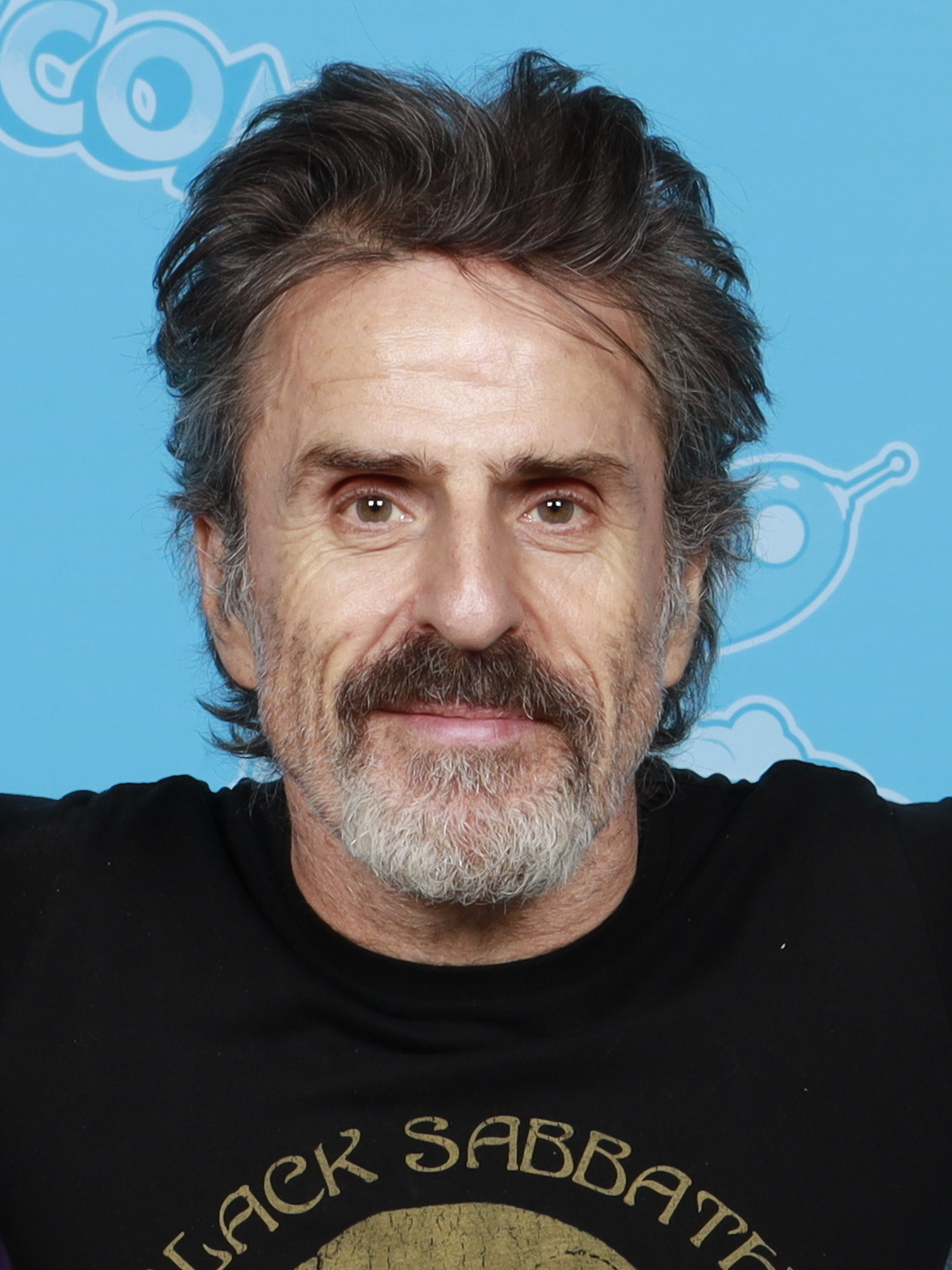
- O'Neill at GalaxyCon Raleigh in 2024
- Born: Robert O'Neill; 15 August 1966 (age 60); Weston-super-Mare, England
- Occupation: Actor
- Years active: 1983–present

Con O'Neill (born Robert O'Neill; 15 August 1966) is an English actor. He started his acting career at the Everyman Theatre and became primarily known for his performances in musicals. He received critical acclaim and won a Laurence Olivier Award in 1988 for his performance as Michael "Mickey" Johnstone in the musical Blood Brothers. When the production was staged on Broadway in 1993, he was nominated for a Tony Award and a Drama Desk Award for the same role. He has also appeared in many films and television series, including Chernobyl, The Batman and Our Flag Means Death.

== Early life ==
O'Neill was born on 15 August 1966 in Weston-super-Mare, Somerset to Irish parents. Aged one, O'Neill moved with his family to Parbold, growing up in the village of Up Holland, both near Wigan, in Lancashire. He attended St Peter's Roman Catholic High School in Wigan.

== Career ==
O'Neill began his acting career at Liverpool's Everyman Youth Theatre.

He was awarded the Laurence Olivier Award for Best Actor in a Musical in 1988 for his performance in Willy Russell's Blood Brothers, and was nominated for Broadway's 1993 Tony Award for Best Actor in a Musical for Blood Brothers.

In the 1980s, he had a walk-on role in One Summer as Jackson. He starred in Dancin' Thru the Dark, the 1990 film adaptation of Willy Russell's Stags and Hens. In 1990, he played a principal role in Amongst Barbarians, part of the BBC ScreenPlay series. In 1992, he played Cougar Glass in the world premiere of Philip Ridley's The Fastest Clock in the Universe. He appeared in Moving Story, a TV comedy drama, as Nick, part of a removals team. He appeared as wheelchair user PC Ian LeFebre in "The Mild Bunch", the second season's eighth episode of Pie in the Sky (1995). He had a supporting role in Cider with Rosie (1998). In 2003, he portrayed Mickey in The Illustrated Mum. In 2006, he starred as Aston in a tour of Sheffield theatres' production of Harold Pinter's The Caretaker. In 1999, he starred in The Last Seduction II.

In 2008, he appeared in Criminal Justice, a five-part TV drama on the BBC, playing the part of Ralph Stone, a solicitor. He played the part of Joe Meek in both the 2008 film and 2005 play of Telstar: The Joe Meek Story. In 2011, he took the role of dock worker Eddie Carbone in Arthur Miller's A View From the Bridge at the Royal Exchange Theatre in Manchester (from 18 May to 25 June 2011). This portrayal won the 2011 Manchester Theatre Award for Best Actor. In 2012, he played Dr. Bob Massey in "Fearful Symmetry", S6:E3 of Lewis. Also in 2011, he played Matty Snr in Bash Street, written and directed by Ed Deedigan and distributed by Kandu Arts.

He played St. Paul in the 2013 miniseries The Bible. The same year he also appeared in Life of Crime as DCI Ferguson and in Midsomer Murders "Schooled in Murder" as Jim Caxton. He portrays Val Pearson in the sitcom Uncle (2014 to 2017). He played Cliff in Cucumber, an eight-part TV drama series. In 2015, he starred in the 35th-anniversary staging of Willy Russell's Educating Rita at The Liverpool Playhouse. He appears as Neil Ackroyd in the second and third series of Happy Valley. In 2016, O'Neill played the part of Joe Brierley in the second series of Ordinary Lies and appeared in two episodes of the Doctor Who spin-off Class. In the 2019 HBO miniseries Chernobyl he portrayed the plant director Viktor Bryukhanov. In 2022 and 2023, he appeared in the HBO series Our Flag Means Death as the pirate Izzy Hands.

O'Neill portrays Gotham City Police Department's Chief Mackenzie Bock in minor roles for both the feature film, The Batman (2022) and its follow-up TV miniseries, The Penguin (2024).

== Filmography ==
=== Film ===
Year	Title	Role	Notes
1990	Dancin' Thru the Dark	Peter McGeghan	
1996	Scarborough Ahoy!	Michael	Short film
1998	Bedrooms and Hallways	Terry	
1999	The Last Seduction II	Troy Fenton	
2001	Persephone's Playground	Father	Short films
2001	Watchmen	Burglar	Short films
2005	What's Your Name 41?	Sam Clarke	
2008	Telstar: The Joe Meek Story	Joe Meek	
2010	The Kid	Dennis	
2011	Bash Street	Matty Snr.	
2011	The Send Off	John	Short film
2012	Frank	Fidel	
2013	Mark	Mark	Short film
2017	Riot	Patrick	
2018	Isabella	Michael	Short films
2018	The Pen	John	Short films
2019	Stilts	Father	Short films
2021	Vengeance Is Mine	Harry Kane	
2021	Pork Scratchings	Rob	Short film
2022	The Batman	Chief Mackenzie Bock	
2022	The Outing	Frank	Short film
2026	Pressure	Trafford Leigh-Mallory	
TBA	The Way of the Wind	Enoch	Post-production

=== Television ===
Year	Title	Role	Notes
1983	One Summer	Jackson	Mini-series; Episodes 1 & 4 (Credited as Robert O'Neill)
1984	Travelling Man	Peter	Series 1; Episode 3: "The Watcher"
1984	Brookside	Leggers	Episode 199: "Ideal Tenant"
1986	Brookside	Joe Cleary	Episode 335: "Difference of Opinion"
1989	The Bill	Ricky Denball	Series 5; Episode 4: "The Mugging and the Gypsies"
1989	Norbert Smith: A Life	Davy Throb	Television film
1990	ScreenPlay	Ralph	Series 5; Episode 1: "Amongst Barbarians"
1990	The Lilac Bus	Tom	Television film adaptation of the Maeve Binchy book, The Lilac Bus
1991	Inspector Morse	Paul Matthews	Series 5; Episode 5: "Promised Land"
1993	Casualty	Denis Simpson	Series 7; Episode 19: "Getting Involved"
1993	The Riff Raff Element	Jed	Series 1; Episodes 1 & 3
1994–1995	Moving Story	Nick	Main cast. Series 1 & 2; 13 episodes
1995	3 Steps to Heaven	Angel Farnham	Television film
1995	Pie in the Sky	PC Ian Lefebvre	Series 2; Episode 8: "The Mild Bunch"
1995	The Perfect Match	Phil	Television film
1996	Soldier Soldier	C/Sgt. Robert Hicks	Series 6; Episode 9: "Asking for It"
1997	Wycliffe	Ben Walker	Series 4; Episode 4: "Lone Voyager"
1997	The History of Tom Jones: a Foundling	Captain Blifil	Mini-series; Episode 1
1997	Heartbeat	Rex Hawkins	Series 7; Episode 16: "The Queen’s Message"
1997	Peak Practice	Nick Gillespie	Series 5; Episode 6: "Lost Feeling"
1998	Cider with Rosie	Uncle Ray	Television film
1999	Always and Everyone	Kenny Fletcher	Series 1; 4 episodes
1999	Real Women	Jo	Series 1 & 2; 5 episodes
2001	Waking the Dead	Colm Hare	Series 1; Episodes 5 & 6: "The Blind Beggar: Parts 1 & 2"
2002	Trial & Retribution	Alan Brickman	Series 6; Episodes 1 & 2: "Trial & Retribution VI: Parts One & Two"
2003	In Deep	Terry	Series 3; Episodes 3 7 4: "Queen and Country: Parts 1 & 2"
2003	Doctors	Adam Jamison	Series 5; Episode 122: "How's This My Problem?"
2003	The Illustrated Mum	Mickey	Television film
2004	Murder City	Spencer Grieves	Series 1; Episode 4: "Mr. Right"
2004	Wipe Out	Dad	Television film
2005	My Hero	Martin	Series 5; Episode 9: "Big Brother"
2005	The Stepfather	Bruce Shapiro	Television film
2005	Ultimate Force	Lavelle	Series 3; Episode 4: "Weapon of Choice"
2007	Learners	Gerry	Television film
2008	Criminal Justice	Ralph Stone	Series 1; Episodes 1–5
2009	Margot	Tito	Television film
2011	Postcode	Clive Viper	Television short film
2012	Uncle	Gwen's Dad	Pilot episode for the series, Uncle
2012	Lewis	Dr. Bob Massey	Series 6; Episode 3: "Fearful Symmetry"
2012	Wallander	Jan Petrus	Series 3; Episode 1: "An Event in Autumn"
2012	Coming Up	Jed Sullivan	Series 10; Episode 5: "Postcode Lottery"
2013	Midsomer Murders	Jim Caxton	Series 15; Episode 6: "Schooled in Murder"
2013	The Bible	Paul	Mini-series; Episode 10: "Courage"
2013	Life of Crime	DCI Ferguson	Mini-series; Episodes 1 & 2
2014–2017	Uncle	Val	Series 1–3; 11 episodes
2015	Banana	Cliff Costello	Mini-series; Episode 2
2015	Cucumber	Cliff Costello	Mini-series; 5 episodes
2016	The Tunnel	Neil Grey	Series 2; Episodes 6–8
2016	Class	Huw MacLean	Episodes 4 & 5: "Co-Owner of a Lonely Heart" and "Brave-ish Heart"
2016	Ordinary Lies	Joe Brierley	Series 2; Episodes 1–6
2016–2023	Happy Valley	Neil Ackroyd	Series 2 & 3; 11 episodes
2017	Harlots	Nathaniel Lennox	Series 1; Episodes 2 & 3
2018	Urban Myths	Tony	Series 2; Episode 2: "Backstage at Live Aid"
2019	Cleaning Up	Graham	Episodes 3, 4 & 6
2019	Queens of Mystery	Len Savage	Series 1; Episodes 3 & 4: "Death by Vinyl: First & Final Chapters"
2019	Chernobyl	Viktor Bryukhanov	Mini-series; 3 episodes
2019	Wild Bill	Ray Gilchrist	Mini-series; Episode 4: "Bad Blood in the Soil"
2019	Ladhood	Mr. Stones	Series 1; Episode 3: "Down Days"
2020	COBRA	Harry Rowntree	Series 1; Episodes 3–6
2022	Without Sin	Roman McKeller	Mini-series; Episodes 3 & 4
2022–2023	Our Flag Means Death	Izzy Hands	Main role. Series 1 & 2; 16 episodes
2023	Nolly	Jack Barton	Mini-series; Episodes 1–3
2024	Time Bandits	Sheriff of Nottingham	Episode 3: "Medieval"
2024	The Penguin	Chief Mackenzie Bock	Mini-series; Episodes: "Homecoming" and "A Great or Little Thing"
2024	SAS: Rogue Heroes	General Montgomery	Series 2; Episodes 5 & 6
2026	Legends		

=== Video games ===
Year	Title	Role	Notes
2014	Dark Souls II	Titchy Gren (voice)	
2022	Elden Ring	Mohg (voice)	

=== Accolades ===
Year	Award	Category	Nominee(s)	Result	Ref.
2022	Peabody Awards	Entertainment	Our Flag Means Death	Nominated	
