= List of awards and nominations received by Katherine Kelly =

Katherine Kelly awards and nominations
Awards and nominations
Award	Wins	Nominations
All About Soap Awards	1	2
British Soap Awards	2	9
Inside Soap Awards	0	5
National TV Awards	1	6
Royal Television Society	0	2
TRIC Awards	1	0
TV Choice Awards	1	2
TV Now Awards	3	0
TVTimes Awards	1	3
Other Awards	3	5

Totals (Note: Certain award groups do not simply award one winner. They acknowledge several different recipients, have runners-up, and have third place. Since this is a specific recognition and is different from losing an award, runner-up mentions are considered wins in this award tally. For simplification and to avoid errors, each award in this list has been presumed to have had a prior nomination.)
- Wins: 13
- Nominations: 34

English actress Katherine Kelly has won awards for her work, most notably her portrayal of Becky McDonald in the ITV soap opera Coronation Street, including one National TV Award, two British Soap Awards and one TRIC Award.

== All About Soap Awards ==
Year	Category	Nominated for	Result	Ref.
2010	Bride & Doom' (with Simon Gregson)	Coronation Street	Won	
2010	Celeb Style	Coronation Street	Nominated	
2011	Best Actress	Coronation Street	Nominated	

== British Soap Awards ==
Year	Category	Nominated for	Result	Ref.
2008	Best Actress	Coronation Street	Nominated	
2008	Best Comedy Performance	Coronation Street	Nominated	
2008	Best On-Screen Partnership (with David Neilson)	Coronation Street	Nominated	
2009	Best Actress	Coronation Street	Won	
2009	Best On-Screen Partnership with (Simon Gregson)	Coronation Street	Nominated	
2009	Sexiest Female	Coronation Street	Nominated	
2010	Best Actress	Coronation Street	Nominated	
2010	Best On-Screen Partnership (with Simon Gregson)	Coronation Street	Nominated	
2011	Best Actress	Coronation Street	Nominated	
2011	Best On-Screen Partnership (with Simon Gregson)	Coronation Street	Nominated	
2012	Best Exit	Coronation Street	Won	

== Inside Soap Awards ==
Year	Category	Nominated for	Result	Ref.
2010	Best Actress	Coronation Street	Shortlisted	
2010	Best Wedding (with Simon Gregson)	Coronation Street	Shortlisted	
2011	Best Actress	Coronation Street	Shortlisted	
2011	Best Dramatic Performance	Coronation Street	Nominated	
2011	Best Wedding (with Simon Gregson)	Coronation Street	Nominated	

== National Television Awards ==
Year	Category	Nominated for	Result	Ref.
2008	Outstanding Serial Drama Performance	Coronation Street	Shortlisted	
2010	Outstanding Serial Drama Performance	Coronation Street	Shortlisted	
2011	Outstanding Serial Drama Performance	Coronation Street	Shortlisted	
2012	Outstanding Serial Drama Performance	Coronation Street	Won	
2014	Drama Performance	Mr Selfridge	Longlisted	
2015	Drama Performance	Mr Selfridge	Longlisted	
2019	Drama Performance	Cheat	Longlisted	

== Royal Television Society ==
=== North West Awards ===
Year	Category	Nominated for	Result	Ref.
2008	Best Performance in a Continuing Drama	Coronation Street	Nominated	
2009	Best Performance in a Continuing Drama	Coronation Street	Nominated	

== TRIC Awards ==
Year	Category	Nominated for	Result	Ref.
2009	TV Soap Personality	Coronation Street	Won	

== TV Choice Awards ==
Year	Category	Nominated for	Result	Ref.
2009	Best Soap Actress	Coronation Street	Won	
2010	Best Soap Actress	Coronation Street	Shortlisted	
2011	Best Soap Actress	Coronation Street	Shortlisted	

== TV Now Awards ==
Year	Category	Nominated for	Result	Ref.
2009	Favourite Soap Couple (with Simon Gregson)	Coronation Street	Won	
2009	Favourite Soap Female	Coronation Street	Won	
2010	Favourite Soap Female	Coronation Street	Won	

== TVTimes Awards ==
Year	Category	Nominated for	Result	Ref.
2008	Editor's Star of the Year	Coronation Street	Won	
2009	Favourite Double Act (with Simon Gregson)	Coronation Street	Nominated	
2009	Favourite Soap Star	Coronation Street	Nominated	
2010	Favourite Soap Star	Coronation Street	Nominated	

== Other Awards ==
=== Media Awards ===
Year	Award	Category	Nominated for	Result	Ref.
2010	The Maggies	Best Entertainment Cover	Herself (on Radio Times cover)	Nominated	
2011	Digital Spy Awards	Best Actress	Coronation Street	Nominated	
2014	Glamour Awards	UK TV Actress	Mr Selfridge	Nominated	
2019	I Talk Telly Awards	Best Dramatic Partnership (with Molly Windsor)	Cheat	Nominated	
2020	BBC Audio Drama Awards	Best Actress	A Badge	Shortlisted	

=== Civic Awards ===
Year	Award	Category	Nominated for	Result	Ref.
2013	Yorkshire Society Awards	Yorkshire Woman of the Year	Herself	Won	
2016	Wakefield Council	Wakefield Star	Herself	Won	
2022	Barnsley Council	Freedom of the Borough	Herself	Won	

- Kelly was also a previous recipient of Unsung Hero Award at Proud of Barnsley awards.
