= Dead Hot =

British Television series

- Genre: Comedy thriller
- Created by: Charlotte Coben
- Starring: Bilal Hasna; Vivian Oparah; Penelope Wilton; Peter Serafinowicz
- Country of origin: United Kingdom
- Original language: English
- No. of series: 1
- No. of episodes: 6

Production
- Executive producers: Nicola Shindler; Charlotte Coben
- Producer: Laurie Kirkham
- Production companies: Quay Street Productions; Amazon MGM Studios

Original release
- Network: Amazon Prime Video
- Release: 1 March 2024

Dead Hot is a British comedy thriller television series created by Charlotte Coben for Amazon Prime Video. The series premiered in the UK and Ireland on 1 March 2024, and in the US and Canada on Tubi on 27 March 2024.

== Synopsis ==
Elliott and Jess are both grieving the disappearance five years previous of Peter, Jess' twin brother and the love of Elliott's life.

== Cast ==
- Bilal Hasna as Elliott
- Vivian Oparah as Jess
- Penelope Wilton as Francine
- Peter Serafinowicz as Danny

=== Recurring ===
- Olisa Odele as Peter
- Marcus Hodson as Will
- Rosie Cavaliero as Bonnie
- Rachael Elizabeth as Janelle
- Rebekah Murrell as Tina
- Yannisyn Sanches as Nico
- Alan Turkington as Timothy
- Andro Cowperthwaite as Raphael
- Brandon Fellows as Charlie
- Jaylin Ye as Karis
- James Ledsham as Rigby
- Rachael Evelyn as Honeysuckle
- Erin Austen as Piana
- Charlie Griffiths as Jemma Ridgewell
- Daniel Monks as Eugene Krumlish
- Daniel Duffy as Gang Boy

=== Notable Mention ===
- Evan Rossington as Jimmy (episode 3)

== Episodes ==
No.	Title	Directed by	Written by	Original release date
1	"Episode 1"	Sam Arbor	Charlotte Coben	1 March 2024
2	"Episode 2"	Sam Arbor	Charlotte Coben	1 March 2024
3	"Episode 3"	Sam Arbor	Charlotte Coben	1 March 2024
4	"Episode 4"	David Sant	Charlotte Coben	1 March 2024
5	"Episode 5"	David Sant	Charlotte Coben	1 March 2024
6	"Episode 6"	David Sant	Charlotte Coben	1 March 2024

== Production ==
The series was commissioned by Amazon Prime Video in 2023, written, created, and executive produced by Charlotte Coben, and executive produced by Nicola Shindler for Quay Street Productions.

=== Casting ===
Hasna, Serefanowitz and Wilton were revealed in the cast in August 2023.

=== Filming ===
Set in Liverpool, filming got underway in the summer of 2023 in the North West of England.

== Broadcast ==
The series was broadcast on Amazon Prime Video in the United Kingdom and Ireland on 1 March 2024.

The programme streams in Canada via Tubi.
