= Nigel Betts =

British actor

Nigel Betts is an English actor, who in 2003 and 2007 appeared on the ITV soap opera Emmerdale as Eddie Hope. He also portrayed Tony in the BBC Two sitcom Boy Meets Girl and had a recurring role as Mr Armitage in the eighth series of Doctor Who as well as in Class, a Doctor Who spin-off.

Betts has also appeared in several other British television programmes such as Downton Abbey, Doctors, EastEnders, Holby City, Coronation Street, The Bill, Ridley Road, and the much acclaimed ITV series, Sharpe. He also played a singing bartender in an episode of the sitcom As Time Goes By and Steve Taylor's laconic neighbor in an episode of the sitcom Coupling. In 2016 he appeared as Brian Teddern in The Coroner, S2:E5 “The Captain’s Pipe”. In 2009 he played Tommy in the eighth episode of the fourth series of Doc Martin.

Betts has also numerous theatre credits including playing an assortment of roles for the Royal Shakespeare Company, including playing a variety of successful characters in the RSC's Gunpowder season. Other theatre credits include The 39 Steps, a British play adapted from the 1915 novel by John Buchan and the 1935 film by Alfred Hitchcock, and Arthur in War Horse, the National Theatre's award-winning show in the West End. In September 2019, he appeared in an episode of the BBC soap opera Doctors as Elton Summertree. He appeared again in 2024, this time in the role of Mellie Tyler.

Another role he stars in is the credited voice for the character Gosetsu Daito in Final Fantasy XIV: Heavensward, and it's sequel expansion, Final Fantasy XIV: Stormblood.
