= Paul Marc Davis =

British actor

- Born: 16 April 1974 (age 52); Barking, London, England, UK
- Occupations: Actor, film producer
- Years active: 2001–present

Paul Marc Davis (born 16 April 1974) is a British actor who has appeared on Doctor Who (the episode "Utopia") and three of its spin-off series: Torchwood ("Exit Wounds"), The Sarah Jane Adventures (as recurring villain "The Trickster"), and Class (as recurring villain Corakinus). He was also an executive producer on Sports Day 3D.

== Life and career ==
Davis was born in London. He studied Fine Art and was a professional Sculptor for 12 years.

He is best known for his design of the Gramophone International Classical Music Award, an award regarded as the highest accolade for Classical Music and has Luciano Pavarotti among its recipients. Paul was awarded The Association of British Artists Award for Sculpture in 1996 and was shortlisted for The National association of British Sculptors award in 1998.

In 2001, after a chance meeting, he was offered the lead in a Channel Four film about the life of Casanova. In the same year he played the ghost of the Cavalier in Harry Potter and the Philosopher’s Stone. Over the next few years Davis played leads in many independent films and in 2007 was cast in Doctor Who, The Sarah Jane Adventures and Torchwood. Other roles include playing alongside Colin Farrell in Woody Allen's Cassandra's Dream.

== Filmography ==
=== Film ===
Year	Title	Role
2001	Harry Potter and the Philosopher's Stone	Ghost of the Cavalier
2003	Sinister	Carlos
2005	Quality Indigo	Norman Kehoe
2005	Personal Justice	Lara's Boyfriend
2006	Still Living	Man
2007	Three Minute Moments	Marcus
2007	Cassandra's Dream	Poker Player
2007	The Seer	Adam
2009	Barry Brown	Rodolfo
2009	Hardly Bear to Look at You	Alex
2010	Dear Darkness	The Husband
2010	The Symmetry of Love	Wedding guy 1
2011	Diagnosis Superstar	Denny
2011	The Sky in Bloom	The Driver
2014	Son of God	Simon

=== Television ===
Year	Title	Role	Notes
2003	The Real Casanova	Casanova	TV movie
2007	Doctor Who	Futurekind Chieftain	Episode: "Utopia"
2007	EastEnders	Sam	
2008	Torchwood	Cowled Leader	Episode: "Exit Wounds"
2007–2009	The Sarah Jane Adventures	The Trickster	6 episodes
2013	The Bible	Simon the Pharisee	2 episodes
2016	Class	Corakinus	4 episodes
