= Jordan Renzo =

Actor (born 1993)

- Born: 11 February 1993 (age 33); London, United Kingdom
- Education: Guildhall School of Music and Drama
- Years active: 2014–present

Jordan Renzo (born 11 February 1993) is a British-born actor known for his roles as Matteusz Andrzejewski in the BBC Three Doctor Who spin-off Class (2016) and Charles Brandon in the Starz historical drama The Spanish Princess (2019–2020).

== Early life ==
Renzo was born in London and grew up in California. He attended the Guildhall School of Music and Drama. In February 2014, during his final year, Renzo played the titular role of Henry V. He is also a tenor and has practised stage combat.

== Career ==
In 2015, Renzo starred in short drama Ella. The following year, he made his feature film debut in the World War II film Chosen and his television debut as Matteusz Andrzejewski in the BBC Three Doctor Who spin-off Class. Renzo said that playing a gay character was made "quite easy" with the help of his co-star Greg Austin, and that their relationship was no different than the other relationships in the show. Despite not being credited in the opening credits of the series, Renzo's character was advertised as a series regular by the BBC multiple times. In 2018, Renzo reprised his role as Matteusz in six audio plays by Big Finish.

It was announced in 2018 that Renzo would star as Charles Brandon in the Starz historical drama miniseries The Spanish Princess, which premiered in 2019 followed by a part two in 2020. Also in 2019, Renzo guest starred in an episode of the Netflix fantasy series The Witcher. The following year, he appeared in an installment of the Apple TV+ anthology Little America and the Irish horror film Boys from County Hell.

== Filmography ==
=== Film ===
Year	Title	Role	Notes
2015	Ella	Chuck	Short film
2016	Troubled	Johnny	Short film
2016	Chosen	Robi	
2019	Boys from County Hell	Christian	
2024	The Flight of Bryan	Bryan Allen	Documentary

=== Television ===
Year	Title	Role	Notes
2016	Class	Matteusz Andrzejewski	Recurring cast (7 episodes)
2019–2020	The Spanish Princess	Charlie Brandon	Miniseries
2019	The Witcher	Sir Eyck of Denesle	Episode 6: "Rare Species"
2020	Little America	Christopher	Episode 8: "The Son"
2022	A Royal Corgi Christmas	Prince Edmond	Television film

=== Audio ===
Year	Title	Role	Notes
2018-2020	Class	Matteusz Andrzejewski	8 episodes

=== Game ===
Year	Title	Role	Notes
2022	Horizon Forbidden West	Hank Shaw	Additional Voices (Synchronisation)
