= Vivian Oparah =

British actress (born 1996)

- Born: 30 December 1996 (age 29)
- Years active: 2016–present
- Known for: Class; Dead Hot

Vivian Nneka O. Oparah (born 30 December 1996) is a British actress and musician. For her performance in the film Rye Lane (2023), she won a British Independent Film Award and received a British Academy Film Award nomination. On television, she is known for her roles in the BBC Three Doctor Who spin-off Class (2016) and the Amazon Prime series Dead Hot (2024).

== Early life ==
Oparah was born in Camden and grew up in Tottenham, London. She attended The Latymer School, where she took A Levels in media, English literature, product design and biology. During her media coursework in 2014, she formed a band called NTLS along with other students. Their debut single and video Heart Skipped a Beat was uploaded by someone to YouTube. Her older brother also works in music. Oparah joined the National Youth Theatre, where she did a two-week summer course.

== Career ==
While deferring her acceptance to UCL, Oparah was cast in the BBC Three Doctor Who spin-off Class as Tanya Adeola, marking her television debut. Oparah later said that Class was her first audition. When she auditioned she only knew that the series was linked to the Doctor Who universe, but she did not imagine that it was such a big production until she got the job and started filming. During the production of the series Oparah lived in Cardiff, in the same building as actress Sophie Hopkins.

Oparah named an Emerging Talent at the 2017 Screen Nation Film and Television Awards. That same year, she starred as Minnie in the play An Octoroon at the Orange Tree Theatre in Richmond. She was nominated for the 2017 Offie for Best Supporting Female in a Play (An Octoroon). In 2018, Oparah reprised her role as Tanya in six audio plays by Big Finish and made her feature film debut in Teen Spirit.

In 2020, Oparah appeared in an episode of the BBC One miniseries I May Destroy You as well as the second series of the BBC Three comedy-drama Enterprice. She starred opposite David Jonsson in the romantic comedy Rye Lane, which opened at the 2023 Sundance Film Festival to critical acclaim. Also in 2023, she had a main role in the Sky Max drama Then You Run. She has an upcoming lead role opposite Bilal Hasna in the Amazon Prime comedy thriller series Dead Hot.

== Filmography ==
=== Film ===
Year	Title	Role	Notes
2018	Teen Spirit	Kelli	
2019	Pagans	Viv	Short film
2019	Signs	Ade	Short film
2023	Rye Lane	Yas	

=== Television ===
Year	Title	Role	Notes
2016	Class	Tanya Adeola	Main role (8 episodes)
2017	The Rebel	Amaya	Series regular (5 episodes)
2020	I May Destroy You	Bisola	Episode: "Happy Animals"
2020	Enterprice	Isha	3 Episodes
2021	Intelligence	Honey	1 episode
2023	Then You Run	Stink	
2024	Dead Hot	Jess	

=== Audio ===
Year	Title	Role	Notes
2018	Class: The Audio Adventures	Tanya Adeola	Big Finish Productions
2024	The Mysterious Affair at Styles	Cynthia Murdoch	Audible original

== Stage ==
Year	Title	Role	Notes
2017	An Octoroon	Minnie	Orange Tree Theatre, Richmond
2018	Fanny & Alexander	Mej	Old Vic, London
2018	An Octoroon	Minnie	Royal National Theatre (Dorfman), London

== Awards and nominations ==
Year	Award	Category	Work	Result	Ref.
2023	British Independent Film Awards	Best Joint Lead Performance (shared with David Jonsson)	Rye Lane	Nominated	
2023	British Independent Film Awards	Breakthrough Performance	Rye Lane	Won	
2024	British Academy Film Awards	Best Actress in a Leading Role	Rye Lane	Nominated	
