= Sophie Hopkins =

British actress and model

- Born: Sophie Lisa Hopkins; 25 November 1990 (age 35); Singapore
- Education: Identity School of Acting
- Years active: 2009–present
- Known for: Class

Sophie Lisa Hopkins is a British actress and model. She is best known for her role as April MacLean in the BBC Three Doctor Who spin-off Class (2016).

== Early life ==
Hopkins was born in Singapore and grew up in the East Yorkshire Wolds, England. She attended Woldgate School and then pursued a national diploma in Performing Arts and Musical Theatre at City of York College, graduating in 2009. In 2010, she moved to London where she trained with Identity School of Acting and joined the Fourth Monkey Theatre Company.

== Career ==
In April 2016, Hopkins was cast in the BBC Three Doctor Who spin-off Class as April MacLean. Her character April is a student at Coal Hill School, who Hopkins described as "socially awkward", but also "compassionate, kind", and sometimes "extraordinarily brave". April was advertised as the British Buffy. When Hopkins was first sent the script, she only knew that the series would be similar to Buffy the Vampire Slayer and decided to audition on that basis, unaware that it would be a Doctor Who spin off. During the production of the series Hopkins lived in Cardiff, in the same building as actress Vivian Oparah.

Also in 2016, Hopkins made her feature film debut starring in the horror-thriller Brackenmore, set in Ireland. In 2018, Hopkins reprised her role as April MacLean in six Class audio plays by Big Finish. She then appeared in Greta Bellamacina's 2019 film Hurt by Paradise. In 2020, she participated in the Trickster virtual live readings to raise money for the NHS during the COVID-19 pandemic. She then appeared in an episode of the Sky Max series Wolfe and the Hallmark Channel film Jolly Good Christmas. She has an upcoming role in the ITV series The Long Shadow.

== Filmography ==
=== Film ===
| Year | Title | Role | Notes |
|---|---|---|---|
| 2011 | The Meeting Place | Anna | Short film |
| 2013 | The Square Orbit | Woman | Short film |
| 2014 | Life Lines | Mori | Short film |
| 2015 | Dead Gigolo | Jamie | Short film |
| 2015 | Fragments of May | Sophie | Short film |
| 2016 | Since We Last | Harry | Short film |
| 2016 | Breaking | Sarah | Short film |
| 2016 | Brackenmore | Kate | |
| 2017 | Spilt | Billie | Short film |
| 2019 | Hurt by Paradise | Camille Castel | |
| 2019 | Wives of the Landed Gentry | Elizabeth | Short film |
| 2020 | Stalling It | Sammy | Short film |
| 2021 | Watchtower | Lily | Short film |
| 2021 | Nightingale | Lil | Short film |

=== Television ===
| Year | Title | Role | Notes |
|---|---|---|---|
| 2011 | Filthy Cities | Charlotte Corday | Documentary miniseries; uncredited (Episode: "Revolutionary Paris") |
| 2011–2012 | Dark Matters: Twisted But True | Marie; Vicki; Llubmila | Documentary (3 episodes) |
| 2013 | Britain's Secret Homes | Anne; Joan Pendrell | Documentary (2 episodes) |
| 2016 | Class | April MacLean | Main cast (8 episodes) |
| 2018 | Doctors | Ellie Hutton | Episode: "Blink" |
| 2021 | Wolfe | Sarah Goodwin | 1 episode |
| 2022 | Jolly Good Christmas | Charlotte Fitzsimmons | Television film |
| 2023 | The Long Shadow | | |
| 2026 | Silent Witness | Alice Hill | Season 29, episode 1, "The Disappearance of Alice Hill" |

=== Audio ===
| Year | Title | Role | Notes |
|---|---|---|---|
| 2018–2020 | Class | April MacLean | 7 episodes |
| 2020 | Trickster | Georgina Garrett | Virtual live reading |

=== Music videos ===
| Year | Title | Artist | Notes |
|---|---|---|---|
| 2015 | "Whiplash Dreams" | Clearhead | |
