= Katherine Kelly (actress) =

English actress

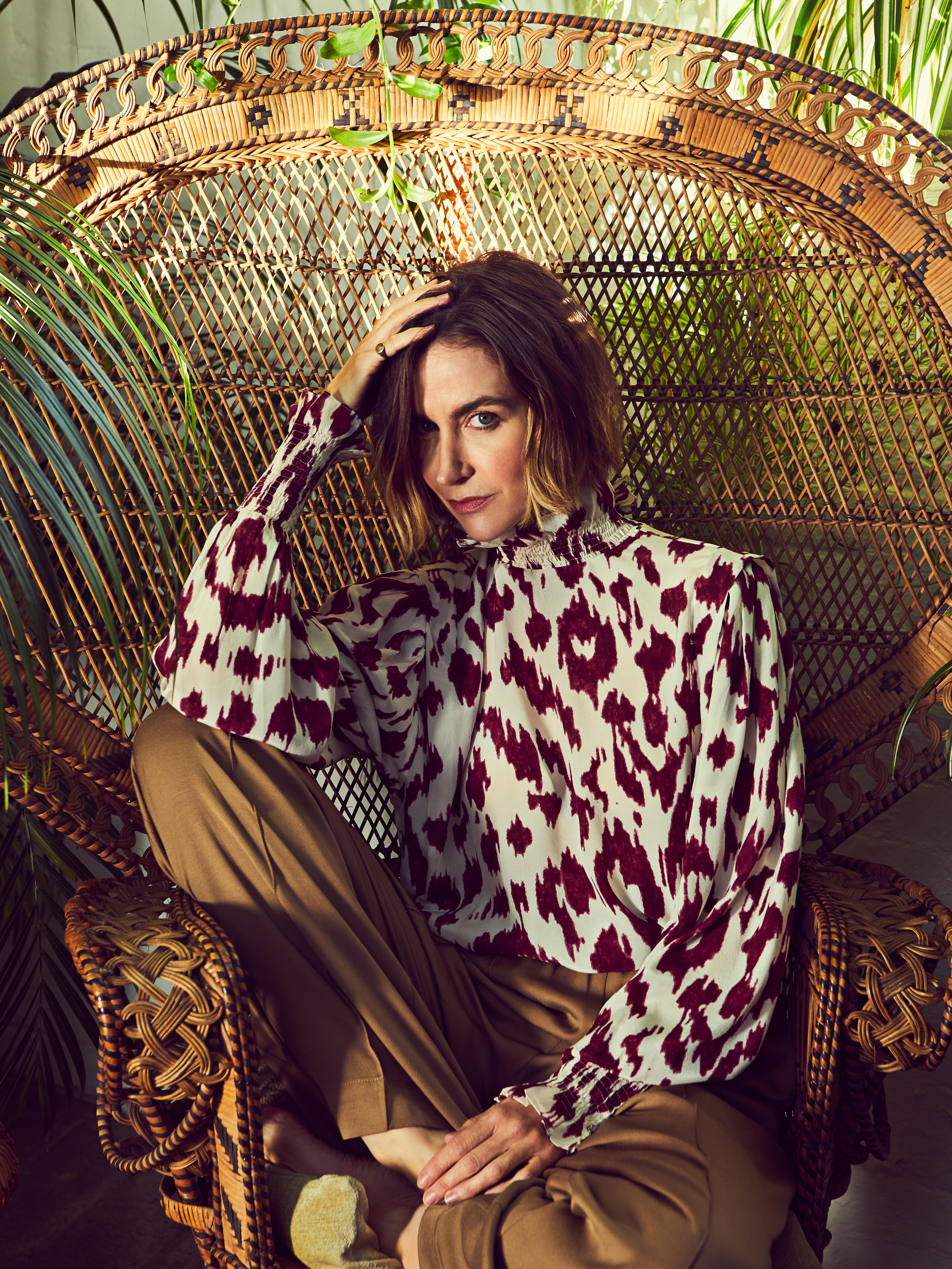
- Kelly in 2019
- Born: Katherine Kelly; 19 November 1979 (age 46); Barnsley, South Yorkshire, England
- Education: Royal Academy of Dramatic Art
- Occupation: Actress
- Years active: 2001–present
- Spouse: Ryan Clark (m. 2013; sep. 2020)
- Partner: Tony Pitts
- Children: 2
- Awards: Full list

Katherine Kelly (born 19 November 1979) is an English actress. She rose to prominence with her portrayal of Becky McDonald on the ITV soap opera Coronation Street (2006–2012), for which she received multiple awards, including the British Soap Award for Best Actress (2009) and the NTA for Best Serial Drama Performance (2012).

Kelly's subsequent television roles include Lady Mae in Mr Selfridge (2013–2014, 2016), DI Jodie Shackleton in Happy Valley (2016), Miss Andrea Quill in Class (2016), Jane Lowry in Strike Back (2017–2018), DCI Natalie Hobbs in Criminal: UK (2019–2020), Elizabeth Sutherland in Gentleman Jack (2019–2022), DI Karen Renton in Liar (2020), Sally Wright in Innocent (2021), Angela van Den Bogerd in Mr Bates vs The Post Office (2024), and Dr. Sophia Craven in The Crow Girl (2025).

== Early life and education ==
Katherine Kelly was born in Barnsley, South Yorkshire. She grew up in both South Yorkshire and the United States. She has strong links with The Lamproom Theatre in Barnsley, established in 1998 by her father John (who is originally from Castleisland, County Kerry, Ireland), and has regularly supported fund-raising events held there.

She trained at the Royal Academy of Dramatic Art with fellow students Meredith MacNeill, Leo Bill, Elliot Cowan, Laurence Fox, and actor and novelist Anna Hope, graduating in 2001.

== Career ==
Kelly was a regular in the ITV soap opera Coronation Street as Becky McDonald from 2006 until 2012.

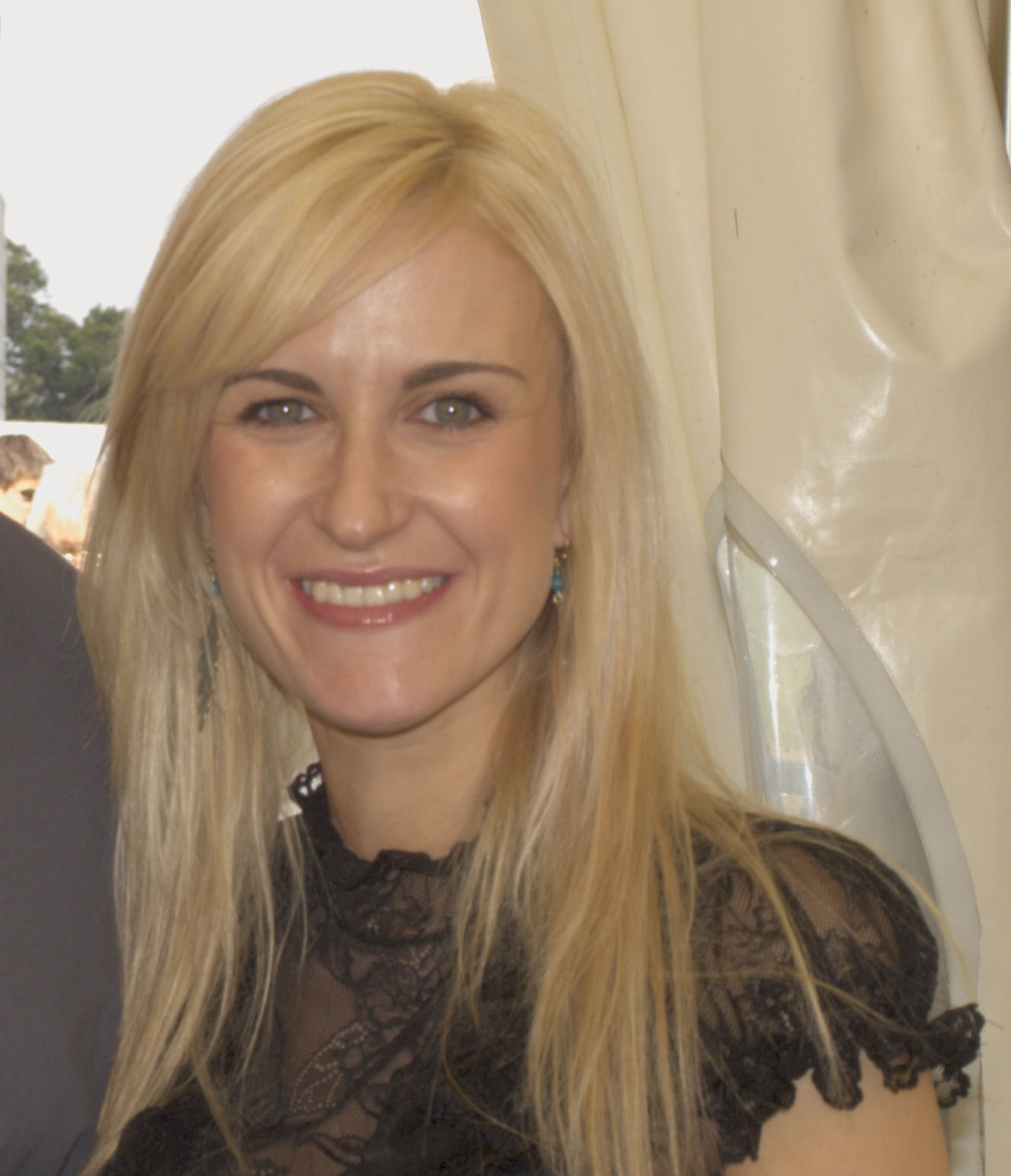
Kelly at the Stoneleigh Park Country Festival in 2008

Kelly appeared on the 2010 album, Coronation Street: Rogues, Angels, Heroes & Fools. Kelly, in character as Becky McDonald, sang the lead single from the album, If It's Too Late, which was remixed by former PWL and Stock Aitken Waterman "Mixmaster", Pete Hammond.

After she left Coronation Street, she was cast as Miss Hardcastle in She Stoops to Conquer at the National Theatre from 24 January 2012.

Kelly's first television role after leaving Coronation Street was in the 90-minute BBC Four biopic The Best Possible Taste, in which she played Lee Middleton, wife of Kenny Everett. In early 2013 she played socialite Lady Loxley in the ITV drama series Mr Selfridge, later signing on to appear in the second series of the show in 2014 and its final series in 2016.

Later in 2013 she joined the lead cast of The Field of Blood, based on the novel by Denise Mina. Kelly played Maloney, an ambitious woman in the "ferociously male-dominated world of 1980s newspaper journalism". Also that year she starred in the three part ITV thriller, The Guilty, as Claire Reid, mother to a missing five-year-old child.

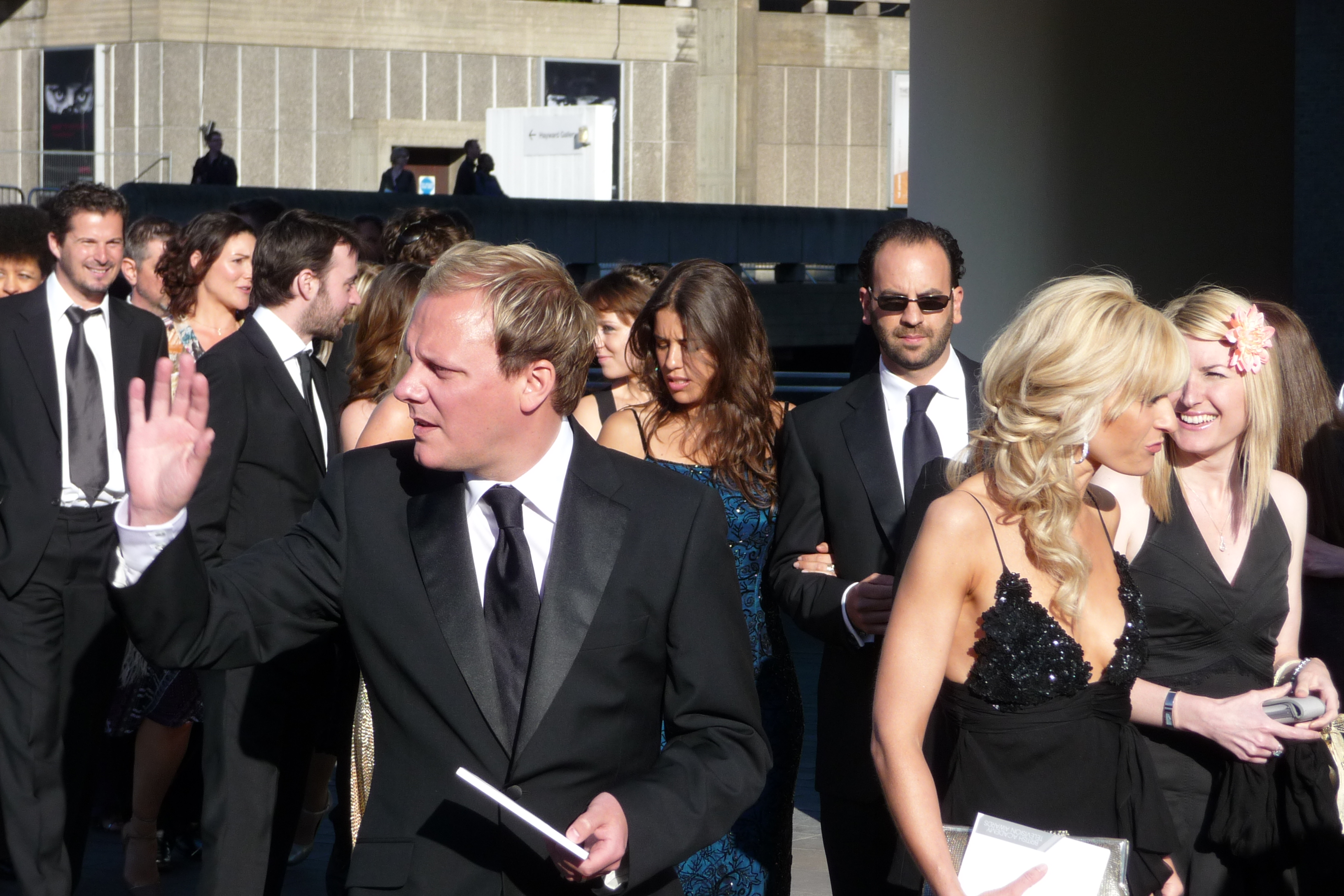
Kelly attending the BAFTAs in 2009, alongside co-star Antony Cotton

In 2014 she played Alaura Kingsley in the critically acclaimed production of City of Angels at the Donmar Warehouse directed by Josie Rourke.

In August 2015 it was announced that Kelly would join the cast of Happy Valley, which aired the following year. In the series Kelly portrays DI Jodie Shackleton, a part that was written for her by series creator Sally Wainwright. Kelly enjoyed the opportunity to play a character in her native Yorkshire accent, and prepared for the role by shadowing police detectives in Halifax. Also in 2016 she appeared as the Permanent Secretary in four episodes of The Night Manager.

On 4 April 2016, it was announced that Kelly would appear in the BBC Three Doctor Who spin-off series Class written by Patrick Ness, airing from October 2016. In October 2016, Kelly appeared as Hannah in ITV drama Him.

In 2018, Kelly made her first film appearance since 2009 in Dirty God, playing Lisa, the protagonist Jade's mother. The following year, Kelly appeared in the feature film Official Secrets, based on the real life events of intelligence whistleblower Katharine Gun (portrayed by Keira Knightley). In the film, Kelly plays Jacqueline Jones, an MI6 agent who tacitly confirms the legitimacy of Gun's leaked memo to a journalist contact at The Observer.

The same year, Kelly appeared in an episode of Flack, as Brooke. Later that year, Kelly portrayed Leah in four part ITV drama Cheat. In September 2019, Netflix released its mini-series Criminal: UK with Kelly in the role of the lead investigator.

Kelly joined the cast of Liar for its second series in 2020, playing Detective Karen Renton. A character bio for Renton describes her as an “unconventional” officer, whose “bluntness” often ruffles feathers. Of her role, Kelly stated “It's my belief that Karen Renton is that way because she has to be that, and if she wasn't that, I wouldn't believe that out of all the detectives that they could send from the Met to solve this front-page news story, why would they pick her if she wasn't excellent at her job?" she said. “I think she would have been chosen because she can act very quickly and very swiftly, and she has great instincts."

In September 2023, Kelly appeared as Emily Jackson in the ITV1 drama series The Long Shadow.

== Personal life ==
Kelly married Ryan Clark in 2013 in Las Vegas. They have two daughters. In August 2020, the couple announced their separation when Kelly relocated from north London to her home town of Barnsley.

In November 2022, Kelly was reported to be dating actor Tony Pitts.

== Filmography ==
=== Television ===
Key
†	Denotes television productions that have not yet been released

Year	Title	Role	Notes
2003	Last of the Summer Wine	Sharlene	Episode: "Ancient Eastern Wisdom — An Introduction"
2003	Silent Witness	Tina Allen	Episode: "Running on Empty (Part One and Part Two)”
2004	The Royal	Tina Binnington	Episode: "Holding on Tight"
2005	Bodies	Sally Campbell	1 episode
2006	No Angels	Annie	1 episode
2006–2012	Coronation Street	Becky McDonald	Guest character (2006); Main cast regular (2006–2012; 704 episodes); British Soap Award for Best Actress (2009); British Soap Award for Best Exit (2012); National Television Award for Best Serial Drama Performance (2012)
2006	Leerdammer	Herself	Advert
2007	Life on Mars	Auntie Heather	1 episode
2007	New Street Law	Rebecca	1 episode
2007	The Visit	Julie	1 episode
2012	The Best Possible Taste	Lee Middleton	Biopic
2013–2014, 2016	Mr Selfridge	Mae, Lady Loxley	30 episodes
2013	The Field of Blood	Maloney	2 episodes
2013	The Last Witch	Alice Lister	Television film
2013	The Guilty	Claire Reid	3 episodes
2015	The Sound of Music Live	Baroness Elsa Schraeder	UK version of The Sound of Music Live!
2016	Happy Valley	DI Jodie Shackleton	Series regular; 6 episodes
2016	The Night Manager	The Permanent Secretary	3 episodes
2016	HIM	Hannah	3 episodes
2016	Class	Miss Andrea Quill	Main role; 8 episodes
2017–2018	Strike Back	Jane Lowry	9 episodes
2018–2019	Murdertown	Presenter	13 episodes
2019	Flack	Brooke Love-Wells	1 episode
2019	Cheat	Leah Dale	Main role; 4 episodes
2019–2022	Gentleman Jack	Elizabeth Sutherland	7 episodes
2019–2020	Criminal: UK	DCI Natalie Hobbs	Main role; 7 episodes
2020	Liar	DI Karen Renton	6 episodes
2021	Innocent	Sally Wright	Main role; 4 episodes
2022	Bloods	George	Main role; 10 episodes
2023	Black Ops	Kirsty	2 episodes
2023	The Long Shadow	Emily Jackson	1 episode
2023	Ruby Speaking	Vicki	Main role; 6 episodes
2024	Mr Bates vs The Post Office	Angela van Den Bogerd	3 episodes
2024	Inside No. 9	Lynne	Episode: "Ctrl Alt Esc"
2024	Protection	DCI Hannah Wheatley	Main role; 6 episodes
2025	The Crow Girl	Sophia Craven	Main role; 6 episodes
2025	In Flight	Jo Conran	Main role; 6 episodes
2025	How Are You? It's Alan (Partridge)	Katrina	Main role
2025	The Hack	Sheridan McCoid	
2026	Number 10 †	Frances Telford	Main role

=== Film ===
Year	Title	Role	Notes
2003	Sons and Lovers	Emily / Suffragette	
2006	Mischief Night	Junkie Jane	
2008	Coronation Street: Out of Africa	Becky Granger	Third Coronation Street direct to video movie
2009	Coronation Street: Romanian Holiday	Becky McDonald	Fourth Coronation Street direct to video movie
2018	Dirty God	Lisa	Minor role
2019	Official Secrets	Jacqueline Jones	
2021	Last Train to Christmas	Paula	

=== Audio ===
Year	Title	Role	Notes
2018	Class	Miss Quill	2 episodes
