= Greg Austin (actor) =

English actor (born 1992)

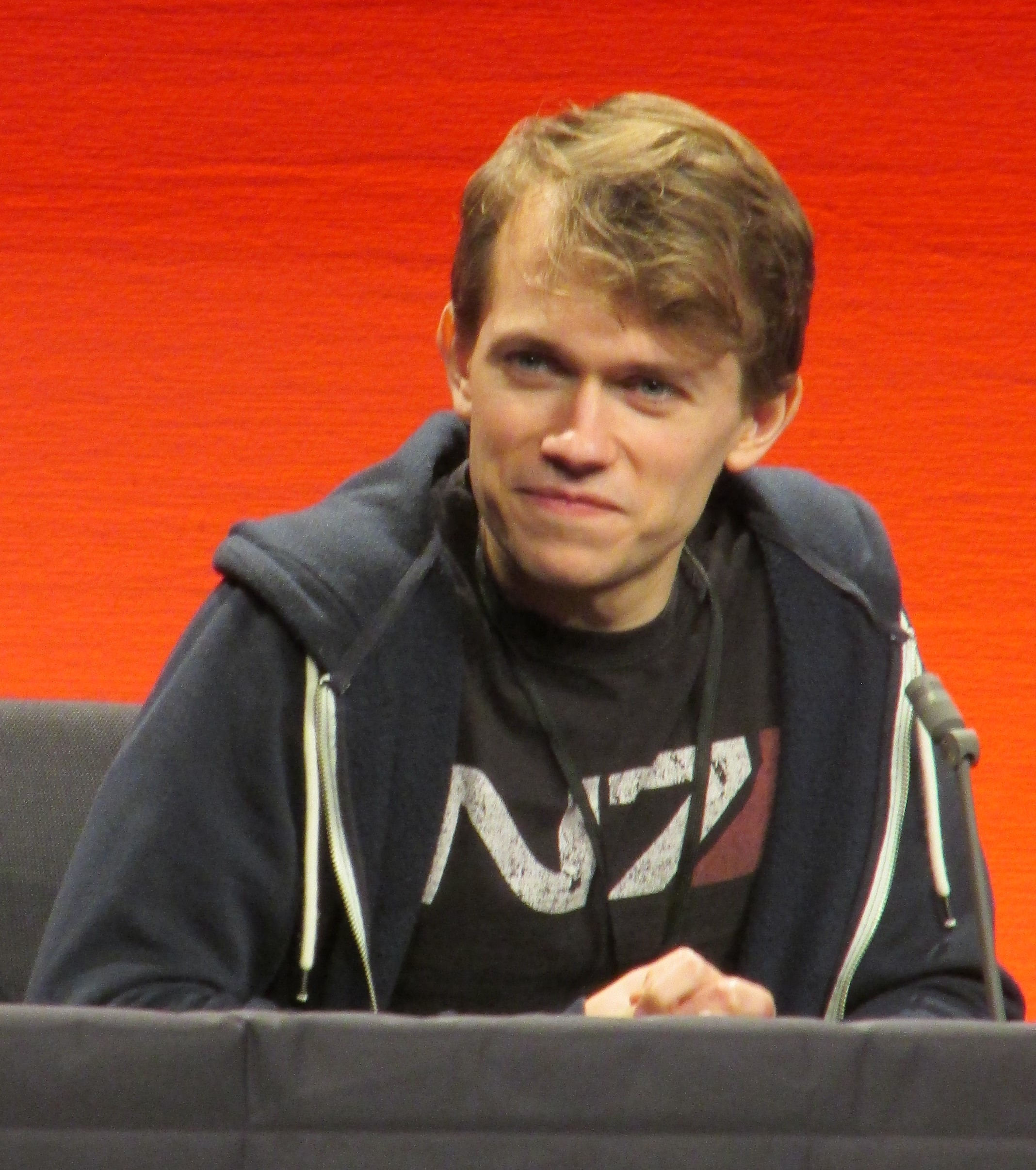
- Born: 2 August 1992 (age 33); Bournemouth, England
- Occupation: Actor
- Years active: 2014–present
- Notable work: Class, Mr Selfridge

Gregory Paul Austin (born 2 August 1992) is an English actor, best known for his roles as Travis Leich in Amazon Prime's Hunters and Charlie Smith in the BBC's Doctor Who spin-off Class.

== Early life ==
Austin grew up in Bournemouth, England, and has three sisters. Before becoming an actor, he started off as a dancer, studying modern, ballet, tap and street dance, which got him into musical theatre. After this, he studied at Arts Educational in London, where he finished his musical theatre degree in 2013.

== Career ==
From 2014 to 2016 Austin starred as the young Gordon Selfridge in ITV's Mr Selfridge, a job he got even before finishing his theatre degree. He also appeared as Rufus Barton in one episode of Law & Order: UK.

In 2015 Austin appeared in the short film Into the Surf.

In 2016 Austin was cast in the BBC Three Doctor Who spin-off Class as Charlie Smith, an alien who falls in love with his classmate Matteusz. At first Austin didn't know his character was alien: when he read the script he presumed that Charlie was a bit socially inept and might have mild Asperger's syndrome, an interpretation that helped him to have a different way of looking at things and to get an alien perspective.

In 2017, he starred in a popular Wrigley's chewing gum commercial and appeared in series 5 of ITV's Endeavour as Rufus Barton.

In 2018 and 2020 Austin reprised his role as Charlie in several audio plays by Big Finish. He then appeared briefly as a "synth" in the Channel 4 series Humans.

In 2019, he had a guest lead role on Stephen Poliakoff's Summer of Rockets, which premiered on BBC2 on 22 May 2019.

In 2020, he played a lead role in Hunters, airing on Amazon Prime, as Travis Leich, a fanatical young Nazi enforcer.

== Filmography ==
=== TV series ===
| Year | Title | Role | Notes |
|---|---|---|---|
| 2014 | Law & Order: UK | Rufus Barton | Guest role (1 episode) |
| 2014–2016 | Mr Selfridge | Gordon Selfridge | Main cast (30 episodes) |
| 2016 | Class | Charlie Smith | Main cast (8 episodes) |
| 2018 | Endeavour | Kit Hutchens/Rufus Barton | Guest Role (2 episodes) |
| 2018 | Humans | Roland | Guest role (1 episode) |
| 2019 | Summer of Rockets | Anthony Shaw | |
| 2020–2023 | Hunters | Travis Leich | Main cast (15 episodes) |
| 2023 | Wreck | Joseph Murphy | Season 2 |

=== Film ===
| Year | Title | Role | Notes |
|---|---|---|---|
| 2016 | Backing Up | | Short film |
| 2015 | Into the Surf | Sebastian | Short film |
| 2019 | After the War | Freddy | |

=== Audio ===
| Year | Title | Role | Notes |
|---|---|---|---|
| 2018–2023 | Class | Charlie Smith | 8 episodes |
