= Manal Issa =

French-Lebanese actress

Manal Issa is a Lebanese-French actress.

Issa was born on March 9, 1992, in Neuilly-sur-Seine to Lebanese Shia parents. When Issa was three she moved with her parents to Beirut. Issa studied engineering.

In 2017 she was shortlisted for nomination for a César Award for Most Promising Actress. In 2022 she acted alongside her sister Nathalie Issa in The Swimmers.

== Filmography ==
Year	Title	Role	Director	Notes
2015	Parisienne	Lina	Danielle Arbid	Original title in French: Peur de rien, lit. 'Afraid of Nothing'
2016	Nocturama	Sabrina	Bertrand Bonello	
2018	My Favourite Fabric	Nahla	Gaya Jiji	
2018	Ulysses & Mona	Mona	Sébastien Betbeder	
2019	Golden Youth	Razerka	Eva Ionesco	
2021	Memory Box	Maia Sanders (young)	Joana Hadjithomas and Khalil Joreige	
2021	The Sea Ahead	Jana	Ely Dagher	
2022	The Swimmers	Sarah Mardini	Sally El-Hosaini	
