= 14-18, the musical =

2014 Flemish musical

14-18
- A Spectacular Musical
- Music: Dirk Brossé
- Lyrics: Allart Blom
- Productions: 2014 Mechelen

14-18, the musical is a Flemish musical about the First World War with the music of Dirk Brossé. The original production by Gert Verhulst and Hans Bourlon opened in April 2014 at the Nekkerhal in Mechelen, directed by Frank Van Laecke and produced by Studio 100. The show closed on November 11, 2014, after being seen by more than 320,000 visitors. In 2024 the musical reopened on the 2nd of June with an updated version in the Studio 100 pop-up theatre in Puurs. This is a theatre that they specially build for their musical about the Second World War 40-45.

The show is about a group of Flemish friends at the outbreak of World War I, as the war drags on longer than anyone expected.

== History ==
=== Development ===
On June 24, 2011, Studio 100 announced that the creative team of Daens was brought together to create a new spectacle about the First World War. On October 30, 2013 Studio 100 announced that there would be English language shows with an alternate cast. On April 15, 2014, it was announced that 117,000 tickets were sold. On June 12, 2014, Studio 100 announced that more than 200,000 tickets were sold.

=== Platform ===
The musical played in the Nekkerhal in Mechelen. In this gigantic hall, it was possible to build a mobile platform so the audience could ride for 150 meters on a set that had a surface area of 2 football fields. The platform weighed 135 tons (excluding the audience), rode over 350 wheels, and was 55 meters long and 22 meters wide.

=== Scenery ===
There were 11 gigantic setpieces (including 6 houses and a large tree) that moved using laser-guided technology. The cast consisted of 9 main actors, 23 ensemble members, 45 extras, 16 children and 6 horse riders.

== Story ==
In 1914, Germany wants to attack France via Belgium. Belgium refuses and becomes involved in World War I. Jan, Kamiel, Albert and Fons are friends who have to fight to defend their country. But all of them want to be somewhere else: Jan wants to go home to his wife, who is pregnant with his son, Kamiel hates violence and does everything to escape it, Albert wants to return to his sweethearts.

== Flemish Cast ==
2014:

- Jan: Jelle Cleymans
- Albert: Bert Verbeke
- Fons: Jonas Van Geel
- Kamiel: Lander Depoortere
- Céline: Maaike Cafmeyer
- Anna: Free Souffriau
- General: Jo de Meyere
- Sergeant Dedecker: Peter Van De Velde
- Deprez: Louis Talpe

2024:

- Jan: Jelle Cleymans, Yanni Bourguignon (alternate)
- Albert: Niels Destadsbader, Bert Verbeke (replacement)
- Fons: Jonas Van Geel, Jérémie Vrielynck (alternate)
- Kamiel: Remi De Smet
- Céline: Charlotte Timmers
- Anna: Sandrine Van Handenhoven
- General: Marc Peeters, Ron Cornet (alternate)
- Sergeant Dedecker: Peter Van De Velde, Nordin De Moor (understudy)

The role of the general was alternated from September 5, 2014 between Jo De Meyere and Mike Verdrengh. On September 17, 2014, Maaike Cafmeyer was replaced by Marie Vinck. On October 1, Bert Verbeke, who took on the role of Albert, was replaced by James Cooke. In the 2024 version was Niels Destadsbader who played the role of Albert replaced on August 28, 2024.

== English cast ==
- Jan: Rob Eyles
- Albert: Bert Verbeke (BE)
- Fons: Danny Whitehead
- Kamiel: Jonathan Broderick
- Celine: Sarah Dungworth
- Anna: Kayleigh McKnight
- General: Dirk Bosschaert (BE)
- Sergeant Dedecker: Luke Hope
- Deprez: Lawrence Sheldon
