= 2012 BFI London Film Festival =

Edition of English film festival

56th BFI London Film Festival Awards
- Festival poster
- Date: 20 October 2012
- Site: Banqueting House, Whitehall
- Hosted by: Sue Perkins

Highlights
- Best Picture: Rust and Bone

The 2012 BFI London Film Festival Awards were held on 20 October 2012 during the BFI London Film Festival, which ran from 10 to 21 October. It was hosted by Sue Perkins at the Banqueting House in London, England. There were four awards presented, along with the BFI Fellowships that went to Tim Burton and Helena Bonham Carter.

== Awards ==
=== Best Film ===
Winner: Rust and Bone, directed by Jacques Audiard.

This is the second win for director Jacques Audiard, his first win was in 2009 for his film A Phophet. With a partnership with American Express, the film was selected for being the most original, intelligent and distinctive filmmaking in the Festival. The award was presented by Sir David Hare, the President of the Official Competition jury.

The nominees:

- After Lucia
- End of Watch
- EVERYDAY
- Fill the Void
- Ginger & Rosa
- In the House
- It Was the Son
- Lore
- Midnight’s Children
- No
- Seven Psychopaths

=== Best British Newcomer ===
Winner: Sally El Hosaini, director and screenwriter of My Brother the Devil.

With a partnership with Swarovski, El Hosaini was selected and recognized for her achievements as a new writer, and director. The award was presented by Olivia Colman and Tom Hiddleston.

The nominees:

- Fady Elsayed for My Brother the Devil (actor)
- Rufus Norris for Broken (director)
- Eloise Laurence for Broken (actor)
- Chloe Pirrie for Shell (actor)
- Scott Graham for Shell (writer and director)
- Tom Shkolnik for The Comedian (writer and director)
- Rowan Athale for Wasteland (writer and director)

=== Sutherland Award ===
Winner: Benh Zeitlin, for Beasts of the Southern Wild.

The long-standing Sutherland Award is presented to Benh Zeitlin for his film Beasts of the Southern Wild for being the most original and imaginative feature debut in the Festival. The award was presented by Helen McCrory and Hannah McGill, president of the jury.

The nominees:

- Clip
- The Comedian
- Eat Sleep Die
- My Brother The Devil
- Neighbouring Sounds
- The Samurai That Night
- Shell
- Ship of Thesues
- Sleeper's Wake
- Tomorrow
- Wadjda

=== The Grierson Award for Best Documentary ===
Winner: Mea Maxima Culpa: Silence in the House of God, written and directed by Alex Gibney.

With a partnership with the Grierson Trust, recognized Alex Gibney's documentary Mea Maxima Culpa: Silence in the House of God, about the Catholic Church and the Vatican's attempts to cover up one of the most appalling scandals of the times, for having the most cultural significance.

The nominees:

- Beware of Mr. Baker
- Canned Dreams
- The Central Park Five
- The Ethnographer
- For No Good Reason
- Free Angela And All Political Prisoners
- Les Invisibles
- The Summit
- Turned Towards the Sun
- Village at the End of the World
- West of Memphis

=== BFI Fellowships ===
Winners: Tim Burton, and Helena Bonham Carter

The Fellowship is the highest accolade that the British Film Institute bestows. Tim Burton, whose film Frankenweenie opened the festival, and Helena Bonham Carter, whose film Great Expectations closed the festival. Sir Christopher Lee presented Burton's award and Sir Trevor Nunn presented Bonham Carter's award.

== See also ==
- List of film awards
