= Metin Akdülger =

Turkish actor

- Born: 10 April 1988 (age 38); Bursa, Turkey
- Education: Koç University
- Occupation: Actor
- Years active: 2012–present

Metin Akdülger (born 10 April 1988) is a Turkish actor, writer, musician. He is the co-writer of comic book series Görmüş Geçirmiş Kaptan 88. His music band is "Journers".

Akdülger, who took part in amateur plays and made short films during his youth, attended acting classes at his school due to his interest in acting while continuing his education at Koç University. He continued to take part in amateur theatre plays at the university. He joined the Craft Theatre team in 2012. His professional theatre career began in 2012 with his role in the play Tape. In 2013, he entered television, and began starring in the popular TV series Medcezir. In the same year, he made his cinematic debut with the movie Bensiz, in which he portrayed a footballer who suffers a stroke. After this experience, Akdülger returned to theatre by joining the cast of Mary, which went on stage in 2014 at Didaskali Theatre. In 2015, he starred in the period series Analar ve Anneler.

In 2016, he took part in the play Kahramanlar Hep Erkek, an adaptation of Duygu Asena's autobiography Kadının Adı Yok. In the same year, he landed his first leading role in a TV series by portraying Murad IV in the second season of the historical show Muhteşem Yüzyıl: Kösem. After this series, Akdülger had a solo performance with the play Baldan Karanlık in 2017, which was well received by the critics. With his performance in the play, he received the "Promising Actor of the Year" at the 2nd Üstün Akmen Theatre Awards. In the same year, he appeared in the movie Kırık Kalpler Bankası. Akdülger had a leading role in My Favourite Fabric, which premiered at the 2018 Cannes Film Festival. He then continued his career with roles in the crime fiction series Şahsiyet in 2018 and the fantasy series Atiye in 2019. In addition to feature films, Akdülger has played in many short films throughout his career and has been a judge in many short film competitions. In late 2019, he formed the band Journers with Burak Yeşildurak and started making music.

== Early life and education ==
Metin Akdülger was born on 10 April 1988 in Bursa. His family were Turkish immigrants from Thessaloniki and Skopje, and he spent his childhood on a farmhouse. He realized that he had an interest in acting while taking part in small plays in high school and shooting short films with his friends. But instead of enrolling in conservatory, he decided to study international relations and political science "to learn what is happening in the world". He moved from Bursa to Istanbul to study international relations at Koç University. When he was in the third year of his studies, he learned that Yıldız Kenter was teaching at his school and started to attend her classes. He was Kenter's assistant for a while.

The first play he took part in at the university was an adaptation of Romeo and Juliet. He wanted the role of Tybalt in the play, but ended up portraying Romeo. After taking Kenter's classes, he decided to try method acting, and in 2012 he took acting lessons from Merve Taşkan. In the same year he started working with Craft Theatre. His first professional theatre debut came in 2012, with a role in an adaptation of Stephen Belber's Tape, which was directed by Tevfik Şahin. He portrayed the character of Vince on stage.

== Career ==
=== 2013–2015: Medcezir and Bensiz ===
Metin Akdülger went to New York City to take further acting training after his first theatre experiences. When he was there, he stopped taking lessons because he thought that the techniques he would learn abroad could not be adapted to Turkish culture and industry upon his return to Istanbul. While in New York, he began preparations for a potential role in the Turkish adaptation of The O.C. titled Medcezir. He auditioned for the role when he returned to Turkey. In the same period, an offer was made for him to portray Şehzade Selim in the fourth season of Muhteşem Yüzyıl, for which he auditioned as well. At the end of the process, Akdülger began to portray the character of Orkun Civanoğlu in Medcezir. The series was directed by Ali Bilgin and premiered on 13 September 2013 on Star TV. It concluded after two seasons on 12 June 2015. After the series, Akdülger commented that "he did not comply with the role of villain, but he successfully overcame the [hardships of playing the] role". Radikal defended the character's motive and behavior in the series, mentioning that he "justifying reasons to be bad" and "the reason for the hatred in his eyes could be understood".

Akdülger, who had previously met and worked with Ahmet Küçükkayalı, received an offer from him in 2013 to portray the character of Necip in a movie that was set to be written and directed by Küçükkayalı himself and Akdülger subsequently accepted the offer. The movie, called Bensiz, was released on 2 May 2014 as a mutual work by Turkey, Germany and France, in which he portrayed a football player in the amateur league called Necip, who becomes paralyzed following an illness. Akdülger started preparing for the role a year before the movie was released. He played football in the amateur league, joining the team Başıbüyük Spor in Maltepe for about three months, and together with his acting coach Merve Taşkan met paralyzed people in hospitals. He lost 17 kg in 40 days for the role. Akdülger believed that process wore him out but nourished him along the way. Akdülger's performance in the movie was praised by Hürriyet columnist Uğur Vardan. After making his television and cinematic debut, Akdülger portrayed Ganin in an adaptation of Mary, which was produced by Didaskali Theatre for the 19th Istanbul Theatre Festival in 2014 at the request of the Istanbul Foundation for Culture and Arts. Evaluating the play, Yaşam Kaya wrote that Akdülger is "successful and in the foreground".

After Medcezir, it was reported that Akdülger would appear in a period drama written by Berkun Oya and directed by Mehmet Ada Öztekin. He later accepted the offer after reading the script and began meeting with the crew. Analar ve Anneler tells the stories of two young mothers leading different lives in 1970s and premiered on ATV on 22 October 2015. In this series, Akdülger played the role of Tahsin, the university friend of Sinem Kobal's character Zerrin. He later stated that he was "experiencing different things day by day through [playing] Tahsin," adding that playing a character from 1970s had deepened his relationship with his family, especially his father. The series concluded with 9 episodes.

=== 2016–2018: Muhteşem Yüzyıl: Kösem and Baldan Karanlık ===
In 2016, Metin Akdülger took part in the theatre play which was prepared for Duygu Asena's 70th birthday and adapted from the author's autobiographical novel, Kadının Adı Yok'. Produced by Akbank Sanat and directed by Kemal Hamamcıoğlu, Kahramanlar Hep Erkek went on stage in April 2016.

In 2016, Akdülger refused the offer to play in the TV series No 309 on Fox. He later made an agreement with a producer for a new series which was set to be broadcast on the same channel. However, after receiving an offer to play Murad IV in Muhteşem Yüzyıl: Kösem he was reported to have terminated his contract. Akdülger shared the leading role with Nurgül Yeşilçay and Farah Zeynep Abdullah in the second season of this historical TV show which premiered on Fox on 18 November 2016 and ended on 27 June 2017. The season focused on the power struggles between Murad IV and his mother Kösem Sultan. Akdülger has described Muhteşem Yüzyıl: Kösem as a turning point in his career. Sema Karabıyık from Yeni Şafak from Akdülger's portrayal of Muard IV not exceptional, a viewpoint supported by Sabah columnist Mevlüt Tezel who believed casting him in this role was "a big mistake". Besides appearing on television, Akdülger was a cast member on Onur Ünlü's Kırık Kalpler Bankası which was released on 13 April 2017 during the 36th International Istanbul Film Festival. In this movie, which was a modern comedy adaptation of Shakespeare's Romeo and Juliet, Akdülger portrayed a footballer name Turan.

In the fall of 2017, Akdülger started working for the one-man show Baldan Karanlık, written and directed by Hamamcıoğlu. The play, which was about the story of an abandoned dog, went on stage for the first time on 9 December 2017. Akdülger later stated that this show had brought him to life after working for a long time on television; adding that he had found the story very motivational and said, "there's no need to do some dramaturgical crazy work because the play is on fire itself. As a result, your field of exploration as an actor increases. It has a very sincere language for me. This is reflected in my performance." Akdülger's physical performance was admired by Akşam, and Ranini.tv praised him for his simple and powerful performance. Vatan also wrote that the audience were impressed by "the magnificent performance" of the actor. For his performance in Baldan Karanlık, Akdülger shared the "Promising Actor of the Year" award with Efe Erkekli and Ozan Dolunay at the 2nd Üstün Akmen Theatre Awards.

In February 2018, it was announced that Akdülger would join the cast of Puhutv's miniseries Şahsiyet. The series was directed by Onur Saylak and written by Hakan Günday, in which Akdülger plays the role of a journalist and DJ named Ateş Arbay who helps Cansu Dere's character Nevra in solving the murders committed by an old retired court clerk. The series premiered on 17 March 2018 and concluded with 12 episodes. In 2018, Akdülger appeared in a main role in Gaya Jiji's My Favourite Fabric, in which he played an imaginary man that appears to a young woman who is about to get married amidst the Syrian civil war but wants to pursue her dreams. The movie was screened in the Un Certain Regard section at the 2018 Cannes Film Festival.

=== 2019–present: My Favourite Fabric and The Gift ===
In March 2019, it was reported that Akdülger had joined the cast of Netflix's new fantasy drama series The Gift and its principal photography was underway. The series is centered around Atiye portrayed by Beren Saat, an artist who comes across universal secrets in Göbekli Tepe, Anatolia. Akdülger played the role of Atiye's boyfriend Ozan, the son of a wealthy businessman. Anibal Güleroğlu from Milliyet found Ozan as one of the "most believable" characters in the series. Its first season premiered on 27 December 2019. Its second season was released in September 2020, followed by a third and final season in June 2021.

Akdülger appeared in a feature film, titled One-Way to Tomorrow, by Ozan Açıktan in 2020 opposite Dilan Çiçek Deniz which tells the story of two people traveling from Ankara to İzmir to attend the same wedding. It was released on 19 June 2020.

== Personal life and other activities ==
Akdülger says that since he was the youngest child of his family, he had a lonely childhood. He liked painting when he was young, and during his high school years, he played bass guitar and had formed a rock band with his friends. He played American football at university. In May 2020, he said that he had been practicing veganism for 6–7 months. He says that he has not had a TV at home since his university years. Akdülger who is interested in writing besides acting, stated in a 2018 interview that he had prepared three short plays and two long ones, yet he believed he take them to stage in the future as a producer, rather than an actor or director. In May 2020, during an interview for XOXO The Mag, Akdülger said that he had been working on a script with a friend from Bursa for the past 3 years. Akdülger has had roles in many short films besides feature films. He has appeared in many videos on Hamamcıoğlu's YouTube channel.

Together with his high school friend, Burak Yeşildurak, he founded the music band Journers and together they released a single titled "Döngüm" in December 2019. Akdülger said that forming a band called Journers was on Yeşildurak's mind for a long time, and the band was founded when they made the song "Döngüm" to support each other during a difficult period in their lives. Since they needed a more professional person with a knowledge of music to help with live performances, their high school friend Mehmet Can Erdek joined the band and Akdülger said that new people might join them in the future. The band released the song "Bırak Aksın" on 9 March 2020, for which an animated music video was released on 14 May. On 30 April 2020, he released the songs "Aşk Canavarı" and "İstiyorum Elbet" with the same band. Akdülger says that he does not self-identify as a musician but he "enjoys" making music. He contributes to the songs as a vocalist, songwriter and bassline composer.

Akdülger was a judge in the Univision section of the 2018 KısaKes Film Festival. In 2019, he curated the selection of short movies from Turkey at the 18th !f Istanbul International Independent Film Festival. In the same year, he was a judge in the national fiction category at the 20th International İzmir Short Film Festival. He also served as a judge at the 1st Umursuyorum (I Care About) Short Animated Film competition organized by Bahçeşehir University and Turkey Spinal Cord Injury Association, with whom he had worked while preparing for his role in Bensiz. In 2020, he voiced the digital version of Abdussamed Delen's novel Ahşap Kulübe, which was published by the association.

== Filmography ==
=== Television ===
TV series
Year	Title	Role	Notes
2013–2015	Medcezir	Orkun	
2015	Analar ve Anneler	Tahsin	
2016–2017	Muhteşem Yüzyıl: Kösem	Murad IV	Main role (season 2)
2018	Şahsiyet	Ateş Arbay	puhutv
2019	Tek Yürek	Desyus	
2019–2021	Atiye	Ozan	Netflix
2021–2022	Kulüp	Orhan Şahin	Netflix
2022	Between the World and Us	Kenan	Web series
2023–2024	Sandık Kokusu	Atilla	Disney+
2024	Thank You, Next	Ömer	Netflix

=== Film ===
Movies
Year	Title	Role	Notes	Ref.
2013	The Mask	Police	Short film	
2014	Bensiz	Necip		
2015	Farewellcome	Young man	Short film	
2016	Yok, Sağ Ol		Short film	
2016	Tereddüt		Guest appearance	
2017	Kırık Kalpler Bankası	Turan	It was shown at festivals and events, but was not publicly released.	
2019	My Favourite Fabric	Dreaming man		
2019	The Ruse	Benjamin	Short film, Akdülger is also one of the producers.	
2020	One-Way to Tomorrow	Ali	Netflix's first original Turkish movie	
2020	İnsanlar İkiye Ayrılır	Barış	Guest appearance	
2025	Two Worlds One Wish	Can		

=== Music videos ===
Music videos
Year	Title	Role	Notes	Ref.
2016	"Yine Buluşuruz"		Korhan Futacı, Kara Orkestra and Yasemin Mori's music video.	
2019	"Bekliyodum Bayadır"	Cameo	F.A.'s music video	

== Theatre ==
Plays
Year	Title	Role
2012	Tape	Vince
2014	Mary	Ganin
2016	Kahramanlar Hep Erkek	Himself
2017	Baldan Karanlık	Dog

== Awards ==
Award	Ceremony	Category	Work	Result
2nd Üstün Akmen Theatre Awards	2 May 2018	Promising Actor of the Year	Baldan Karanlık	Won
