= Mega Mindy =

Belgian children's television series

- Created by: Sven Duyn
- Starring: Free Souffriau; Louis Talpe; Anton Cogen; Matthias Temmermans; Fred Van Kuyk; Nicky Langley
- Opening theme: "Ik Ben Mega Mindy", performed by Free Souffriau
- Country of origin: Belgium
- Original language: Dutch
- No. of seasons: 6
- No. of episodes: 70

Production
- Executive producers: Bart Van Leemputten; Matthias Temmermans; Gert Verhulst
- Camera setup: Videotape (filmized); Multi-camera
- Running time: 22–23 minutes
- Production company: Studio 100

Original release
- Network: Ketnet
- Release: 26 November 2006 – 29 October 2014

Mega Mindy is a Flemish children's television series with a supernatural/superhero drama theme. The series was created by Studio 100 and airs on the Flemish TV channel Ketnet. It centers around a young woman, Mieke (Free Souffriau), who lives with her grandparents and works as a police officer but also has a secret identity as superhero Mega Mindy. She tries to keep it a secret, but falls in love with Toby (Louis Talpe) who also works at the police. He is in love with Mega Mindy and does not know that Mieke secretly likes him and is actually Mega Mindy. She tries to find a way to balance between work and being a superhero, but it is not always easy.

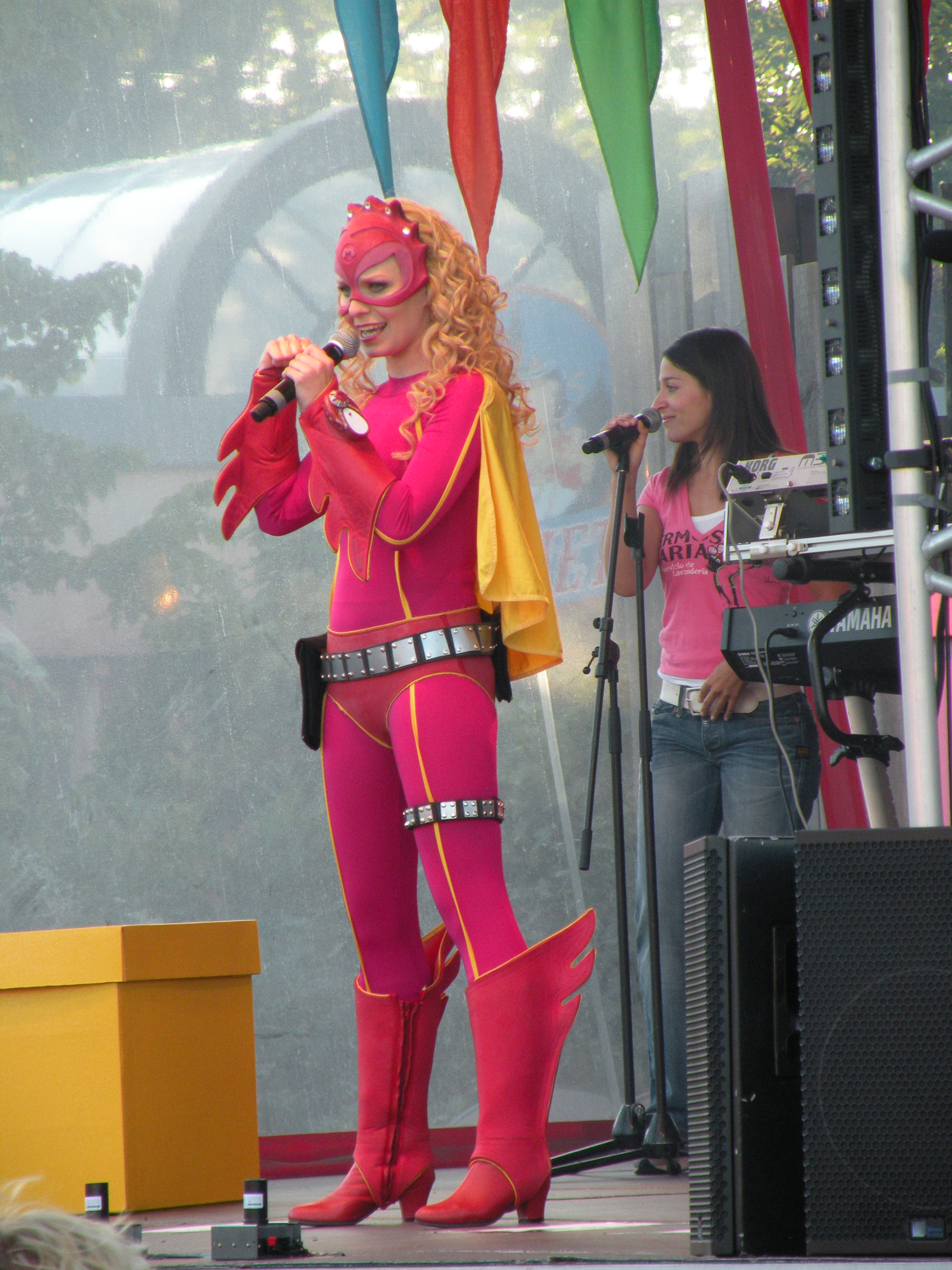
Mega Mindy performing in Plopsaland, De Panne, Belgium

Every episode has a new mystery that Mieke has to solve and one or more bad guys whom Mega Mindy takes down. Mieke's not-so-smart boss always tries to solve the case, but Mega Mindy usually ends up with the solution, which he does not appreciate. He does manage to claim responsibility for capturing a bad guy on several occasions because Mega Mindy cannot reveal herself.

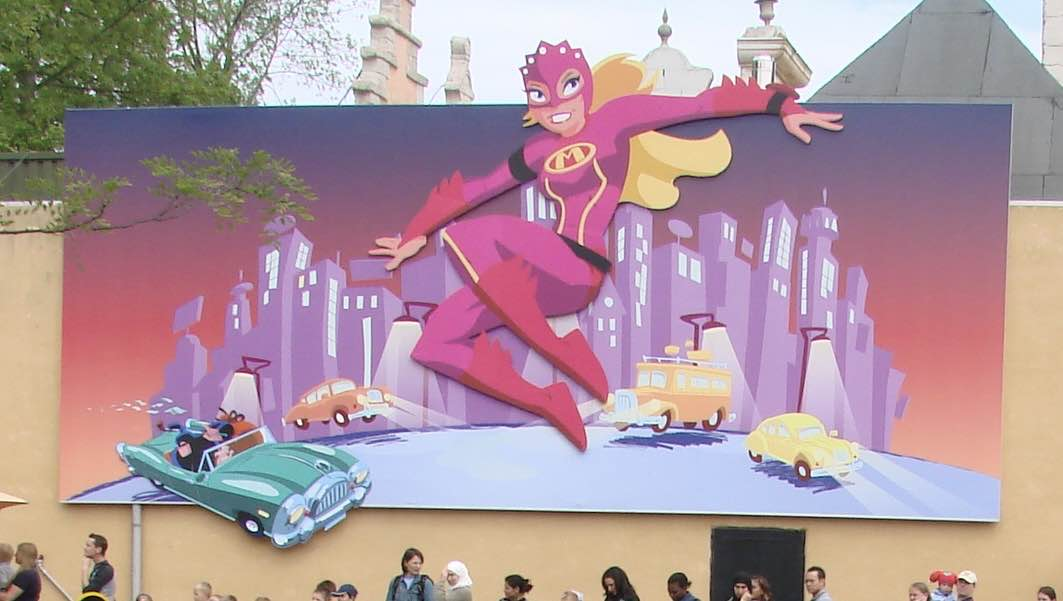
Cartoon version of the character

== Cast ==
=== Main characters ===
- Free Souffriau as Mieke Fonkel/Mega Mindy (2006–2021)
- Lotte Stevens as Mieke Fonkel/Mega Mindy (2021-2024)
- Louis Talpe as Toby (2006–present)
- Anton Cogen as Commissaris Kamiel Migrain (2007–present)
- Sjarel Branckaerts as Commissaris Emiel Migrain (2006–2007)
- Fred Van Kuyk as Grandpa Fonkel (2006–present)
- Nicky Langley as Grandma Fonkel (2006–present)
- Matthias Temmermans as Beep (2006–present)

=== Side characters ===
- Megan W. as main side chick (S1 E8)
- Lyanne R. as Side chick (S2 E13)
- Ilse J. as Side chick (S2 E18)
- Anneke P. as Side chick (S4 E2)

== Powers ==
Mega Mindy has several superhero powers. She is able to run fast, to fly and teleport to any place she wants.

== Adaptations ==
Mega Mindy was adapted into several stage shows and four films, released in respectively 2009, 2010, 2011 and 2015.

A theatre show ran in 2021 with actrice Lotte Stevens, after Free Souffriau announced that she was quitting the role she had played for 15 years.

== Trivia ==
Through the years, various Mega Mindy costumes, games, toys and children books were released by Studio 100.

Souffriau herself sings the opening theme. She also provided the voice for different Mega Mindy singles, albums and story readings that were released.

The original boss of Mieke and Toby in the series was replaced by his younger brother. In reality the actor who played their boss, Sjarel Branckaerts, died.
