= The Swimmers (2022 film) =

Film directed by Sally El Hosaini

- Official release poster
- Directed by: Sally El-Hosaini
- Screenplay by: Sally El-Hosaini; Jack Thorne
- Produced by: Eric Fellner; Tim Bevan; Ali Jaafar; Tim Cole
- Starring: Nathalie Issa; Manal Issa; Ahmed Malek; Matthias Schweighöfer; Ali Suliman; Kinda Alloush; James Krishna Floyd
- Cinematography: Christopher Ross
- Edited by: Iain Kitching
- Music by: Steven Price
- Production company: Working Title Films
- Distributed by: Netflix
- Release dates: September 8, 2022 (TIFF); November 11, 2022 (United Kingdom/United States); November 23, 2022 (Netflix)
- Running time: 134 minutes
- Countries: United Kingdom; United States
- Languages: Arabic; English

The Swimmers is a 2022 biographical sports drama film directed by Sally El Hosaini, who co-wrote the screenplay with Jack Thorne. The film stars real-life sisters Nathalie Issa and Manal Issa, Ahmed Malek, Matthias Schweighöfer, Ali Suliman, Kinda Alloush, James Krishna Floyd, and Elmi Rashid Elmi. The film follows two young sisters who embark on a risky voyage from war-torn Syria to Rio de Janeiro, Brazil, as one of them competes in the 2016 Summer Olympics.

The Swimmers premiered at the 2022 Toronto International Film Festival on September 8, 2022, and was released in select cinemas on November 11 before its streaming release on November 23, by Netflix. The film was nominated at the 2023 BAFTA film awards for Outstanding British Film, received positive reviews from critics and was a global hit on Netflix, achieving no.1 in 15 countries and top 10 in 85 countries.

== Premise ==
The plot follows the life story of teenage Syrian refugees Yusra Mardini and her sister Sarah Mardini, who swam alongside a sinking dinghy of refugees to lighten it, and eventually help 18 refugees reach safety across the Aegean Sea while being smuggled from İzmir towards Lesbos. Subsequent struggles as refugees are vividly depicted, but Yusra Mardini's swimming career sees her reach the Rio 2016 Olympics as a member of the Refugee Olympic Team.

The final credits inform that Yusra's sister Sarah, who had returned to Lesbos as part of voluntary efforts to assist incoming refugees in 2016, had been arrested and faced charges that carried potentially long-term prison sentences, if convicted.

== Cast ==
- Nathalie Issa as Yusra Mardini
- Manal Issa as Sarah Mardini
- Ahmed Malek as Nizar
- Matthias Schweighöfer as Sven
- James Krishna Floyd as Emad
- Ali Suliman as Ezzat Mardini
- Kinda Alloush as Mervat Mardini
- Elmi Rashid Elmi as Bilal
- Nahel Tzegai as Shada

== Production ==
In April 2021, it was announced that Manal Issa and Nathalie Issa had been cast to play real-life sisters Yusra and Sara Mardini in The Swimmers for Working Title Films and Netflix.

Principal photography was suspended five days before the start, due to the COVID-19 pandemic in 2020. Production began in April 2021, and the film was shot in the United Kingdom, Belgium, and Turkey. Filming locations in Turkey include Istanbul and Çeşme.

Manal and Nathalie Issa both learned to swim for their roles.

Manal Issa, who is of Lebanese descent, later criticized the film for orientalism, apoliticism, and failing to cast Syrian actors. She further reported trauma experienced by the cast from filming in the Aegean Sea near refugees trying to cross, as well as low wages for Turkish and Syrian extras.

El Hosaini has stated that they had a duty of care to the cast (in particular those Syrian refugees involved in front of and behind the camera) and that production were able to deliver on that to avoid any traumatizing effects. She has also stated her belief that it was important that refugees were involved because of "the idea of authenticity and letting people be part of the telling of their own story."

In the context of the contemporary refugee crisis, El Hosaini did not just want to present the story of the Mardini sisters and the other refugees. Rather, her intention was to show in a realistic style, what refugees are going through in real life. In an interview about the film, Yusra Mardini said, "After the Olympics, I realised that it's not just my story anymore. I realised that my responsibility is to raise awareness and bring hope to millions of refugees around the world and speak for all of those who do not have a voice."

In another interview, Yusra explains "We wanted it to be as authentic as possible… We knew that there would be elements of fiction but we really wanted our authentic story to be out there. In the end they are talking about us. It is our life story. When we watched it, it was just very, very good. Even if the situation did not happen exactly the way it is depicted, it did happen, or it did happen to other refugees and that was the main point."

== Release ==
The Swimmers had its world premiere as the opening film at the 2022 Toronto International Film Festival on September 8, 2022, and was released in select cinemas on November 11, 2022, before its streaming release on November 23, 2022, by Netflix. In its first week on Netflix it was a global hit, achieving no.1 in 15 countries and top 10 in 85 countries. In its second week from November 28, 2022, it increased its viewership even more and climbed to no.2 globally on the platform.

== Reception ==
On review aggregator Rotten Tomatoes, the film has a score of 82% based on 62 reviews. The website's critics consensus reads, "The Swimmers can be heavy-handed and it's arguably too long, but it handles a worthy topic with generally uplifting results." On Metacritic, the film holds a score of 62 out of 100, based on 15 critics, indicating "generally favorable reviews".

The film has been praised for "attempts to challenge reductivist Western framings of refugee's identities" and how it "placed importance on Arab culture."

=== Accolades ===
Award	Date of ceremony	Category	Recipient(s)	Result	Ref.
British Academy Film Awards	February 19, 2023	Outstanding British Film	The Swimmers	Nominated	
Cinema for Peace Awards	February 24, 2023	Cinema for Peace Dove for The Most Valuable Film of the Year 2023	The Swimmers	Nominated	
