= Of Kings and Prophets =

2016 American television drama

- Genre: Biblical drama
- Based on: Bible, Books of Samuel
- Developed by: Adam Cooper; Bill Collage
- Starring: Ray Winstone; Olly Rix; Simone Kessell; James Floyd; Haaz Sleiman; Maisie Richardson-Sellers; Jeanine Mason; Mohammad Bakri; David Walmsley; Louis Talpe; Nathaniel Parker; Lyne Renée; Élodie Yung
- Composers: Trevor Morris; Mark Kilian
- Country of origin: United States
- Original language: English
- No. of seasons: 1
- No. of episodes: 2 (+7 unaired)

Production
- Executive producers: Michael Offer; Reza Aslan; Mahyad Tousi; Jason T. Reed; Adam Cooper; Bill Collage; Chris Brancato
- Producers: Tina Grewal; Vlokkie Gordon; Paul Eckstein
- Production location: Cape Town, South Africa
- Cinematography: George Steel; Sidney Sidell; Michael Snyman; Trevor Michael Brown
- Editors: Adam Bluming; Tim Mirkovich
- Running time: 42 minutes
- Production companies: ABC Studios; BoomGen Studios; Philotimo Factory; Jason T. Reed Productions

Original release
- Network: ABC
- Release: March 8 – March 15, 2016

Of Kings and Prophets is an American television drama based on the Biblical Books of Samuel that premiered on ABC in 2016. The series follows an ensemble of characters including Saul and David, the successive kings of Israel, their families, and their political rivals. Of Kings and Prophets was filmed in Cape Town, South Africa.

The series was originally scheduled to premiere in late 2015. However, due to creative changes; it was moved to mid-season in the 2015-16 television season, and premiered on March 8, 2016. Due to low ratings; ABC canceled the series after airing two episodes. As of 2026, all nine episodes were variously available for stream, rent, or purchase on Apple TV, Fandango, Google Play, Prime Video, and YouTube.

== Cast ==
=== Main characters ===
- Ray Winstone as Saul, the king of Israel.
- Olly Rix as David, a shepherd and the future king of Israel.
- Simone Kessell as Ahinoam, the queen of Israel and Saul's wife.
- James Floyd as Ishbaal, the younger son of Saul and Ahinoam.
- Haaz Sleiman as Jonathan, the elder son of Saul and Ahinoam.
- Maisie Richardson-Sellers as Michal, the younger daughter of Saul and a Kushite concubine.
- Jeanine Mason as Merav, the elder daughter of Saul and Ahinoam.
- Mohammad Bakri as Samuel, the prophet of Israel.
- David Walmsley as Yoab, the nephew of David.
- Nathaniel Parker as Achish, the king of Philistine.

=== Recurring characters ===
- Louis Talpe as Eliab, the eldest brother of David and soldier in Saul's army.
- Christina Chong as Rizpah, the concubine of Saul.
- Rowena King as Zaphra
- Lyne Renee as Witch of Endor
- Alex McGregor as Sarah

== Production ==
Writers Adam Cooper and Bill Collage said at the Television Critics Association press tour that they hope to push the envelope "as far as we can" in regards to the amount of sex and violence featured on the series. Showrunner Chris Brancato later clarified "This story is an Old Testament [one that's] violent [and] sex-drenched. It's one of the world's first soap operas. ... You will watch a show that is tasteful but that also tells the story you can read if you want to pick up the Bible." Then-ABC president Paul Lee (who was removed from the network before the show premiered) described the pilot episode simply as "muscular".

Cooper suggested that if need be, some of the more graphic scenes on the series may be edited for public broadcast, and release the originally intended scenes for online viewing. This did indeed occur with the first episode, which was released online with additional sexual content and nudity that was not seen in the ABC broadcast.

== Reception ==
=== Critical response ===
The show has received below average reviews from critics, with some critics negatively comparing it to Game of Thrones. On Metacritic, the first season of Of Kings and Prophets received a score of 47/100 based on 16 media reviews, indicating "mixed or average reviews". On Rotten Tomatoes, it holds a 29% approval rating based on 17 media reviews with its critical consensus: "Of Kings and Prophets tries to add a Game of Thrones-inspired spin to the Old Testament, but ends up an aimless muddle." In the show's favor, Variety wrote, "Its courtly sets, tents, and marketplaces often have a pleasingly realistic level of detail, and some glimpses of the outdoor scenery of South Africa (which stands in for ancient Israel) are breathtaking." IGN noted, "It does have a few things going for it, including high production values and intriguing political and religious themes. Winstone (as Saul) brings a very human quality to the character that is usually left out of other depictions."

=== Parental group reaction ===
The Parents Television Council criticized the series for scenes of sex and violence and called for it to be removed from the network's schedule. The PTC has compared the show's content to a "broadcast" version of Game of Thrones.

=== Ratings ===
The first episode opened up to 3.32 million viewers. The second episode had lower ratings, having live viewing of 2.42 million viewers, assuring the show's cancellation. Beyond the Tank, which had aired several episodes in the fall and early winter in the same timeslot, returned for the remainder of the season.

== Episodes ==
No.	Title	Directed by	Written by	Original release date	US viewers (millions)
1	"Offerings of Blood"	Michael Offer	Adam Cooper & Bill Collage	March 8, 2016	3.33
In order to defend his kingdom, King Saul of the Israelites arranges a strategic marriage for his daughter Merav to the Eitan of Judah's son Mattiyahu in hopes it will unify the 12 Israelite tribes against their enemies, the Philistines. In the midst of the wedding preparations, Prophet Samuel brings the king a message from God, to destroy the Amalekites. Meanwhile, after his flock of sheep was killed by a lion, the shepherd David travels to the king's palace in Gibeah to settle his family's debt. But when he cannot afford his taxes, he must pay the penalty with a flogging. To settle the matter, he makes a deal with Ahinoam, the queen to either kill the beast or perish.
2	"Let the Wicked Be Ashamed"	Duane Clark	Theresa Rebeck	March 15, 2016	2.42
3	"Lest I Sleep the Sleep of Death"	Michael Robison	Adam Cooper	Unaired	N/A
4	"Beasts of the Reeds"	David Boyd	Dan Dworkin & Jay Beattie	Unaired	N/A
5	"Little Lower than the Angels"	Jean de Segonzac	Janet Lin	Unaired	N/A
6	"Honor in the Dust"	Romeo Tirone	Theresa Rebeck	Unaired	N/A
7	"Train My Hands for War"	Duane Clark	Zach Calig	Unaired	N/A
8	"Broken Teeth of the Ungodly"	Bobby Roth	Dan Dworkin & Jay Beattie	Unaired	N/A
9	"No King is Saved"	Ericson Core	Paul Eckstein & Angela LaManna	Unaired	N/A
