= For No Good Reason =

- Film poster
- Directed by: Charlie Paul
- Produced by: Lucy Paul
- Starring: Ralph Steadman; Johnny Depp; Richard E. Grant; Terry Gilliam; Jann Wenner
- Cinematography: Charlie Paul
- Edited by: Joby Gee
- Music by: Ed Harcourt; Sacha Skarbek; Slash; Jason Mraz; Thom Crawford
- Release dates: October 12, 2012 (London Film Festival); April 25, 2014 (United States)
- Running time: 89 minutes
- Countries: United States; Great Britain
- Language: English

For No Good Reason is a 2012 American-British documentary film about Ralph Steadman, directed by Charlie Paul. The film was in competition for the Grierson Award for Best Documentary at the 2012 BFI London Film Festival.

It premiered at the 2012 London Film Festival, and was released in 2014 in the United States.

== Cast ==
- Ralph Steadman as himself
- Johnny Depp as himself
- Richard E. Grant as himself
- Terry Gilliam as himself
- Jann Wenner as himself
- Hunter S. Thompson as himself
- Hal Willner as himself
- Patrick Godfrey as Leonardo da Vinci (voice)
