= Sally El Hosaini =

Welsh-Egyptian film director and screenwriter

Sally El-Hosaini
- سالي الحسيني
- Born: Swansea, Wales
- Education: Cairo American College United World College of the Atlantic

Sally El-Hosaini (Arabic: سالى الحسينى [ˈsæːli (ʔe)lħoˈseːni]) is a Welsh-Egyptian BAFTA winning film director and screenwriter.

== Background ==
El-Hosaini was born in Swansea, Wales, of Egyptian and Welsh parentage, and raised in Cairo, Egypt.

El-Hosaini completed her high school education at Atlantic College, one of the United World Colleges, in Wales. She went on to read Arabic with Middle Eastern Studies at Durham University.

Before making films she taught English literature at a girls' school in Sana'a, Yemen, and worked for Amnesty International.

She is a long-time resident of Hackney, London.

== Career ==
El Hosaini was a trainee to the late renegade theatre director, John Sichel. She began her career working on Middle East documentaries and then moved to independent feature films, where she was a production coordinator for many years. She has stated that her work in British television documentaries felt "formulaic", and that she found she could be more truthful in fiction.

She was the script editor/specialist researcher of the BAFTA and Emmy Award winning HBO Films/BBC Drama mini-series House of Saddam. She spent 2 1/2 years in research for the series, which won a Grierson Award for best factual drama.

In 2009, her short film Henna Night was officially selected for the London Lesbian and Gay Film Festival. It was in competition at the International Film Festival Rotterdam and the Raindance Film Festival.

El-Hosaini was named one of Screen International's UK Stars of Tomorrow for 2009. She also participated in the 2009 Sundance Directors and Screenwriters Labs, developing My Brother the Devil.

Her debut feature film My Brother the Devil won awards internationally, including at the 2013 Evening Standard Film Awards, 2012 Sundance Film Festival, 2012 Berlin International Film Festival and 2012 BFI London Film Festival Awards, amongst others. It stars Fady Elsayed, BIFA-winning James Krishna Floyd and César Award nominated actor Saïd Taghmaoui.

My Brother the Devil was released theatrically in the US, May 2013 and had a wide release in UK cinemas, November 2012. Further releases in Canada, Australia, New Zealand & Germany. The film screened at over 40 International Film Festivals, where it received 12 awards, 17 nominations & an Honourable Mention.

As Writer/Director of the film, El-Hosaini won the Most Promising Newcomer Award at 2013 Evening Standard Film Awards, Best Screenplay at the 2013 Writer's Guild of Great Britain Awards, the Best Newcomer Award at the 2012 BFI London Film Festival and the UK New Talent Award at the British Women in Film and Television Awards in 2012. She was also nominated for the BIFA Douglas Hickox award for Best Debut Film at the British Independent Film Awards and the Sutherland Trophy (Best First Film) at BFI London Film Festival.

In 2014 she was chosen by Danny Boyle to direct Babylon, the television series he co-created and produced with Jesse Armstrong for Channel 4 and SundanceTV. She has been profiled by The Guardian, BBC America, IndieWire, and Variety who named her a 2014 "Brit to Watch".

El-Hosaini's next feature, The Swimmers, depicts the harrowing real-life journey of Syrian refugee sisters Yusra Mardini and Sara Mardini. The film opened the 2022 Toronto International Film Festival and Zurich Film Festival as well as having a Special Presentation at the 2022 BFI London Film Festival. It was subsequently released in cinemas and on Netflix worldwide in November that same year, to critical acclaim. In its first week on Netflix, starting November 23, 2022, it was a global hit, achieving no.1 in 15 countries and top 10 in 85 countries. In its second week from November 28, 2022, it increased its viewership and climbed to no.2 globally on the platform.The film was Nominated for a 2022 BAFTA Award for Outstanding British Film. El-Hosaini went on to win the TIFF Emerging Talent Award at the 2022 TIFF Tribute Awards at the Toronto International Film Festival and the BAFTA Cymru award for Best Director at the 2023 BAFTA Cymru Awards.

== Filmography ==
Short film

Year	Title	Director	Writer
2008	The Fifth Bowl	Yes	Yes
2009	Henna Night	Yes	Yes

Feature film

Year	Title	Director	Writer	Executive Producer	Notes
2013	My Brother the Devil	Yes	Yes	Yes	
2022	The Swimmers	Yes	Yes	No	
2023	Unicorns	Yes	No	Yes	Co-directed with James Krishna Floyd

Television

Year	Title	Notes
2014	Babylon	3 episodes

== Awards ==
- Won BAFTA Cymru for Best Director at BAFTA Cymru Awards - 2023 for The Swimmers
- Nominated for BAFTA Award for Outstanding British Film – 2022 British Academy Film Awards for The Swimmers
- Won TIFF Emerging Talent Award for The Swimmers at the 2022 TIFF Tribute Awards - Toronto International Film Festival.
- Won Best European Film (Europa Cinemas Label Award) – 2012 Berlinale for My Brother the Devil
- Won Best Newcomer – 2012 BFI London Film Festival for My Brother the Devil
- Won Most Promising Newcomer – 2013 Evening Standard Film Awards for My Brother the Devil
- Won Best Screenplay – 2013 Writer's Guild of Great Britain Awards for My Brother the Devil
- Won UK New Talent Award – 2012 British Women in Film and Television Awards
- Won Grand Jury Award – 2012 LA Outfest for My Brother the Devil
- Won BAFTA Cymru – 2008 Short Film, "The Fifth Bowl"
- Honourable Mention 'Outstanding First Feature Award' – 2012 Frameline Film Festival, San Francisco for My Brother the Devil
- Nominated Grand Jury Prize – 2012 Sundance Film Festival for My Brother the Devil
- Nominated BIFA Douglas Hickox award for Best Debut Film – 2012 British Independent Film Awards for My Brother the Devil
- Nominated Sutherland Trophy (Best First Film) – 2012 BFI London Film Festival for My Brother the Devil
