= The Comedian (2012 film) =

2012 film

- Film poster
- Directed by: Tom Shkolnik
- Written by: Tom Shkolnik
- Starring: Edward Hogg; Nathan Stewart-Jarrett; Elisa Lasowski; Steven Robertson; Brett Goldstein; Gerard Murphy
- Cinematography: Benjamin Kračun
- Edited by: Pierre Haberer
- Distributed by: BFI; Trinity Filmed Entertainment; Revolver Entertainment
- Release date: October 2012 (Dinard Festival)
- Running time: 78 minutes
- Country: United Kingdom
- Language: English

The Comedian is a 2012 British drama film, written and directed by Tom Shkolnik as his feature debut. The movie was shot in central London and follows the life of Ed (Edward Hogg) as it attempts to paint a vivid picture of the city. Shkolnik was nominated for Best Newcomer at the 2012 London Film Festival.

== Plot ==
Ed works an office job as a cancer insurance call-centre operator by day, a job he seems not to enjoy, especially as he's in his early thirties. The movie details the hardships faced in London as Ed moonlights as a stand-up comedian, and shows the different dilemmas faced by bisexual men as Ed experiences turmoil—emotional, sexual and professional—and ends up retreating into himself to observe his environs. His personal life is also in disarray as he is torn between a newfound love, artist Nathan (Nathan Stewart-Jarrett), and his best friend and flatmate Elisa, who develops issues with the boyfriend.

In the end, Ed arguably sees the proverbial light at the end of the tunnel after a taxi ride with a Zimbabwean driver, feeling sparks of hope in his seemingly failing life.
