= Louis Talpe =

Belgian actor

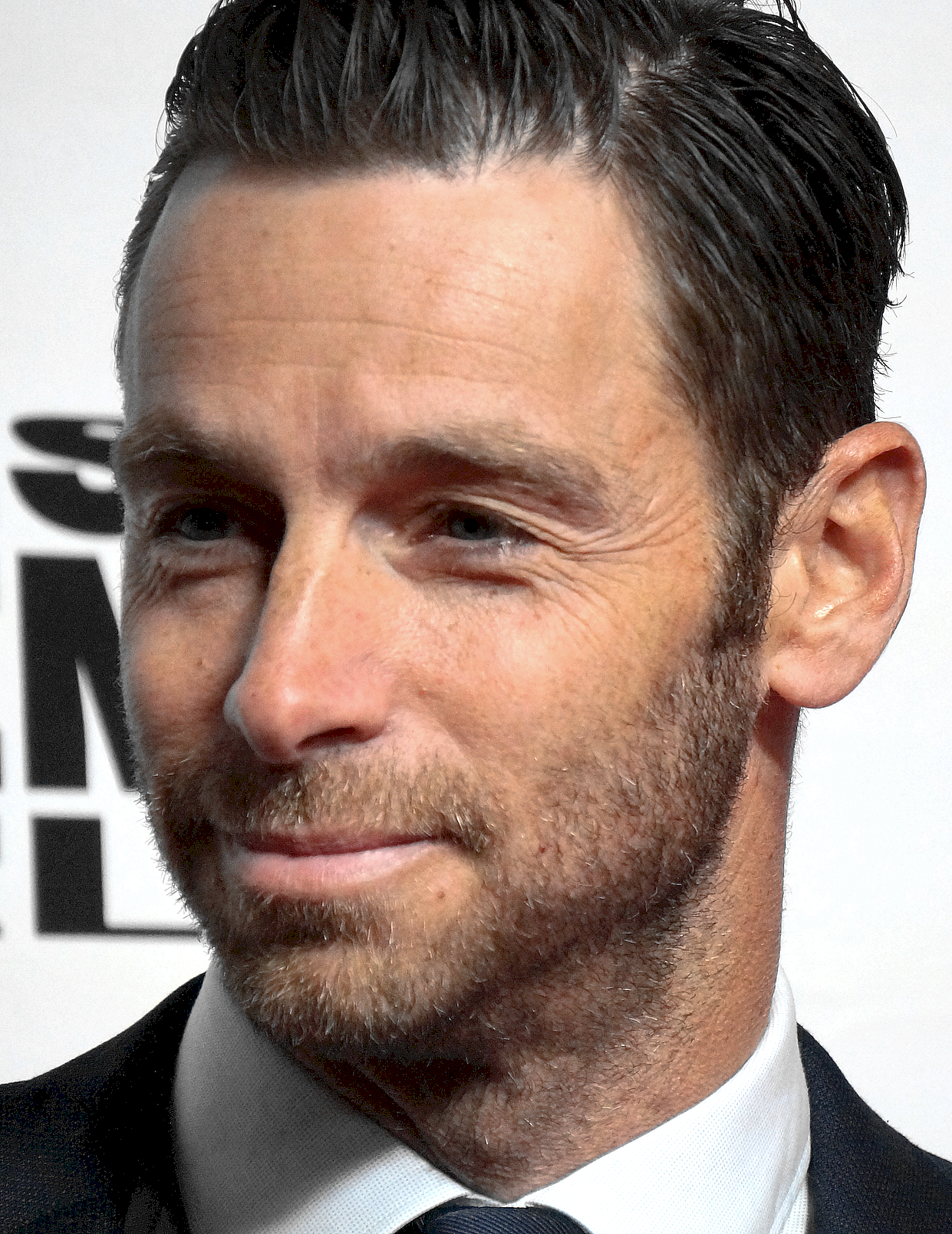
- Born: 22 May 1981 (age 45); Kortemark, Belgium
- Occupation: Actor
- Years active: 2003–present
- Website: http://www.louistalpe.be

Louis Talpe (born 22 May 1981) is a Belgian actor. He is known for playing Toby on the Studio 100 show Mega Mindy and has appeared most recently as Eliab on the ABC-produced drama Of Kings and Prophets.

== Career ==
Talpe was born in Kortemark and performed in guest roles including in the shows 16+, Spring, The Kotmadam and Rupel. In 2006, he landed a role as Toby in Mega Mindy, a production of Studio 100. From September 2008 to January 2009, Talpe was busy shooting the VRT series Goesting.

On 5 March 2012, Talpe appeared as Mike Brandt in the soap opera Good times, bad times. On 29 August 2013, it was announced that Talpe would play the role of DJ Lo-Tus in the television show Love with Ibiza.

In 2015, he played the role of Roel Thevange in the TV show Spitbroers. He will be playing Vincent in the upcoming film Wat Mannen Willen (2015), his first role in a film for a long time.

== Television ==
=== Fixed roles ===
Title	Role	Type of Program	Broadcaster	Year
Mega Mindy	Toby	Children	Ketnet	2006 to present
Slot Marsepeinstein	Captain Wachter	Children	Nickelodeon	2009
Goesting	Hannes Blondeel	Fiction series	One	2010
Goede tijden, slechte tijden	Mike Brandt	Soap opera	RTL 4	2012 to 2013
Fall in love with Ibiza	dj Lo-Tus	television	SBS6	2013
Aspe	Eric Vranckx	television	Vtm	2014
De Ridder	Thomas De Kuyper	television	One	From autumn 2014
Spitsbroers	Thevenage	television	Vtm	Spring 2015
De zoon van Artan	Artan	television	Ketnet	2015
Of Kings and Prophets	Eliab	television	ABC	2016
Onder Vuur	Orlando Foncke	television	Eén	2021-2024

== Film ==
Title	Role	Year
The Secret of Mega Mindy	Toby / Mega Toby	2009
Daijobu (short film)	Louie	2010
Mega Mindy and the Black Crystal	Toby	2010
Gooische Vrouwen	Bellhop	2011
Mega Mindy en de Snoepbaron	Toby / Mega Toby	2011
The Club of Sinterklaas and Piet School	Vader Lucas	2013
FC Champions 2: Jubilee General	Savior in helicopter	2015
Wat mannen willen (What men want)	Vincent	2015
Niet Schieten	Gilbert Van de Steen	2018
The Racer	Dominique Chabol	2020
iHostage	Winston	2025

== Musicals ==
There are now two musicals produced of the show Mega Mindy. Talpe performed in these two musicals as agent Toby. The first musical, Mega Mindy and the Brilliant Emerald ran between 2008 and 2009 in both Belgium and the Netherlands. This was followed by Mega Mindy and the Doll Master in 2010.

In 2014, Talpe starred in the musical spectacle '14 -'18.
