= Roger Nsengiyumva =

Rwandan actor (born 1994)

Roger Jean Nsengiyumva
- Born: Jean Roger Nsengiyumva Cadeaux; 1 May 1994 (age 31)
- Occupation: Actor
- Known for: Armchair Detectives; Sixteen; Tomb Raider

Roger Jean Nsengiyumva is a British-Rwandan actor, best known for his appearances in films Africa United and Sixteen and television series Informer and You Don’t Know Me.

== Early life ==
Nsengiyumva grew up in Norfolk in the United Kingdom after fleeing from the 1994 Genocide against the Tutsi in Rwanda. Nsengiyumva was born in Kigali, and lost his father during the Genocide against the Tutsi in 1994.

== Filmography ==
=== Filmography ===
Year	Title	Role	Notes
2010	Africa United	Fabrice	
2013	Sixteen	Jumah	
2017	Wale	Rondo	Short film
2018	Tomb Raider	Rog	

=== Television ===
Year	Title	Role	Channel	Notes
2011	Postcode	Jamal	CBBC	
2011	Planet of the Apemen: Battle for Earth	Baako	BBC One	
2014	Chasing Shadows	Cole Eli	ITV	Off Radar: Part One; Off Radar: Part Two
2017	Armchair Detectives	DC Slater	BBC One	
2018	Informer	Dadir Hassan	BBC One	
2021	You Don’t Know Me	Jamil (aka JC)	BBC	4 episodes
2024	Time Bandits	Widgit	Apple TV+	
2025	The Crow Girl	Amar	Paramount+	
