= Time Bandits (TV series) =

2024 fantasy adventure series

- Promotional poster
- Genre: Fantasy; Adventure; Comedy
- Created by: Jemaine Clement; Iain Morris; Taika Waititi
- Based on: Characters by: Terry Gilliam; Michael Palin
- Starring: Lisa Kudrow; Kal-El Tuck; Tadhg Murphy; Roger Jean Nsengiyumva; Rune Temte; Lo Mutuc (Note: Credited as Charlyne Yi); Rachel House; Kiera Thompson
- Composer: Mark Mothersbaugh
- Countries of origin: United States; United Kingdom; New Zealand; Canada
- Original languages: English; German
- No. of episodes: 10

Production
- Executive producers: Taika Waititi; Jemaine Clement; Iain Morris; Garrett Basch; Jane Stanton
- Running time: 31-46 minutes
- Production companies: Waititi; HandMade Films; Waka Atea; Anonymous Content; MRC Television; Paramount Television Studios

Original release
- Network: Apple TV+
- Release: July 24 – August 21, 2024

Time Bandits is a fantasy adventure television series created by Jemaine Clement, Iain Morris, and Taika Waititi, loosely based on characters from the 1981 film Time Bandits (directed by Terry Gilliam). The series premiered on July 24, 2024 on Apple TV+. On September 16, 2024, the series was canceled after one season.

== Premise ==
The comedic series, which has something of a British sense of humour, is about a ragtag group of thieves and their newest recruit, an eleven-year-old history nerd (and his quirky younger sister) as they journey into various points of time in the past, throughout various places on the planet Earth. While doing so, they are being pursued by the original and rightful owner of a cosmic map of space and time (which might have been God), as well as other more nefarious parties also seeking possession of the map.

On September 16, 2024, Apple TV+ canceled the series after one season, leaving the series hanging on something of a cliffhanger.

== Cast ==
=== Main ===
- Lisa Kudrow as Penelope
- Kal-El Tuck as Kevin
- Tadhg Murphy as Alto
- Roger Jean Nsengiyumva as Widgit
- Rune Temte as Bittelig
- Lo Mutuc as Judy
- Rachel House as Fianna
- Kiera Thompson as Saffron

=== Recurring ===
- Jonathan Brugh as Damon
- Jemaine Clement as Pure Evil
- Taika Waititi as Supreme Being
- James Dryden as Mr. Haddock
- Felicity Ward as Mrs. Haddock
- Shane Rangi as Demon
- Francesca Mills as Detective Katherine
- Imaan Hadchiti as Sergeant Lewis

=== Guest ===
- Marley Mackrill as Mikey Haddock
- Ross Noble as Stonehenge builder
- Zoë Ventoura as Cassandra
- Nikita Chronis as Xanthus
- Jose Palma as Balam Cupul
- Génesis Mancheren Ab'äj as Lady Sak K'uk
- Con O'Neill as the Sheriff of Nottingham
- Matt King as De Plume
- Shaun Micallef as Town Mayor
- George Houvardas as Ajax the Lesser
- Mark Gatiss as John Montagu, 4th Earl of Sandwich
- Hammed Animashaun as Mansa Musa
- Kountry Wayne as Bumpy Johnson

== Episodes ==
No.	Title	Directed by	Teleplay by	Original release date
1	"Kevin Haddock"	Taika Waititi	Jemaine Clement & Iain Morris & Taika Waititi	July 24, 2024
2	"Mayan"	Taika Waititi	Jemaine Clement & Iain Morris & Taika Waititi	July 24, 2024
3	"Medieval"	Jackie van Beek	Jemaine Clement & Iain Morris	July 31, 2024
4	"Prohibition"	Jeff Tomsic	Akilah Green	July 31, 2024
5	"Georgian"	Jeff Tomsic	Melanie Bracewell	August 7, 2024
6	"Mansa Musa"	Armagan Ballantyne	Tyrell Williams	August 7, 2024
7	"Ice Age"	Jemaine Clement	Jemaine Clement	August 14, 2024
8	"Home Again"	Yana Gorskaya	Jemaine Clement	August 14, 2024
9	"Pell-Mell"	Iain Morris	Sam Bain	August 21, 2024
10	"Fortress of Darkness"	Tim van Dammen	Iain Morris	August 21, 2024

== Production ==
In July 2018, it was announced that Apple Inc. had closed a deal to develop a television series version of the Terry Gilliam film, with Gilliam set to serve as executive producer. In March 2019, Taika Waititi joined the project, set to co-write and direct the pilot episode. Waititi stated the series would be 10 episodes, and revealed to be a co-writer alongside Iain Morris and Jemaine Clement. In September 2022, Lisa Kudrow was cast.

Production took place in New Zealand and Toronto in late 2022 and early 2023. The series was shot in Wellington, appearing as 1920s New York when shooting began in October 2022.

Time Bandits made significant use of practical effects in order to match Terry Gilliam's original 1981 film. Miniature effects were employed for various scenes, including Chinese ships, a Mayan pyramid, parts of the Fortress of Darkness, and Kevin's bedroom, while oil-painted matte paintings were used for certain background shots. To create animals such as the woolly mammoth, rhinoceros, and saber-tooth tiger, the show utilized a combination of animatronics, puppets, and creature suits. Additionally, the series features nearly 5000 computer-generated visual effects shots, some created using blue-screen and green-screen techniques, while others were filmed in the Volume with LED screens to generate backgrounds.

== Release ==
Time Bandits premiered on July 24, 2024, on Apple TV+. The show was released two episodes a week through August 21, 2024.

== Reception ==
The review aggregator website Rotten Tomatoes reported an 76% approval rating with an average rating of 7.1/10, based on 51 critic reviews. The website's critics consensus reads, "This reimagining of Time Bandits swaps out the original film's eccentricity for a more family-friendly sensibility, delivering an energetic adventure that gets more absorbing as it goes along." Metacritic, which uses a weighted average, assigned a score of 66 out of 100 based on 28 critics, indicating "generally favorable reviews".

== Controversy ==
In 2024, Lo Mutuc said that while filming the series, a male actor constantly assaulted them, injuring their back. Mutuc claimed the actor in question attempted to gaslight producers and HR about the incident to protect his image. However, following Mutuc's complaint, multiple individuals and witnesses were interviewed as part of the full investigation, but none of Mutuc's claims could be substantiated.
