= Sixteen (2013 British film) =

- Sixteen
- Directed by: Rob Brown
- Written by: Rob Brown
- Starring: Roger Nsengiyumva; Rachael Stirling; Rosie Day; Fady Elsayed; Sam Spruell
- Cinematography: Justin Brown
- Edited by: Barry Moen
- Music by: John Bowen
- Production company: Seize Films
- Distributed by: Movie Partnership
- Release date: 2013
- Running time: 80 minutes
- Country: United Kingdom
- Language: English

SIXTEEN is the debut feature from Rob Brown starring Roger Nsengiyumva, Rosie Day, Rachael Stirling, Fady Elsayed, Sam Spruell, and Deon Williams. Sixteen was first premiered at the 2013 BFI London Film Festival. It was nominated for The Sutherland Award for Best Debut Feature, and director Rob Brown was nominated for Best British Newcomer.
