= James Krishna Floyd =

British actor (b. 1985)

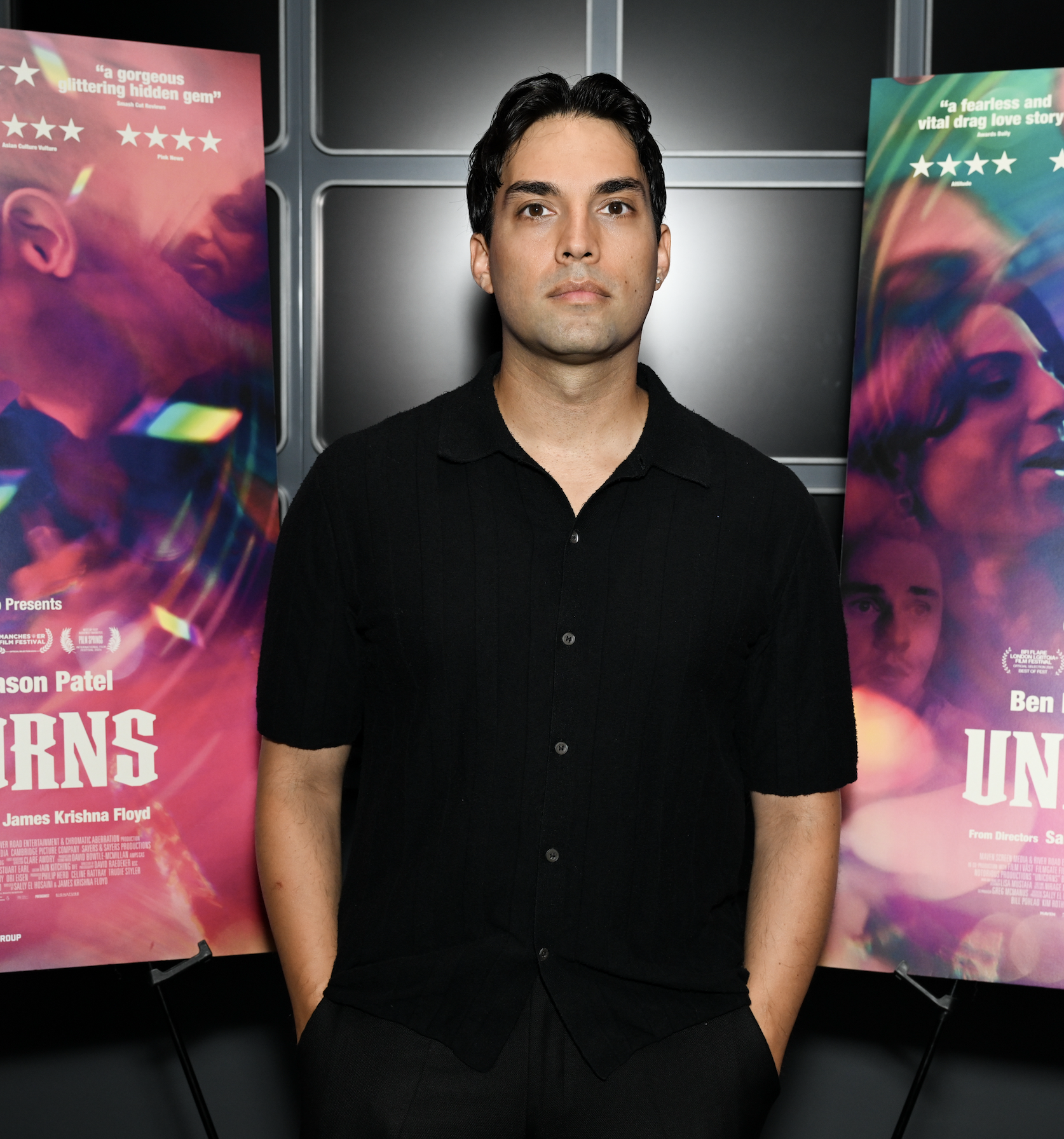
- Floyd in 2025
- Born: 27 August 1985 (age 41); Kings Cross, London, England
- Education: London School of Economics; National Youth Theatre; University College School
- Occupations: Actor and filmmaker
- Years active: 2006–present

James Krishna Floyd (born 27 August 1985) is a British actor, director and writer. As an actor he was named a BAFTA Breakthrough Brit and has won a British Independent Film Award. As a director and writer he has been nominated for two British Independent Film Awards.

His films include the acclaimed drama My Brother the Devil, the popular Netflix refugee epic The Swimmers (2022) and his filmmaking debut, the romantic drama Unicorns (2024). On television, he is known for starring in the popular UK series The Good Karma Hospital (2017–2022) and the international hit Hulu drama No Man's Land (2021–2025).

== Early life ==
Floyd was born in Kings Cross, London and grew up in North West London with his parents. His mother is Indian Tamil, and his father is English with Scottish ancestry. Floyd's father was a civil servant, working as a probation officer in Tottenham and Holloway, and his mother taught English to refugees and Category A prisoners at HM Prison Wormwood Scrubs. Floyd grew up attending plays at the Royal Shakespeare Company, which he later credits as his inspiration for his acting career.

Floyd won a government scholarship to the independent secondary school UCS in London, UK, because his parents' income was low enough, and his state school grades were exceptional. He attended the London School of Economics and Political Science (LSE) studying Philosophy, Logic and Scientific Method but left to pursue a career in theatre. He trained at the RADA Youth Summer Program at the Old Vic and later became an alumnus of the National Youth Theatre.

== Career ==
=== Theatre ===
Floyd began his career attending open auditions through the National Youth Theatre in London making his stage debut as one of the chorus in Antigone at Hell’s Mouth performed at the Soho Theatre. In 2005, he landed a lead in Totally Practically Naked in My Room on a Wednesday Night performed at the Tristan Bates Theatre. Despite this, he struggled for many years to make ends meet, working as an usher at the Strand Theatre and teaching maths to young students while auditioning.

In 2007, Floyd starred as a young alcoholic indigenous Canadian in J.B. Priestley’s play The Glass Cage at the Royal & Derngate theatre, directed by Laurie Sansom. And in 2008, he played Ali, a Pakistani student from Detroit in Anna Ziegler’s Dov and Ali at Theatre503.

=== Film ===
Floyd’s first starring film role was the 2011 coming-of-age drama Everywhere and Nowhere, in which he played a British Pakistani teenager who has a passion for music and DJing. The film played at the Mumbai Film Festival and Dinard Film Festival, and was released in the UK, Europe, and the Middle East.

In 2012, Floyd starred in the 2013 drama My Brother the Devil, a tale of two British-Egyptian brothers growing up on a tough council estate in Hackney, East London. It was Sally El Hosaini’s debut film as a writer/director, and Floyd starred as "Rash", a young drug-dealing boxer with a secret. To prepare for the role, Floyd spent five months living with Hackney gang members and training as a boxer in order to “to get my head around how these guys really think and feel.” After his performance, Time Out reported that Floyd “be on every director’s must-cast list.” Later that year, he signed with United Talent Agency in Los Angeles.

In 2015, Floyd played the lead role of Alex Harks, an American orphan caught up in a private spy ring in the thriller Rogue Agent, executive produced by Brian Kavanaugh-Jones and co-starring Anthony LaPaglia. In 2017, Floyd co-starred as a rags-to-riches British Indian businessman in British noir City of Tiny Lights alongside Riz Ahmed, Billie Piper and Cush Jumbo. The film was directed by Pete Travis and produced by Rebecca O’Brien.

In 2021 Floyd starred as a lonely British man seeking online connection in the romantic comedy Love in a Bottle, directed by Oscar nominee Paula van der Oest. In 2023 he co-starred as the Afghan refugee "Emad" in Netflix's drama The Swimmers, directed by Sally El Hosaini, written by Jack Thorne and produced by Working Title Films, it was a big hit on the platform and nominated for the BAFTA Award for Outstanding British Film. It achieved no.1 in 15 countries and top 10 in 85 countries on Netflix, and in its second week it increased its viewership even more and climbed to no.2 globally on the platform. In 2024 he directed and wrote the romance film Unicorns which was nominated for seven British Independent Film Awards, including Best Debut Director and Best Debut Screenwriter for Floyd.

=== Television ===
In 2007 Floyd played the role of footballer Miguel Lopez in the British TV series Dream Team. In 2009 he appeared in the TV Film Compulsion (based on Jacobean tragedy The Changeling), alongside Ray Winstone and Parminder Nagra. In 2012 he appeared as a Spanish bullfighter in Seville set crime series Falcón for Sky Atlantic. He portrayed Freddie Mercury in the 2013 BAFTA-winning BBC biopic The Best Possible Taste. In 2016, he starred as Ishbaal, prince of the Israelites, in the ABC drama Of Kings and Prophets. From 2017 to 2022, Floyd starred as the enigmatic Indian doctor Gabriel Varma in the ITV series The Good Karma Hospital, which was very popular on the Sunday evening primetime slot, peaking at 8.13 million viewers.

From 2021 to 2025 Floyd stars as a lead role in the drama thriller series No Man's Land for Hulu, alongside Souheila Yacoub and James Purefoy. Floyd plays "Nasser Yassin", an ex-British soldier who goes undercover in Syria. Arte-tv in Germany gave it the title Kampf um den Halbmond and released it as Web-stream. Series 2 of will premiere on Hulu and Arte in 2025 with James reprising his lead role. The first season was an international hit across 114 territories.

=== Commercial ===
Floyd starred in the popular Nokia commercial 'Best Friends', directed by Emmy nominee Justin Chadwick and shot by Camerimage winning cinematographer, Mátyás Erdély. It received almost 4 million views on YouTube.

== Personal life ==
Floyd lives in London. He has a son, who was born in 2016. In October 2017, Floyd added his middle name Krishna to his official stage name James Floyd.

Floyd supports a number of charities, including Kiva, It Gets Better Project and the Disasters Emergency Committee. In October 2020, he raised money for a girls orphanage in Sri Lanka, that shut down during the Coronavirus pandemic.

== Awards ==
- Best Debut Director nomination, British Independent Film Award (2024)
- Best Debut Screenwriter nomination, British Independent Film Award (2024)
- Audience Award winner, Dinard Film Festival (2024)
- Special Jury Prize winner, Dinard Film Festival (2024)
- BAFTA Breakthrough Brit (2013)
- Most Promising Newcomer winner, British Independent Film Award (2012)
- Best Male Actor winner, Milan Film Festival (2012)
- Most Promising Newcomer nomination, Evening Standard Film Award (2013)
- Screen International Star of Tomorrow (2012)

== Filmography ==
=== Theatre ===
- The Glass Cage at the Royal & Derngate
- Dov & Ali at Theatre503
- Totally Practically Naked... at the Tristan Bates Theatre
- Antigone at Hell's Mouth at the Soho Theatre

=== Film ===
Year	Title	Role	Notes
2009	Tormented	Nasser	Feature film
2010	The Infidel	Gary Page	Feature film
2011	Everywhere and Nowhere	Ash Khan	Feature film
2011	Spirit	Jags	Short film
2012	My Brother the Devil	Rashid	Feature film
2014	Hollow	Priest	Short film
2015	Rogue Agent	Alex Harks	Feature film
2016	City of Tiny Lights	Lovely	Feature film
2017	Rearview	Simon	Feature film
2018	Ostrich	Will Hewitt	Short film
2020	All on a Summer's Day	Simon	Feature film
2021	Love in a Bottle	Miles	Feature film
2022	The Swimmers	Emad	Feature film
2024	Unicorns	Director, writer	Feature film

=== Television ===
Year	Title	Role	Notes
2006	Holby City	Anil Chohan	Episode: "Metamorphosis"
2006–2007	Dream Team	Miguel Lopez	
2008	Compulsion	Jaiman	TV movie
2012	Best Possible Taste: The Kenny Everett Story	Freddie Mercury	TV movie
2012	Falcón	Rafa Falcon	Episodes: "The Blind Man of Seville" "The Silent and the Damned"
2016	Of Kings and Prophets	Ishbaal	
2017–22	The Good Karma Hospital	Dr Gabriel Varma	Series 1, 2, 3 & 4
2021-25	No Man's Land	Nasser Yassin	Hulu Series 1 & 2
