= My Favourite Fabric =

2018 film directed by Gaya Jiji

- Film poster
- Directed by: Gaya Jiji
- Written by: Gaya Jiji
- Starring: Metin Akdülger
- Release dates: 11 May 2018 (Cannes); 7 June 2019 (Turkey)
- Countries: France; Germany; Turkey
- Language: Arabic

My Favourite Fabric (French: Mon tissu préféré) is a 2018 internationally co-produced drama film directed by Gaya Jiji. It was screened in the Un Certain Regard section at the 2018 Cannes Film Festival.

== Cast ==
- Metin Akdülger as The dream man
- Manal Issa as Nahla
- Ula Tabari as Madame Jiji
- Gaya Jiji as Manal
- Wissam Fares as Salem
- Saad Lostan as Samir
- Amani Ibrahim as Shirin
- Rand Raslan as Samar
- Nathalie Issa as Line
- Thuraya Baghdadi as Salwa (Souraya Baghdadi)
- Mariah Tannoury as Myriam
- Hala Sayasne as Zahra
