= Love in a Bottle =

2021 Dutch film

- Directed by: Paula van der Oest
- Written by: Paula van der Oest
- Produced by: Alain de Levita; Paula van der Oest; Mark van Eeuwen
- Starring: Hannah Hoekstra; James Krishna Floyd
- Cinematography: Guido van Gennep
- Edited by: Michiel Boesveldt
- Music by: Nico Maas
- Distributed by: September Film
- Release date: May 21, 2021
- Running time: 80 minutes
- Country: Netherlands
- Language: English

Love in a Bottle is a Dutch romantic comedy directed by Paula van der Oest.

== Plot ==
Two people in different countries fall in love over videocalls during the COVID-19 pandemic.

== Reception ==
De Volkskrant liked the film but said the plot got quite straining at points. The film also received mixed reviews from Trouw, NRC Handelsblad and Algemeen Dagblad.
