= The Racer (film) =

2020 film

- Theatrical release poster
- Directed by: Kieron J. Walsh
- Written by: Ciaran Cassidy; Kieron J. Walsh
- Produced by: Yvonne Donohoe; Katie Holly
- Starring: Louis Talpe; Matteo Simoni; Tara Lee; Iain Glen; Karel Roden
- Cinematography: James Mather
- Edited by: Mathieu Depuydt; Nico Poedts
- Music by: Hannes De Maeyer
- Production companies: Blinder Films; Calach Films; Caviar Films
- Distributed by: Gravitas Ventures
- Release dates: 13 March 2020 (SXSW); 9 September 2020 (Belgium); 11 December 2020 (Ireland)
- Running time: 95 minutes
- Countries: Ireland; Luxembourg; Belgium
- Languages: English; French; Italian; Dutch; Spanish; Portuguese; Irish

The Racer is a 2020 sports drama film. The film stars Louis Talpe, Matteo Simoni, Tara Lee, Iain Glen and Karel Roden.

== Cast ==
- Louis Talpe as Dominique "Dom" Chabol
- Matteo Simoni as Lupo "Tartare" Marino
- Tara Lee as Dr. Lynn Brennan
- Iain Glen as Sonny McElhone
- Karel Roden as Viking
- Timo Wagner as Stefano Drago
- Diogo Cid as Enzo
- Ward Kerremans as Lionel Dardonne
- Paul Robert as Erik Schultz

== Production ==
In 2018, a film centering around the 1998 Tour de France, titled The Domestique and to be directed by Kieron J. Walsh and written by Ciarán Cassidy, was announced. Production was taken over by Blinder Films, with the movie receiving €800,000 funding through Screen Ireland, the Irish state development agency. The film has since been renamed The Racer and secured funding from Screen Flanders, the Film Fund Luxembourg, Eurimages, the BAI Sound & Vision Fund, and RTÉ.

== Release ==
It was scheduled to premiere at the 2020 South by Southwest, but was cancelled due to the coronavirus pandemic. Instead, it was showcased in June 2020, at the Cannes online Marché du Film.

== Reception ==
On the review aggregator website Rotten Tomatoes, 85% of 26 critics' reviews are positive, with an average rating of 6.3/10. The website's consensus reads: "The Racer isn't always in top gear, but strong acting and sleek cinematography get this look behind the scenes of the professional bicycling world past the finish line." Metacritic, which uses a weighted average, assigned the film a score of 54 out of 100, based on five critics, indicating "mixed or average" reviews.

== See also ==
- List of films about bicycles and cycling
