= Gerard Murphy (actor) =

Irish Actor (1948–2013)

- Born: Eamon Gerard Murphy; 14 October 1948; Newry, County Down, Northern Ireland
- Died: 26 August 2013 (aged 64); Cambridge, England
- Education: Queen's University Belfast
- Occupation: Actor
- Years active: 1972–2013

Eamon Gerard Murphy (14 October 1948 – 26 August 2013) was a Northern Irish film, television and theatre actor.

== Life and career ==
Born in 1948 in Newry, County Down, Northern Ireland, Murphy began his career on stage with the Glasgow Citizens Theatre, and went on to have a long association with the Royal Shakespeare Company, where he was an Associate Artist, appearing in many productions, including playing Hal in Henry IV, which opened the Barbican Theatre. He branched out into television work with roles in Z-Cars, Doctor Who, Minder, Heartbeat, Father Ted, Dalziel and Pascoe and The Bill. He narrated the BBC Radio version of J. R. R. Tolkien's The Lord of the Rings.

His film roles include the pirate and spy "The Nord" in Waterworld, and as the corrupt High Court Judge Faden in Batman Begins.

Onstage, Murphy portrayed Hector in Alan Bennett's The History Boys, a role previously played by Richard Griffiths, in a national tour co-produced by the West Yorkshire Playhouse and Theatre Royal, Bath and directed by Christopher Luscombe.

In addition, he played Salieri in a 2007 production of Amadeus directed by Nikolai Foster. His final Shakespearean lead, having played so many, was King Lear in a production by Ireland's Second Age Theatre, which opened at the Wexford Opera House, directed by Donnacadh O'Briain. Although suffering in 2012 from spinal cord compression due to prostate cancer, Murphy appeared in Glasgow Citizens Theatre's production of Krapp's Last Tape by Samuel Beckett, his final stage appearance.

Murphy died on 26 August 2013 in Cambridge, of prostate cancer, which he had battled for more than two years. He was 64.

== Filmography ==
Year	Title	Role	Notes
1981	Nighthawks	Detective Mooney	Uncredited
1985	Sacred Hearts	Father Larkin	
1995-1998	McCallum	DI Braken	
1995	Waterworld	Nord	
1997	This Is the Sea	Unknown	Voice
2005	Batman Begins	Judge Faden	
2009	Pumpgirl	Shawshank	
2012	The Comedian	Unknown	(final film role)

== Selected theatre ==
- Dreaming by Peter Barnes. World premiere directed by Matthew Lloyd at the Royal Exchange, Manchester. (1999)
- Phil Hogan in A Moon for the Misbegotten by Eugene O’Neill. Directed by Matthew Lloyd at the Royal Exchange, Manchester. (2001)
- The title role in Volpone by Ben Jonson. Directed by Greg Hersov at the Royal Exchange, Manchester. (2004)
- Chorus in Henry V. Directed by Jonathon Munby at the Royal Exchange, Manchester. (2007)
