= Seán Binder =

German human rights activist (born 1996)

- Born: 1996 (age 29–30)
- Citizenship: Germany
- Education: International Relations (MA)
- Alma mater: Trinity College, Dublin, London School of Economics
- Occupation: Human rights activist
- Known for: Humanitarian aid for refugees on Lesbos island
- Partner: Sarah Mardini

Seán Binder (born 1996) is a German human rights activist and certified rescue diver. The son of a refugee father from Vietnam and a German mother, he grew up in Ireland and later studied at universities in Dublin and London. From 2017 to 2018, he volunteered with a Greek humanitarian non-governmental organization on Lesbos island, Greece, assisting refugees arriving in small boats from the nearby Turkish coast.

Along with Syrian refugee and human rights activist Sarah Mardini, Binder was arrested in 2018 and accused by Greek authorities of espionage, aiding illegal immigration and belonging to a criminal organization. These charges have been refuted by human rights organizations such as Amnesty International, denouncing the accusations against Binder, Mardini and other humanitarian workers as criminalization of humanitarian acts.

Following more than seven years of repeated legal proceedings, a court on the Greek island of Lesbos ruled on 15 January 2026 that “All defendants are acquitted of the charges” because their aim was “not to commit criminal acts but to provide humanitarian aid.”

== Early life and education ==
Binder was born in Germany and moved with his German mother to Castlegregory, a small village on the Western coast of County Kerry, Ireland, at age five. He graduated in political science, economics, sociology and philosophy from Trinity College, Dublin, and also obtained a Master's degree in International Relations at the London School of Economics. Having focused on conflict management during his studies, he decided to work as a volunteer with a Greek NGO to gain practical experience before finding a job. Binder is the son of a German mother and a Vietnamese father, who was a refugee from Vietnam when he met his future wife. This family history has been quoted as one reason for Binder's solidarity and empathy with refugees.

== Activism for refugees, arrest and legal accusations ==
In 2017, Binder travelled to Lesbos, a Greek island about 11 km off the Turkish coastline, to volunteer with Emergency Response Centre International (ERCI), a registered Greek humanitarian NGO for refugees that cooperated with Frontex, the EU’s border management agency, and Greek border authorities. ERCI provided humanitarian aid and organized search-and-rescue operations in the Mediterranean Sea between 2016 and 2018. Further, ERCI had been operating a medical centre in Moria refugee camp, described by Human Rights Watch and other organizations as an "open air prison". During the 2015 European migrant crisis, Lesbos had become a key entry point for refugees coming from Turkey into the European Union, with approximately 5,000 migrants and refugees, mostly fleeing the civil war in Syria, landing on the island’s beaches per day.

At ERCI, Binder met fellow volunteer Sarah Mardini, a Syrian refugee who had fled from her home country in 2015 via Turkey on a dinghy and found refuge first at Lesbos and later obtained political asylum in Germany. Both of them were assisting newly arrived refugees and used their skills as trained swimmers as part of ERCI until 2018. In February 2018 Binder and another member of ERCI were busy on a routine shift, when police arrived and arrested the two volunteers. Released without charge, Binder continued his former activities.

On 21 August 2018, Sarah Mardini was arrested on Lesbos airport, when she intended to return to Germany. The same day, Binder went to the police station to meet with Mardini and was arrested himself. A third member of the NGO, Nassos Karakitsos was arrested shortly afterwards. Binder and Mardini were handcuffed and taken to a courthouse on Lesbos Island.

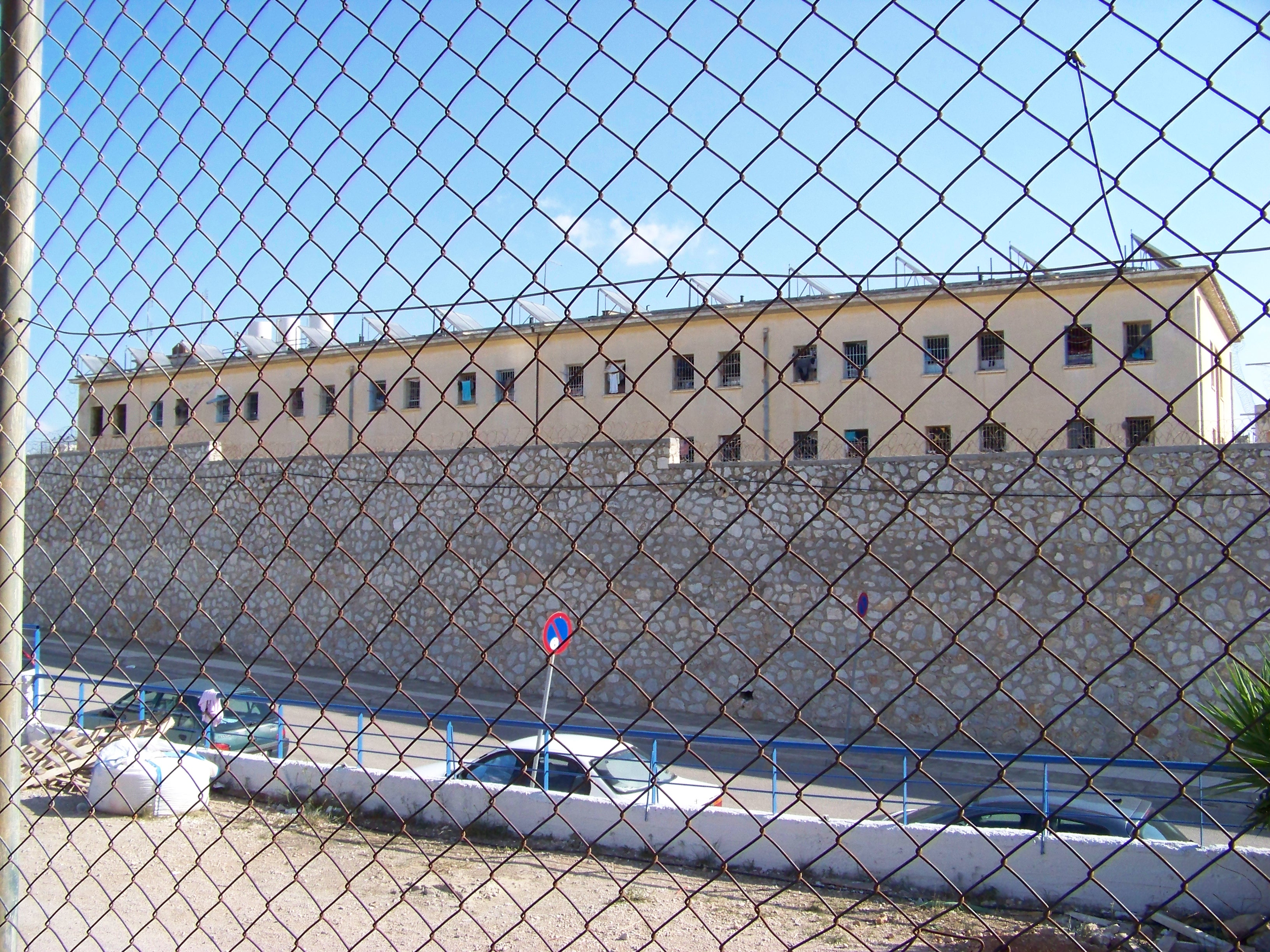
Korydallos Prison, where Mardini and Binder were held during 106 days in pre-trial detention

According to a report in The Guardian, they and two other NGO members were subsequently detained in pre-trial detention in Athens’ high-security Korydallos prison for 106 days. After more than three months in prison, Binder and Mardini were released on 5,000 Euro bail and could leave Greece. Mardini, Binder and further Greek activists for refugees were accused of being members of a criminal organization, human trafficking, money laundering and fraud by Greek authorities. About his time in prison, Binder later said:

You’re supposedly innocent until proven guilty, but what that means in practice is that I was handcuffed to a guy who had murdered two people. I was in a cell with 17 convicted felons.

— Seán Binder, human rights activist accused of illegally helping refugees in Lesbos, Greece,

== Court proceedings and final acquittal ==
The defendants' lawyers said the Greek authorities failed to produce concrete evidence in support of the accusations. If ultimately convicted, the accused could have been sentenced to 25 years in prison. Apart from the 24 former members of ERCI, a number of other humanitarian workers have been facing prosecution in Greece, similar to what happened in Italy, where providing aid to migrants has also been criminalised.

=== First court session ===
On 18 November 2021, the Mytilene misdemeanor court in Lesbos adjourned the legal proceedings against 24 members of ERCI, including Mardini and Binder, "due to lack of jurisdiction of the court" and referred the case to a higher court. On 18 November 2022, Binder, Mardini and Greek fellow defendant Nassos Karakitsos attended their court summons at the first instance court, and declared that they had nothing to add to their earlier statements. Their next trial was set to begin on 10 January 2023, with the accused facing charges classified as misdemeanor crimes, while the felony charges had not been concluded.

=== Second court session ===
The trial of the 24 rescuers, including Binder and Mardini, began on 10 January 2023. On the following 13 January, the court ruled that the charges of espionage against them and the other defendants were at least partially inadmissible, thus following objections by their lawyers. Among other objections, these were the court's initial failure to translate documents for the foreign defendants into a language they could understand as well as faulty documentation of some of the charges. However, the charges of human trafficking remained and the defendants continued to live in insecurity pending a second trial. According to a report in a Greek newsmedia, the verdict was not a complete acquittal for Mardini, Binder and the other defendants, but at least an intermediate win, and also a political signal in a procedure that a report by the European Parliament had called the 'currently largest case of criminalizing solidarity in Europe'.

Following more than four years of protracted legal procedures by the Greek authorities and personal psychological stress and uncertainty after his first arrest, Binder said in 2023 he wanted an immediate further trial, to answer all the felony charges and clear his name. After the acquittal of the charge of espionage, Binder commented to journalists outside the courtroom:

We want this case to be heard. We want justice. Today, there has been less injustice, but no justice.

— Seán Binder, human rights activist,

=== Final acquittal ===
After more than seven years of facing legal charges by Greek courts, on 15 January 2026, Binder, Mardini and all other defendants of the former Emergency Response Center International were acquitted of all felony charges. “All defendants are acquitted of the charges” because their aim was “not to commit criminal acts but to provide humanitarian aid”, presiding judge Vassilis Papathanassiou told the court. The acquittal corresponded to the earlier statement by the prosecutor, who had declared that "no independent basis establishing the criminal liability of the defendants has been demonstrated".

Séan Binder and Mardini were present during the acquittal, with Mardini saying “Saving human lives is not a crime.” and “We never did anything illegal because if helping people is a crime, then we are all criminals.” Binder mentioned the negative effects of the past seven years in an interview with the BBC. Even though he had meanwhile trained as a lawyer, he was not allowed to represent his clients while being indicted himself. The defendants' lawyer called the long duration of the indictements “unacceptable” and stated that the aim of such legal action “was to criminalise humanitarian aid and eliminate humanitarian organisations."

== Statements by human rights organizations ==
Mary Lawlor, UN Special Rapporteur on the Situation of Human Rights Defenders, criticized the Greek authorities' refusal to allow Mardini to be present at the November 2021 court session and said "The fact that authorities have spent more than three years investigating the case has been a deterrent to civil society working for migrant rights in Greece." With regard to the accusations against Mardini and Binder, Lawlor further said: "To what have we come that we go against people who are offering solidarity? A guilty verdict for Ms. Mardini and Mr. Binder would be a dark day for Greece, and a dark day for human rights in Europe."

Giorgos Kosmopoulos, Senior Campaigner on Migration for Amnesty International, was quoted in 2021 as follows: "These trumped-up charges are farcical and should never have resulted in Sarah and Seán appearing in court. Today’s adjournment means that having already waited over three years, this ordeal will continue to drag on for Sarah and Seán, leaving them in limbo. We call for the Greek authorities to uphold their human rights obligations, and drop the charges against Sarah and Seán."

== Scholarly research ==
A 2022 PhD thesis based on interviews in Italy, France and Greece and submitted to the Royal Holloway, University of London, titled The Criminalisation of Pro-Migrant Civil Society in Europe discussed the criminalisation of pro-migrant civil society in Europe as related to the 2015 European migrant crisis. The work and accusations against Binder and Mardini having served as a pilot study on Lesbos island, the thesis named a number of similar cases where NGOs and rescue workers had been criminalized. Based on this research, the author described such cases of accusing NGOs of criminal actions as a trend to use migration for political and electoral discourse. When civil society agents become witness to state and EU security practices that "systematically violate human rights and international law", they have been legally prosecuted.

In a 2025 scholarly paper, Greek judge for civil and criminal law Filippos Kourakis described numerous cases of why and how state authorities in Greece have been criminalizing acts of solidarity with migrants. Referring, among others, to the case of Binder and Mardini, Kourakis stated:

In the context of ‘solidarity crimes’, criminal law in Greece is systematically employed to impose its harshest consequences, permanently excluding the accused, while also negating its protective potential by denying due process rights. Exceptional provisions are routinely and abusively applied in trials concerning human smuggling and the facilitation of illegal entry, leading to the imprisonment of those who act in solidarity with migrants in distress.

— Filippos Kourakis, Criminalizing Solidarity, Regulating the Enemy: Analyzing the Criminalization of Migrant Solidarity through ‘Enemy Under-Criminalization' in Greece

== See also ==
- 2015 European migrant crisis
- Frontex - controversies
