= One-Way to Tomorrow =

2020 film

- Film poster
- Turkish: Yarına Tek Bilet
- Directed by: Ozan Açıktan
- Written by: Faruk Ozerten
- Starring: Metin Akdülger; Dilan Çiçek Deniz; Tevfik Kartal
- Production companies: OG Medya; PToT Films
- Distributed by: Netflix
- Release date: June 19, 2020
- Running time: 90 minutes
- Country: Turkey
- Language: Turkish

One-Way to Tomorrow (Turkish: Yarına Tek Bilet) is a 2020 Turkish drama film directed by Ozan Açıktan and written by Faruk Ozerten. Starring Metin Akdülger and Dilan Çiçek Deniz, the film is a remake of the 2014 Swedish film How to Stop a Wedding.

== Plot ==
A young woman, Leyla, boards a train to Izmir without a ticket. She finds herself sharing a coupé with Ali, a talkative and social young lawyer, on his way to interrupt his ex-girlfriend Burcu's wedding. The two get of to a bumpy start, but as Leyla finds herself in trouble for not having a ticket, Ali decides to help her stay aboard. As the journey is 14 hours they decide to make peace and through the conversation find that their journeys are intertwined in unexpected ways that change their perspective on their plans and each other.

== Cast ==
- Metin Akdülger as Ali
- Dilan Çiçek Deniz as Leyla
- Tevfik Kartal as conductor
- Fatma Filiz Sencan as toll clerk
- Ömür Kayakırılmaz as taxi driver

== Release ==
One-Way to Tomorrow was released on June 19, 2020.
