= My Brother the Devil =

- Theatrical release poster
- Directed by: Sally El Hosaini
- Written by: Sally El Hosaini
- Starring: James Floyd; Fady Elsayed; Saïd Taghmaoui
- Cinematography: David Raedeker
- Edited by: Iain Kitching
- Music by: Stuart Earl
- Distributed by: Verve Pictures
- Release dates: 22 January 2012 (Sundance); 9 November 2012 (United Kingdom); 22 March 2013 (United States)
- Running time: 111 minutes
- Country: United Kingdom
- Language: English
- Box office: $1,200,100

My Brother the Devil is a 2012 British crime drama film written and directed by Sally El Hosaini. It stars James Floyd, Fady Elsayed and Saïd Taghmaoui. It tells the story of two sons of Egyptian immigrants coming of age in east London. It was released in the UK on 9 November 2012 and debuted in US cinemas on 22 March 2013. It was also released in Canada, Germany, Australia and New Zealand.

The film won multiple awards, including Best Cinematography at the 2012 Sundance Film Festival and Best European Film at the 2012 Berlin International Film Festival.

== Plot ==
Mo and Rashid "Rash" are teenage brothers of Egyptian descent living with their parents in Hackney. Elder brother Rash is fiercely protective of Mo, giving him a TV when he does well and encouraging him to stay in school. However Mo begins to want to emulate Rash who works as a low level drug dealer, and is able to use money from his job to pay for small luxuries to make their lives more comfortable.

Mo is robbed by rival gang members while trying to do a drop-off for his brother. He calls Rash and his friends later when he spots the gang members at the corner store near where he lives. The confrontation between Rash's gang and his rival Demon's gang quickly grows violent and after Demon's dog is stabbed Demon retaliates by stabbing and killing Izzi, Rash's best friend.

Rash acquires a gun and plans to shoot Demon in retaliation. He finds Demon at a tattoo parlour but is unable to complete the task after seeing that Demon's little brother is there, wearing the shoes he lifted from Mo. Rash begins to dream of getting out of the gang the way Izzi was planning on doing before he was murdered. He grows close to Sayyid, a French photographer who had been helping Izzi to get legal employment. After he tells Sayyid that he wants to leave the gang Sayyid offers him a job as a photography assistant working with him.

Mo begins to grow jealous of Rash and Sayyid's increasing closeness and the respect that Rash has for him. When he is offered the opportunity to join Rash's gang as a dealer he takes it. In the meantime Sayyid kisses Rash while they are playing around. Initially repulsed at the idea of kissing another man, Rash tries to go back to his old lifestyle. However he finds himself changed and ends up going back to Sayyid and starting a relationship with him. Mo, growing suspicious that Rash is not in fact working, goes to Sayyid's home to spy and sees the two men undressed and realizes what is going on. Angry at his brother, Mo continues to deal drugs and become further entrenched in Rash's old gang. Eventually Rash finds Mo's money and drugs. He confronts his former friends telling them that he will kill Demon in exchange for them allowing Mo to walk away from the drug business and his family to stay safe and unharmed. Upset that Rash has isolated him from his "family" Mo ends up telling Rash's former girlfriend Vanessa that Rash is gay. She spreads it around the neighbourhood and Rash's former friends give him the address of a house belonging to Demon which is actually a set up so they can kill Rash. However Rash manages to escape from the house.

The day after Rash's escape some of his friends go to Mo and tell him that Rash was hurt killing Demon and is hiding out at Sayyid's place. Mo goes with them but becomes suspicious when he sees plastic gloves, the kind that the gang uses for killings, hanging out of one of the men's pockets. Mo leads his friend to the apartment adjacent to Sayyid's. His friend pulls a gun on the woman who answers the door, and when she screams Rash and Sayyid come running out of his building. Mo ends up taking a bullet for Rash as his former friend gets in the car and runs away.

At the hospital Rash is approached by his parents who tell him that Mo will be okay and ask him to forget about Sayyid and come home. Rash refuses.

Sometime later when Mo has been released from the hospital he is approached by Rash outside the building where he lives. He and Rash have a brief conversation and he tells Rash that the family is fine and he doesn't need to return. After they hug Rash walks off towards his new life.

== Cast ==
- James Floyd as Rashid
- Fady Elsayed as Mo
- Saïd Taghmaoui as Sayyid
- Anthony Welsh as Izzi
- Amira Ghazalla as Hanan
- Nasser Memarzia as Abdul-Aziz
- Aymen Hamdouchi as Repo
- Letitia Wright as Aisha
- Yusra Warsama as Sonya
- Elarica Johnson as Vanessa
- Arnold Oceng as AJ
- Shyam Kelly as Devonte
- McKell David as Demon’s Boy
- Zachary Scipio as Demon’s Younger 1
- Ryan Townsend as Demon’s Younger 2
- Malachi Kirby as J-Boy
- Kemi Martin as J-Boy’s Girl
- Mohammed Mansary as Faisal
- Denzel Assiamah as Bobo

== Reception ==
The film received critical acclaim for its direction and performances. David Rooney of The Hollywood Reporter called it "A crackling debut...Slick, muscular, entertaining and emotionally satisfying", while Empire described it as "a compelling gangland saga...crisp, cool and consistently street-smart". John Anderson of Variety said the film is "an energetic and imaginative tale...a film that so artfully refuses to surrender to convention".

It holds a 90% approval rating on Rotten Tomatoes, based on 52 reviews, with an average rating of 7.2/10. The critical consensus states that "A tough, tender tale of familial angst with careful attention to detail, My Brother the Devil is a strong debut from director Sally El Hosaini."

== Awards and nominations ==
- Won Best European Film (Europa Cinemas Label Award) at Berlinale
- Won Best Cinematography at Sundance Film Festival
- Nominated for Grand Jury Prize at Sundance Film Festival
- Won CBA Worldview Sundance Impact Award at Sundance London
- Won Best Newcomer - Sally El Hosaini at BFI London Film Festival
- Nominated Best Newcomer - Fady Elsayed at BFI London Film Festival
- Nominated Sutherland Trophy (Best First Film) - Sally El Hosaini at BFI London Film Festival
- Nominated BIFA Douglas Hickox Award for Best Debut Film - Sally El Hosaini at British Independent Film Awards
- Won Most Promising Newcomer - Sally El Hosaini at Evening Standard British Film Awards
- Nominated Most Promising Newcomer - James Floyd at Evening Standard British Film Awards
- Won Grand Jury Award at LA Outfest
- Won Audience Award - Annonay Film Festival, France
- Won BIFA for Best Newcomer - James Floyd at British Independent Film Awards
- Won Best Actor - James Floyd at Milan Film Festival
- Won New Vision Award for Cinematography - Manaki Brothers Film Festival, Macedonia
- Honorable Mention Outstanding First Feature, Frameline Film Festival
