= Gaya Jiji =

Syrian film-maker

- Born: 1979; Damascus
- Education: Paris 8 University
- Occupations: Film director, screenwriter

Gaya Jiji (born 1979) is a Syrian filmmaker working in Paris. She is the director of My Favourite Fabric (2018).

Gaya Jiji was born in 1979 in Damascus, Syria. She earned a master's degree from Paris 8 University Vincennes-Saint-Denis. She was awarded the Women in Motion Young Talent Award at the 2016 Cannes Film Festival.

Her feature film debut was My Favourite Fabric (2018), an exploration of female sexuality and self-expression set in Damascus in 2011. Manal Issa plays Nahla, who is rejected by a potential husband in favor of her sister and seeks refuge in a brothel. The film competed in the Un certain regard section of the 2018 Cannes Film Festival.

She is working on a second feature film, The Stranger.

== Filmography ==
- “The Haunted House” (15 mn, 2003)
- “The Father… too” (15 mn, 2009)
- Matin, midi, soir... et matin/“Morning, Noon, Evening… and Morning” (19 mn, 2011)
- Mon tissu préféré/My Favourite Fabric (2018)

" L'étrangère ", Pieces of a foreign life (2025)
