= Fady Elsayed =

British actor (born 1993)

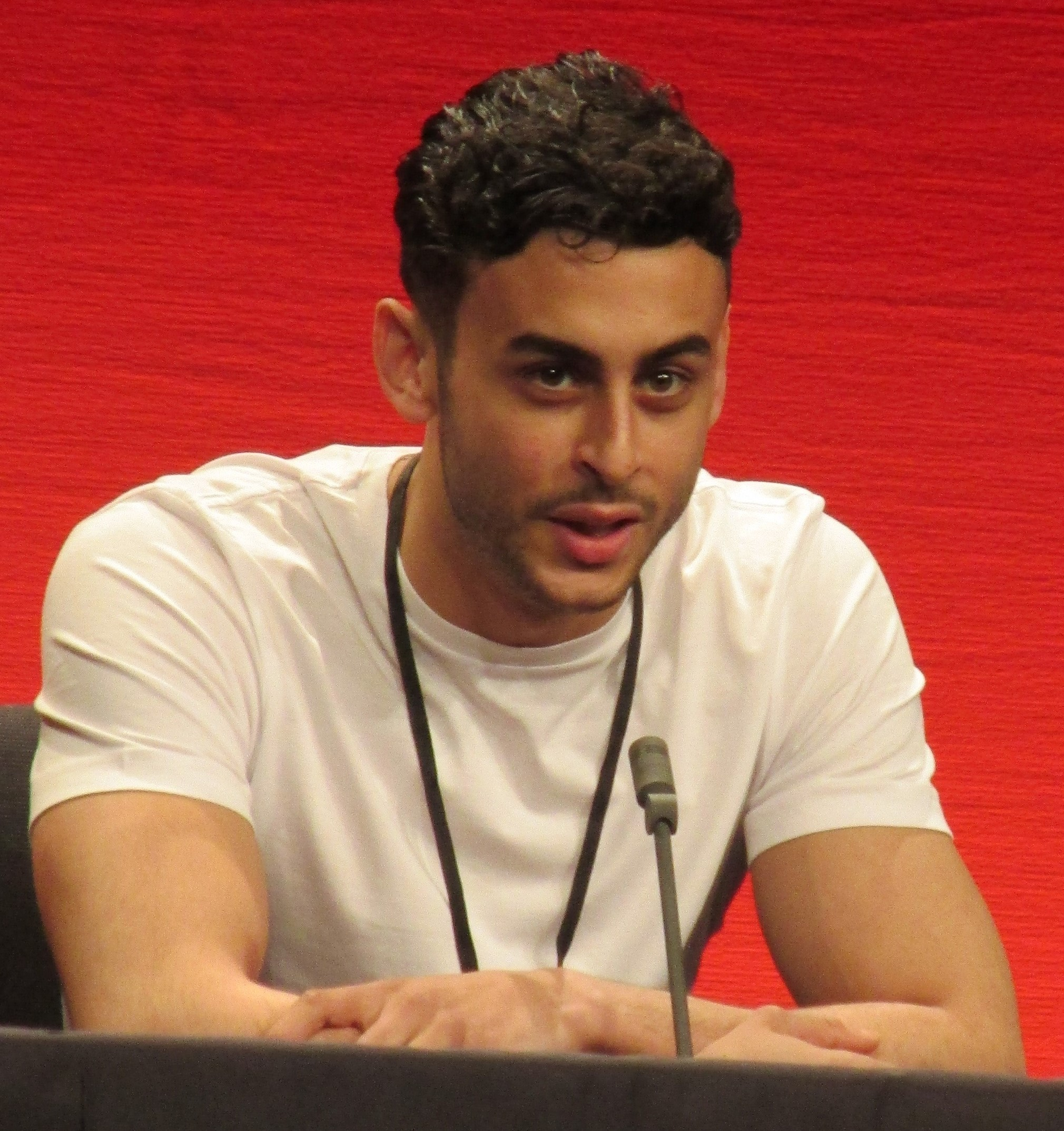
- Fady in 2017
- Born: 15 September 1993 (age 32); London, England
- Occupation: Actor
- Years active: 2012–present
- Known for: My Brother the Devil; Class; A Private War

Fady Elsayed (born 15 September 1993) is an Egyptian-British actor. He is known for his roles in the Doctor Who spin-off Class (2016) and the Sky Atlantic series Gangs of London (2022). His films include My Brother the Devil (2012) and Sixteen (2013).

== Early life ==
Elsayed was born on 15 September 1993 at St Mary's Hospital in London. At 16 years old, Elsayed joined the drama school The Young Actors Theatre in Islington.

== Career ==
=== Television and film ===
In 2012, after getting his first lead role in My Brother the Devil, Elsayed fell in love with acting and knew he wanted to be an actor for the rest of his life. For his role as Mo in My Brother the Devil he was nominated with the Best Newcomer Award at the BFI London Film Festival. He also received a nomination for the ALFS Award as Young British Performer of the Year. After this Elsayed appeared in several TV series, like Casualty and Silent Witness.

In 2014, he portrayed a vampire who spoke Arabic in Penny Dreadful.

In 2016, Elsayed was cast in the BBC Three Doctor Who spin-off Class as Ram Singh. Elsayed's character Ram is a student at Coal Hill Academy, who plays in the school's football team. In 2018 Elsayed reprised his role as Ram in six audio plays by Big Finish, and again in 2020.

In 2018, he appeared in the film A Private War alongside Rosamund Pike and Jamie Dornan.

In 2020, he appeared in several episodes of the Channel 4 drama Baghdad Central, and the Sky Atlantic drama Little Birds.

Elsayed was originally contracted to appear in the film adaptation of Black Adam, but due to the COVID-19 pandemic he was unable to travel to Atlanta for filming, and his role was recast.

In June 2021, it was announced that he would star in the second series of Gangs of London.

=== Other ===
In 2021, Elsayed featured in an advertisement campaign for PUMA's Porsche Legacy collection together with Huda El-Mufti, Tara Emad and Ahmed Beshary.

In 2023, Elsayed released his debut EP Promise Land on Bandcamp, with all proceeds going towards medical aid in Palestine.

In 2025 Sayed marks his first foray into Egyptian cinema with the series ولد بنت شايب (Walad Bint Shayeb).

== Personal life ==
Elsayed is Egyptian and Muslim. He has three brothers and one sister. He is a childhood friend of Little Simz, and has appeared in several of her music videos.

== Filmography ==
=== Film ===
Year	Title	Role	Notes
2012	My Brother the Devil	Mo	
2012	Ill Manors	Marcell's Gang	Cameo
2012	Twenty8k	Ray	
2013	Sixteen	Josh	
2016	Brotherhood	Wino	
2018	A Private War	Mourad	
2019	Daniel	George (Beatles)	
2020	Glia	Satish Jarel	
2025	Words of War	Anzor	
TBA	Footprints	Ash	In production

=== Television ===
Year	Title	Role	Notes
2012	Casualty	Zak Woodma	Episode: "Life Goes On"
2014	Silent Witness	Nuri Kavur	Recurring cast (2 episodes)
2014	Penny Dreadful	Lead Familiar	Episode: "Night Work"
2014	Law & Order: UK	Jamal	Episode: "Repeat to Fade"
2015	River	Aten Olama	Episode #1.1
2015	Citizen Khan	Tutor	Episode: "Chicken Shop"
2016	The Aliens	Henri	Episode #1.5
2016	Class	Ram Singh	Main role (7 episodes)
2020	Baghdad Central	Ibrahim Jabani	Recurring cast (4 episodes)
2020	Little Birds	Aziz	3 episodes
2022–2025	Gangs of London	Faz	Main role (seasons 2–3)
2024	Industry	Ali El Mansour	Season 3
2024	Kaos	Glaucus (son of Minos)	4 episodes
2025	Slow Horses	Kamal	Season 5
2025	ولد بنت شايب	Fady	

=== Music videos ===
Year	Title	Artist
2013	"Young and Reckless" (feat. Little Simz, Clixx, Sir Apollo & Caitlyn Scarlett)	ILLSTARZ / SEISMIC
2014	"Quest Luv"	Little Simz
2015	"Where We're Livin'"	Chuck 20
2016	"Stillness In Wonderland"	Little Simz
2018	"His & Hers (Perspectives)"	Wretch 32
2019	"Liberty Lane"	Status Quo
2021	"Introvert"	Little Simz

=== Audio ===
Year	Title	Role	Notes
2018–2020	Class	Ram Singh	7 episodes

=== Music ===
Year	Title	Type
2023	Promise Land	EP

== Awards and nominations ==
Year	Award	Category	Work	Result
2012	BFI London Film Festival	Best British Newcomer	My Brother the Devil	Nominated
2013	London Film Critics' Circle	Young British Performer of the Year	My Brother the Devil	Nominated
