= Free Souffriau =

Flemish actress and singer

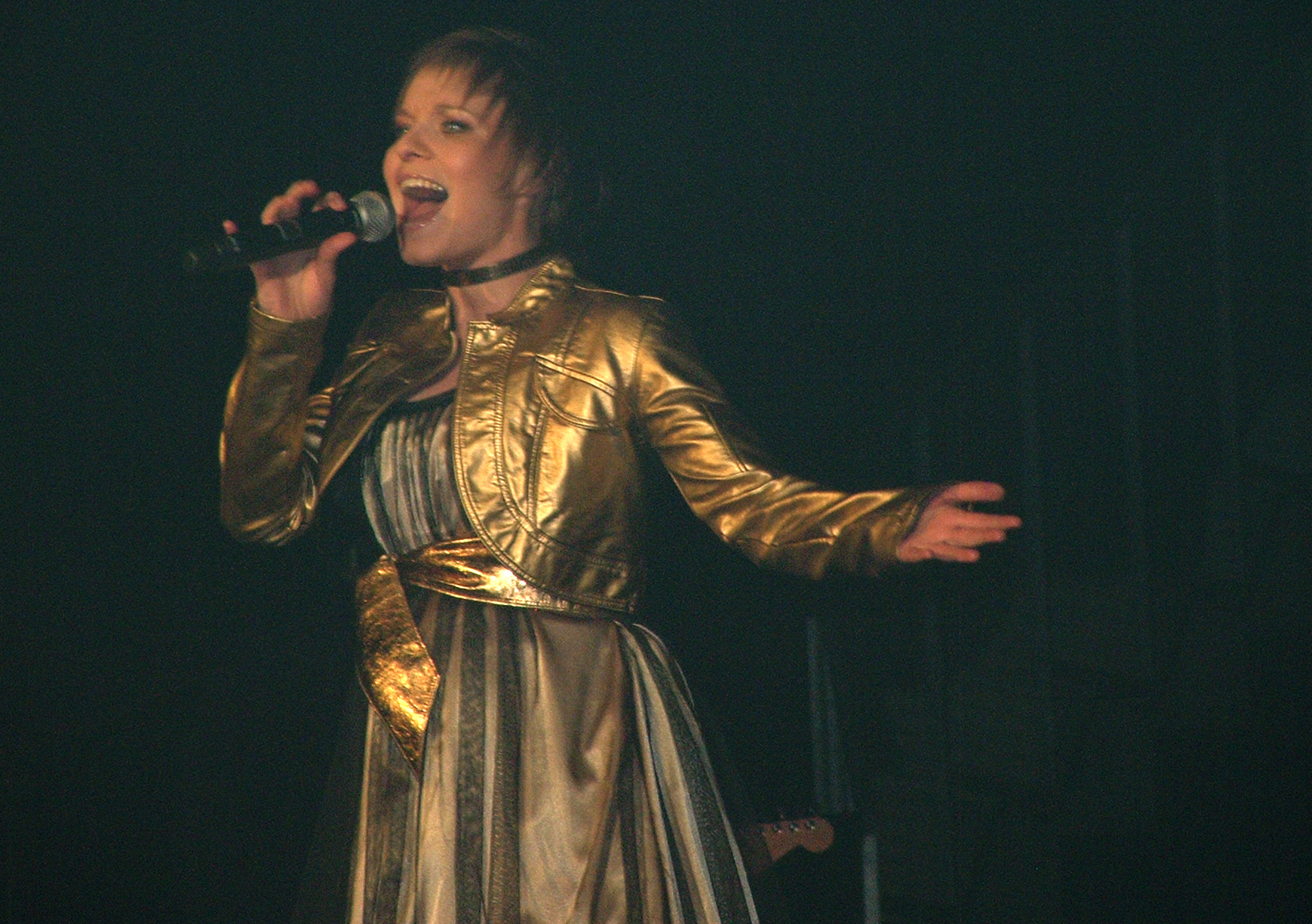
- Souffriau performing in Antwerp in 2008
- Born: Free Souffriau; 8 February 1980 (age 46); Gent, Belgium
- Occupations: actor, singer

Free Souffriau (born 8 February 1980) is a Flemish musical actress and singer. Free is a Dutch spelling of Fré (a contracted form of Fréderique) and is hence pronounced 'fray' in contrast to the usual pronunciation of 'free' in English.

After graduating from ballet school in Antwerp in 1998, she went on to perform in a variety of musicals. She is best known for her portrayal of Mega Mindy, the superhero of the eponymous television series (2006–present).

She established herself as an accomplished singer during the 2007 series of Flemish TV programme Steracteur Sterartiest, the Flemish version of Soapstar Superstar, which she won.

In 2008, her television successes were recognised when she received the Rising Star Award from the Flemish Television Academy.

In February 2010, Souffriau gave her first solo concert in a tribute performance to Belgian singer Ann Christy, widely acclaimed as one of Flanders' greatest musical talents.

== Personal life ==
Souffriau is in a relationship with musician, composer and producer Miguel Wiels. In May 2008, she gave birth to their first child Wolf.

On 23 July 2009 during a performance in Ghent, Souffriau announced that she was pregnant again and was due in January 2010.
