= Sarah Mardini =

Syrian lifeguard and human rights activist (born 1995)

- سارة مارديني
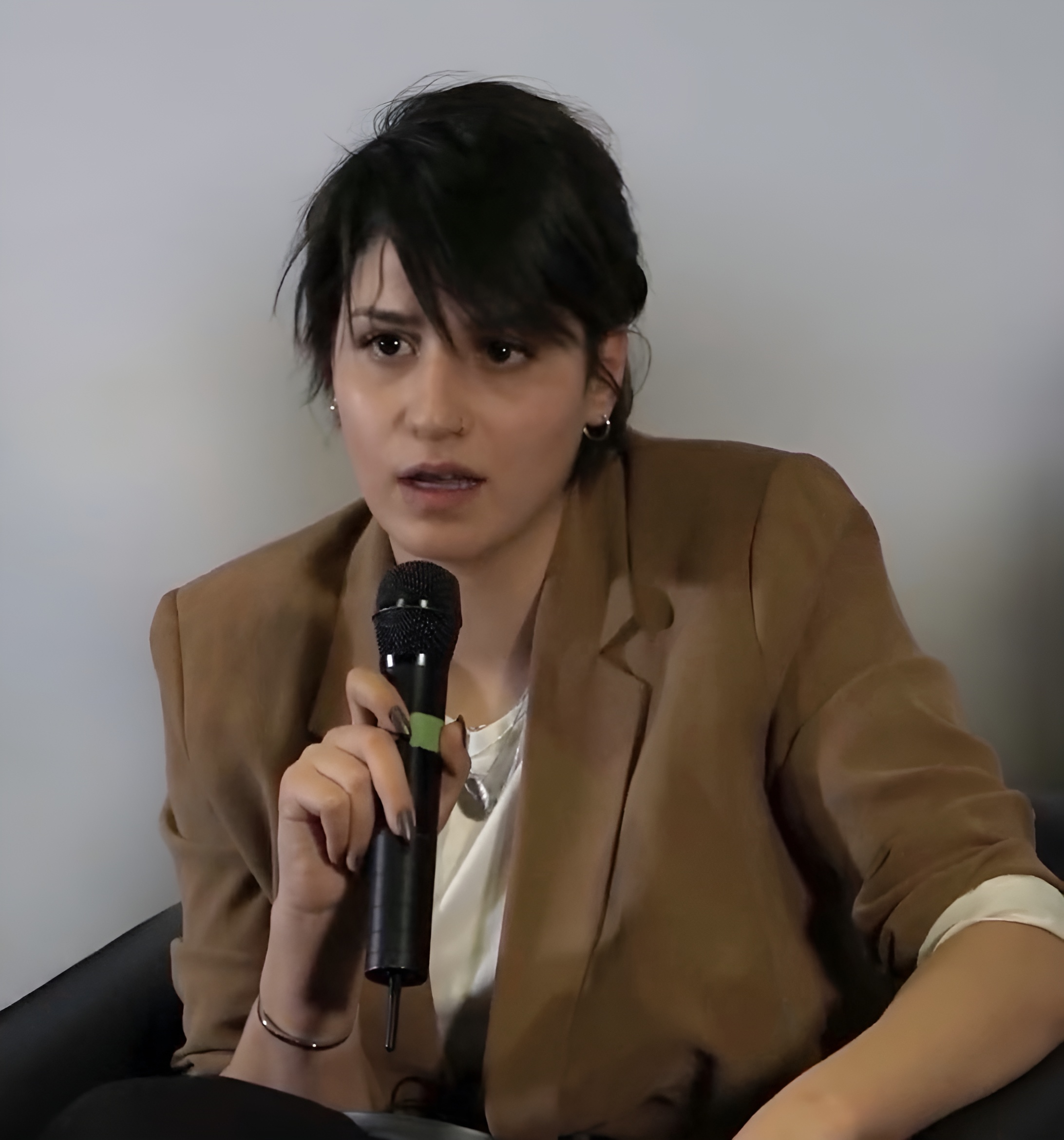
- Sarah Mardini in Berlin in 2019
- Born: Sarah Mardini; 1995 (age 30–31); Damascus, Syria
- Occupations: Lifeguard and human rights activist
- Relatives: Yusra Mardini (sister)

Sarah Mardini, alternative spelling Sara Mardini, (Arabic: سارة مارديني; born 1995) is a Syrian former competition swimmer, lifeguard and human rights activist. Fleeing her country in 2015 during the Syrian civil war with her sister, Olympic swimmer Yusra Mardini, they swam and pulled their boat, with other refugees aboard, towards the Mediterranean coast of Greece, saving themselves and the other passengers. Continuing their journey across the Balkans, they reached Berlin, Germany, the same year. She was named one of the 100 most influential people in the world by Time magazine in 2023, alongside her sister.

After the sisters had been granted political asylum in Germany, Sarah Mardini joined a non-governmental organization to help refugees on the Greek island of Lesbos. Along with human rights activist Seán Binder, she was arrested in 2018 and accused by Greek authorities of espionage, aiding illegal immigration and belonging to a criminal organization. These charges have been refuted by human rights organizations such as Amnesty International, denouncing the accusations against Mardini and other humanitarian workers and defending their actions as legal activities.

Following more than seven years of repeated legal proceedings a court on the Greek island of Lesbos ruled on 15 January 2026 that "All defendants are acquitted of the charges" because their aim was "not to commit criminal acts but to provide humanitarian aid."

== Early life and flight ==
Sarah Mardini grew up in Darayya, a suburb of Damascus, with her parents, Ezzat Mardini (also referred to as Mohamed Ezzat Mardini) and Mervat Mardini, and two younger sisters, Yusra and Shahed. As children, both Sarah and Yusra were encouraged and trained for swimming competitions by their father, a professional coach and former sports swimmer himself. Later, they joined recognized swimming teams in Syria as well as the Syrian national swimming team.

When their home was destroyed in the Syrian Civil War, Sarah and Yusra decided to flee Syria in August 2015. They reached Lebanon, and then Turkey. They arranged to be smuggled onto a Greek island by boat with 18 other migrants in a boat that was designed for no more than 6 or 7 people. After the motor stopped working and the boat began to take on water in the Aegean Sea, Yusra, Sarah, and two other people, who were able to swim, jumped into the water. They pulled the boat through the water for over three hours, until the group reached the island of Lesbos. Following this, they travelled on foot, by bus and train through Greece, the Balkans, Hungary and Austria to Germany, where they settled in Berlin in September 2015. Their parents and younger sister later also fled Syria and were granted political asylum in Germany. In 2017, Mardini became a student at Bard College Berlin after being awarded a full scholarship from the College's Program for International Education and Social Change.

== Activism for refugees and legal accusations ==
Advocating for refugees, she and her sister Yusra have spoken before the UN General Assembly in New York and for audiences in Germany, France, Belgium, the Czech Republic and Bulgaria. In autumn 2016, 21-year-old Sarah Mardini returned to Lesbos to work as a volunteer lifeguard with Emergency Response Centre International (ERCI), a Greek humanitarian NGO for refugees that cooperated with Frontex and Greek border authorities. ERCI had been operating a medical centre in Moria refugee camp, described by Human Rights Watch and other organizations as an "open air prison". Having assisted refugees as a translator in this camp for six months, Mardini said: "I talk them through it. I tell them, ‘I know what you feel, because I've been through it. I lived it, and I survived', and they feel better, because I am a refugee just like them."

Mardini was arrested at Lesbos airport on 21 August 2018, when she intended to return to Germany for the beginning of her second year at college in Berlin. On the same day, Seán Binder, a trained rescue diver and volunteer for the same NGO, went to the police station to meet with Sarah Mardini and was arrested himself. A third member of the NGO, Nassos Karakitsos, was arrested shortly afterwards.

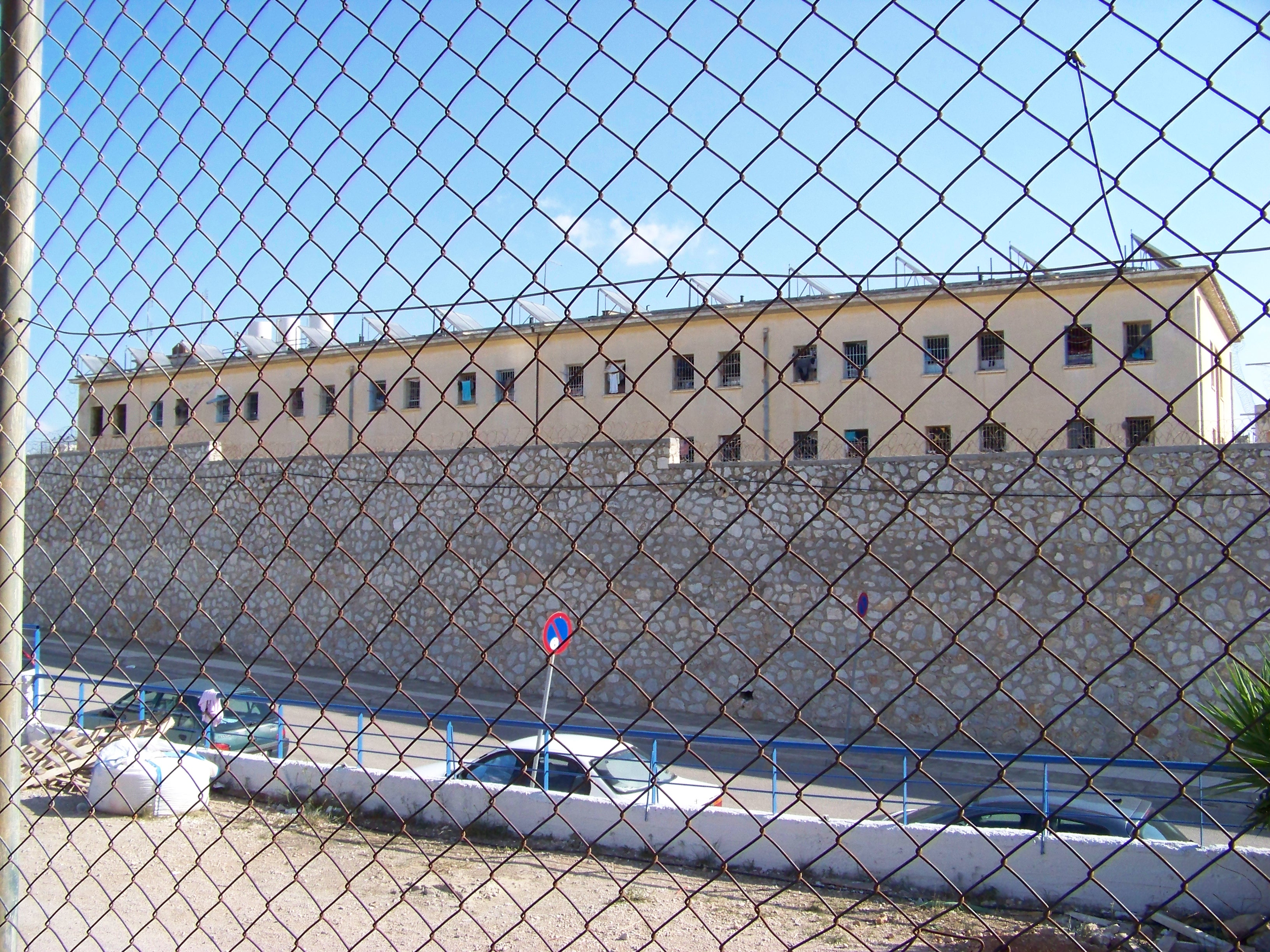
Korydallos Prison, where Mardini was held during 106 days in pre-trial detention

According to a report in The Guardian, they and two other NGO members were held in pre-trial detention for 106 days, with Mardini being incarcerated in Athens' high-security Korydallos Prison. After more than three months in prison, Binder and Mardini were released on 5,000 Euro bail and could leave Greece. Mardini, Binder and further Greek activists for refugees were accused of human trafficking, money laundering, fraud and being members of a criminal organization, by Greek authorities.

=== Court proceedings and final acquittal ===
The defendants' lawyers said the Greek authorities failed to produce concrete evidence in support of the accusations. If convicted, the accused could be sentenced to 25 years in prison. Apart from the 24 former members of ERCI, a number of other humanitarian workers have been facing prosecution in Greece, similar to what happened in Italy, where providing aid to migrants has also been criminalised.

On 18 November 2021, a court in Lesbos island adjourned the legal proceedings against the 24 members of ERCI, including Mardini and Binder, "due to lack of jurisdiction of the court" and referred the case to a higher court. On 18 November 2022, Mardini, Binder, and Greek fellow defendant Nassos Karakitsos attended their court summons at the first instance court, and declared that they had nothing to add to their earlier statements. Their trial was set to begin on 10 January 2023, facing charges classified as misdemeanour crimes, while the felony charges have not been concluded.

After more than four years of protracted legal procedures, the trial began on 10 January 2023. On 13 January, the court ruled that the charges of espionage against Mardini and the other defendants were at least partially inadmissible and rejected the case. Among other procedural objections, these were the court's initial failure to translate documents for the foreign defendants into a language they could understand as well as faulty documentation of some of the charges. However, the charges of human trafficking remained, and the defendants might have faced another trial. According to a report in the German weekly Die Zeit, the verdict was not a complete acquittal for Mardini, Binder and the other defendants, but an intermediate win, and also a political signal in a procedure that a report by the European Parliament called the 'currently largest case of criminalizing solidarity in Europe'. Reporting on the day of the trial, The Washington Post said that there probably would not be another legal indictment, as the statute of limitations expired one month later.

Following the verdict, Seán Binder commented to journalists outside the courtroom, "We want this case to be heard. We want justice. Today, there has been less injustice, but no justice." According to a report on the trial against the volunteers in the German newspaper taz of 30 January 2023, Mardini no longer gives interviews, as the years of indictment had burdened her too much.

After more than seven years of facing legal charges by Greek courts, on 15 January 2026, Mardini and 23 other defendants of the former group Emergency Response Center International were acquitted of all felony charges. “All defendants are acquitted of the charges” because their aim was “not to commit criminal acts but to provide humanitarian aid”, presiding Judge Vassilis Papathanassiou told the court. Séan Binder, her Irish-German co-defendant and Mardini were present during the acquittal, with Mardini saying “Saving human lives is not a crime.” and “We never did anything illegal because if helping people is a crime, then we are all criminals.” The lawyer of the defendants called the long duration of the indictements “unacceptable” and stated that the aim of such legal action “was to criminalise humanitarian aid and eliminate humanitarian organisations."

== Statements by international human rights organizations ==
Mary Lawlor, UN Special Rapporteur on the Situation of Human Rights Defenders, criticized the Greek authorities' refusal to allow Mardini to be present at the November 2021 court session and said "The fact that authorities have spent more than three years investigating the case has been a deterrent to civil society working for migrant rights in Greece." With regard to the accusations against Mardini and Binder, she further said: "To what have we come that we go against people who are offering solidarity? A guilty verdict for Ms. Mardini and Mr. Binder would be a dark day for Greece, and a dark day for human rights in Europe."

After the dismissal by the local court in Lesbos island on 18 November 2021, Giorgos Kosmopoulos, Senior Campaigner on Migration for Amnesty International, was quoted as follows: "These trumped-up charges are farcical and should never have resulted in Sarah and Seán appearing in court. Today's adjournment means that, having already waited over three years, this ordeal will continue to drag on for Sarah and Seán, leaving them in limbo. We call for the Greek authorities to uphold their human rights obligations, and drop the charges against Sarah and Seán." After the dismissal of the charges on 23 January, Amnesty International was quoted referring to the larger issue of criminal accusations against human rights organisations, stating "This case is a textbook example of how the criminal justice system can be misused by the authorities to punish and deter the work of human rights defenders."

== In popular culture ==
The Mardini sisters' early life and flight from Syria to Germany was described in Yusra Mardini's autobiographical book Butterfly. Further, Sarah and Yusra Mardini are the main characters of The Swimmers, a biographical film based on their story, directed by Sally El Hosaini and produced by Stephen Daldry; Sarah and Yusra are portrayed by real-life sisters Manal and Nathalie Issa. The film premiered at the Toronto International Film Festival on 8 September 2022 and released for streaming by Netflix in November 2022.

On 10 March 2023, the German section of Amnesty International announced an 89-minute documentary film about Sarah Mardini titled Sara Mardini: Gegen den Strom (Against the current). Starting on 23 March 2023, the film was shown in several German cities in the presence of Sarah Mardini, Seán Binder and director Charly Wai Feldman. Later that year, this documentary was broadcast by German public television and the German-French TV channel ARTE.

== See also ==
- 2015 European migrant crisis
- Frontex – controversies
- Refugees of the Syrian civil war
