= Michael Mulheren =

American actor

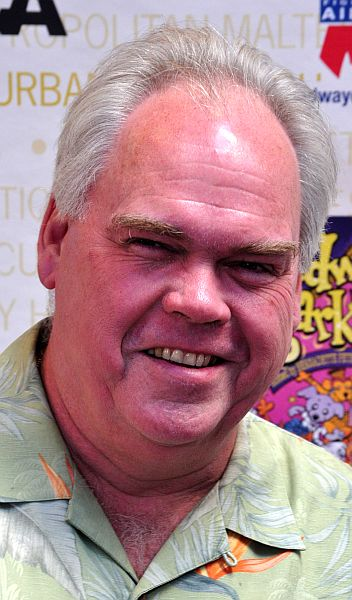
- Mulheren at the 13th Annual Broadway Barks Benefit
- Born: Middletown, New Jersey, U.S.
- Occupations: Film, television, and stage actor
- Years active: 1990–present

Michael Mulheren is an American actor from Middletown, New Jersey. He is known for his roles in Law & Order, Rescue Me, and Royal Pains.

== Career ==
=== Theatre ===
Mulheren's Broadway debut was in 1995 in On the Waterfront, after previously appearing in the off-Broadway run of The Fantasticks in the 1980s. He also appeared in the 1997 production of Broadway's Titanic. Other Broadway credits include The Boy from Oz and La Cage aux Folles; his performance in Kiss Me, Kate earned him Drama Desk and Tony Award nominations. Mulheren also appeared on Broadway in Deuce, which starred Angela Lansbury and Marian Seldes.

Mulheren appeared in the Broadway run of Aaron Sorkin's The Farnsworth Invention, as well as in Matthew Lombardo's Looped. He also appeared in the rock musical Spider-Man: Turn Off the Dark as J. Jonah Jameson. The production was directed by Julie Taymor and featured music by U2's Bono and The Edge. The show premiered in November 2010 and closed in January 2014.

Mulheren has performed in several Encores! concerts, including Li'l Abner (1998), Do Re Mi (1999), and Of Thee I Sing (2006). His most recent Encores! concert performance was in Damn Yankees in 2008 at the New York City Center. He co-starred along with Veanne Cox and Randy Graff.

Mulheren's most recent Broadway role has been in 2016 as Mayor Dobbs in Steve Martin and Edie Brickell's Bright Star.

=== Television and film ===
Mulheren has guest-starred on several TV shows including Royal Pains, White Collar, Rescue Me (playing Chief Perolli), Law & Order, 30 Rock, The West Wing, and Lipstick Jungle. He has also appeared in the films Fool’s Gold, Invincible, Bringing Out the Dead, and The Curse of the Jade Scorpion, among others.

As of 2014, he portrayed George Sibley in a recurring role on Salem.

In 2018, he had a recurring role in Daredevil as Edward Nelson, father of Foggy Nelson.

== Filmography ==
=== Film ===
| Year | Title | Role | Notes |
|---|---|---|---|
| 1991 | Johnny Suede | Fred Business | |
| 1996 | Faithful | Foreman | |
| 1997 | White Fang | Beauty Smith (voice) | Video |
| 1999 | Bringing Out the Dead | Cop in elevator | |
| 2001 | What's the Worst That Could Happen? | Judge Callahan | |
| 2001 | The Curse of the Jade Scorpion | Herb Coopersmith | |
| 2002 | Ash Wednesday | Detective Pulaski | |
| 2003 | Happy Hour | Kelly | |
| 2006 | Invincible | AC Craney | |
| 2007 | The Ten | Carvin "Big Buster" Waggle | |
| 2008 | Fool's Gold | Eddie | |
| 2021 | Rushed | Mr. Croission | |
| 2023 | Miranda's Victim | Judge McFate | |
| 2023 | Shelter in Solitude | Newscaster (voice) | |
| 2024 | Which Brings Me to You | Eddie | |

=== Television ===
| Year | Title | Role | Notes |
|---|---|---|---|
| 1990 | Wish You Were Here | Ted | Episode: "Paris" |
| 1993 | NYPD Blue | Minetta's bartender | 2 episodes |
| 1996 | As the World Turns | Nelson | 1 episode |
| 1997–2006 | Law & Order | Mike / Judge Harrison Taylor | 10 episodes |
| 1998 | Mad About You | Rude Man | Episode: "Season Opener" |
| 2000 | Third Watch | Johnson / Sergeant | 2 episodes |
| 2001 | Ed | Hal Schaefer | Episode: "Opposites Distract" |
| 2001 | Great Performances | | Episode: "My Favorite Broadway: The Love Songs" |
| 2002 | Law & Order: Criminal Intent | Agent Wallis | Episode: "The Insider" |
| 2002 | Family Law | John Montag | Episode: "Ties That Bind" |
| 2002 | The West Wing | Statehood Supporter | Episode: "Election Night" |
| 2003 | Mister Sterling | Congressman Brennan | Episode: "Game Time" |
| 2004 | Law & Order: Special Victims Unit | Judge Shawn Taylor | Episode: "Families" |
| 2004–2006 | Rescue Me | Chief Perolli | 13 episodes |
| 2005 | Law & Order: Trial by Jury | Judge Harrison Taylor | Episode: "Pattern of Conduct" |
| 2006 | Kidnapped | Jimbo | 2 episodes |
| 2008 | Lipstick Jungle | Lou Peterman | Episode: "Chapter Twelve - Scary, Scary Night!" |
| 2008 | Life on Mars | Patrolman | 2 episodes |
| 2009 | Kings | Col. Mathie Shore | Episode: "Javelin" |
| 2009 | 30 Rock | Gordan Breckman | Episode: "Audition Day" |
| 2009–2016 | Royal Pains | Jim Harper | 6 episodes |
| 2010 | White Collar | Reggie Mayfield | Episode: "Need to Know" |
| 2010 | Madso's War | Danny McGrath | TV movie |
| 2011 | Curb Your Enthusiasm | Drunk Passenger | Episode: "The Hero" |
| 2011–2012 | Person of Interest | Captain Artie Lynch | 3 episodes |
| 2012 | NYC 22 | Duty Officer Duffy | Episode: "Firebomb" |
| 2014 | Blue Bloods | Chris Scanlon | Episode: "Forgive and Forget" |
| 2014–2015 | Salem | George Sibley | 13 episodes |
| 2015 | The Jack and Triumph Show | Russ | Episode: "The Commercial" |
| 2015 | Nurse Jackie | Eddie's Deposition Lawyer | Episode: "I Say a Little Prayer" |
| 2015 | Gotham | Randall Hobbs | Episode: "Rise of the Villains: Strike Force" |
| 2015 | The Good Wife | Dr. Douglas Dooley / Bob Bondi | 2 episodes |
| 2016 | Elementary | Detective | Episode: "Worth Several Cities" |
| 2017 | Madam Secretary | Barry Milken | Episode: "Convergence" |
| 2018 | NCIS: New Orleans | Ron Cook | Episode: "A New Dawn" |
| 2018 | Daredevil | Edward Nelson | 3 episodes |
| 2019 | The Blacklist | Chief Devin Walker | Episode: "Olivia Olson (No. 115)" |
| 2019 | Instinct | Darrell Hill | Episode: "Go Figure" |
| 2020 | Evil | Father Gary Douglas | Episode: "Room 320" |
| 2020 | Hightown | Lt. Velekee | 5 episodes |
| 2020 | Social Distance | Hank | Episode: "You Gotta Ding-Dong Fling-Flong the Whole Narrative" |
| 2021 | The Bite | Judge Bar Samuels | Episode: "The Third Wave" |
| 2023 | Hello Tomorrow! | Doorman | Episode: "From the Desk of Sammy Jenkins" |
| 2024 | Fallout | Frederick Sinclair | Episode: "The Beginning" |

=== Stage ===
| Year | Title | Role | Notes |
|---|---|---|---|
| 1983–1984 | Oliver! | Long Song Seller/Ensemble | Non-Equity tour directed by Dallett Norris |
| 1995 | On the Waterfront | Truck | |
| 1997–1999 | Titanic | John B. Thayer | |
| 1999–2001 | Kiss Me, Kate | Second Man | Nominated – Drama Desk Award for Outstanding Featured Actor in a Musical; Nominated – Tony Award for Best Featured Actor in a Musical |
| 2003–2004 | The Boy from Oz | Dick Woolnough/Dee Anthony | |
| 2004–2005 | La Cage aux Folles | Edouard Dindon | |
| 2007 | Deuce | An Admirer | |
| 2007–2008 | The Farnsworth Invention | Leslie Gorrell | |
| 2010 | Looped | Steve | |
| 2011–2014 | Spider-Man: Turn Off the Dark | J. Jonah Jameson | |
| 2015–2016 | Bright Star | Mayor Dobbs | Outer Critics Circle Award |
| 2022 | Anyone Can Whistle | Police Chief Magruder | |

=== Video games ===
| Year | Title | Role |
|---|---|---|
| 2003 | Manhunt | Cerberus member |
| 2013 | Grand Theft Auto V | The Local Population |
| 2018 | Red Dead Redemption 2 | Bob Crawford Sr. |
