= Jonathan Freeman (cinematographer) =

Canadian cinematographer

- Born: Toronto, Ontario, Canada
- Education: Concordia University
- Years active: 1993–present
- Website: freemandp.com

Jonathan Freeman, ASC is a Canadian cinematographer.

He is known for his work on Game of Thrones, The Penguin, 3 Body Problem and Boardwalk Empire. Freeman's motion picture credits include Remember Me, Fifty Dead Men Walking, The Edge of Love, Hollywoodland and The Prize Winner of Defiance, Ohio.

== Early life ==
Freeman was born in Toronto. His mother was a fine art painter. As an adult, he moved to New York City.

== Career ==
Freeman was a director of photography on Game of Thrones, The Penguin, and shot multiple episodes of Boardwalk Empire. His other television credits include historical drama Rome, the Steven Spielberg-produced miniseries Taken and pilots for the long-running TV series Ray Donovan, Sons of Anarchy and Damages.

In addition to feature films and TV, Freeman also shoots commercials.

Freeman is a member of the American Society of Cinematographers (ASC).

== Filmography ==
=== Film ===
| Year | Title | Director |
|---|---|---|
| 1994 | Replikator | G. Philip Jackson |
| 1997 | 2103: The Deadly Wake | G. Philip Jackson |
| 1997 | Falling Fire | Daniel D'Or |
| 1997 | The Planet of Junior Brown | Clement Virgo |
| 1998 | The Grace of God | Gerald L'Ecuyer |
| 1999 | Resurrection | Russell Mulcahy |
| 2001 | Possible Worlds | Robert Lepage |
| 2001 | Ignition | Yves Simoneau |
| 2005 | The Prize Winner of Defiance, Ohio | Jane Anderson |
| 2006 | Hollywoodland | Allen Coulter |
| 2008 | The Edge of Love | John Maybury |
| 2008 | Fifty Dead Men Walking | Kari Skogland |
| 2009 | The Rebound | Bart Freundlich |
| 2010 | Remember Me | Allen Coulter |
| 2014 | 5 Flights Up | Richard Loncraine |

Short film

| Year | Title | Director |
|---|---|---|
| 1995 | The Home for Blind Women | Sandra Kybartas |
| 1996 | The Hangman's Bride | Naomi McCormack |

=== Television ===
| Year | Title | Director | Notes |
|---|---|---|---|
| 1997 | Prince Street | Matthew Penn | Episode "God Bless America" |
| 1998-2000 | Three | | |
| 2002 | Street Time | Marc Levin | Episode "Pilot" (Part 1 & 2) |
| 2004 | The Jury | Barry Levinson | Episode "Pilot" |
| 2004 | Rescue Me | Peter Tolan; John Fortenberry | Episodes "Guts", "Gay" and "Kansas" |
| 2007 | Rome | Alik Sakharov; John Maybury; Steve Shill | 3 episodes |
| 2007 | Damages | Allen Coulter | Episode "Get Me a Lawyer" |
| 2008 | Sons of Anarchy | Allen Coulter; Michael Dinner | Episode "Pilot" |
| 2010 | Rubicon | Allen Coulter | Episode "Gone in the Teeth" |
| 2010–2014 | Boardwalk Empire | | 12 episodes |
| 2012–2019 | Game of Thrones | Alan Taylor; Daniel Minahan; D. B. Weiss; Jack Bender; David Benioff | 9 episodes |
| 2013 | Ray Donovan | | Episode: "The Bag or the Bat" |
| 2016 | Roadside Picnic | Alan Taylor | Unsold pilot |
| 2024 | 3 Body Problem | Derek Tsang | Episodes "Countdown" and "Red Coast" |
| 2025 | Fallout | Frederick E. O. Toye | Episodes "The Innovator" and "The Golden Rule" |

Miniseries

| Year | Title | Director | Notes |
|---|---|---|---|
| 2002 | Taken | | 6 episodes |
| 2020 | Defending Jacob | Morten Tyldum | |
| 2024 | The Penguin | Helen Shaver | Episodes "Cent'Anni" and "Homecoming" |

TV movies

| Year | Title | Director |
|---|---|---|
| 1993 | Manic | Alex Chapple |
| 1996 | Carver's Gate | Sheldon Inkol |
| 1997 | Promise the Moon | Ken Jubenville |
| 1998 | Futuresport | Ernest Dickerson |
| 1998 | Beauty | Jerry London |
| 1998 | Catch Me If You Can | Jeffrey Reiner |
| 1999 | Strange Justice | Ernest Dickerson |
| 2000 | The Courage to Love | Kari Skogland |
| 2001 | Semper Fi | Michael W. Watkins |
| 2001 | Hitched | Wesley Strick |
| 2001 | The Lost Battalion | Russell Mulcahy |
| 2002 | Monday Night Mayhem | Ernest Dickerson |
| 2003 | Good Fences | Ernest Dickerson |
| 2004 | Homeland Security | Daniel Sackheim |
| 2004 | Hollywood Division | James Foley |

== Awards and nominations ==
American Society of Cinematographers

| Year | Category | Title | Episode(s) | Result |
|---|---|---|---|---|
| 1997 | Outstanding Cinematography in Regular Series | Prince Street | "God Bless America" | Won |
| 1999 | Outstanding Cinematography in Motion Picture, Limited Series, or Pilot Made for Television | Strange Justice | —N/a | Nominated |
| 2002 | Outstanding Cinematography in Motion Picture, Limited Series, or Pilot Made for Television | Taken | "John" | Nominated |
| 2004 | Outstanding Cinematography in Motion Picture, Limited Series, or Pilot Made for Television | Homeland Security | —N/a | Won |
| 2010–2014 | Outstanding Cinematography in Regular Series | Boardwalk Empire | "Golden Days for Boys and Girls" "Home" "21" | Won |
| 2012–2019 | Outstanding Cinematography in Regular Series | Game of Thrones | "Valar Dohaeris" | Won |
| 2024 | Outstanding Cinematography in Motion Picture, Limited Series, or Pilot Made for Television | The Penguin | —N/a | Nominated |

Primetime Emmy Awards

| Year | Award | Title | Episode(s) | Result |
|---|---|---|---|---|
| 2010–2014 | Outstanding Cinematography for a Single-Camera Series | Boardwalk Empire | "Golden Days for Boys and Girls" "Home" "21" | Won |
| 2012–2019 | Outstanding Cinematography for a Single-Camera Series | Game of Thrones | "Two Swords" "The Iron Throne" | Nominated |
| 2020 | Outstanding Cinematography for a Limited Series or Movie | Defending Jacob | "After" | Nominated |

Other awards

| Year | Title | Award/Nomination |
|---|---|---|
| 2001 | Possible Worlds | Nominated—Genie Award for Best Achievement in Cinematography; Nominated—Jutra Award for Best Cinematography |
| 2006 | Hollywoodland | Nominated—St. Louis Film Critics Award for Best Cinematography |
| 2008 | Fifty Dead Men Walking | Nominated—Genie Award for Best Achievement in Cinematography |
