= The Innovator =

- Fallout episode
- Episode no.: Season 2 Episode 1
- Directed by: Frederick E. O. Toye
- Written by: Geneva Robertson-Dworet; Graham Wagner
- Cinematography by: Jonathan Freeman
- Editing by: Ali Comperchio
- Original air date: December 16, 2025
- Running time: 62 minutes

Guest appearances
- Sarita Choudhury as Kate Williams / Lee Moldaver; Leslie Uggams as Betty Pearson; Annabel O'Hagan as Stephanie Harper; Dave Register as Chet; Rodrigo Luzzi as Reg McPhee; Michael Esper as Bud Askins / Brain-on-a-Roomba; Rafi Silver as Robert House; Susan Berger as Old Woman Gretch; Jared Bankens as Nick the Prick; Christopher Matthew Cook as Bill; Justin Theroux as Robert House

Episode chronology
← Previous "The Beginning"	Next → "The Golden Rule"
- Fallout season 2

"The Innovator" is the first episode of the second season of the American post-apocalyptic drama television series Fallout. It is the ninth overall episode of the series and was written by series developers Geneva Robertson-Dworet and Graham Wagner, and directed by executive producer Frederick E. O. Toye. It was released on Amazon Prime Video on December 16, 2025.

The series depicts the aftermath of an apocalyptic nuclear exchange in an alternate history of Earth where advances in nuclear technology after World War II led to the emergence of a retrofuturistic society and a subsequent resource war. The survivors took refuge in fallout shelters known as Vaults, built to preserve humanity in the event of nuclear annihilation. In the episode, Lucy and the Ghoul try to reach New Vegas, while the Vault residents face a crisis due to the limited amount of resources.

The episode received mostly positive reviews from critics, who praised its production values, character development and performances.

== Plot ==
In 2077, public turmoil erupts against automation and RobCo Industries. At a bar, a mysterious man (Note: Identified in later episodes as Robert House) supportive of RobCo is confronted by some of the patrons. He takes them out back and shows them millions of dollars in his car, offering it in exchange for installing a chip in their necks. When one of the patrons threatens him instead, he forcefully installs the chip, controlling him into killing his friends. After the man completes the task, he seemingly breaks free of the control, before the mysterious man causes his head to explode.

After learning of Vault-Tec's plans, Cooper Howard tries to flee with his daughter, Janey, but Lee Moldaver (Note: Known as Kate Williams at the time) convinces him to remain and spy on his wife, Barb, as she travels to Las Vegas to meet Mr. House.

In 2296, Lucy MacLean and the Ghoul kill a group of Great Khans in Novac while tracking Lucy's father, Hank. They follow his tracks into the abandoned Vault 24, where they discover a Vault-Tec experiment that attempted to brainwash Americans into becoming communists through the use of the implanted chips. The only living person in the vault creepily tells Lucy to go home before his head explodes due to the chip.

At Vault 31, Norm, left without food or water, is offered the choice between a quick death or to freeze in his father's cryopod, but instead chooses to awaken all of the remaining cryogenically preserved Vault-Tec junior executives. In Vault 32, Overseer Steph struggles in her new role whilst forcing Chet to continue looking after her baby; in Vault 33, Overseer Betty oversees repairs to the water chip and encourages Reg, whom she sees as useless, to form a new club.

Hank arrives at New Vegas, making his way to an abandoned Vault-Tec facility. He listens to his unanswered messages, and issues a message to an unidentified person. He confirms his safety, and promises to finish his project, hoping to finally receive a promotion.

== Production ==
=== Development ===
The episode was written by series developers Geneva Robertson-Dworet and Graham Wagner, and directed by executive producer Frederick E. O. Toye. It marked Robertson-Dworet's fourth writing credit, Wagner's fourth writing credit, and Toye's third directing credit.

=== Writing ===
Regarding the new dynamic relationship between Lucy and the Ghoul, Ella Purnell said "they're this very unlikely duo on this road trip together. They both want to be seen. They both want to be heard. They both can't stand the other and want the other person to see things their way and do what they want to do and be in the right." She further added, "all the experiences that the Wasteland throws at them is actually the thing that helps their relationship improve and move along. It's certainly not a linear journey, but I would say they may start to find some common ground at some point."

Moises Arias commented on Norm's decision in the episode, "I think he balances leadership and deceptiveness quite well as he goes. That's the only way he's going to convince these ‘super managers’ that he is the hyper, super biological species of a manager that they are all waiting for. Of course, none of that is true. He's learning on the fly how to lead but at the same time how to balance power."

=== Music ===
The episode features many songs, including "Cheek to Cheek" by Peggy Lee, "Big Iron" by Marty Robbins, "Make the World Go Away" by Eddy Arnold, "It's All Over But the Crying" by The Ink Spots, and "Working for the Man" by Roy Orbison.

== Critical reception ==
"The Innovator" received mostly positive reviews from critics. Matt Purslow of IGN gave the episode a "good" 7 out 10 rating and wrote in his verdict, "The first episode of Fallout's second season promises that a great, twisty journey lies ahead, headlined by the ever-fantastic Ella Purnell and Walton Goggins, and lent some extra grease by the suave-yet-slimy Robert House, given brilliant new life by Justin Theroux. But while the gears are aligned by the time credits roll, the genuine excitement hasn't quite started yet. Much of the opening half-hour feels like flicking through your quest log and rifling through your inventory to remind yourself of where you were, and the seemingly inconsequential vault-based storylines threaten to get lost among better ideas. But even with those problems, this is a good hour of television that signals even better things to come."

William Hughes of The A.V. Club gave the episode a "B–" grade and wrote, "This is a pretty good collection of scenes, all told, and my grade for the episode reflects that overall quality. As a single episode of TV, though, it's hard to perceive it as much of anything at all."

Jack King of Vulture gave the episode a 4 star rating out of 5 and wrote, "It clearly calls into question where Hank's loyalty actually lies; is he really the Vault-Tec company man that we'd been led to believe? Whatever the case, he might be a little late for that promotion." Sean T. Collins of Decider wrote, "For now, Fallout is back in all its gory glory, its message timelier than ever."

Erik Kain of Forbes wrote, "All told, I thought this was a great season premiere. Lots of funny bits, some great, gory action. A lot of care has gone into the details, from Cooper's kitchen to the Khans' wasteland hideout. And the casting is so spot-on. Ella Purnell, Walton Goggins, Justin Theroux, Kyle MacLachlan, all the supporting cast. Just top-notch." Ross Bonaime of Collider gave the episode a 8 out of 10 and wrote, ""The Innovator" does a great job of getting viewers pumped for Vegas, while also presenting both Theroux and MacLachlan as terrifying new threats to brace for. The implications of what RobCo and Vault-Tec are capable of have only become more haunting, and this is an excellent reminder of what these characters have already been through as well as what they still have to contend with. War never changes, but who's in control of it certainly seems to be in question."

Alexandria Ingham of TV Fanatic gave the episode a 4.5 star rating out of 5 and wrote, "Fallout Season 2 Episode 1 gives us just a hint of the message behind House and Hank’s actions, a look at what uncontrolled power and knowledge can do, and I’m here for it." Greg Wheeler of The Review Geek gave the episode a 3.5 star rating out of 5 and wrote, "There are a lot of individual plot threads and lots of different characters to juggle. I mean, we haven't even seen Maximus yet so it remains to be seen right now how Fallout is going to handle all of this. For the time being though, Fallout delivers a very enjoyable episode all the same."
