= Detained (Class) =

06 – "Detained"
- Class episode
- Trapped in a strange dimension, the students discover the meteor.

Cast
- Starring: Greg Austin – Charlie; Fady Elsayed – Ram; Sophie Hopkins – April; Vivian Oparah – Tanya; Katherine Kelly – Miss Quill
- Others: Jordan Renzo – Matteusz; Ferdy Roberts - Prisoner (voice)

Production
- Directed by: Wayne Yip
- Written by: Patrick Ness
- Produced by: Derek Ritchie
- Executive producers: Patrick Ness; Steven Moffat; Brian Minchin
- Music by: Blair Mowat
- Series: Series 1
- Running time: 45 minutes
- First broadcast: 19 November 2016

Chronology
← Preceded by "Brave-ish Heart"	Followed by → "The Metaphysical Engine, or What Quill Did"

"Detained" is the sixth episode of the British science fiction television series Class. It was released online by BBC Three on 19 November 2016. The episode was written by the series' creator Patrick Ness and directed by Wayne Che Yip.

Class follows four students of Coal Hill Academy and their alien teacher, as they deal with various alien threats. In the episode, which was described as an example of bottle episode, Miss Quill (Katherine Kelly) leaves the other characters in detention while she attends urgent matters. Things take an unexpected turn when a meteor flies through a tear in space and time right into the detention room, sending it and its occupants outside of time and space. To find a way out before it is too late, the students must interact with the meteor; however doing so also forces them to admit secret truths to their classmates, which is not without consequences.

The following episode, "The Metaphysical Engine, or What Quill Did", takes place concurrently with "Detained" and follows Miss Quill instead of the students.

The episode was acclaimed by critics for its writing, directing, and performances; several critics called it the best episode of the series.

== Plot ==
The episode opens with Miss Quill, accompanying Charlie to detention for being a few minutes late to a class earlier that day. As he protests, Quill reminds him that although he forced her into slavery and refuses to avenge the genocides of their species using the Cabinet of Souls, she as a teacher has the authority to put him in detention. When they arrive, Charlie realizes that all the other students tasked by the Doctor to protect the school were also placed in detention by Quill; before he can react, Quill locks the door, hinting that she has other matters to attend and want to keep them out of her way. As Charlie starts getting panicked due to his claustrophobia, April, who has another key, opens the door for him; as she does, a meteor flies through a nearby tear in space and time right into the detention room, causing a small explosion. The students are unharmed, but realize that now, the room simply seems to be floating in black nothingness.

The students start by wondering what happened to them. After ruling out that it was a part of Miss Quill's plan and deciding that they are not in space, they come to the conclusion that something came out of a crack in space and time. They quickly find the meteor and understand that it is responsible for their situation. Things start to get out of control as they fear that the meteor might causes radiation, and Matteusz, deciding to act, grabs the meteor to throw it by the door. However, before he can do it, he is hit by the strange effects of the stone: without any apparent reason, he starts telling events of back when he lived in Poland and came out to his grandmother, before suddenly telling his boyfriend Charlie that he despite loving him, he is also afraid of him because Charlie is not human. He refuses to let go of the stone, until April knocks it away from him.

Being back to normal, Matteusz explains that he does not know why he said those things, but that they were all true. He insists that it was only a part of the truth, but Charlie is hurt nonetheless. While they continue to try finding out a solution, everyone keeps being strangely angry, even as they realize it and find no apparent reason. This leads Tanya to the conclusion that the stone is of alien origin, forces whoever holds it to tell the truth, and is also making them progressively angrier. Finally, she makes the assumption that the stone may somehow communicate via the person holding it, and grabs it herself. Like Matteusz, she tells her story about her past life relating to her having to admit the truth. Then, forced to honesty by the stone, she states than none of the other students are actually her friends, and that they all look down on her because she is younger. However, having concluded that as she cannot tell lies, she might answer to questions regarding the meteor, she makes the others question her about their situation: the trick works, and she reveals that the stone "fries your brain" if one holds it too long, and that it is sentient, wants to use them, and is "a prisoner". Ram then knocks the stone away from her before it is too late.

Charlie tries to see if they can escape through the nothingness, but finds out that it is a mirror portal that immediately brings anything back inside. Having concluded that they now share the meteor's prison, the students decide that they must use the stone again to find how to get out. However, they also conclude that only those who did not use the stone yet can do it, as the ones who already did might die should they try again. Ram volunteers and grabs the meteor: he is forced to confess to April that he is in love with her, but is able to reveal that the prisoner is a male and a murderer who took many lives, but also that as a part of his punishment, he is forced to always say the truth, explaining the stone's effects on them. Ram also felt like the prisoner was somehow gaining strength from their confessions and wants to kill them.

The students are fighting more and more, due to the influence of the stone but also to all they truly feel after the last revelations. Forced to act faster as Charlie starts having panic attacks due to his claustrophobia, April grabs the meteor, who has gotten more powerful: she is able to reveal that they were taken out of space and time, meaning they will not age or die, but will stay trapped here forever. However, for those reveals she also had to admit to Ram that she does not love him. Without having to hold the stone, Charlie reveals his feelings to the others. He tells them that he deeply desires to murder the entire Shadow Kin using the Cabinet of Souls, in revenge for them slaughtering his entire race, even if it means losing everything he cares for. He also admits that sometimes he hates Matteusz for being the main reason why he doesn't do it, and that none of the other students really know him. He finally grabs the meteor, thinking he has nothing left to confess, before realizing and admitting that he knows he will eventually lose Matteusz.

As Charlie had confessed every secret he had and proved he was more guilty in his heart that the prisoner himself, the stone breaks and the classroom and students are teleported back into their normal place in space and time. However, the prison meteor, recognizing Charlie as a guilty criminal (because that is what he feels in his heart), attempts to trap him inside of the stone forever alongside the prisoner; he is saved by a returning Miss Quill, who shoots the meteor and destroys it. As the other students leave the classroom deeply angry at each other after all those revelations, Charlie, asks a transformed Quill, now with a scar on her left eye and inexplicably longer hair than 45 minutes ago, how she is now able to use a gun. She reveals that the creature he put in her mind to enslave her and stop her from running wild has been removed, and that she now has her freedom of action back; she states that things are going to change.

=== Outside references ===
- Trying to justify his words to Charlie, Matteusz mentions The Chronicles of Narnia and something similar that happens to the character of Susan. Charlie, unaware that it is a work of fiction, asks if Narnia is in Canada.

== Production ==
The episode was directed by Wayne Che Yip, who also directed the following episode, "The Metaphysical Engine, or What Quill Did". It was premiered on 19 November 2016 at 10am. The episode was broadcast in the United States in early 2017 on BBC America.

"Detained" features several close-up shots (here, Jordan Renzo as Matteusz) with highlights of light across the characters' eyes; several critics saw it as a homage to Star Trek, another science fiction series with notable bottle episodes.

== Reception ==
The episode was acclaimed by critics, and was called the best in the series by some. The conflicts between the characters and reveals of their true feelings were praised, together with the episode's writing, directing, and performances, notably Greg Austin and Jordan Renzo as Charlie and Matteusz respectively.

Alex Moreland of Flickering Myth widely acclaimed the episode, giving it a perfect rating of 10, highly praising its writing, performances, and directing, and considering it the best episode of the season. He called it "the best episode of Class yet – possibly the closest it’s come to a genuinely resounding classic that could stand alongside the best of Doctor Who". He also stated "The central conceit of the episode is able to transcend its apparent artifice, instead providing the impetus for some powerful character drama. It’s often moving, consistently nuanced, and regularly insightful; Ness has a real ability to get to the heart of his characters, and ‘Detained’ is the best example of this. There’s a real energy to this episode – it’s a tense, moody piece of drama, quite unlike anything the show has given us so far. And yet, in many ways, one can’t help but feel that Class would have been significantly diminished, to the point of being incomplete, without this episode".

Dave Golder of Mym Buzz gave the episode four out of five stars, calling it "as pure an example of a bottle episode as you could imagine. No guest stars. One set (two if you include the corridor outside the classroom). And lots and lots and lots of jaw jaw about –ugh – emotions. And it’s also brilliant". He also praised the "clever scripting" and "very stylish direction" for making the episode visually appealing, and the performances (Greg Austin's in particular), and stated "There’s great acting throughout and some marvellously awkward moments as the 'truths' are revealed. A couple of the speeches (Tanya’s 'typical white people' strop especially) come across a little clunky but the sentiments behind them feel genuine. And that feeling of 'not connecting' is a theme that’ll ring true to anyone who’s even been a teenager that’s ripped right open and left raw and bleeding here."

Vodzilla gave the episode a 9 out of 10, highly praising its inventivity and performances, and stating "'Detained' is Class at its best, plunging the group into a situation where the intensity of their relationships with one another works hand-in-hand with the relatively short time they’ve known each other to wreak emotional havoc. The students all know themselves and each other far better at the end of the episode than they did at the start and, unlike a grateful audience, they might not be glad of what they find out".

"The biggest shock of the episode is how they don’t all shake hands and make up at the end of the episode. That’s the standard trope: they may have been at each others’ throats for 45 minutes but they’ve all reached a better understanding. Not here. Everybody exits stage left pursued by a grudge. And that makes the episode even more powerful."

— Dave Golder for Mym Buzz

Cult Box gave the episode a perfect rating of five, stating "Director Wayne Yip (Utopia, Misfits) effectively sold their confinement, the escalating levels of mistrust and the sense that they were not alone with some terrific close-up camera work, and a filtered pov during the moments of possession".

Den of Geek highly praised the episode for its character development, performances, stating "Class cares. It doesn’t patronise or mock its characters for what they’re going through. It cares about them, and it shows them caring about each other. We can’t overstate the good that does". Fortress of Solitude highly praised the cast, stating that "the performers handles their role superbly, with each of them having a moment to shine", and the conflicts between the characters.

Several critics favourably compared "Detained" to the Doctor Who episode "Midnight", which also featured a group of characters trapped in a single room.
