= The Beginning (Fallout) =

- Fallout episode
- Episode no.: Season 1 Episode 8
- Directed by: Wayne Yip
- Written by: Gursimran Sandhu
- Cinematography by: Dan Stoloff
- Editing by: Daniel Raj Koobir; Ali Comperchio
- Original air date: April 10, 2024
- Running time: 61 minutes

Guest appearances
- Sarita Choudhury as Lee Moldaver; Frances Turner as Barb Howard; Michael Esper as Bud Askins / Brain-on-a-Roomba; Michael Cristofer as Elder Cleric Quintus; Michael Mulheren as Frederick Sinclair; Rafi Silver as Robert House; James Yaegashi as Leon Von Felden; Rebecca Watson as Julia Masters

Episode chronology
← Previous "The Radio"	Next → "The Innovator"
- Fallout season 1

"The Beginning" is the eighth and final episode of the first season of the American post-apocalyptic drama television series Fallout. The episode was written by producer Gursimran Sandhu and directed by Wayne Yip. It was released on Amazon Prime Video on April 10, 2024, alongside the rest of the season.

The series depicts the aftermath of an apocalyptic nuclear exchange in an alternate history of Earth where advances in nuclear technology after World War II led to the emergence of a retrofuturistic society and a subsequent resource war. The survivors took refuge in fallout shelters known as Vaults, built to preserve humanity in the event of nuclear annihilation. In the episode, Lucy reunites with Hank, while Maximus sets out to find Moldaver.

The episode received positive reviews from critics, who praised its resolution, writing and performances.

== Plot ==
The Brotherhood picks up Maximus and takes him to the base. Unsatisfied, as he didn't deliver Wilzig's head, the Elder accuses him of injuring aspirant Dane, until Dane confesses that they injured themself out of fear of anointment. The Brotherhood command Maximus lead them to Moldaver or face the consequences for his actions. Meanwhile, Lucy reaches Griffith Observatory, finding a small settlement flying the New California Republic (NCR) flag. She enters Moldaver's base at the top of the observatory, finding Lucy's father Hank locked in a cage and a feral ghoul sitting at a table with Moldaver.

In Vault 31, Norm finds a hall of cryogenic pods containing Vault-Tec executives, with reserve listings that include Betty, Hank, and Steph. The Brain-On-A-Roomba, revealed to be Vault-Tec executive Bud Askins, reveals that these executives were to be released over time as Overseers for Vaults 32 and 33. To keep this secret from being revealed, Bud locks the door and leaves Norm the choice of either entering one of the pods or starving to death.

A flashback shows Cooper deciding to listen in on his wife Barb via the bug in her Pip-Boy. He enters her office to avoid interference, and agrees to meet her assistant, who is a fan of his. In a meeting with Vault-Tec investors Leon Von Feldon of West-Tek, Julia Masters of REPCONN, Robert House of RobCo, and Frederick Sinclair of Big MT, Barb and Bud propose to sell many of their Vaults to be used in various experiments, with three interconnected Vaults (31–33) being reserved for their own experiment. Barb assures the investors that the Vaults will be put to use by planning to drop the first nuclear bomb themselves. The investors, save for Mr. House, discuss torture ideas for vault experiments, all of which are direct references to vaults that can be found in the various Fallout games. As a shocked Cooper listens, Barb's assistant, who is revealed to be Hank, is brought in.

Back in the present, Moldaver reveals that Hank's wife Rose discovered something siphoning Vault 32's water, and concluded that civilization had returned to the surface. Hank dismissed the idea, leading Rose to discover he was hiding something and escape the Vault with their small children Lucy and Norman. On the surface, they reached Shady Sands and befriended Moldaver. Hank tracked them down and destroyed the city with a nuclear device, but Rose survived as a feral ghoul, being the one sitting at the table next to Moldaver. The latter reveals that Wilzig's head contains "Cold Fusion," an infinite power source that requires a code to be used, which only Vault-Tec representatives know. Lucy urges her father to input the code, and he finally does.

As the cold fusion reactor initiates, the Brotherhood arrives to capture Wilzig's head, fighting their way through the settlement into the observatory and killing most of the NCR defenders as well as many civilians. The Ghoul arrives and fights the Brotherhood, exploiting a weakness in their power armor using special ammunition to ambush and kill multiple Knights. Maximus seizes the opportunity to reach Lucy and release Hank. However, Hank steals a fallen Knight's power armor, knocks Maximus out when the latter learns that Hank was responsible for the destruction of Shady Sands, and tells Lucy to accompany him. Lucy refuses, and, when confronted by the Ghoul about his family, Hank flees. Hoping to find answers, the Ghoul invites Lucy to join him. She accepts and kills Rose to end her suffering. After they depart, Maximus awakens and witnesses a mortally wounded Moldaver activating the reactor, returning electricity to Los Angeles. She asks Maximus what the Brotherhood would do with such power before succumbing to her wounds just as more Brotherhood soldiers arrive. Believing that Maximus killed Moldaver, the soldiers commend him for his supposed act, and proclaim him a Knight.

Later, the Ghoul, Lucy, and CX-404 leave Hollywood in pursuit of Hank. Hank treks across the desert and arrives in the Mojave Wasteland, discovering the city of New Vegas.

== Production ==
=== Writing ===
On Lucy's decision to leave with Howard, Geneva Robertson-Dworet explained, "The Ghoul seems to know a hell of a lot more about this world than she does. There's a certain amount of 'I want to understand, I want to leave the cave again.' In a way, it's a mirror image to the pilot."

Goggins was not familiar with the phrase "War never changes" taken from the video game franchise. Despite that, he was glad to not know it beforehand, as "I would have been so intimidated by it." The showrunners wanted to avoid telling the stars about references to the game, as they felt this would distract them. Wagner said, "we really did want to express it through Barb's point of view first, and then see the A-side and the B-side of it, and the gap between the two."

=== Filming ===
Originally, the scene where Lucy kills Rose involved Purnell crying. But the team felt that it wasn't genuine, with Purnell saying "if she's gonna get up and go into the wasteland, she needs to be a changed woman, and maybe her grief needs to give way to something harder." This led to the scene being reshot.

=== Music ===
The score was composed by Ramin Djawadi. The episode features many songs, including "I Don't Want to See Tomorrow" by Nat King Cole, and "We Three (My Echo, My Shadow and Me)" by The Ink Spots.

== Release ==
The episode, along with the rest of the season, premiered on April 10, 2024, on Amazon Prime Video. Originally, the season was scheduled to premiere on April 12, 2024.

== Critical reception ==
"The Beginning" received positive reviews from critics. William Hughes of The A.V. Club gave the episode an "A–" grade and wrote, "Like the games it pulls from, it has big, weird ideas about humanity, hope, and humor, and it expresses them through a point of view like pretty much nothing much else on TV, ragingly cynical in a way that never quite curdles into despair. It's not only a good adaptation, but a great story in its own right — and it's all enough to make us sincerely hope this world won't be ending any time soon."

Jack King of Vulture gave the episode a 4 star rating out of 5 and wrote, "This is Fallout's most poignant episode, as tragedies in the present collide with greater tragedies of the past, personal, and civilizational. It's about a man who became a monster, haunted for 200 years by a betrayal that, quite literally, ripped the world apart; it's about a father who committed a monstrous act for what he thought was the greater good; it's about a daughter whose entire world view is shattered by revelations too painful to countenance. It's about the cycles of violence and conflict we are doomed to repeat by human greed."

Sean T. Collins of Decider wrote, "Making no effort, and showing no desire, to conceal its roots in an entertainment-first art form, Fallout is that rarest of beasts: a post-apocalyptic romp with a sense of humor too black to be cute about it. In the process provides a real star turn for Ella Purnell in particular, the one lead whose face is on display for all to read at all times and who thus has to carry so much weight on her shoulders. I want Lucy to beat this game, and I'll be happy to watch her try." Ross Bonaime of Collider gave the episode a 9 out of 10 and wrote, "Even as the series seems ready to head to New Vegas, giving fans of the game a familiar locale that they love and recognize, Fallout has found a fascinating way to adapt this story for television. As one mission ends, another begins, and while that's the normal nature of Fallout, this next journey feels like Fallout as a property exploring this universe in an entirely new way, and we can't wait to see where this story picks up in Season 2."

Joshua Kristian McCoy of Game Rant gave the episode a 4 star rating out of 5 and wrote, "With a sharp wit, some fun set pieces, and a solid creative vision, Amazon published a shockingly solid adaptation of something that seemed impossible. Fallout is a blast from beginning to end." Greg Wheeler of The Review Geek gave the episode a 4 star rating out of 5 and wrote, "This finale, and the show as a whole really, has done an excellent job in capturing the moral ambiguity of the games and the different choices you get to make."

=== Accolades ===
TVLine named Walton Goggins and Ella Purnell as the "Performers of the Week" for the week of April 20, 2024, for their performances in the episode. The site wrote, "Both Walton Goggins and Ella Purnell clearly had tons of fun with their respective Fallout roles, as the ruthless Ghoul and do-right Lucy. But the finale found each of their characters (or a pre-apocalyptic version thereof) confronted with very serious, horrible truths, paving the way for outstanding performances."
