= The Golden Rule (Fallout) =

- Fallout episode
- Episode no.: Season 2 Episode 2
- Directed by: Frederick E. O. Toye
- Written by: Chris Brady-Denton
- Cinematography by: Jonathan Freeman
- Editing by: Micah Gardner
- Original air date: December 24, 2025
- Running time: 58 minutes

Guest appearances
- Michael Cristofer as Elder Cleric Quintus; Kumail Nanjiani as Xander Harkness; Xelia Mendes-Jones as Dane; Bashir Salahuddin as Joseph; Rachel Marsh as Claudia; Adam Faison as Ronnie McCurtry; Rajat Suresh as Clark; Jeremy Levick as Pete; Brian Thompson as Coronado Elder; Sisa Grey as Yosemite Elder; Chris Browning as Grand Canyon Elder; Judson Mills as Stephen Winthrop; Shinelle Azoroh as Julia

Episode chronology
← Previous "The Innovator"	Next → "The Profligate"
- Fallout season 2

"The Golden Rule" is the second episode of the second season of the American post-apocalyptic drama television series Fallout. It is the tenth overall episode of the series and was written by Chris Brady-Denton, and directed by executive producer Frederick E. O. Toye. It was released on Amazon Prime Video on December 24, 2025.

The series depicts the aftermath of an apocalyptic nuclear exchange in an alternate history of Earth where advances in nuclear technology after World War II led to the emergence of a retrofuturistic society and a subsequent resource war. The survivors took refuge in fallout shelters known as Vaults, built to preserve humanity in the event of nuclear annihilation. The episode delves into Maximus's past and his sense of belonging in the Brotherhood and introduces Caesar's Legion as a faction.

The episode received highly positive reviews from critics, who praised the performances, character development and themes.

== Plot ==
In 2283, a caravan trader arrives in Shady Sands delirious and constantly repeating himself. Maximus's father finds an implanted chip in the back of the man's neck before discovering a nuclear bomb hidden on the caravan. After he fails to disarm it, he and his wife sacrifice themselves to save Maximus, hiding him in a refrigerator, before Shady Sands is destroyed at Hank's command.

In 2296, Lucy and the Ghoul hear a woman scream from an abandoned hospital. Against the Ghoul's wishes, Lucy ventures in to investigate, with the two discovering a wounded man and woman. The Ghoul murders the man after noticing the two are from Caesar's Legion. He cannibalizes him, until he realises that the man had been poisoned. Radscorpions begin to attack the group, with the woman and the Ghoul both stung. Lucy uses her last stimpak on the woman instead of the Ghoul because of his cruelty shown to her, telling him that she will return for him once she returns the woman to her home. After rescuing the woman, the woman leads Lucy back to a Legion camp to be captured.

In Vault 31, the reawakened Vault-Tec executives are at first panicked about being trapped and awakened early, but are soon led by Norm into escaping under the guise of it being a test called for by Bud Askins. They discover a maintenance hatch, which eventually leads them to the surface.

Meanwhile, Hank continues his implanted chip tests: first on mice, then on a reawakened Vault-Tec customer, with all tests resulting in their subjects exploding.

Knight Maximus recovers a piece of technology that is used to uncover Area 51, which the Mojave chapter of the Brotherhood of Steel take as their new base. Elder Quintus invites the Elders of other local chapters together to discuss a civil war against the stronger Commonwealth chapter, with the help of using the cold fusion technology seized from Lee Moldaver. Dane and Maximus disagree on the course of action taken. Brotherhood Knights have a power armor fight while the Elders and chapter watch, before Maximus is challenged to a fight by a much larger Knight. The two fight without power armor, Maximus is able to overcome the Knight, and kills him with his own knife, to Quintus's approval. After the fight, an envoy from the Commonwealth chapter, Paladin Xander Harkness, arrives unannounced to discuss the proposed civil war.

== Production ==
=== Development ===
The episode was written by Chris Brady-Denton, and directed by executive producer Frederick E. O. Toye. It was Brady-Denton's debut writing credit and Toye's fourth directing credit.

== Critical reception ==
"The Golden Rule" received highly positive reviews from critics. Matt Purslow of IGN gave the episode a "great" 8 out 10 rating and wrote in his verdict, "By laying the groundwork for the storylines ahead and immediately making progress down those roads, “The Golden Rule” makes for a better season premiere than Fallout Season 2's actual opener. While Lucy and The Ghoul still feel like they're slightly lagging behind the progress of everyone else, they thankfully remain extremely good company. It's the Brotherhood of Steel's bold push for civil war, though, and the tease of even crueller factions awaiting in the Mojave wasteland, that make this episode feel like the real start of a big, exciting season."

William Hughes of The A.V. Club gave the episode a "B" grade and wrote, "Even the most rote of these stories has good or funny stuff, like Lucy subjecting The Ghoul to her re-telling of A Christmas Carol, or the segment where Norm constructs a semi-literal corporate ladder to climb his way out of the Vault. But Fallout, when it's really cooking, is a smart enough show to have its component sections reflect on each other. So far, though, it's coming in as exactly the sum of its parts. Nothing less, but also nothing more."

Jack King of Vulture gave the episode a 3 star rating out of 5 and wrote, "I don't remember any of the episodes in Fallout season one feeling especially like filler, but I suppose it's not a bad return for a show to only just start feeling slow — and a little monotonous — in its tenth total episode. Not that it isn't an entertaining enough 50 minutes of television; we're just repeating many of the same beats that we already covered in episode one, not to mention most of the first season." Sean T. Collins of Decider wrote, "Lucy's optimism is presented as a strength even when it gets her into trouble; in Fallout's view, it's the world, not Lucy, that is wrong and must be made to change."

Eric Francisco of Esquire wrote, "It's no classic, but Fallout delivers another rousing hour even if things don't feel like they're moving as fast as they ought to." Ross Bonaime of Collider gave the episode a 7 out of 10 and wrote, "For a show that can often be a silly, playful look at a destroyed world, we need episodes like “The Golden Rule” to show just how terrifying this battle for power and the fate of the world truly is in the Fallout universe."

Alexandria Ingham of TV Fanatic gave the episode a 4 star rating out of 5 and wrote, "For now, we're just focused on the dangers of people like Hank. Nobody is safe when it comes to proving to (presumably) House that he is worthy of a promotion." Greg Wheeler of The Review Geek gave the episode a 3.5 star rating out of 5 and wrote, "Fallout returns this week with another chapter that sees the dysfunctional wasteland come into full view. A lot of the lore and discipline around these different factions has largely been changed here from the games, but it's not all bad."
