= YHWH (Person of Interest) =

- Person of Interest episode
- Episode no.: Season 4 Episode 22
- Directed by: Chris Fisher
- Written by: Dan Dietz & Greg Plageman
- Cinematography by: David Insley
- Editing by: Scott A. Jacobs & Mark Conte
- Production code: 3J5422
- Original air date: May 5, 2015
- Running time: 43 minutes

Guest appearances
- Annie Ilonzeh as Harper Rose; John Doman as Senator Ross Garrison; Wrenn Schmidt as Dr. Iris Campbell; Luke Kleintank as Caleb Phipps; Winston Duke as Dominic Besson; John Nolan as John Greer; Nick E. Tarabay as Devon Grice; Suzy Jane Hunt as Schiffman; Jessica Pimentel as Floyd; Enrico Colantoni as Carl Elias; Camryn Manheim as Control

Episode chronology
← Previous "Asylum"	Next → "B.S.O.D."

"YHWH" is the 22nd episode and season finale of the fourth season of the American television drama series Person of Interest. It is the 90th overall episode of the series and is written by Dan Dietz and executive producer Greg Plageman and directed by co-executive producer Chris Fisher. It aired on CBS in the United States and on CTV in Canada on May 5, 2015.

The series revolves around a computer program for the federal government known as "The Machine" that is capable of collating all sources of information to predict terrorist acts and to identify people planning them. A team follows "irrelevant" crimes: lesser level of priority for the government. However, their security and safety is put in danger following the activation of a new program named Samaritan. In the episode, the team races to find the location of the Machine as Samaritan starts spreading power outages throughout the country to reduce its power. The title refers to "Tetragrammaton", the four-letter Hebrew word יהוה (transliterated as YHWH) for the name of God.

According to Nielsen Media Research, the episode was seen by an estimated 8.18 million household viewers and gained a 1.1/4 ratings share among adults aged 18–49. The episode received near universal acclaim, with critics praising the acting, action scenes, pace, directing, writing and set-up for the next season.

== Plot ==
Samaritan has caused power outages on the West Coast and is expanding to other territories. At the train station, Finch (Michael Emerson) and Root (Amy Acker) hear a payphone ringing from the other side of a wall and Root smashes it with a sledgehammer to get to it. It's a message from the Machine, asking for their help.

At the New York Savings Bank, Dominic (Winston Duke) still has Reese (Jim Caviezel), Fusco (Kevin Chapman) and Elias (Enrico Colantoni) as his hostages. Harper (Annie Ilonzeh), who was sent by the Machine, helps Fusco to release himself and escape. Dominic realizes her defection and handcuffs her alongside Reese and Elias. In Washington, D.C., Control (Camryn Manheim) expresses her concerns about a possible terrorist attack on May 6 and is horrified when she finds that Samaritan forged a memo in her name.

The Machine leads Finch and Root to a penthouse where they steal night-vision goggles from gangsters. They then infiltrate Caleb Phipps's company for the server room to retrieve a compression algorithm when Caleb (Luke Kleintank) appears. But upon recognizing Finch, he hands them the algorithm as well as some RAM chips needed for their mission. Finch is then contacted by Dominic, who demands his presence or he will kill Reese. Root convinces him to continue with their mission, confident that the Machine will save Reese.

The Machine sends fax instructions to Reese, who uses them to break loose and subdue Dominic's men with the Machine's help in God Mode. Dominic tries to escape but Fusco arrives with a raid team, arresting him. Elias is also arrested for his presence on the scene. Concerned about her safety, Reese tells Dr. Campbell (Wrenn Schmidt) to hide, promising to explain everything later, which she accepts. Back in Washington, D.C., Control and Devon Grice (Nick E. Tarabay) raid a house in Columbia Heights and discover a propane tank, as well as a few others missing, indicating that the perpetrator plans an attack. Control then talks with Senator Garrison (John Doman) to discuss the matter and shut down Samaritan, but he refuses, unwilling to believe that Decima would prepare an attack. Unknown to Garrison, Control used the meeting to clone his phone.

Greer (John Nolan) arrives at Fort George G. Meade but finds Control waiting for him, holding a gun. A misstep makes her realize that the target for the attack is the Supreme Court as it will have a hearing on the surveillance matter. She dispatches Grice to evacuate the building and find the bomb. Finch and Root arrive at a house in Brooklyn just as Reese arrives there per instructions from the Machine. A delivery man arrives with 15 laptops signed on Finch's name. Decima's agents arrive and have a brief gunfight before Finch is able to open the doors to a vault. It's revealed that it houses an electrical substation. The team realizes that the Machine is everywhere as it's connected through the electrical grid. As Samaritan is cutting power to prevent its spread, the Machine wants the team to store its core on the RAM chips so that they can rebuild it.

Greer then confesses that Samaritan didn't plan a terrorist attack. The real plan was a test that consisted of people who need to be eliminated for the betterment of society and Control failed the test. Greer then has his men take Control away and kill Grice for his knowledge of The Correction. Fusco is transferring Elias and Dominic when they are rammed by a car sent by Elias to save him. Dominic also escapes, kills Elias' henchman and nearly kills Elias until Fusco convinces him not do it. However, Dominic is killed by a Samaritan operative, who also shoots Elias, severely wounding him.

As Decima's agents start entering the station, Reese distracts them with the help of the Machine while Finch and Root start downloading The Machine's core code to a briefcase contained with the compression algorithm and RAM chips. As its view of the world dwindles, the Machine starts transmitting a final message to Finch, thanking him for creating it. A power surge destroys the computers in the substation, but the team manages to disconnect the briefcase before the surge apparently reaches it. The team walks out with the briefcase to face more Samaritan operatives.

== Reception ==
=== Viewers ===
In its original American broadcast, "YHWH" was seen by an estimated 8.18 million household viewers and gained a 1.1/4 ratings share among adults aged 18–49, according to Nielsen Media Research. This means that 1.1 percent of all households with televisions watched the episode, while 4 percent of all households watching television at that time watched it. This was a 4% decrease in viewership from the previous episode, which was watched by 8.45 million viewers with a 1.4/4 in the 18–49 demographics. With these ratings, Person of Interest was the third most watched show on CBS for the night, behind NCIS: New Orleans and NCIS, second on its timeslot and tenth for the night in the 18–49 demographics, behind Hell's Kitchen, Undateable, The Flash, Dancing with the Stars, Agents of S.H.I.E.L.D., Chicago Fire, NCIS: New Orleans, The Voice and NCIS.

With Live +7 DVR factored in, the episode was watched by 11.10 million viewers with a 1.8 in the 18–49 demographics.

=== Critical reviews ===
"YHWH" received near universal acclaim from critics. Matt Fowler of IGN gave the episode an "amazing" 9.5 out of 10 rating and wrote in his verdict, "With 'YHWH,' Person of Interest once again capped off its season in grand, thrilling style by subverting our expectations and delivering exciting, wholly original TV. Instead of rising up to victory, Team Machine once again found themselves on the extreme defensive, losing almost everything in the process. Elias, Dominic and Control all fell to Samaritan's 'test,' basically scorching the show's earth and sending us into next season with the thinnest ensemble the show's had since the very first half of Season 1."

Alexa Planje of The A.V. Club gave the episode an "A−" grade and wrote, "Person of Interest is partly about national security and the debate between surveillance versus privacy. The fact that a character that could easily be reduced to being the face of one side of a debate has evolved into so much more speaks volumes about Person of Interest's capacity to address real world issues through fiction in a nuanced way."

Chancellor Agard of Entertainment Weekly wrote, "The war has been both philosophical and physical; however, Person of Interest has always been more interested in the former. The philosophical conflict between The Machine and Samaritan is front and center in POI's fourth season finale 'YHWH.'"
