= Siobhan Fallon Hogan =

American actress (born 1961)

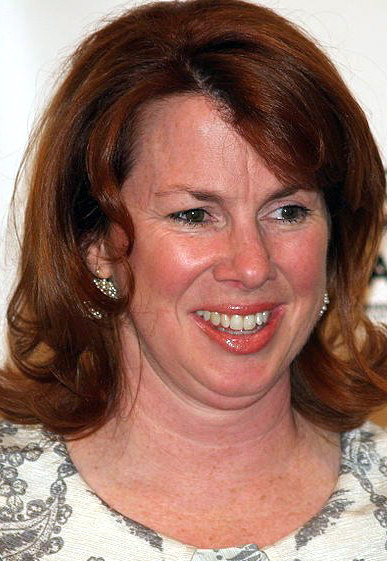
- Hogan in 2008
- Born: Siobhan Fallon; May 13, 1961 (age 65); Syracuse, New York, U.S.
- Education: Catholic University of America (MFA)
- Occupations: Actress; comedian; film producer; screenwriter
- Years active: 1981–present
- Spouse: Peter Hogan (m. 1992)
- Children: 3

Siobhan Fallon Hogan (/ʃəˈvɑːn/ shə-VAHN; née Fallon; born May 13, 1961) is an American actress, comedian, writer, and producer. Known for her collaborations with director Lars von Trier: Dancer in the Dark (2000), Dogville (2003), and The House That Jack Built (2018). Her other film credits include Forrest Gump (1994), Men in Black (1997), The Negotiator (1998), Holes (2003), Daddy Day Care (2003), Fever Pitch (2005), Charlotte's Web (2006), Funny Games (2007), Baby Mama (2008), The Bounty Hunter (2010), We Need to Talk About Kevin (2011), Going in Style (2017), and Rushed (2021). Her television work includes Saturday Night Live (1991–1992), Seinfeld (1991–1994), and Wayward Pines (2015–2016).

== Early life ==
Hogan was born in Syracuse, New York, the daughter of Jane (née Eagan) and William J. Fallon, an attorney. She was raised Catholic, and is of Irish descent. Hogan grew up in Cazenovia, New York and graduated from Cazenovia High School in 1979. She graduated from Le Moyne College in 1983, earning her Masters in Fine Arts from The Catholic University of America two years later.

== Career ==
After starting out in television with guest parts on The Golden Girls and Seinfeld, as well as a regular position on Saturday Night Live between 1991 and 1992, Hogan made her feature film debut in 1994 with a small but memorable appearance in Forrest Gump. Subsequent projects included supporting roles in Striptease (1996), Fools Rush In (1997), Men in Black (1997), and The Negotiator (1998).

Hogan made the move into more serious film work when she was cast as Brenda, a sympathetic prison guard, in Lars von Trier's critically divisive 2000 musical tragedy, Dancer in the Dark: "I guess I was pegged for awhile [as] a comedic character actress, and [von Trier, being European] didn't know that I was — so he gave me a shot at playing a really serious role". She also featured on the film's soundtrack, duetting with co-star Björk on the track "107 Steps". Hogan then re-teamed with von Trier to play Martha, a seemingly kind villager whose capacity for cruelty is gradually unleashed, in the experimental drama Dogville (2003). That same year, she took on supporting parts in the financially successful comedies Holes and Daddy Day Care. Hogan continued to work in a variety of films throughout the decade, including the children's fantasy Charlotte's Web (2006) and the rom-coms Fever Pitch (2005), Baby Mama (2008), and New in Town (2009). She also appeared as Betsy, an affluent neighbour, in Michael Haneke's darkly satirical Funny Games (2007); an American remake of his Austrian film of the same name.

Following parts in The Bounty Hunter (2010), We Need to Talk About Kevin (2011), Going in Style (2017), and The House That Jack Built (2018; her third collaboration with Lars von Trier)—as well as her recurring portrayal of Arlene Moran, a sheriff's office receptionist, on two seasons of the Fox sci-fi mystery series Wayward Pines (2015–2016)—Hogan made her screenwriting debut with the 2021 thriller, Rushed, in which she also starred as a distraught mother grieving the death of her teenage son. Co-produced by von Trier's Zentropa, it was released through Vertical Entertainment to positive reviews, with Hogan's portrayal of Barbara receiving particular praise. In her review for The Guardian, critic Leslie Felperin stated:

Few actors would have been able to pull this off like Hogan, who is not only the star but also the film's screenwriter and producer. She's one of those "who-is-that-again?" character actors you've seen hundreds of times before in all sorts of films [...] she is ordinary looking but also radiant, a force of nature in a fringed buckskin coat. [The director] just rolls with it and lets Hogan steer the ship.

Hogan's next screenplay credit was Shelter in Solitude (2023), a comedy-drama set during the initial stages of the COVID-19 pandemic. Writing for Film Threat, Perry Norton called it "a charming indie film [with] guts", while Brian Orndorf of Blu-ray.com commended Hogan's script for being "more interested in character than formula", adding that her lead portrayal of Valerie, an ex-country singer who befriends a death row prisoner, was filled with "depth and sensitivity". That same year, Hogan appeared in the psychological thriller Eileen, with Vanity Fair's Richard Lawson believing her portrayal of a strict prison secretary to be one of the film's strengths, writing, "[she] practically walks off with the movie after a mere few line readings".

== Acting style ==
Hogan has said that she embraces her label as a character actress, and finds playing eccentric roles "so much more interesting [and] fun". Reflecting on being typecast in 2013, she admitted to often playing people who are "blue-collar, maybe a hick (or) dirtbag", but that she didn't mind because "I love playing that stuff".

== Personal life ==
Hogan is a member of the Atlantic Theater Company. She was once a resident of Middletown Township, New Jersey, and has a summer home in Cazenovia, New York. A resident of Rumson, New Jersey since 2005, she married commodities trader Peter Hogan in 1992, with whom she has three children: Bernadette, Peter, and Sinead.

Hogan is a practicing Catholic. She has admitted to rejecting roles that do not align with her beliefs, saying in 2013, "If I find [the material] to be immoral, or it doesn't sit right with me [then] I'm like, 'I'm not doing this' [...] My faith has cost me a lot of money".

== Filmography ==
=== Film ===
Year	Title	Role	Notes
1994	Greedy	Tina	
1994	The Paper	Lisa	
1994	Forrest Gump	Dorothy Harris	
1994	Only You	Leslie	
1995	Jury Duty	Heather	
1996	Striptease	Rita Grant	
1996	Good Money	Siobhan	
1997	Nick and Jane	Julie	
1997	Fools Rush In	Lanie	
1997	Men in Black	Beatrice	
1998	Krippendorf's Tribe	Lori	
1998	A Cool, Dry Place	Charlotte	
1998	The Negotiator	Maggie	
2000	Boiler Room	Michelle	
2000	The Photographer	Crazy Lady	
2000	Dancer in the Dark	Brenda	Nominee: Best Supporting Actress, Robert Awards; Nominee: Best Supporting Actress, Chlotrudis Awards
2001	What's the Worst That Could Happen?	Edwina	
2001	Rain	Clara	
2002	Big Trouble	Fly By Air ticket agent	
2003	Holes	Tiffany Yelnats	
2003	Daddy Day Care	Peggy	
2003	Dogville	Martha	
2005	Fever Pitch	Lana	
2006	I'll Believe You	Larry Jean	
2006	Charlotte's Web	Edith Zuckerman	
2007	Funny Games	Betsy Thompson	
2008	Baby Mama	Birthing Teacher	
2009	New in Town	Blanche Gunderson	
2010	The Bounty Hunter	Teresa	
2010	The Secret Friend	Julie	Short film
2011	Another Happy Day	Bonnie	
2011	We Need to Talk About Kevin	Wanda	
2011	Someday This Pain Will Be Useful to You	Mrs. Beemer	
2016	Conundrums	Mother Superior	Short film
2016	All We Had	Ms. Frankfurt	
2017	Going in Style	Mitzi	
2017	Weightless	Carol	
2018	Private Life	Beth	
2018	The House that Jack Built	Claire Miller (Lady 2)	
2018	The Professor	Donna	
2019	Yes	Jackie Rosenhaft	
2019	The Shed	Sheriff Dorney	
2021	Rushed	Barbara Brady	Also writer, producer
2021	Clifford the Big Red Dog	Petra	
2022	Wasted Blind	AA Counselor	Short film
2023	Eileen	Mrs. Murray	
2023	Shelter in Solitude	Valerie	Also writer, producer Winner: Best Actress, Boston International Film Festival
2023	The Zombie Wedding	Betty Morgan	
2024	Taxon	The Administrator	Short film
2024	Portland Is the New Portland	Marsha Corwood	Short film Winner: Best Actress in a Short, Garden State Film Festival

=== Television ===
Year	Title	Role	Notes
1989	The Tonight Show Starring Johnny Carson	Mind Reader	Episode #28.4
1989–1991	The Unnaturals	Various	Main cast
1990	The Golden Girls	Abby Wolfe	Episode: "Zborn Again"
1990	Babes	Caryn	Episode: "Three's a Crowd"
1991	Baby Talk	Baby Girl (voice)	Episode: "Out of Africa"
1990–1991	Haywire	Various	2 episodes
1991–1992	Saturday Night Live	Various	Series regular; 20 episodes
1991–1994	Seinfeld	Tina Robbins	3 episodes
1997	Cosby	Psychiatrist	Episode: "I'm OK, You're Hilton"
1997	Feds	Sharon Feldman	Episode: "Do No Harm"
2000	Third Watch	Annette	Episode: "Young Men and Fire"
2000	Law & Order: Special Victims Unit	Melissa Raye	Episode: "Chat Room"
2003	Law & Order: Special Victims Unit	Linda Leggatt	Episode: "Soulless"
2004	Rescue Me	Phyllis Shea	3 episodes
2007	30 Rock	Patricia	Episode: "The Fighting Irish"
2010	Sonny with a Chance	Bella	Episode: "Gassie Passes"
2010	Fred: The Movie	Hilda Figglehorn	Television film
2010	The Whole Truth	Genevieve Cofflund	Episode: "Thicker Than Water"
2011	Fred 2: Night of the Living Fred	Hilda Figglehorn	Television film
2012	Fred 3: Camp Fred	Hilda Figglehorn	Television film
2012	Fred: The Show	Hilda Figglehorn	Main cast; 24 episodes
2015–2016	Wayward Pines	Arlene Moran	Series regular; 16 episodes
2016	Scorpion	Joyce Linehan	3 episodes
2017	MacGyver	Ilene Preskin	Episode: "Fish Scaler"
2017	American Gods	Airport Lady	Episode: "The Bone Orchard"
2018	Billions	Trustee	Episode: "Hell of a Ride"
2018	Elementary	Sylvia Kozar	Episode: "The Geek Interpreter"
2019	Dark/Web	Ellen	2 episodes
2019	What We Do in the Shadows	Animal Control Officer Karen	Episode: "Animal Control"
2020	Love Life	Darby's Therapist	2 episodes
2025	Only Murders in the Building	Mrs. Morris	Episode: "After You"

== Theatre ==
Year	Title	Role	Notes
1988	Bat Girl	Various	Westside Theatre; also writer
1989	What Can I Tell You?	Various	Second Stage Theater; also writer
1990–1991	American Splendor	Carla	Hollywood Theatre
1992	As You Like It	Phebe	Delacorte Theater
1995	Luck, Pluck & Virtue	Vendor	Atlantic Theater Company
2001	Momma	Sharon Stenchel	Atlantic Theater Company; also writer
2009	The Salty Sea PTA	Various	Two River Theater; also writer
2015	Acting Out	Various	Two River Theater; also writer
2024	Mother's Farewell	Saoirse	Atlantic Theater Company; also writer
