= Fallout (American TV series) =

2024 American television series

- Genre: Action; Drama; Post-apocalyptic; Science fiction Western
- Created by: Graham Wagner; Geneva Robertson-Dworet
- Based on: Fallout by Bethesda Softworks (Note: Fallout was created by Tim Cain and Leonard Boyarsky, and developed by Black Isle Studios, and formerly published by Interplay Entertainment from 1997 to 2004. It has been owned by ZeniMax Media and developed by Bethesda Game Studios since 2007.)
- Showrunners: Graham Wagner; Geneva Robertson-Dworet
- Starring: Ella Purnell; Aaron Moten; Kyle MacLachlan; Moisés Arias; Xelia Mendes-Jones; Walton Goggins; Frances Turner
- Composer: Ramin Djawadi (Note: Theme music written by Inon Zur)
- Country of origin: United States
- Original language: English
- No. of seasons: 2
- No. of episodes: 16

Production
- Executive producers: Jonathan Nolan; Lisa Joy; Geneva Robertson-Dworet; Graham Wagner; Athena Wickham; Todd Howard; James Altman; Margot Lulick; James W. Skotchdopole; Frederick E. O. Toye
- Producer: Skye Wathen
- Cinematography: Stuart Dryburgh; Teodoro Maniaci; Alejandro Martinez; Dan Stoloff; Jonathan Freeman; John Conroy
- Editors: Ali Comperchio; Yoni Reiss; Micah Gardner; Daniel Raj Koobir
- Running time: 45–74 minutes
- Production companies: Kilter Films; Big Indie Pictures; Bethesda Game Studios; Amazon MGM Studios

Original release
- Network: Amazon Prime Video
- Release: April 10, 2024 – present

Fallout is an American post-apocalyptic drama television series created by Graham Wagner and Geneva Robertson-Dworet for Amazon Prime Video. Based on the role-playing video game franchise created by Tim Cain and Leonard Boyarsky, the series is set two centuries after the Great War of 2077, in which society has collapsed following a nuclear holocaust. It stars Ella Purnell, Aaron Moten, Kyle MacLachlan, Moisés Arias, Xelia Mendes-Jones, Walton Goggins, and Frances Turner.

Amazon purchased the rights to produce a live-action project in 2020, and the series was announced that July, with Jonathan Nolan and Lisa Joy's Kilter Films joined by Bethesda Game Studios in the production. Nolan directed the first three episodes. Bethesda Game Studios producer Todd Howard, who directed various games in the series, signed on to executive produce alongside Nolan and Joy. Robertson-Dworet and Wagner were hired as the series' showrunners in January 2022, and Goggins and Purnell were cast in February and March, respectively.

Fallout premiered on Prime Video on April 10, 2024. Its second season premiered on December 16, 2025. In May 2025, the series was renewed for a third season. The series has received generally positive reviews, with praise for its visuals and faithfulness to the source material. Critics have deemed it one of the best video game adaptations. It has garnered three Emmy Award nominations, including Outstanding Drama Series and Outstanding Lead Actor in a Drama Series for Goggins, as well as two Creative Arts Emmy Awards out of 14 nominations.

== Premise ==
The series depicts the aftermath of the Great War of 2077, an apocalyptic nuclear exchange between the United States and China. The series takes place in an alternate history of Earth, where advances in nuclear technology after World War II led to the emergence of a retrofuturistic society and a subsequent resource war.

Many survivors took refuge in fallout bunkers, known as Vaults, most being unaware that each Vault was designed to perform sociological and psychological experiments on the vault dwellers on behalf of Vault-Tec and numerous other American corporations.

219 years later in 2296, a young woman, Lucy, leaves her home in Vault 33 to venture into the dangerous wasteland of a devastated Los Angeles on a quest to find her kidnapped father. Along the way, she encounters a Brotherhood of Steel squire named Maximus and a legendary ghoul bounty hunter, who was once a famous actor named Cooper Howard, each having their own pasts and agendas to settle.

In the second season, Lucy and Cooper travel to New Vegas hoping to learn the truth about Vault-Tec, Cooper's wife and daughter, and Lucy's father. Maximus, having been promoted in rank within the Brotherhood, becomes increasingly disillusioned with the Brotherhood's internal corruption and the conflict between his own conscience and the order's code.

== Cast and characters ==
=== Main ===
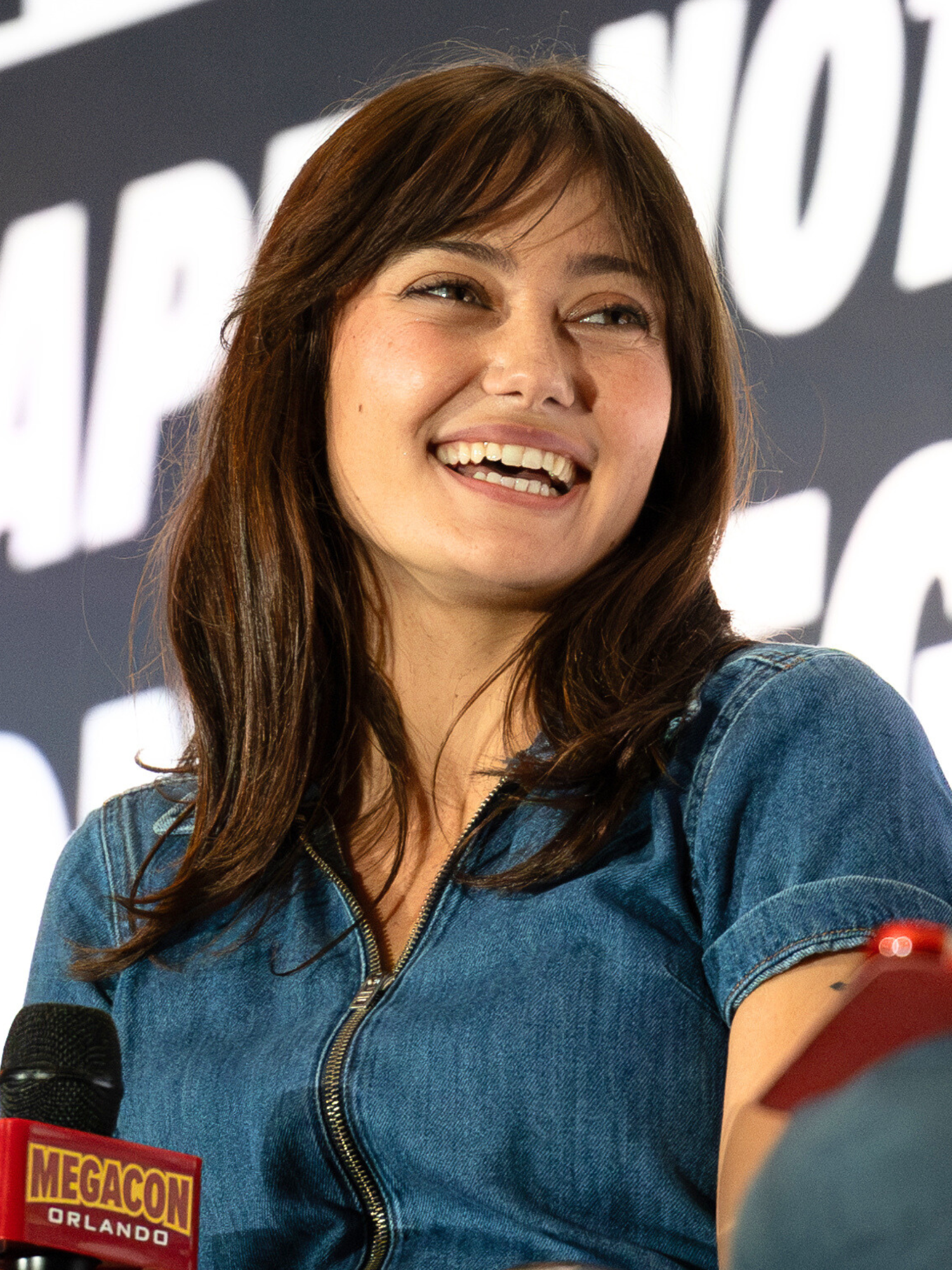
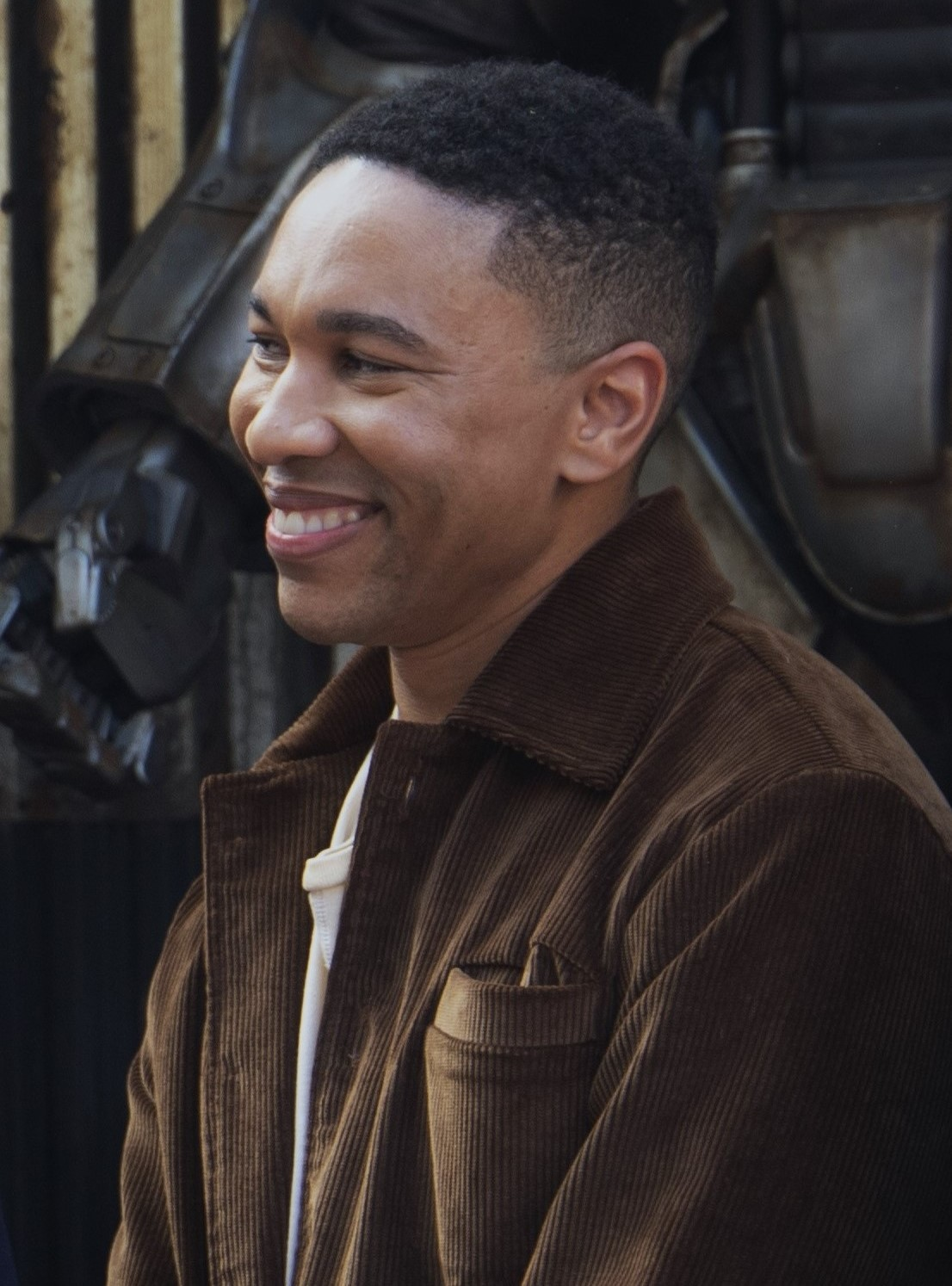
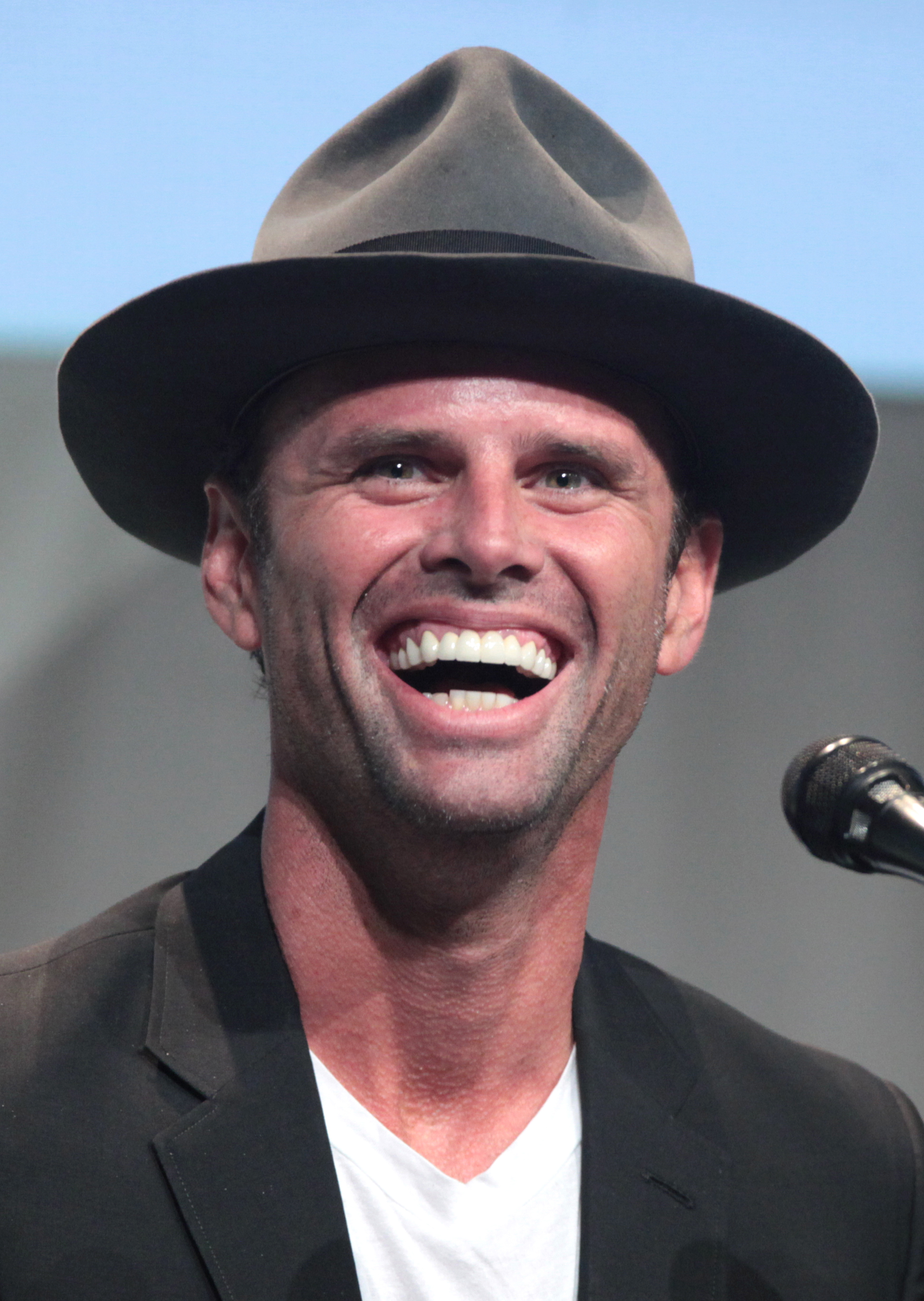
Ella Purnell, Aaron Moten, and Walton Goggins star in Fallout.
- Ella Purnell as Lucy MacLean, a Vault 33 Dweller
  - Luciana VanDette (guest season 1) and Grace Kelly Quigley (guest season 2) portray young Lucy MacLean
- Aaron Moten as Maximus, a squire of the Brotherhood of Steel and later ally of Lucy
  - Amir Carr portrays young Maximus (guest seasons 1–2)
- Kyle MacLachlan (Note: Credited as part of the main cast only for episodes in which they appear.) as Hank MacLean, Lucy and Norm's father and Overseer of Vault 33
- Moisés Arias as Norm MacLean, Vault 33 resident and Lucy's younger brother
  - Cody Alexander Guevara portrays young Norm MacLean (guest season 2)
- Xelia Mendes-Jones as Dane (season 1; recurring season 2), a scribe of the Brotherhood of Steel
- Walton Goggins as Cooper Howard / The Ghoul, a Hollywood actor and Vault-Tec ambassador before the Great War, who mutated into a ghoul and is now a gunslinger and bounty hunter
- Frances Turner as Barb Howard (season 2–present; recurring season 1), Cooper's wife and high-ranking Vault-Tec executive
- Annabel O'Hagan as Stephanie Harper (season 3; recurring seasons 1–2), pregnant Vault 33 resident. In the second season, she becomes the overseer of Vault 32.
- Dave Register as Chet (season 3; recurring seasons 1–2), Lucy and Norm's cousin and Vault 33 gatekeeper

=== Recurring ===
- Sarita Choudhury as Kate Williams / Lee Moldaver (season 1; guest season 2), a nuclear scientist who survived the Great War and later became a New California Republic (NCR) commander
- Leslie Uggams as Betty Pearson, Vault 33 councillor and later Overseer
  - Princess Bey portrays young Betty Pearson (guest seasons 1–2)
- Johnny Pemberton as Thaddeus, a squire of the Brotherhood of Steel
- Zach Cherry as Woody Thomas (season 1; guest season 2), Vault 33 councillor
- Rodrigo Luzzi as Reg McPhee, Vault 33 councillor
- Leer Leary as Davey, Vault 33 resident
- Elle Vertes as Rose MacLean (season 1), Lucy and Norm's mother
- Teagan Meredith as Janey Howard (season 1; guest season 2), Cooper's daughter
- Michael Cristofer as Elder Cleric Quintus (season 2; guest season 1), Maximus' superior and leader of the Brotherhood of Steel's San Fernando chapter
- Jon Daly as the Snake Oil Salesman (season 2; guest season 1), who is a mercantile denizen of the wasteland
- Justin Theroux as Robert Edwin House (season 2), the CEO of RobCo Industries and ruler of the New Vegas Strip in 2281. He previously appeared in the video game Fallout: New Vegas.
  - Rafi Silver portrays a body-double version of the character (season 2; guest season 1)
- Rachel Marsh as Claudia (season 2), a novice Vault-Tec employee who was cryogenically frozen in Vault 31
- Adam Faison as Ronnie McCurtry (season 2), Bud Askin's former assistant and one of the Vault-Tec employees who were cryogenically frozen in Vault 31
- Rajat Suresh and Jeremy Levick as Clark and Pete (season 2), part of the group of Vault-Tec employees who were cryogenically frozen in Vault 31
- Martha Kelly as Representative Diane Welch (season 2), a pre-apocalypse congresswoman for the district of Glendale
- Jon Gries as Biff (season 2), a ranger for the New California Republic

=== Guest ===
Introduced in season 1

- Mykelti Williamson as Honcho, a bounty hunter who revives Cooper from imprisonment
- Matt Berry as:
  - "Mr. Handy", a General Atomics helper bot in 2077
  - "Snip Snip", a Mr. Handy turned organ harvester
  - Sebastian Leslie, an English actor who provided the voice of the Handys, and Cooper's pre-apocalypse friend
- Cameron Cowperthwaite as Monty, a raider who "married" Lucy as part of a ruse to kidnap Hank
- Jacinto Taras Riddick as Cleric Felix, high-ranking member of the Brotherhood of Steel
- Joel Marsh Garland and Jacob A. Ware as Biggie and Slim, Honcho's minions
- Mike Doyle and Janie Brookshire as Bob Spencer and Rhonda Spencer, Cooper's pre-apocalypse employers for their child's birthday party
- Michael Emerson as Dr. Siggi Wilzig (seasons 1–2), an enigmatic defector from the Enclave whose head carries the solution to Cold Fusion
- Michael Rapaport as Knight Titus, whom Maximus initially serves and later impersonates
- Dale Dickey as Ma June (seasons 1–2), a cantankerous shopkeeper in the settlement of Filly
- Edythe Jason as Barv (seasons 1–2), June's partner and a resident of Filly
- Michael Abbott Jr. as a lonesome farmer living just outside Filly
- Neal Huff as Roger, a ghoul and friend of Cooper's, slowly succumbing to ferality
- Michael Esper as Bud Askins / Brain-on-a-Roomba (seasons 1–2), a senior junior vice president at Vault-Tec in 2077 and the Overseer of Vault 31 post-war
- Matty Cardarople and Elvis Valentino Lopez as Huey and Squirrel, a pair of bumbling organ harvesters
- Chris Parnell as Benjamin, the Cyclops Overseer of Vault 4
- Cherien Dabis as Birdie, a surface-born resident of Vault 4 and former resident of Shady Sands
- Glenn Fleshler as Sorrel Booker, the self-titled "President" of The Govermint (sic) who seeks to maintain order in the Wasteland
- Dallas Goldtooth as Charles Whiteknife (seasons 1–2), a pre-apocalypse actor friend of Cooper's
- Eric Berryman as Lloyd Hawthorne, the first overseer of Vault 4
- Angel Desai as Cassandra Hawthorne, Lloyd's wife
- Fred Armisen as DJ Carl, the host of an old-timey radio station
- Erik Estrada as Adam, a former ranger for the New California Republic turned farmer whose son is affiliated with Moldaver
- Michael Mulheren as Frederick Sinclair, a representative of Big MT and the founder of the Sierra Madre Casino
- James Yaegashi as Leon Von Felden, a top West-Tek executive
- Rebecca Watson as Julia Masters, a top REPCONN executive

Introduced in season 2

- Susan Berger as Old Woman Gretch, an elderly soup seller
- Jared Bankens as Nick the Prick, the leader of the Great Khans raiders
- Christopher Matthew Cook as Bill, a pre-apocalypse bar patron
- Kumail Nanjiani as Paladin Xander Harkness, a liaison to the Commonwealth Brotherhood of Steel
- Bashir Salahuddin and Shinelle Azoroh as Joseph and Julia, Maximus's father and mother
- Brian Thompson, Sisa Grey, and Chris Browning as the Coronado Elder, Yosemite Elder, and Grand Canyon Elder, the cleric leaders of separate Brotherhood of Steel chapters
- Judson Mills as Stephen Winthrop, a rich businessman cryogenically frozen by Vault-Tec
- Tim Soergel as Gnatius, a knight of the Brotherhood
- Macaulay Culkin as Lacerta Legate, a high-ranking member of Caesar's Legion, a society inspired by Ancient Roman traditions
- Barbara Eve Harris as Rodriguez, a captain of the New California Republic
- Guy Heilweil, Ava Scarola, and Alyssa Riley Ndati as Perry, Lois, and Trudy, children who work in Thaddeus' factory
- Ciel Shi as Wenjie, a pre-apocalypse Chinese soldier
- Edwin Lee Gibson as Shotgun Jeff, a bartender in New Vegas
- Tony Robinette as Simon, the shopkeeper for the Sunny's Sundries general store in New Vegas
- Ron Perlman as a super mutant who encounters Cooper
- Clancy Brown as the last pre-apocalypse President of the United States
- Natasha Henstridge as Joan, Stephanie's pre-apocalypse mother who attempts to escape with her from Canada

== Episodes ==
Season	Episodes	Originally released	
Season	Episodes	First released	Last released
1	8	April 10, 2024	
2	8	December 16, 2025	February 3, 2026

=== Season 1 (2024) ===
No. overall	No. in season	Title	Directed by	Written by	Original release date
1	1	"The End"	Jonathan Nolan	Geneva Robertson-Dworet & Graham Wagner	April 10, 2024
2	2	"The Target"	Jonathan Nolan	Geneva Robertson-Dworet & Graham Wagner	April 10, 2024
3	3	"The Head"	Jonathan Nolan	Geneva Robertson-Dworet & Graham Wagner	April 10, 2024
4	4	"The Ghouls"	Daniel Gray Longino	Kieran Fitzgerald	April 10, 2024
5	5	"The Past"	Clare Kilner	Carson Mell	April 10, 2024
6	6	"The Trap"	Frederick E. O. Toye	Karey Dornetto	April 10, 2024
7	7	"The Radio"	Frederick E. O. Toye, Clare Kilner	Chaz Hawkins	April 10, 2024
8	8	"The Beginning"	Wayne Yip	Gursimran Sandhu	April 10, 2024

=== Season 2 (2025–26) ===
No. overall	No. in season	Title	Directed by	Written by	Original release date
9	1	"The Innovator"	Frederick E. O. Toye	Geneva Robertson-Dworet & Graham Wagner	December 16, 2025
10	2	"The Golden Rule"	Frederick E. O. Toye	Chris Brady-Denton	December 24, 2025
11	3	"The Profligate"	Liz Friedlander	Chaz Hawkins	December 31, 2025
12	4	"The Demon in the Snow"	Stephen Williams	Jane Espenson	January 7, 2026
13	5	"The Wrangler"	Liz Friedlander	Owen Ellickson	January 14, 2026
14	6	"The Other Player"	Lisa Joy	Dave Hill	January 21, 2026
15	7	"The Handoff"	Stephen Williams	Kieran Fitzgerald	January 27, 2026
16	8	"The Strip"	Frederick E. O. Toye	Karey Dornetto	February 3, 2026

== Production ==
=== Development ===
Bethesda had been approached several times about a television adaptation of the Fallout video games since the developer released Fallout 3 in 2008, according to Bethesda's Todd Howard, though he felt none of the suggestions met the vision of the Fallout series. Bethesda's marketing executive Pete Hines had also warned the company in 2015 about the potential impact of a poor adaptation of their video games, saying: "There's way more things that can go wrong than can go right with this", since the adaptation's director may override the vision of the series. Hines pointed to the example of the 2005 Doom film as an example of a bad adaptation.

The situation changed when Jonathan Nolan approached Bethesda with his idea of a Fallout television series, having been an avid player of the game series. Howard, having seen what Nolan had created with the Westworld series, found that Nolan had a clear vision for the adaptation, and agreed this approach was a good way to bring the game series to the television screen. Bethesda gave Nolan the freedom to craft a story as long as it remained true to the Fallout universe but served as its unique narrative within the game series and not translate one of the existing games to television.

The television adaptation was formally announced in July 2020 under Amazon Studios (later renamed Amazon MGM Studios) with Nolan and Lisa Joy developing the work. Joy described the series as "a gonzo, crazy, funny, adventure, and mindfuck like none you've ever seen before". In January 2022, Geneva Robertson-Dworet and Graham Wagner were hired as show runners for the series, with Nolan set to direct the pilot episode. The series is canon within the Fallout continuity. Howard wanted an original story instead of an adaptation of the games, though the series incorporates game storylines and factions, such as the Brotherhood of Steel. The series' 2296 setting is the furthest in the future that the Fallout franchise has occurred. On April 18, 2024, Amazon Prime Video renewed the series for a second season. The first season had a budget of $153 million. In May 2025, the series was renewed for a third season.

=== Casting ===
In February 2022, Walton Goggins was cast in a lead role as Cooper Howard, a Hollywood actor who became a ghoul after the bombs fell. In March 2022, Ella Purnell joined the cast as a peppy Vault-Dweller. In June 2022, Kyle MacLachlan (Hank MacLean), Xelia Mendes-Jones (Dane) and Aaron Moten (Maximus) joined as regulars. In October 2023, additional casting including Sarita Choudhury (Moldaver), Michael Emerson (Dr. Siggi Wilzig), Leslie Uggams (Betty Pearson) and Zach Cherry (Woody Thomas) was announced.

In November 2024, Macaulay Culkin joined the cast for the second season in an undisclosed role. In August 2025, it was revealed that Justin Theroux would portray Robert House for the second season.

In May 2026, Aaron Paul joined the cast for the third season, and both Annabel O'Hagan and Dave Register were promoted to series regulars. In June 2026, Manny Jacinto, Emily Mortimer, and Thomasin McKenzie joined the cast in recurring roles.

=== Filming ===
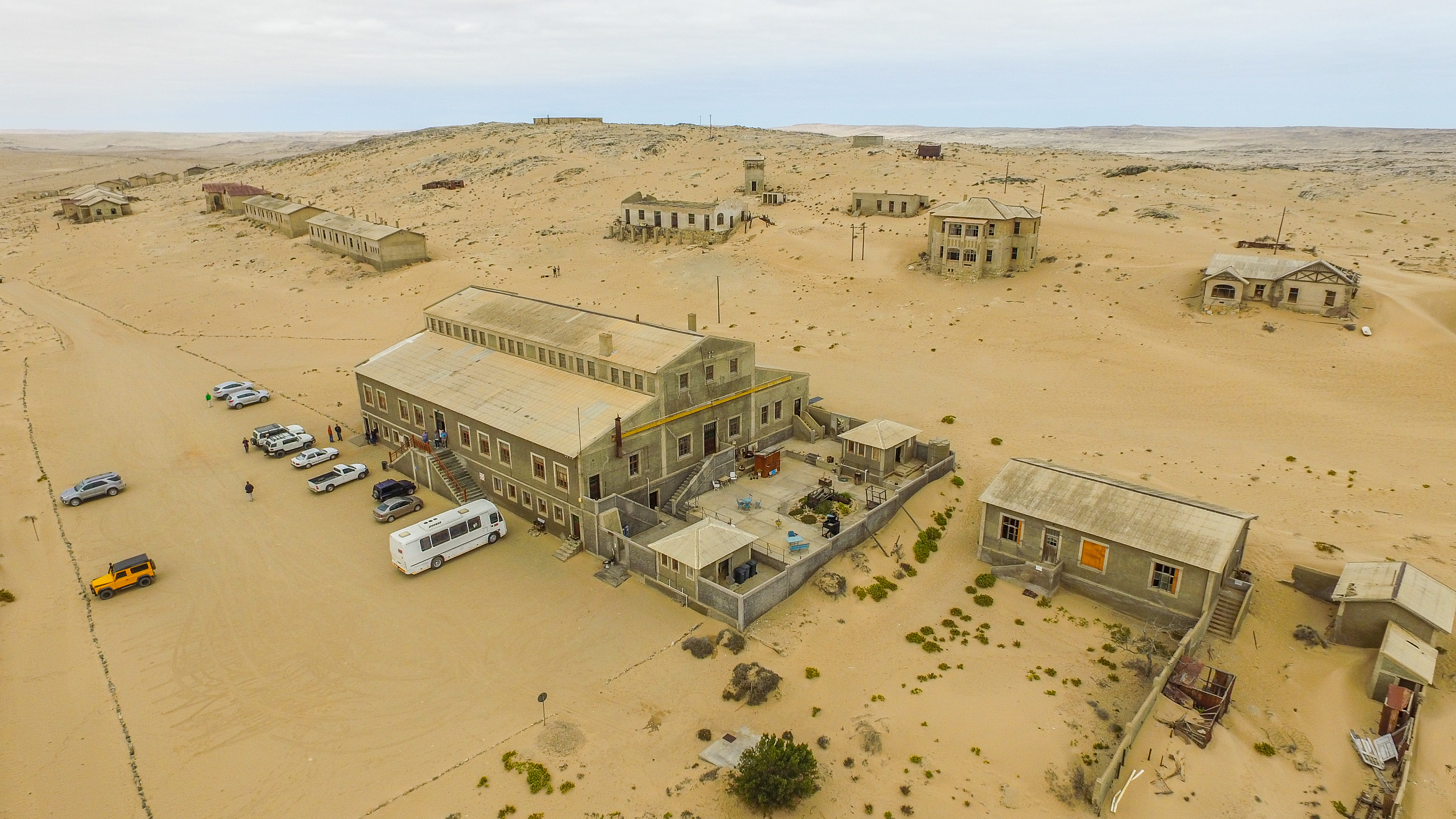
An overhead shot of Kolmanskop, Namibia, which was used for filming shots in the wasteland.

Principal photography began on July 5, 2022, in New Jersey, New York and Utah, and was shot on 35mm film. Wasteland scenes were additionally filmed in Kolmanskop, a former mining operation-turned-ghost town, as well as on Namibia's infamous Skeleton Coast. The desolate location is where desert sands meet the sea, where the western Namib Desert reaches Namibia's South Atlantic coastline. As a result of the treacherous seas offshore, the "skeleton" coast is dotted with both historic and recent shipwrecks; some scenes were filmed at the wreck of the Eduard Bohlen. Historic Wendover Airfield in Wendover, Utah served as the filming location of the initial Brotherhood of Steel base. This location has a unique atomic history connection as it is the airfield where the 509th Composite Group trained for the atomic missions in World War II. Nolan directed the first three episodes of the series, with Stuart Dryburgh and Teodoro Maniaci as cinematographers.

Filming for the second season occurred in Los Angeles and Toronto, to take advantage of a $25 million tax incentive offered by California. Filming was scheduled to begin in November 2024, and had begun by early December that same year. Filming was paused in January 2025, due to the Los Angeles fires. Filming for the second season wrapped on May 7, 2025.

=== Music ===
Ramin Djawadi composed a score inspired by the works of Inon Zur's Fallout series compositions. Fallout also features a licensed soundtrack similar to the video game series, including The Ink Spots and The Mills Brothers.

The first-season soundtrack was released by Amazon on April 8, 2024.

=== Post-production ===
Jay Worth was the production's visual effects supervisor, returning to work with director Jonathan Nolan and executive producer Lisa Joy following Person of Interest, Westworld, The Peripheral and Reminiscence. Grant Everett was the on-set visual effects supervisor who brought together a variety of visual effects studios for the environment, creatures, hard surface work and more. Framestore in Montreal took on the Yao Guai and Gulper creature work, RISE FX in Germany handled the Vertibird shots, Power Armor work and numerous environments, Swedish studio Important Looking Pirates took on the Cyclops overseer of Vault 4 and Snip-Snip. FutureWorks in India did the Ghoul nosework. Refuge, CoSA, Mavericks, One of Us, Studio 8 and Deep Water FX were also involved across the 3,300 visual effects shots of the season.

== Release ==
Fallout was scheduled to premiere on Amazon Prime Video on April 12, 2024, but this date was later moved forward to be released on April 10, 2024, at 6 PM Pacific Time (GMT-8:00). The second season was set to premiere on December 17, 2025, but later scheduled to release a day earlier on December 16, 2025 at 6 PM Pacific Time (GMT-8:00), with the remaining episodes released weekly through February 4, 2026.

The first season of Fallout was released on Ultra HD Blu-ray, Blu-ray, and DVD by MGM Home Entertainment on July 8, 2025. A limited edition Ultra HD Blu-Ray steelbook was released exclusively through Amazon's website and will come with six collectible art cards.

=== Webisodes ===
To promote the second season, a metafictional talk show of nine videos was released from December 18, 2025, to February 4, 2026. Titled Fallout Fake Talkshow, actors from the series play fictionalized versions of themselves being interviewed by Jon Daly in character as the Snake Oil Salesman. Actors featured include Justin Theroux, Ella Purnell, Aaron Moten, Johnny Pemberton, Macaulay Culkin, Walton Goggins, Frances Turner, Xelia Mendes-Jones, and Kyle MacLachlan.

An animated series of shorts consisting of six instructional videos for customers of the fictional RobCo Industries was released. A different RobCo product is showcased in each webisode. The series is accessible on Prime Video in the bonus section of the Fallout page, or as extras in the 4K Blu-Ray release of the second season. They were originally released on the show's social media accounts concurrently with each episode of the season.

A Yule log-style holiday video, titled Fallout: The Ghoul Log, was released on December 10, 2025.

== Reception ==
=== Viewership ===
According to Amazon, Fallout pulled in 65 million viewers in its first 16 days of availability, and was the second most-watched title in the history of the platform after The Lord of the Rings: The Rings of Power in 2022. As of October 2024, the series has surpassed 100 million viewers.

Next TV also reported that, based on viewership estimates sourced from research firm PlumResearch, Fallout delivered the largest premiere audience for any series released on Prime Video to date.

The adaptation's success on Amazon Prime Video has led to renewed commercial success of the Fallout video games, including the original game; according to Steam Charts, it experienced the highest percentage increase in player base at 160%.

=== Critical response ===
Critical response of Fallout
Season	Rotten Tomatoes	Metacritic
1	93% (133 reviews)	73 (33 reviews)
2	96% (126 reviews)	73 (22 reviews)

Fallout has an average approval rating of 94% on review aggregator Rotten Tomatoes and a weighted average score of 73/100 on Metacritic, indicating "generally favorable reviews".

==== Season 1 ====
For the first season, the review aggregator website Rotten Tomatoes reported a 93% approval rating based on 133 critic reviews, with an average rating of 8/10. The website's consensus reads: "An adaptation that feels like a true extension of the games, Fallout is a post-apocalyptic blast for newcomers and longtime fans alike". Metacritic assigned a score of 73 out of 100 based on 33 critics.

Kristen Baldwin of Entertainment Weekly gave the series a B+ and said, "The eight-episode season exists in a vivid and captivating universe that will be familiar to gamers—though knowledge of the franchise isn't required to enjoy its darkly comic dystopian pleasures." Reviewing the series for the San Francisco Chronicle, Zaki Hasan gave a rating of 3/4 and wrote, "With a raft of unfolding mysteries, protagonists we care about and a quest we want to see through to the end, Fallout is well situated to grow the loyal fan base that has kept the video game franchise going for 27 years."

Multiple critics called Fallout one of the best video game adaptations of all time. Film and television adaptations of video games as a whole have garnered a negative reputation due to multiple high-profile failures (such as the aforementioned Doom film). In this regard, commentators have compared Fallout to The Last of Us, another well-received video game adaptation for television.

In a YouTube video, Tim Cain, the creator of Fallout, praised the adaptation for matching the mood of the series and for its easter eggs and characters. He also defended the adaptation from accusations of contradicting the Fallout canon.

However, Source Weekly journalist Kayvon Bumpus described major, "incompatible" discrepancies between the show and existing canon, as established in Fallout 1 and Fallout 2. Noting that the show moved a primary location in those games by hundreds of miles without explanation, Bumpus wrote, "The Fallout show fundamentally breaks the universe that it attempts to expand."

==== Season 2 ====
The second season has a Rotten Tomatoes approval rating of 96% based on 126 reviews. The website's consensus reads, "Fallout Season Two successfully expands its post-apocalyptic world to deliver everything audiences could want from a video game adaptation, including sumptuous visuals and riveting performances." Metacritic assigned a score of 73 out of 100 based on 22 reviews.
