= Asylum (Person of Interest) =

- Person of Interest episode
- Episode no.: Season 4 Episode 21
- Directed by: Frederick E. O. Toye
- Written by: Andy Callahan & Denise Thé
- Cinematography by: David Insley
- Editing by: Ryan Malanaphy
- Production code: 3J5421
- Original air date: April 28, 2015
- Running time: 43 minutes

Guest appearances
- Annie Ilonzeh as Harper Rose; John Nolan as John Greer; Cara Buono as Martine Rousseau; Winston Duke as Dominic Besson; Jamie Hector as Lincoln "Link" Cordell; Jessica Pimentel as Floyd; Erin Dilly as Shelly; Enrico Colantoni as Carl Elias; Camryn Manheim as Control

Episode chronology
← Previous "Terra Incognita"	Next → "YHWH"

"Asylum" is the 21st episode of the fourth season of the American television drama series Person of Interest. It is the 89th overall episode of the series and is written by Andy Callahan and co-executive producer Denise Thé and directed by Frederick E. O. Toye. It aired on CBS in the United States and on CTV in Canada on April 28, 2015.

The series revolves around a computer program for the federal government known as "The Machine" that is capable of collating all sources of information to predict terrorist acts and to identify people planning them. A team follows "irrelevant" crimes: lesser level of priority for the government. However, their security and safety is put in danger following the activation of a new program named Samaritan. In the episode, the team receives the numbers of Dominic and Elias and work to solve the conflict once and for all. However, their mission is also connected to Shaw's possible location, which may be located at a psychiatric hospital.

According to Nielsen Media Research, the episode was seen by an estimated 8.45 million household viewers and gained a 1.4/4 ratings share among adults aged 18–49. The episode received critical acclaim, with critics praising the writing, performances and set-up for the finale.

== Plot ==
Control (Camryn Manheim) and her henchmen kidnap a woman (Erin Dilly) after crashing her car and put a body in the woman's car before setting it on fire. She then tortures the woman, accusing her of working with Samaritan. After hours of denial, the woman finally admits to work for it, warning Control about something coming. Meanwhile, Reese (Jim Caviezel) and Fusco (Kevin Chapman) investigate a crime scene where one of Elias' hitmen killed members of The Brotherhood. The Machine then produces two numbers: Dominic (Winston Duke) and Elias (Enrico Colantoni).

Reese and Fusco discover that Elias has set up a base of operations at the New York Savings Bank. They confront Elias, who refuses their help. Then, The Brotherhood ambushes the bank and captures them, with Harper Rose (Annie Ilonzeh) among them. At the train station, Shaw's phone rings and Root (Amy Acker) answers, hearing Shaw's voice asking for her help before hanging up. Despite Finch (Michael Emerson) being convinced that it's a trap, Root still intends to find Shaw. She blackmails the Machine to help them by threatening to kill herself in the rooftop of a building. The Machine gives her admin access to help her. They trace the call to a psychiatric hospital.

Finch and Root access the hospital's fiber-optic system and find a cryptic message from Samaritan, stating its intentions to find the Machine as it begins to crack Finch's laptop. In order to get more information, Root poses as a doctor while Finch is put in the hospital posing as a patient. He causes an inmate to fight the guards, which allows him to enter the control room and discover that the hospital's ninth floor is extremely guarded, housing the worst patients in the hospital. Root infiltrates the floor and discovers that the hospital serves as the base of operations for Greer (John Nolan) and Samaritan. She tells Finch to escape while she goes to retrieve Shaw but realizes that she has been transferred out of the hospital. She then fights Rousseau (Cara Buono) but she is subdued and sedated.

Reese, Fusco and Elias are tortured by The Brotherhood to reveal Finch's location, as they want control of the Machine, but none of them speaks out. They also want the location of a mole in The Brotherhood who worked for Elias. Elias finally gives in and reveals a phone call to confirm his mole. Dominic answers it and then kills his right hand man Link (Jamie Hector) for being identified as the rat. However, Elias laughs, revealing that he didn't have a mole in The Brotherhood and tricked Dominic to kill his friend, avenging Scarface's death. Unaware to Reese and Elias, Fusco knows that Harper was sent by the Machine. Back at Washington, D.C., Control is told by the Samaritan operative that a big event called "The Correction" will arrive on May 6 and there's nothing to stop it. As she won't say anything else, Control kills her.

Finch is captured by Greer and Root is tied to a bed in order to gain access to the Machine through her head. Before allowing it, she snaps Rousseau's neck, killing her. Samaritan gives them an ultimatum to reveal the location of the Machine or both Root and Finch will die. Despite Root's and Finch's insistence in not revealing anything, the Machine itself tells them it can't lose them and exchanges its location for their lives. They are released and Root and Finch race to find the location before Samaritan arrives. Shaw (Sarah Shahi) is revealed to be going in one of Samaritan's cars. The episode ends as Samaritan sends all of its assets to the Machine's location.

== Reception ==
=== Viewers ===
In its original American broadcast, "Asylum" was seen by an estimated 8.45 million household viewers and gained a 1.4/4 ratings share among adults aged 18–49, according to Nielsen Media Research. This means that 1.4 percent of all households with televisions watched the episode, while 4 percent of all households watching television at that time watched it. This was a 9% decrease in viewership from the previous episode, which was watched by 9.21 million viewers with a 1.5/5 in the 18-49 demographics. With these ratings, Person of Interest was the third most watched show on CBS for the night, behind NCIS: New Orleans and NCIS, second on its timeslot and eighth for the night in the 18-49 demographics, behind The Flash, Agents of S.H.I.E.L.D., Chicago Fire, Dancing with the Stars, NCIS: New Orleans, NCIS, and The Voice.

With Live +7 DVR factored in, the episode was watched by 11.22 million viewers with a 2.1 in the 18-49 demographics.

=== Critical reviews ===
"Asylum" received critical acclaim from critics. Matt Fowler of IGN gave the episode an "amazing" 9 out of 10 rating and wrote in his verdict, "Things are looked grim for Team Machine at the close of 'Asylum.' It was as if the evils that 'paranoid junkie' Finch spoke about when he was getting himself committed actually converged all at once to sink their claws into our heroes. Knowing that Control is on board, in her own way, makes me hopeful though as she's quick to pull and any all triggers without hesitation. Whether her victims be 'school teachers' or Ferry Boat passengers."

Alexa Planje of The A.V. Club gave the episode a "B+" grade and wrote, "Terrorists can be creative, you know; that's why they're so scary. A straightforward attack is what other shows would do. This isn't other shows, dammit; this is Person of Interest."
