= The Metaphysical Engine, or What Quill Did =

07 – "The Metaphysical Engine, or What Quill Did"
- Class episode
- Dorothea (Pooky Quesnel, center), Ballon (Chiké Okonkwo, right) and Miss Quill use the Metaphysical Engine to travel to a world long gone.

Cast
- Starring: Katherine Kelly – Miss Quill; Greg Austin – Charlie; Fady Elsayed – Ram; Sophie Hopkins – April; Vivian Oparah – Tanya
- Others: Jordan Renzo – Matteusz; Pooky Quesnel – Dorothea; Chiké Okonkwo – Ballon; Spencer Wilding – Quill Goddess

Production
- Directed by: Wayne Yip
- Written by: Patrick Ness
- Produced by: Derek Ritchie
- Executive producers: Patrick Ness; Steven Moffat; Brian Minchin
- Music by: Blair Mowat
- Series: Series 1
- Running time: 45 minutes
- First broadcast: 26 November 2016

Chronology
← Preceded by "Detained"	Followed by → "The Lost"

"The Metaphysical Engine, or What Quill Did" is the seventh episode of the British science fiction television series Class. It was released online by BBC Three on 26 November 2016. The episode was written by series creator Patrick Ness and directed by Wayne Che Yip; it acts as a companion piece to the previous episode "Detained", also written by Ness and directed by Che Yip.

Class follows four students of Coal Hill Academy and their alien teacher, as they deal with various alien threats. The episode takes place concurrently with "Detained", following Miss Quill's (Katherine Kelly) perspective instead of the students'; in it, Quill goes on a journey with headteacher Dorothea (Pooky Quesnel) and a shapeshifting alien named Ballon (Chiké Okonkwo) in an attempt to remove the Arn from her brain, which would free her from Charlie's (Greg Austin) authority.

Unlike all other Class episodes in which she is credited last in the main cast, Kelly receives first billing credit in the end credits, due to the other main cast members having little screen time in the episode. The episode received very positive reviews from critics, who praised its performances (most notably Kelly's), characters, themes and visuals.

== Plot ==
Having left the students in detention, Miss Quill joins headteacher Dorothea Ames, who promised to help her remove the creature known as the "Arn" forcing her to obey Charlie's authority. They are joined by Ballon, an alien kept prisoner by the Governors whose shapeshifting abilities have been frozen. The three travel using a metaphysical engine that can transport them to recreations or "ideas" of any place, as long as this place is "believed in". During their travels, they find an Arn specimen to study, obtain the blood of the "Devil" (to unfreeze Ballon's shapeshifting abilities so that he can perform surgery on Quill), and obtain the brain of a Quill goddess to study before returning to Coal Hill.

Ballon performs the surgery and removes the Arn, leaving Quill's face and eye scarred but setting her free. Having bonded and developed feelings during their journey, the two rejoice about their success and have sex, but eventually realize that they are in fact in the Cabinet of Souls, before being told by a hologram of Dorothea that the Governors never intended to let both of them return to Earth alive, and that there is only enough energy for one else to return. Having no choice, Quill and Ballon fight each other; Ballon eventually appears victorious, having grabbed the gun left by Ames and aiming it at Quill, who accepts her death, but when he reluctantly fires, the weapon fires at him instead, killing him and leaving Quill in shock and grief.

Having escaped the Cabinet, Quill finally returns to the students (tying in with the events at the end of "Detained"). As time passes differently inside the Cabinet, it has been only 45 minutes for them, but an entire day for her; additionally, her body has grown several months older. She saves Charlie and reveals that she is now free of the Arn. After she passes out from exhaustion, Charlie and Matteusz realize that she is several months pregnant.

== Continuity ==
- In the episode, when learning that Ballon is a shapeshifter, Quill believes him at first to be a Zygon. Dorothea explains that Zygons are "protected on Earth", a reference to the peace treaty between humans and Zygons living on Earth negotiated by the Tenth, Eleventh and War Doctors in the Doctor Who episode "The Day of the Doctor" (2013).

=== Outside references ===
- Quill recalls an unnamed "Earth poem"; said poem is "Home" by Warsan Shire.

== Production ==
The episode was directed by Wayne Che Yip, who also directed the preceding episode, "Detained". It premiered on 26 November 2016 at 10am. The episode was broadcast in the United States in early 2017 on BBC America.

== Reception ==
The episode received very positive reviews from critics, who praised its performances, pacing, visuals, and character development. Kelly's performance and her character's journey, in particular, were highly praised.

The A.V. Club called the episode "brilliant" and "the best example yet of the show’s wild inventiveness", highly praising its adult themes and characters. Vodzilla praised the performances of Kelly, Quesnel and Okonkwo, and the "imaginative world-building and character development", and calling it "the most vivid and ambitious episode of Class to date". Cult Box gave a positive review, praising Kelly's performance, Quill's character, and the visuals, stating that "the succession of contrasting locales were a treat".

Den of Geek gave a very positive review, praising Quill's character development, Kelly's performance, the writing and themes, and special effects. Stating that "the concurrent-episodes structure worked a treat", they felt that "what started out looking like a fun, straight-up adventure game [...] quickly pivoted into an intense exploration of character and the philosophy of liberty. As a result, the character of Quill became much more than an enjoyably sardonic warrior who does a good line in quips. She raged, empathised, grieved, challenged her existential beliefs and rediscovered her person-hood. Class stuffed a whole series’ worth of character development into forty-five gripping minutes. By so doing, it cemented its own identity as a brainy series with more ideas than you can shake a metaphysical stick at."

Flickering Myth gave a very positive review, praising the writing and Kelly's "wonderfully acerbic yet vulnerable performance". They felt that "there’s a real depth of textuality to ‘The Metaphysical Engine’, which demonstrates a lot of Patrick Ness’ greatest strengths as a writer" and that the writing was "both entertaining and thought provoking".

Mym Buzz gave a positive review, calling the episode "a gloriously entertaining mess" and "a fine, pacy, unpredictable, great-looking and unashamedly geeky piece of small screen sci-fi". They praised the visuals, Kelly and Quesnel's performances and its "interesting" themes, but felt that "a few elements felt underdeveloped and poorly explained".

Conversely, Doctor Who TV gave a mixed review, feeling that the episode failed to develop Quill further and criticized the lack of emotional investment in the episode, due to Quill herself being "barely invested in her adventure, as she is scripted with an overabundance of witty retorts [...] Unfortunately, rather than reveal Quill’s true, inner nature via her reactions to the episode’s impossible situations, writer Patrick Ness fills the script with Quill’s acerbic humor [...] This episode needed to reveal the layers of Quill’s character hidden underneath her bitterly sarcastic exterior, but the script’s reliance on one-liners do the titular character few favors."
