= Wayne Yip =

British film director

- Born: Wayne Che Yip; 1981 (age 44–45); Oxford, England
- Occupations: Television director; producer
- Years active: 2005–present

Wayne Che Yip (born 1981) is a British television director, most notably connected with Utopia, Doctor Who and Amazon Prime's The Lord of the Rings: The Rings of Power and Fallout.

== Early life and education ==
Yip was born in Oxford in 1981 and was educated at Dragon School (alongside classmate Tom Hiddleston), Abingdon School, D'Overbroeck's College and later studied at Banbury College where he graduated in 2004 with a degree in graphic design.

== Career ==
=== Work with Alex García López ===
He developed an interest in filmmaking after working in the Phoenix Picturehouse in Jericho and came to prominence when he co-wrote and directed Happy Birthday Grandad with Alex García López, which won the 2007 Sixty Seconds of Fame BAFTA.

The pair then created the short films Samantha (2008), Be Lucky (2008) and Diego's Story (2009), as well as the episode "Would Like To Meet" (2010) of the Channel 4 anthology series Coming Up.

Following on from this, they went on to direct the first half of the fourth series of Secret Diary of a Call Girl (2011), starring Billie Piper, three episodes of the third series of Misfits and the second half of the first series of Dennis Kelly's Utopia (2013).

=== Later work ===
In 2013, he came back to Misfits to direct the final episode of the show, this time without Garcia Lopez. In 2015, he directed four episodes of Tatau. He then directed two episodes of the series Class, "Detained" and "The Metaphysical Engine, or What Quill Did". This was followed by the Doctor Who series 10 episodes "The Lie of the Land" and "Empress of Mars", and the 2019 New Year's Day special episode "Resolution".

In March 2021, Amazon Prime Video announced that Yip would take over directing duties for four episodes of The Lord of the Rings: The Rings of Power series, as well as serving as co-executive producer.

He has also directed on many major series in the United States including Salem, Preacher, Into the Badlands, Happy!, Dirk Gently's Holistic Detective Agency, Doom Patrol and Hunters, starring Al Pacino.

== Filmography ==
=== Television ===
Year	Title	Notes
2010	Coming Up	Episode: "Would Like To Meet"
2011	Secret Diary of a Call Girl	4 episodes
2011–2013	Misfits	4 episodes
2013	Utopia	3 episodes
2015	Tatau	4 episodes
2016	Salem	Episode: "The Reckoning"
2016	Class	2 episodes: "Detained"; "The Metaphysical Engine, or What Quill Did"
2017	Imposters	2 episodes: "Frog-Bikini-Eiffel Tower"; "In the Game"
2017	Dirk Gently's Holistic Detective Agency	2 episodes: "This Is Not Miami"; "Little Guy, Black Hair"
2017	Doctor Who	2 episodes: "The Lie of the Land"; "Empress of Mars"
2017–2018	Preacher	4 episodes
2017–2019	Happy!	4 episodes
2018	Cloak & Dagger	Episode: "Colony Collapse"
2019	Doctor Who	Episode: "Resolution"
2019	Deadly Class	Episode: "Kids of the Black Hole"
2019	Into the Badlands	2 episodes
2019	Doom Patrol	Episode: "Frances Patrol"
2019	Treadstone	2 episodes
2020	Hunters	2 episodes: "The Mourner's Kaddish"; "While Visions of Safta Danced in His Head"
2021	The Wheel of Time	2 episodes: "A Place of Safety"; "The Dragon Reborn"
2022	The Lord of the Rings: The Rings of Power	4 episodes: "Adar"; "The Great Wave"; "Partings"; "Alloyed"
2024	Fallout	Episode: "The Beginning"
2025	Lazarus	2 episodes: "Episode 1"; "Episode 2"

=== Short films ===
Year	Title	Notes
2007	Happy Birthday Granddad	Co-written and directed with Alex Garcia Lopez
2008	Samantha	Co-written and directed with Alex Garcia Lopez
2008	Be Lucky	Co-written and directed with Alex Garcia Lopez
2009	Diego's Story	Co-written and directed with Alex Garcia Lopez
2015	Dark Clowns	
