= Shelter in Solitude =

2023 film by Vibeke Muasya

- Theatrical release poster
- Directed by: Vibeke Muasya
- Written by: Siobhan Fallon Hogan
- Produced by: Siobhan Fallon Hogan; Peter Hogan; Patrick Clifton; Erin Fraser; Robert Patrick
- Starring: Siobhan Fallon Hogan; Dan Castellaneta; Robert Patrick; Peter Macon; Peter Hogan; Robb Banks; Fat Nick
- Cinematography: Matthias Schubert
- Edited by: Sabine Emiliani
- Music by: Kyle Ward
- Production company: Emerald Caz Entertainment
- Distributed by: Foxglove Entertainment
- Release date: September 6, 2023 (Manlius)
- Running time: 93 minutes
- Country: United States
- Language: English

Shelter in Solitude is a 2023 American comedy-drama film directed by Vibeke Muasya and starring Siobhan Fallon Hogan, who also wrote the screenplay.

== Plot ==
The film is set during the initial stages of the COVID-19 pandemic, a time when quarantine measures and mask mandates were strictly enforced. The small town, already marked by its quiet and isolated nature, becomes even more secluded under lockdown. With her bar shut down, Val feels lost and purposeless. She decides to take up a job as a prison guard, a significant departure from her previous life. Her brother, a prison warden grappling with his own solitude due to a failing marriage, helps her secure this position. Val is assigned to guard Jackson, a prisoner facing the death penalty. Initially, their interactions are formal and distant, but as Val begins to show small acts of kindness—like baking cookies for Jackson and trying to make him laugh—a bond forms between them. Jackson, who has been starved of meaningful human interaction, begins to open up to Val. As their friendship deepens, Val learns about Jackson's past and the crime that led to his death sentence. Jackson had killed his daughter’s rapist in a fit of rage and despair. This revelation profoundly impacts Val, who sees Jackson not as a criminal, but as a father who acted out of love and protection for his child. Moved by Jackson's story, Val decides to use her connection to her brother and any means necessary to help Jackson reconnect with his estranged daughter before his execution. Despite the challenges, she manages to arrange a meeting between Jackson and his daughter on the day of his execution. The reunion is deeply emotional, filled with whispered apologies and declarations of love, highlighting the human capacity for forgiveness and understanding. In the film's poignant conclusion, Jackson faces his execution with a sense of peace, having reconciled with his daughter. Val, having witnessed this profound moment, gains a new perspective on her own life, realizing the importance of genuine human connections and the impact of kindness.

== Cast ==
- Siobhan Fallon Hogan as Valerie
- Dan Castellaneta as Sam
- Robert Patrick as Dwayne
- Peter Macon as Jackson Marcus
- Peter Hogan as Officer Chrissy
- Robb Banks as Perc Dealer
- Fat Nick as Freestyler
- Patricia Scanlon as Clara

== Production ==
Filming wrapped in Syracuse, New York in October 2021. Scenes were also shot in Cazenovia, New York and Erieville in September 2021. The film was shot in over sixteen days.

== Release ==
The film premiered at the Manlius Theater in Manlius, New York on September 6, 2023. It began a limited theatrical run in the U.S. on October 6, 2023.

== Reception ==
Film Threat's Perry Norton gave the film a rating of six out of 10, calling it "a charming indie [with] guts."

== Awards ==
The film received awards for Best Actress and Best Cinematography at the 2023 Boston International Film Festival.
