= Frederick E. O. Toye =

American television director, editor and producer

- Born: September 26, 1967 (age 59); Los Angeles, California
- Education: University of California, Santa Barbara
- Occupations: Television director, editor, producer
- Years active: 1989–present

Frederick E. O. Toye (born September 26, 1967) is an American television director and executive producer. Toye began his career as a production assistant for five years and an editor for 15 years, before becoming a television director. He is a frequent collaborator of J. J. Abrams. He has directed, edited, and produced several episodes of the ABC series Alias, as well as serving as a producer and director on the Fox science fiction series Fringe. In 2024, he won an Emmy Award for Outstanding Directing for his work on the first season of the FX series Shōgun.

He has also directed episodes of Lost, Ghost Whisperer, Brothers & Sisters, The 4400, Moonlight, V, CSI: NY, Chuck, The Good Wife, Falling Skies, Person of Interest, Fallout and other series.

== Early life and education ==
Toye attended the University of California, Santa Barbara and graduated with a B.A. He is a great-grandson of the opera singer Marguerite Namara.

== Career ==
Toye made the move into television directing after working for five years as a production assistant and a decade as an editor. This background in the editing room gave him a solid sense of how to tell a clear story, which helped considerably in his work on such complex series as Chuck (NBC 2007–12) and Fringe (Fox 2008–13). Los Angeles native Toye got his first screen credit working as a production assistant on Billy Crystal's 1989 HBO special Midnight Train to Moscow, before moving into visual effects on films like The Addams Family (1991) and then working as an assistant editor on hit films such as Forrest Gump (1994) and Men in Black (1997).

As a TV director, Toye cut his teeth on network TV action and sci-fi thrillers like Alias, Lost, and Fringe and has also worked on character-rich dramas such as The Good Wife. That experience running the gamut between drama genres served Toye well in recent years, directing episodes of genre series like Westworld, Snowpiercer, Watchmen and The Walking Dead. In 2024, his prolific output included The Boys and Fallout. The same year, Toye received acclaim for his work on Shōgun, helming four episodes of the Emmy-winning FX drama series, including season finale "A Dream of a Dream." The season's penultimate episode, "Crimson Sky," earned Toye his first-ever Emmy for outstanding directing, which was also Toye's first-ever career nomination in the category. Toye followed it up by directing the pilot episode of Prime Video’s prequel series The Terminal List: Dark Wolf, starring Chris Pratt and Taylor Kitsch. He set to direct the opening episodes of the Prime Video series Bloodaxe and God of War.

== Television work ==
- 11.22.63
  - episode 1.02 "The Kill Floor"
  - episode 1.04 "The Eyes of Texas"
- The 4400
  - episode 3.11 "The Gospel According to Collier"
- Alias
  - episode 4.13 "Tuesday"
  - episode 5.02 "...1..."
  - episode 5.04 "Mockingbird"
  - episode 5.13 "30 Seconds"
  - episode 5.16 "Reprisal"
- Almost Human
  - episode 1.12 "Beholder"
- American Gods
  - episode 2.02 "The Begulling Man"
- Believe
  - episode 1.12 "Second Chance"
- The Boys
  - episode 1.04 "The Female of the Species"
  - episode 2.04 "Nothing Like It in the World"
  - episode 4.03 "We'll Keep the Red Flag Flying Here"
- BrainDead
  - episode 1.06 "Notes Toward a Post-Reagan Theory of Party Alliance, Tribalism, and Loyalty: Past as Prologue"
  - episode 1.07 "The Power of Euphemism: How Torture Became a Matter of Debate in American Politics"
- Brothers & Sisters
  - episode 1.06 "For the Children"
  - episode 1.10 "Light the Lights"
- Chuck
  - episode 1.12 "Chuck Versus the Undercover Lover"
  - episode 3.05 "Chuck Versus the First Class"
  - episode 3.15 "Chuck Versus the Role Models"
  - episode 4.17 "Chuck Versus the First Bank of Evil"
  - episode 5.09 "Chuck Versus the Kept Man"
- CSI: Cyber
  - episode 2.13 "The Walking Dead"
- CSI: NY
  - episode 5.02 "Page Turner"
  - episode 7.15 "Vigilante"
  - episode 8.01 "Indelible"
- Designated Survivor
  - episode 1.07 "The Traitor"
  - episode 1.10 "The Oath"
  - episode 1.14 "Commander-in-Chief"
  - episode 1.17 "The Ninth Seat"
  - episode 1.21 "Brace for Impact"
  - episode 2.02 "Sting of the Tail"
- Evil
  - episode 1.09 "Exorcism Part 2"
- Falling Skies
  - episode 1.04 "Grace"
  - episode 1.05 "Silent Kill"
- Fallout
  - episode 1.06 "The Trap"
  - episode 1.07 "The Radio"
  - episode 2.01 "The Innovator"
  - episode 2.02 "The Golden Rule"
  - episode 2.08 "The Strip"
- Fringe
  - episode 1.03 "The Ghost Network"
  - episode 1.09 "The Dreamscape"
  - episode 1.11 "Bound"
  - episode 1.15 "Inner Child"
  - episode 1.19 "The Road Not Taken"
  - episode 2.11 "Unearthed"
  - episode 3.15 "Subject 13"
  - episode 4.16 "Nothing As It Seems"
- Ghost Whisperer
  - episode 2.04 "The Ghost Within"
  - episode 2.18 "Children of Ghosts"
  - episode 3.07 "Unhappy Medium"
  - episode 3.09 "All Ghosts Lead to Grandview"
  - episode 3.14 "The Gravesitter"
- The Good Fight
  - episode 2.07 "Day 450"
  - episode 3.02 "The One Inspired by Roy Cohn"
- The Good Wife
  - episode 1.22 "Hybristophilia"
  - episode 2.20 "Foreign Affairs"
  - episode 3.04 "Feeding the Rat"
  - episode 3.13 "Bitcoin for Dummies"
  - episode 3.14 "Another Ham Sandwich"
  - episode 4.05 "Waiting for the Knock"
  - episode 4.19 "The Wheels of Justice"
  - episode 5.07 "The Next Week"
  - episode 6.05 "Shiny Objects"
- Hawaii Five-0
  - episode 1.11 "Palekaiko"
  - episode 2.19 "Kalele"
  - episode 3.02 "Kanalua"
- Invasion
  - episode 1.16 "The Fittest"
- Lost
  - episode 3.18 "D.O.C."
- Lost in Space
  - episode 3.01 "Three Little Birds"
- The Man in the High Castle
  - episode 4.08 "Hitler Has Only Got One Ball"
- Melrose Place
  - episode 1.04 "Vine"
- Miami Medical
  - episode 1.12 "Down to the Bone"
- Moonlight
  - episode 1.02 "Out of the Past"
  - episode 1.04 "Fever"
  - episode 1.16 "Sonata"
- Mrs. Davis
  - episode 1.07 "Great Gatsby 2001: A Space Odyssey"
- NCIS: New Orleans
  - episode 2.13 "Undocumented"
- Person of Interest
  - episode 1.07 "Witness"
  - episode 1.21 "Many Happy Returns"
  - episode 2.07 "Critical"
  - episode 2.15 "Booked Solid"
  - episode 3.02 "Nothing to Hide"
  - episode 3.09 "The Crossing"
  - episode 3.21 "Beta"
  - episode 4.03 "Wingman"
  - episode 4.16 "Blunt"
  - episode 4.21 "Asylum"
  - episode 5.10 "The Day the World Went Away"
- Revolution
  - episode 1.10 "Nobody's Fault But Mine"
  - episode 1.19 "Children of Men"
  - episode 2.05 "One Riot, One Ranger"
  - episode 2.17 "Why We Fight"
- Rizzoli & Isles
  - episode 2.09 "Gone Daddy Gone"
  - episode 3.07 "Crazy for You"
- See
  - episode 1.07 "The Lavender Road"
- Shōgun
  - episode 1.04 "The Eightfold Fence"
  - episode 1.05 "Broken to the Fist"
  - episode 1.09 "Crimson Sky"
  - episode 1.10 "A Dream of a Dream"
- Snowpiercer
  - episode 1.04 "Without Their Maker"
  - episode 1.05 "Justice Never Boarded"
- Stalker
  - episode 1.08 "Skin"
  - episode 1.18 "The Woods"
- The Terminal List
  - episode 1.04 "Detachment"
  - episode 1.07 "Extinction"
- The Terminal List: Dark Wolf
  - episode 1.01 "Inherent Resolve"
  - episode 1.02 "The Audition"
- The Terror
  - episode 2.09 "Come and Get Me:
  - episode 2.10 "Into the Afterlife"
- Truth Be Told
  - episode 2.07 "Lanterman-Petris-Short"
  - episode 3.07 "The Luxury in Self-Reproach"
  - episode 3.08 "Darkness Steals the Glory of Light"
- Undercovers
  - episode 1.09 "A Night to Forget"
- V
  - episode 1.03 "A Bright New Day"
  - episode 1.09 "Heretic's Fork"
- Vegas
  - episode 1.13 "Road Trip"
- The Walking Dead
  - episode 11.03 "Hunted"
  - episode 11.04 "Rendition"
- Watchmen
  - episode 1.09 "See How They Fly"
- Westworld
  - episode 1.06 "The Adversary"
  - episode 1.07 "Trompe L'Oeil"
  - episode 2.10 "The Passenger"
