= Rushed =

2021 film by Vibeke Muasya

- Theatrical release poster
- Directed by: Vibeke Muasya
- Written by: Siobhan Fallon Hogan
- Produced by: Siobhan Fallon Hogan; Peter Hogan; Patrick Clifton; Erin Fraser; Robert Patrick
- Starring: Siobhan Fallon Hogan; Robert Patrick
- Cinematography: Matthias Schubert
- Edited by: Sabine Emiliani
- Music by: Kristian Eidnes Andersen
- Production companies: Emerald Caz Productions; Zentropa Films
- Distributed by: Vertical Entertainment
- Release date: August 27, 2021
- Running time: 101 minutes
- Country: United States
- Languages: English; Spanish

Rushed (also known as A Mother's Fury in the United Kingdom) is a 2021 American thriller film directed by Vibeke Muasya. It stars Siobhan Fallon Hogan (who also wrote the screenplay and served as a co-producer) and Robert Patrick.

== Plot ==
Jimmy O'Brien is a quiet college freshman experiencing regular fraternity hazing, unbeknownst to his overbearing Irish-Catholic mother, Barbara. One night after being forced to drink excessive amounts of alcohol, Jimmy ends up in a coma and, eventually, his family make the difficult decision to take him off life support.

Shortly after, they receive a letter from the college who advise they will not accept any liability for Jimmy's death. Directionless and depressed, Barbara initially spends her days at home in New York chain-smoking and writing angry e-mails to the college principal, causing distance between herself and her three other children.

One day after reading other mothers' stories online about their sons dying following hazing incidents, Barbara decides to begin travelling around the country to interview them, hoping to bring awareness to the matter with the possibility of getting help from her husband Jim's friend Bob Daley, a senator from Washington DC.

After weeks of not hearing back from Bob, Barbara attends one of his fundraisers uninvited. Much to her shock, she witnesses his speech, during which talks about the "brotherhood" of college fraternities and downplays the recent hazing incidents. When she interrupts, Bob tries to quickly dismiss the importance of Jimmy's death, and Barbara walks out. Losing faith, she calls Jimmy's cell phone and leaves him a voicemail, apologising for not being able to change the legislation.

Jim calls Barbara while she is driving home and tells her he has received a photograph of Jimmy from the night of his death, showing that he was tied up and urinated on while being made to drink. Barbara turns her car around and stops at a gas station to buy alcohol before heading to an armory. She also books a stay at a secluded cottage for the night.

The next morning, Barbara calls Steven Croission, the main instigator of Jimmy's hazing, and tells him she would like to meet him to gift the fraternity a cheque in Jimmy's honour, which he agrees to. She lures him into her car and pulls a gun on him before driving him back to the cottage. She ties him up and begins taunting him like he did to Jimmy, while he begs for his life. She then forces him to call his mom and tell her he killed Jimmy. The line then goes quiet before a gunshot is heard.

Barbara attempts to return to normal life but later hands herself into the local police. At her trial, it is revealed that she did not shoot Steven; she tells the prosecutor she just wanted to mess with him. She says she could never do that to another mother, because to know your son is dead is unbearable.

== Cast ==
- Siobhan Fallon Hogan as Barbara O'Brien
- Robert Patrick as Jim O'Brien
- Jake Weary as Steven Croission
- Jay Jay Warren as Jimmy O'Brien
- Justin Linville as Vergil
- Peri Gilpin as Mrs. Donohue
- Brian O'Halloran as Parish Priest

== Production ==
Hogan was inspired to write the film and give herself a lead role after initially contemplating a return to theatre: "Every time I had a lull in my career, I would write a one-woman show ... About three years ago my youngest [daughter] was heading off to college and I thought, 'I am sick of myself; I can't bear to do another one-woman show. I have been in so many movies [that] maybe I can write one.' So I gave it a whirl."

Scenes were shot in Hogan's home in New Jersey. The last two days of filming occurred in Central New York. Ellen Cleghorne filmed scenes as the school principal, but they were cut.

== Release ==
It was announced that Vertical Entertainment acquired North American distribution rights to the film in June 2021. The film was released in select theaters on August 27, 2021.

== Reception ==
The film holds a 90% rating on review aggregator Rotten Tomatoes, based on 10 reviews.

Film Threat's Andrew Stover gave the film a score of seven out of 10, believing it to be "a well-acted thriller that is surprising and sensible." Peter Gray of The AU Review called it "tender [yet] furious ... free of cheap thrills and heavy on emotion." Particular praise was given to Hogan, with Valerie Kalfrin of the Alliance of Women Film Journalists writing, "[she] infuses Barbara with such lived-in certainty that her performance is the strongest reason to watch Rushed." Meanwhile, Leslie Felperin stated in her review for The Guardian, "Few actors would have been able to pull this off like Hogan, who is not only the star but also the film's screenwriter and producer. She's one of those "who-is-that-again?" character actors you've seen hundreds of times before in all sorts of films ... she is ordinary looking but also radiant, a force of nature in a fringed buckskin coat. [The director] just rolls with it and lets Hogan steer the ship."
