= Doctor Who =

British science fiction TV series (1963–2025)

- Title card introduced in 2024
- Genre: Science fiction; Adventure; Drama
- Created by: Sydney Newman; C. E. Webber; Donald Wilson
- Showrunner: Various
- Written by: Various
- Starring: Various cast members, as the Doctor and companions
- Theme music composer: Ron Grainer
- Opening theme: Doctor Who theme music
- Composer: Various
- Country of origin: United Kingdom
- Original language: English
- No. of seasons: 26 (1963–1989)
- No. of series: 15 (2005–2025)
- No. of episodes: 892 (95 missing); 319 stories; (list of episodes)

Production
- Executive producer: Various
- Camera setup: Multi-camera (1963–1989); Single-camera (1996, 2005–2025)
- Running time: 18–90 minutes: 18–29 mins (1963–1984, 1986–1989) (Note: Some special episodes have a running time of up to 90 minutes.); 44–46 mins (1984, 1985); 85–89 mins (1996) (Note: The 1996 television film has a running time in NTSC regions of 89 minutes. In PAL regions, the film is affected by PAL speedup, shortening the running time to 85 minutes.); 41–76 mins (2005–2025)
- Production companies: Various: BBC Television (1963–1989); BBC Worldwide (1996); Universal Television (1996); BBC Wales (2005–2017); BBC Studios Productions (2016–2025); Bad Wolf (2023–2025)

Original release
- Network: BBC1 (Note: Known as BBC TV until 1964)
- Release: 23 November 1963 – 6 December 1989
- Network: Fox / BBC1 (Note: The 1996 television film premiered on the Canadian station CITV-DT on 12 May 1996.)
- Release: 14 May 1996 / 27 May 1996
- Network: BBC One (Note: From 2024 to 2025, most new episodes were released online on BBC iPlayer ahead of their television broadcast on BBC One.)
- Release: 26 March 2005 – 31 May 2025
- Network: Disney+ (Note: Excluding the United Kingdom and Ireland.)
- Release: 25 November 2023 – 31 May 2025

Related
- Whoniverse

Doctor Who is a British science fiction television series first broadcast by the BBC in 1963. The series, created by Sydney Newman, C. E. Webber and Donald Wilson, follows the adventures of the Doctor, an extraterrestrial being from a humanoid species known as Time Lords. The Doctor travels through space and time using a time travelling spaceship called the TARDIS, which has an exterior that resembles a British police box. The Doctor encounters various civilisations, which they seek to protect by outwitting foes and solving crises. The Doctor usually travels with a companion.

Beginning with William Hartnell, fourteen actors have headlined the series as the Doctor; the most recent being Ncuti Gatwa, who portrayed the Fifteenth Doctor from 2023 to 2025. The transition between actors is woven into the story via the plot device of regeneration. When a Time Lord is fatally injured or weakened by old age, their cells regenerate into a new body; while they retain their memories, their personality changes. The different portrayals function as distinct stages within a single, continuous narrative. Due to time travel, these different incarnations occasionally cross paths.

A British popular culture staple with a global cult following, the show has shaped generations of British television professionals. Fans of the series are sometimes referred to as Whovians. The series has been listed in Guinness World Records as the longest-running science-fiction television series in the world, as well as the "most successful" science-fiction series of all time, based on its overall broadcast ratings, DVD and book sales.

The series originally ran from 1963 to 1989. There was an unsuccessful attempt to revive regular production in 1996 with a backdoor pilot in the form of a television film titled Doctor Who. The series was relaunched in 2005, with production moving to BBC Wales in Cardiff. Since 2016, the show has been produced or co-produced by BBC Studios Productions in Cardiff. (Note: Co-produced by BBC Wales and BBC Studios Productions in 2016–2017, and BBC Studios Productions alone from 2018–2022, after the BBC's commercial production and BBC Worldwide were repurposed into BBC Studios in 2018. Co-produced by BBC Studios Productions and Bad Wolf from 2023–2025.) Since 2026, the series has been pending an invitation to tender for future episodes. The Doctor Who franchise, or Whoniverse, spans a wide range of media, including television spin-offs, literature, audio dramas, and films. As a global cultural phenomenon, it has become one of the most frequently referenced and parodied series in television history.

== Premise ==
Doctor Who follows the adventures of the title character, a rogue Time Lord who goes by the name "the Doctor". The Doctor fled Gallifrey, the planet of the Time Lords, in a stolen TARDIS ("Time and Relative Dimension(s) in Space"), a time machine that travels by materialising into, and dematerialising out of, the time vortex. The TARDIS has a vast interior but appears smaller on the outside, and is equipped with a "chameleon circuit" intended to make the machine take on the appearance of local objects as a disguise. Because of a malfunction, the Doctor's TARDIS remains fixed as a blue British police box.

Across time and space, the Doctor, using only ingenuity and minimal resources, such as the versatile sonic screwdriver, is drawn into crises in which they oppose dangerous adversaries, seeking to protect civilisations, while also navigating situations that present complex moral decisions. The Doctor rarely travels alone and is often joined by one or more companions on these adventures; these companions are usually humans, owing to the Doctor's fascination with planet Earth, which also leads to frequent collaborations with the international military task force UNIT when Earth is threatened. The Doctor is centuries old and, as a Time Lord, can regenerate when there is mortal damage to their body or when their body is weakened from old age. The Doctor's various incarnations have gained numerous recurring enemies during their travels, including the Daleks, their creator Davros, the Cybermen, and the renegade Time Lord the Master.

== History ==
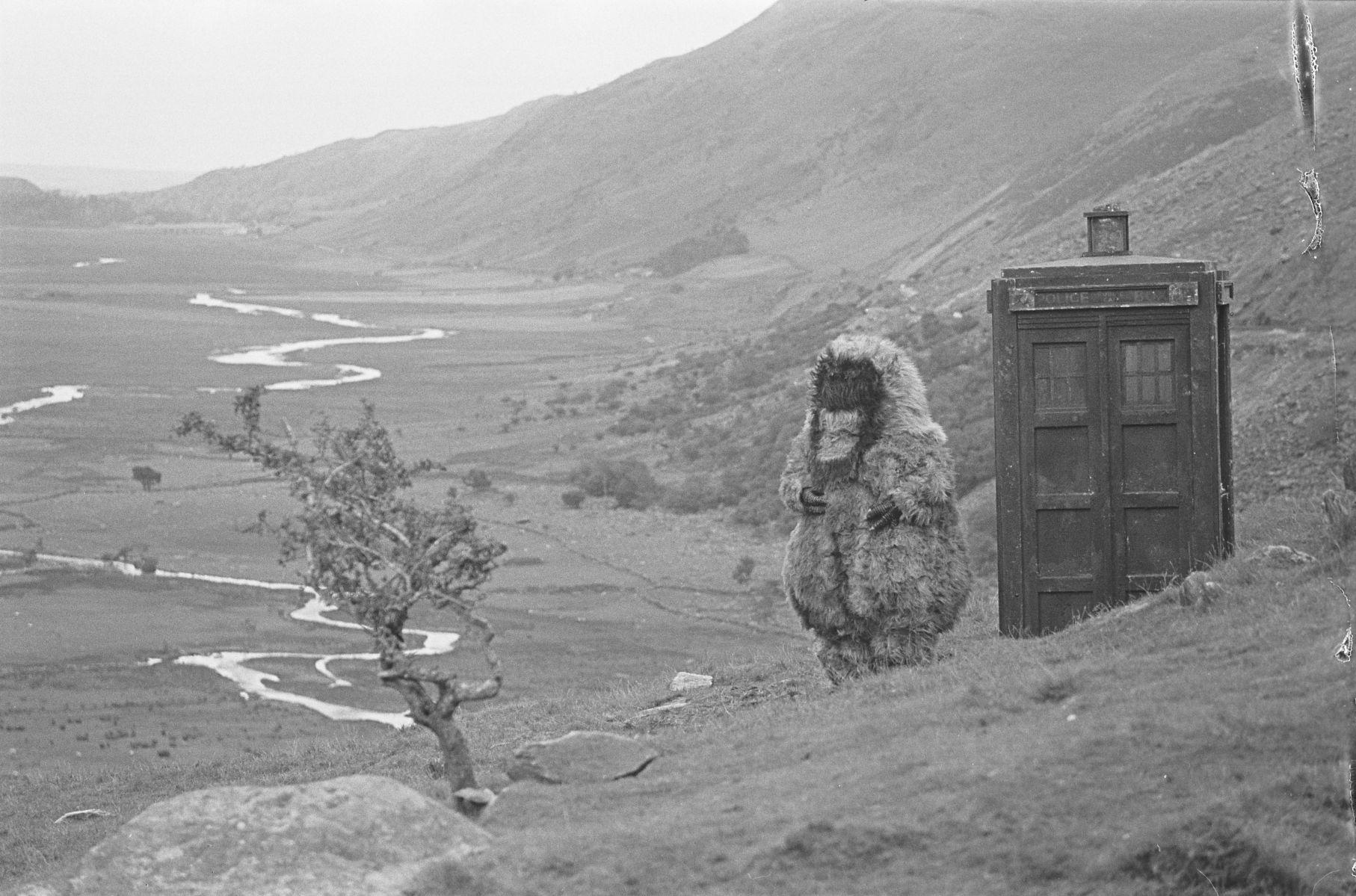
Filming The Abominable Snowmen serial, which is now mostly missing, at Nant Ffrancon, Wales in 1967

Doctor Who was originally intended to appeal to a family audience as an educational programme using time travel as a means to explore scientific ideas and famous moments in history. The programme first appeared on the BBC Television Service at 17:16:20 GMT on 23 November 1963; this was eighty seconds later than the scheduled programme time, because of announcements concerning the previous day's assassination of John F. Kennedy. It was to be a regular weekly programme, each episode 25 minutes of transmission length. Discussions and plans for the programme had been in progress for a year. Sydney Newman, the head of drama, was mainly responsible for developing the programme, with the first format document for the series being written by Newman along with the head of the script department (later head of serials) Donald Wilson and staff writer C. E. Webber; in a 1971 interview, Wilson claimed to have named the series, and when this claim was put to Newman, he did not dispute it. Writer Anthony Coburn, story editor David Whitaker and initial producer Verity Lambert also heavily contributed to the development of the series. (Note: Newman is often given sole creator credit for the series. Some reference works such as The Complete Encyclopedia of Television Programs 1947–1979 by Vincent Terrace, erroneously credit Terry Nation with creating Doctor Who because of the way his name is credited in the two Peter Cushing films.)

On 31 July 1963, Whitaker commissioned Terry Nation to write a story under the title The Mutants. As originally written, the Daleks and Thals were the victims of an alien neutron bomb attack, but Nation later dropped the aliens and made the Daleks the aggressors. When the script was presented to Wilson, it was immediately rejected as the programme was not permitted to contain any "bug-eyed monsters". According to Lambert, "We didn't have a lot of choice—we only had the Dalek serial to go ... We had a bit of a crisis of confidence because Donald [Wilson] was so adamant that we shouldn't make it. Had we had anything else ready we would have made that." Nation's script became the second Doctor Who serial – The Daleks (also known as The Mutants). The serial introduced the eponymous aliens that would become the series' most popular monsters, dubbed "Dalekmania", and was responsible for the BBC's first merchandising boom.

We had to rely on the story because there was little we could do with the effects. Star Wars in a way was the turning point. Once Star Wars had happened, Doctor Who effectively was out of date from that moment on really, judged by that level of technological expertise.

— Philip Hinchcliffe, producer of Doctor Who from 1974 to 1977, on why the original series eventually fell behind other science fiction in production values and reputation, leading to its cancellation

The BBC drama department produced the programme for 26 seasons, broadcast on BBC One. Due to his increasingly poor health, William Hartnell, the first actor to play the Doctor, was succeeded by Patrick Troughton in 1966. In 1970, Jon Pertwee replaced Troughton and the series began production in colour. In 1974, Tom Baker was cast as the Doctor. His eccentric personality became hugely popular, with viewing figures for the series returning to a level not seen since the height of "Dalekmania" a decade earlier. After seven years in the role, Baker was replaced by Peter Davison in 1981, and Colin Baker replaced Davison in 1984. In 1985, the channel's controller Michael Grade cancelled the upcoming twenty-third season, forcing the series into an eighteen-month hiatus. In 1986, the series was recommissioned on the condition that Baker left the role of the Doctor, which was recast to Sylvester McCoy in 1987. Falling viewing numbers, a decline in the public perception of the series and a less-prominent transmission slot saw production ended in 1989 by Peter Cregeen, the BBC's new head of series. Although it was effectively cancelled, the BBC repeatedly affirmed over several years that the series would return.

While in-house production concluded, the BBC explored an independent production company to relaunch the series. Philip Segal, a British expatriate who worked for Columbia Pictures' television arm in the United States, had approached the BBC as early as July 1989, while the 26th season was still in production. Segal's negotiations eventually led to a Doctor Who television film as a pilot for an American series, broadcast on the Fox Network in 1996, as an international co-production between Fox, Universal Pictures, the BBC and BBC Worldwide. Starring Paul McGann as the Doctor, the film was successful in the UK (with more than 9 million viewers), but was less so in the United States and did not lead to a series.

Licensed media such as novels and audio plays provided new stories, but as a television programme, Doctor Who remained dormant. In September 2003, BBC Television announced the in-house production of a new series, after several years of attempts by BBC Worldwide to find backing for a feature film version. The 2005 revival of Doctor Who is a direct plot continuation of the original 1963–1989 series and the 1996 television film Doctor Who. The executive producers of the new incarnation of the series were Queer as Folk writer Russell T Davies and BBC Cymru Wales head of drama Julie Gardner. From 2005, the series switched from a multi-camera to a single-camera setup.

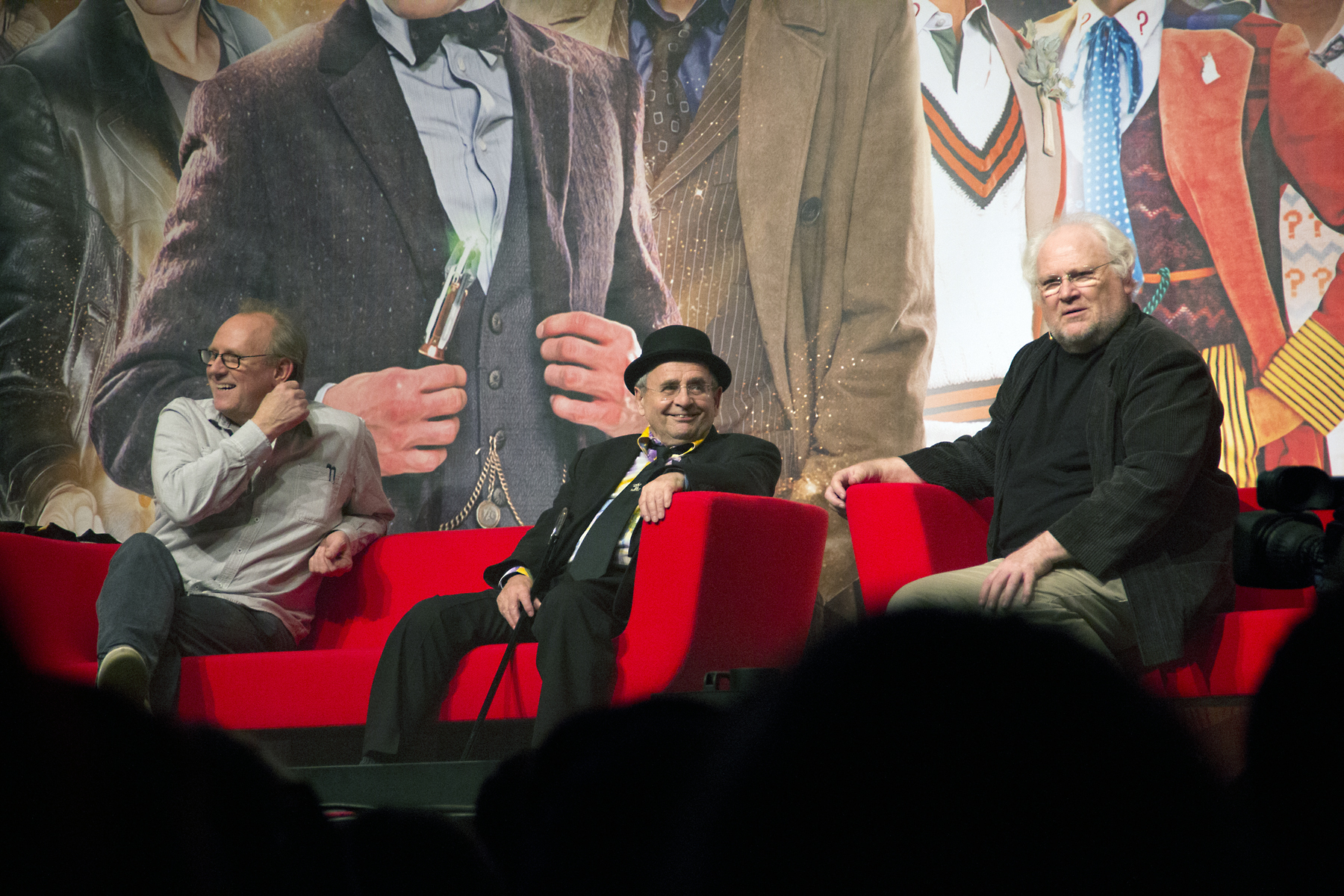
The 50th anniversary of Doctor Who convention, held over three days at the ExCeL London in November 2013, included an appearance of three former Doctors: pictured left to right: Peter Davison, Sylvester McCoy and Colin Baker.

Starring Christopher Eccleston as the Doctor, Doctor Who returned with the episode "Rose" on BBC One on 26 March 2005, after a 16-year hiatus of in-house production. Eccleston left after one series and was replaced by David Tennant. Davies left the production team in 2009. Steven Moffat, a writer under Davies, was announced as his successor the year before; Matt Smith was announced as the new Doctor in January 2009. Smith decided to leave the role of the Doctor in 2013, the 50th anniversary year. He was replaced by Peter Capaldi.

In January 2016, Moffat announced that he would step down after the 2017 finale, to be replaced by Chris Chibnall in 2018. A 2017 Christmas special with Capaldi's Doctor, "Twice Upon a Time", was made before the handover to Chibnall; it was not a part of Moffat's initial plans in 2016. Jodie Whittaker, the first female Doctor, appeared in three series, the last of which was shortened due to the COVID-19 pandemic.

Both Whittaker and Chibnall announced that they would depart the series after a series of specials in 2022. Davies returned as showrunner from the 60th anniversary specials in 2023. Bad Wolf co-produced the series in partnership with BBC Studios Productions; from 2022 to 2025, Disney supported global distribution of the show as part of a 26-episode agreement that included both Doctor Who and the spin-off miniseries The War Between the Land and the Sea (2025). Bad Wolf's involvement saw Gardner return to the series alongside Davies and Jane Tranter, who recommissioned the series in 2005.

David Tennant returned to the role for the 60th anniversary specials, and Ncuti Gatwa played the Doctor for two series between 2023 and 2025. A Christmas special, to be written by Davies but without Disney's involvement, was announced in 2025, but was cancelled by June 2026 before a script was written, with Davies announcing his departure at the same time. The BBC committed to the future of Doctor Who, announcing plans to put the show out to competitive tender later in 2026. Media commentators anticipated that the programme would return in 2028 at the earliest, due to the timescales associated with the tender process.

=== Public consciousness ===
It has been claimed that the transmission of the first episode was delayed by ten minutes due to extended news coverage of the assassination of US President John F. Kennedy the previous day; in fact, it went out after a delay of eighty seconds. The BBC believed that coverage of the assassination, as well as a series of power blackouts across the country, had caused many viewers to miss this introduction to a new series, and it was broadcast again on 30 November 1963, just before episode two.

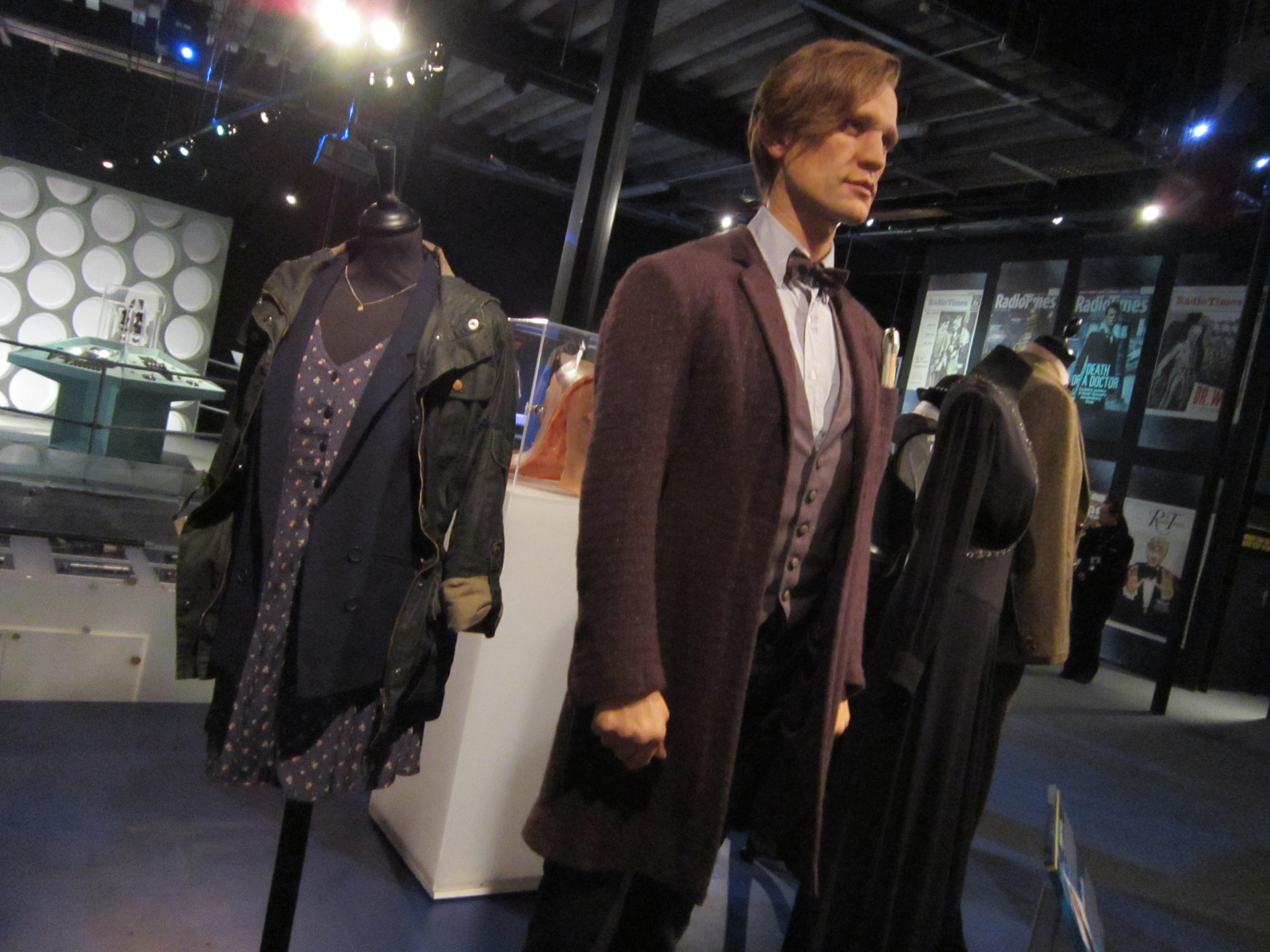
The Doctor Who Experience in Cardiff. The programme's broad appeal attracts audiences of children and families as well as science fiction fans.

The programme soon became a national institution in the United Kingdom, with a large following among the general viewing audience. The show received controversy over the suitability of the series for children. Morality campaigner Mary Whitehouse repeatedly complained to the BBC over what she saw as the programme's violent, frightening and gory content. According to Radio Times, the series "never had a more implacable foe than Mary Whitehouse".

A BBC audience research survey conducted in 1972 found that, by their own definition of violence ("any act[s] which may cause physical and/or psychological injury, hurt or death to persons, animals or property, whether intentional or accidental"), Doctor Who was the most violent of the drama programmes the corporation produced at the time. The same report found that 3% of the surveyed audience believed the series was "very unsuitable" for family viewing. Responding to the findings of the survey in The Times newspaper, journalist Philip Howard maintained that, "to compare the violence of Dr Who, sired by a horse-laugh out of a nightmare, with the more realistic violence of other television series, where actors who look like human beings bleed paint that looks like blood, is like comparing Monopoly with the property market in London: both are fantasies, but one is meant to be taken seriously."

During Jon Pertwee's second season as the Doctor, in the serial Terror of the Autons (1971), images of murderous plastic dolls, daffodils killing unsuspecting victims, and blank-featured policemen marked the apex of the series' ability to frighten children. Other notable moments in that decade include a disembodied brain falling to the floor in The Brain of Morbius and the Doctor apparently being drowned by a villain in The Deadly Assassin (both 1976). Mary Whitehouse's complaint about the latter incident prompted a change in BBC policy towards the series, with much tighter controls imposed on the production team, and the series' next producer, Graham Williams, was under a directive to take out "anything graphic in the depiction of violence". John Nathan-Turner produced the series during the 1980s and said in the documentary More Than Thirty Years in the TARDIS that he looked forward to Whitehouse's comments because the ratings of the series would increase soon after she had made them. Nathan-Turner also got into trouble with BBC executives over the violence he allowed to be depicted for season 22 of the series in 1985, which was publicly criticised by controller Michael Grade and given as one of his reasons for suspending the series for 18 months.

The phrase "hiding behind the sofa" (or "watching from behind the sofa") entered British pop culture, signifying the stereotypical behaviour of children who wanted to avoid seeing frightening parts of a television program while remaining in the room to watch the remainder of it. The phrase retains this association with Doctor Who. The Economist presented "hiding behind the sofa whenever the Daleks appear" as a British cultural institution on a par with Bovril and tea-time. Paul Parsons, author of The Science of Doctor Who, explains the appeal of hiding behind the sofa as the activation of the fear response in the amygdala in conjunction with reassurances of safety from the brain's frontal lobe. A 2011 online vote at Digital Spy deemed the series the "scariest TV show of all time". io9 placed this childhood juxtaposition of fear and thrill "at the center of many people's relationship with the series".

The original series has been retrospectively poked fun at by commentators for its low budget and resulting technical limitations, commonly citing "wobbly sets" and "monsters made with bubble wrap". (Note: Multiple sources: The Guardian, 2005: "Wobbly sets, quirky costumes and shrieking female sidekicks are out in the new series..."; New Statesman, 2017: "The original version of the show, which ran from 1963 to 1989, may have been known for its wobbly sets and aliens made of painted bubble wrap."; Engadget, 2023: "The 1963–1989 run was made on a shoestring, leading to lazy gags about wobbly sets and bad visual effects. [...] For all those wobbly sets and dodgy effects, Doctor Who is a writer's and actor's medium first; great writing and acting can go a long way. It can make you believe an alien parasite consuming a person inside out is real, and not just green bubble wrap."; Radio Times, 2025: "It was 16 years on from the BBC's original cancellation of the show, which to most of the world was a distant memory of wobbly sets and Daleks foiled by stairs. In 2005, TV was on a different planet. Could a series about a time-travelling alien in a police box really work in the era of The Sopranos and The Wire?"; The Guardian, 2025: "Since 2023 the show has been co-produced by Bad Wolf and BBC Studios, and has been distributed internationally by Disney+, in a deal which dramatically enhanced the budget for a series that during the 1970s had a reputation for wobbly sets, primitive VFX and monsters made with bubble wrap."; The Daily Telegraph, 2026: "Classic Who was all about great writing, riveting acting – and cheesy monsters cobbled together from whatever materials were to hand") Some, however, have noted that the limited funding was not to the detriment of the show's appeal. io9 wrote children did not see the flaws "of the dodgy monsters, of the silly effects, of the campy perils." The Daily Telegraph commented that "It's a worthwhile reminder that the series never relied on whizz-bang effects. Classic Who was all about great writing, riveting acting [...]". Engadget echoed this by saying these aspects "can make you believe an alien parasite consuming a person inside out is real, and not just green bubble wrap." Director Peter Hoar said of the original series: "I could tell they didn't have money, but I was able to compartmentalise and enjoy the ride knowing that the sets wobbled."

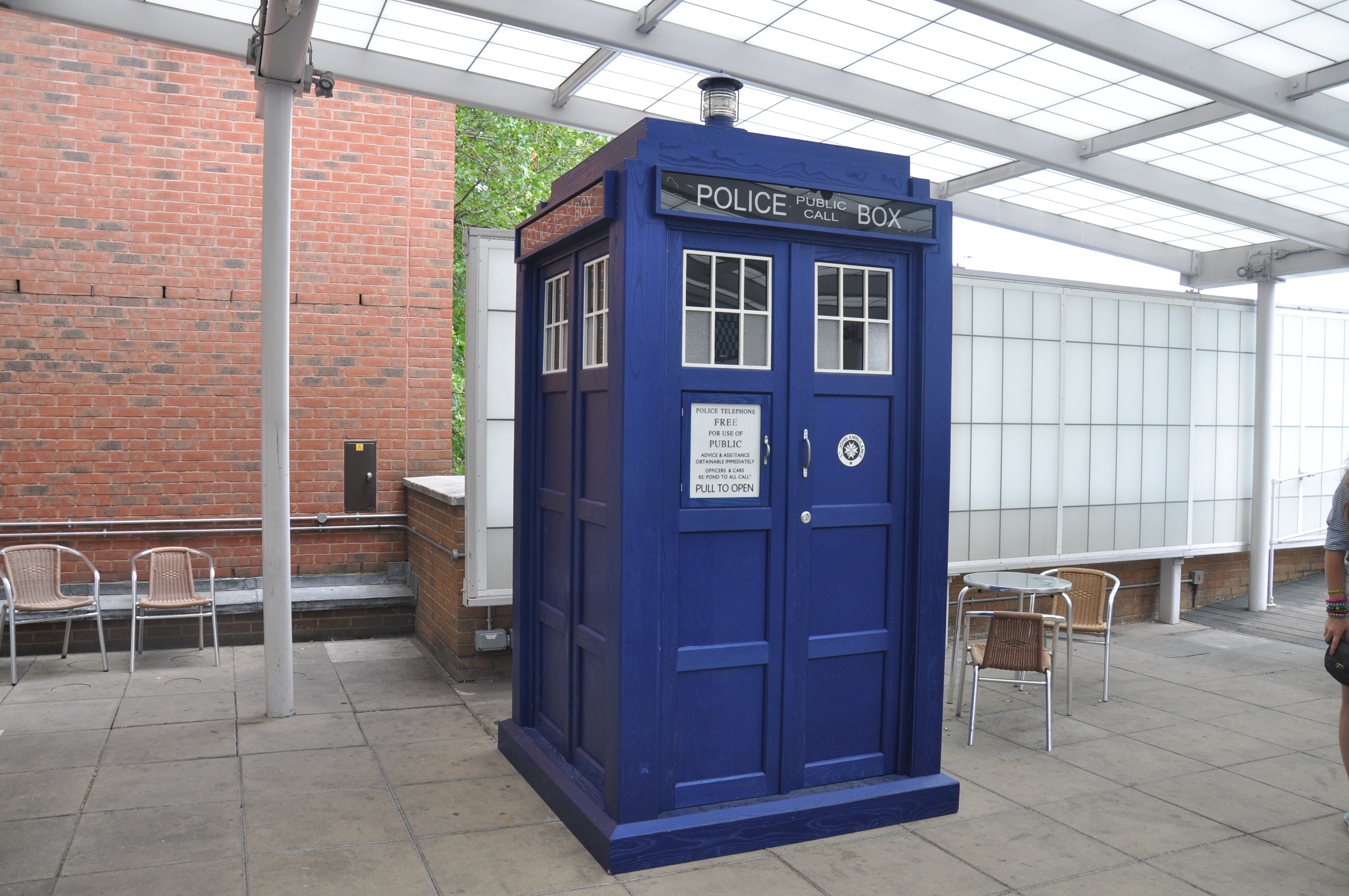
The TARDIS prop used between 2010 and 2017 in front of the BBC Television Centre

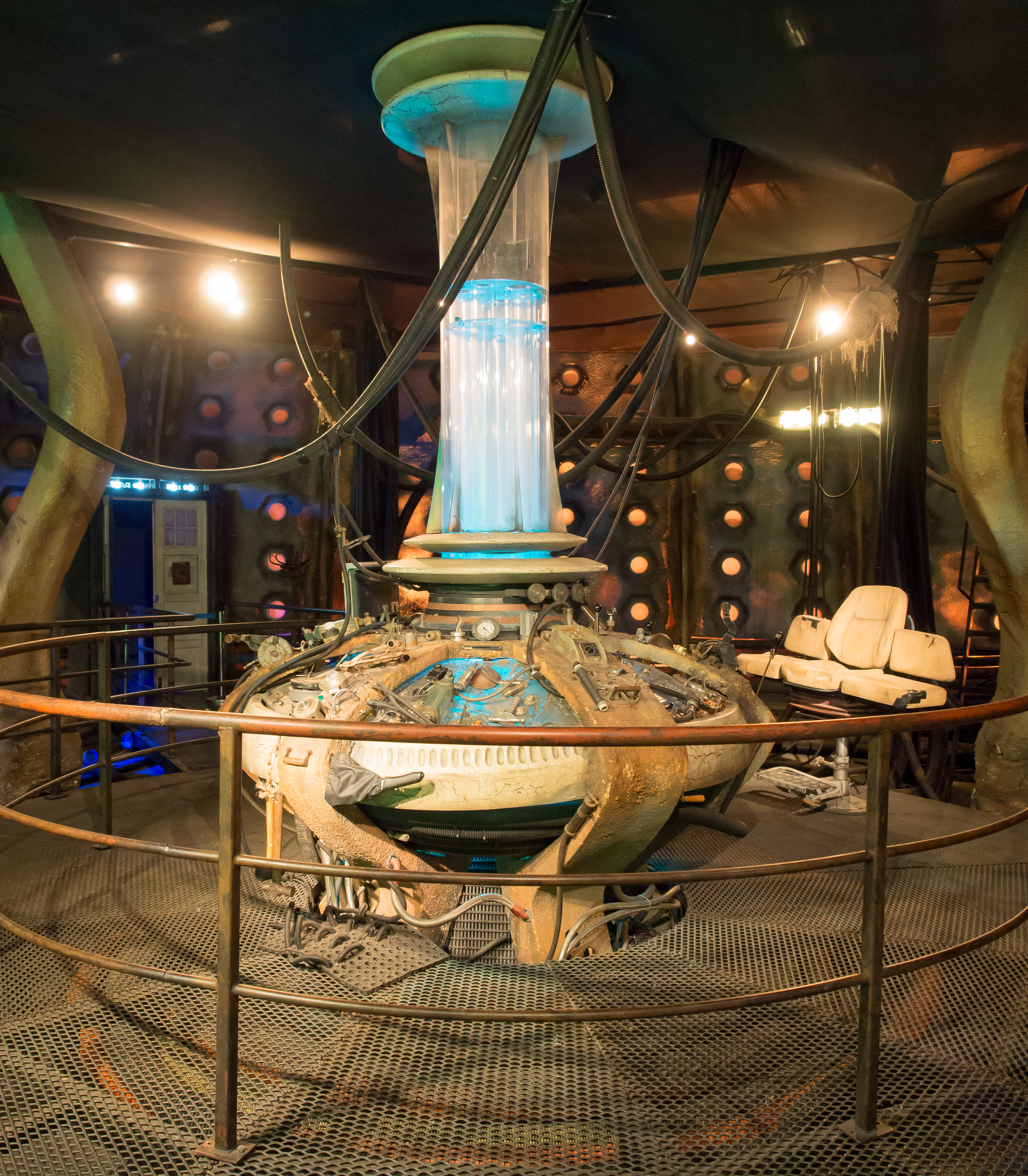
TARDIS interior (2005–2010) at the Doctor Who Experience, London Olympia

The image of the TARDIS has become firmly linked to the series in the public's consciousness; BBC scriptwriter Anthony Coburn, who lived in the resort of Herne Bay, Kent, was one of the people who conceived the idea of a police box as a time machine. In 1996, the BBC applied for a trademark to use the TARDIS' blue police box design in merchandising associated with Doctor Who. In 1998, the Metropolitan Police Authority filed an objection to the trademark claim; but in 2002, the Patent Office ruled in favour of the BBC.

The 21st-century revival of the programme became the centrepiece of BBC One's Saturday schedule and "defined the channel". Many renowned actors have made guest-starring appearances in various stories including Kylie Minogue, and Sir Ian McKellen. The revival of Doctor Who had consistently received high ratings by 2009, both in number of viewers and as measured by the Appreciation Index. In 2007, Caitlin Moran, television reviewer for The Times, wrote that Doctor Who is "quintessential to being British". According to Steven Moffat, the American film director Steven Spielberg has commented that "the world would be a poorer place without Doctor Who".

On 4 August 2013, a live programme titled Doctor Who Live: The Next Doctor was broadcast on BBC One, during which the actor who was going to play the Twelfth Doctor was revealed. The live show was watched by an average of 6.27 million in the UK, and was also simulcast in the United States, Canada and Australia.

== Episodes ==
Doctor Who originally ran for 26 seasons on BBC One, from 23 November 1963 until 6 December 1989. During the original run, each weekly episode formed part of a story (or "serial"), usually, but not always, of four to seven parts in the 1960s and early 1970s, four to six parts in the mid-to-late 1970s, and two to four parts in the 1980s. Occasionally, serials were loosely connected by a story line, such as season 8 focusing on the Doctor battling a rogue Time Lord called the Master, season 16's quest for the Key to Time, season 18's journey through E-Space and the theme of entropy, and season 20's Black Guardian trilogy.

The programme was intended to be educational and for family viewing on the early Saturday evening schedule. It initially alternated stories set in the past, which taught younger audience members about history, and with those in the future or outer space, focusing on science. This was also reflected in the Doctor's original companions, one of whom was a science teacher and another a history teacher.

However, science fiction stories came to dominate the programme, and the history-oriented episodes, which were not popular with the production team, were dropped after The Highlanders (1967). While the show continued to use historical settings, they were generally used as a backdrop for science fiction tales, with one exception: Black Orchid (1982), set in 1920s England. Beginning with the 2023 Christmas special "The Church on Ruby Road" and the 2024 season, the show started gearing more towards fantasy elements, while still keeping a harder science fiction format in episodes like "Boom".

The early stories were serialised in nature, with the narrative of one story flowing into the next and each episode having its own title, although produced as distinct stories with their own production codes. Following The Gunfighters (1966), however, each serial was given its own title, and the individual parts were assigned episode numbers.

Of the programme's many writers, Robert Holmes was the most prolific, while Douglas Adams became the best known outside Doctor Who itself, due to the popularity of his Hitchhiker's Guide to the Galaxy works.

The serial format changed for the 2005 revival, with what was now called a series usually consisting of 45-minute, self-contained episodes (50–60 minutes during series 11–13) and an extended 60-minute episode broadcast on either Christmas Day or New Year's Day; on a single occasion (during a year with no regular series with weekly episodes), the two-parter "The End of Time" took up the slot of both a Christmas and a 75-minute New Year's Day episode. The episodes in each series are often linked with a loose story arc resolved in the series finale. As of 2025, the only exception to this has been the serialised storyline of series 13, also known as its subtitle Flux. As in the first three years of the "classic" era, each episode (except for "The End of Time" Parts One and Two and "Spyfall" Parts One and Two) has its own title, whether stand-alone or part of a larger story. Occasionally, regular-series episodes will exceed the 45-minute run time; for example, the episodes "Journey's End" (2008) and "The Eleventh Hour" (2010) were longer than an hour.

892 Doctor Who instalments have been televised since 1963, ranging between 25-minute episodes (the most common format for the original series), 45/50-minute episodes (for Resurrection of the Daleks in the 1984 series, a single season in 1985, and the most common format for the revival era since 2005), two feature-length productions (1983's "The Five Doctors" and the 1996 television film), 15 Christmas specials (most of approximately 60 minutes' duration, one of 72 minutes), four New Year's specials ranging from 60 to 75 minutes, and eight additional specials ranging from 48 to 90 minutes in 2009, 2013, 2022, and 2023. Six mini-episodes, running from four to eight minutes each, were also produced for the 1993, 2005, 2007, 2012, and 2023 Children in Need charity appeals, while further mini-episodes were produced in 2008, 2010, 2013, and 2024 for Doctor Who–themed editions of The Proms. The 1993 two-part story, entitled Dimensions in Time, was made in collaboration with the cast of the BBC soap opera EastEnders and was filmed partly on the EastEnders set. A two-part mini-episode was also produced for the 2011 edition of Comic Relief. Starting with the 2009 special "Planet of the Dead", the series was filmed in 1080i for HDTV and broadcast simultaneously on BBC One and BBC HD. The 2021 festive special "Revolution of the Daleks" was available on BBC iPlayer in 4K.

To celebrate the 50th anniversary of the show, a special 3D episode, "The Day of the Doctor", was broadcast in 2013. In March 2013, it was announced that Tennant and Piper would be returning and that the episode would have a limited cinematic release worldwide.

In June 2017, it was announced that due to the terms of a deal between BBC Worldwide and SMG Pictures in China, the company had first right of refusal on the purchase for the Chinese market of future series of the programme until and including Series 15.

=== Missing episodes ===
Between 1967 and 1978, large amounts of older material stored in the BBC's various video tape and film libraries was either destroyed (Note: The tapes were on a 405-line broadcast standard and not transferred to the 625-line television system entering use.) or wiped. This included many early episodes of Doctor Who, those stories featuring the first two Doctors: William Hartnell and Patrick Troughton. In all, 95 of 253 episodes produced during the programme's first six years are not held in the BBC's archives. (Note: Source for 97 episodes missing from the BBC as of November 2023.; Source for two further episodes recovered in March 2026.) In 1972, almost all episodes then made were known to exist at the BBC, while by 1978 the practice of wiping tapes and destroying "spare" film copies had been brought to a stop. No 1960s episodes exist on their original videotapes (all surviving prints being film transfers), though some were transferred to film for editing before transmission and exist in their broadcast form.

The BBC has retrieved some missing episodes from archives in foreign countries that had received prints for their original broadcasts and also from private individuals who had acquired them by various means. Early colour videotape recordings made off-air by fans have also been retrieved, as well as excerpts filmed from the television screen onto 8 mm cine film and clips that were shown on other programmes. Audio versions of all lost episodes exist from home viewers who made tape recordings of the show. Short clips from every story with the exception of Marco Polo (1964), "Mission to the Unknown" (1965) and The Massacre (1966) also exist.

Off-screen photographs (tele-snaps) were made by photographer John Cura, who was hired by various production personnel to document programmes during the 1950s and 1960s, including Doctor Who. These have been used in fan reconstructions of the serials. The BBC has tolerated amateur reconstructions, provided they are not sold for profit and are distributed as low-quality copies.

One of the most sought-after lost episodes is part four of the last William Hartnell serial, The Tenth Planet (1966), which ends with the First Doctor transforming into the Second. The only portion of this in existence, barring a few poor-quality silent 8 mm clips, is the few seconds of the regeneration scene, as it was shown on the children's magazine show Blue Peter.

Official reconstructions have also been released by the BBC on VHS, on MP3 CD-ROM, and as special features on DVD. The BBC, in conjunction with animation studio Cosgrove Hall, reconstructed the missing episodes 1 and 4 of The Invasion (1968), using remastered audio tracks and the comprehensive stage notes for the original filming, for the serial's DVD release in November 2006. The missing episodes of The Reign of Terror were animated by animation company Theta-Sigma, in collaboration with Big Finish, and became available for purchase in May 2013 through Amazon.com. Subsequent animations made in 2013–4 include The Tenth Planet, The Ice Warriors (1967) and The Moonbase (1967). Production of animated reconstructions accelerated in the 2020s.

In April 2006, Blue Peter launched a challenge to find missing Doctor Who episodes with the promise of a full-scale Dalek model as a reward. In December 2011, it was announced that part 3 of Galaxy 4 (1965) and part 2 of The Underwater Menace (1967) had been returned to the BBC by a film collector who did not realise the films' value. In October 2013, the BBC announced that film copies of nine missing episodes were found in a television relay station in Jos, Nigeria. This included the complete six-part serial The Enemy of the World (1968) and all but episode 3 of The Web of Fear (1968). On 13 March 2026, it was announced that episodes 1 and 3 of The Daleks' Master Plan had been recovered.

== Characters ==
=== The Doctor ===
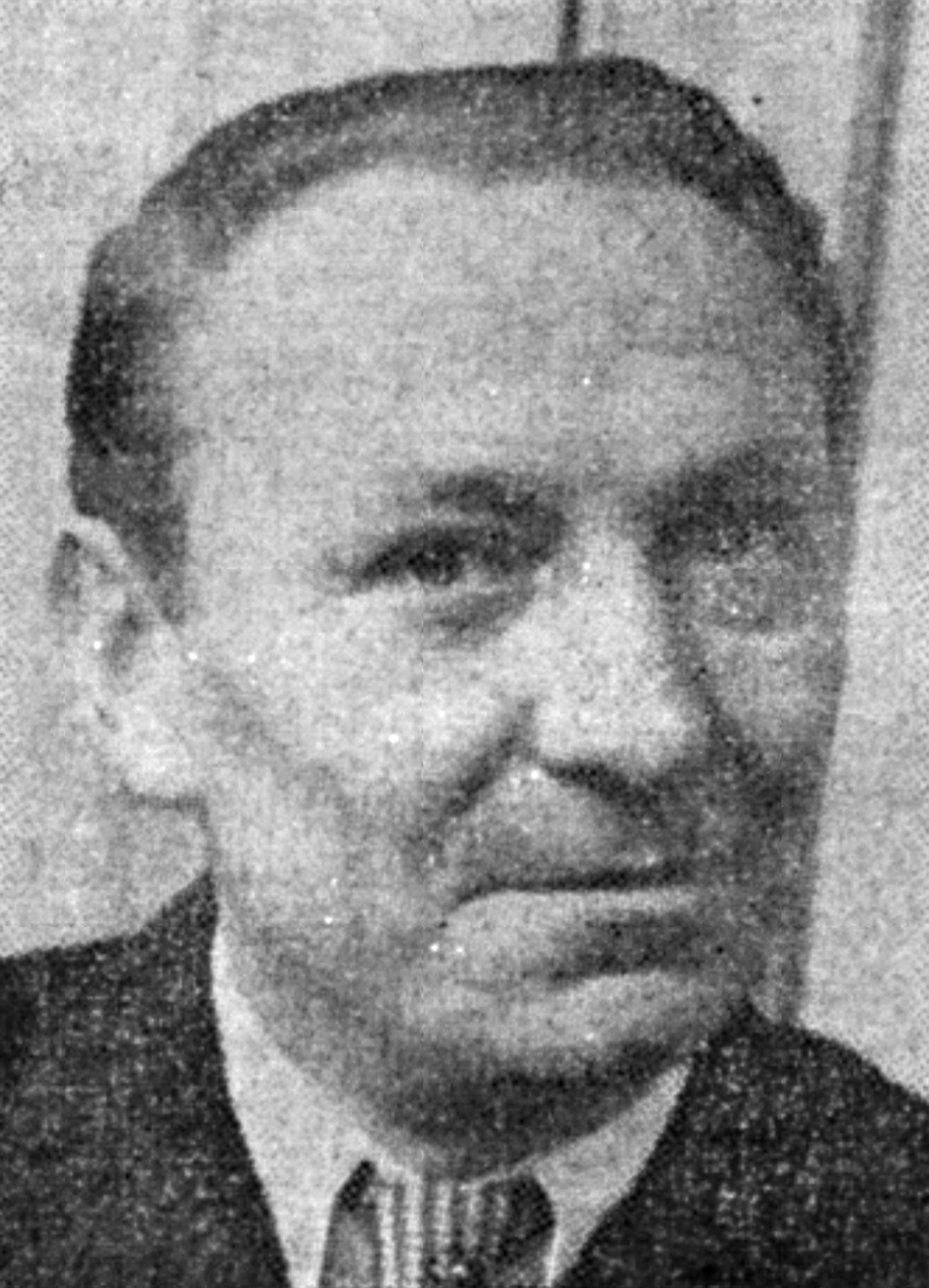
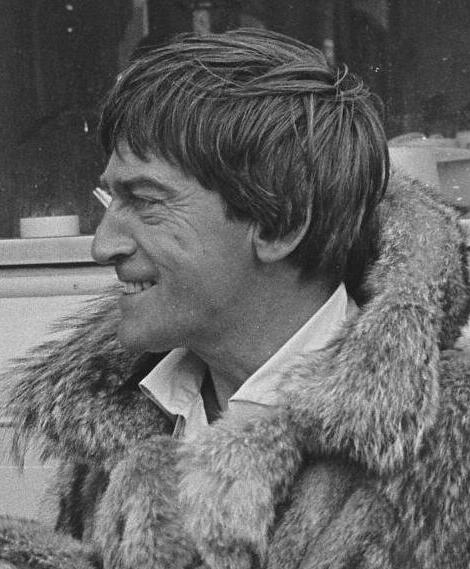
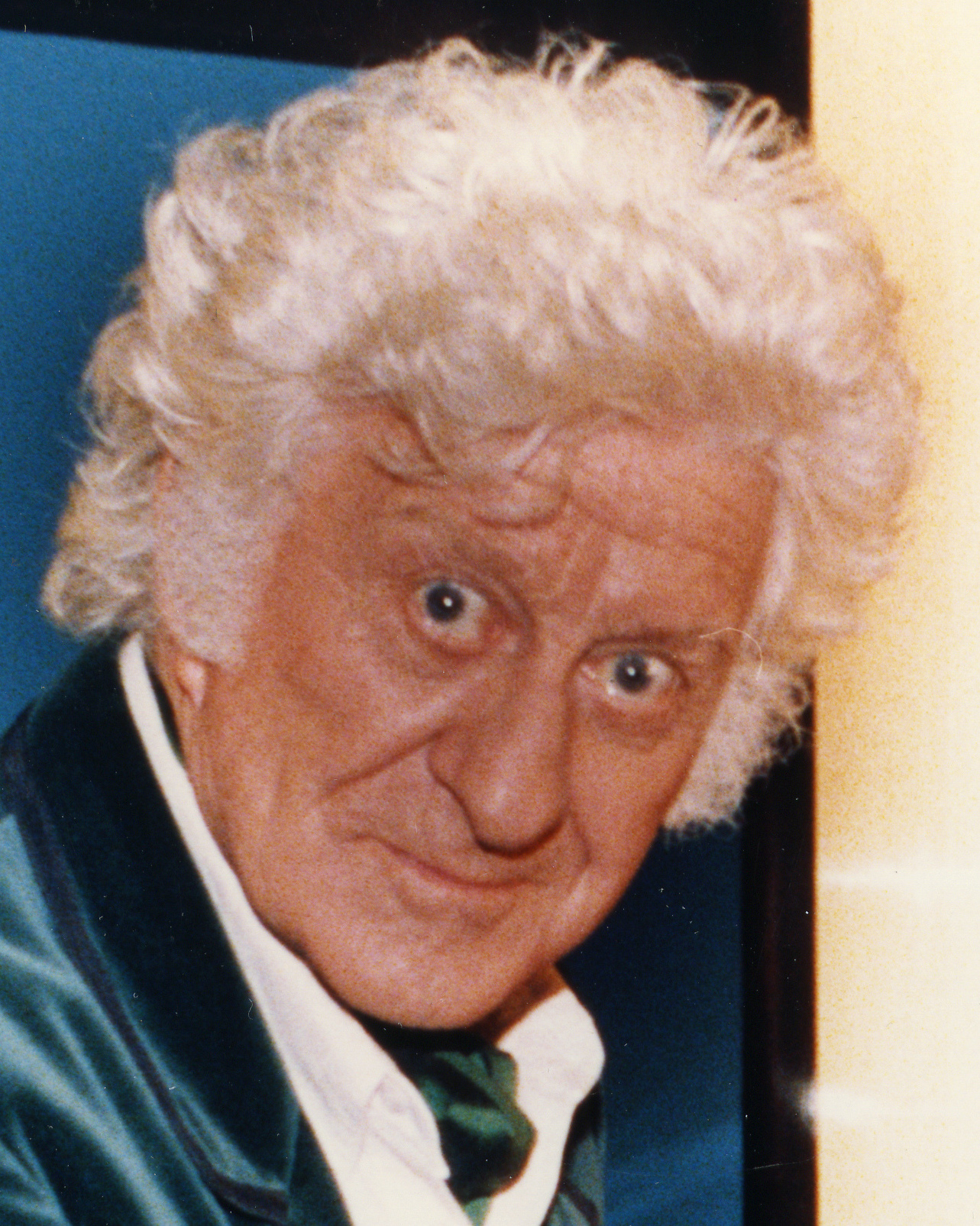
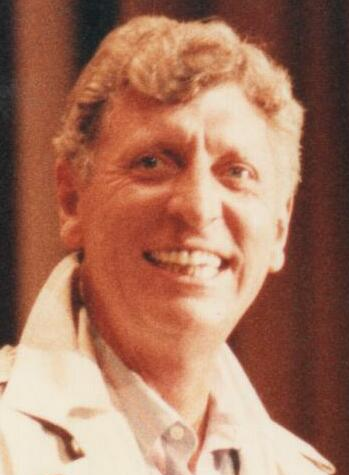
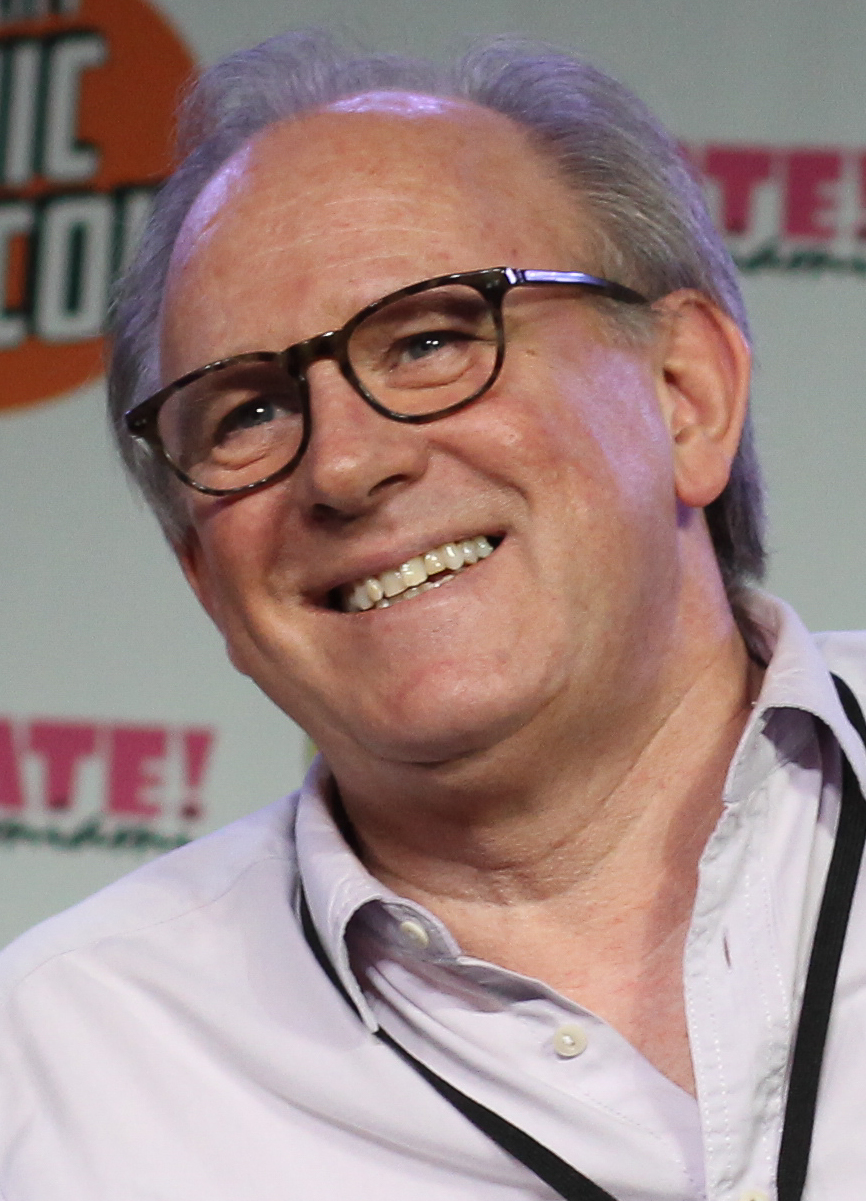
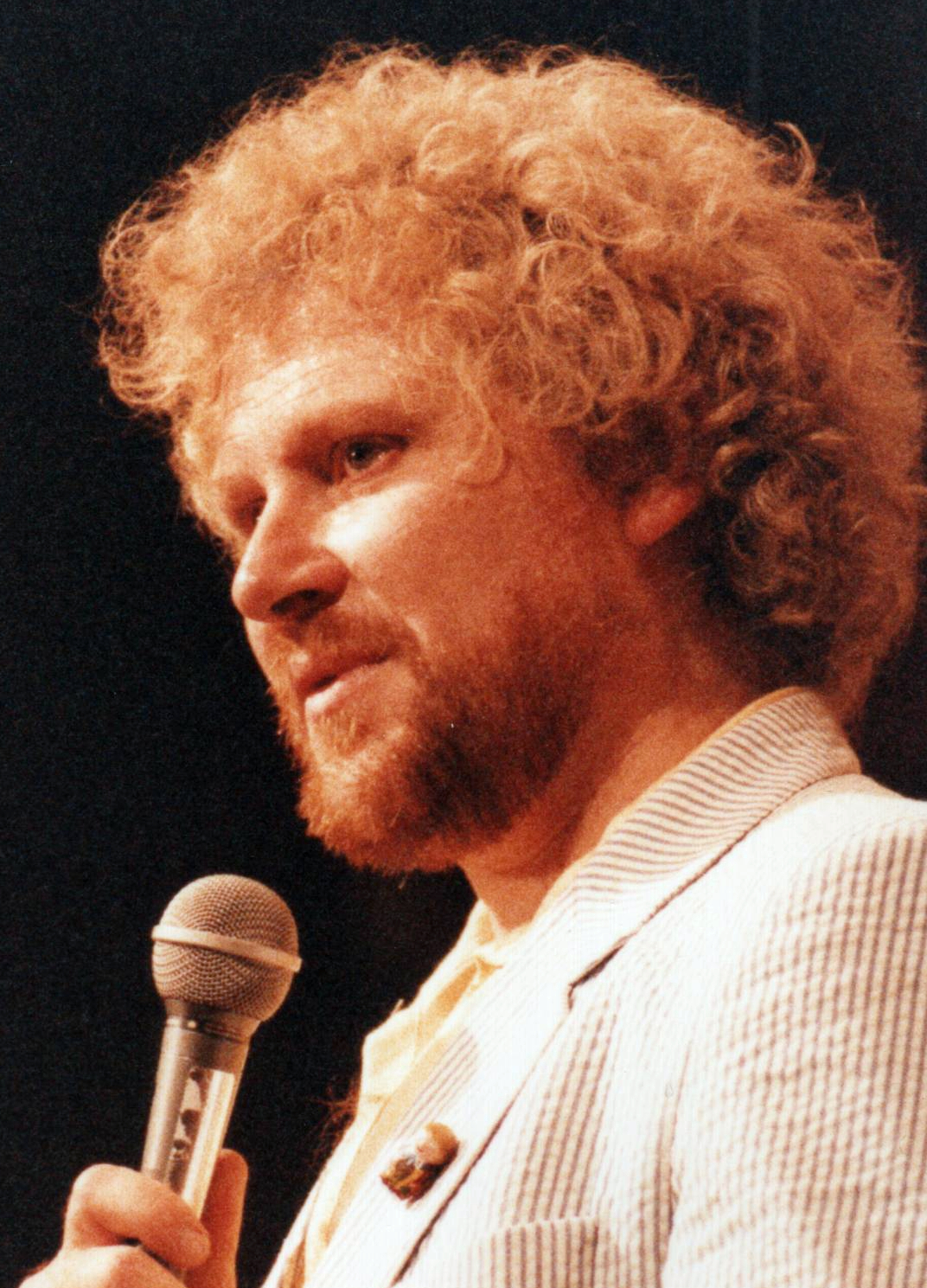
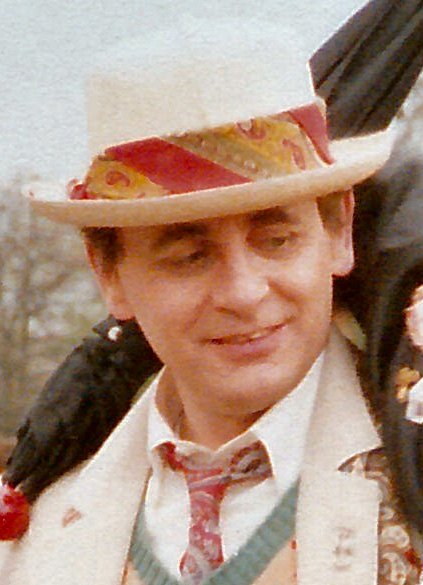
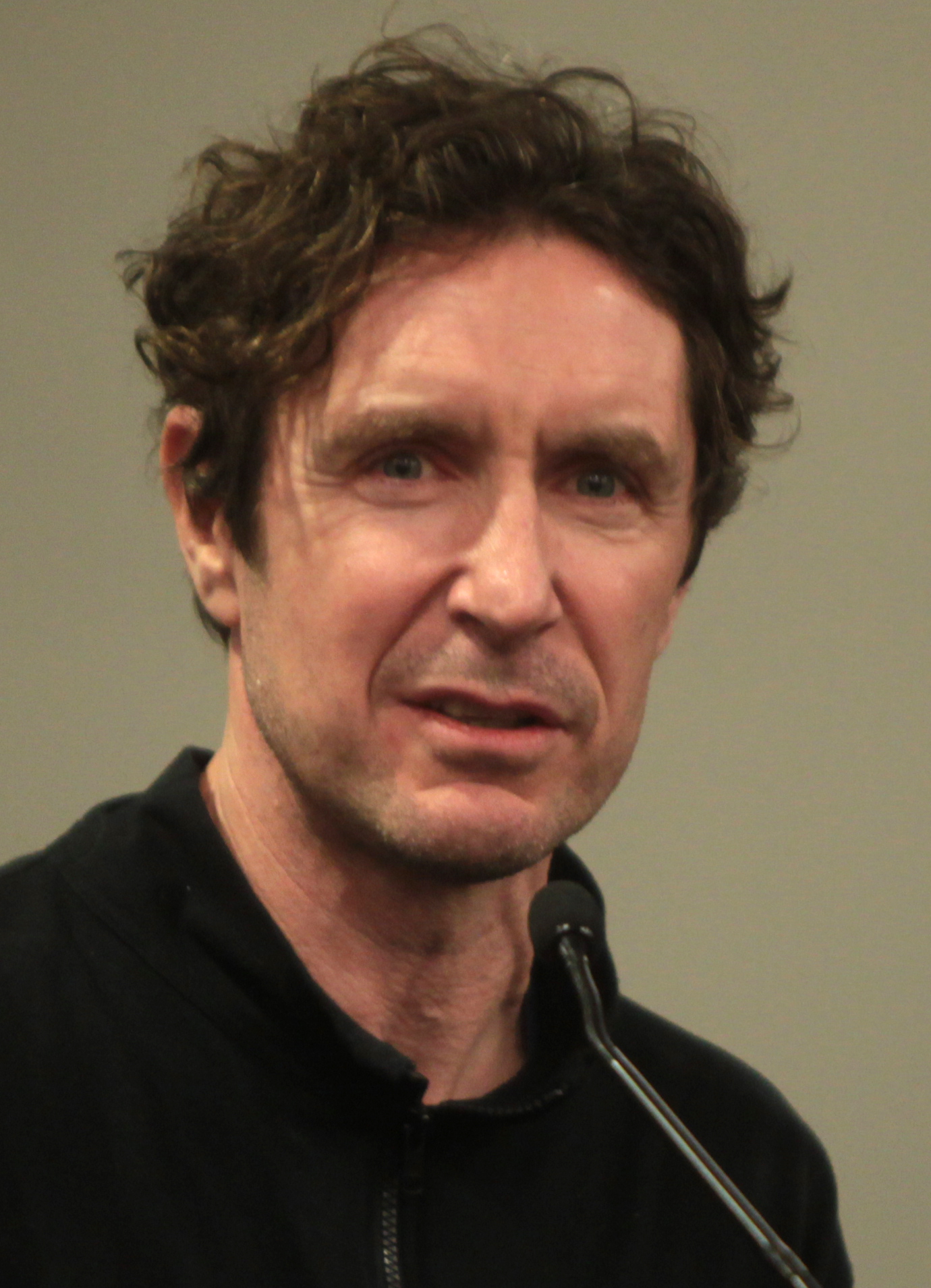
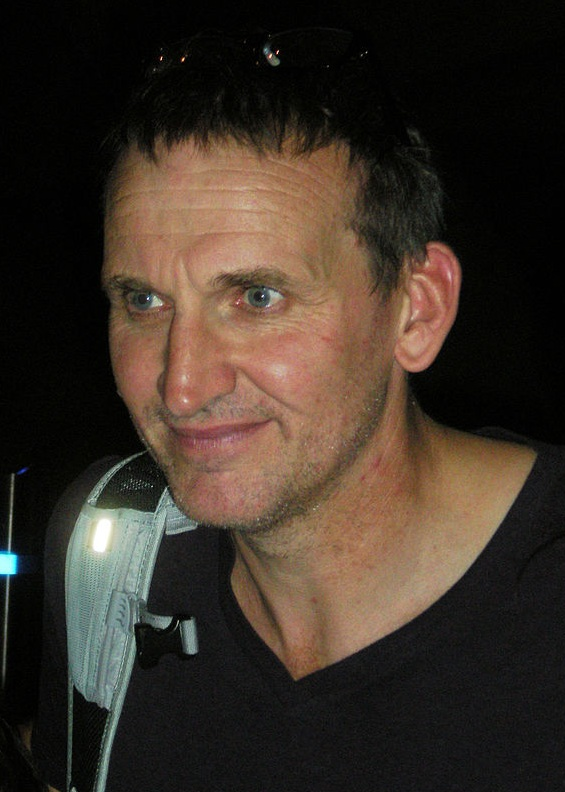
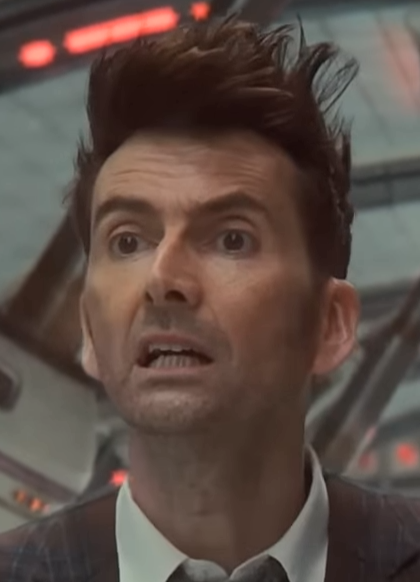
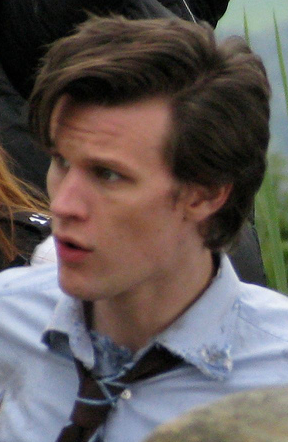
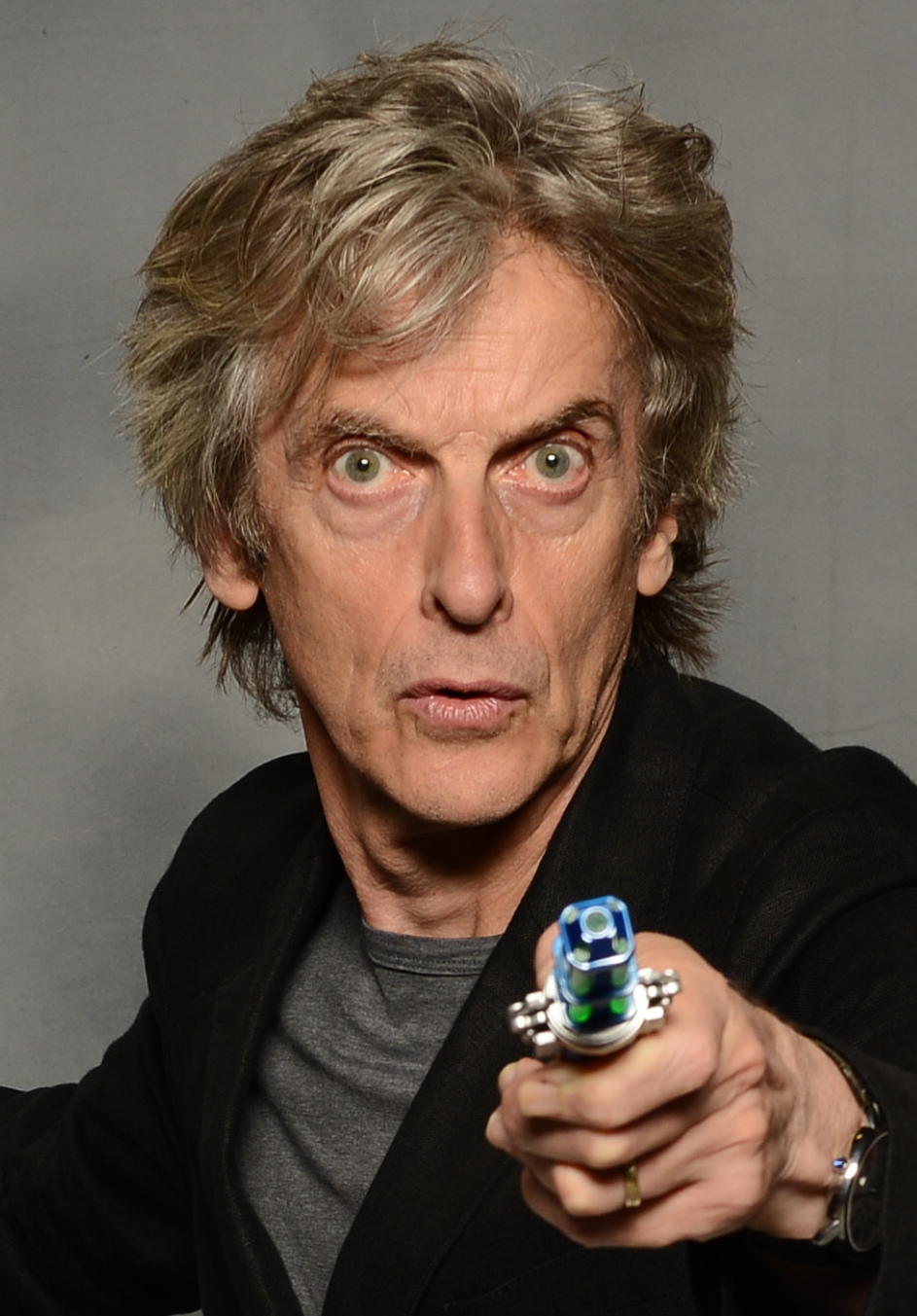
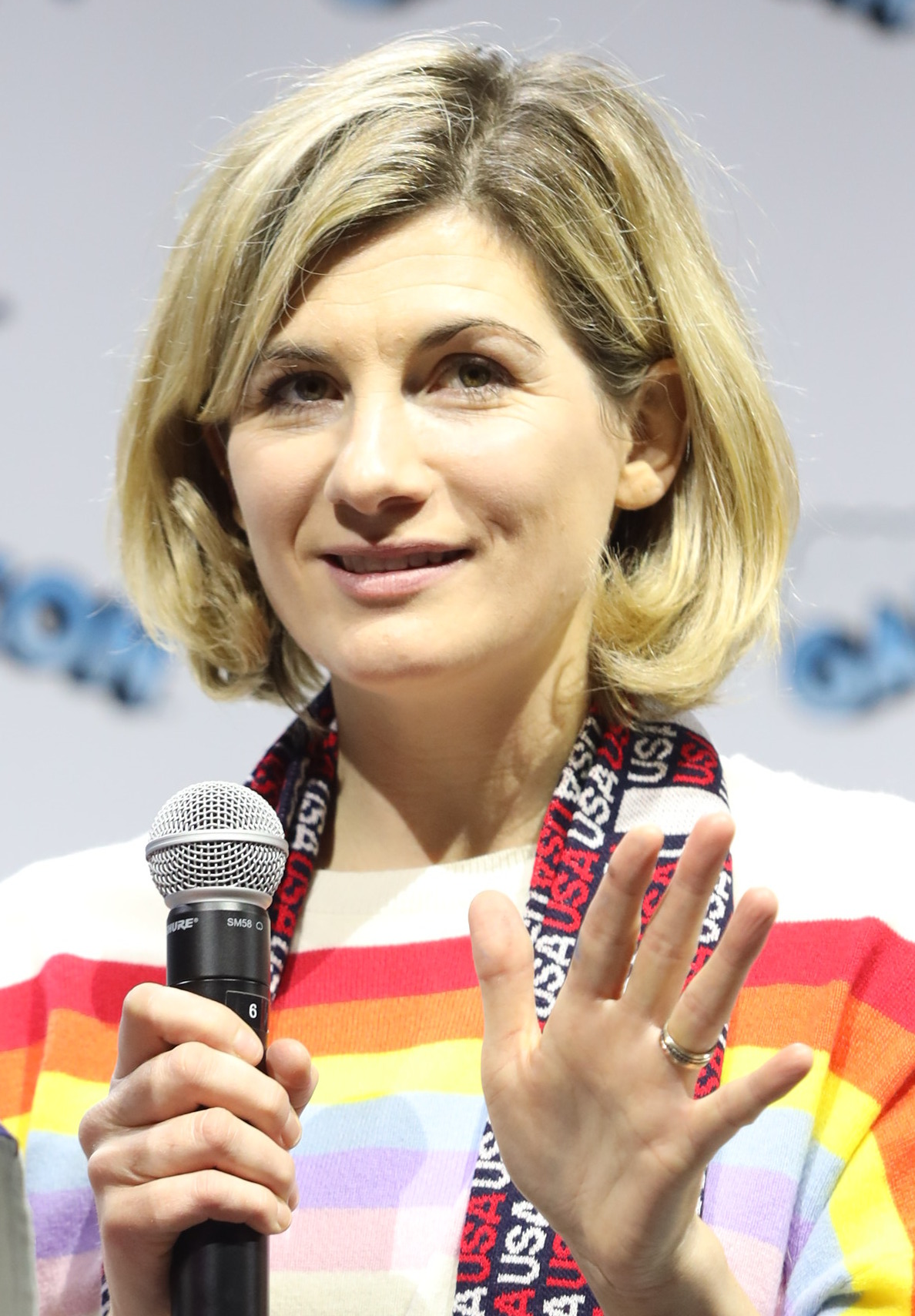
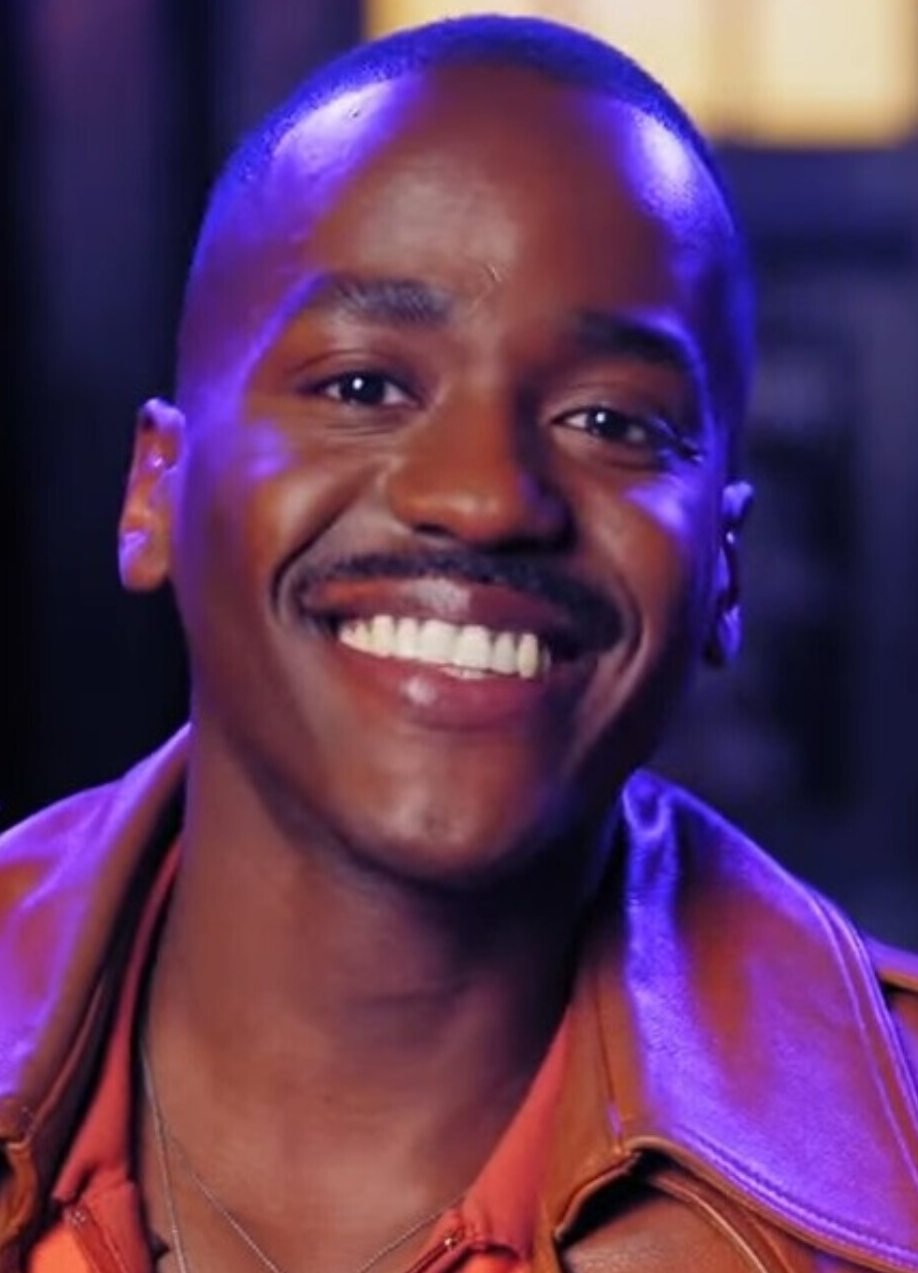
Fourteen actors have portrayed the Doctor in a leading role in Doctor Who.

Left to right from top row: William Hartnell, Patrick Troughton, Jon Pertwee, Tom Baker, Peter Davison, Colin Baker, Sylvester McCoy, Paul McGann, Christopher Eccleston, David Tennant, Matt Smith, Peter Capaldi, Jodie Whittaker, and Ncuti Gatwa.

The Doctor was initially shrouded in mystery. In the programme's early days, the character was an eccentric alien traveller of great intelligence who battled injustice while exploring time and space in an unreliable time machine, the TARDIS (an acronym for "Time and Relative Dimension in Space"), which notably appears much larger on the inside than on the outside. (Note: When it became an entry in the Oxford English Dictionary, the word "TARDIS" often came to be used to describe anything that appeared larger on the inside than its exterior implied.)

The initially irascible and slightly sinister Doctor quickly mellowed into a more compassionate figure and was eventually revealed to be a Time Lord, whose race are from the planet Gallifrey, which the Doctor fled by stealing the TARDIS. Gallifrey was thought to have been the home planet of the Doctor, as it was for the other Time Lords. In 2020, it was revealed that the Doctor came from another world entirely.

==== Changes of appearance ====
Producers introduced the concept of regeneration to permit the recasting of the main character. This was prompted by the poor health of the original star, William Hartnell. The term "regeneration" was not conceived until the Doctor's third on-screen regeneration; Hartnell's Doctor merely described undergoing a "renewal", and the Second Doctor underwent a "change of appearance". The device has allowed for the recasting of the actor various times in the show's history, as well as the depiction of alternative Doctors either from the Doctor's relative past or future.

The serial The Deadly Assassin (1976) established that a Time Lord can only regenerate 12 times, for a total of 13 incarnations. This line became stuck in the public consciousness despite not often being repeated and was recognised by producers of the show as a plot obstacle for when the show finally had to regenerate the Doctor a thirteenth time. The episode "The Time of the Doctor" (2013) depicted the Doctor acquiring a new cycle of regenerations, starting from the Twelfth Doctor, due to the Eleventh Doctor being the product of the Doctor's twelfth regeneration from his original set.

Although the idea of casting a woman as the Doctor had been suggested by the show's writers several times, including by Newman in 1986 and Davies in 2008, until 2017, all official depictions were played by men. Jodie Whittaker took over the role as the Thirteenth Doctor at the end of the 2017 Christmas special and is the first woman to be cast as the character. The show introduced the Time Lords' ability to change sex on regeneration in earlier episodes, first in dialogue, then with Michelle Gomez's version of the Master.

Upon Whittaker's final appearance as the character in "The Power of the Doctor" on 23 October 2022, she regenerated into a form portrayed by David Tennant, who was confirmed to be the Fourteenth Doctor and the first actor to play two incarnations, having previously played the Tenth Doctor. In the same year, Ncuti Gatwa was revealed to be portraying the Fifteenth Doctor, making him the first black actor to headline the series. In "The Reality War", the Fifteenth Doctor regenerates into a character portrayed by Billie Piper, who previously portrayed the Doctor's companion Rose Tyler. While Piper's official role remains undisclosed, with the closing credits merely reading "Introducing Billie Piper", some sources assumed her to be taking on the sixteenth incarnation.

Series lead	Incarnation	Tenure (Note: The years shown cover the actor's tenure as the lead character only.)
William Hartnell	First Doctor	1963–1966
Patrick Troughton	Second Doctor	1966–1969
Jon Pertwee	Third Doctor	1970–1974
Tom Baker	Fourth Doctor	1974–1981
Peter Davison	Fifth Doctor	1982–1984
Colin Baker	Sixth Doctor	1984–1986
Sylvester McCoy	Seventh Doctor	1987–1989
Paul McGann	Eighth Doctor	1996
Christopher Eccleston	Ninth Doctor	2005
David Tennant	Tenth Doctor	2005–2010
Matt Smith	Eleventh Doctor	2010–2013
Peter Capaldi	Twelfth Doctor	2014–2017
Jodie Whittaker	Thirteenth Doctor	2018–2022
David Tennant	Fourteenth Doctor	2023
Ncuti Gatwa	Fifteenth Doctor	2023–2025

In addition to those actors who have headlined the series, others have portrayed versions of the Doctor in guest roles. Notably, in 2013, John Hurt guest-starred as a hitherto unknown incarnation of the Doctor known as the War Doctor in the run-up to the show's 50th-anniversary special "The Day of the Doctor". He is shown in mini-episode "The Night of the Doctor" retroactively inserted into the show's fictional chronology between McGann's and Eccleston's Doctors, although his introduction was written so as not to disturb the established numerical naming of the Doctors. The show later introduced another such unknown past Doctor with Jo Martin's recurring portrayal of the Fugitive Doctor, beginning with "Fugitive of the Judoon" (2020). An example from the original series comes from The Trial of a Time Lord (1986), in which Michael Jayston's character the Valeyard is described as an amalgamation of the darker sides of the Doctor's nature, somewhere between the twelfth and final incarnation. The most recent example is when Richard E. Grant, who previously portrayed an alternate version of the Doctor known as the Shalka Doctor in the animated series Scream of the Shalka (2003), appeared as a hologram of a past Doctor in "Rogue" (2024).

On rare occasions, other actors have stood in for the lead. In "The Five Doctors", Richard Hurndall played the First Doctor due to William Hartnell's death in 1975; 34 years later David Bradley similarly replaced Hartnell in "Twice Upon a Time". In Time and the Rani, Sylvester McCoy briefly played the Sixth Doctor during the regeneration sequence, carrying on as the Seventh. In other media, the Doctor has been played by various other actors, including Peter Cushing in two films.

The casting of a new Doctor has often inspired debate and speculation. Common topics of focus include the Doctor's sex (prior to the casting of Whittaker, all official incarnations were male), race (all Doctors were white prior to the casting of Jo Martin in "Fugitive of the Judoon") and age (the youngest actor to be cast is Smith at 26, and the oldest are Capaldi and Hartnell, both 55).

==== Meetings of different incarnations ====
There have been instances of actors returning later to reprise their specific Doctor's role. In 1972–1973's The Three Doctors, William Hartnell and Patrick Troughton returned alongside Jon Pertwee. For 1983's "The Five Doctors", Troughton and Pertwee returned to star with Peter Davison, and Tom Baker appeared in previously unseen footage from the uncompleted Shada serial. For this episode, Richard Hurndall replaced William Hartnell. Patrick Troughton again returned in 1985's The Two Doctors with Colin Baker.

In 2007, Peter Davison returned in the Children in Need short "Time Crash" alongside David Tennant. In "The Name of the Doctor" (2013), the Eleventh Doctor meets a previously unseen incarnation of himself, subsequently revealed to be the War Doctor. In the following episode, "The Day of the Doctor", David Tennant's Tenth Doctor appeared alongside Matt Smith as the Eleventh Doctor and John Hurt as the War Doctor, as well as brief footage of all the previous actors. In 2017, the First Doctor (this time portrayed by David Bradley) returned alongside Peter Capaldi in "The Doctor Falls" and "Twice Upon a Time".

In 2020's "Fugitive of the Judoon", Jodie Whittaker as the Thirteenth Doctor meets Jo Martin's incarnation of the Doctor, subsequently known as the Fugitive Doctor; they interact again in the episode "The Timeless Children" later that year as well as in "Once, Upon Time" in 2021. In her final episode as the lead role, "The Power of the Doctor" (2022), Whittaker interacts with the Guardians of the Edge, manifestations of the Doctor's First (Bradley), Fifth (Davison), Sixth (Colin Baker), Seventh (McCoy), and Eighth (McGann) incarnations. In "The Giggle" (2023), following the unusual bi-generation of the Fourteenth Doctor which saw the Fifteenth Doctor split out from him, the two Doctors shared a scene together as they defeated the episode's villain, the Toymaker. The Fifteenth Doctor briefly interacts with the Thirteenth Doctor in his final episode in the lead role, 2025's "The Reality War".

=== Companions ===
The companion figure – generally a human – has been a constant feature in Doctor Who since the programme's inception in 1963. One of the roles of the companion is to be a reminder for the Doctor's "moral duty". The Doctor's first companions seen on-screen were his granddaughter Susan Foreman (Carole Ann Ford) and her teachers Barbara Wright (Jacqueline Hill) and Ian Chesterton (William Russell). These characters were intended to act as audience surrogates, through which the audience would discover information about the Doctor, who was to act as a mysterious father figure. The only story from the original series in which the Doctor travels alone is "The Deadly Assassin" (1976). Notable companions from the earlier series include a Time Lady named Romana (Mary Tamm and Lalla Ward), and humans such as Jamie McCrimmon (Frazer Hines), Jo Grant (Katy Manning), Sarah Jane Smith (Elisabeth Sladen), Tegan Jovanka (Janet Fielding), Peri Brown (Nicola Bryant), and Ace (Sophie Aldred). Dramatically, these characters provide a figure with whom the audience can identify and serve to further the story by requesting exposition from the Doctor and manufacturing peril for the Doctor to resolve. The Doctor regularly gains new companions and loses old ones; sometimes they return home or find new causes—or loves—on worlds they have visited. Some have died during the course of the series. Companions are usually humans or humanoid aliens.

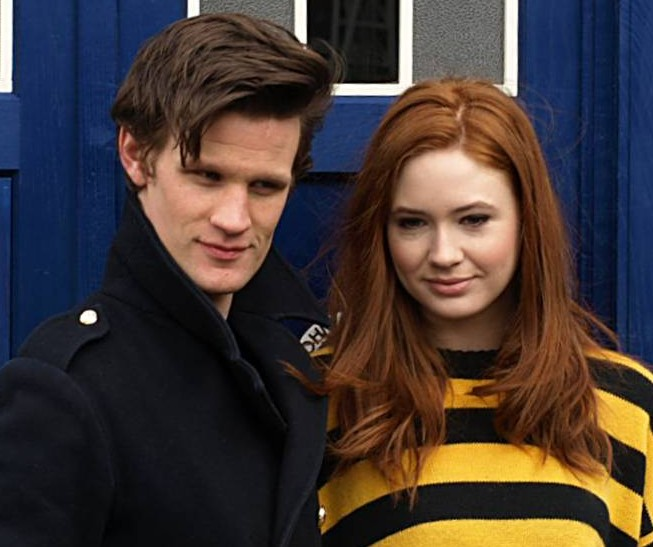
Karen Gillan (pictured in 2010 with the Eleventh Doctor, Matt Smith) played the Doctor's companion Amy Pond.

Since the 2005 revival, the Doctor generally travels with a primary female companion, who occupies a larger narrative role. Steven Moffat described the companion as the main character of the show, as the story begins anew with each companion and she undergoes more change than the Doctor. The primary companions of the Ninth and Tenth Doctors were Rose Tyler (Billie Piper), Martha Jones (Freema Agyeman), and Donna Noble (Catherine Tate), with Mickey Smith (Noel Clarke) and Jack Harkness (John Barrowman) recurring as secondary companion figures. The Eleventh Doctor became the first to travel with a married couple, Amy Pond (Karen Gillan) and Rory Williams (Arthur Darvill), whilst out-of-sync meetings with River Song (Alex Kingston) and Clara Oswald (Jenna Coleman) provided ongoing story arcs that continued with the Twelfth Doctor. The tenth series included the alien Nardole (Matt Lucas) and introduced Pearl Mackie as Bill Potts, the Doctor's first openly gay companion. Mackie said that the increased representation of LGBTQ people is important on a mainstream show. The Thirteenth Doctor primarily travelled with Ryan Sinclair (Tosin Cole), Graham O'Brien (Bradley Walsh), Yasmin Khan (Mandip Gill), and Dan Lewis (John Bishop). When David Tennant returned as the Fourteenth Doctor, former co-star Catherine Tate joined him to reprise her role of Donna Noble for the 2023 specials. The Fifteenth Doctor travelled with Ruby Sunday (Millie Gibson) in his first series and Belinda Chandra (Varada Sethu) in his second. The combination of Gatwa and Sethu was notable for being the first time the primary cast of the show consisted entirely of non-white actors.

Some companions have gone on to reappear, either in the main series or in spin-offs. Sarah Jane Smith became the central character in The Sarah Jane Adventures (2007–2011) following a return to Doctor Who in 2006. Guest stars in the series include former companions Jo Grant, K9, and Brigadier Lethbridge-Stewart (Nicholas Courtney). The character of Jack Harkness also served to launch a spin-off, Torchwood (2006–2011), in which Martha Jones also appeared.

=== Foes ===
When Sydney Newman commissioned the series, he specifically did not want to perpetuate the cliché of the "bug-eyed monster" of science fiction. However, monsters were popular with audiences and so became a staple of Doctor Who almost from the beginning. Daleks, Cybermen, and the Master are some of the most iconic foes the Doctor has battled in the series.

With the show's 2005 revival, executive producer Russell T Davies stated his intention to reintroduce the classic monsters of Doctor Who. The Autons with the Nestene Consciousness, first seen in 1970's Spearhead from Space, and Daleks, first seen in 1963's The Daleks, returned in series 1. Davies's successor, Steven Moffat, continued the trend by reviving the Silurians, also first seen in 1970, in series 5 and Zygons, first seen in 1975, in the 50th-anniversary special. Since its 2005 return, the series has also introduced new recurring aliens: Slitheen (Raxacoricofallapatorians), Ood, Judoon, Weeping Angels and the Silence.

==== Daleks ====
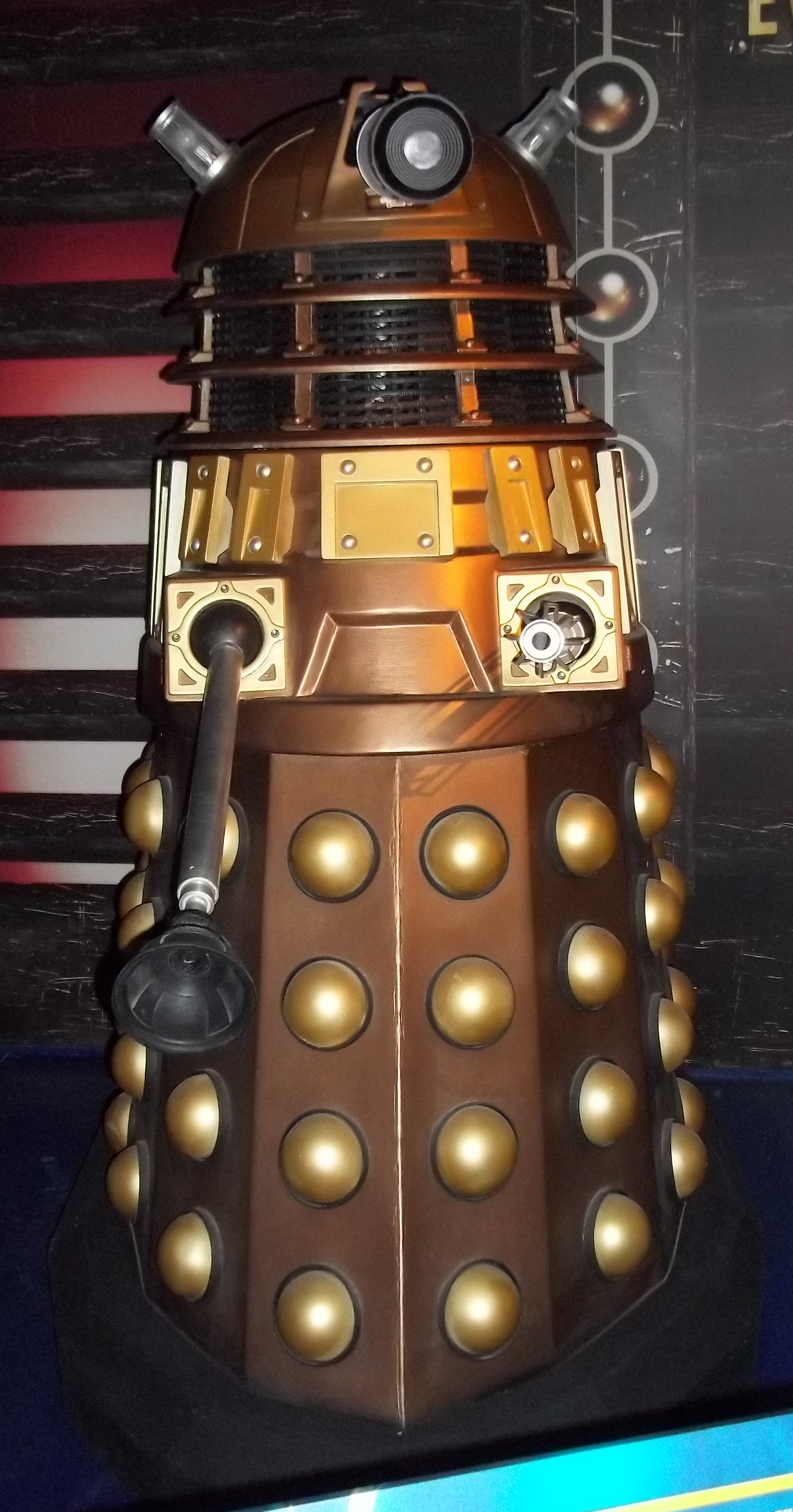
A Dalek at the Doctor Who Experience, Cardiff

The Daleks, which first appeared in the show's second serial in 1963, are Doctor Who's oldest villains. The Daleks are Kaleds from the planet Skaro, mutated by the scientist Davros and housed in mechanical armour shells for mobility. The actual creatures resemble octopuses with large, pronounced brains. Their armour shells have a single eye-stalk, a sink-plunger-like device that serves the purpose of a hand, and a directed-energy weapon. Their main weakness is their eyestalk; attacks upon them using various weapons can blind a Dalek, making it go mad. Their chief role in the series plot, as they frequently remark in their instantly recognisable metallic voices, is to "exterminate" all non-Dalek beings. They even attack the Time Lords in the Time War, as shown during the 50th Anniversary of the show. They continue to be a recurring 'monster' within the Doctor Who franchise, having appeared in every series since 2005 apart from series 14 in 2024. (Note: The character Anita (Steph de Whalley) sees a real Dalek pass in front of her in series 15's "The Reality War" (2025), alongside a scene of stock footage from 1972's Day of the Daleks.) Davros has also been a recurring figure since his debut in Genesis of the Daleks, although played by several different actors.

The Daleks were created by the writer Terry Nation (who intended them to be an allegory of the Nazis) and BBC designer Raymond Cusick. The Daleks' début in the programme's second serial, The Daleks (1963–1964), made both the Daleks and Doctor Who very popular. A Dalek appeared on a postage stamp celebrating British popular culture in 1999, photographed by Lord Snowdon. The Daleks received another stamp in 2013 as part of the 50th anniversary. In "Victory of the Daleks" a new set of Daleks was introduced that come in a range of colours; the colour denoting its role within the species.

==== Cybermen ====
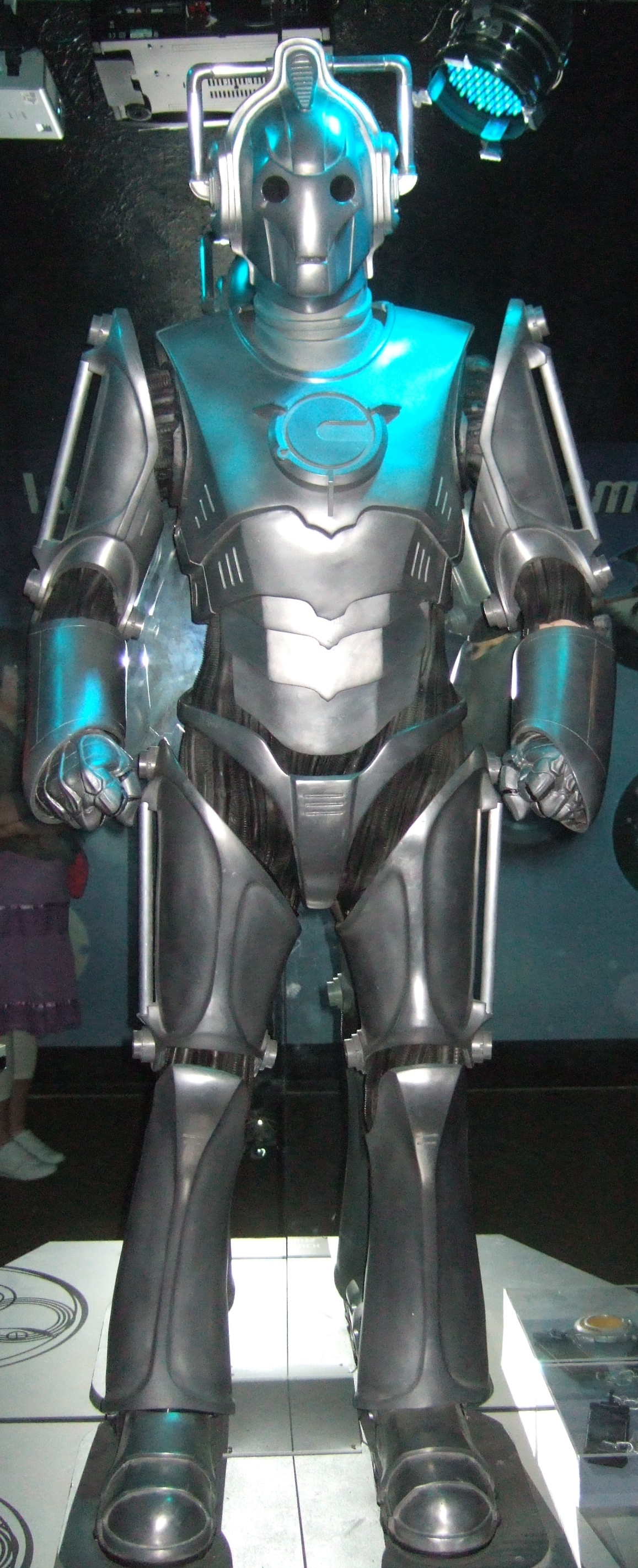
A 2006 Cyberman

Cybermen were originally a wholly organic species of humanoids originating on Earth's twin planet Mondas that began to implant more and more artificial parts into their bodies. This led to the race becoming coldly logical and calculating cyborgs, with emotions usually only shown when naked aggression was called for. With the demise of Mondas, they acquired Telos as their new home planet. They continue to be a recurring 'monster' within the Doctor Who franchise.

The Cybermen have evolved dramatically over the course of the show. They were reintroduced in the 2006 series in the form of humans from a parallel universe Earth, with radically different back stories. Later appearances included Cybermen originating from Mondas again, along with a redesign in 2013's "Nightmare in Silver" considered as a mixture of Mondasian and parallel universe technology. In the 2020 series, the Cybermen aligned themselves with The Master, and were given the ability to regenerate.

==== The Master ====
The Master is the Doctor's archenemy, a renegade Time Lord who desires to rule the universe. Conceived as "Professor Moriarty to the Doctor's Sherlock Holmes", the character first appeared in 1971. As with the Doctor, the role has been portrayed by several actors, since the Master is a Time Lord as well and able to regenerate; the first of these actors was Roger Delgado, who continued in the role until his death in 1973. The Master was briefly played by Peter Pratt and Geoffrey Beevers until Anthony Ainley took over and continued to play the character until Doctor Who's hiatus in 1989. The Master returned in the 1996 television film, and was played by American actor Eric Roberts.

Following the series revival in 2005, Derek Jacobi provided the character's reintroduction in the 2007 episode "Utopia". During that story, the role was then assumed by John Simm, who returned to the role multiple times throughout the Tenth Doctor's tenure. Michelle Gomez played Missy, a female version of the Master, multiple times in the Twelfth Doctor's tenure. Simm returned to his role as the Master alongside Gomez in the tenth series. The Master returned for the 2020 twelfth series with Sacha Dhawan in the role.

== Music ==
=== Theme music ===
Doctor Who theme excerpt
An excerpt from the original (1963) classic theme music to Doctor Who

The Doctor Who theme music was one of the first electronic music signature tunes for television. The original theme was composed by Ron Grainer and realised by Delia Derbyshire of the BBC Radiophonic Workshop, with assistance from Dick Mills, and was released as a single on Decca F 11837 in 1964. The Derbyshire arrangement served, with minor edits, as the theme tune up to the end of season 17 (1979–1980). It was a significant and innovative piece of electronic music recorded well before the availability of commercial synthesisers or multitrack mixers. Each note was individually created by cutting, splicing, speeding up and slowing down segments of analogue tape containing recordings of a single plucked string, white noise, and the simple harmonic waveforms of test-tone oscillators, intended for calibrating equipment and rooms, not creating music. New techniques were invented to allow mixing of the music, as this was before the era of multitrack tape machines. On hearing the finished result, Grainer asked, "Jeez, Delia, did I write that?" She answered, "Most of it." Although Grainer was willing to give Derbyshire the co-composer credit, it was against BBC policy at the time. She would not receive an on-screen credit until the 50th-anniversary story "The Day of the Doctor" in 2013.

A different arrangement was recorded by Peter Howell for season 18 (1980–1981), which was in turn replaced by Dominic Glynn's arrangement for the season-long serial The Trial of a Time Lord in season 23 (1986). Keff McCulloch provided the new arrangement for the Seventh Doctor's era, which lasted from season 24 (1987) until the series' suspension in 1989. American composer John Debney created a new arrangement of Grainer's original theme for the 1996 Doctor Who film.

Murray Gold provided various arrangements of the theme since 2005. He arranged every version of the 2005 revival series' theme music, with the exception of series 11–13 (2018–2021) and the 2022 specials, when it was arranged by Segun Akinola. Akinola also created a new arrangement of the show's closing theme to play over the end credits of "Demons of the Punjab" (2018) in the style of Punjabi music.

Versions of the "Doctor Who Theme" have also been released as pop music. In the early 1970s, Jon Pertwee, who had played the Third Doctor, recorded a version of the Doctor Who theme with spoken lyrics, titled "Who Is the Doctor". (Note: Often mistitled "I am the Doctor". Originally released as a 7" vinyl single, plain sleeve, December 1972 on label Purple PUR III) In 1978, a disco version of the theme was released in the UK, Denmark and Australia by the group Mankind, which reached number 24 in the UK charts. In 1988, the band The Justified Ancients of Mu Mu (later known as The KLF) released the single "Doctorin' the Tardis" under the name The Timelords, which reached No. 1 in the UK and No. 2 in Australia; this version incorporated several other songs, including "Rock and Roll Part 2" by Gary Glitter (who recorded vocals for some of the CD-single remix versions of "Doctorin' the Tardis"). Others who have covered or reinterpreted the theme include Orbital, Pink Floyd, the Australian string ensemble Fourplay, New Zealand punk band Blam Blam Blam, The Pogues, Thin Lizzy, Dub Syndicate, and the comedians Bill Bailey and Mitch Benn. Both the theme and obsessive fans were satirised on The Chaser's War on Everything. The theme tune has also appeared on many compilation CDs and has made its way into mobile phone ringtones. Fans have also produced and distributed their own remixes of the theme. In January 2011, the Mankind version was released as a digital download on the album Gallifrey And Beyond.

=== Incidental music ===
Most of the innovative incidental music for Doctor Who has been specially commissioned from freelance composers, although in the early years some episodes also used stock music, as well as occasional excerpts from original recordings or cover versions of songs by popular music acts such as The Beatles and the Beach Boys. Since its 2005 return, the series has featured occasional use of excerpts of pop music from the 1950s to the early 21st century.

The incidental music for the first Doctor Who adventure, An Unearthly Child, was written by Norman Kay. Many of the stories of the William Hartnell period were scored by electronic music pioneer Tristram Cary, whose Doctor Who credits include The Daleks, Marco Polo, The Daleks' Master Plan, The Gunfighters and The Mutants. Other composers in this early period included Richard Rodney Bennett, Carey Blyton and Geoffrey Burgon.

The most frequent musical contributor during the first 15 years was Dudley Simpson, who is also well known for his theme and incidental music for Blake's 7, and for his haunting theme music and score for the original 1970s version of The Tomorrow People. Simpson's first Doctor Who score was Planet of Giants (1964), and he went on to write music for many adventures of the 1960s and 1970s, including most of the stories of the Jon Pertwee/Tom Baker periods, ending with The Horns of Nimon (1979). He also made a cameo appearance in The Talons of Weng-Chiang (as a music hall conductor).

In 1980, starting with the serial The Leisure Hive, the task of creating incidental music was assigned to the Radiophonic Workshop. Paddy Kingsland and Peter Howell contributed many scores in this period, and other contributors included Roger Limb, Malcolm Clarke and Jonathan Gibbs. The Radiophonic Workshop was dropped after 1986's The Trial of a Time Lord series, and Keff McCulloch took over as the series' main composer until the end of its run, with Dominic Glynn and Mark Ayres also contributing scores.

From the 2005 revival to the 2017 Christmas episode "Twice Upon a Time", all incidental music for the series was composed by Murray Gold and has been performed by the BBC National Orchestra of Wales from the 2005 Christmas episode "The Christmas Invasion" onwards. A concert featuring the orchestra performing music from the first two series took place on 19 November 2006 to raise money for Children in Need. David Tennant hosted the event, introducing the different sections of the concert. Gold and Russell T Davies answered questions during the interval, and Daleks and Cybermen appeared whilst music from their stories was played. The concert aired on BBCi on Christmas Day 2006. A Doctor Who Prom was celebrated on 27 July 2008 in the Royal Albert Hall as part of the annual BBC Proms. The BBC Philharmonic and the London Philharmonic Choir performed Murray Gold's compositions for the series, conducted by Ben Foster, as well as a selection of classics based on the theme of space and time. The event was presented by Freema Agyeman and guest-presented by various other stars of the show, with numerous monsters participating in the proceedings. It also featured the specially filmed mini-episode "Music of the Spheres", written by Russell T Davies and starring David Tennant. Further Doctor Who Proms, primarily focused on Gold's compositions, were held at the Albert Hall in 2010 (presented by Karen Gillan and Arthur Darvill), 2013 (presented by Neve McIntosh and Dan Starkey), and 2024 (presented by previous guest presenter Catherine Tate). The 2024 Prom was conducted and orchestrated by Alastair King.

On 26 June 2018, producer Chris Chibnall announced that the musical score for series 11 would be provided by Royal Birmingham Conservatoire alumnus Segun Akinola. His approach was described as more subtle and "understated" than Gold's work by critics, and Akinola remained composer throughout Chibnall's tenure, scoring all of the Thirteenth Doctor's episodes.

When Davies returned to produce the show in 2023, he rehired Gold to work on the series for the 60th anniversary episodes and continuing into the Fifteenth Doctor's tenure. Gold made a cameo in the 2024 episode "The Devil's Chord".

31 soundtracks (30 television and one film) have been released physically by Silva Screen Records since 2005, several of them on both CD and vinyl: the first featured tracks from series 1 and 2, and was released in 2006. Following this were series 3 in 2007; series 4 in 2008; an album of both Dr. Who and the Daleks and Daleks' Invasion Earth 2150 A.D. in 2009; the 2008–2010 specials and series 5 in 2010; an album of "A Christmas Carol" and a separate album of series 6 in 2011; The Krotons, The Caves of Androzani, Ghost Light, and series 7 (with "The Doctor, the Widow and the Wardrobe" and "The Snowmen" on a separate album) in 2013; (Note: Multiple citations) an album of both "The Day of the Doctor" and "The Time of the Doctor" in 2014; series 8 in 2015; The Daleks and Survival in 2017; The Invasion, The Five Doctors, and series 9 in 2018; series 11 in 2019; The Sun Makers, The Visitation, and series 12 in 2020; series 13 (with "Revolution of the Daleks" as a bonus disc) in 2022; (Note: "Revolution of the Daleks" was previously released digitally as a standalone album in 2021.) Revenge of the Cybermen, Time and the Rani, and the 2022 specials in 2023; (Note: Previously released digitally as three standalone albums in 2022.) The Daleks in Colour in 2024; series 10 in 2025; and Timelash in 2026.

Additionally, in 2013, a 50th-anniversary boxed set of audio CDs was released featuring music and sound effects from Doctor Who's 50-year history. The celebration continued in 2016 with the release of Doctor Who: The 50th Anniversary Collection Four LP Box Set by New York City-based Spacelab9. The company pressed 1,000 copies of the set on "Metallic Silver" vinyl, dubbed the "Cyberman Edition".

== Viewership ==
=== United Kingdom ===
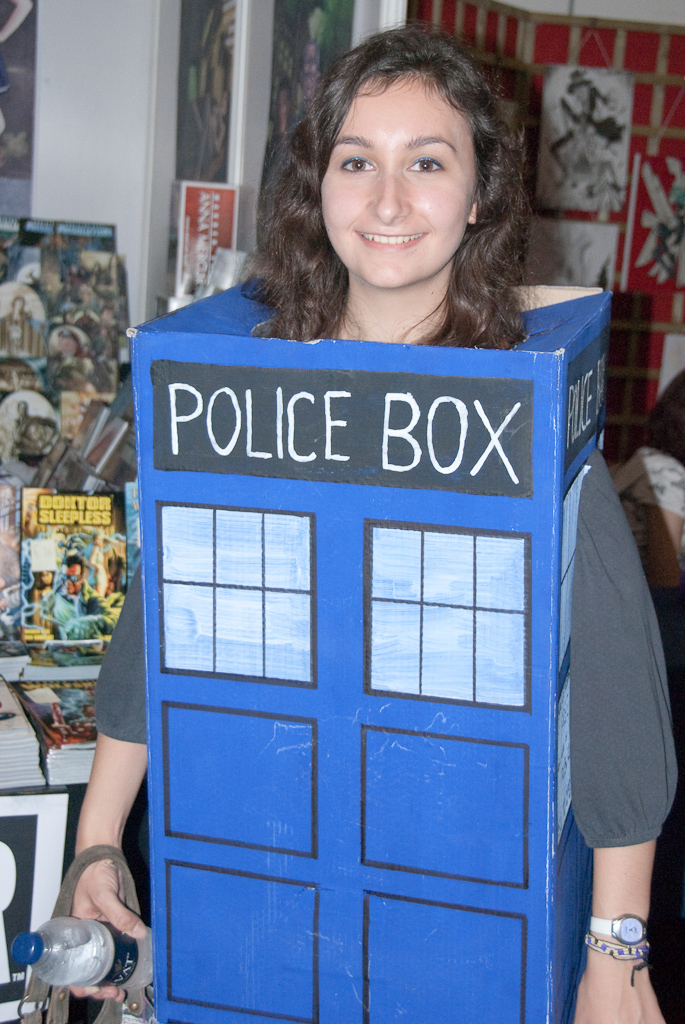
The image of the TARDIS is iconic in British popular culture. Here, a woman is dressed as a TARDIS.

Premiering the day after the assassination of John F. Kennedy, the first episode of Doctor Who was repeated with the second episode the following week. Doctor Who has always appeared initially on the BBC's mainstream BBC One channel, where it is regarded as a family show, drawing audiences of many millions of viewers; The programme's popularity has waxed and waned over the decades, with three notable periods of high ratings, but has become a significant part of British popular culture. The most popular period for the programme's history was the "Dalekmania" period (c. 1964–1965), when the popularity of the Daleks regularly brought Doctor Who ratings of between 9 and 14 million, even for stories which did not feature them. The second was the mid to late 1970s, when Tom Baker occasionally drew audiences of over 12 million.

During the ITV network strike of 1979, viewership peaked at 16 million. Figures remained respectable into the 1980s, but fell noticeably after the programme's 23rd series was postponed in 1985, and the show was off the air for 18 months.

Its late 1980s performance of three to five million viewers was seen as poor at the time and was, according to the BBC Board of Control, a leading cause of the programme's 1989 suspension. Some fans considered this disingenuous, since the programme was scheduled against the ITV soap opera Coronation Street, the most popular show at the time.

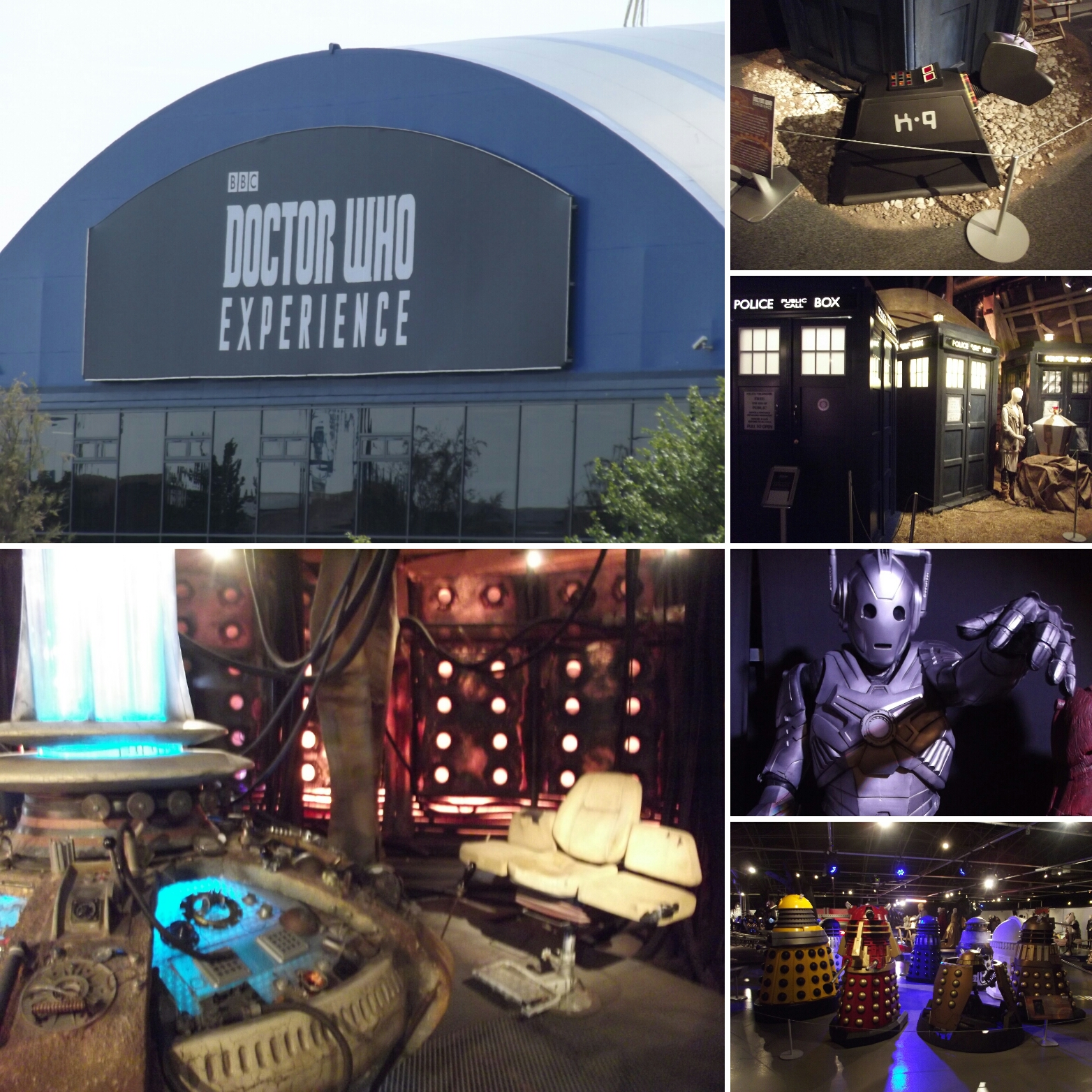
Exhibits in the Doctor Who Experience, Cardiff Bay, in 2015

During Tennant's first run in 2005–2010 (the third notable period of high ratings), the show had consistently high viewership, with the Christmas specials regularly attracting over 10 million. Tennant's specials in 2023 were all seen by over 7 million viewers, with all three specials charting in the top ten of the week after 7 days and 28 days, and Tennant as well as Gatwa's specials including 2024's "Joy to the World" surpassing Coronation Street in the ratings. By 2025, UK ratings after seven days had fallen to an average of 3.2 million viewers, although this was a trend across all TV since the start of the COVID-19 pandemic, with many other dramas that used to break 10 million viewers no longer doing so such as Coronation Street at this point averaging 4.8 million, and Doctor Who averaging at 24th place in the weekly charts (the January–March 2020 series was watched by more people but averaged at 25th place).

The BBC One broadcast of "Rose", the first episode of the 2005 revival, drew an average audience of 10.81 million, third highest for BBC One that week and seventh across all channels. By late 2007, the revival had also garnered the highest audience Appreciation Index of any drama on television.

On 29 April 2017, Guinness World Records named Doctor Who the longest-running sci-fi programme with the airing of its 819th episode. It had previously been awarded the title of "most successful" science fiction series in 2009, based on its broadcast viewership, as well as book and DVD sales.

=== International ===
Map of countries that have broadcast Doctor Who (as of 2013)

Doctor Who has been broadcast internationally outside of the United Kingdom since 1964, a year after the show first aired. As of November 2013, the modern series has been broadcast in more than 50 countries. The 50th anniversary episode, "The Day of the Doctor", was broadcast in 94 countries and screened to more than half a million people in cinemas across Australia, Latin America, North America and Europe. The scope of the broadcast was a world record, according to Guinness World Records.

In 2008 Doctor Who was one of the five top-grossing titles for BBC Worldwide, the BBC's commercial arm, (Note: BBC Worldwide and the BBC's production arm were consolidated into BBC Studios in 2018.) and in 2011 it was BBC Worldwide's biggest-selling show. John Smith, BBC Worldwide CEO from 2004 until 2012, has said that Doctor Who is one of a small number of "Superbrands" which are heavily promoted worldwide.

Only four episodes have premiere showings on channels other than BBC One. The 1983 20th-anniversary special "The Five Doctors" had its debut on 23 November (the actual date of the anniversary) on several PBS stations two days before its BBC One broadcast. The 1988 story Silver Nemesis was broadcast with all three episodes airing back to back on TVNZ in New Zealand in November, after the first episode had been shown in the UK but before the final two instalments had aired there.

Starting with the 60th anniversary specials in 2023, Doctor Who began streaming on Disney+ outside of the United Kingdom and Ireland. As with many streaming platforms, Disney+ viewership ratings are not public. The partnership ended in October 2025.

==== Oceania ====
New Zealand was the first country outside the United Kingdom to screen Doctor Who, beginning in September 1964, and continued to screen the series for many years, including the 2005 revived series that aired on Prime Television from 2005 to 2017. In 2018, the series is aired on Fridays on TVNZ 2, and on TVNZ On Demand on the same episode as the UK. The series moved to TVNZ 1 in 2021, before TVNZ lost the rights to the show altogether in 2022.

In Australia, the show has had a strong fan base since its inception, having been exclusively first run by the Australian Broadcasting Corporation (ABC) from January 1965 until the 2022 specials, when Disney+ became the new exclusive broadcaster for the 2023 specials and later episodes. The ABC has periodically repeated episodes; of note were the daily screenings of all available classic episodes starting in 2003 for the show's 40th anniversary and the weekly screenings of all available revived episodes in 2013 for the show's 50th anniversary. The ABC broadcast the modern series' first run on ABC1 and ABC Me, with repeats on ABC2 and streaming (prior to the 2023 specials) available on ABC iview.

==== Americas ====
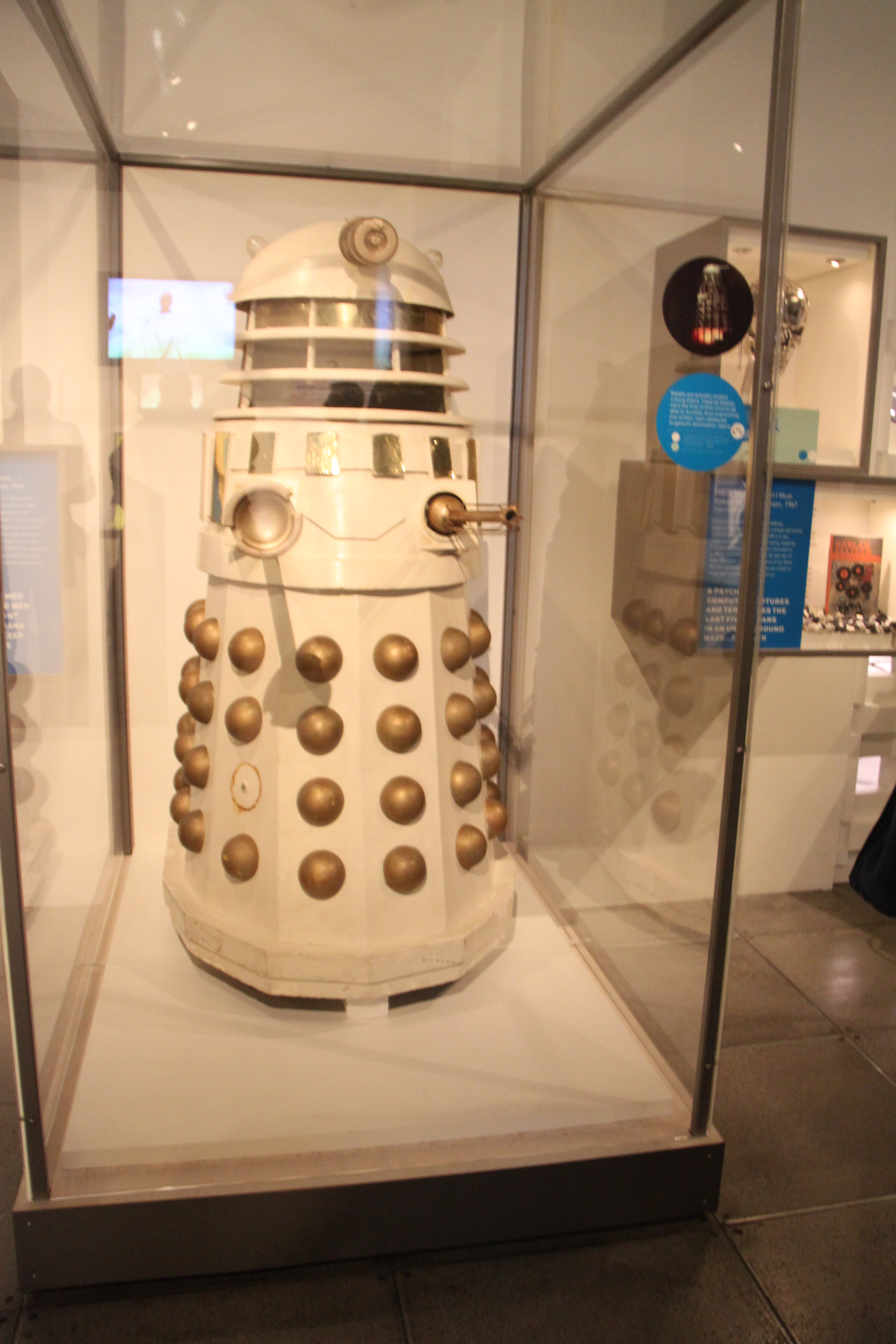
Dalek at the Icons of Science Fiction exhibition held at the Museum of Pop Culture, Seattle

The series also has a fan base in the United States, where it was shown in syndication from the 1970s to the 1990s, particularly on PBS stations.

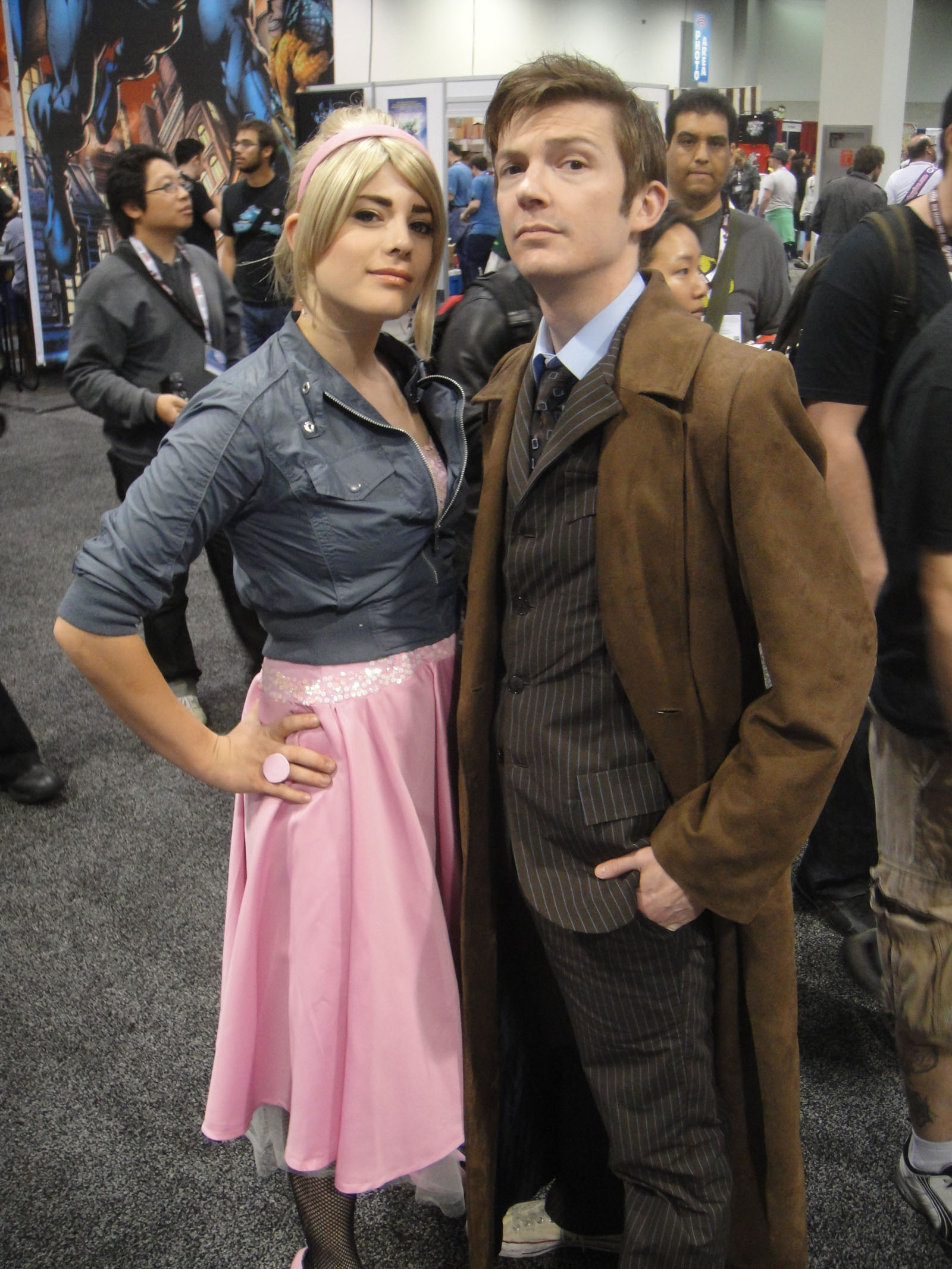
Doctor Who fans cosplay as the Doctor and his companion, Rose, at WonderCon, California.

In Canada, TVOntario picked up the show in 1976, beginning with The Three Doctors and aired each series (several years late) through to series 24 in 1991. From 1979 to 1981, TVO airings were bookended by science-fiction writer Judith Merril, who introduced the episode and then, after the episode concluded, tried to place it in an educational context in keeping with TVO's status as an educational channel. Its airing of The Talons of Weng-Chiang was cancelled as a result of accusations that the story was racist; the story was later broadcast in the 1990s on cable station YTV. CBC began showing the series again in 2005. The series moved to the Canadian cable channel Space in 2009.

Series three began broadcasting on CBC on 18 June 2007 followed by the second Christmas special, "The Runaway Bride", at midnight, and the Sci Fi Channel began on 6 July 2007, starting with the second Christmas special at 8:00 pm E/P followed by the first episode.

Series four aired in the United States on the Sci Fi Channel (now known as Syfy), beginning in April 2008. It aired on CBC beginning 19 September 2008, although the CBC did not air the "Voyage of the Damned" special. The Canadian cable network Space (now known as CTV Sci-Fi Channel) broadcast "The Next Doctor" (in March 2009) and all subsequent series and specials.

The series was aired in Brazil at the TV networks Syfy and, more frequently, at the public broadcaster TV Cultura. Except for international distribution rights holders, it had already been made available on local streaming platforms Looke and Globoplay. Starting from 2024, series 1 through 13 became available on the streaming service +SBT.

==== Asia ====
Series 1 through 3 of Doctor Who were broadcast on various NHK channels from 2006 to 2008 with Japanese subtitles. Beginning on 2 August 2009, upon the launch of Disney XD in Japan, the series has been broadcast with Japanese dubbing.

=== Home media ===
A wide selection of serials is available from BBC Video on DVD, on sale in the United Kingdom, Australia, Canada and the United States. By 2013, every fully extant serial was released on VHS and DVD by BBC Worldwide. (Note: The VHS releases ended in 2003, before copies of episodes 1, 2, 4, 5, and 6 of The Enemy of the World were discovered in 2013.) BBC Worldwide (until 2018) and BBC Studios Home Entertainment (since 2018) released all 15 series of the 2005 revival show on DVD and Blu-ray. Series 1 is also available in its entirety on UMD for the PlayStation Portable. Eight original series serials have been released on LaserDisc and many have also been released on Betamax tape and Video 2000. One episode of Doctor Who (The Infinite Quest) was released on VCD. Initially, only the series from the 2008–2010 specials onwards were also available on Blu-ray, along with Spearhead from Space (1970), released in July 2013, and the 1996 television film, released as a standard definition upscale in September 2016, and as a 4K restoration of the film footage in 2026. However, in 2018 it was announced that the classic run would be released on Blu-ray starting with a box set of season 12. Series 1 through 4 of the revival (2005–2008) were initially only released commercially on DVD, but had two separate Blu-ray upscales in November 2013 and in 2023.

From 2020 until 2025, most of the revival series was available for streaming on HBO Max, as well as spin-offs Sarah Jane Adventures and Torchwood. Since June 2026, the first thirteen series of the revival have been available for streaming on AMC+. Ahead of the 60th anniversary of the series, BBC cleared the rights to allow almost every single non-missing episode of Doctor Who (Note: With the exception of An Unearthly Child. As of June 2025 the rights to Terror of the Zygons and The Seeds of Doom have since expired.) onto iPlayer. Additionally various spin-offs were also added to iPlayer including Torchwood, The Sarah Jane Adventures, Class, and Doctor Who Confidential.

== Adaptations and other appearances ==
=== Films ===
There are two Dr. Who feature films: Dr. Who and the Daleks, released in 1965 and Daleks' Invasion Earth 2150 A.D. in 1966. Both are retellings of existing television stories (specifically, the first two Dalek serials, The Daleks and The Dalek Invasion of Earth respectively) with a larger budget and alterations to the series concept.

In these films, Peter Cushing plays a human scientist named "Dr. Who" who travels with his granddaughter, niece, and other companions in a time machine he has invented. The Cushing version of the character reappears in both comic strips and a short story, the latter attempting to reconcile the film continuity with that of the series. In addition, several planned films were proposed, including a sequel, The Chase, loosely based on the original series story, for the Cushing Doctor, plus many attempted television movie and big-screen productions to revive the original Doctor Who after the original series was cancelled.

In 2011, David Yates announced that he had started work with the BBC on a Doctor Who film, a project that would take three or more years to complete. Yates indicated that the film would take a different approach from Doctor Who, although then showrunner Steven Moffat stated later that any such film would not be a reboot of the series and that a film should be made by the BBC team and star the current TV Doctor.

=== Spin-offs ===
Doctor Who has appeared on stage numerous times. In the early 1970s, Trevor Martin played the role in Doctor Who and the Daleks in the Seven Keys to Doomsday. In the late 1980s, Jon Pertwee and Colin Baker both played the Doctor at different times during the run of a play titled Doctor Who – The Ultimate Adventure. For two performances, while Pertwee was ill, David Banks (better known for playing Cybermen) played the Doctor. Other original plays have been staged as amateur productions, with other actors playing the Doctor, while Terry Nation wrote The Curse of the Daleks, a stage play mounted in the late 1960s, but without the Doctor.

A pilot episode ("A Girl's Best Friend") for a potential spin-off series, K-9 and Company, aired in 1981, with Elisabeth Sladen reprising her role as companion Sarah Jane Smith and John Leeson as the voice of K9, but was not picked up as a regular series. Concept art for an animated Doctor Who series was produced by animation company Nelvana in the 1980s, but the series was not produced.

Following the success of the 2005 series produced by Russell T Davies, the BBC commissioned Davies to produce a 13-part spin-off series titled Torchwood (an anagram of "Doctor Who"), set in modern-day Cardiff and investigating alien activities and crime. The series debuted on BBC Three on 22 October 2006. John Barrowman reprised his role of Jack Harkness from the 2005 series of Doctor Who. Two other actresses who appeared in Doctor Who also star in the series: Eve Myles as Gwen Cooper, who played the similarly named servant girl Gwyneth in the 2005 Doctor Who episode "The Unquiet Dead", and Naoko Mori, who reprised her role as Toshiko Sato, first seen in "Aliens of London". A second series of Torchwood aired in 2008; for three episodes, the cast was joined by Freema Agyeman, reprising her Doctor Who role of Martha Jones. A third series was broadcast from 6 to 10 July 2009, and consisted of a single five-part story called Children of Earth which was set largely in London. A fourth series, Torchwood: Miracle Day jointly produced by BBC Wales, BBC Worldwide and the American entertainment company Starz, debuted in 2011. The series was predominantly set in the United States, though Wales remained part of the show's setting.

The Sarah Jane Adventures, starring Sladen who again reprised her role as Sarah Jane, was developed by CBBC; a special aired on New Year's Day 2007, and a full series began on 24 September 2007. A second series followed in 2008, featuring the return of Brigadier Lethbridge-Stewart. A third in 2009 featured a crossover appearance from the main show by David Tennant as the Tenth Doctor. In 2010, a fourth season featured Matt Smith as the Eleventh Doctor alongside former companion actress Katy Manning reprising her role as Jo Grant. A final, three-story fifth series was transmitted in autumn 2011 – uncompleted due to Sladen's death in early 2011.

An animated serial, The Infinite Quest, aired alongside the 2007 series of Doctor Who as part of the children's television series Totally Doctor Who. The serial featured the voices of series regulars David Tennant and Freema Agyeman but is not considered part of the 2007 series. A second animated serial, Dreamland, aired in six parts on the BBC Red Button service, and the official Doctor Who website in 2009.

Class, featuring students of Coal Hill School, aired online on BBC Three for one series in 2016. It was written by Patrick Ness. Peter Capaldi as the Twelfth Doctor appears in the show's first episode.

The War Between the Land and the Sea is a spin-off miniseries written by Russell T Davies and Pete McTighe, directed by Dylan Holmes Williams, and starring Russell Tovey as Barclay and Gugu Mbatha-Raw as the Sea Devil Salt, characters who are not connected to Tovey's and Mbatha-Raw's previous Doctor Who roles. The War Between the Land and the Sea involves an international crisis involving humans and Sea Devils. It aired on BBC One in 2025 and will air on Disney+ in 2026. Jemma Redgrave, Alexander Devrient, and Ruth Madeley returned to reprise their roles from Doctor Who as Kate Lethbridge-Stewart, Colonel Ibrahim, and Shirley Anne Bingham. Colin McFarlane reprised his role from Torchwood: Children of Earth as General Pierce.

Numerous other spin-off series have been created not by the BBC but by the respective owners of the characters and concepts. Such spin-offs include the novel and audio drama series Faction Paradox, Iris Wildthyme and Bernice Summerfield; as well as the made-for-video series P.R.O.B.E.; the Australian-produced television series K-9, which aired a 26-episode first season on Disney XD; and the audio spin-off Counter-Measures. In December 2025, the contract for production of Doctor Who: TARDIS Crew, an animated spin-off of Doctor Who for pre-school audiences to air on CBeebies was awarded to Blue Zoo Animation Studio, with the 52 episodes to be split across two series. Subsidiary company Brighton Zoo will also work on the series, which entered production in August 2026.

=== Aftershows ===
When the revived series of Doctor Who was brought back, an aftershow series was created by the BBC, titled Doctor Who Confidential. There have been five aftershow series created, with the latest one titled Doctor Who: Unleashed, which began airing from the 60th anniversary specials. Each series follows behind-the-scenes footage on the making of Doctor Who through clips and interviews with the cast, production crew and other people, including those who have participated in the television series in some manner. Each episode deals with a different topic, and in most cases refers to the Doctor Who episode that preceded it.

Series	Doctor Who series	Episodes	Originally released	Narrator / Presenter
Doctor Who Confidential	1–6	87	26 May 2005 – 1 October 2011	Simon Pegg (2005); Mark Gatiss (2005–2006); Anthony Head (2006–2010); Noel Clarke (2009); Alex Price (2010); Russell Tovey (2010–2011)
Doctor Who Extra	8–9; 2015–16 specials	24	23 August 2014 – 5 December 2015	Matt Botten; Rufus Hound; Matt Lucas; Charity Wakefield
Doctor Who: The Fan Show	9–10	18	8 June 2015 – 3 August 2018	Christel Dee (main host); Luke Spillane (co-host)
Doctor Who Access All Areas	10	11	13 October – 13 December 2018	Yinka Bokinni
Whovians	10–12	32	16 April 2017 – 5 March 2020	Rove McManus
Doctor Who: Unleashed	2023 specials; 14–15	24	17 November 2023 – 7 June 2025	Steffan Powell

=== Charity episodes and appearances ===
In 1983, coinciding with the series' 20th anniversary, "The Five Doctors" was shown as part of the annual BBC Children in Need Appeal; however, it was not a charity-based production, simply scheduled within the line-up of Friday 25 November 1983. This was the programme's first co-production with Australian broadcaster ABC. At 90 minutes long, it was the longest single episode of Doctor Who produced to date. It featured three of the first five Doctors, a new actor to replace the deceased William Hartnell, and unused footage to represent Tom Baker.

In 1993, for the franchise's 30th anniversary, another charity special, Dimensions in Time, was produced for Children in Need, featuring all the surviving actors who played the Doctor and a number of previous companions. It also featured a crossover with the soap opera EastEnders, the action taking place in the latter's Albert Square location and around Greenwich. The special was one of several special 3D programmes the BBC produced at the time, using a 3D system that made use of the Pulfrich effect, requiring glasses with one darkened lens; the picture would look normal to those viewers who watched without the glasses.

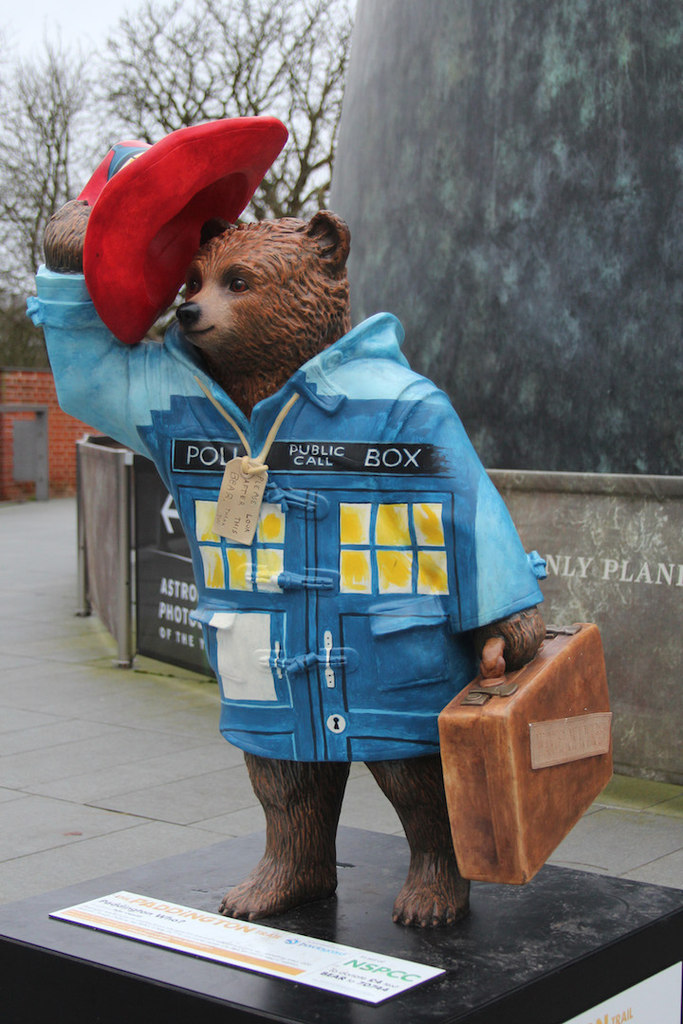
Doctor Who-themed Paddington Bear statue at the Royal Observatory, London, in 2014. Designed by the Twelfth Doctor Peter Capaldi, it was auctioned for the National Society for the Prevention of Cruelty to Children (NSPCC).

In 1999, another special, Doctor Who and the Curse of Fatal Death, was made for Comic Relief and later released on VHS. An affectionate parody of the television series, it was split into four segments, mimicking the traditional serial format, complete with cliffhangers, and running down the same corridor several times when being chased (the version released on video was split into only two episodes). In the story, the Doctor (Rowan Atkinson) encounters both the Master (Jonathan Pryce) and the Daleks. During the special, the Doctor is forced to regenerate several times, with his subsequent incarnations played by, in order, Richard E. Grant, Jim Broadbent, Hugh Grant, and Joanna Lumley. The script was written by Steven Moffat, the head writer and executive producer of the revived series from 2010–2017.

Since the return of Doctor Who in 2005, the franchise has produced four original "mini-episodes" to support Children in Need. The first, which aired in November 2005, was an untitled seven-minute scene introducing David Tennant as the Tenth Doctor. It was followed in November 2007 by "Time Crash", a seven-minute scene that featured the Tenth Doctor meeting the Fifth Doctor (Peter Davison). Children in Need 2012 featured the mini-episode "The Great Detective". Children in Need 2023 featured the mini-episode "Destination: Skaro", which served as the introduction of David Tennant as the Fourteenth Doctor.

A set of two mini-episodes, titled "Space" and "Time" respectively, was produced to support Comic Relief. They were aired during the Comic Relief 2011 event. During Children in Need 2011, an exclusively filmed segment showed the Doctor addressing the viewer, attempting to persuade them to purchase items of his clothing, which were going up for auction for Children in Need. In 2014, the Peter Capaldi, who played the Twelfth Doctor, designed a Doctor Who-themed Paddington Bear statue, which was located at the Royal Observatory in Greenwich (one of 50 placed around London), which was auctioned to raise funds for the National Society for the Prevention of Cruelty to Children (NSPCC).

The TARDIS appeared in a pre-recorded sequence during the Opening Ceremony of the 2026 Commonwealth Games, piloted by Sir Chris Hoy and Greg McHugh, who commandeered it to transport King Charles III and Queen Camilla to the ceremony, leaving a bewildered Seventh Doctor to discover its absence. The TARDIS then materialised at various wrong locations around Scotland, including Loch Ness, The Kelpies and Edinburgh Castle, before finally arriving at Balmoral Castle to collect the King and Queen. The pre-recorded segment ended with the TARDIS "materialising" live on stage inside the OVO Hydro. In a moment described as "surreal", Sir Chris Hoy exited the TARDIS, followed by the King and Queen, who were met with cheers from the audience. The segment was released the same day on YouTube.

=== Spoofs and cultural references ===
Doctor Who has been satirised and spoofed on many occasions by comedians, including Spike Milligan (a Dalek invades his bathroom—Milligan, naked, hurls a soap sponge at it) and Lenny Henry. Jon Culshaw frequently impersonates the Fourth Doctor in the BBC Dead Ringers series. Doctor Who fandom has also been lampooned on programs such as Saturday Night Live, The Chaser's War on Everything, Mystery Science Theater 3000, Family Guy, American Dad!, Futurama, South Park, Community as Inspector Spacetime, The Simpsons and The Big Bang Theory. As part of the 50th-anniversary programmes, former Fifth Doctor Peter Davison directed, wrote, and co-starred in the parody The Five(ish) Doctors Reboot, which also starred two other former Doctors, Colin Baker and Sylvester McCoy, and had cameo appearances from cast and crew involved in the programme, including showrunner Steven Moffat and Doctors Paul McGann, David Tennant, and Matt Smith.

There have also been many references to Doctor Who in popular culture and other science fiction, including Star Trek: The Next Generation ("The Neutral Zone") and Leverage. In the Channel 4 series Queer as Folk (created by Russell T Davies, Doctor Who executive producer from 2005–2010 and since 2023), the character of Vince was portrayed as an avid Doctor Who fan, with references appearing many times throughout in the form of clips from the programme. In a similar manner, the character of Oliver on Coupling (created and written by Moffat) is portrayed as a Doctor Who collector and enthusiast. References to Doctor Who have also appeared in the young adult fantasy novels Brisingr and High Wizardry, the video game Rock Band, the Adult Swim comedy show Robot Chicken, the Family Guy episodes "Blue Harvest" and "420", and the game RuneScape. It has also been referenced in Destroy All Humans! 2, by civilians in the game's variation of England, and multiple times throughout the Ace Attorney series. It has been featured in Good Omens through the first Doctor Who Annual.

Doctor Who has been a reference in several political cartoons, from a 1964 cartoon in the Daily Mail depicting Charles de Gaulle as a Dalek to a 2008 edition of This Modern World by Tom Tomorrow in which the Tenth Doctor informs an incredulous character from 2003 that the Democratic Party will nominate an African-American as its presidential candidate.

The word "TARDIS" is an entry in the Shorter Oxford English Dictionary.

=== Audio ===
The earliest Doctor Who–related audio release was a 21-minute narrated abridgement of the First Doctor television story The Chase released in 1966. Ten years later, the first original Doctor Who audio was released on LP record; Doctor Who and the Pescatons featuring the Fourth Doctor. The first commercially available audiobook was an abridged reading of the Fourth Doctor story State of Decay in 1981. In 1985, during a hiatus in the television show, Slipback, the first radio drama was transmitted.

Since the late 1990s, Big Finish Productions has produced audio plays based on Doctor Who and its spinoffs. Tom Baker, Peter Davison, Colin Baker, Sylvester McCoy, Paul McGann, Christopher Eccleston, David Tennant, John Hurt, Jodie Whittaker and Jo Martin have reprised their role as The Doctor in these dramas, as have many of the companions and regular supporting actors from the programmes history. (Note: Jon Pertwee's voice is featured posthumously in the 40th-anniversary story Zagreus) The main range, Doctor Who: The Monthly Adventures, holds the Guinness World Record for the longest-running science fiction audio play series. In 2020 Big Finish revealed that The Monthly Adventures would come to an end in favour of individual box sets.

In 2022, BBC Sounds began airing Doctor Who: Redacted, a podcast written by Juno Dawson and starring Charlie Craggs and Jodie Whittaker. The podcast focuses on a trio of friends who host a paranormal conspiracy podcast, "The Blue Box Files", and end up getting involved in much more than they expected. The podcast was later renewed for a second series.

=== Books ===
Doctor Who books have been published since 1964. Until 1991, the books published were primarily novelised adaptations of broadcast episodes; (Note: Various scripts that were written but not broadcast had also been novelised from 1989–2019 starting with The Nightmare Fair in 1989.) beginning in 1991, an extensive line of original fiction was launched, the Virgin New Adventures and Virgin Missing Adventures. Since the relaunch of the programme in 2005, a new range of novels has been published by BBC Books, followed by further novelisations from 2018 after the original run by Target Books ended in 1994. (Note: Individual novelisations of the 1996 television film and the serials City of Death (1979) and The Pirate Planet (1978) were printed in the interim, but not as part of a regular range nor under the Target Books imprint. Reworked paperback versions of these three books became part of the Target collection in 2018–2021.) Numerous non-fiction books about the series, including guidebooks and critical studies, have also been published, and a dedicated Doctor Who Magazine (DWM) with newsstand circulation has been published regularly since 1979: DWM is recognised by Guinness World Records as the longest running TV tie-in magazine, celebrating 40 years of continuous publication on 11 October 2019. Panini has published the magazine since the 1990s. In 2006, Doctor Who Adventures, a magazine for younger fans, was launched by BBC Magazines.

=== Video games ===
Numerous Doctor Who video games have been created since the mid-1980s. A Doctor Who game was planned for the Sega Mega Drive but never released.

Doctor Who: Legacy was a match-3 game released in November 2013 for iOS, Android, Amazon App Store and Facebook. It was regularly updated from its release until 2019. It featured all the Doctors up until its discontinuation as playable characters as well as over 100 companions.

Another video game instalment is Lego Dimensions – in which Doctor Who is one of the many "Level Packs" in the game. The pack contains the Twelfth Doctor (who can reincarnate into the others), K9, the TARDIS and a Victorian London adventure level area. The game and pack were released in November 2015.

Doctor Who: Battle of Time was a digital collectible card game developed by Bandai Namco Entertainment and released for iOS and Android. It was soft-launched on 30 May 2018 in Australia, Canada, New Zealand, Thailand, but was shut down on 26 November of that same year.

Doctor Who Infinity was released on Steam on 7 August 2018. It was nominated for "Best Start-up" at The Independent Game Developers' Association Awards 2018.

=== Chronology and canonicity ===
The BBC takes no position on the canonicity of any Doctor Who stories, and producers of the show have expressed distaste for the idea of canonicity.

== Awards ==
The show has received recognition as one of Britain's finest television programmes, winning the 2006 British Academy Television Award for Best Drama Series and five consecutive (2005–2010) awards at the National Television Awards during Russell T Davies' first tenure as executive producer. In 2011, Matt Smith became the first Doctor to be nominated for a BAFTA Television Award for Best Actor, and in 2016, Michelle Gomez became the first woman to receive a BAFTA nomination for the series, getting a Best Supporting Actress nomination for her work as Missy.

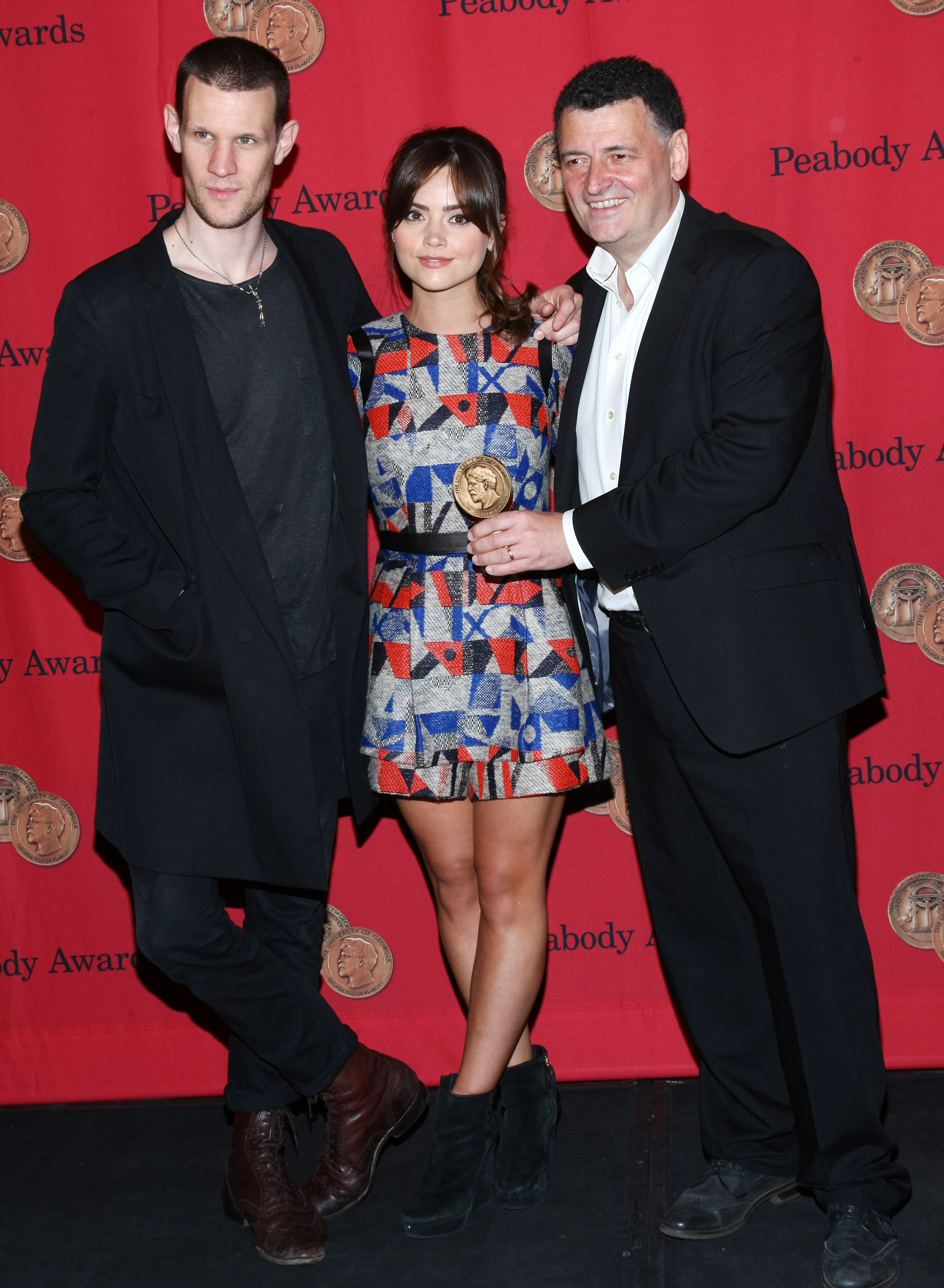
Matt Smith, Jenna-Louise Coleman and Steven Moffat accepting a Peabody Award for Doctor Who in 2013

In 2013, the Peabody Awards honoured Doctor Who with an Institutional Peabody "for evolving with technology and the times like nothing else in the known television universe." The programme is listed in Guinness World Records as the longest-running science-fiction television show in the world, as the "most successful" science-fiction series of all time, based on its overall broadcast ratings, DVD and book sales, and iTunes traffic, and for the largest ever simulcast of a TV drama with its 50th-anniversary special.

In 1975, Season 11 of the series won a Writers' Guild of Great Britain award for Best Writing in a Children's Serial. In 1996, BBC television held the "Auntie Awards" as the culmination of their "TV60" series, celebrating 60 years of BBC television broadcasting, where Doctor Who was voted as the "Best Popular Drama" the corporation had ever produced, ahead of such ratings heavyweights as EastEnders and Casualty. In 2000, Doctor Who was ranked third in a list of the 100 Greatest British Television Programmes of the 20th century, produced by the British Film Institute and voted on by industry professionals. In 2005, the series came first in a survey by SFX magazine of "The Greatest UK Science Fiction and Fantasy Television Series Ever". In Channel 4's 2001 list of the 100 Greatest Kids' TV shows, Doctor Who was placed at number nine. In 2004 and 2007, Doctor Who was ranked number 18 and number 22 on TV Guide's Top Cult Shows Ever. In 2013, TV Guide ranked it as the sixth-best sci-fi show.

The revived series has received recognition from critics and the public across various awards ceremonies. It won eight BAFTA TV Awards, including Best Drama Series, the highest-profile and most prestigious British television award for which the series has ever been nominated. It was very popular at the BAFTA Cymru Awards, with 33 wins overall including Best Drama Series (twice), Best Screenplay/Screenwriter (three times) and Best Actor (twice). It was also nominated for 7 Saturn Awards, winning the only Best International Series in the ceremony's history. In 2009, Doctor Who was voted the 3rd greatest show of the 2000s by Channel 4, behind Top Gear and The Apprentice. The episode "Vincent and the Doctor" was shortlisted for a Mind Award at the 2010 Mind Mental Health Media Awards for its "touching" portrayal of Vincent van Gogh.

It has won the Short Form of the Hugo Award for Best Dramatic Presentation, the oldest science fiction/fantasy award for films and series, six times since 2006. The winning episodes were "The Empty Child"/"The Doctor Dances" (2006), "The Girl in the Fireplace" (2007), "Blink" (2008), "The Waters of Mars" (2010), "The Pandorica Opens"/"The Big Bang" (2011), and "The Doctor's Wife" (2012). The 2016 Christmas special "The Return of Doctor Mysterio" was also a finalist for the 2017 Hugo Awards. Doctor Who star Matt Smith won Best Actor in the 2012 National Television awards alongside Karen Gillan, who won Best Actress.

As a British series, the majority of its nominations and awards have been for national competitions such as the BAFTAs, but it has occasionally received nominations in mainstream American awards, most notably a nomination for "Favourite Sci-Fi Show" in the 2008 People's Choice Awards, and the series has been nominated multiple times in the Spike Scream Awards, with Smith winning Best Science Fiction Actor in 2011. The Canadian Constellation Awards have also recognised the series. In 2019, Doctor Who was inducted into the Science Fiction Hall of Fame based in Seattle, Washington.

== See also ==
- Time travel in fiction
- List of Welsh television series
