= Whovians (TV series) =

2017–2020 Australian TV series

- Directed by: Jon Olb; Todd Decker (season 3)
- Presented by: Rove McManus
- Starring: Tegan Higginbotham; Adam Richard; Steven O'Donnell
- Country of origin: Australia
- Original language: English
- No. of seasons: 3
- No. of episodes: 32

Production
- Running time: 30 minutes

Original release
- Network: ABC TV Plus
- Release: 16 April 2017 – 5 March 2020

Whovians is an Australian comedy panel chat show hosted by Rove McManus, which screens on ABC. Rove engages with a team of four celebrity "Whovians", that is fans of science fiction television series Doctor Who, to analyse, critique and unravel the mysteries of the program. The first episode screened on 16 April 2017 on ABC TV Plus as a companion piece to the first episode of the tenth series of Doctor Who after it aired on ABC. The second season began 8 October 2018 on ABC TV Plus as a companion piece to the first episode of the eleventh series.

The show regularly features fans such as Tegan Higginbotham, Adam Richard, Steven "Bajo" O'Donnell and Justin Hamilton. Guest fans have included Geraldine Quinn, Jordan Raskopoulos, Stephen Conroy, Alice Fraser, Petra Elliott, Rhianna Patrick, Yassmin Abdel-Magied, Tasma Walton, Paul Verhoeven, Bridie Connell, Celia Pacquola, Dave Callan, Cal Wilson and Stewart "Stav" Davidson.

== Regular segments ==
Each season includes a number of regular opinion pieces, comedy segments and video packages. These have included:

- He Who Knows Who News - presented by Justin Hamilton (season 1)
- Thirteenth Doctor Auditions by ABC Celebrities (season 1)
- The Vault (season 1)
- The Moment (seasons 2 & 3)
- This Week In Who-story (season 3)
- WHOse Show (season 3)
- Rove talks candidly to Doctor Who characters (season 3)

== Episode list ==
Series	Episodes	Originally released	
Series	Episodes	First released	Last released
1	13	16 April 2017	27 December 2017
2	10	8 October 2018	10 December 2018
3	9	9 January 2020	5 March 2020

== Episodes ==
=== Season 1 (2017) ===
- Note: Italicized names are guests to the panel.

No. overall	No. in season	Doctor Who episode	Panel	Original release date
1	1	"The Pilot"	Tegan Higginbotham, Adam Richard, Steven O'Donnell, Geraldine Quinn	16 April 2017
2	2	"Smile"	Tegan Higginbotham, Adam Richard, Steven O'Donnell, Jordan Raskopoulos	23 April 2017
3	3	"Thin Ice"	Adam Richard, Geraldine Quinn, Cal Wilson, Stephen Conroy, Sarah Dollard	30 April 2017
4	4	"Knock Knock"	Tegan Higginbotham, Adam Richard, Steven O'Donnell, Alice Fraser, David Suchet	7 May 2017
5	5	"Oxygen"	Tegan Higginbotham, Adam Richard, Steven O'Donnell, Petra Elliott, George Christensen	14 May 2017
6	6	"Extremis"	Adam Richard, Steven O'Donnell, Yassmin Abdel-Magied, Rhianna Patrick, Daniel Nettheim	21 May 2017
7	7	"The Pyramid at the End of the World"	Tegan Higginbotham, Adam Richard, Tasma Walton, Paul Voerhovan, Steven Moffat	28 May 2017
8	8	"The Lie of the Land"	Tegan Higginbotham, Adam Richard, Jordan Raskopoulos, Bridie Connell, Pearl Mackie	4 June 2017
9	9	"Empress of Mars"	Adam Richard, Steven O'Donnell, Celia Pacquola, Dave Callan, Mark Gatiss	11 June 2017
10	10	"The Eaters of Light"	Tegan Higginbotham, Adam Richard, Cal Wilson, Stav Davidson, Hayley Nebauer	18 June 2017
11	11	"World Enough and Time"	Tegan Higginbotham, Adam Richard, Steven O'Donnell, Bridie Connell	25 June 2017
12	12	"The Doctor Falls"	Tegan Higginbotham, Adam Richard, Steven O'Donnell, Jordan Raskopoulos, Alexandra Tynan, Steven Moffat	2 July 2017
13	13	"Twice Upon a Time"	Tegan Higginbotham, Adam Richard, Steven O'Donnell, Cal Wilson, Steven Moffat	27 December 2017

=== Season 2 (2018) ===
No. overall	No. in season	Doctor Who episode	Panel	Original release date
14	1	"The Woman Who Fell to Earth"	Adam Richard, Tegan Higginbotham, Cal Wilson, Bridie Connell	8 October 2018
15	2	"The Ghost Monument"	Adam Richard, Tegan Higginbotham, Steven O'Donnell, Tessa Waters	15 October 2018
16	3	"Rosa"	Adam Richard, Tegan Higginbotham, Steven O'Donnell, Rhianna Patrick	22 October 2018
17	4	"Arachnids in the UK"	Adam Richard, Tegan Higginbotham, Cal Wilson, Dave Callan	29 October 2018
18	5	"The Tsuranga Conundrum"	Adam Richard, Tegan Higginbotham, Steven O'Donnell, Jordan Raskopoulos	5 November 2018
19	6	"Demons of the Punjab"	Adam Richard, Tegan Higginbotham, Steven O'Donnell, Michelle Brasier	12 November 2018
20	7	"Kerblam!"	Adam Richard, Tegan Higginbotham, Steven O'Donnell, Bridie Connell, Jason Haigh-Ellery	19 November 2018
21	8	"The Witchfinders"	Adam Richard, Celia Pacquola, Tegan Higginbotham, Steven O'Donnell	26 November 2018
22	9	"It Takes You Away"	Adam Richard, Cal Wilson, Tegan Higginbotham, Jordan Raskopoulos, Steven O'Donnell	3 December 2018
23	10	"The Battle of Ranskoor Av Kolos"	Adam Richard, Tegan Higginbotham, Steven O'Donnell, Bridie Connell, Tim Shaw	10 December 2018

=== Season 3 (2020) ===
On 17 December 2019, ABC Comedy announced that Whovians would be back following part two of the New Years Special.

No. overall	No. in season	Doctor Who episode	Panel	Original release date
24	1	"Spyfall"	Tegan Higginbotham, Steven O'Donnell, Justin Hamilton, Bridie Connell	9 January 2020
25	2	"Orphan 55"	Tegan Higginbotham, Steven O'Donnell, Justin Hamilton, Cal Wilson	16 January 2020
26	3	"Nikola Tesla's Night of Terror"	Tegan Higginbotham, Steven O'Donnell, Michelle Brasier, Georgie Carroll	23 January 2020
27	4	"Fugitive of the Judoon"	Tegan Higginbotham, Steven O'Donnell, Dylan Lewis, Greta Lee Jackson	30 January 2020
28	5	"Praxeus"	Tegan Higginbotham, Justin Hamilton, Merrick Watts, Tasma Walton	6 February 2020
29	6	"Can You Hear Me?"	Tegan Higginbotham, Steven O'Donnell, Justin Hamilton, Bridie Connell	13 February 2020
30	7	"The Haunting of Villa Diodati"	Tegan Higginbotham, Steven O'Donnell, Angharad "Rad" Yeo, Dave Callan	20 February 2020
31	8	"Ascension of the Cybermen"	Tegan Higginbotham, Steven O'Donnell, Jordan Raskopoulos, Dylan Lewis	27 February 2020
32	9	"The Timeless Children"	Tegan Higginbotham, Steven O'Donnell, Andrew Hansen, Luke McGregor, Angharad "Rad" Yeo	5 March 2020

== Future series ==
2021 On 30 December 2020, Rove McManus hinted on Twitter that Whovians would be returning for a fourth season in 2021.

However, Whovians didn't return to ABC TV due to the COVID-19 pandemic.

Instead the Newcastle Local Group from the Doctor Who Club of Australia organised a panel from the Whovians team running on Zoom to discuss each episode of Doctor Who: Flux which aired on ABC TV in late 2021.

=== 2023 ===
In a 2023 interview, Adam Richard reflected on his time hosting Whovians, noting that the first series was a learning experience as the show was essentially live, recorded and aired on the same day. He described it as a fun environment, but also mentioned the challenge of receiving early, unfinished Doctor Who episodes, sometimes with visible watermarks or incomplete effects, which he found difficult as a fan.

Richard appreciated the show's live format but expressed frustration with the way Doctor Who was being handled by the ABC. He criticised the poor quality of broadcasts on the network's multi-channel, which he felt didn't do justice to the show's high production values. Despite these challenges, Richard maintained a positive view of Whovians and his role on the show.

== Reception ==
The Sydney Morning Herald said that "Rove McManus' dissection [of each episode of Dr Who] afterwards is a fun and factoid-filled debrief."
