= The Eaters of Light =

274 – "The Eaters of Light"
- Doctor Who episode

Cast
- Doctor: Peter Capaldi – Twelfth Doctor
- Companions: Pearl Mackie – Bill Potts; Matt Lucas – Nardole
- Others: Michelle Gomez – Missy; Rebecca Benson – Kar; Daniel Kerr – Ban; Brian Vernel – Lucius; Rohan Nedd – Simon; Ben Hunter – Thracius; Sam Adewunmi – Vitus; Billy Matthews – Cornelius; Aaron Phagura – Marcus; Jocelyn Brassington – Judy; Lewis McGowan – Brother

Production
- Directed by: Charles Palmer
- Written by: Rona Munro
- Produced by: Nikki Wilson
- Executive producers: Steven Moffat; Brian Minchin
- Music by: Murray Gold
- Series: Series 10
- Running time: 42 minutes
- First broadcast: 17 June 2017

Chronology
← Preceded by "Empress of Mars"	Followed by → "World Enough and Time"

"The Eaters of Light" is the tenth episode of the tenth series of the British science fiction television series Doctor Who. It was written by Rona Munro and broadcast on 17 June 2017 on BBC One. Munro previously wrote Survival, the final serial of the original run of Doctor Who, making her the only writer to date to have worked on the classic and revived eras of the show. The episode received generally positive reviews from television critics.

The Doctor (Peter Capaldi) takes Bill (Pearl Mackie) and Nardole (Matt Lucas) to second-century Scotland to settle their different theories about what happened to the ninth legion of the Roman army that vanished. When they arrive, however, they find an alien menace from another dimension that may be the reason behind the vanishing, presenting a far greater threat than any army.

== Synopsis ==
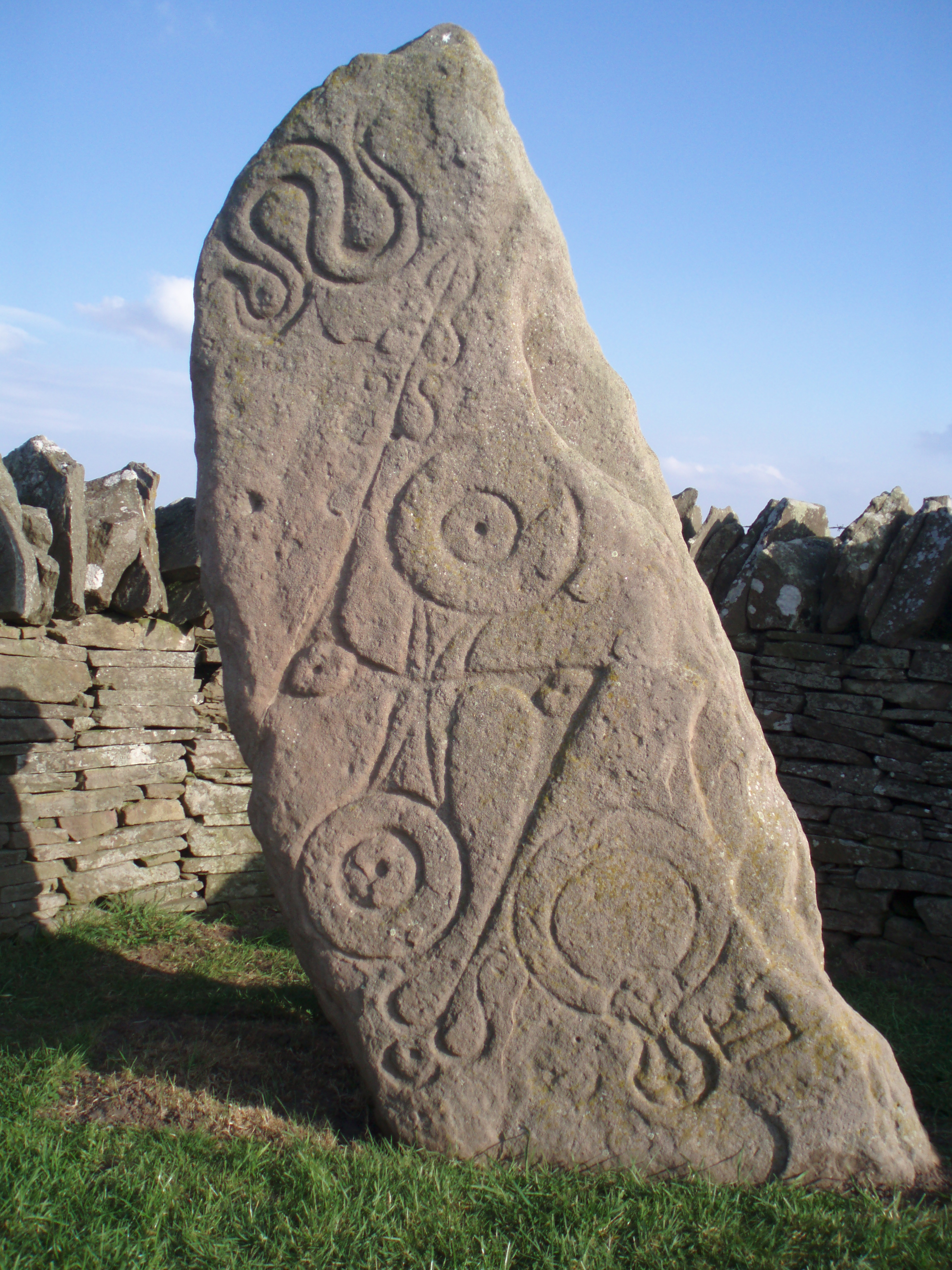
The Picts, who left their legacy through monumental stones like the one pictured, are featured in this episode.

The Twelfth Doctor and Bill, disagreeing about the fate of the Ninth Legion of the Imperial Roman army, travel in the TARDIS along with Nardole to the 2nd century in Scotland to prove the other wrong. Bill goes her own way to find the Legion, while the Doctor and Nardole look for their dead bodies.

Bill encounters some of the Legion's soldiers hiding underground, the TARDIS' translation circuits helping her communicate with them. The soldiers are hiding from a "Light Eating Locust" that seems drawn to any light source, killing those in its path. Meanwhile, the Doctor and Nardole discover the boneless corpses of the remaining Legion. They later come across a Pict tribe guarding a cairn and waiting for Kar, their leader and the "Guardian of the Gate". The Doctor impatiently enters the cairn, passing into an interdimensional portal full of creatures feeding off a light source. He comes out seconds later, but finds that more than two days have actually passed. Kar explains that once a generation, a warrior of their tribe goes through the cairn to defeat an "Eater of Light", but with the invading Roman army, she allowed one to escape to fight them. The Doctor warns her that unless they can get the creature back into the portal and close it, more of its kind will escape and consume the sun and all the stars in the universe.

Bill leads the surviving legion away from the creature and ends up near the cairn, reuniting with the Doctor and Nardole. The Romans and Picts all agree their squabble is childish given the larger threat. The Doctor works out a plan to lure the Eater back to the portal during daylight. Once the creature is trapped, the Doctor tells them someone needs to stay within the portal until the sun extinguishes to prevent the creature from escaping, but as human life spans are too short, he prepares to enter the portal himself, since his Time Lord physiology and regenerative abilities will protect him. Bill objects and knocks him down, while Kar and the remaining Ninth Legion instead sacrifice themselves as a group to stop the creatures, despite the Doctor's objections.

With the portal closed, the remaining Picts honour Kar's memory in monumental stones and by teaching the crows to say her name, which Nardole observes continues into the present day. Back in the TARDIS, Missy awaits their return, to the surprise of Bill and Nardole.

=== Continuity ===
Nardole mentions the Mary Celeste to Kar's followers as an example of people mysteriously disappearing. His tale of the ship's fate contradicts the First Doctor story The Chase (1965), where Daleks board the ship and frighten the crew into the water.

== Production ==
The read-through for "The Eaters of Light" was on 12 October 2016, with the main shooting taking place from 2 November to 22 November 2016.

=== Writing ===
Moffat announced in October 2016 that a writer who had previously written for the classic series would be returning to write an episode, later confirmed as Rona Munro, who previously wrote the Seventh Doctor story Survival, the final serial of both Season 26 and the classic series. She is the first writer to write for both the classic series and the revived series.

== Broadcast and reception ==
The episode was watched by 2.89 million viewers overnight, the programme's lowest overnight rating in its post-2005 history at the time of its airing, after the rating for "The Lie of the Land" which was watched by 3.01 million viewers overnight. Its audience share was 22%. The episode received 4.73 million views overall, the programme's lowest rating at the time since its return in 2005. It was the twenty-sixth most watched programme of the week and had an audience share of 30.3%. It received an Appreciation Index of 81.

=== Critical reception ===
Professional ratings
Aggregate scores
Source	Rating
Rotten Tomatoes (Average Score)	7.7/10
Rotten Tomatoes (Tomatometer)	100%
Review scores
Source	Rating
The A.V. Club	B+
Entertainment Weekly	B+
SFX Magazine	4/5 stars
TV Fanatic	3.3/5 stars
IGN	8.3
New York Magazine	4/5 stars
Radio Times	5/5 stars

The collective press opinion for "The Eaters of Light" was quoted as "solid, if flawed". The episode has 100% positive reviews based on 15 reviews on Rotten Tomatoes, with the site's consensus stating "'The Eaters of Light' emphasizes the Doctor's most relatable characteristics with an episode whose timely political subtext is nestled neatly within compelling drama."

Alasdair Wilkins of The A.V. Club gave the episode a grade of B+, praising veteran writer Rona Munro on her script, and how she "skilfully mixes the political and the personal", specifically on the usage of the Roman army and the complexity of the characters of the soldiers. He stated how the episode felt like a throwback to a different era of the show, given Munro's being the first writer of the classic era to return to write for the modern era. He felt that criticisms of the previous episode applied to this episode as well, in light of the "retro" feel of the episode. Wilkins felt that the episode was "bizarre", in a positive manner, and that it had a "tremendous, distinctive atmosphere".

Kathleen Wiedel of TV Fanatic gave the episode 3.3 stars out of 5. She felt that it was a solid episode with plenty to enjoy in terms of the story, including Nardole's inclusion with the natives, the Doctor's talking about the crows, and Bill and her discovery of the TARDIS' ability to translate. She commented on the predictability of what would happen when the Doctor declared that he would guard the gate – how the viewers would expect that the supporting cast would take his place instead.

Scott Collura from IGN gave the episode a rating of 8.3. He especially praised the supporting cast of the Romans and Scots, and how they were an improvement compared with the weaker supporting cast and characters of the previous episodes in the series. Collura commented on the amusement of the conversation between Bill and Lucius regarding his romantic intentions, and the girl Kar with her pain and history of having lost everything. He commented on how the mixture of the supporting characters, the "over-the-top monster", and the stand-alone factor of the episode all contributed towards a better episode in a somewhat forgettable series.

Patrick Mulkern from Radio Times gave the episode a perfect score, calling the script "beautifully written". He stated that the "authorial" voice of Munro was the most rewarding aspect of the programme as a whole, and how well she had adapted the story for a "half-remembered" myth. He compared a lot of the episode to Survival, Munro's previous episode of the classic era, including "adolescents running wild without adult guidance and ultimately become an elegy for a generation of lost youth". Mulkern complimented Bill in the episode, especially regarding her realization of the TARDIS' translation and the discussion on sexuality with the Romans. He also complimented Capaldi's portrayal of the Doctor, and how he did what the Doctor does best: take authority and throw himself into danger.

=== In print ===
The Eaters of Light
- Author: Rona Munro
- Series: Doctor Who book: Target novelisations
- Publisher: BBC Books
- Publication date: 14 July 2022
- ISBN: 978-1785947933

A novelisation of this story written by Rona Munro was released in paperback 14 July 2022 as part of the Target Collection.
