= Doctor Who series 10 =

2017 season of British sci-fi TV series

Doctor Who
- Series 10
- DVD box set cover art
- Showrunner: Steven Moffat
- Starring: Peter Capaldi; Pearl Mackie; Matt Lucas
- No. of stories: 11
- No. of episodes: 12 (+2 specials)

Release
- Original network: BBC One
- Original release: 15 April – 1 July 2017

Series chronology
- ← Previous; Series 9 Next → Series 11

The tenth series of the British science fiction television programme Doctor Who premiered on 15 April 2017 and concluded on 1 July 2017 with twelve episodes, after it was formally announced in July 2015. The series is led by head writer and executive producer Steven Moffat, alongside executive producer Brian Minchin. It is the third and final series overseen by the two as executive producers, as well as Moffat's sixth and final series as head writer. This series is the tenth to air following the programme's revival in 2005 and is the thirty-sixth season overall.

Preceded by a Christmas special in December 2016, "The Return of Doctor Mysterio", the series is the third and final series starring Peter Capaldi as the Twelfth Doctor, an incarnation of the Doctor, an alien Time Lord who travels through time and space in his TARDIS, which appears to be a British police box on the outside; Capaldi announced in January 2017 that he would be stepping down from the role after the tenth series. The series introduces Pearl Mackie as Bill Potts, and also features Matt Lucas as Nardole. Michelle Gomez and John Simm return as their respective incarnations of the Master. The main story arc for the first half of the series revolves around the Doctor and Nardole occupying themselves at a university while they guard an underground vault containing Missy. Missy later travels with the team in the TARDIS, and eventually partners with her previous incarnation as they battle a Cyberman onslaught.

Steven Moffat wrote four episodes for the series. Other returning writers include Frank Cottrell-Boyce, Sarah Dollard, Jamie Mathieson, Peter Harness, Toby Whithouse, and Mark Gatiss, as well as two new writers for the revived era, Mike Bartlett and Rona Munro, the latter of whom wrote the classic-era story Survival (1989). Directors of the series included three who have previously worked on the show and three brand new ones. Filming occurred between June 2016 and April 2017. The series received positive reviews from critics. The performances of Capaldi and Mackie were met with the most praise, as well as the writing, plots, and themes of the episodes.

== Episodes ==
The sixth, seventh, and eighth episodes of the series, "Extremis", "The Pyramid at the End of the World", and "The Lie of the Land", constitute a three-part arc while remaining separate stories. The episodes "World Enough and Time" and "The Doctor Falls" serve as the series' two-part finale and only multi-part story, in the same format as the eighth series.

No. story	No. in series	Title	Directed by	Written by	Original release date	UK viewers (millions)	AI
Special (2016)
264	–	"The Return of Doctor Mysterio"	Ed Bazalgette	Steven Moffat	25 December 2016	7.83	82
The Doctor and Nardole investigate the New York branch of "Harmony Shoal", a multinational research company. Also investigating is journalist Lucy Fletcher, and they discover that Harmony Shoal is transplanting alien brains into humans. One of the alien workers finds the three, but they are rescued by the superhero called the Ghost, an alter ego for Grant Gordon, whom the Doctor met several years before when Grant was a child and accidentally turned him into a superhero. Grant is also a nanny working for Lucy, who is unaware of Grant's true identity. The Doctor and Nardole find the aliens' ship but soon discover that it has been turned into a bomb that will crash into New York as part of a complex plan to implant the alien brains into world leaders, thereby giving them control of the Earth. The Doctor aims the ship towards New York earlier than planned and the collision is stopped by Grant, revealing his identity to Lucy. After he and Lucy announce their love for each other, Grant throws the ship into the sun. UNIT then shuts down Harmony Shoal, but an alien brains implants itself into a UNIT soldier.
Series
265	1	"The Pilot"	Lawrence Gough	Steven Moffat	15 April 2017	6.68	83
The Doctor and Nardole have occupied themselves under the guise of a university professor and assistant. Bill Potts is called to the Doctor's study, where she becomes his student. Bill is intrigued by a student named Heather. Heather asks her to inspect a puddle, asking her if she can see what's wrong with her reflection. The Doctor investigates the puddle and notes that it is not a reflection, but something mimicking them. Bill returns to her flat, where she is chased by a living fluid from an alien ship that has absorbed Heather and her feelings for Bill. Bill runs to the Doctor's study and they flee into the TARDIS. The Doctor moves the TARDIS, where he and Nardole check on a vault they are guarding. The TARDIS lands again in Australia, where the Doctor admits who he is. The fluid follows them to another planet, then through a Dalek battle. Bill convinces "Heather" to let her go, and it departs. The Doctor and Bill return to his study, where he attempts to wipe Bill's memories of the day but she stops him. As Bill leaves, she finds the Doctor waiting with the TARDIS, and joins him.
266	2	"Smile"	Lawrence Gough	Frank Cottrell-Boyce	22 April 2017	5.98	83
The Doctor and Bill arrive on one of Earth's first colonised planets, Gliese 581d. They are greeted only by two different types of robots: swarm robots (Vardies) and slow but sentient emojibots. An emojibot gives the Doctor and Bill discs that communicate their true emotions. The Doctor theorises that the planet is awaiting the colonists but soon realises that the setup crew has been killed by emojibots and their skeletons crushed to feed the plants. Determined to blow up the city, he finds the main ship within it and its engine room, but Bill runs into a child who has awoken from a pod. The colonists were cryogenically frozen, with a few "shepherds" woken early to work. After one shepherd died, the emojibots could not recognise grief and killed all in mourning in an onslaught against sadness. The awakened colonists decide to fight back, but the Doctor wipes the memory of the robots and reboots everything... only humans must now learn to live with the Vardies, the planet's indigenous species. When the TARDIS returns the Doctor and Bill to London, they discover themselves on a frozen Thames River, with an elephant walking towards them on the ice.
267	3	"Thin Ice"	Bill Anderson	Sarah Dollard	29 April 2017	5.61	84
The Doctor and Bill find they have arrived in 1814 London, in the midst of a frost fair on the frozen Thames. The Doctor's sonic screwdriver is stolen by Spider, an orphan pickpocket led by Kitty. The Doctor and Bill chase after Spider and Kitty. Glowing lights under the ice encircle Spider's feet and he is pulled through the ice. The Doctor and Bill don diving suits and purposely let the lights take them; they find a giant sea creature ensnared by chains. They learn from Kitty of Lord Sutcliffe; Sutcliffe affirms his family has used the creature to amass a fortune by collecting and selling its waste as a replacement for coal. Sutcliffe sends the Doctor and Bill to be eaten, while he rigs a bomb to cause the ice to shatter. The Doctor and Bill escape, and the Doctor takes the bomb and places it on the creature's chains. When Sutcliffe sets off the bomb, the creature is freed. They return to the present, where Nardole scolds the Doctor for breaking his oath. While checking the Vault beneath the University, Nardole hears something behind it knock repeatedly.
268	4	"Knock Knock"	Bill Anderson	Mike Bartlett	6 May 2017	5.73	83
Bill and five students sign a lease with a mysterious Landlord to live in his house. After helping Bill move in, the Doctor becomes suspicious of the Landlord. A number of the students mysteriously disappear and the groups are separated. The Doctor along with Harry, one of the students, discover a strange cockroach-like creature which the former nicknames "Dryads". Down in the basement they discover leases from decades ago. The Landlord reveals the whole incident was to keep his daughter, Eliza, alive. Bill and another student, Shireen, come across Eliza who is revealed to be composed of wood. After finding Bill, the Doctor realises that the Landlord is actually Eliza's son. The Landlord attempts to send the Dryads after the Doctor and Bill, but Eliza manages to control them. She embraces the Landlord as the Dryads consume them. The students are restored to their physical bodies as the house collapses. Back at the university, the Doctor enters the vault to feed their prisoner as piano music echoes from inside.
269	5	"Oxygen"	Charles Palmer	Jamie Mathieson	13 May 2017	5.27	83
Nardole accompanies the Doctor and Bill to a space station to answer a distress call. Most of the crew have been killed by their smartsuits, robotic spacesuits capable of independent movement which are the only source of oxygen on the station, forcing the TARDIS crew to don spares. The suits received an order to "deactivate organic components"; some crew survived by being disconnected, but networked suits can transmit the command by touch. Bill's suit malfunctions, forcing the Doctor to give her his helmet to save her, exposing himself to the vacuum of space, which blinds him; he later leaves her behind to be electrocuted, knowing her suit hasn't the power for a lethal shock. The algorithm used by the company determined the crew was inefficient and thus too expensive to keep alive. He wires the survivors' life signs to the station so that if they die it will explode, making it more expensive to kill them, so the suits give over their remaining oxygen. Bill is revived, the Doctor's eyes are repaired, and the survivors return to their head office to complain. Back at the university, the Doctor reveals to Nardole he is still blind.
270	6	"Extremis"	Daniel Nettheim	Steven Moffat	20 May 2017	5.53	82
A long time ago, the Doctor is sent to execute Missy. Nardole interrupts on the behest of River Song. The Doctor refuses to kill Missy, instead imprisoning and guarding her for 1,000 years. In the present, the Pope visits the Doctor, asking him to help translate a text called the Veritas. Everyone who has read it has committed suicide. The Doctor, Nardole and Bill are brought to the Vatican to investigate. While there, Bill and Nardole discover a portal that leads them to the Pentagon. They find the portals being projected lead to different locations all over the world. The Doctor temporarily restores his sight using Time Lord technology, but is ambushed by the Monks, a hostile alien race. Nardole realises the projectors are not projecting portals, but instead the world in which they exist. His realisation causes him to dematerialise. Bill finds the Doctor, who has just listened to a recording of the Veritas, sitting in the Oval Office. He tells her that the world is a simulation and that the text proves this. Bill then disappears due to the Monks' intervention, and the Doctor realises that their simulated world is a test to see if they can conquer the Earth. However, their simulation is too exact, and the Doctor's sonic sunglasses still work. Using them, the virtual Doctor sends a recording of events he has witnessed to the real Doctor, warning him of the coming invasion.
271	7	"The Pyramid at the End of the World"	Daniel Nettheim	Peter Harness and Steven Moffat	27 May 2017	5.79	82
The Doctor is called by the Secretary-General of the U.N. after a pyramid mysteriously appears on the strategic border of the Russian, Chinese, and U.S. armies. It is revealed the Monks are responsible for the pyramid and that they have foreseen a disaster through their simulations, offering an opportunity to save humanity if they consent to their rule. The Secretary-General offers his consent but is killed when he is viewed to be acting out of fear. Elsewhere in a biochemical lab, a scientist accidentally misreads the levels of chemicals in an experiment releasing deadly biochemical bacteria. The Doctor surmises that the disaster was unrelated to war, but may be biochemical. After the Doctor and Nardole locate the lab, Nardole collapses following exposure to the bacteria whilst waiting in the TARDIS. The Doctor with the assistance of Erica, a lab worker, surmises the only way to stop it would be to destroy the lab. He becomes stuck on the side of a manual lock however, due to his blindness. Bill makes a deal with the Monks to restore the Doctor's sight despite his protests. He manages to escape but at the expense of handing the planet over to the Monks.
272	8	"The Lie of the Land"	Wayne Yip	Toby Whithouse	3 June 2017	4.82	82
The Monks now rule the planet, and to most of humanity, they appear to have been on Earth for millions of years, guiding human development. Bill and a few others know the truth. Nardole locates Bill, and they search for the Doctor. They locate him, but he is cooperating with the Monks. Bill shoots him and it appears he is regenerating, but it is all a trick to see whether Bill has been fooled by the Monks. At the university, the Doctor speaks to Missy, who reveals Bill has to die to break the Monk's influence on Earth. The Doctor hopes there is another solution and infiltrates the Monk's pyramid in London. The Doctor attempts to break the link but fails. Bill prepares to sacrifice herself, however, the Monk's images are replaced with those of Bill's mother, which represents hope. Due to their actions, the Monks leave and humanity recalls none of the events. Back in the Vault, Missy expresses remorse at those she has murdered.
273	9	"Empress of Mars"	Wayne Yip	Mark Gatiss	10 June 2017	5.02	83
NASA finds the words "God save the Queen" buried under the ice cap of Mars. The Doctor, Bill, and Nardole venture to Mars in 1881 and discover soldiers from Victorian Britain. Nardole goes back into the TARDIS, but it returns to the university, and he asks Missy for help getting back. The humans have befriended an Ice Warrior named Friday. Captain Catchlove says they rescued Friday from his crashed spaceship, and Friday allowed the soldiers to use his technology to mine Mars. They unearth the tomb of the Ice Empress Iraxxa; one guard revives her. Friday tells Iraxxa that the Martian surface is uninhabitable. She decides to relent, but a soldier fires his rifle; provoked, she returns fire. Iraxxa starts reviving Ice Warriors. The Doctor threatens to use the mining device to bury them all. Catchlove holds Iraxxa at knifepoint and attempts to force her to help him pilot a spaceship. Godsacre kills Catchlove. Iraxxa calls off the attack in exchange for Godsacre pledging himself to her. The Doctor contacts Alpha Centauri to assist the Ice Warriors, and also leaves the message for NASA. Nardole re-appears with the TARDIS and Missy, who expresses concern about the Doctor.
274	10	"The Eaters of Light"	Charles Palmer	Rona Munro	17 June 2017	4.73	81
The Doctor and Bill, disagreeing about the fate of the Ninth Legion of the Imperial Roman army, travel to 2nd-century Scotland. Bill goes her own way, while the Doctor and Nardole look for their bodies. Bill encounters the Legion's soldiers hiding from a creature drawn to any light source, killing those in its path. Meanwhile, the Doctor and Nardole discover the corpses of the remaining Legion. They later come across a Pict tribe guarding a cairn. The Doctor enters the cairn, passing into an interdimensional portal. The Pict explains that a warrior goes through the cairn to defeat an "Eater of Light", but with the invading Roman army, she allowed one to escape to fight them. Bill leads the surviving legion away from the creature and reunites with the Doctor and Nardole. The Doctor plans to lure the Eater back to the portal during daylight, but requires someone inside preventing the creature's escape. Once the creature is trapped, The Pict and the Ninth Legion sacrifice themselves to stop the creatures. Back in the TARDIS, Missy awaits their return, to the surprise of Bill and Nardole. The Doctor tells Missy that he has hope she will turn good.
275a	11	"World Enough and Time"	Rachel Talalay	Steven Moffat	24 June 2017	5.00	85
The Doctor stumbles from the TARDIS into a snowy landscape and begins regenerating. Earlier, the Doctor proposed to test Missy by having her answer a distress call. They arrive via TARDIS on a colony ship reversing away from a black hole. They are held at gunpoint by Jorj, who demands to know which of them is human then shoots Bill. The Doctor, Missy, and Nardole learn that a few days ago, some of the crew had gone down to the ship's lower decks but never returned. Jorj claims the ship is empty, but there are thousands of humans, descendants of the crew: due to time dilation, time moves faster on the furthest decks. Bill awakens in a hospital with a replacement heart. Razor, the caretaker, explains that some of the patients are waiting to be "upgraded". Years later, they see footage of the Doctor coming down the lift, while only a few minutes have passed for the Doctor. The Doctor, Nardole, and Missy discover the origin of the ship: Mondas. Razor approaches Missy and reveals himself to be her previous incarnation of the Master. The Doctor and Nardole find a Cyberman who reveals itself as Bill.
275b	12	"The Doctor Falls"	Rachel Talalay	Steven Moffat	1 July 2017	5.29	83
Escaping to a higher floor, the Doctor tries to comfort Bill, who has just retained her humanity. This floor is a simulated countryside, where the group helps defend the villagers from the oncoming Cybermen. The Doctor attempts to convince Missy and the Master to help him. They refuse, though Missy seems conflicted. Hoping to save the villagers, the Doctor tells Nardole to take them to another floor. Bill opts to stay with the Doctor, and Nardole says goodbye, taking the villagers to safety. Elsewhere, Missy betrays the Master by stabbing him in the back, triggering the regeneration process. He shoots her in return, killing her and preventing her regeneration. The Doctor fights off the Cybermen but is wounded in the process. He proceeds to blow up the whole floor, killing himself. Bill survives, with Heather appearing before her. Heather reveals she has changed Bill into her species so she could live on. The two take the Doctor's body back to his TARDIS before they leave to see the universe together. The Doctor awakens as the regeneration process begins. He attempts to stop it and exits the TARDIS into a snowy landscape, where he is greeted by the First Doctor.
Special (2017)
276	–	"Twice Upon a Time"	Rachel Talalay	Steven Moffat	25 December 2017	7.92	81
Returning to his TARDIS at the South Pole, the First Doctor refuses to regenerate. He encounters the Twelfth Doctor outside his own TARDIS in a similar state of mind. The pair are approached by a displaced First World War British captain. All three are abducted by a spaceship, where they meet Bill Potts. They are offered freedom by the ship's glass-like holographic pilot in exchange for the return of the Captain. They escape and take the First Doctor's TARDIS to Villengard. The Twelfth Doctor meets with the Dalek Rusty. Given access to the Dalek Hivemind, the Doctor learns that the pilot is designed to extract people when they died, such as Bill, and archive their memories. The Doctors agree to return the Captain to his timeline, which happens to be minutes before the Christmas truce. The First Doctor, prepared to regenerate, returns to his TARDIS. After being alone with Bill's avatar, the Doctor returns to the TARDIS and regenerates after relaying advice to his next incarnation. After the Thirteenth Doctor examines her reflection, the TARDIS suffers multiple failures. As the console room explodes and the TARDIS dematerialises, the Doctor is thrown out and plummets towards the Earth.

=== Supplemental episode ===
Title	Directed by	Written by	Original release date	Length
"Friend from the Future"	Lawrence Gough	Steven Moffat	23 April 2016	2:05
From a hidden corner of a corridor inside a spaceship, the Doctor attempts to answer Bill's questions about their enemies, the Daleks. Bill finds them amusing at first, but the Doctor persists and she realises they are in real danger. An edited version of this scene was later included in "The Pilot".

== Casting ==
Peter Capaldi reprised his role as the Twelfth Doctor in his third and final series; he left after the 2017 Christmas special, while Pearl Mackie portrayed the newest companion Bill Potts, after the departure of Jenna Coleman. To avoid leaks while casting the new companion, the production team used the word "Mean Town", an anagram of "Ten Woman"; this is a reference to the fact that Bill is the companion of the tenth series, and was revealed by casting director Andy Pryor to Radio Times. Mackie made her first appearance in the first episode of the tenth series, and was the first openly gay companion. Matt Lucas returned in his role as Nardole, as seen in the 2015 and 2016 Christmas specials "The Husbands of River Song" and "The Return of Doctor Mysterio", in a regular role. Lucas was initially contracted to appear occasionally, but was ultimately written into every episode due to the production team's positive response to the character.

In June 2016, it was announced that Stephanie Hyam would be joining the tenth series. In July 2016, actors Mina Anwar, Ralf Little, and Kaizer Akhtar had been added to the cast and portrayed Goodthing, Steadfast, and Praiseworthy respectively in the second episode. On 16 August 2016, it was announced that David Suchet, famous for his role in Agatha Christie's Poirot, would appear as a character known as "The Landlord" in the fourth episode, "Knock Knock". Tate Pitchie-Cooper portrayed a child version of The Landlord. Fady Elsayed, who starred in the Doctor Who spin-off Class, was originally set to guest star in an episode of Doctor Who.

In October 2016, it was announced that Justin Chatwin was set to appear as a superhero in the 2016 Christmas special "The Return of Doctor Mysterio". He was joined by Charity Wakefield, Adetomiwa Edun, Aleksandar Jovanovic, and Logan Hoffman. On 16 November 2016 the BBC announced the cast for the fifth episode, which included Kieran Bew, Peter Caulfield, Mimi Ndiweni and Katie Brayben, with Justin Salinger portraying "Tasker", while Rebecca Benson, Daniel Kerr, Juwon Adedokun, Brian Vernel, Ben Hunter, Aaron Phagura, Sam Adewunmi and Billy Matthews were announced to be appearing in the tenth episode. Jennifer Hennessy, Nicholas Burns, Mandeep Dhillon, Mariah Gale, Corrado Invernizzi, Tim Bentinck, Joseph Long, Ronkẹ Adékoluẹjo, Togo Igawa, Emma Handy, and Ferdinand Kingsley also made appearances.

On 14 October 2016, Michelle Gomez announced that she would reprise her role of Missy in the series, and in May 2017, she further stated that it would be her last series in the role. On 30 January 2017, Capaldi confirmed that the tenth series would be his last. On 6 April 2017, the BBC announced that John Simm would be returning in his role as the Master alongside Gomez. David Bradley made a cameo appearance as the First Doctor at the end of the series finale, "The Doctor Falls", which led into the 2017 Christmas special, "Twice Upon a Time".

== Production ==
=== Development ===
In July 2015, the annual review for BBC Worldwide indicated that it had invested in a tenth series of the programme. It was announced in January 2016 that Series 10 would be Steven Moffat's final series as showrunner, after which he would be replaced in the role by Chris Chibnall in 2018. Composer Murray Gold announced in February 2018 that he would step down as the programme's composer, having served as the musical director since 2005, and that he would not be composing the music for the eleventh series, which would be instead composed by Segun Akinola.

=== Writing ===
In May 2016, Steven Moffat stated in the 500th issue of Doctor Who Magazine that he would be writing the first and last three episodes of the series. Furthermore, he stated that the series would consist mostly of single-part stories so that the new companion, Bill Potts, could have more stories to explore her character, though two-parters would still be present in the series. Moffat also wrote the 2017 Christmas special, after the tenth series had concluded.

Lawrence Gough directed the first two episodes of the tenth series, while Frank Cottrell-Boyce wrote the series' second episode, having previously written "In the Forest of the Night" for the eighth series. Sarah Dollard, who wrote "Face the Raven" for the ninth series also returned for an episode, as did playwright Mike Bartlett for an episode in the same production block as Dollard's. Matt Lucas revealed that Jamie Mathieson was set to write the fifth episode for the series, having previously written "Mummy on the Orient Express" and "Flatline" and having co-written "The Girl Who Died". Daniel Nettheim directed two episodes for the series, written by Steven Moffat and Peter Harness, after having previously directed the two-parter "The Zygon Invasion" / "The Zygon Inversion" in the ninth series.

In June 2016, Mark Gatiss stated he would be writing an episode for the series; later identified as the ninth episode, a change to Moffat's previous announcement that he would be writing for that particular episode. In 2015, Gatiss had indicated that he might write a sequel for the ninth series episode "Sleep No More"; however, this was not the basis for Gatiss' episode for the tenth series. Instead, the episode featured the return of the Ice Warriors, a race known for their appearances in the eras of the Second Doctor and Third Doctor, and in the 2013 episode "Cold War", also written by Gatiss.

Moffat announced in October 2016 that a writer who had previously written for the classic series would be returning to write an episode, later confirmed as Rona Munro, who previously wrote Survival, the final serial of both Season 26 and the classic series. Munro is the writer for the tenth episode of the series, titled "The Eaters of Light". Toby Whithouse wrote the eighth episode.

On 6 March 2017, it was announced the original Mondasian Cybermen from The Tenth Planet would be returning for the finale of the tenth series.

=== Music ===
Murray Gold composed the soundtrack to this series, the last time he did so until his return to the show in 2023. The orchestrations were provided by Ben Foster. In a 2023 interview with Doctor Who Magazine, he addressed the lack of an official soundtrack release, noting: "I don't know what happened. Well, all those world events happened. But it is out there, somewhere. (...) Look, it will come out. That's an exclusive. The Series 10 album will see the light of day. By hook or by crook." The soundtrack was released on 12 December 2025, eight years after the series was broadcast.

=== Filming ===
The read-through for the first production block of the tenth series took place on 14 June 2016. Filming began on 20 June 2016. The second episode was filmed in Valencia, Spain. Shooting for the first block concluded on 28 July 2016. The read-through for the second block took place on 18 July 2016, and filming began on 1 August 2016, beginning with the third episode. Production on the 2016 Christmas special began on 5 September 2016 and wrapped on 30 September 2016. The read-through for "Oxygen" took place on 12 October 2016. Shooting on the fourth block began on 17 October and ended on 18 November 2016. Filming for the fifth block began on 23 November 2016, paused in December for a break over the holidays, resumed on 3 January 2017, and concluded on 17 January 2017. The sixth block began filming concurrently on 16 January 2017, before concluding on 22 February 2017. On 6 March 2017, the BBC stated that the work on the final two episodes of the series had begun, with Rachel Talalay returning to direct her third consecutive series finale.

Filming for the series was concluded on 7 April 2017. Production for the 2017 Christmas special started on 12 June 2017 and concluded on 10 July 2017.

Filming for the spin-off series Class ran from April to September 2016, beginning before the filming for the tenth series of Doctor Who started. Peter Capaldi took part in the filming of Class and appeared in the opening episode of the spin-off series.

Production blocks were arranged as follows:

Block	Episode(s)	Director	Writer(s)	Producer
1	Episode 1: "The Pilot"	Lawrence Gough	Steven Moffat	Peter Bennett
1	Episode 2: "Smile"	Lawrence Gough	Frank Cottrell-Boyce	Peter Bennett
2	Episode 3: "Thin Ice"	Bill Anderson	Sarah Dollard	Nikki Wilson
2	Episode 4: "Knock Knock"	Bill Anderson	Mike Bartlett	Nikki Wilson
3	Christmas special: "The Return of Doctor Mysterio"	Ed Bazalgette	Steven Moffat	Peter Bennett
4	Episode 5: "Oxygen"	Charles Palmer	Jamie Mathieson	Nikki Wilson
4	Episode 10: "The Eaters of Light"	Charles Palmer	Rona Munro	Nikki Wilson
5	Episode 6: "Extremis"	Daniel Nettheim	Steven Moffat	Peter Bennett
5	Episode 7: "The Pyramid at the End of the World"	Daniel Nettheim	Peter Harness and Steven Moffat	Peter Bennett
6	Episode 8: "The Lie of the Land"	Wayne Yip	Toby Whithouse	Nikki Wilson
6	Episode 9: "Empress of Mars"	Wayne Yip	Mark Gatiss	Nikki Wilson
7	Episode 11: "World Enough and Time"	Rachel Talalay	Steven Moffat	Peter Bennett
7	Episode 12: "The Doctor Falls"	Rachel Talalay	Steven Moffat	Peter Bennett
X	Christmas special: "Twice Upon a Time"	Rachel Talalay	Steven Moffat	Peter Bennett

== Release ==
=== Promotion ===
A preview scene was filmed in April 2016 as part of a promotional clip shown on 23 April 2016 on BBC One, during the semi-final half-time of the 2015–16 FA Cup. It introduced the Doctor and his new companion, Bill, being faced with Daleks. However, Moffat has stated that this scene might not be introduced into the series itself. Capaldi, Mackie, Lucas, and Moffat promoted the series at New York Comic Con in October 2016.

The first trailer for the series premiered at the end of the 2016 Christmas special, "The Return of Doctor Mysterio". A second teaser trailer was released on 25 February 2017. On 13 March 2017, the BBC released a new promotional image of Capaldi, Mackie, and Lucas, as well as releasing the title for the premiere. The full trailer for the series was premiered later the same day on BBC One, during the quarter-final half-time of the 2016–17 FA Cup, along with promotional images from the first episode.

Leading up to the launch of the series, five teaser trailers aired online. On 31 March 2017 BBC America released the trailer for Doctor Who and Class. The same day, an interview with Mackie was shown on BBC News, containing clips from the first episode. Another trailer for the series premiered on 3 April 2017. On 9 April 2017 Capaldi, Mackie, Moffat, and Minchin attended a panel at the BFI & Radio Times TV Festival, featuring a sneak preview of clips from the upcoming series.

=== Broadcast ===
In November 2015, Steven Moffat denied widespread rumours that the series was going to consist of fewer episodes, confirming that the tenth series would have a full twelve-episode order, plus the Christmas special. By Christmas 2016, the series was confirmed to have a release date set in early 2017. The tenth series premiered on 15 April 2017 in the United Kingdom, the United States, and Canada, on 16 April in Australia, and on 17 April in New Zealand. In Australia, the tenth series was accompanied by the Whovians panel show on ABC, hosted by Rove McManus.

"The Pilot" had a cinema screening in the U.S. on 17 and 19 April 2017, two and four days respectively after the episode's initial broadcast. The screening of "The Pilot" was followed by a screening of "For Tonight We Might Die", the premiere episode of the spin-off series Class, and behind-the-scenes footage of Pearl Mackie and her journey through the series. The episode was screened in Australian cinemas on 16 April 2017. The screening included a bonus feature, "Becoming The Companion".

=== Aftershow ===
Doctor Who: The Fan Show was produced as a follow-up series to Doctor Who Extra, which was the latest after show series for Doctor Who, until the show was axed. The Fan Show series was announced in May 2015, and was presented by Doctor Who fans who have their own YouTube channel of the same name, in which they post weekly videos based on Doctor Who. Doctor Who: The Fan Show was released on the official Doctor Who YouTube channel straight after the week's episode is broadcast on the main channel, BBC One.

=== Home media ===
- ^{(D)} indicates a DVD release for a specific date
- ^{(B)} indicates a Blu-ray release
- ^{(D,B)} indicates a simultaneous DVD and Blu-ray release
- ^{(UHD)} indicates an Ultra HD Blu-ray release (includes Blu-ray)

Series	Story no.	Episode name	Duration	Release date		
Series	Story no.	Episode name	Duration	R2	R4	R1
10	264	Doctor Who: "The Return of Doctor Mysterio"	1 × 60 min.	23 January 2017^{(D,B)}	22 February 2017^{(D,B)}	21 February 2017^{(D,B)}
10	265–270	Doctor Who: Series 10, Part 1 "The Pilot" – "Extremis"	2 × 50 min. 4 × 45 min.	29 May 2017^{(D,B)}	31 May 2017^{(D,B)}	6 June 2017^{(D,B)}
10	271–275	Doctor Who: Series 10, Part 2 "The Pyramid at the End of the World" – "The Doctor Falls"	1 × 60 min. 5 × 45 min.	24 July 2017^{(D,B)}	16 August 2017^{(D,B)}	12 September 2017^{(D,B)}
10	264–275	Doctor Who: The Complete Tenth Series (includes "The Return of Doctor Mysterio")	2 × 60 min. 2 × 50 min. 9 × 45 min.	13 November 2017^{(D,B)}	29 November 2017^{(D,B)}	7 November 2017^{(D,B)}
10	276	Doctor Who: "Twice Upon a Time"	1 × 60 min.	22 January 2018^{(D,B)} 24 September 2018^{(UHD)}	7 February 2018^{(D,B)} 17 October 2018^{(UHD)}	13 February 2018^{(D,B)} 25 September 2018^{(UHD)}
8, 9, 10	242–276	Doctor Who: The Complete Peter Capaldi Years	26 × 45 min. 5 × 50 min. 1 × 55 min. 7 × 60 min. 1 × 76 min.	—N/a	—N/a	13 February 2018^{(B)} 2 October 2018^{(D)}

== In print ==
Series	Story no.	Novelisation title	Author	Original publisher	Paperback release date	Audiobook	
Series	Story no.	Novelisation title	Author	Original publisher	Paperback release date	Release date (Note: Unabridged from BBC Audio / AudioGo unless otherwise indicated)	Narrator
10	274	The Eaters of Light	Rona Munro	BBC Books (Target collection)	14 July 2022		Rebecca Benson
10	276	Twice Upon a Time	Paul Cornell	BBC Books (Target collection)	5 April 2018	7 June 2018	Mark Gatiss

== Reception ==
=== Ratings ===
No.	Title	Air date	Overnight ratings		Consolidated ratings		Total viewers (millions)	28-day viewers (millions)	AI	Ref(s)
No.	Title	Air date	Viewers (millions)	Rank	Viewers (millions)	Rank	Total viewers (millions)	28-day viewers (millions)	AI	Ref(s)
–	"The Return of Doctor Mysterio"	25 December 2016	5.68	6	2.15	9	7.83	8.22	82	
1	"The Pilot"	15 April 2017	4.64	2	2.04	10	6.68	7.24	83	
2	"Smile"	22 April 2017	4.25	4	1.73	23	5.98	6.45	83	
3	"Thin Ice"	29 April 2017	3.76	4	1.85	25	5.61	5.87	84	
4	"Knock Knock"	6 May 2017	4.32	1	1.41	21	5.73	6.20	83	
5	"Oxygen"	13 May 2017	3.57	4	1.7	26	5.27	5.85	83	
6	"Extremis"	20 May 2017	4.16	3	1.37	20	5.53	5.97	82	
7	"The Pyramid at the End of the World"	27 May 2017	4.01	2	1.78	14	5.79	6.16	82	
8	"The Lie of the Land"	3 June 2017	3.01	4	1.81	30	4.82	5.29	82	
9	"Empress of Mars"	10 June 2017	3.58	6	1.44	23	5.02	5.54	83	
10	"The Eaters of Light"	17 June 2017	2.89	4	1.84	26	4.73	5.12	81	
11	"World Enough and Time"	24 June 2017	3.37	3	1.63	21	5.00	5.30	85	
12	"The Doctor Falls"	1 July 2017	3.75	3	1.55	16	5.30	5.60	83	
–	"Twice Upon a Time"	25 December 2017	5.66	5	2.26	9	7.92	8.28	81	

=== Critical reception ===
Doctor Who's tenth series has received positive reviews. Series 10 holds an 88% approval rating on online review aggregate site Rotten Tomatoes with an average score of 7.54/10. The website's critical consensus reads, "Peter Capaldi's darkest wit shines in his final season as Doctor Who thanks to the newest foil and friend, Bill Potts." Writing for the Radio Times halfway through the series' run, Huw Fullerton called it "a return to form for the sci-fi series after a much-needed rest year, with the format, actors and writers all feeling fresher than during their last outing". Reaction to individual episodes was also positive, with scores on the site ranging from 83% to 100%; four episodes of the series hold a perfect approval rating, which include the final three of the series. Specifically, episodes such as "Oxygen" and "Extremis" received positive reception, with critics saying that the former was a "great, thought-provoking episode", whilst the latter was labelled as a unique and ambitious episode, and that "Doctor Who doesn't get better than this".

The series also introduced Pearl Mackie as Bill Potts, the Doctor's newest companion; Mackie has received consistently favorable comments, noting how she was "bringing an energy distinct from any previous new series companion", describing Bill as "a wonderful change of pace", and how her acting was "consistently honest, raw at times, and never, ever whimsy", with certain scenes being "guttural" and "heart-wrenching". Controversial topics, such as racism and capitalism, were covered during episodes in the series, and were also met with positive reactions.

=== Awards and nominations ===
Year	Award	Category	Nominee(s)	Result	Ref(s)
2017	BBC Radio 1 Teen Awards	Best TV Show	Doctor Who	Nominated	
2017	Diversity in Media Awards	TV Moment of the Year	Doctor Who	Nominated	
2017	Hugo Awards	Best Dramatic Presentation, Short Form	Steven Moffat and Ed Bazalgette for "The Return of Doctor Mysterio"	Nominated	
2017	PinkNews Awards	Ally Award for LGBT inclusiveness	Doctor Who	Won	
2017	Saturn Awards	Best Television Presentation	"The Return of Doctor Mysterio"	Nominated	
2017	TV Times Awards	Favourite Newcomer	Pearl Mackie	Nominated	
2018	Hugo Awards	Best Dramatic Presentation, Short Form	Steven Moffat and Rachel Talalay for "Twice Upon a Time"	Nominated	
2018	People's Choice Awards	The Sci-Fi/Fantasy Show of 2018	Doctor Who	Nominated	
2018	Saturn Awards	Best Science Fiction Television Series	Doctor Who	Nominated	
2018	Saturn Awards	Best Television Presentation	"Twice Upon a Time"	Nominated	
2018	Sunday Herald Culture Awards	Best Actor – Television	Peter Capaldi for "Twice Upon a Time"	Won	
2019	BAFTA Cymru	Best Special and Visual Effects	Doctor Who Production Team for "The Doctor Falls"	Nominated	

== Soundtrack ==
Doctor Who: Series 10

Soundtrack album by Murray Gold
- Released: 12 December 2025
- Genre: Soundtrack
- Length: 127:41
- Label: Silva Screen

Doctor Who soundtrack chronology
Doctor Who: The Daleks in Colour (2024)	Doctor Who: Series 10 (2025)	Doctor Who: Timelash (2026)

In April 2020, composer Murray Gold announced that the soundtrack for the tenth series was being processed, after a long delay of three years after the series had premiered. Gold reiterated the soundtrack's eventual release in April 2023, and again in June 2025, where he commented that there would likely be "one big music dump" for the soundtracks of the tenth series, 2023 specials, fourteenth series and fifteenth series.

The soundtrack was released on 12 December 2025, eight years after the series was broadcast.

All tracks are written by Murray Gold.

Disc 1
No.	Title	Episode	Length
1.	"A Doctor for Christmas"	"The Return of Doctor Mysterio"	1:19
2.	"You're a Superhero"	"The Return of Doctor Mysterio"	1:06
3.	"Harmony Shoal"	"The Return of Doctor Mysterio"	1:58
4.	"The Flight of The Ghost"	"The Return of Doctor Mysterio"	2:14
5.	"Next Stop, New York"	"The Return of Doctor Mysterio"	1:30
6.	"Brace for Impact"	"The Return of Doctor Mysterio"	1:30
7.	"Saving the Day"	"The Return of Doctor Mysterio"	2:24
8.	"The Professor"	Series 10	1:25
9.	"Trapped in the TARDIS"	″	3:10
10.	"Escape from Earth"	″	1:14
11.	"The Deadliest Fire in the Universe"	″	1:00
12.	"Keep Your Memories"	″	1:25
13.	"The Vardies"	″	1:06
14.	"No Humans"	″	1:16
15.	"The Calorimeter"	″	2:24
16.	"Frost Fair"	″	2:10
17.	"Moving On"	″	2:02
18.	"Feeding Time"	″	1:15
19.	"Bill"	″	1:05
20.	"Out of the Woodwork"	″	1:20
21.	"The Tower"	″	4:10
22.	"Zombies in Space"	″	1:42
23.	"Fighting the Suits"	″	1:35
24.	"The Executioner"	″	3:11
25.	"Divine Intervention"	″	1:50
26.	"Finding the Veritas"	″	1:42
27.	"Oath of a Time Lord"	″	0:46
28.	"Calling the Doctor"	″	1:16
29.	"Times of Crisis"	″	2:20
30.	"Arrival at the Pyramid"	″	1:31
31.	"Judgement of the Monks"	″	1:33
32.	"The World That Never Was"	″	1:32
33.	"Memory Crimes"	″	1:30
34.	"Holding on to Hope"	″	2:02
35.	"Rescue Mission"	″	1:28
36.	"Whatever it Takes"	″	3:27
37.	"The Band Back Together"	″	1:43
38.	"It Has to Be Bill"	″	2:04
39.	"Glimpse of Freedom"	″	3:36
40.	"Missy's Remorse"	″	0:56
Total length:			72:47

Disc 2
No.	Title	Episode	Length
1.	"The Countdown"	Series 10	0:55
2.	"The Story in the Stone"	″	1:40
3.	"Lost Legion of the Ninth"	″	1:55
4.	"The Colony Ship"	″	1:10
5.	"This Was a Bad Idea"	″	2:24
6.	"Oldest Friend in the Universe"	″	2:23
7.	"A Matter of Time"	″	2:07
8.	"Operation"	″	1:17
9.	"Genesis of the Cybermen"	″	2:09
10.	"Scarecrow Cybermen"	″	1:35
11.	"Parallel Evolution"	″	2:52
12.	"The Solar Farm"	″	1:40
13.	"Time Enough"	″	1:49
14.	"The Doctor Lies Still"	″	4:38
15.	"I Will Not Change"	″	3:26
16.	"The Original, You Might Say"	"Twice Upon a Time"	2:42
17.	"Chamber of the Dead"	"Twice Upon a Time"	3:10
18.	"A Doctor of War"	"Twice Upon a Time"	2:07
19.	"Daleks on Villengard"	"Twice Upon a Time"	2:46
20.	"The Long Way Round"	"Twice Upon a Time"	6:42
21.	"Doctor, I Let You Go"	"Twice Upon a Time"	5:27
Total length:			54:54
