= Stephanie Hyam =

British actress and artist

Stephanie Hyam is a British actress and artist, notable for stage work including The James Plays (2014, Edinburgh International Festival and Royal National Theatre) and film and TV appearances including Their Finest (2017), Doctor Who (2017: "The Pilot" and "The Doctor Falls"), Peaky Blinders (2016), Sherlock (2016: "The Abominable Bride"), Jekyll and Hyde (2015), and Bodyguard (2018). She is a graduate of Mountview Academy of Theatre Arts.

== Filmography ==
=== Films ===
Year	Title	Role
2016	Their Finest	Angela Ralli-Thomas
2018	Stan & Ollie	Mr Miffin's Receptionist

=== Television ===
Year	Title	Role	Notes
2014	Murdered by My Boyfriend	Lauren	TV movie
2015	Jekyll & Hyde	Lily Clarke	Miniseries, main cast
2016	Peaky Blinders	Charlotte Murray	3 episodes
2016	Sherlock	Jane	1 episode
2017	Doctor Who	Heather	2 episodes
2018	Bodyguard	Chanel	3 episodes
2019	A Confession	Becky Godden-Edwards	Miniseries, 4 episodes
2019	Gentleman Jack	Miss Sophie Ferrall	1 episode
2022	Four Lives	Jenny Taylor	Miniseries, 2 episodes
2024	Douglas Is Cancelled	Helen	4 episodes
