= World Enough and Time (Doctor Who) =

275a – "World Enough and Time"
- Doctor Who episode

Cast
- Doctor: Peter Capaldi – Twelfth Doctor
- Companions: Pearl Mackie – Bill Potts; Matt Lucas – Nardole; Michelle Gomez – Missy
- Others: John Simm – The Master; Oliver Lansley – Jorj; Paul Brightwell – Surgeon; Alison Lintott – Nurse; Nicholas Briggs – Voice of the Cybermen

Production
- Directed by: Rachel Talalay
- Written by: Steven Moffat
- Produced by: Peter Bennett
- Executive producers: Steven Moffat; Brian Minchin
- Music by: Murray Gold
- Series: Series 10
- Running time: 1st of 2-part story, 46 minutes
- First broadcast: 24 June 2017

Chronology
← Preceded by "The Eaters of Light"	Followed by → "The Doctor Falls"

"World Enough and Time" is the eleventh and penultimate episode of the tenth series of the British science fiction television series Doctor Who. It was written by Steven Moffat, directed by Rachel Talalay, and was broadcast on 24 June 2017 on BBC One. The episode was the first part of a two-part story, concluding with "The Doctor Falls".

In the episode, the Doctor, Bill, Nardole, and Missy answer a distress call from a gigantic ship trying to escape a black hole. "World Enough and Time" is the first multi-Master episode in the show's televised history, as it features both Missy and an earlier incarnation last seen in the 2009–2010 serial "The End of Time". It also features the return of the original Mondasian Cybermen, first seen on-screen in the 1966 serial The Tenth Planet, which was the Cybermen's debut.

The episode was watched by 5.00 million viewers and received much critical praise, with many claiming it as the best of the tenth series. Aspects that were met with praise were the performances and the characterisation of Missy. However, many criticised the BBC for revealing the cliffhanger early on.

== Plot ==
The Doctor proposed to test Missy's atonement by having her, alongside Bill and Nardole, answer a distress call. They arrive via the TARDIS on a giant colony ship reversing away from a black hole. They are held at gunpoint by the solitary crew member, Jorj, who demands to know which of them is human, fearing creatures that are arriving by the lift. Bill admits to being human and Jorj shoots her out of fear. Humanoid figures, wearing cloth masks and hospital gowns, take Bill's body away claiming they can restore her.

The Doctor, Missy, and Nardole learn from Jorj that, two days previously, some of the human bridge crew had gone down to the lower level of the ship to start the engine reversal, but they never returned. Jorj claims the ship only had 50 people two days ago, but Nardole shows there are actually thousands of life forms below. They are the descendants of the crew: due to time dilation from the black hole, time moves faster at the ship's lower levels than the bridge 400 miles away, and years have already passed for Bill. The Doctor incapacitates Jorj and, along with Missy and Nardole, departs below in a lift.

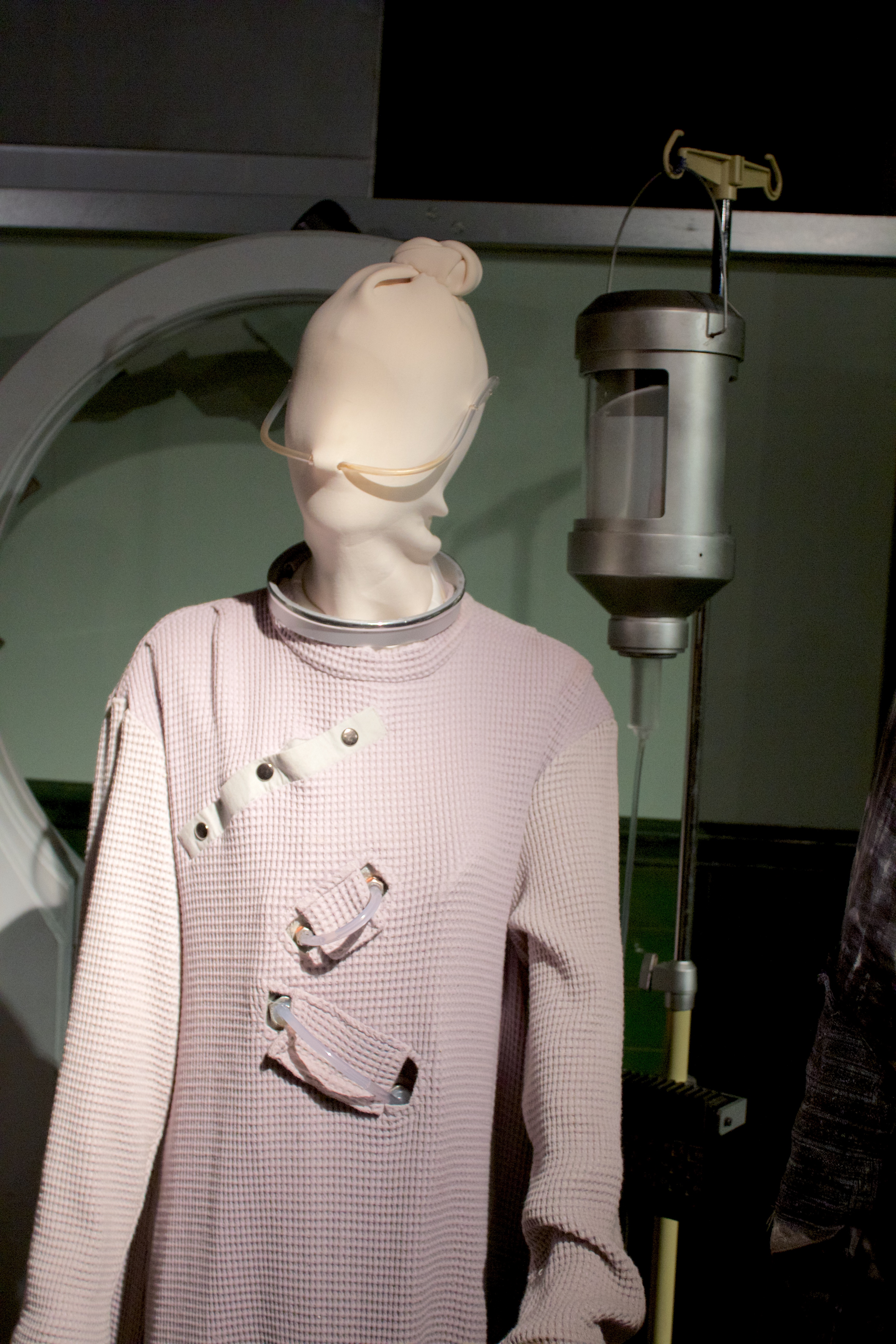
Another of the patients waiting to be "upgraded", on display at a Doctor Who exhibition.

Bill awakens in a hospital, where she finds that she has been fitted with a mechanical device that serves as her replacement heart. Razor, one of the hospital's employees, shows her around and explains that some of the patients are waiting to be "upgraded" for "Operation Exodus", to escape the polluted air of the ship's lower levels due to contamination from the fuel. Years later, they see footage from the bridge of the Doctor coming down the lift. However, Razor then tricks Bill into becoming the next "upgrade" subject.

Upon arriving, the Doctor and Nardole explore the hospital while Missy tries to determine the origin of the colony ship. She finds the vessel is from a "twin" of Earth, Mondas. Razor approaches her and insists she has been here before, and that the Doctor will never forgive her for what has happened to Bill. When she denies it, Razor removes his disguise revealing himself to be the Saxon Master, Missy's earlier incarnation. The Doctor and Nardole find an operating theatre where a "Mondasian" Cyberman, from when the Doctor first encountered them, emerges from a closet. The Cyberman identifies itself as formerly being Bill Potts.

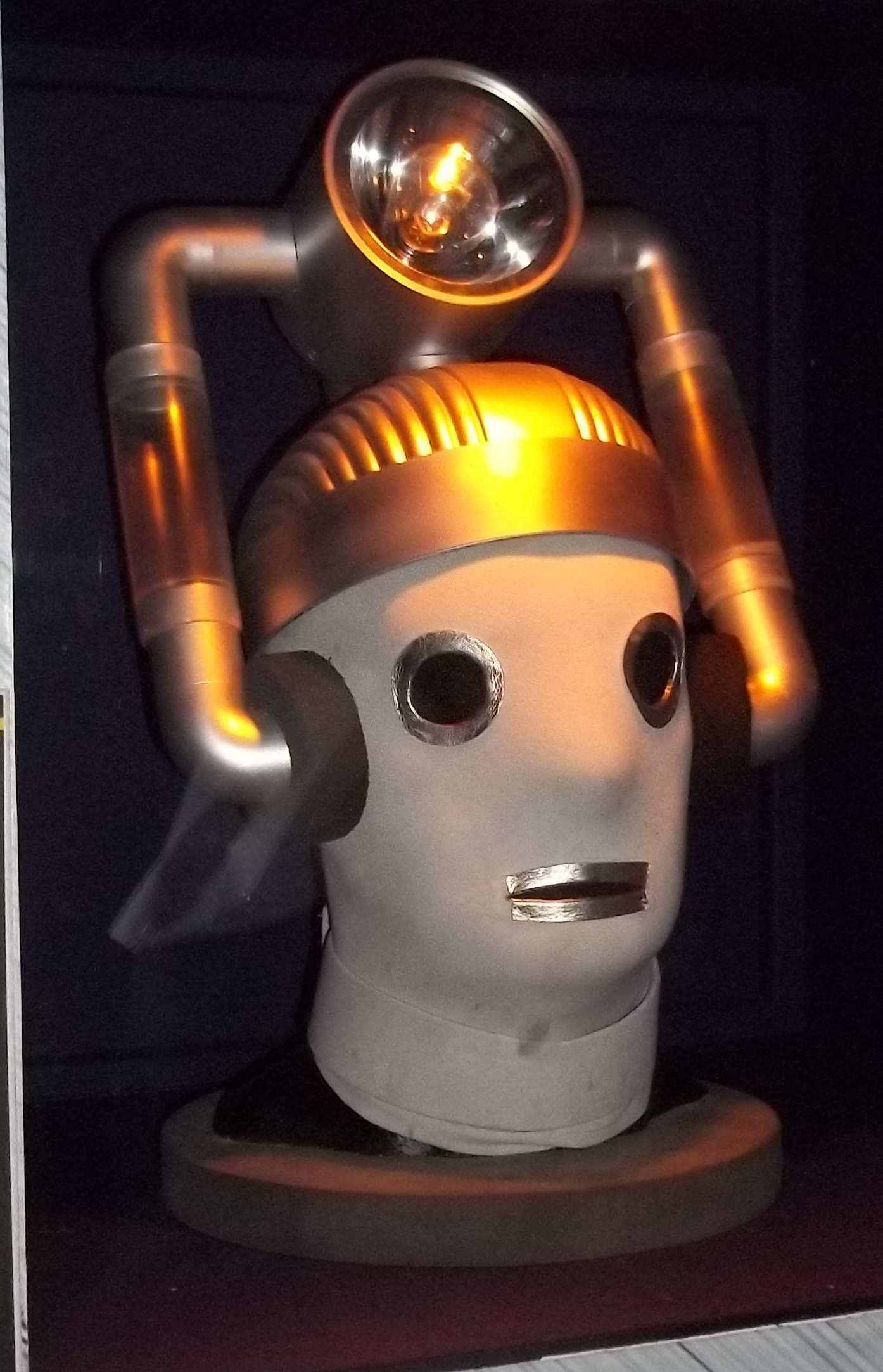
This episode featured the return of the original Mondasian Cybermen, not seen since 1966 in The Tenth Planet. They are shown here at a Doctor Who exhibition.

=== Continuity ===
The Master says that he loves disguises, a fondness which dates back to his debut appearance in Terror of the Autons when he posed as a telephone engineer. He also mentions being "someone's former Prime Minister"; the Master was elected Prime Minister during "The Sound of Drums" / "Last of the Time Lords", under the alias Harold Saxon.

== Production ==
The read-through for this episode took place on 21 February 2017, and the main shooting was from 24 February through 28 March.

On 6 March 2017, it was announced the original Mondasian Cybermen from The Tenth Planet would be returning for the finale of the tenth series. Bill is converted into a Cyberman matching the Mondasian design.

The episode's title comes from the Andrew Marvell poem "To His Coy Mistress": "Had we but world enough and time, / This coyness, lady, were no crime."

=== Casting ===
On 6 April 2017, the BBC confirmed that John Simm would be returning as the Master in the tenth series, appearing alongside his successor in the role, Michelle Gomez, for the first story in the programme's history with more than one incarnation of the Master at the same time.

== Broadcast and reception ==
The episode was watched by 3.37 million viewers overnight, one of the lowest ratings for the series. Compared to other programmes that aired on the same night, Doctor Who had an audience share of 22%. The episode received 5.00 million views overall, and it received an Appreciation Index of 85, the joint highest score of Twelfth Doctor episodes along with "Dark Water" from the eighth series.

=== Critical reception ===
Professional ratings
Aggregate scores
Source	Rating
Rotten Tomatoes (Average Score)	9.4/10
Rotten Tomatoes (Tomatometer)	100%
Review scores
Source	Rating
The A.V. Club	A−
Entertainment Weekly	B+
SFX Magazine	4/5 stars
TV Fanatic	4.8/5 stars
IndieWire	A−
IGN	9.0
Vulture	5/5 stars
Radio Times	5/5 stars
Daily Mirror	5/5 stars

"World Enough and Time" received overwhelmingly positive reviews from television critics, with many of them hailing it the best episode of the tenth series, but also criticizing the BBC for spoiling the cliffhanger early on. On Rotten Tomatoes, 100% of 17 reviews are positive for the episode. The website's consensus reads, "'World Enough and Time' sets up the conclusion of Doctor Who's tenth season with a cliffhanger episode that deftly blends many of the show's most important ingredients."

Bradley Russell from SFX Magazine gave the episode a rating of 4 stars out of 5. Stating that the episode was about "playing with expectation", he stated that the episode was the regular mix of science-fiction scares and horror, but that everything felt very slightly out of place. He did, however, compliment the ending of the episode and how it gave more ample motivation to watch the finale episode. He stated that the opening scene of the regeneration was a "cheap tactic" with no answers given, but the idea of Missy filling the Doctor's shoes was far more interesting. He also stated that some scenes were "bordering on unwatchable for young children" and "too slow and filled with exposition".

Scott Collura of IGN gave the episode a 9.0, admiring the character development of Missy through the episode, as she is finally depicted as "out and about as the Mistress", and how Steven Moffat does a good job of deconstructing the name and meaning of the show. He went on to praise "World Enough and Time" as a great buildup for the season finale, noting that "like the Master and Missy themselves, this episode is sort of a two-faced monster – but a good one that seems to be bringing the tenth season to a strong finish". He stated that the episode was full of great science-fiction concepts, high stakes for all of the main and supporting characters, and how the episode was full of "humor, scares, and more".

Ross Ruediger of New York magazine was also extremely positive about the episode, praising Steven Moffat's writing and the script's cleverness, but also indicating that it was easy to see through the disguise of John Simm since the appearance of the Master had been spoiled early on: "Who'd have guessed Simm was returning after all these years? Imagine how much more powerful that reveal could've been!" He stated that the episode aimed to grab the viewer's attention even before the credits, with the regeneration scene, stating that it was a far better "regeneration" than the one that had previously appeared in "The Lie of the Land". He also complimented Rachel Talalay's direction of the episode, after having a track record with Peter Capaldi's series finales.

Giving the episode a perfect score, Patrick Mulkern of Radio Times called it "macabre and riveting", stating that the conversion of Bill Potts into the Mondasian Cyberman and the revelation at the end of the episode "packed more punch" than Jackie Tyler's Cyber-conversion in the second series or Oswin Oswald being revealed as a Dalek in the "Asylum of the Daleks". Mulkern ended his review with praise towards the cliffhanger ending: "The close of World Enough and Time is sublime. Steven Moffat’s script deftly cuts between two scenes of revelation, expertly shot by director Rachel Talalay."
