= The Doctor Falls =

275b – "The Doctor Falls"
- Doctor Who episode

Cast
- Doctor: Peter Capaldi – Twelfth Doctor
- Companions: Pearl Mackie – Bill Potts; Matt Lucas – Nardole
- Others: Michelle Gomez – Missy; John Simm – The Master; Samantha Spiro – Hazran; Briana Shann – Alit; Rosie Boore – Gazron; Simon Coombs – Rexhill; Stephanie Hyam – Heather; Nicholas Briggs – Voice of the Cybermen; David Bradley – First Doctor

Production
- Directed by: Rachel Talalay
- Written by: Steven Moffat
- Produced by: Peter Bennett
- Executive producers: Steven Moffat; Brian Minchin
- Music by: Murray Gold
- Series: Series 10
- Running time: 2nd of 2-part story, 60 minutes
- First broadcast: 1 July 2017

Chronology
← Preceded by "World Enough and Time"	Followed by → "Twice Upon a Time"

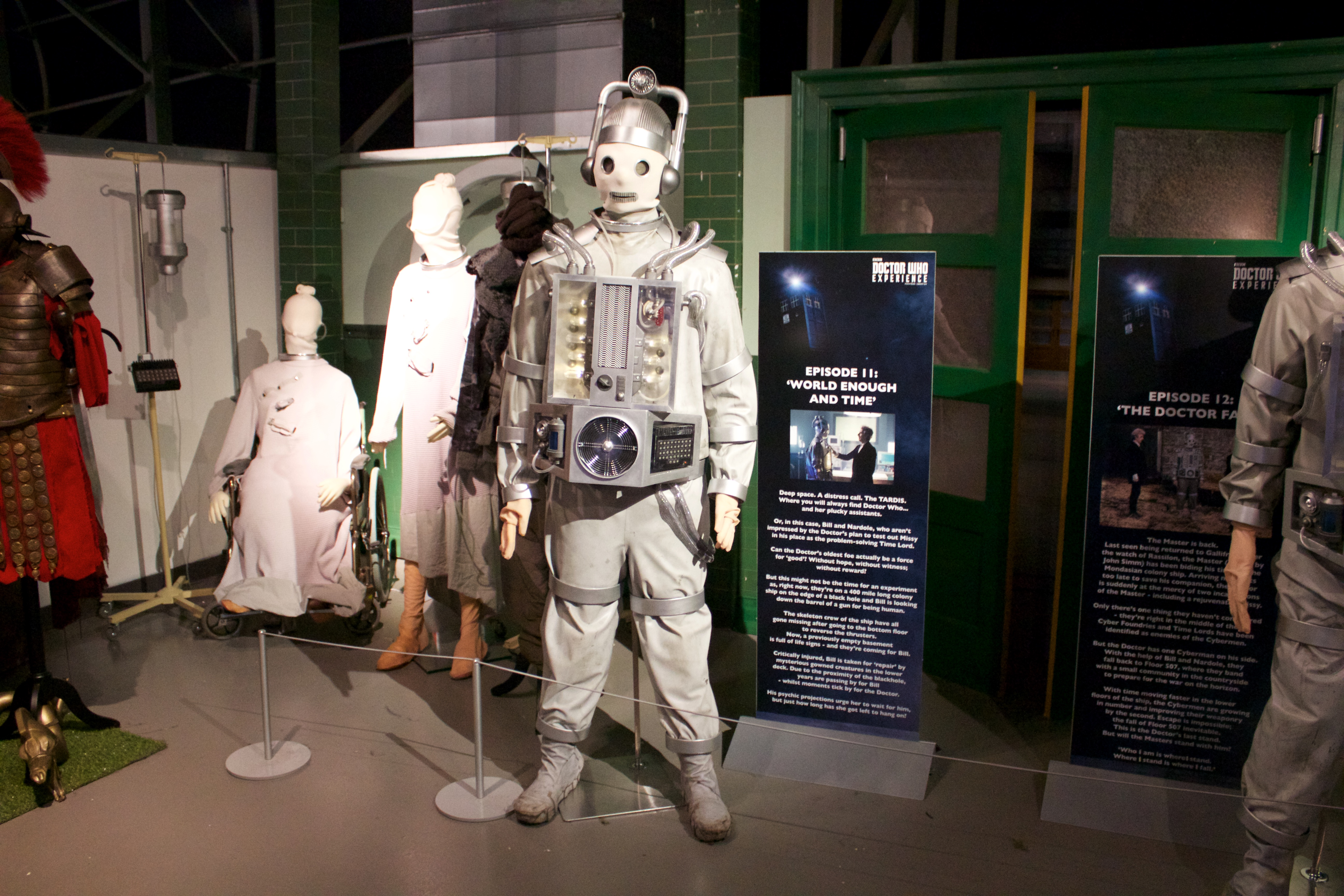
"Tenth Planet" Cyberman

"The Doctor Falls" is the twelfth and final episode of the tenth series, and 839th episode overall, of the British science fiction television series Doctor Who. It was written by Steven Moffat, directed by Rachel Talalay, and was broadcast on 1 July 2017 on BBC One. It is the second episode of a two-part story, the first part being "World Enough and Time".

As a continuation of the previous episode, "The Doctor Falls" concludes the first televised multi-Master story of the show, as well as the origin of the Mondasian Cybermen. In the episode, the Doctor must save himself and the remaining human population of a gigantic colony ship from Mondas, while also dealing with two different incarnations of the Master at once. The episode features a cameo from the First Doctor, now portrayed by David Bradley. He had previously played William Hartnell, the original First Doctor actor, in the 2013 Doctor Who docudrama An Adventure in Space and Time.

The episode was watched by 5.30 million viewers and received much critical praise, with many deeming it a satisfying end to the tenth series. Aspects of the episode that were met with the most praise were Moffat's script, Talalay's direction and Capaldi's performance.

== Plot ==
Continuing from the previous episode, the Master and Missy capture the Doctor, but he had earlier surreptitiously reprogrammed the Cybernet to target Time Lords as well, forcing them to flee. Nardole arrives in a commandeered shuttlecraft to rescue them. The Doctor is electrocuted by a Cyberman, but is saved by Bill.

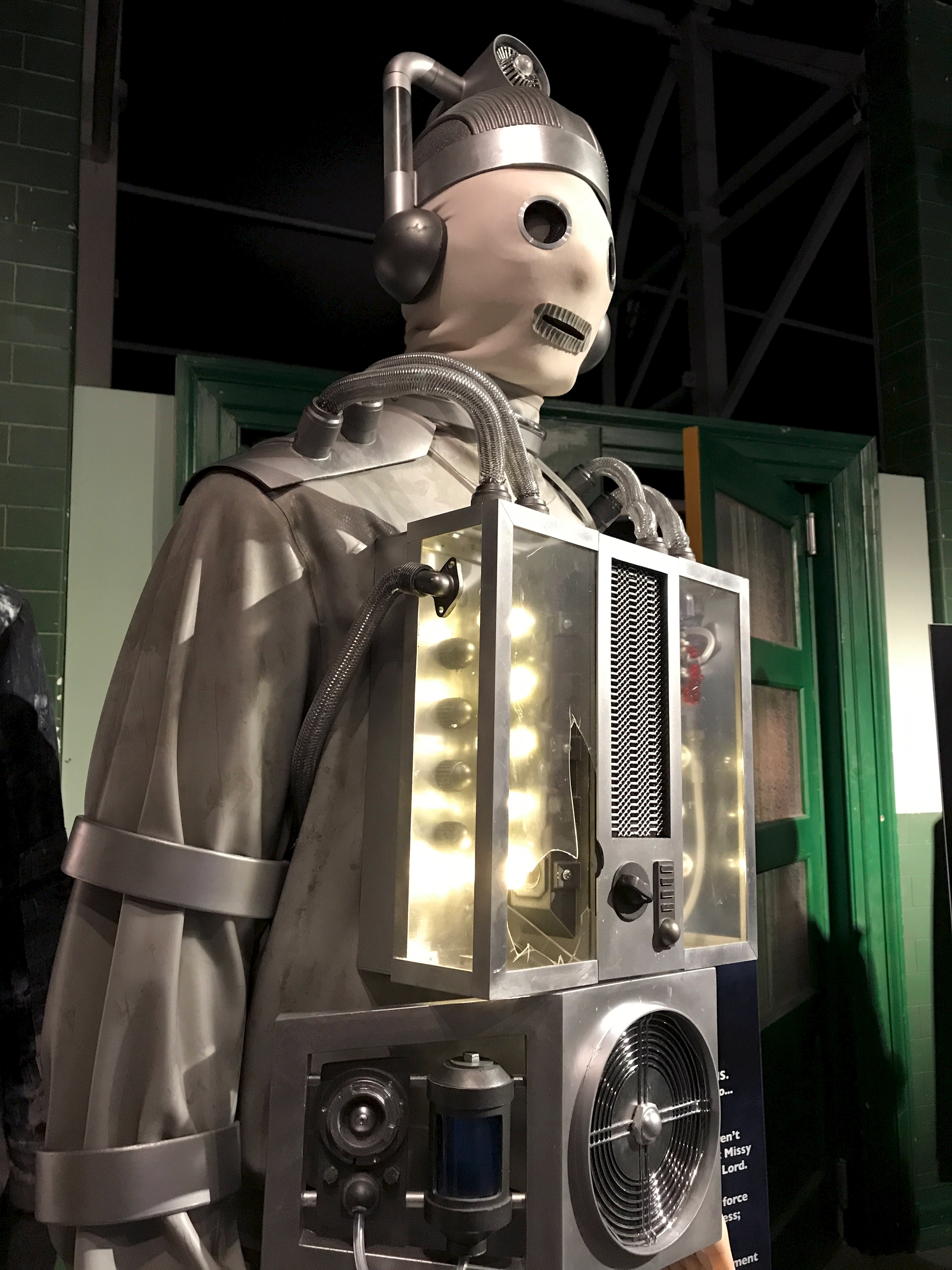
A Mondasian Cyberman, on display at a Doctor Who exhibition

They evacuate to a higher level of the ship containing a solar farm populated by children and a few adults. The Doctor recovers, but suppresses the early signs of regeneration. Bill initially remains unaware of her transformation, her strong mind acting like a perception filter, until one of the children inadvertently reveals the truth to her. Bill sheds a tear, which the Doctor calls a hopeful sign. Missy and the Master discover a camouflaged lift. They call for it, but an upgraded Cyberman arrives, which the group destroys. The Doctor warns that the time dilation affords the Cybermen more time to evolve and strategize.

Nardole discovers the floor directly below the solar farm contains fuel pipes. He is able to trigger controlled explosions, which are used to defeat the Cybermen's initial attack. The Doctor instructs Nardole to lead the human community to a solar farm on another floor and remain there to safeguard them. Bill stays to fight with the Doctor. Despite the Doctor's impassioned plea, Missy and the Master abandon him, intending to take the lift to the lowest level and escape in the Master's TARDIS. Missy, however, changes her mind and stabs the Master. He retaliates by shooting her in the back with his laser screwdriver to prevent her regeneration, and leaves her to die.

An army of Cybermen arrive, but are warded off by the Doctor until he falls after being shot. Surrounded, the Doctor ignites all the fuel pipes, engulfing the farm in a fireball and destroying the Cybermen. As Bill kneels beside the unconscious Doctor, Heather appears, having found Bill through her tears. She saves Bill by transforming her into an oil entity like herself. They carry the Doctor inside his TARDIS, and Heather invites Bill to explore the universe with her, but also assures Bill that she can turn her human again if Bill desires. Bill bids a tearful farewell to the Doctor, hoping to see him again, and then leaves to travel with Heather.

The TARDIS arrives in a snowy landscape and the Doctor awakens, and starts regenerating. Refusing to keep continually changing, he emerges and seemingly stops his regeneration. Within, the cloister bell sounds an alarm as the Doctor encounters his original incarnation.

=== Continuity ===
During the final battle, the Doctor lists the various sites of his encounters with Cybermen: Mondas (The Tenth Planet), Telos (The Tomb of the Cybermen), Planet 14 (The Invasion), Voga (Revenge of the Cybermen), Canary Wharf ("Army of Ghosts" / "Doomsday"), and the Moon (The Moonbase). He also mentions Marinus, a reference to the events of Grant Morrison's Sixth Doctor comic The World Shapers, in which that planet's Voord evolve into Cybermen (though that story also suggests that Mondas, Planet 14, and Marinus are all the same planet).

Missy mentions that the Doctor once died in a fall, referring to events in Logopolis (1981), in which one of her previous incarnations causes the Fourth Doctor to fall from a radio telescope tower.

The Doctor flashes back to several of his former companions from the revived series, who each say "Doctor", similar to what the Fourth Doctor experienced prior to his regeneration in Logopolis. When the Doctor awakens, he quotes himself from previous regenerations: "Sontarans perverting the course of human history" (the Fourth Doctor in Robot), "I don't want to go!" (the Tenth Doctor in "The End of Time"), "When the Doctor was me..." (the Eleventh Doctor in "The Time of the Doctor"), and "It's starting. I'm regenerating!" (the Tenth Doctor in "The Stolen Earth").

The First Doctor's dialogue "You may be a doctor, but I am the Doctor. The original, you might say" references lines spoken by the Fourth Doctor to Harry Sullivan in Robot, and by the First Doctor to Tegan Jovanka in The Five Doctors.

== Production ==
The read through for this episode took place on 21 February 2017. On 6 March 2017 the BBC stated that the work on the final two episodes of the series had begun, "World Enough and Time" and this episode, with Rachel Talalay returning to direct her third consecutive series finale. Filming for the episodes and the series as a whole concluded on 7 April 2017. The final scene involving David Bradley was filmed as part of the filming of the Christmas Special in June 2017.

=== Casting ===
David Bradley appeared at the episode's conclusion as the First Doctor. He had previously portrayed William Hartnell, the First Doctor's actor, in the docudrama An Adventure in Space and Time and appeared as the villain Solomon in "Dinosaurs on a Spaceship", as well as voicing the character of Shansheeth Blue in Death of the Doctor in the Doctor Who spin-off series The Sarah Jane Adventures.

Michelle Gomez had previously announced that she was exiting the role of Missy following the conclusion of series ten.

== Broadcast and reception ==
The episode was watched by 3.75 million viewers overnight, an audience share of 25.3%. The episode received 5.30 million views overall, and it received an Appreciation Index of 83.

=== Critical reception ===
Professional ratings
Aggregate scores
Source	Rating
Rotten Tomatoes (Average Score)	9.3/10
Rotten Tomatoes (Tomatometer)	100%
Review scores
Source	Rating
The A.V. Club	A
Entertainment Weekly	A−
SFX	4.5/5 stars
TV Fanatic	4.2/5 stars
IndieWire	A−
IGN	7.9
Vulture	5/5 stars
Radio Times	5/5 stars
Daily Mirror	5/5 stars
The Daily Telegraph	4/5 stars

"The Doctor Falls" received overwhelmingly positive reviews, with most reviewers finding it a fitting end to the tenth series. The episode holds a score of 100% on Rotten Tomatoes, with the site consensus reading "'The Doctor Falls' offers a dramatic and satisfying end for this iteration of the show's ever-evolving hero." Praise was directed at Moffat's script, Talalay's direction, and Capaldi's performance.

Alasdair Wilkins from The A.V. Club called the episode a "perfect finale", saying that the Twelfth Doctor is a Doctor who knows who he is, portrayed by an actor who knows exactly how he wants to play the part of the character, both of which are played into the narrative of the story and blending into the storyline of the Doctor refusing to regenerate. He complimented how the multiple storylines of the series were wrapped up and brought to a satisfying conclusion, as well as respecting the reality of the character's emotions, which were performed with only a couple of small missteps.

Scott Collura of IGN also praised the dynamic between the two Masters, describing the relationship as a mixture of "brother-sister and boyfriend-girlfriend" and its resultant complexities, and how the intentions of the previous incarnation of the Master was to draw Missy back into the traditional evil manner of the character. He stated that the story made enough sense that "Moffat doesn't really even need to write it on the page". He complimented the appearance of David Bradley as the First Doctor, but stated that extending the storyline of the regeneration out over the two episodes of the finale, as well as the Christmas special, was a great concept but did not work in the context of the episode.

Giving the episode a perfect score, Patrick Mulkern of Radio Times singled out the performances as one of the strong points about the episode, saying that Capaldi, Simm and Gomez worked perfectly well together within the episode. He stated that Capaldi was as magnificent as he had been through the series, and that "The Doctor Falls" was an episode dedicated to him, and how he "stands tall" among the competition of Simm's and Gomez's acting. He stated that Simm's Master was not the "loon" that was portrayed seven years ago, but complimented him nonetheless, and that Gomez's portrayal of Missy and the character's soul-searching was "simply superb".

Daniel Jackson of the Daily Mirror also gave the episode a perfect score, and felt the episode was an immensely satisfying conclusion with great storytelling and epic performances, stating that with all the teasers, build up and trailers that had been released in preparation for the episode, "The Doctor Falls" could have resulted in failure, but he complimented how well it turned out. He stated that the episode was an "immensely satisfying, packed, heart string tugging" conclusion to the series, that was the result of "clever storytelling and tremendous acting". He stated that Capaldi and his performance in the episode "simply shines", and that the Twelfth Doctor had never had a better episode through his era.

The episode received a nomination in the Best Special and Visual Effects category at the 2019 BAFTA Cymru Awards.
