= Empress of Mars =

273 – "Empress of Mars"
- Doctor Who episode

Cast
- Doctor: Peter Capaldi – Twelfth Doctor
- Companions: Pearl Mackie – Bill Potts; Matt Lucas – Nardole
- Others: Michelle Gomez – Missy; Anthony Calf – Godsacre; Ferdinand Kingsley – Catchlove; Richard Ashton – Friday; Adele Lynch – Iraxxa; Glenn Speers – Sergeant Major Peach; Ian Beattie – Jackdaw; Bayo Gbadamosi – Vincey; Ian Hughes – Knibbs; Lesley Ewen – Coolidge; Ysanne Churchman – Voice of Alpha Centauri

Production
- Directed by: Wayne Yip
- Written by: Mark Gatiss
- Produced by: Nikki Wilson
- Executive producers: Steven Moffat; Brian Minchin
- Music by: Murray Gold
- Series: Series 10
- Running time: 44 minutes
- First broadcast: 10 June 2017

Chronology
← Preceded by "The Lie of the Land"	Followed by → "The Eaters of Light"

"Empress of Mars" is the ninth episode of the tenth series of the British science fiction television series Doctor Who. It was written by Mark Gatiss and broadcast on 10 June 2017 on BBC One. "Empress of Mars" received generally positive reviews from television critics.

The Doctor (Peter Capaldi), Nardole (Matt Lucas), and Bill (Pearl Mackie) travel to Mars, but upon arrival, they find themselves in the middle of a conflict between the Ice Warriors and Victorian soldiers. The episode marks the return of the Ice Warriors, last seen in "Cold War", an episode of the seventh series that was also written by Gatiss.

== Synopsis ==
In the present, NASA finds the words "God save the Queen" made of rocks buried under the Mars ice cap. Witnessing this, the Twelfth Doctor, Bill, and Nardole venture to Mars in 1881 to investigate and discover that the planet is occupied by human soldiers from Victorian Britain. Nardole goes back into the TARDIS, but it departs for unexplained reasons, returning to the university in the present day. Nardole asks Missy for help getting back.

The humans have befriended an Ice Warrior they have named Friday. Captain Catchlove says they rescued Friday from his crashed spaceship while on patrol in Africa. In exchange, Friday allowed the soldiers to use his species' technology to travel to Mars, establish a small breathable atmosphere within a cavern, and mine the planet. The Doctor surmises that Friday is using them to access his hive. They soon unearth the tomb of the Ice Empress. Despite Colonel Godsacre's order to not approach it, one guard inadvertently revives the Ice Empress, Iraxxa.

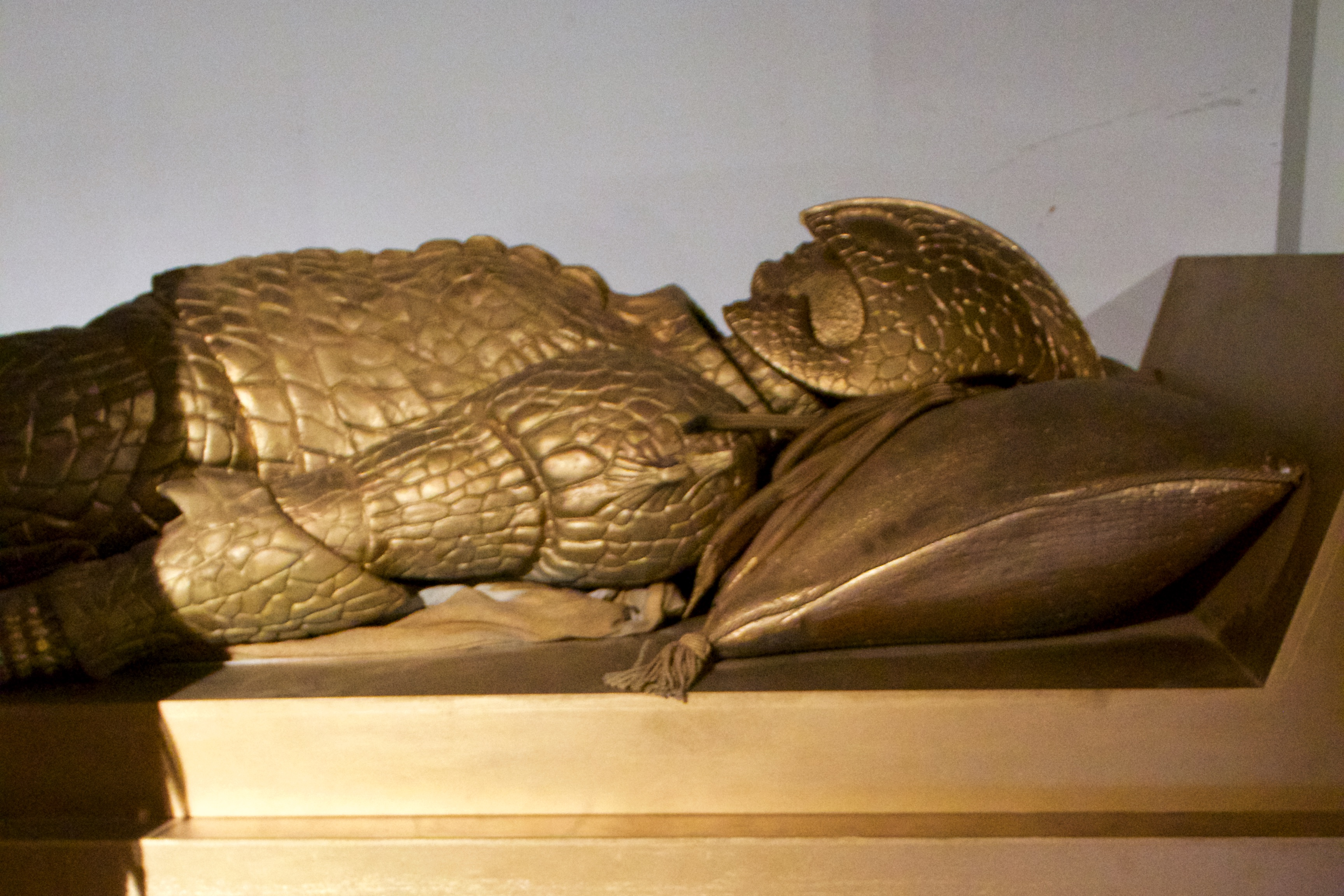
Iraxxa, on display at a Doctor Who exhibition.

Iraxxa's awakening leads to a confrontation with the humans. Friday tells Iraxxa it has been 5,000 years, and Mars' surface is uninhabitable; the Doctor asks Iraxxa to show mercy and gain help from the humans. Dismissing the Doctor and the soldiers, she asks Bill for her opinion, as a fellow woman. She decides to relent based on Bill's word, but then a soldier suddenly fires his rifle, the shot harmlessly glancing off Iraxxa's helmet. Provoked, she returns fire. Catchlove takes command, traps Iraxxa and Friday within the tomb, and locks up the Doctor, Bill, and Godsacre. Inside the tomb, Iraxxa starts reviving more Ice Warriors.

As the Ice Warriors launch their attack, Friday allies himself with the Doctor and Bill after freeing them and helps the Doctor gain control of the mining device. The Doctor threatens to use it to bury them all under the ice cap. Catchlove holds Iraxxa at knifepoint and attempts to force her to help him pilot a spaceship back to Earth. Godsacre manages to surprise Catchlove and kill him, then begs Iraxxa to kill him. Iraxxa calls off the attack in exchange for Godsacre pledging himself to the Ice Warriors. To assist the Ice Warriors, the Doctor covertly contacts Alpha Centauri, a representative of the Galactic Federation he first met in his third incarnation.

The Doctor and Bill help Godsacre leave the message that NASA will discover. Nardole then re-appears with the TARDIS, with Missy piloting the ship. She expresses concern about the Doctor's well-being.

=== Continuity ===
The Doctor's sonic screwdriver still has "no setting for wood", a defect first mentioned in "Silence in the Library". The displayed portrait of Queen Victoria resembles Pauline Collins, who played the role in "Tooth and Claw". Chronologically, the episode partly sets up events of the Third Doctor story The Curse of Peladon (1972), showing the Doctor introducing the Ice Warriors to Alpha Centauri, a representative of the Galactic Federation, which the Ice Warriors have joined by the time of that serial.

=== Outside references ===
The Ice Warrior is named by the soldiers after the character "Friday" from Daniel Defoe's Robinson Crusoe. One of the soldiers sings "She Was Poor But She Was Honest", an English music hall song recorded in 1930 by Billy Bennett. Bill mentions the movies The Vikings, The Terminator, and The Thing, while the Doctor refers to the film Frozen. Upon the discovery of the Ice Empress' tomb, the Doctor says "I've got a bad feeling about this," a recurring phrase in the Star Wars franchise.

== Production ==
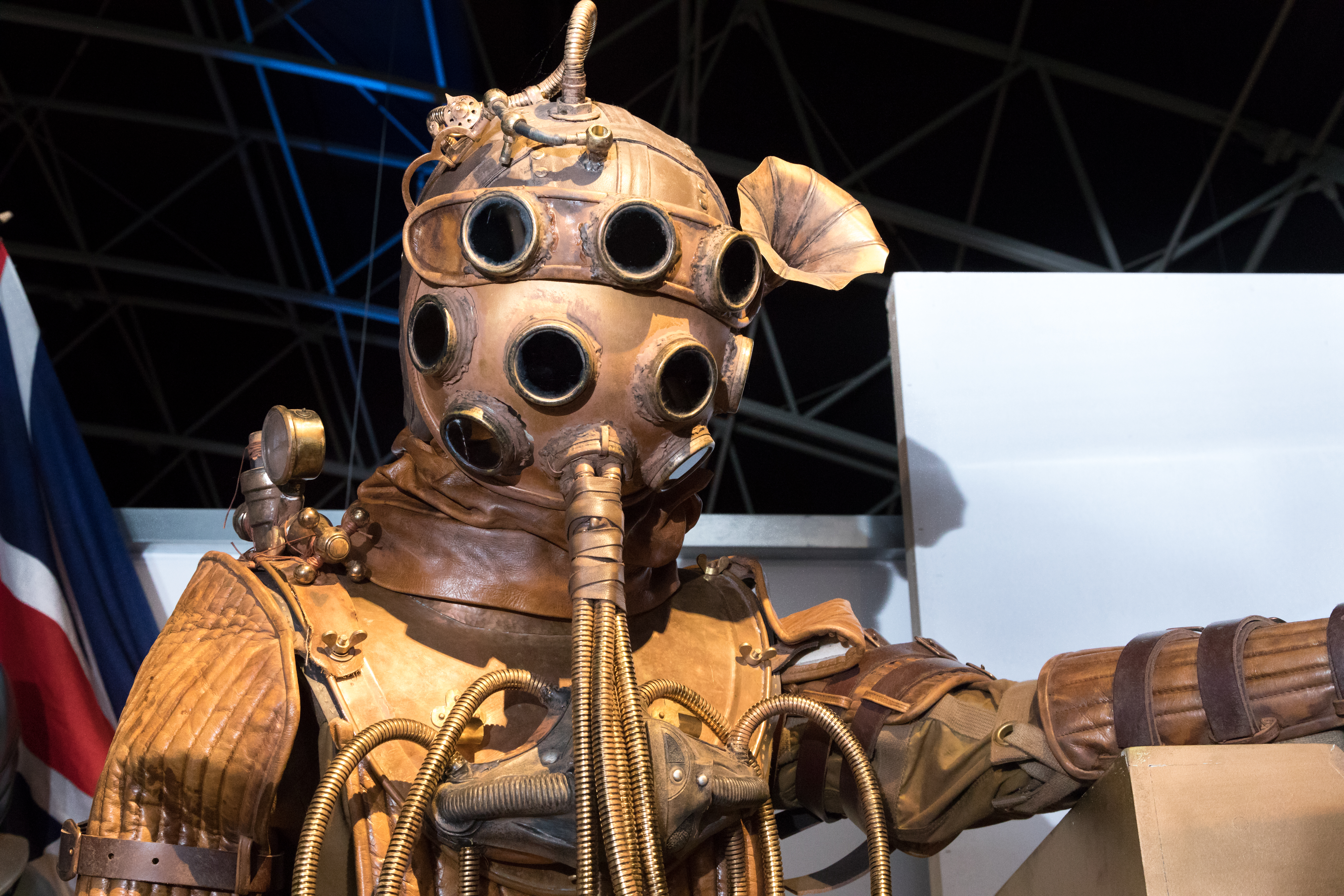
The Victorian spacesuit, on display at a Doctor Who exhibition

The read-through for "Empress of Mars" was on 11 January 2017. Filming with the previous episode "The Lie of the Land" started on 27 January, with principal shooting ending on 22 February.

=== Writing ===
Gatiss originally planned a sequel to his ninth series episode "Sleep No More", but on learning that both Moffat and Capaldi were leaving the series decided instead to write "the story I've always wanted to do". Gatiss considered setting the episode on Peladon, but chose Mars instead due to the similar "corridors with flaming torches" style of the following episode.

=== Cast notes ===
Alpha Centauri is voiced by Ysanne Churchman, who originally voiced the character in The Curse of Peladon and The Monster of Peladon.

== Broadcast and reception ==
The episode was watched by 3.58 million overnight. The episode received 5.02 million views overall, and it received an Appreciation Index of 83.

=== Critical reception ===
Professional ratings
Aggregate scores
Source	Rating
Rotten Tomatoes (Tomatometer)	92%
Rotten Tomatoes (Average Rating)	7.9/10
Review scores
Source	Rating
The A.V. Club	B−
Entertainment Weekly	B+
SFX Magazine	3.5/5 stars
TV Fanatic	3.2/5 stars
IGN	8.2
New York Magazine	5/5 stars
Radio Times	5/5 stars
Daily Mirror	3/5 stars

"Empress of Mars" was met with generally positive reviews from television critics. The episode received positive reviews from 92% of 13 critics on Rotten Tomatoes, and the site consensus reads, "'The Empress of Mars' gives fans an entertaining standalone breather between major arcs that makes the most of its leads' considerable chemistry."

Nivea Serrao of Entertainment Weekly awarded the episode a grade of B+, approving the story and comparing it to Hidden Figures. He commented how the episode addresses the issue where "no one side is truly right in the end", and gives the Ice Warriors a definition other than a "clear-cut villain" like the Daleks or Cybermen. He stated that Ferdinand Kingsley's character of Catchlove was an "effective villain" with his "fun-to-hate portrayal". Gatiss' combination of different themes within the episode was also commented upon in a positive light and the connection between Iraxxa and Bill with their shared gender.

Zoe Delahunty-Light of SFX Magazine gave the episode three-and-a-half stars out of five. She described the episode as "stoic" and "dependable" overall, with an "awkward" beginning and one that "missed the chance to add an extra dimension to its characters". Delahunty-Light commented on how the Ice Warriors appeared to be a villain that appeared to want to destroy the soldiers with no solid reason given. She praised the return of Alpha Centauri in the episode, finding it a fun reference for long-standing fans of the programme.

Ross Ruediger of New York Magazine gave the episode a perfect score of 5 out of 5 stars, approving the return of the Ice Warriors after their previous appearance in the seventh series. He stated that the episode was an episode dedicated to "honor, loyalty, and redemption", and enjoyed Gatiss' script. He commented on how there appeared to be no reason why the TARDIS disappeared from Mars but also complimented how complicated Missy's arc appeared to be, on whether she had redeemed herself or if it was an elaborate plan. He stated that the best features of the episode were Adele Lynch's portrayal of Iraxxa, and also the classic movie references throughout the episode.

Patrick Mulkern from the Radio Times also gave the episode a score of 5 stars out of 5, appreciating the story and stating that it was "well-crafted". He liked how Gatiss was able to give more depth to the characters of this episode than the characters that had appeared in previous episodes of the series, and also the complex nature of the Ice Warriors, and how they displayed their typical honour, strength, and loyalty, but were also able to be negotiated with.
