= The Lie of the Land =

272 – "The Lie of the Land"
- Doctor Who episode

Cast
- Doctor: Peter Capaldi – Twelfth Doctor
- Companions: Pearl Mackie – Bill Potts; Matt Lucas – Nardole
- Others: Michelle Gomez – Missy; Emma Handy – Mother; Beatrice Curnew – Group Commander; Stewart Wright – Alan; Solomon Israel – Richard; Jamie Hill – Monk; Rosie Jane – Bill's Mum

Production
- Directed by: Wayne Yip
- Written by: Toby Whithouse
- Produced by: Nikki Wilson
- Executive producers: Steven Moffat; Brian Minchin
- Music by: Murray Gold
- Series: Series 10
- Running time: 45 minutes
- First broadcast: 3 June 2017

Chronology
| ← Preceded by "The Pyramid at the End of the World" | Followed by → "Empress of Mars" |

"The Lie of the Land" is the eighth episode of the tenth series of the British science fiction television series Doctor Who. Written by Toby Whithouse, it was broadcast on 3 June 2017 on BBC One. "The Lie of the Land" received mixed reviews from television critics.

Continuing on after Bill (Pearl Mackie) gives her consent to the Monks, she and Nardole (Matt Lucas) have to find a way to rescue the Doctor (Peter Capaldi) after he is imprisoned, and end the Monks' invasion of Earth. It is the third and final of three connected episodes known as "The Monks Trilogy".

== Synopsis ==
The Monks are rulers of the Earth, and appear to have been on Earth for millions of years, guiding human development. Bill and a few others are aware of the truth: the Monks have only been present on Earth for six months. Those who hold this view are imprisoned for "memory crimes" (manufacturing and distributing propaganda that details the truth) and sentenced to labour camps. The Twelfth Doctor appears on television praising the Monks' guidance over humanity.

Bill keeps herself grounded in reality by imagining that she is talking with her long-dead mother, based on pictures the Doctor gave her. Nardole, who survived the bacteria due to his alien physiology and is also aware of the truth, locates Bill and helps her to find the prison hulk where the Doctor is thought to be a captive. Inside, after a team of commandos swarm inside, the Doctor tells Bill he is cooperating willingly with the Monks, believing that humanity was doomed without their guidance. Bill becomes distraught and shoots the Doctor, who appears to begin regenerating, but quickly stops. The entire scenario is revealed to have been a test by Nardole, the Doctor, and the team, to make sure Bill was not under the influence of the Monks.

At the university where the Doctor and Bill work, they enter the Vault to talk to Missy, who says she has encountered the Monks before. She confirms the Monks maintain control by broadcasting a signal containing the false history to their subjugated victims via the numerous statues they have built across Earth, enabled by a psychic link established through the person who originally gave "consent"; Missy claims she defeated them during her own encounter by killing that individual. The implication is that Bill must die as the one who gave consent on Earth.

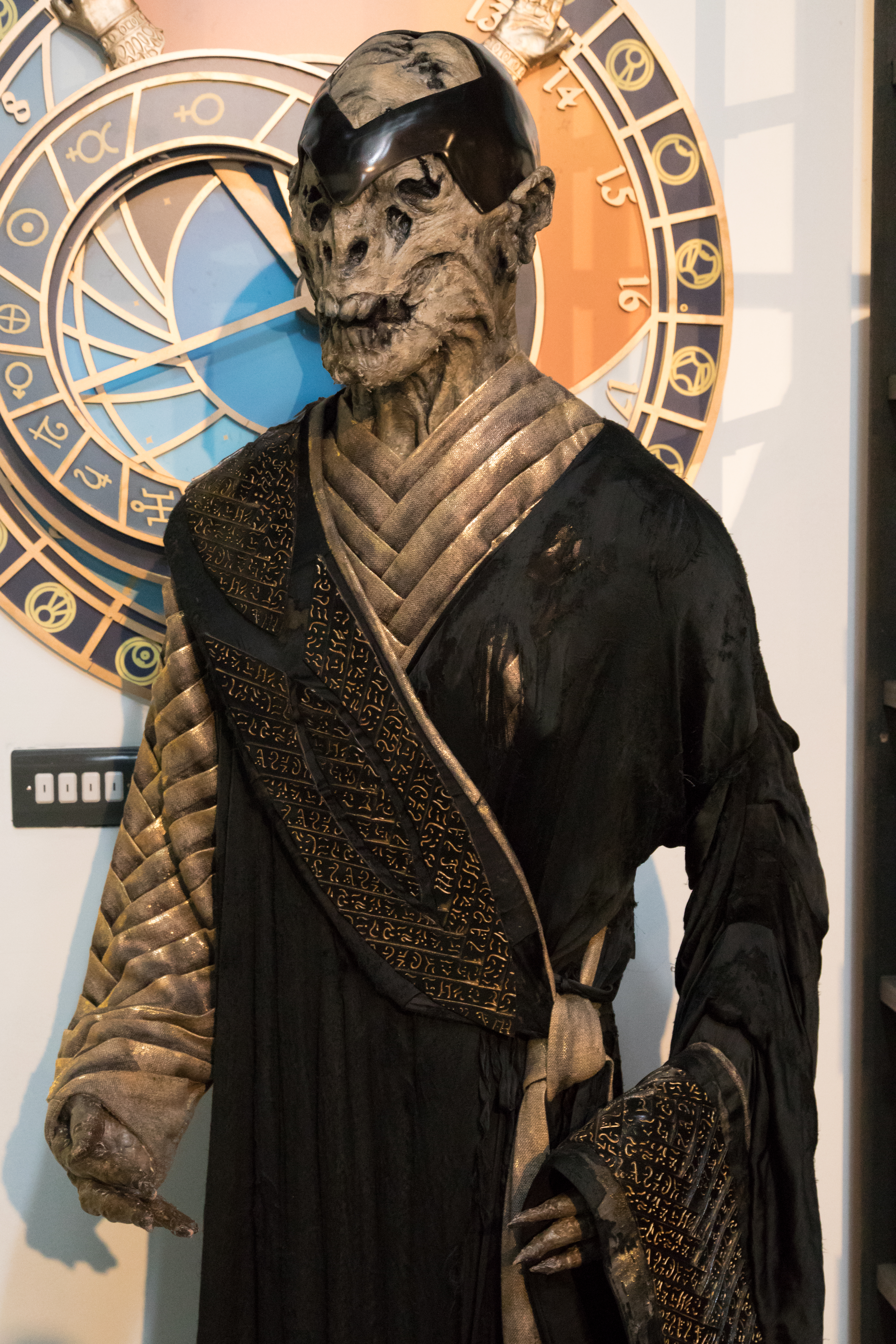
The controlling Monk, on display at a Doctor Who exhibition

Believing there is another solution, the Doctor, Bill, Nardole, and the commandos infiltrate the Monks' pyramid in London so that the Doctor can hijack their broadcast with his own mind to break the psychic transmission. In the central chamber, the Doctor attempts to link his mind to the controlling Monk, who after a struggle overpowers the Doctor. Bill intends to sacrifice herself, linking her own mind to the Monks', despite the Doctor's protests. The Monks unintentionally replace their broadcast with images of Bill's mother, which the Doctor recognizes as a strong, loving memory in Bill's mind. Humanity recovers from the Monks' lies and rebels against them. The Doctor, Bill, and Nardole watch as the Monks abandon Earth. Sometime later, the Doctor and Bill find that most of humanity have no recollection of the Monks. In the Vault, Missy expresses remorse for those she has killed.

=== Continuity ===
In images showing the Monks' aid to humanity, clips from the stories "Blink", "Nightmare in Silver" and "Into the Dalek" are shown. Later, a clip from "The Pilot" is shown, as well as several still images from past episodes of the tenth series. Magpie Electrical, which debuted in "The Idiot's Lantern" and recurs throughout the revival series, is shown as the shop where Bill watches one of the Doctor's broadcasts.

=== Outside references ===
Missy briefly plays selections from Eric Satie's Gnossienne No. 1 and Scott Joplin's "The Entertainer" on her piano.

== Production ==
The read-through for "The Lie of the Land" took place on 11 January 2017. Filming took place, alongside the subsequent episode "Empress of Mars", from 16 January to 22 February 2017.

In Missy's initial scene, the visual of her eyes superimposed over a panning shot is an homage to a similar scene from the 1996 film.

A scene was recorded featuring a family watching an episode of Casualty. This specially filmed scene included Casualty's Connie Beauchamp and Noel Garcia interacting with the Monks as part of the story line. Both characters were played by their regular actors Amanda Mealing and Tony Marshall. Despite being referred to in the Doctor Who Magazine preview of the episode, the scene was ultimately cut from the broadcast version.

== Broadcast and reception ==
The episode was watched by 3.01 million overnight, the series' lowest overnight rating in its history at the time, after the rating of 3.10 million for Battlefield in 1989. This was due to the episode being placed directly against the Britain's Got Talent final. The episode received 4.82 million views overall, at the time the lowest official rating since the programme's return in 2005, and it received an Appreciation Index of 82.

=== Critical reception ===
Professional ratings
Aggregate scores
| Source | Rating |
|---|---|
| Rotten Tomatoes (Tomatometer) | 83% |
| Rotten Tomatoes (Average Score) | 7.3/10 |
Review scores
| Source | Rating |
| The A.V. Club | B− |
| Entertainment Weekly | B |
| SFX Magazine | 5/5 stars |
| IndieWire | B |
| IGN | 8.7 |
| New York Magazine | 3/5 stars |
| Radio Times | 2/5 stars |
| Daily Mirror | 2/5 stars |

Press reaction to "The Lie of the Land" was "mixed, with a number of reviewers finding it the weakest story in the season so far". The episode holds a score of 83% on Rotten Tomatoes, and the website's consensus states, "'The Lie of the Land' closes a significant chapter for Doctor Who's tenth season—yet leaves some major characters' fates tantalizingly open."

Alasdair Wilkins of The A.V. Club gave the episode a score of B−, stating that he felt disappointed in the episode, and how the script and its quality were "outpaced" by the skills of Capaldi's and Mackie's acting, stating that Capaldi was "great as ever but [his] talents are sometimes misused in service of ideas the story won't commit to". He did, however, compliment Michelle Gomez for her role as Missy yet again.

Zoe Delahunty-Light of SFX Magazine gave "The Lie of the Land" a perfect score of 5 stars out of 5, calling the episode "chilling", and complimenting the idea of the Monks taking over the human race and its development. She commented especially upon Pearl Mackie, complimenting her on her role in leading the episode, and her "uncanny ability to transition between emotions flawlessly", especially concerning her scenes with the Doctor and his apparent betrayal. Delahunty-Light also went on to praise how Missy finally got more screen time than she had received in previous episodes.

Ross Ruediger of New York magazine gave the episode 3 stars out of 5, stating that the episode started out as "disturbingly effective", but that certain questions arising from the episode were "frustratingly unanswered". He also felt that the Monks had become far less of a danger than they had been in the previous episode, and that it made little sense that the Monks did not defend their leader in the climactic scene. Overall, he stated that "The Lie of the Land" was a "disappointing conclusion to what was an otherwise killer story line".

Patrick Mulkern from Radio Times also gave the episode a lower rating, grading it 2 stars out of 5. He felt that the worst part of the episode was the poor decision to have a companion fire a gun at the Doctor; the viewers saw "nothing that would push her to such an extreme act", and this could not be "rationalised or condoned". He described the actors as being "blocked awkwardly" and that they appeared uncomfortable in the situation, though he complimented their acting overall throughout the episode.
