= Rebecca Benson =

British actress

- Born: 24 April 1990 (age 36); Edinburgh, Scotland
- Occupation: Actress
- Years active: 2011–present

Rebecca Benson (born 24 April 1990) is a Scottish actress. She appeared in the TV crime dramas Vera and Shetland, and alongside Michael Fassbender in the 2015 film, Macbeth.

== Career ==
In 2016, Benson joined the HBO series Game of Thrones in season 6 as Talla Tarly, the sister of Samwell Tarly. She also portrayed Margaret Pole, Countess of Salisbury in The White Princess.

Benson starred as Eli in the National Theatre of Scotland production of Let the Right One In, which opened in the United States at St. Ann's Warehouse, Brooklyn, in January 2015.

In 2019, she appeared as Melody, an intern, in Flack.

== Filmography ==
=== Film ===
Year	Title	Role
2011	You Instead	Lucie
2015	Macbeth	Maidservant
2020	Falling for Figaro	Rosa

=== Television ===
Year	Title	Role	Notes
2012	Holby City	Kitty Johnson	Episode: "Wolf's Clothing"
2013	Vera	Ruthie Culvert	
2014	Shetland	Sally Henry	
2016	Game of Thrones	Talla Tarly	Episode: "Blood of My Blood"
2016	The Crown	Queen Mary's Nurse	
2017	The White Princess	Margaret Pole	
2017	Doctor Who	Kar	Episode: "The Eaters of Light"
2019–2020	Flack	Melody	Main role
2019	Year of the Rabbit	Harriet Fisher	Episode: #1.2
2023	Payback	Kathleen	Recurring role
2024	Insomnia	Nurse Laura	Recurring role
2024	Grantchester	Rose Shirley	Episode: S9 E2

=== Radio ===
Date	Title	Role	Director	Station
16 January 2015	Take Me to the Necropolis	Sasha	Kirsty Williams	BBC Radio 4 Afternoon Play

=== Video game ===
Year	Title	Role
2022	Xenoblade Chronicles 3	Fiona
