= The Pilot (Doctor Who) =

265 – "The Pilot"
- Doctor Who episode

Cast
- Doctor: Peter Capaldi – Twelfth Doctor
- Companions: Pearl Mackie – Bill Potts; Matt Lucas – Nardole
- Others: Jennifer Hennessy – Moira; Stephanie Hyam – Heather; Nicholas Briggs – Voice of the Daleks

Production
- Directed by: Lawrence Gough
- Written by: Steven Moffat
- Produced by: Peter Bennett
- Executive producers: Steven Moffat; Brian Minchin
- Music by: Murray Gold
- Series: Series 10
- Running time: 50 minutes
- First broadcast: 15 April 2017

Chronology
← Preceded by "The Return of Doctor Mysterio"	Followed by → "Smile"

"The Pilot" is the first episode of the tenth series of the British science fiction television series Doctor Who. It was written by Steven Moffat and broadcast on 15 April 2017 on BBC One. "The Pilot" received generally positive reviews, with praise on the introduction of Pearl Mackie, and how the episode served both as a soft reboot and as a series premiere.

It is the first episode to feature Mackie as the new companion Bill Potts, after the departure of Jenna Coleman at the end of the previous series. The episode also sees the brief return of the Daleks, their last major appearance being that of the previous series' premiere, "The Magician's Apprentice" / "The Witch's Familiar", in 2015.

== Minisode: "Friend from the Future" ==
A three-minute sequence billed as an exclusive scene from a future episode was released on 23 April 2016, under the title "Friend from the Future". The sequence was originally written as an audition scene for casting the role of Bill, but the production team included some of the footage in the final edit of "The Pilot".

From a hidden corner of a corridor inside a spaceship, the Doctor attempts to answer Bill's questions about their enemies. Bill finds them amusing at first, but the Doctor persists and she realises they are in real danger.

== Plot ==
The Twelfth Doctor and Nardole have been living for decades under the guises of a university professor and his assistant. Bill Potts, who works at the university's canteen, is called to the Doctor's office, where he notes she attends all his lectures, and offers to officially enroll her in his course, provided that she maintains top grades throughout the programme.

Months pass, and Bill develops a mutual attraction to a student named Heather, who has a defect that makes it look like there is a star in her eye. Heather asks her to inspect a mysterious puddle, asking her if she can see what is wrong with her reflection, but Bill does not notice anything except that her face seems wrong somehow. Bill turns around and Heather has left. Within the puddle, a voice proclaims that a search for a pilot has begun. In December, Bill gifts the Doctor a vintage rug for Christmas, and offhandedly mentions that her birth mother died when she was a baby and hardly had any photographs taken of herself. At her home, Bill's foster mother gives her a box of her birth mother's photographs, and Bill sees that the Doctor took each of them with his camera.

In January, Bill meets Heather again, who encourages her to look into the puddle once more, then apparently vanishes. Bill admits her concerns to the Doctor, who investigates and realises that their reflections are not mirrored as they should be, concluding that they are not reflections but something mimicking them and that the puddle is not made of water. After taking a sample of the liquid and noticing some nearby scorch marks, the Doctor sends Bill home, fearing for her safety. Bill returns to her flat, and is chased by a moving body of fluid, which takes Heather's form. She runs to the Doctor's office, where fluid-Heather materialises, forcing him and Bill into the TARDIS. The Doctor moves the TARDIS elsewhere in the university, where he and Nardole check on a vault they have been guarding. They conclude that fluid-Heather is only interested in Bill just as the creature appears, causing the trio to flee in the TARDIS.

The TARDIS lands again on a boat in Sydney Harbour, where the Doctor admits that he is an alien. The fluid-Heather arrives again, having travelled the planet in just a minute. The Doctor takes them to another planet millions of years into the future, but she finds them again. The Doctor speculates that the substance is a living fluid from an alien ship, and that it made Heather its "pilot" because she wanted to run away. He decides to have Heather chase them through a battle between the Daleks and the Movellans. The fluid-Heather takes a shot meant for the Doctor and Bill. Bill convinces Heather – who is bound by her earlier promise never to leave her and wants to make her a passenger – to let her go, and Heather departs after a tearful farewell with Bill, leaving her tears on Bill's face.

The Doctor and Bill return to his university office, where he attempts to wipe Bill's memories of the day's events in order to protect his identity, but changes his mind after Bill questions his decision to wipe her memories. As Bill leaves the grounds, she finds the Doctor waiting for her with the TARDIS, and agrees to travel with him.

=== Continuity ===
The Doctor keeps framed pictures of his wife, River Song, and granddaughter, Susan Foreman, on his desk, along with a collection of his sonic screwdrivers from both the classic and revival series.

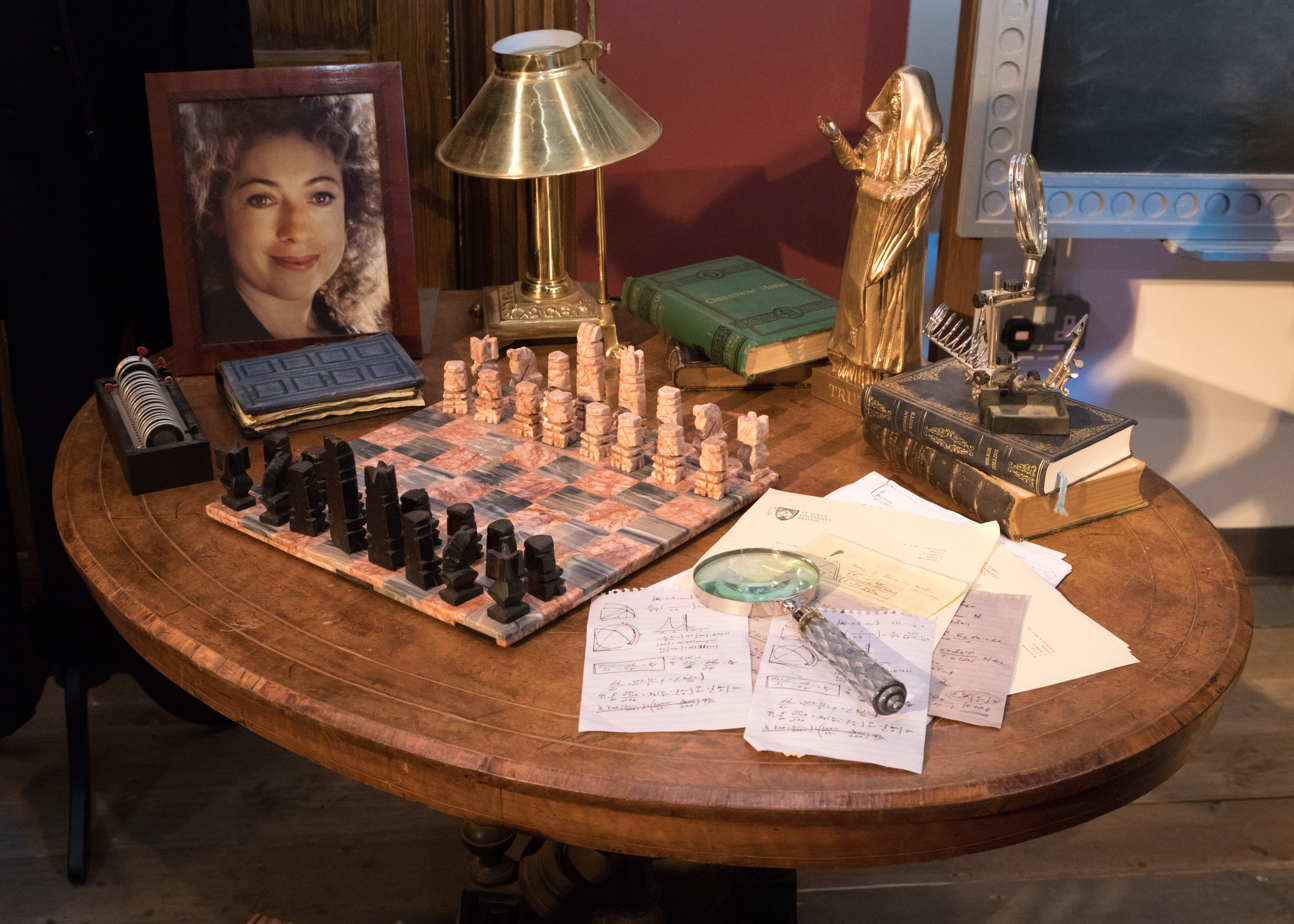
Some of the items on the Doctor's desk in the episode, on display at a Doctor Who exhibition

While being chased by the sentient oil through time, the TARDIS crew journeys to a battle in the war between the Daleks and Movellans, first mentioned in the Fourth Doctor story Destiny of the Daleks (1979).

The Doctor prepares to wipe Bill's memories of her experiences with him in the same way he wiped Donna Noble's memories in "Journey's End" (2008). When Bill asks The Doctor how he would feel having his memory wiped, Clara's theme plays in the background, referencing events of the Series 9 finale "Hell Bent".

== Production ==
The read-through for this episode and the next episode, "Smile", took place on 14 June 2016. Filming for these episodes began on 20 June 2016 and concluded on 28 July 2016. The episode was originally titled "A Star in Her Eye"; it was announced a month before its broadcast in March 2017 that the title had been changed to "The Pilot", to reflect the "rebooting" of the programme with the new series.

=== Cast notes ===
This is the first episode to feature Pearl Mackie as companion Bill Potts.

It also marks the second appearance of Jennifer Hennessy in Doctor Who, who last appeared as Valerie in the third-series episode "Gridlock" (2007). Stephanie Hyam's character Heather appears again at the end of the season in the episode The Doctor Falls.

== Broadcast and reception ==
The episode was watched by 4.64 million viewers overnight, a slight increase on the opener for the last series, and came third in the ratings behind All Round to Mrs. Brown's and Britain's Got Talent. The episode received 6.68 million views overall and received an Appreciation Index score of 83.

=== Cinemas ===
The episode had a cinema screening in the U.S. on 17 and 19 April 2017, two and four days respectively after the episode's initial broadcast. The screening of "The Pilot" was followed by a screening of "For Tonight We Might Die", the premiere episode of the spin-off series Class, and behind-the-scenes footage of Pearl Mackie and her journey through the series.

The episode was screened in Australian cinemas on 16 April 2017. The screening included a bonus feature, "Becoming The Companion".

=== Critical reception ===
Professional ratings
Aggregate scores
Source	Rating
Rotten Tomatoes (Tomatometer)	94%
Rotten Tomatoes (Average Rating)	7.5/10
Review scores
Source	Rating
The A.V. Club	B
Entertainment Weekly	A−
SFX Magazine	3.5/5 stars
TV Fanatic	4.5/5 stars
IndieWire	B+
IGN	8.3
New York Magazine	4/5 stars
Radio Times	4/5 stars
Daily Telegraph	4/5 stars

"The Pilot" received positive reviews, with praise for the introduction of Mackie's Bill. Some critics noted how the episode's structure allowed it to serve as a reboot as well as a season premiere. On Rotten Tomatoes, 94% of 17 reviews are positive and the critical consensus states, "'The Pilot' successfully reboots the final season of Capaldi's Doctor Who and deftly introduces Pearl Mackie with fresh character development."

Alasdair Wilkins of The A.V. Club awarded "The Pilot" a 'B', calling the episode "a solid introduction to Bill as the new companion, with Pearl Mackie bringing an energy distinct from any previous new series companion". He closed his review by saying, "With a promising TARDIS season and two very strong seasons in the show’s immediate past, there’s plenty of reason to be optimistic that “The Pilot” is the lightweight but necessary table-setting before the real fun begins".

Nivea Serrao of Entertainment Weekly gave the episode a rating of "A−", describing the episode as a "fresh start" for both the show and Capaldi's Doctor, who she said was criticised for "being too dark, and his Doctor not as fun" in the previous series. Zoe Delahunty-Light of Games Radar, while claiming that the introduction of Bill was taken too quickly and the alien "left a bit to be desired", otherwise praised the episode, saying "The Pilot" "lays enough groundwork for some decent stories in season 10" and praised the character of Bill. TV Fanatics's Kathleen Wiedel described Mackie as "brilliant" and also praised the episode's pace, Nardole's comedy and the villain. She also praised the emotional resonance of the scene in which the Doctor went back in time to take photos of Bill's deceased mother. Hanh Nguyen of IndieWire gave the episode a rating of B+, saying the episode "felt familiar and comfortable", despite the introduction of Bill Potts in the episode.

IGN's Scott Collura gave the episode the rating of 8.3, describing the episode as an "amicable and fun introduction" and said the episode "hits some standard Who checkpoints". He also described the episode as "a fun if mostly lightweight excursion for the Doctor". Collura also said he "instantly fell" for the character of Bill. Ross Ruediger of New York Magazine gave the episode 4 of 5 stars, describing Bill as "a wonderful change of pace" compared to previous companions, and also praised the mystery in the episode.

Before the episode was broadcast, Patrick Mulkern of Radio Times gave a positive review of the episode, describing Pearl Mackie as "instantly winning as fledgling companion Bill", and also praising Nardole's "impeccable comic timing, spinning snarky asides, peculiar squeals and amusing lines" and described the episode as a "complete reboot". He also gave the episode a positive review after the episode was broadcast, praising how Bill and Heather's romance fitted into the plot of the episode.

Ben Lawrence of The Telegraph said Mackie gave her character "a humanity and a warmth", saying it was missing from the character of Clara Oswald, and said Bill being "sweet and vulnerable" made her fit with Capaldi's character. He gave the episode 4 of 5 stars, saying it did not "[push] all the buttons" but overall gave the episode a good review. Catherine Gee of The Telegraph gave a mixed-to-negative review, saying the episode was "a clunky introduction" to the series, that it was "let down by a flimsy storyline, clunky special effects and an underdeveloped foe". Gee said Mackie was "doing a good job" but she "lacked the charismatic spark of Jenna Coleman", whilst acknowledging this was Mackie's first role in television. Gee found the character of Bill a "muddle", but praised the show for presenting a character whose background is not middle-class. She then went on to criticise Murray Gold's score.

Den of Geek's Simon Brew also gave a positive review of the episode, saying despite this series premiere not being as energetic as previous series premieres, it was "good fun" praising the humour in the episode and Mackie's performance. Digital Spy's Morgan Jeffery gave the episode a mainly positive review and considered the episode to be a "soft reboot" which was enjoyable for both established viewers and those new to the show. Jeffery found Mackie to be "immediately engaging" and a good match with Capaldi's Doctor. He also praised the visual presentation and "taut direction" but felt the show lost its way to some extent in the last 10 minutes and that Nardole was somewhat superfluous to the story.
