= Pearl Mackie =

British actress (born 1987)

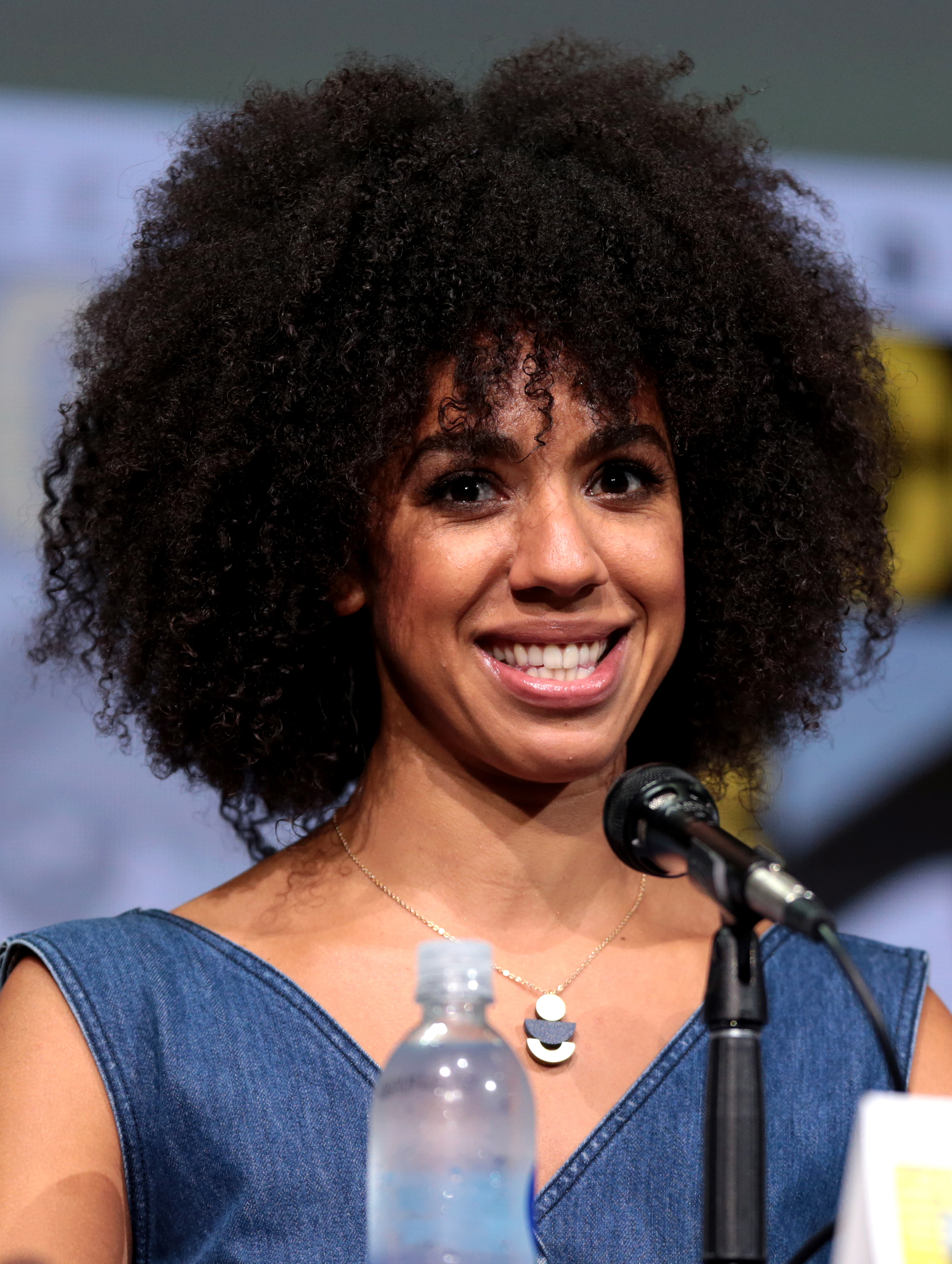
- Mackie at the 2017 San Diego Comic-Con
- Born: 29 May 1987 (age 39); London, England
- Education: University of Bristol; Bristol Old Vic Theatre School
- Occupation: Actress
- Years active: 2010–present
- Spouse: Kam Chhokar (m. 2024)
- Relatives: Philip Mackie (grandfather)

Pearl Mackie (born 29 May 1987) is a British actress. She is best known for playing Bill Potts in the long-running television series Doctor Who. Mackie is a graduate of the Bristol Old Vic Theatre School. Her first major television role came in 2014, when she played Anne-Marie Frasier in BBC One soap opera Doctors.

== Early life ==
Pearl Mackie was born on 29 May 1987 in South London. She grew up in Brixton in south London and is of paternal West Indian and maternal English descent. She is the granddaughter of Philip Mackie, who wrote the screenplay for The Naked Civil Servant. She was educated at Burntwood School in Tooting. She earned a degree in Drama from the University of Bristol, and speaks English, French and Spanish. During her studies she went to workshops and took part in many extra-curricular plays.

In 2010 she graduated from the Bristol Old Vic Theatre School. In the same year Mackie was nominated for the BBC Carleton Hobbs Award for outstanding duologues in the school play Noughts & Crosses.

== Career ==
Mackie appeared in an early mainstream role as a front of house girl in the 2013 music comedy Svengali. In 2014, Mackie played Anne-Marie Frasier in Doctors and the young computer genius Mia in Crystal Springs at the Park Theatre in London. She could also be seen in the political satire Obama-ology at the Finborough theatre in west London, playing Cece and Caits, two young women finding their voice.

In 2015, she performed in the National Theatre's West End production of The Curious Incident of the Dog in the Night Time. In the same year Mackie appeared in the short film Date Aid by Bond, a satirical public service announcement. Mackie has also worked as an acting tutor for Troupers, a company that teaches theatre skills to children and young people.

On 23 April 2016, it was announced that Mackie would be playing Bill Potts, the companion of The Doctor in the British television series Doctor Who. It was also announced in March 2017 that Bill would be the first openly gay main companion in the series.

After production on Series 10 of Doctor Who had wrapped, Mackie joined a production of Harold Pinter's The Birthday Party as Lulu. The production – costarring Stephen Mangan, Toby Jones, and Zoë Wanamaker – opened in January 2018 at London's Harold Pinter Theatre.

In 2020, she guest starred as Lucy 1 in Friday Night Dinner. In addition, she had a recurring role on the American television series The Diplomat as Alysse.

In 2025, she appeared in the Death in Paradise Christmas special, with Kate Ashfield, Josie Lawrence and Billy Harris.

== Personal life ==
On 28 June 2020, Mackie came out as bisexual in an Instagram post. She and her partner Kam Chhokar announced their engagement on 19 January 2022, and married on 4 May 2024.

== Filmography ==
Key
†	Denotes productions that have not yet been released

=== Film ===
Year	Title	Role	Notes
2013	Svengali	Front of House girl	
2015	Date Aid	Sarah	Short film
2018	Origami	Heather	Short film
2019	Greed	Cathy	
2020	Horizon Line	Pascale	
2020	The Lennox Report	Tarnia	Short film
2020	Copycats	Lady Isabelle Sausage	Short film
2022	The Deal	Kabira	
2023	Your Move	Patricia	Short film
2024	Tyger	Sarah	

=== Television ===
Year	Title	Role	Notes
2014	Doctors	Anne-Marie Frasier	Episode: "Love Is Blind"
2017	Doctor Who	Bill Potts	13 episodes
2018	The Crystal Maze	Sleeping Beauty	Episode: "Celebrity Christmas Special"
2018	Gods of Medicine	Elsa Powers	2 episodes
2019	Urban Myths	Kay	Episode: "Andy & The Donald"
2019	Pops and Branwell	Pops Popowski (voice)	Short animated film
2020	Friday Night Dinner	Lucy One	2 episodes
2021	The Long Call	DS Jen Rafferty	4 episodes
2022	Lloyd of the Flies	Gena (voice)	17 episodes
2022	Best & Bester	Grafifi (voice)	13 episodes
2023	Tom Jones	Honour Newton	4 episodes
2023–2024	The Diplomat	Alysse	12 episodes
2025	Death in Paradise	Karen Hickson	1 episode

=== Radio ===
Year	Title	Role	Production	Notes	Ref.
2013	Great Expectations	Miss Havisham	BBC Radio 4		
2013	Romeo and Juliet	Juliet			
2017	Adulting	Charlotte	BBC Radio 2	6 episodes	
2018	Proposal	Lucy	BBC Radio 2		
2019	Prepper	Rachel	BBC Radio 4	4 episodes	
2019	Forest 404	Pan	BBC Radio 4	27 episodes	
2021	Doctor Faustus	Wagner	BBC Radio 3		

=== Theatre ===
Year	Title	Role	Theatre	Location	Ref.
2010	The Comedy of Errors	Adriana	Circomedia	Bristol	
2010	The Crucible	Tituba	Theatre Royal	Bristol	
2012	Only Human	Nina	Theatre503	London	
2012	Home	Woman 1 / Pattie Mae	The Last Refuge	London	
2014	Crystal Springs	Mia	Park Theatre	London	
2014	Obama-ology	Cece	Finborough Theatre	London	
2014	Disnatured	Regan	RIFT Theatre	London	
2014	Hello Kind World	Unknown	The Drayton Arms	London	
2015	The Helen Project	Helen of Troy	The Face to Face Festival	London	
2015	A Mad World, My Masters	Truly Kidman	Theatre Royal	Brighton	
2015–2016	The Curious Incident of the Dog in the Night-Time	Punk Girl / Information Lady / No.40	Gielgud Theatre	London	
2018	The Birthday Party	Lulu	Harold Pinter Theatre	London	
2020	Bubble	Ashley	Nottingham Playhouse	Nottingham	
2024–2025	Ballet Shoes	Sylvia	National Theatre	London	
2026	Baby	All roles	Brixton House	London	

=== Audio ===
Year	Title	Role	Notes	Ref.
2017	The Last Namsara	Asha		
2019	The Conception of Terror	Mika Chantry		
2020	Ladybird Stories for Rainy Days	Narrator		
2020	Beatrix Potter: The Complete Tales	Narrator		
2020	Paper Thin	Vanessa		
2020	Cold Comfort Farm	Narrator		
2021	Sour Hall	Ash	6 episodes	
2022	Delphine Jones Takes a Chance	Narrator		

=== Music videos ===
Year	Title	Artist	Director	Role
2014	"Real"	Years & Years	Robert Francis Müller	Clubber

=== Commercials ===
Year	Brand	Company	Ref.
2020	Westgate Oxford	VCCP	
2020	Uber	72andSunny	
2020	Barclays	Publicis	
2020	Sainsbury's	Global Radio	
2020	Diet Coke	Wieden+Kennedy	

== Accolades ==
=== Awards ===
- 2018: Screen Nation Film & TV Awards – Female Performance in TV for Doctor Who

=== Nominations ===
- 2010: BBC Carleton Hobbs Awards – Outstanding Duologues for the BOVTS play Noughts & Crosses (shared with Roddy Peters)
- 2017: TV Times Awards – Favourite Newcomer for Doctor Who
- 2017: Heat's Unmissables Awards – Best Actress for Doctor Who
- 2021: Critics' Choice Documentary Awards – Best Narration for The Real Charlie Chaplin
- 2022: DIVA Awards – Actor of the Year

=== Honorable mentions ===
- 2020: Screen Nation Film & TV Awards – Female Performance in TV for various roles
