= List of Doctor Who writers =

This is a list of television writers for the science fiction television programme Doctor Who. The list defaults to ascending alphabetical order by writer's last name, though is sortable by a number of different criteria.

== List of writers ==
| Writer (Note: A "writer" is defined by this list as the person or persons who received onscreen credit for writing the script. This column sorts by the last name of the individual. It does not include such credits as: "based on an idea by", "story by", and other such creative credits that fall short of scriptwriting credit.) | No. of stories (Note: A "story" is a grouping of one of more episodes that form a single narrative. In the classic era, a "story" was a single serial, which might have comprised anywhere from one to twelve episodes, although the most common number was four. For the revived era, most stories have been a single episode in length. Where multi-part stories have been produced by the BBC, the titles of all parts are given so as to indicate the entirety of the story. Writers are credited with a fraction of a story if their name appears on only some of the episodes within a single story.) | No. of episodes | List of stories | First story year | Last story year | Ref. |
|---|---|---|---|---|---|---|
| Ben Aaronovitch | 2 | 8 | Remembrance of the Daleks (1988); Battlefield (1989) | 1988 | 1989 | |
| Douglas Adams | 2 (Note: Shada was left unfinished during the original production of season 17. It was eventually completed for the DVD and Blu-ray release in 2017, 16 years after Adams died, and seven years after director Pennant Roberts died. This version was broadcast on American television in 2018. It would have originally aired in the United Kingdom from 19 January to 23 February 1980.) | 10 | The Pirate Planet (1978); Shada (2017) | 1978 | 2017 | |
| "David Agnew" | 2 | 10 | The Invasion of Time (1978); City of Death (1979) | 1978 | 1979 | |
| Maxine Alderton | 1.16 (Note: Alderton wrote one of Flux's six episodes.) | 2 | "The Haunting of Villa Diodati" (2020); Flux (2021) (episode 4, "Village of the Angels", only; co-written with Chris Chibnall) | 2020 | 2021 | |
| Sharma Angel-Walfall | 1 | 1 | "The Well" (2025) (co-written with Russell T Davies) | 2025 | 2025 | |
| "Norman Ashby" (Mervyn Haisman and Henry Lincoln) | 1 | 5 | The Dominators (1968) | 1968 | 1968 | |
| Christopher Bailey | 2 | 8 | Kinda (1982); Snakedance (1983) | 1982 | 1983 | |
| Bob Baker | 9 | 36 | The Claws of Axos (1971, co-written with Dave Martin); The Mutants (1972, co-written with Dave Martin); The Three Doctors (1972–73, co-written with Dave Martin); The Sontaran Experiment (1975, co-written with Dave Martin); The Hand of Fear (1976, co-written with Dave Martin); The Invisible Enemy (1977, co-written with Dave Martin); Underworld (1978, co-written with Dave Martin); The Armageddon Factor (1979, co-written with Dave Martin); Nightmare of Eden (1979) | 1971 | 1979 | |
| Pip and Jane Baker | 3.5 | 11 | The Mark of the Rani (1985); Terror of the Vervoids (1986); The Ultimate Foe (1986, part 2); Time and the Rani (1987) | 1985 | 1987 | |
| Mike Bartlett | 1 | 1 | "Knock Knock" (2017) | 2017 | 2017 | |
| Christopher H. Bidmead | 3 | 12 | Logopolis (1981); Castrovalva (1982); Frontios (1984) | 1981 | 1984 | |
| Ian Stuart Black | 3 | 12 | The Savages (1966); The War Machines (1966); The Macra Terror (1967) | 1966 | 1967 | |
| Malorie Blackman | 1 | 1 | "Rosa" (2018) (co-written by Chris Chibnall) | 2018 | 2018 | |
| "Robin Bland" (Terrance Dicks and Robert Holmes) | 1 | 4 | The Brain of Morbius (1976) | 1976 | 1976 | |
| Chris Boucher | 3 | 12 | The Face of Evil (1977); The Robots of Death (1977); Image of the Fendahl (1977) | 1977 | 1977 | |
| Ian Briggs | 2 | 7 | Dragonfire (1987); The Curse of Fenric (1989) | 1987 | 1989 | |
| Johnny Byrne | 3 | 12 | The Keeper of Traken (1981); Arc of Infinity (1983); Warriors of the Deep (1984) | 1981 | 1984 | |
| Chris Chibnall | 20 | 28 | "42" (2007); "The Hungry Earth" / "Cold Blood" (2010); "Dinosaurs on a Spaceship" (2012); "The Power of Three" (2012); "The Woman Who Fell to Earth" (2018); "The Ghost Monument" (2018); "Rosa" (2018) (co-written with Malorie Blackman); "Arachnids in the UK" (2018); "The Tsuranga Conundrum" (2018); "The Battle of Ranskoor Av Kolos" (2018); "Resolution" (2019); "Spyfall" (2020); "Fugitive of the Judoon" (2020) (co-written with Vinay Patel); "Praxeus" (2020) (co-written with Pete McTighe); "Can You Hear Me?" (2020) (co-written with Charlene James); "Ascension of the Cybermen" / "The Timeless Children" (2020); "Revolution of the Daleks"; Flux (2021) (part 4, "Village of the Angels", co-written with Maxine Alderton); "Eve of the Daleks" (2022); "Legend of the Sea Devils" (2022) (co-written with Ella Road); "The Power of the Doctor" (2022) | 2007 | 2022 | |
| Kevin Clarke | 1 | 3 | Silver Nemesis (1988) | 1988 | 1988 | |
| Barbara Clegg | 1 | 4 | Enlightenment (1983) | 1983 | 1983 | |
| Anthony Coburn | 1 | 4 | An Unearthly Child (1963) | 1963 | 1963 | |
| Paul Cornell | 2 | 3 | "Father's Day" (2005); "Human Nature" / "The Family of Blood" (2007) | 2005 | 2007 | |
| Donald Cotton | 2 | 8 | The Myth Makers (1965); The Gunfighters (1966) | 1965 | 1966 | |
| Frank Cottrell-Boyce | 2 | 2 | "In the Forest of the Night" (2014); "Smile" (2017) | 2014 | 2017 | |
| Neil Cross | 2 | 2 | "The Rings of Akhaten" (2013); "Hide" (2013) | 2013 | 2013 | |
| Graeme Curry | 1 | 3 | The Happiness Patrol (1988) | 1988 | 1988 | |
| Richard Curtis | 1 | 1 | "Vincent and the Doctor" (2010) | 2010 | 2010 | |
| Russell T Davies | 38 | 47 | "Rose" (2005); "The End of the World" (2005); "Aliens of London"/"World War Three" (2005); "The Long Game" (2005); "Boom Town" (2005); "Bad Wolf"/"The Parting of the Ways" (2005); "The Christmas Invasion" (2005); "New Earth" (2006); "Tooth and Claw" (2006); "Love & Monsters" (2006); "Army of Ghosts"/"Doomsday" (2006); "The Runaway Bride" (2006); "Smith and Jones" (2007); "Gridlock" (2007); "Utopia"/"The Sound of Drums"/"Last of the Time Lords" (2007); "Voyage of the Damned" (2007); "Partners in Crime" (2008); "Midnight" (2008); "Turn Left" (2008); "The Stolen Earth"/"Journey's End" (2008); "The Next Doctor" (2008); "Planet of the Dead" (2009) (co-written with Gareth Roberts); "The Waters of Mars" (2009) (co-written with Phil Ford); "The End of Time" (2009–10); "The Star Beast" (2023); "Wild Blue Yonder" (2023); "The Giggle" (2023); "The Church on Ruby Road" (2023); "Space Babies" (2024); "The Devil's Chord" (2024); "73 Yards" (2024); "Dot and Bubble" (2024); "The Legend of Ruby Sunday"/"Empire of Death" (2024); "The Robot Revolution" (2025); "Lux" (2025); "The Well" (2025) (co-written with Sharma Angel-Walfall); "Wish World"/"The Reality War" (2025) | 2005 | 2025 | |
| Gerry Davis | 3.5 | 14 | The Tenth Planet (1966) (episodes 3 and 4; co-written with Kit Pedler); The Highlanders (1966–67) (co-written with Elwyn Jones); The Tomb of the Cybermen (1967) (co-written with Kit Pedler); Revenge of the Cybermen (1975) | 1966 | 1975 | |
| Juno Dawson | 1 | 1 | "The Interstellar Song Contest" (2025) | 2025 | 2025 | |
| Terrance Dicks | 5 | 23 | The Seeds of Death (1969) (episodes 3–6, uncredited); The War Games (1969); Robot (1974–75); Horror of Fang Rock (1977); State of Decay (1980); "The Five Doctors" (1983) | 1969 | 1983 | |
| Sarah Dollard | 2 | 2 | "Face the Raven" (2015); "Thin Ice" (2017) | 2015 | 2017 | |
| Terence Dudley | 3 | 8 | Four to Doomsday (1982); Black Orchid (1982); The King's Demons (1983) | 1982 | 1983 | |
| Inua Ellams | 1 | 1 | "The Story & the Engine" (2025) | 2025 | 2025 | |
| David Ellis | 1 | 6 | The Faceless Ones (1967, co-written with Malcolm Hulke) | 1967 | 1967 | |
| William Emms | 1 | 4 | Galaxy 4 (1965) | 1965 | 1965 | |
| Paul Erickson | 1 | 4 | The Ark (1966, co-written with Lesley Scott) | 1966 | 1966 | |
| David Fisher | 4 | 16 | The Stones of Blood (1978); The Androids of Tara (1978); The Creature from the Pit (1979); The Leisure Hive (1980) | 1978 | 1980 | |
| John Flanagan | 1 | 4 | Meglos (1980, co-written with Andrew McCulloch) | 1980 | 1980 | |
| Phil Ford | 2 | 2 | "The Waters of Mars" (2009) (co-written with Russell T Davies); "Into the Dalek" (2014) (co-written with Steven Moffat) | 2009 | 2014 | |
| Neil Gaiman | 2 | 2 | "The Doctor's Wife" (2011); "Nightmare in Silver" (2013) | 2011 | 2013 | |
| Stephen Gallagher | 2 | 8 | Warriors' Gate (1981); Terminus (1983) | 1981 | 1983 | |
| Mark Gatiss | 9 | 9 | "The Unquiet Dead" (2005); "The Idiot's Lantern" (2006); "Victory of the Daleks" (2010); "Night Terrors" (2011); "Cold War" (2013); "The Crimson Horror" (2013); "Robot of Sherwood" (2014); "Sleep No More" (2015); "Empress of Mars" (2017) | 2005 | 2017 | |
| Matthew Graham | 2 | 3 | "Fear Her" (2006); "The Rebel Flesh" / "The Almost People" (2011) | 2006 | 2011 | |
| Stephen Greenhorn | 2 | 2 | "The Lazarus Experiment" (2007); "The Doctor's Daughter" (2008) | 2007 | 2008 | |
| Peter Grimwade | 3 | 12 | Time-Flight (1982); Mawdryn Undead (1983); Planet of Fire (1984) | 1982 | 1984 | |
| Mervyn Haisman | 2 | 12 | The Abominable Snowmen (1967, co-written with Henry Lincoln); The Web of Fear (1968, co-written with Henry Lincoln) | 1967 | 1968 | |
| Peter Harness | 3 | 4 | "Kill the Moon" (2014); "The Zygon Invasion" / "The Zygon Inversion" (2015) ("The Zygon Inversion" co-written with Steven Moffat); "The Pyramid at the End of the World" (2017) (co-written with Steven Moffat) | 2014 | 2017 | |
| "Stephen Harris" (Lewis Greifer and Robert Holmes) | 1 | 4 | Pyramids of Mars (1975) | 1975 | 1975 | |
| Brian Hayles | 6 | 30 | "The Celestial Toymaker" (1966); "The Smugglers" (1966); "The Ice Warriors" (1967); "The Seeds of Death" (1969); "The Curse of Peladon" (1972); "The Monster of Peladon" (1974) | 1966 | 1974 | |
| Kate Herron | 1 | 1 | "Rogue" (2024, co-written with Briony Redman) | 2024 | 2024 | |
| Ed Hime | 2 | 2 | "It Takes You Away" (2018); "Orphan 55" (2020) | 2018 | 2020 | |
| Robert Holmes | 15.5 | 64 | The Krotons (1968–69); The Space Pirates (1969); Spearhead from Space (1970); Terror of the Autons (1971); Carnival of Monsters (1973); The Time Warrior (1973–74); The Ark in Space (1975); The Deadly Assassin (1976); The Talons of Weng-Chiang (1977); The Sun Makers (1977); The Ribos Operation (1978); The Power of Kroll (1978–79); The Caves of Androzani (1984); The Two Doctors (1985); The Mysterious Planet (1986); The Ultimate Foe (1986, part 1) | 1968 | 1986 | |
| Don Houghton | 2 | 13 | Inferno (1970); The Mind of Evil (1971) | 1970 | 1971 | |
| Malcolm Hulke | 7 | 47 | The Faceless Ones (1967, co-written with David Ellis); The War Games (1969, co-written with Terrance Dicks); Doctor Who and the Silurians (1970); Colony in Space (1971); The Sea Devils (1972); Frontier in Space (1973); Invasion of the Dinosaurs (1974) | 1967 | 1974 | |
| Matthew Jacobs | 1 | 1 | Doctor Who (1996) | 1996 | 1996 | |
| Charlene James | 1 | 1 | "Can You Hear Me?" (2020) | 2020 | 2020 | |
| Elwyn Jones | 1 | 4 | The Highlanders (1966–67) (co-written with Gerry Davis) | 1966 | 1967 | |
| Glyn Jones | 1 | 4 | The Space Museum (1965) | 1965 | 1965 | |
| Matt Jones | 1 | 2 | "The Impossible Planet" / "The Satan Pit" (2006) | 2006 | 2006 | |
| Malcolm Kohll | 1 | 3 | Delta and the Bannermen (1987) | 1987 | 1987 | |
| "Guy Leopold" (Barry Letts and Robert Sloman) | 1 | 5 | The Dæmons (1971) | 1971 | 1971 | |
| Henry Lincoln | 2 | 12 | The Abominable Snowmen (1967, co-written with Mervyn Haisman); The Web of Fear (1968, co-written with Mervyn Haisman) | 1967 | 1968 | |
| Peter Ling | 1 | 4 | The Mind Robber (1968) | 1968 | 1968 | |
| John Lucarotti | 3 | 15 | Marco Polo (1964); The Aztecs (1964); The Massacre (1966) (episode 4 co-written with Donald Tosh) | 1964 | 1966 | |
| Tom MacRae | 2 | 3 | "Rise of the Cybermen" / "The Age of Steel" (2006); "The Girl Who Waited" (2011) | 2006 | 2011 | |
| Louis Marks | 4 | 15 | Planet of Giants (1965); Day of the Daleks (1972); Planet of Evil (1975); The Masque of Mandragora (1976) | 1965 | 1976 | |
| Dave Martin | 8 | 32 | The Claws of Axos (1971) (co-written with Bob Baker); The Mutants (1972) (co-written with Bob Baker); The Three Doctors (1972–73) (co-written with Bob Baker); The Sontaran Experiment (1975) (co-written with Bob Baker); The Hand of Fear (1976) (co-written with Bob Baker); The Invisible Enemy (1977) (co-written with Bob Baker); Underworld (1978) (co-written with Bob Baker); The Armageddon Factor (1979) (co-written with Bob Baker) | 1971 | 1979 | |
| Philip Martin | 2 | 6 | Vengeance on Varos (1985); Mindwarp (1986) | 1985 | 1986 | |
| Jamie Mathieson | 4 | 4 | "Mummy on the Orient Express" (2014); "Flatline" (2014); "The Girl Who Died" (2015) (co-written with Steven Moffat); "Oxygen" (2017) | 2014 | 2017 | |
| Glen McCoy | 1 | 2 | Timelash (1985) | 1985 | 1985 | |
| Andrew McCulloch | 1 | 4 | Meglos (1980, co-written with John Flanagan) | 1980 | 1980 | |
| Pete McTighe | 3 | 3 | "Kerblam!" (2018); "Praxeus" (2020) (co-written with Chris Chibnall); "Lucky Day" (2025) | 2018 | 2025 | |
| Nina Metivier | 1 | 1 | "Nikola Tesla's Night of Terror" (2020) | 2020 | 2020 | |
| Steven Moffat | 42.5 (Note: Moffat is only credited on the second part of the two-parter "The Zygon Invasion"/"The Zygon Inversion".) | 51 | "The Empty Child" / "The Doctor Dances" (2005); "The Girl in the Fireplace" (2006); "Blink" (2007); "Silence in the Library" / "Forest of the Dead" (2008); "The Eleventh Hour" (2010); "The Beast Below" (2010); "The Time of Angels" / "Flesh and Stone" (2010); "The Pandorica Opens" / "The Big Bang" (2010); "A Christmas Carol" (2010); "The Impossible Astronaut" / "Day of the Moon" (2011); "A Good Man Goes to War" (2011); "Let's Kill Hitler" (2011); "The Wedding of River Song" (2011); "The Doctor, the Widow and the Wardrobe" (2011); "Asylum of the Daleks" (2012); "The Angels Take Manhattan" (2012); "The Snowmen" (2012); "The Bells of Saint John" (2013); "The Name of the Doctor" (2013); "The Night of the Doctor" (2013); "The Day of the Doctor" (2013); "The Time of the Doctor" (2013); "Deep Breath" (2014); "Into the Dalek" (2014) (co-written with Phil Ford); "Listen" (2014); "Time Heist" (2014) (co-written with Steve Thompson); "The Caretaker" (2014) (co-written with Gareth Roberts); "Dark Water" / "Death in Heaven" (2014); "Last Christmas" (2014); "The Magician's Apprentice" / "The Witch's Familiar" (2015); "The Girl Who Died" (2015) (co-written with Jamie Mathieson); "The Zygon Inversion" (2015) (co-written with Peter Harness); "Heaven Sent" (2015); "Hell Bent" (2015); "The Husbands of River Song" (2015); "The Return of Doctor Mysterio" (2016); "The Pilot" (2017); "Extremis" (2017); "The Pyramid at the End of the World" (2017) (co-written with Peter Harness); "World Enough and Time" / "The Doctor Falls" (2017); "Twice Upon a Time" (2017); "Boom" (2024); "Joy to the World" (2024) | 2005 | 2024 | |
| Paula Moore | 1 | 2 | Attack of the Cybermen (1985) | 1985 | 1985 | |
| James Moran | 1 | 1 | "The Fires of Pompeii" (2008) | 2008 | 2008 | |
| Rona Munro | 2 | 4 | Survival (1989); "The Eaters of Light" (2017) | 1989 | 2017 | |
| Terry Nation | 10.5 | 56 | The Daleks (1963–64); The Keys of Marinus (1964); The Dalek Invasion of Earth (1964); The Chase (1965); Mission to the Unknown (1965); The Daleks' Master Plan (1965–66) (episodes 1-5, 7); Planet of the Daleks (1973); Death to the Daleks (1974); Genesis of the Daleks (1975); The Android Invasion (1975); Destiny of the Daleks (1979) | 1963 | 1979 | |
| Peter R. Newman | 1 | 6 | The Sensorites (1964) | 1964 | 1964 | |
| Simon Nye | 1 | 1 | "Amy's Choice" (2010) | 2010 | 2010 | |
| Geoffrey Orme | 1 | 4 | The Underwater Menace (1967) | 1967 | 1967 | |
| Vinay Patel | 2 | 2 | "Demons of the Punjab" (2018); "Fugitive of the Judoon" (2020) (with Chris Chibnall) | 2018 | 2020 | |
| Kit Pedler | 3 | 12 | The Tenth Planet (all episodes; episodes 3 and 4 co-written with Gerry Davis, 1966); The Moonbase (1967); The Tomb of the Cybermen (1967) (co-written with Gerry Davis) | 1966 | 1967 | |
| Victor Pemberton | 1 | 6 | Fury from the Deep (1968) | 1968 | 1968 | |
| Marc Platt | 1 | 3 | Ghost Light (1989) | 1989 | 1989 | |
| Eric Pringle | 1 | 2 | The Awakening (1984) | 1984 | 1984 | |
| Helen Raynor | 2 | 4 | "Daleks in Manhattan" / "Evolution of the Daleks" (2007); "The Sontaran Stratagem" / "The Poison Sky" (2008) | 2007 | 2008 | |
| Anthony Read | 1 | 4 | The Horns of Nimon (1979–80) | 1979 | 1979 | |
| Briony Redman | 1 | 1 | "Rogue" (2024, co-written with Kate Herron) | 2024 | 2024 | |
| Ella Road | 1 | 1 | "Legend of the Sea Devils" (2022) (co-written with Chris Chibnall) | 2022 | 2022 | |
| Gareth Roberts | 6 | 6 | "The Shakespeare Code" (2007); "The Unicorn and the Wasp" (2008); "Planet of the Dead" (2009, co-written with Russell T Davies); "The Lodger" (2010); "Closing Time" (2011); "The Caretaker" (2014, co-written with Steven Moffat) | 2007 | 2014 | |
| Eric Saward | 4 | 12 | The Visitation (1982); Earthshock (1982); Resurrection of the Daleks (1984); Revelation of the Daleks (1985) | 1982 | 1985 | |
| Lesley Scott | 1 | 4 | The Ark (1966, co-written with Paul Erickson) | 1966 | 1966 | |
| Robert Shearman | 1 | 1 | "Dalek" (2005) | 2005 | 2005 | |
| Derrick Sherwin | 1 | 8 | The Invasion (1968) | 1968 | 1968 | |
| Robert Sloman | 3 | 18 | The Time Monster (1972); The Green Death (1973); Planet of the Spiders (1974) | 1972 | 1974 | |
| Andrew Smith | 1 | 4 | Full Circle (1980) | 1980 | 1980 | |
| Dennis Spooner | 3.5 | 20 | The Reign of Terror (1964); The Romans (1965); The Time Meddler (1965); The Daleks' Master Plan (1965–66) (episodes 6,8-12) | 1964 | 1966 | |
| Anthony Steven | 1 | 4 | The Twin Dilemma (1984) | 1984 | 1984 | |
| Robert Banks Stewart | 2 | 10 | Terror of the Zygons (1975); The Seeds of Doom (1976) | 1975 | 1976 | |
| Bill Strutton | 1 | 6 | The Web Planet (1965) | 1965 | 1965 | |
| Keith Temple | 1 | 1 | "Planet of the Ood" (2008) | 2008 | 2008 | |
| Steve Thompson | 3 | 3 | "The Curse of the Black Spot" (2011); "Journey to the Centre of the TARDIS" (2013); "Time Heist" (2014) (co-written with Steven Moffat) | 2011 | 2014 | |
| Donald Tosh | 0.25 | 1 | The Massacre (1966) (episode 4 only, co-written with John Lucarotti) | 1966 | 1966 | |
| Catherine Tregenna | 1 | 1 | "The Woman Who Lived" (2015) | 2015 | 2015 | |
| David Whitaker | 8 | 40 | The Edge of Destruction (1964); The Rescue (1965); The Crusade (1965); The Power of the Daleks (1966); The Evil of the Daleks (1967); The Enemy of the World (1967–68); The Wheel in Space (1968); The Ambassadors of Death (1970) | 1964 | 1970 | |
| Toby Whithouse | 6 | 7 | "School Reunion" (2006); "The Vampires of Venice" (2010); "The God Complex" (2011); "A Town Called Mercy" (2012); "Under the Lake" / "Before the Flood" (2015); "The Lie of the Land" (2017) | 2006 | 2017 | |
| Joy Wilkinson | 1 | 1 | "The Witchfinders" (2018) | 2018 | 2018 | |
| Stephen Wyatt | 2 | 8 | Paradise Towers (1987); The Greatest Show in the Galaxy (1988–89) | 1987 | 1989 | |

== Bibliography ==
- Campbell, Mark (2010). Doctor Who: The Complete Guide (2013 ed.). Constable & Robinson. ISBN 978-0-76245-240-8.

== See also ==
- List of Doctor Who script editors
- List of Doctor Who producers
- List of Torchwood writers
- List of The Sarah Jane Adventures writers
