= List of Doctor Who script editors =

The following is a list of script editors on the long-running British science fiction television programme Doctor Who. This list makes no distinction between the titles "story editor" and "script editor", as both titles were used for the same position while the production was based in London.

This list does not account for uncredited script editors, such as John Nathan-Turner, who effectively held the job for the last episode of The Trial of a Time Lord, or Craig Dickson, who was the BBC's script editor for the 1996 telemovie. Likewise, stories such as The Abominable Snowmen and Kinda, which were developed by multiple script editors, are assigned only to the person whose name appears on the credits.

== Position ==
During the original series, the script editor worked in conjunction with the series producer in developing the creative direction of the series and they held the power to commission scripts, effectively becoming second in command to the producer. However, once Doctor Who moved to BBC Wales, the title came to describe a significantly different position.

Beginning with the 2005 series, the role of the Doctor Who script editor diminished significantly, in deference to the rise of the new position of "Head Writer". In many respects, Russell T Davies and his successor Steven Moffat have proven the closest analogue to the old position, but as they are also executive producers, they have had a much greater range of responsibilities than script editors of the original series. Script editors of the new series do not have the power to commission scripts. Instead, they act as liaisons between the production staff and the screenwriter, before passing their joint work to the Head Writer for a "final polish". Moreover, script editors in the BBC Wales version are assigned not to whole seasons, but to individual episodes — or at most "blocks" of 2-4 episodes produced concurrently. Acknowledging that the Head Writer is much closer to being the script editor of the past, Helen Raynor has said that the modern Doctor Who script editor's job isn't a creative one, but "in the next seat to creativity ... a nuts and bolts job [in which] you do participate, you are a part of it, but you aren't driving it."

Since the 2011 series, the job description has changed. Lindsey Alford (see above) was credited as "Script Executive" for the 2011 run, Caroline Henry was "Script Executive" on "The Doctor, the Widow and the Wardrobe", and in 2012-13 associate producer Denise Paul took the credit of "Script Producer". John Phillips was credited as "Assistant Script Editor" for majority of Series 7 except for "Dinosaurs on a Spaceship" and "A Town Called Mercy".

For Series 11, broadcast from October 2018, Sheena Bucktowonsing was credited as Series Script Editor on each episode, alongside other production crew who were credited as Script Editor, Script Supervisor and Assistant Script Supervisor on various individual episodes.

== List of script editors ==
=== Classic era ===
| Script Editor | Tenure | | Notes |
| Script Editor | Years | Stories (Note: Stories are listed in broadcast order. Since stories were often produced out of broadcast order, some script editors can falsely appear to have non-continuous tenures) | Notes |
|---|---|---|---|
| David Whitaker | 1963–1964 | An Unearthly Child – The Dalek Invasion of Earth | Programme's first script editor, credited as story editor |
| Dennis Spooner | 1964–1965 | The Rescue – The Chase | |
| Donald Tosh | 1965–1966 | The Time Meddler – The Massacre of St Bartholomew's Eve ep. 3 | |
| Gerry Davis | 1966–1967 | The Massacre of St Bartholomew's Eve ep. 4 – The Evil of the Daleks ep. 3 | |
| Peter Bryant | 1967–1968 | The Evil of the Daleks ep. 4–7, The Abominable Snowmen – The Enemy of the World | |
| Victor Pemberton | 1967 | The Tomb of the Cybermen | Temporary assignment |
| Derrick Sherwin | 1968 | The Web of Fear – The Mind Robber, The Space Pirates | |
| Terrance Dicks | 1968–1974 | The Invasion – The Seeds of Death, The War Games – Planet of the Spiders | Longest tenure as script editor |
| Robert Holmes | 1974–1977 | Robot – Image of the Fendahl | Had started unofficial work in the post on Death to the Daleks |
| Anthony Read | 1977–1979 | The Sun Makers – The Armageddon Factor | Started working (uncredited) on Image of the Fendahl, after it was commissioned by Robert Holmes |
| Douglas Adams | 1979–1980 | Destiny of the Daleks – Shada | |
| Christopher H. Bidmead | 1980–1981 | The Leisure Hive – Logopolis | |
| Antony Root | 1981–1982 | Four to Doomsday, The Visitation and Earthshock | Temporary assignment Script editor in name only for Earthshock, due to BBC rules preventing Eric Saward being writer and script editor on the same story |
| Eric Saward | 1982–1986 | Castrovalva, Kinda, Black Orchid, Time-Flight – The Trial of a Time Lord: Mindwarp, The Trial of a Time Lord: The Ultimate Foe ep. 1 | Resigned from post prior to the completion of The Trial of a Time Lord |
| Andrew Cartmel | 1987–1989 | Time and the Rani – Survival | Last script editor for the original series |

=== Revived era ===
| Script Editor | Tenure | | Notes |
| Script Editor | Years | Stories | Notes |
|---|---|---|---|
| Elwen Rowlands | 2005 | "Rose" – "The End of the World", "Aliens of London" – "World War Three", "The Long Game" – "Father's Day", "Boom Town" | First female script editor, along with Raynor. Both were the first script editors of the new series, hired simultaneously. |
| Helen Raynor | 2005–2008 | "The Unquiet Dead", "Dalek", "The Empty Child" – "The Doctor Dances", "Bad Wolf" – "The Christmas Invasion", "School Reunion" – "The Age of Steel", "Army of Ghosts" – "Doomsday", "Blink", "Silence in the Library" – "Midnight" | See above note. Only script editor with credits in each of the first four series. Only person to script edit for Steven Moffat while he wasn't the head writer. Also Torchwood's script editor. |
| Simon Winstone | 2006–2007 | "New Earth" – "Tooth and Claw", "The Idiot's Lantern" – "Fear Her", "The Runaway Bride" – "Gridlock", "The Lazarus Experiment" – "42", "Utopia" – "Last of the Time Lords" | As a former editor of the Virgin Missing Adventures, Winstone was the first script editor of the BBC Wales era to have had previous experience with Doctor Who fiction. He was also the first script editor to appear on Doctor Who Confidential, debuting in episode 10 of series 2. He also script-edited the first episode of The Sarah Jane Adventures entitled "Invasion of the Bane" in 2007. |
| Lindsey Alford | 2007–2010 | "Daleks in Manhattan" – "Evolution of the Daleks", "Human Nature" – "The Family of Blood", "Partners in Crime", "Planet of the Ood", "The Doctor's Daughter" – "The Unicorn and the Wasp", "The Stolen Earth" – "Planet of the Dead", "The Eleventh Hour", "The Time of Angels" – "Flesh and Stone", "The Hungry Earth" – "Cold Blood", "The Lodger" – "The Big Bang" | Also script editor for The Sarah Jane Adventures (Series 1, 10 episodes) |
| Brian Minchin | 2007–2010 | "Time Crash", "Voyage of the Damned", "The Fires of Pompeii", "Turn Left", "The Beast Below" – "Victory of the Daleks", "The Vampires of Venice" – "Amy's Choice", "Vincent and the Doctor" | Also Torchwood's script editor and producer of "From Raxacoricofallapatorius with Love". Producer of The Sarah Jane Adventures series 4-5, later Executive Producer of Doctor Who (2013-2017) |
| Nikki Smith | 2008 | "The Sontaran Stratagem" – "The Poison Sky" | Also producer of The Sarah Jane Adventures and Doctor Who |
| Gary Russell | 2009 | "The Waters of Mars" – "The End of Time" | Also script editor on The Sarah Jane Adventures on all episodes from 2008-2011; and script editor for four episodes of Torchwood ("Dead Man Walking", "A Day in the Death", "Something Borrowed" and "Fragments") |
| Emma Freud | 2010 | "Vincent and the Doctor" | |
| Caroline Henry | 2011 | "The Impossible Astronaut" – "Day of the Moon", "The Curse of the Black Spot", "The Rebel Flesh" – "The Almost People", "Let's Kill Hitler", "The Girl Who Waited", "The Wedding of River Song" | |
| John Phillips | 2013 | "The Name of the Doctor" | |
| Richard Cookson | 2013–2014 | "The Day of the Doctor", "Robot of Sherwood", "Time Heist", "Flatline" | |
| Derek Ritchie | 2013–2014 | "The Time of the Doctor" – "Into the Dalek", "The Caretaker" | |
| David P Davis | 2014–2015 | "Robot of Sherwood" – "The Witch's Familiar", "The Zygon Invasion" – "Face the Raven", "The Husbands of River Song" | |
| Nick Lambon | 2015–2017 | "Under the Lake" – "The Woman Who Lived", "Heaven Sent" – "Hell Bent","The Return of Doctor Mysterio" – "Oxygen", "The Lie of the Land" – "Twice Upon A Time" | |
| Emma Genders | 2017 | "Extremis" – "The Pyramid at the End of the World" | |
| Nina Métivier | 2018 | "The Woman Who Fell To Earth", "It Takes You Away" | |
| Fiona McAllister | 2018–2021 | "The Ghost Monument" – "The Witchfinders", "The Battle of Ranskoor Av Kolos" – "Revolution of the Daleks" | |
| Caroline Buckley | 2021–2022 | "The Halloween Apocalypse" – "The Power of the Doctor" | |
| Rebecca Roughan | 2021–2022 | "The Halloween Apocalypse" – "The Power of the Doctor" | |
| Scott Handcock | 2023–2024 | "The Star Beast" – "Empire of Death" | |
| David Cheung | 2024–present | "Joy to the World" – present | |

== See also ==
- List of Doctor Who producers
- List of Doctor Who writers
