= List of Doctor Who producers =

This is a series of lists of those who have received a producer credit (executive, associate, etc.) on the long-running British science fiction television programme Doctor Who. The definition of producer has changed over the years, as has the nature of television production. Therefore, the list is just of those receiving a producer credit on-screen and not those who have effectively fulfilled producers' roles for the show, such as Terrance Dicks' brief tenure as producer before the arrival of Barry Letts, and a brief spell by David Maloney in 1978 when Graham Williams was incapacitated. It also excludes those who have produced Doctor Who outside the regular series only, such as animated or charity episodes, and in other media, such as the audio dramas from Big Finish Productions.

== Producer credits ==
Producer	Tenure			Notes
Producer	Years	Episodes	№	Notes
Classic series
Verity Lambert	1963–1965	An Unearthly Child – "Mission to the Unknown"	86	Programme's first producer
John Wiles	1965–1966	The Myth Makers – The Ark	24	
Innes Lloyd	1966–1968	The Celestial Toymaker – The Evil of the Daleks; The Abominable Snowmen – The Enemy of the World	77	
Peter Bryant	1967–1969	The Tomb of the Cybermen; The Web of Fear – The Space Pirates	56	Former story editor
Derrick Sherwin	1969–1970	The War Games – Spearhead from Space	14	Former story editor and writer of The Invasion
Barry Letts	1970–1975	Doctor Who and the Silurians – Robot	128	Director and writer (often uncredited) of several serials; First producer to simultaneously serve as director; Later executive producer from 1980–1981
Philip Hinchcliffe	1975–1977	The Ark in Space – The Talons of Weng Chiang	70	
Graham Williams	1977–1980	Horror of Fang Rock – The Horns of Nimon	72	Co-writer of The Invasion of Time and City of Death (as "David Agnew"); Also produced the incomplete serial Shada (6 episodes, 1980)
John Nathan-Turner	1980–1989	The Leisure Hive – Survival	170	Served the longest tenure as producer; Former unit production manager; Also produced Dimensions in Time
TV film
Peter V. Ware	1996	Doctor Who	1	One-off producer for sole television movie
Revived series
Phil Collinson	2005–2008	"Rose" – "42"; "Blink" – "The Fires of Pompeii"; "The Doctor's Daughter"; "Silence in the Library" – "Midnight"; "The Stolen Earth" – "Journey's End"	48	First producer of the revived series; Also executive producer from 2007–2008, 2023–2025; Executive producer, The Sarah Jane Adventures (11 episodes, 2007)
Susie Liggat	2007–2008	"Human Nature" – "The Family of Blood"; "Planet of the Ood" – "The Poison Sky"; "The Unicorn and the Wasp"; "Turn Left"; "The Next Doctor"	8	Holiday relief for Collinson in 2007; First female producer since Verity Lambert; Producer, The Sarah Jane Adventures (1 episode, 2007)
Tracie Simpson	2009–2010	"Planet of the Dead"; "The End of Time" – "The Eleventh Hour"; "The Time of Angels" – "Amy's Choice"; "Vincent and the Doctor" – "The Lodger"	10	Also line producer from 2014–2015; Production executive (2016–2022)
Nikki Wilson	2009, 2014–2017	"The Waters of Mars"; "Deep Breath" – "Robot of Sherwood"; "The Caretaker"; "Flatline"; "Sleep No More"; "Face the Raven"; "The Husbands of River Song"; "Thin Ice" – "Oxygen"; "The Lie of the Land" – "Empress of Mars"	14	Also series producer from 2018–2020, co-executive producer from 2021–2022; Script editor (2 episodes, 2008); Producer, The Sarah Jane Adventures (16 episodes, 2008–2009); Executive producer, The Sarah Jane Adventures (18 episodes, 2010–2011)
Peter Bennett	2010, 2014–2017	"The Beast Below" – "Victory of the Daleks"; "The Hungry Earth" – "Cold Blood"; "The Pandorica Opens" – "The Big Bang"; "Listen" – "Time Heist"; "Kill the Moon" – "Mummy on the Orient Express"; "Dark Water" – "Death in Heaven"; "The Magician's Apprentice" – "The Witch's Familiar"; "The Zygon Invasion" – "The Zygon Inversion"; "Heaven Sent" – "Hell Bent"; "The Return of Doctor Mysterio"; "The Pilot" – "Smile"; "Extremis" – "The Pyramid at the End of the World"; "World Enough and Time" – "The Doctor Falls"; "Twice Upon a Time"	26	First assistant director; Producer, Torchwood: Children of Earth (5 episodes, 2009)
Patrick Schweitzer	2010	"The Vampires of Venice"; "Vincent and the Doctor"	2	Produced with Tracie Simpson due to overseas filming demands; Also line producer and former location manager
Sanne Wohlenberg	2010–2011	"A Christmas Carol"; "The Doctor's Wife"; "Night Terrors"	3	
Marcus Wilson	2011–2013	"The Impossible Astronaut" – "The Curse of the Black Spot"; "The Rebel Flesh" – "Let's Kill Hitler"; "The Girl Who Waited" - "The God Complex"; "The Wedding of River Song" – "The Snowmen"; "Cold War" – "The Crimson Horror"; "The Day of the Doctor"; "The Time of the Doctor"	25	Also series producer from 2012–2013
Denise Paul	2011–2013	"Closing Time"; "The Bells of Saint John" – "The Rings of Akhaten"; "Nightmare in Silver" – "The Name of the Doctor"	5	Also associate producer from 2011–2013, script producer from 2012–2013
Paul Frift	2014	"In the Forest of the Night"; "Last Christmas"	2	
Derek Ritchie	2015	"Under the Lake" – "The Woman Who Lived"	4	Script editor (4 episodes, 2013–2014)
Alex Mercer	2018–2021	"Arachnids in the UK"; "Demons of the Punjab"; "The Witchfinders"; "The Battle of Ranskoor Av Kolos"; "Spyfall, Part 2" – "Orphan 55"; "Can You Hear Me?" – "The Haunting of Villa Diodati"; "Revolution of the Daleks"	9	
Pete Levy	2021	"Once, Upon Time"; "Survivors of the Flux" – "The Vanquishers"	3	Also COVID Manager for "The Halloween Apocalypse"
Sheena Bucktowonsing	2022	"Eve of the Daleks"	1	Series script editor (2018–2021); Also associate producer from 2021–2022
Vicki Delow	2023–2025	"The Star Beast" – "The Giggle"; "Space Babies"; "Boom" – "Dot and Bubble"; "The Legend of Ruby Sunday" / "Empire of Death"; "The Robot Revolution"; "Lucky Day" – "The Interstellar Song Contest"	13	Also series producer from 2023–2025
Chris May	2023–2025	"The Church on Ruby Road"; "The Devil's Chord"; "Rogue"; "Lux" – "The Well"; "Wish World" / "The Reality War"	7	
Alison Sterling	2024	"Joy to the World"	1	

=== Series producer ===
Producers are credited as "series producers" on some episodes when others fulfil producing duties.

Series producer	Tenure			Notes
Series producer	Years	Episodes	№	Notes
Marcus Wilson	2011–2013	"Closing Time"; "The Bells of Saint John"; "The Rings of Akhaten"; "Nightmare in Silver"; "The Name of the Doctor"	5	Also producer from 2011–2013
Nikki Wilson	2018–2022	"The Woman Who Fell to Earth" – "Rosa"; "The Tsuranga Conundrum"; "Kerblam!"; "It Takes You Away"; "Resolution"; "Spyfall, Part 1"; "Nikola Tesla's Night of Terror" – "Praxeus"; "Ascension of the Cybermen" / "The Timeless Children"	13	Also producer in 2009 and from 2014–2017, co-executive producer from 2021–2022
Vicki Delow	2023–2025	"The Church on Ruby Road"; "The Devil's Chord"; "Rogue"; "Joy to the World"; "Lux" – "The Well"; "Wish World" / "The Reality War"	8	Also producer from 2023–2025

=== Co-producer ===
Co-producer	Tenure			Notes
Co-producer	Years	Episodes	№	Notes
TV film
Matthew Jacobs	1996	Doctor Who	1	First co-producer; Also wrote the TV movie (1996)
Revived series
Ellen Marsh	2023–2024	"The Star Beast" – "Empire of Death"	11	First co-producer of revived series
Jessica Gardner	2024–2025	"Joy to the World"; "Lux" – "The Well"; "Wish World" / "The Reality War"	5	
Sharon King	2025	"The Robot Revolution"; "Lucky Day" – "The Interstellar Song Contest"	4	

=== Line producer ===
Line producer	Tenure			Notes
Line producer	Years	Episodes	№	Notes
Patrick Schweitzer	2010	"The Eleventh Hour" – "The Big Bang"	13	First line producer; Also producer in 2010; Production manager (6 episodes, 2007); Location manager (1 episode, 2006)
Diana Barton	2010–2013	"A Christmas Carol" – "The Angels Take Manhattan"; "Hide"; "The Crimson Horror"	22	
David Mason	2011–2012	"The Impossible Astronaut" – "Day of the Moon"; "The Angels Take Manhattan"	3	US location filming
Des Hughes	2012–2013	"The Snowmen" – "The Rings of Akhaten"; "Journey to the Centre of the TARDIS"; "Nightmare in Silver" – "The Time of the Doctor"	8	
Phillipa Cole	2013	"Cold War"	1	
Tracie Simpson	2014–2015	"Deep Breath" – "The Husbands of River Song	26	Also producer from 2009–2010; Production executive (2016–2022)
Steffan Morris	2016–2022	"The Return of Doctor Mysterio" – "The Power of the Doctor"	45	Formerly second assistant director (2005–2007), production manager (2009–2015), and first assistant director (2011); Production executive (2023–2025)
Mark Devlin	2023–2024	"The Star Beast" – "Empire of Death"	11	
Angela Phillips	2024–2025	"Joy To The World" – "The Reality War"	9	

=== Script producer ===
Script producer	Tenure			Notes
Script producer	Years	Episodes	№	Notes
Denise Paul	2012–2013	"Asylum of the Daleks"; "A Town Called Mercy" – "The Snowmen"; "Hide"	6	Also producer and associate producer from 2011–2013

=== Associate producer ===
Associate producer	Tenure			Notes
Associate producer	Years	Episodes	№	Notes
Classic series
Mervyn Pinfield	1963–1964	An Unearthly Child – The Romans	57	Programme's first associate producer; Also director
Peter Bryant	1967	The Faceless Ones – The Evil of the Daleks episode 3	9	Last associate producer of the original series
Revived series
Helen Vallis	2005–2006	"Rose" – "The Age of Steel"	20	First associate producer of the revived series
Catrin Lewis Defis	2008–2010	"The Next Doctor"; "The End of Time"	5	Producer, "Music of the Spheres" (BBC Proms mini-episode, 2008); Associate producer and production manager on Torchwood
Debbi Slater	2009	"Planet of the Dead" – "The Waters of Mars"	2	Production manager on Doctor Who, Torchwood, and The Sarah Jane Adventures
Denise Paul	2011–2012	"The Impossible Astronaut" – "The Curse of the Black Spot"; "The Rebel Flesh" – "Let's Kill Hitler"; "The Girl Who Waited" – "The God Complex"; "The Wedding of River Song" – "The Doctor, the Widow and the Wardrobe"; "Dinosaurs on a Spaceship"	12	Also producer from 2011–2013, script producer from 2012–2013
Sheena Bucktowonsing	2021–2022	"The Halloween Apocalypse" – "The Vanquishers"; "Legend of the Sea Devils" – "The Power of the Doctor"	8	Series script editor (2018–2021); Also producer in 2022

== Executive producer credits ==
Executive producer	Tenure			Notes
Executive producer	Years	Episodes	№	Notes
Classic series
Barry Letts	1980–1981	The Leisure Hive – Logopolis	28	Programme's first executive producer; Previously producer from 1970–1975
TV film
Alex Beaton	1996	Doctor Who	1	Represented Universal Pictures
Philip Segal	1996	Doctor Who	1	Served as the main executive producer
Revived series
Russell T Davies	2005–2010, 2023–2025	"Rose" – "The End of Time"; "The Star Beast" – "The Reality War"	81	First (2005–2010) and fourth (2023–2025) showrunner / head writer; Creator and executive producer, Torchwood, The Sarah Jane Adventures, and The War Between the Land and the Sea
Julie Gardner	2005–2010, 2023–2025	"Rose" – "The End of Time"; "The Star Beast" – "The Reality War"	81	Executive producer, Torchwood (2006–2011), "The Sarah Jane Adventures" (2007–2009), and The War Between the Land and the Sea (2025); Co-founder of Bad Wolf
Mal Young	2005	"Rose" – "The Parting of the Ways"	13	
Phil Collinson	2007–2008, 2023–2025	"Human Nature" / "The Family of Blood"; "Planet of the Ood" – "The Poison Sky"; "The Unicorn and the Wasp"; "Turn Left"; "The Star Beast" – "The Reality War"	28	Regular producer from 2005–2008; served as executive producer when production was covered by Susie Liggat
Steven Moffat	2010–2017, 2024	"The Eleventh Hour" – "Twice Upon a Time"; "Boom"; "Joy to the World"	86	Second showrunner / head writer (2010–2017); Executive producer, An Adventure in Space and Time (2013); Executive producer, Class (8 episodes, 2016)
Piers Wenger	2010–2011	"The Eleventh Hour" – "The Doctor, the Widow and the Wardrobe"	28	Executive producer, The Sarah Jane Adventures (12 episodes, 2009)
Beth Willis	2010–2011	"The Eleventh Hour" – "The Wedding of River Song"	27	Joined the team as part of a remit to work alongside Wenger on a range of BBC Wales dramas
Caroline Skinner	2011–2013	"The Doctor, the Widow and the Wardrobe" – "The Name of the Doctor"	15	Executive producer, An Adventure in Space and Time (2013)
Faith Penhale	2013	"The Day of the Doctor"	1	
Brian Minchin	2013–2017	"The Time of the Doctor" – "Twice Upon a Time"	41	Script editor (8 episodes, 2007–2010); Script editor, Torchwood (20 episodes, 2006–2008); Associate producer, Torchwood (5 episodes, 2009); Producer, The Sarah Jane Adventures (18 episodes, 2010–2011) and Torchwood (6 episodes, 2011); Executive producer, Class (8 episodes, 2016)
Chris Chibnall	2018–2022	"The Woman Who Fell to Earth" – "The Power of the Doctor"	31	Third showrunner / head writer (2018–2022); Head writer of Torchwood (2008)
Matt Strevens	2018–2022	"The Woman Who Fell to Earth" – "The Power of the Doctor"	31	Producer, An Adventure in Space and Time (2013)
Jane Tranter	2023–2025	"The Star Beast" – "The Reality War"	21	Former BBC Head of Drama; Co-founder of Bad Wolf; Executive producer, The War Between the Land and the Sea (2025)
Joel Collins	2023–2025	"The Star Beast" – "The Reality War"	21	Executive producer, The War Between the Land and the Sea (2025)
Julie Anne Robinson	2024	"Space Babies"; "Boom"	2	Also director of episodes

=== Executive producer for the BBC ===
Executive producer	Tenure			Notes
Executive producer	Years	Episodes	№	Notes
TV film
Jo Wright	1996	Doctor Who	1	First executive producer for the BBC
Revived series
Ben Irving	2018–2022	"The Ghost Monument" – "The Power of the Doctor"	30	
Rebecca Ferguson	2023–2024	"The Star Beast" – "Empire Of Death"	11	
Nick Lambon	2024–2025	"Joy to the World" – "The Reality War"	9	

=== Co-executive producer ===
Co-executive producer	Tenure			Notes
Co-executive producer	Years	Episodes	№	Notes
Sam Hoyle	2018–2019	"The Woman Who Fell to Earth" – "Resolution"	11	Co-executive producer alongside Chris Chibnall and Matt Strevens
Nikki Wilson	2021–2022	"The Halloween Apocalypse" – "The Power of the Doctor"	9	Co-executive producer alongside Chris Chibnall and Matt Strevens

== Showrunner / head writer ==
Showrunner	Tenure			Notes
Showrunner	Years	Episodes	№	Notes
Russell T Davies	2005–2010	"Rose" – "The End of Time"	60 (wrote 31)	Also executive producer
Russell T Davies	2023–2025	"The Star Beast" – "The Reality War"	21 (wrote 15)	Also executive producer
Steven Moffat	2010–2017	"The Eleventh Hour" – "Twice Upon a Time"	84 (wrote 42)	Also executive producer
Chris Chibnall	2018–2022	"The Woman Who Fell to Earth" – "The Power of the Doctor"	31 (wrote 24)	Also executive producer

== See also ==
- List of Doctor Who script editors
