= The Pyramid at the End of the World =

271 – "The Pyramid at the End of the World"
- Doctor Who episode

Cast
- Doctor: Peter Capaldi – Twelfth Doctor
- Companions: Pearl Mackie – Bill Potts; Matt Lucas – Nardole
- Others: Togo Igawa – UN Secretary General; Nigel Hastings – The Commander; Eben Young – Colonel Don Brabbit; Rachel Denning – Erica; Tony Gardner – Douglas; Andrew Bryon – Colonel Ilya; Daphne Cheung – General Xiaolian; Jamie Hill – Monks; Tim Bentinck – Voice of the Monks; Ronkẹ Adékoluẹjo – Penny (uncredited)

Production
- Directed by: Daniel Nettheim
- Written by: Peter Harness and Steven Moffat
- Produced by: Peter Bennett
- Executive producers: Steven Moffat; Brian Minchin
- Music by: Murray Gold
- Series: Series 10
- Running time: 46 minutes
- First broadcast: 27 May 2017

Chronology
← Preceded by "Extremis"	Followed by → "The Lie of the Land"

"The Pyramid at the End of the World" is the seventh episode of the tenth series of the British science fiction television series Doctor Who. It was written by Peter Harness and Steven Moffat and broadcast on 27 May 2017 on BBC One. "The Pyramid at the End of the World" received generally positive reviews from television critics.

The Doctor (Peter Capaldi) investigates how a pyramid appeared in Turmezistan overnight and confronts an ancient enemy ready to destroy humanity. It is the second of three connected episodes known as "The Monks Trilogy".

== Plot ==
A five-thousand year old pyramid appears overnight in a disputed area of Turmezistan between American, Russian, and Chinese forces. The Secretary-General of the United Nations recruits the Twelfth Doctor, as President of Earth, to help. The Doctor is still blind ("Oxygen"), a secret he is keeping from Bill.

The Monks who occupy the pyramid cause every clock in the world to display a time counting down to midnight in the manner of the Doomsday Clock. The Doctor has the military leaders use coordinated attacks on the Monks, as a show of strength, but the Monks easily deflect them. The Doctor, Bill, and Nardole soon join the leaders as they negotiate with the Monks. Using the computer running their simulations ("Extremis"), the Monks show that the Earth will become lifeless within a year. They offer humanity their help to stop a pending cataclysmic disaster, but only if they "consent". The Doctor warns that this consent would have unknown but everlasting consequences. The Secretary-General offers his consent, but the Monks disintegrate him, saying he gave it out of fear, not "love".

The Doctor realises the Monks are misdirecting them to believe a military disaster is imminent, and instead suspects the threat is biological. He and Nardole find several laboratories performing bacterial work and briefly override their internal camera systems to determine which one the Monks are watching. Bill stays behind as the Doctor and Nardole travel in the TARDIS to the lab.

Through a series of inconsequential events, two scientists have accidentally created a super-bacterium capable of breaking down all living organisms, and it is about to be vented into the atmosphere. The TARDIS arrives, but the Doctor sends Nardole back for his safety, unaware that he has been contaminated. Inside the TARDIS, Nardole collapses unconscious. Meanwhile, Bill, in communication with the Doctor, joins the military leaders as they offer to surrender. The Monks still disintegrate them, considering it a strategic move. The Doctor, with the help of Erica, one of the scientists, crafts a makeshift bomb to sterilise the bacteria and destroy the lab. However, he becomes trapped inside, unable to see a combination lock to free himself, use his sonic screwdriver on it, or get Nardole's assistance. He is forced to admit to Bill he is blind.

Bill, representing the Doctor's authority, offers her consent to the Monks, insisting they restore the Doctor's sight. The Monks accept, as this consent came from her love for the Doctor. The Doctor regains his vision and escapes the lab, while the Monks assert their control of Earth.

=== Continuity ===
The Doctor resumes the title of "President of the World", given to him in the episode "Death in Heaven", to be called upon in times of worldwide crisis. The fictional country of Turmezistan was previously introduced in "The Zygon Invasion" which was also written by The Pyramid at the End of the World co-writer Peter Harness and both episodes were directed by Daniel Nettheim.

=== Outside references ===
The Doctor compares the Monks' countdown to the real Doomsday Clock and includes a bit of the history behind its rationale. The three military commanders all agree to set aside hostilities and "give peace a chance", a reference to the Plastic Ono Band song. The Doctor, in congratulating Erica, calls out "By George, she’s got it!", a line from the musical My Fair Lady.

== Production ==
Harness originally wanted the human delegation to consist of Korean, American, and British leaders who were thinly veiled versions of Kim Jong-un, Donald Trump, and Jeremy Corbyn, but had to change them to three generic military personnel when this was not permitted.

Filming for "The Pyramid at the End of the World", as well as the previous episode "Extremis", took place from 23 November 2016 to 17 January 2017.

== Broadcast and reception ==
The episode was watched by 4.01 million overnight. The episode received 5.79 million views overall, and it received an Appreciation Index of 82.

=== Critical reception ===
Professional ratings
Aggregate scores
Source	Rating
Rotten Tomatoes (Tomatometer)	87%
Rotten Tomatoes (Average Score)	7.8/10
Review scores
Source	Rating
The A.V. Club	B
Entertainment Weekly	B+
SFX Magazine	4/5 stars
TV Fanatic	3.5/5 stars
IndieWire	B−
IGN	8/10
New York Magazine	5/5 stars
Radio Times	4/5 stars
Daily Mirror	4/5 stars

"The Pyramid at the End of the World" received generally positive reviews from television critics. On Rotten Tomatoes, the episode has 15 reviews, 87% of which are positive. The website's consensus states, "'The Pyramid at the End of the World' manages to fill the middle gap of a three-episode arc with thoughtful monologues and needed cliffhanger."

Alasdair Wilkins of The A.V. Club gave the episode a B rating, feeling that the events of the episode itself were mediocre, describing it as "mostly just unobjectionably decent", and how many of the characters in the episode had been memorable or as compelling as the other one-off characters that had featured in the series. However, he went on to praise the ending of the episode and how it saved the episode itself, finding the similarities with the second part of the Tenth Doctor serial "The End of Time" and how the Doctor managed to save the world, but at a cost. Wilkins commented on the unexpected ending, stating that it was "probably what I'm going to remember from 'The Pyramid At The End Of The World,' especially when thinking of it as the middle entry between the brilliant 'Extremis' and the seriously intriguing-looking 'The Lie Of The Land.'"

Kathleen Wiedel of TV Fanatic gave the episode a 3.5 out of 5 star rating, noting the ambiguous nature of some parts of the episode, and the issues concerning certain elements, such as the promotion of the Doctor to "President of Earth" and how this was mostly ignored, and how the necessity for "consent" from the Monks was not explained. She went on to praise the number of continuity references in the episode, and Rachel Denning's role as the scientist Erica.

Ross Ruediger of New York magazine gave the episode a perfect score of 5 out of 5 stars, complimenting the work and scripts of Peter Harness yet again and his repeated themes of "monumental life and death decisions for humankind", and also director Daniel Nettheim and how he "took two great scripts and made utterly compelling yet very different end products out of each". Ruediger also commented on how "politically charged" the episode was. He also commented on his reservations about how the initial references to terrorism had been removed from the episode due to the Manchester Arena bombing, and while it was "understandable", he stated how the sequence posed questions that were relevant to the story.

Patrick Mulkern of Radio Times gave the episode a rating of 4 out of 5 stars, describing it as "a peculiar blend of the deadly serious and hilariously hokum". He stated that the best part of the episode was the story line of the two researchers and the slow reveal towards deadly disease as the climax of the episode, and how it was reminiscent of Terry Nation's 1970s serial Survivors.
