= Extremis (Doctor Who) =

270 – "Extremis"
- Doctor Who episode

Cast
- Doctor: Peter Capaldi – Twelfth Doctor
- Companions: Pearl Mackie – Bill Potts; Matt Lucas – Nardole
- Others: Michelle Gomez – Missy; Jennifer Hennessy – Moira; Corrado Invernizzi – Cardinal Angelo; Joseph Long – The Pope; Ronkẹ Adékoluẹjo – Penny; Ivanno Jeremiah – Rafando; Francesco Martino – Piero; Alana Maria – Pentagon Woman; Laurent Maurel – Nicolas; Jamie Hill – Monk; Tim Bentinck – Voice of the Monks

Production
- Directed by: Daniel Nettheim
- Written by: Steven Moffat
- Produced by: Peter Bennett
- Executive producers: Steven Moffat; Brian Minchin
- Music by: Murray Gold
- Series: Series 10
- Running time: 49 minutes
- First broadcast: 20 May 2017

Chronology
← Preceded by "Oxygen"	Followed by → "The Pyramid at the End of the World"

"Extremis" is the sixth episode of the tenth series of the British science fiction television series Doctor Who. It was written by Steven Moffat and broadcast on 20 May 2017 on BBC One. "Extremis" received very positive reviews from television critics, with many praising Peter Capaldi's performance and Steven Moffat's script, though some commented on the complexity of the script.

The Vatican calls upon the Doctor (Peter Capaldi) to investigate the Veritas, a book whose readers typically kill themselves after reading it. When the Veritas is translated and leaked online, the Doctor must uncover the dark secret that the book holds. It is the first of three connected episodes known as "The Monks Trilogy".

== Plot ==
Flashbacks reveal that the Twelfth Doctor was charged to execute Missy, but with some urging from Nardole spared her life. Nevertheless, he is charged with guarding her within a Vault for a thousand years.

In the present, the Doctor remains blind following the events of "Oxygen" and wears his sonic sunglasses to provide a limited form of sight while hiding his condition from everyone other than Nardole. He receives an email entitled Extremis that he views through his glasses.

The Doctor is met by the Pope to help deal with a recently translated text called the Veritas, that causes readers to end their own lives. The Doctor takes Bill and Nardole to a secret library inside the Vatican. They find that a translation of the Veritas has been emailed to CERN. Bill and Nardole discover a portal leading to a hub of other portals, linked to CERN and the White House, among other places. Meanwhile, the Doctor temporarily regains his sight using Time Lord technology and tries to read Veritas, but is forced to flee into a second portal with the translation when the skeletal, corpse-like Monks appear.

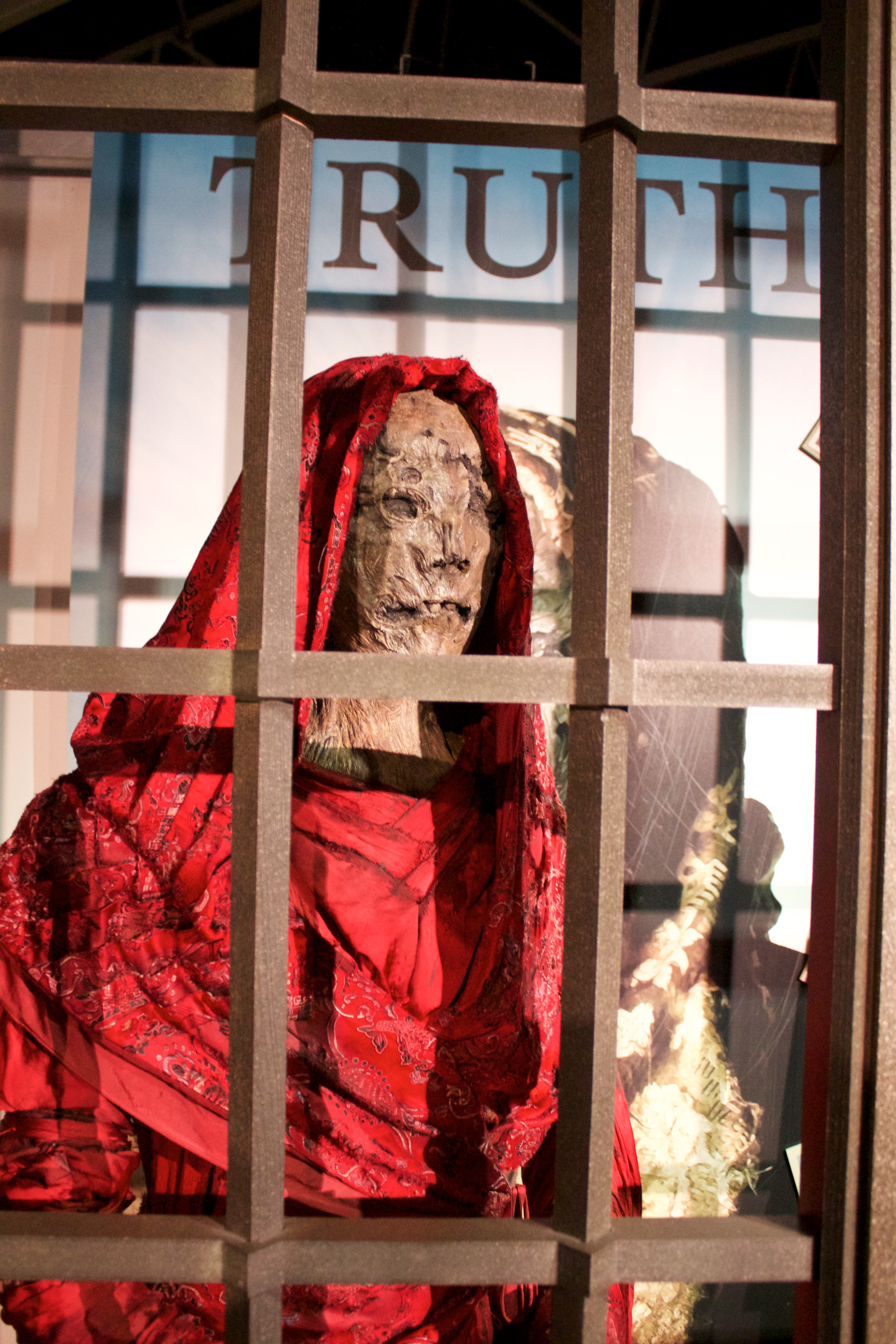
A Monk, on display at a Doctor Who exhibition

Bill and Nardole enter the portal to CERN, finding all the scientists are prepared to kill themselves. A scientist demonstrates that every time he asks them for a random number, all of them say the same one. The two flee back to the hub. Nardole realises the portals are actually computer projections, and when he steps out of the projections, he disappears. A distraught Bill follows a trail of blood through a portal, finding herself in the Oval Office of the White House, where the Doctor is waiting. The Doctor explains that Veritas describes a "demon" planning to invade Earth by creating detailed simulations of it to practice invasion. Simulacra within these "shadow worlds" can discover the false reality as they can only come up with pseudo-random numbers, leading them to commit suicide to escape the simulation. He reveals that everyone is simply simulacra within a simulation. A Monk appears, and Bill disintegrates the same way Nardole did. The Doctor tells the alien that the Earth will be ready as he has been recording everything through his sonic glasses and emails the recording, titled Extremis, to his real-world self.

The real Doctor finishes Extremis, and tells Missy through the Vault doors that he may need her help.

=== Continuity ===
The episode makes multiple references to River Song, and the grief felt by the Doctor following his final encounter with her in "The Husbands of River Song" (2015). It is revealed that River ordered Nardole to follow the Doctor to ensure he acts virtuously. River Song's TARDIS-styled diary, first seen in the Tenth Doctor story "Silence in the Library"/"Forest of the Dead" (2008), is also featured in the episode.

=== Outside references ===
Upon entering the Vatican's secret library, Bill utters "Harry Potter", for which the Doctor scolds her. He later refers disparagingly to the lengthiness of Moby-Dick, saying: "Honestly, shut up and get to the whale!"

The lead scientist from CERN tells Bill and Nardole "We will all go together when we go," which is an apocalyptic-themed song by Tom Lehrer and the final track on the LP An Evening Wasted with Tom Lehrer.

Nardole compares the simulated worlds to the holodecks of Star Trek and the video game world of Grand Theft Auto, while the Doctor draws a comparison to Super Mario.

== Production ==
Filming for "Extremis", as well as the following episode "The Pyramid at the End of the World", took place from 23 November 2016 to 17 January 2017.

=== Cast notes ===
Joseph Long, who plays the Pope in this episode, previously appeared as Rocco Colasanto in the series 4 episode "Turn Left". Tim Bentinck had previously played numerous roles in various Doctor Who audio productions.

== Broadcast and reception ==
The episode was watched by 4.16 million overnight. The episode received 5.53 million views overall, and it received an Appreciation Index score of 82.

=== Critical reception ===
Professional ratings
Aggregate scores
Source	Rating
Rotten Tomatoes (Average Score)	8.7/10
Rotten Tomatoes (Tomatometer)	93%
Review scores
Source	Rating
The A.V. Club	A
Entertainment Weekly	B+
GamesRadar	5/5 stars
TV Fanatic	4.3/5 stars
IGN	8.6
New York Magazine	5/5 stars
Radio Times	5/5 stars
Daily Mirror	3/5 stars

"Extremis" received very positive reviews from critics, with many praising Capaldi's performance and Moffat's script, while calling the episode's story "unique" and "ambitious", though a few found the story complicated. On Rotten Tomatoes, 93% of 14 reviews are positive, with the site's consensus reading "'Extremis' expertly juggles several of Doctor Who's more thought-provoking themes, enlivened by a sharp-witted script and a fast-paced plot."

Alasdair Wilkins of The A.V. Club awarded an A to "Extremis", noting that the creativity and experimental aspect of the writing showcased Steven Moffat at his best. He compared the story's quality to some of Moffat's previous stories, such as "Listen" and "Heaven Sent", stating that the episode was an experimental success and that "the result is unlike anything else you're likely to find on television, and certainly unlike anything else Doctor Who has done before." Wilkins also went on to praise Capaldi's acting in the episode, and how the character of the Doctor relates to Bill when making the revelation of the episode.

Zoe Delahunty-Light of GamesRadar awarded a perfect score of 5 stars to the episode, asserting that "Doctor Who doesn't get better than this". She complimented how the episode played with complicated themes in a sophisticated manner, commenting on how the idea of a simulated world has been done before, but how Doctor Who took it further. She also commended Michelle Gomez's portrayal of Missy, and how the character "is a far more complicated regeneration of the Master than we realised".

Scott Collura of IGN gave "Extremis" a rating of 8.6 out of 10, saying the timing of the episode within the series was perfect to elaborate on the secret of the vault, while also following a larger and more complex story. He also stated that the return of Michelle Gomez as Missy was long overdue and of a particular note to the episode.

Patrick Mulkern of Radio Times also awarded a perfect score of 5 out of 5 stars to the episode. The scenes with Missy were praised by him as "a gift for Michelle Gomez, a scene stealer", and the dynamic between the Doctor and Missy was also highlighted for being played with. The Monks were credited for being "bloody hideous", and were also compared to Moffat's previous creations such as the Silence for their worldwide silent invasion. They rounded up by labeling the episode "confident, breath-taking television from Steven Moffat".

In contrast to the positive reviews, Daniel Jackson of the Daily Mirror felt that the problem with the episode wasn't the episode itself, but having to stop and think about the episode afterwards. He criticised the number of unnecessary twists in the episode and stated that the "reset" of the simulation undermined the events of the episode, and labelled the reveal of the vault "underwhelming", stating that "Extremis" was "two different half episodes that are really just setup for later". Despite this, Jackson complimented the theme of the Doctor's blindness and how it played into the episode, and how the scenes at CERN changed effortlessly between the comical and the horrified realisation, with certain parts of the episode being "outright creepy".
