= The Doctor, the Widow and the Wardrobe =

225 – "The Doctor, the Widow and the Wardrobe"
- Doctor Who episode

Cast
- Doctor: Matt Smith – Eleventh Doctor
- Others: Claire Skinner – Madge Arwell; Karen Gillan – Amy Pond; Arthur Darvill – Rory Williams; Maurice Cole – Cyril Arwell; Holly Earl – Lily Arwell; Alexander Armstrong – Reg Arwell; Sam Stockman – Co-pilot; Bill Bailey – Droxil; Paul Bazely – Ven-Garr; Arabella Weir – Billis; Spencer Wilding – Wooden King; Paul Kasey – Wooden Queen

Production
- Directed by: Farren Blackburn
- Written by: Steven Moffat
- Produced by: Marcus Wilson
- Executive producers: Steven Moffat; Piers Wenger; Caroline Skinner
- Music by: Murray Gold
- Running time: 60 minutes
- First broadcast: 25 December 2011

Chronology
← Preceded by "The Wedding of River Song"	Followed by → "Asylum of the Daleks"

"The Doctor, the Widow and the Wardrobe" is an episode of the British science fiction television series Doctor Who. First broadcast on BBC One on 25 December 2011, it is the seventh Doctor Who Christmas special since the show's revival in 2005. It was written by Steven Moffat and directed by Farren Blackburn. Internationally, the special was shown on BBC America in the United States and on Space in Canada the same day as the British broadcast, with ABC1 in Australia showing it one day later.

In the special, alien time traveller the Doctor (Matt Smith) is the caretaker of recently widowed Madge Arwell (Claire Skinner) and her children Lily (Holly Earl) and Cyril (Maurice Cole) during their holiday vacation in 1941 Britain. The Doctor plans to take them on a treat to a snowy planet through a portal in a present he has placed under the Christmas tree, but Cyril opens it before Christmas and wanders through. While looking for him, the others learn that the trees of the planet are about to be melted down with acid rain for energy.

"The Doctor, the Widow, and the Wardrobe" marked the end of Piers Wenger's tenure as executive producer, and the debut of Caroline Skinner in the same position. Adapting elements of C.S. Lewis's children's novel The Lion, the Witch and the Wardrobe, Moffat intended the episode to be the most "Christmassy" of the Doctor Who Christmas specials, while Blackburn felt there was "magic" in it. It was filmed in September and October 2011, with some scenes taking place in an authentic Lancaster bomber. "The Doctor, the Widow and the Wardrobe" was watched by 10.77 million viewers in the United Kingdom, making it the third most-watched programme on Christmas Day. Critical reception to the episode was positive, though some felt that the high-profile comedic guest stars Bill Bailey and Arabella Weir were underused.

== Plot ==
=== Prequel ===
On 6 December 2011, a prequel to the episode was released online. The Eleventh Doctor is seen on a spaceship holding a red button which, when he lets go, will cause the space ship to explode. While holding the button, he has phoned the TARDIS to speak to Amy asking her to rescue him, although he does not have his co-ordinates, Amy cannot fly the TARDIS, and she is not on the TARDIS. The Doctor wishes Amy a Merry Christmas before letting go of the button, and the spaceship explodes.

=== Synopsis ===
On Christmas Eve 1941, the Doctor becomes caretaker to Madge Arwell and her children, Lily and Cyril, as a favour to Madge for helping the Doctor find his TARDIS three years earlier. Madge has received a telegram that the children's father Reg disappeared over the English Channel a few days earlier, but decides not to tell her children yet, hoping to keep their spirits up through the holiday.

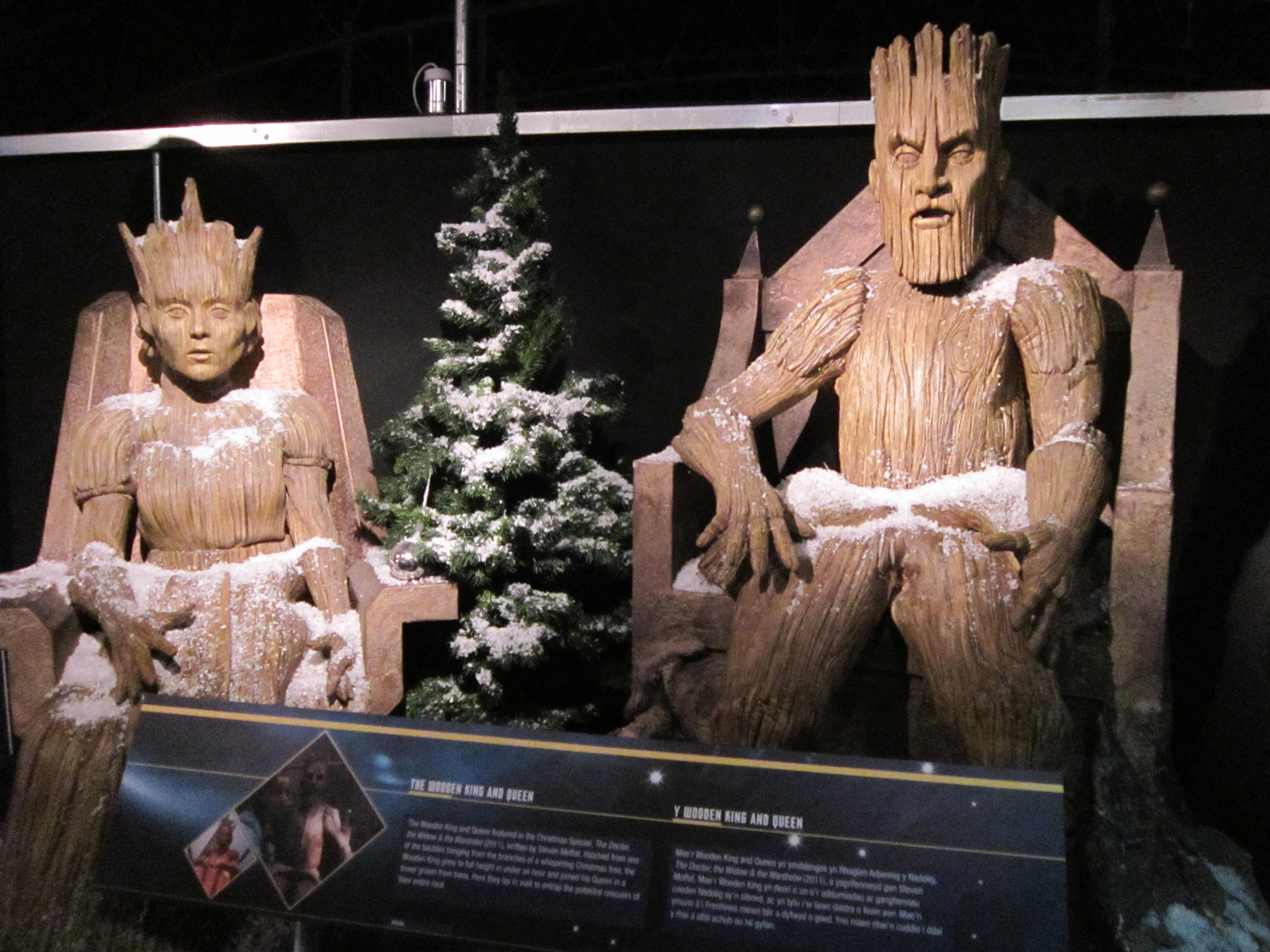
The wood creatures, as they appear at the Doctor Who Experience.

That night, Cyril is lured into opening a large glowing present under the Christmas tree, revealing a time portal to a snow-covered forest. The Doctor shortly discovers Cyril's absence and follows him with Lily; they eventually track Cyril to a strange lighthouse-like structure. Madge, finding her children missing, soon follows them into the forest, but is met by three miners in space suits. The miners tell Madge that the forest of the planet they are on is scheduled to be melted by acid rain within minutes, killing anything within it. At the lighthouse, Cyril is met by a humanoid creature made of wood; it places a simple band of metal around his head like a crown. Lily and the Doctor arrive, followed by another wood creature, but find the creatures have rejected Cyril as he is "weak", as they do the Doctor. The Doctor concludes that the life forces of the trees in the forest are trying to escape through a living creature, with the crown acting as an interface.

Madge safely reunites with her children as the acid rain starts. The wood creatures identify her as "strong", and the Doctor realises they consider her the "mothership", able to carry the life force safely. Donning the band, Madge absorbs the life force of the forest, allowing her to direct the top of the lighthouse as an escape pod away from the acid rain and into the time vortex. Reg's plane follows the light of the pod through the time vortex and safely arrives outside the house at Christmas, reuniting Reg with his family. The life force of the forest have converted themselves to ethereal beings within the time vortex. The Doctor then reveals himself as the man Madge saved and thanks her formally and they bid each other farewell. Believing that Amy and Rory still think he is dead and encouraged by Madge, the Doctor joins them for Christmas dinner.

== Production ==
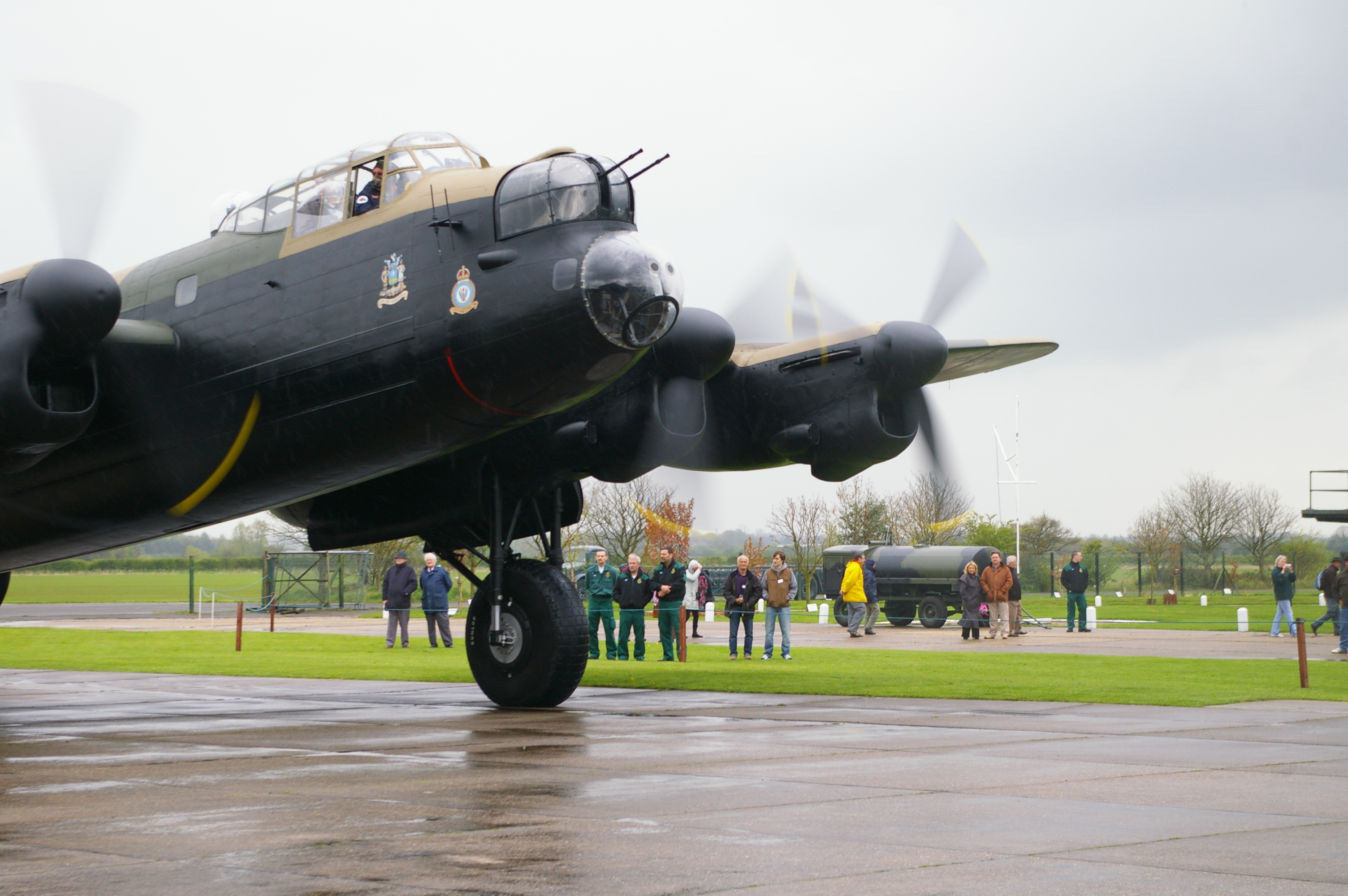
The Lincolnshire Aviation Heritage Centre's preserved Lancaster bomber Just Jane, used in the programme

"The Doctor, the Widow and the Wardrobe" was written by head writer and executive producer Steven Moffat, who wanted it to be "the most Christmassy Christmas special ever". He stated that "nothing is more fun to write" than the Doctor at Christmas, as he considered it "his kind of day. Everything's bright and shiny, everybody's having a laugh, and nobody minds if you wear a really stupid hat". The story is partly inspired by The Lion, the Witch and the Wardrobe (from The Chronicles of Narnia) by C. S. Lewis. Moffat said that Doctor Who and the Narnia stories "come from the same impulse that children have of escaping to another world."

The scene in which the Doctor is showing the Arwells around the house originally included a scene in a "haunted coal cellar". The characters of Ven-Garr and Billis are named after outgoing executive producers Piers Wenger and Beth Willis, both of whom served with Moffat. The three tree harvesters are from Androzani Major in the year 5345, a planet which features in the serial The Caves of Androzani (1984). The Doctor mentions the Forest of Cheem, which appeared in the Ninth Doctor episode "The End of the World". He mentions that one of them fancied him; during that episode one sacrificed her life for him.

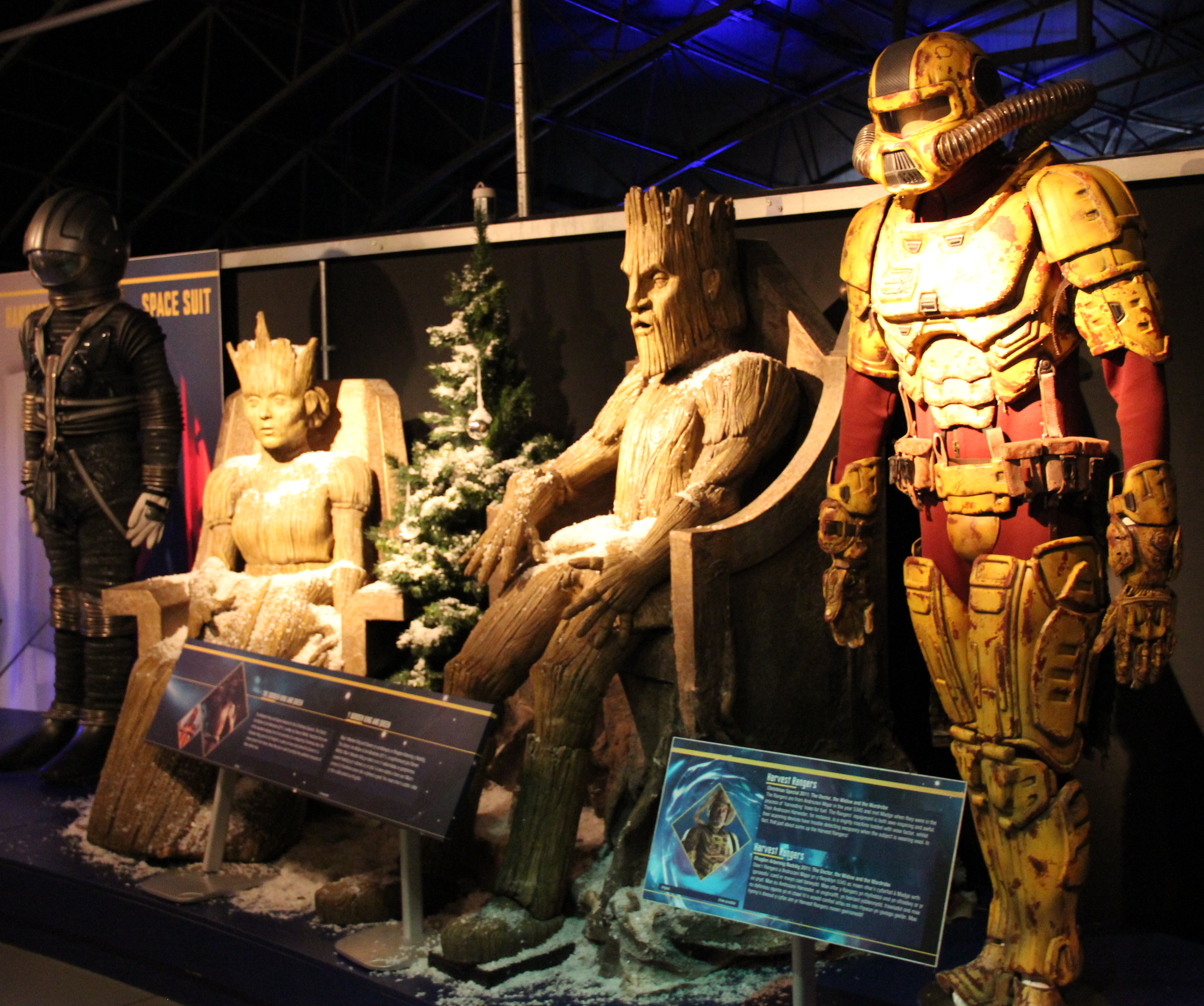
Several costumes and creatures in the episode, the spacesuit from the start of the episode, the Wooden Queen and King, and the Harvest Ranger costumes, on display at the Doctor Who Experience.

"The Doctor, the Widow and the Wardrobe" marks the debut of Caroline Skinner and sees the end of Wenger as executive producers. The two had previously worked together; Moffat commented it "will be the smoothest hand-over we've done". The special was directed by Farren Blackburn, who had previously worked with Skinner on The Fades. Blackburn stated that he was "daunted, thrilled and excited at the same time" about the job and that it was "tough". Blackburn's favorite sequences to direct were the opening sequence and the scenes set on the winter planet, where he "really felt like [he] was making a movie". When asked about the tone he wished to create, Blackburn replied,

I would say there is a kind of mix. It goes through several worlds. It's most definitely a classic action-adventure but I think it merges into the Edwardian children's story and there's a sort of Tim Burton-esque magic about it as well. I think there's a magic throughout the episode, but there is an underlying suspense and tension and darkness to it as well. So I think it merges those three things with an awful lot of Christmas about it.

The BBC announced in September 2011 that production had started for the special and filming was due to be complete by mid October 2011. Filming was disrupted on 30 September by a 24-hour protest at BBC Wales because of compulsory redundancies. The opening sequence set in the corridors of a spaceship was filmed on 20 September 2011 at Uskmouth Power Station. As the conditions were very noisy, the crew had to wear ear protectors. Filming of some scenes involving Alexander Armstrong took place in and around the Lancaster bomber Just Jane at the Lincolnshire Aviation Heritage Centre on 3 October 2011. External footage of the lighthouse building took place in the Forest of Dean, Gloucestershire. Actor Matt Smith stated, "It was a really tough shoot. Out in a forest, at night, and because there were children involved, some shooting schedules had to change radically, we'd often have to shoot through, no breaks – you get lunch at midnight or something."

=== Casting ===
Alexander Armstrong was a regular on the Doctor Who spin-off The Sarah Jane Adventures as the voice of alien computer Mr Smith. Mr Smith appeared in Doctor Who in the crossover episodes "The Stolen Earth" and "Journey's End". Paul Kasey is credited as the Wooden Queen; Kasey has appeared in many Doctor Who episodes as various monsters, including Ood Sigma in "The End of Time", Nephew in "The Doctor's Wife", and a Cyberman in "Closing Time". Doctor Who Magazine, in its preview of the special, refers to Madge, Cyril and Lily as companions, with nine-year-old Maurice Cole's Cyril Arwell defined as the youngest companion in the history of the franchise.

Arabella Weir previously appeared as an alternate incarnation of the Third Doctor in the Doctor Who Unbound audio drama Exile. Weir was "genuinely surprised and completely thrilled" to be offered the part. Bill Bailey was pleased to be given a comedic human character, explaining, "The fact that I am almost playing a human means the expressions are easier to do. If I was an Ood, with a face full of tentacles, that would have been harder to bring the funny".

== Broadcast and reception ==
"The Doctor, the Widow and the Wardrobe" was first broadcast in the United Kingdom on 25 December 2011, Christmas Day, on BBC One and on the same date on BBC America in the United States, and Space in Canada. In Australia it was shown on 26 December on ABC1. In the UK, overnight ratings showed that the special was watched by 8.9 million, coming in fourth for Christmas Day. The final consolidated rating was 10.77 million viewers, ranking Doctor Who third for both Christmas Day and the entire week. On BBC's online iPlayer, "The Doctor, the Widow and the Wardrobe" was watched 434,000 times by 6 January 2012. The special received an Appreciation Index of 84.

=== Critical reception ===
The special received positive reviews. On Rotten Tomatoes, it holds an approval rating of 100% based on 6 reviews, and an average score of 8.5/10. Dan Martin of The Guardian noted that it was "the smallest – yet perhaps the most enchanting – Christmas special we've had to date". Noting that it featured a typical "doomed spaceship", the threat was not to the universe but one family's happiness, and the only enemies were "some misguided and underdeveloped polluters", he concluded that "Any other time of year I would gnaw holes all over this, but it's Christmas, and today it felt perfect". He felt that Claire Skinner held the episode together and the appearance of Amy "made Christmas all the more special". However, his "major niggle" was that everything was the Doctor's fault, as he left the present while knowing that most children would open their presents before Christmas. Michael Hogan, writing for The Telegraph, gave the special four and a half out of five stars. He thought that the cast of comedians were "rather under-utilised" but thought that Skinner "excelled" and Smith was also "brilliant".

Neela Debnath of The Independent described the episode as "the perfect recipe for a Christmas special", particularly praising the touching moments. In the same paper's DVD review, Ben Walsh gave "The Doctor, the Widow and the Wardrobe" four out of five stars, calling it "best Doctor Who Christmas Special for some years". He commented that "the eco-message is a bit laboured, but the central tragedy that powers this scatty episode is a poignant one". Radio Times reviewer Patrick Mulkern was pleased, despite noting that he had low expectations for the special. He particularly praised Smith's performance, although he noted that the "heart-warming" scene with Amy and Rory called for a "companions shake-up" next series. Keith Phipps of The A.V. Club gave "The Doctor, the Widow and the Wardrobe" an A−, feeling that it could stand proudly beside "A Christmas Carol", the previous Christmas special.

IGN's Matt Risley rated the episode an 8 out of 10, calling it more "classically, indulgently, infectiously Christmassy" than the previous Christmas specials. He praised the production design and special effects teams for "creating some dazzlingly memorable special effects, and a winter wonderland that was both recognisably, fuzzily Christmas incarnate and unerringly, tensely alien" but thought the supporting cast "triumphed above and beyond" the plot devices. Like Hogan, Risley commented that the comedian cast of Bailey and Weir as well as Armstrong "felt lacking". However, the next year, Risley wrote that he "got a little carried away with the festive funtimes ... On reflection, the overwhelming Christmassyness of it all was overcompensating for a pretty flimsy, frivolous plot." Nick Setchfield of SFX gave the special four out of five stars, praising Smith's acting and Blackburn's Doctor Who directing debut as well as the special effects. However, he thought that the lack of a villain was an "interesting experiment, but maybe not ideal for Christmas Day" and Bailey and Weir's forest rangers "felt like bolt-on comic relief".

=== DVD release ===
"The Doctor, the Widow and the Wardrobe", along with its prequel, received a stand-alone DVD and Blu-ray release on 12 January 2012. Both are also included in the Doctor Who Complete Seventh Series box set.

The ten Christmas specials between "The Christmas Invasion" and "Last Christmas" inclusive were released in a box set titled Doctor Who – The 10 Christmas Specials on 19 October 2015.

== Soundtrack ==
Selected pieces of score from "The Doctor, the Widow, and the Wardrobe" and the following Christmas special, as composed by Murray Gold, were included on a soundtrack released on 21 October 2013 by Silva Screen Records.
