= Robot of Sherwood =

244 – "Robot of Sherwood"
- Doctor Who episode

Cast
- Doctor: Peter Capaldi – Twelfth Doctor
- Companion: Jenna Coleman – Clara Oswald
- Others: Tom Riley – Robin Hood; Roger Ashton-Griffiths – Quayle; Sabrina Bartlett – Quayle's Ward (Marian); Ben Miller – Sheriff of Nottingham; Ian Hallard – Alan-a-Dale; Trevor Cooper – Friar Tuck; Rusty Goffe – Little John; Joseph Kennedy – Will Scarlet; Adam Jones – Walter; David Benson – Herald; David Langham – Guard; Tim Baggaley – Knight; Richard Elfyn – Voice of the Knights

Production
- Directed by: Paul Murphy
- Written by: Mark Gatiss
- Produced by: Nikki Wilson
- Executive producers: Steven Moffat; Brian Minchin
- Music by: Murray Gold
- Series: Series 8
- Running time: 46 minutes
- First broadcast: 6 September 2014

Chronology
| ← Preceded by "Into the Dalek" | Followed by → "Listen" |

"Robot of Sherwood" is the third episode of the eighth series of the British science fiction television programme Doctor Who. It was written by Mark Gatiss and directed by Paul Murphy, and was first broadcast on BBC One on 6 September 2014.

In the episode, the alien time traveller the Doctor and his companion Clara (Jenna Coleman) arrive in Sherwood Forest in 1190, where they encounter legendary hero Robin Hood (Tom Riley) as well as the gold-plundering Sheriff of Nottingham (Ben Miller), who has allied himself with robotic knights. The episode was watched by 7.28 million viewers in the UK and received generally positive reviews from television critics.

== Plot ==
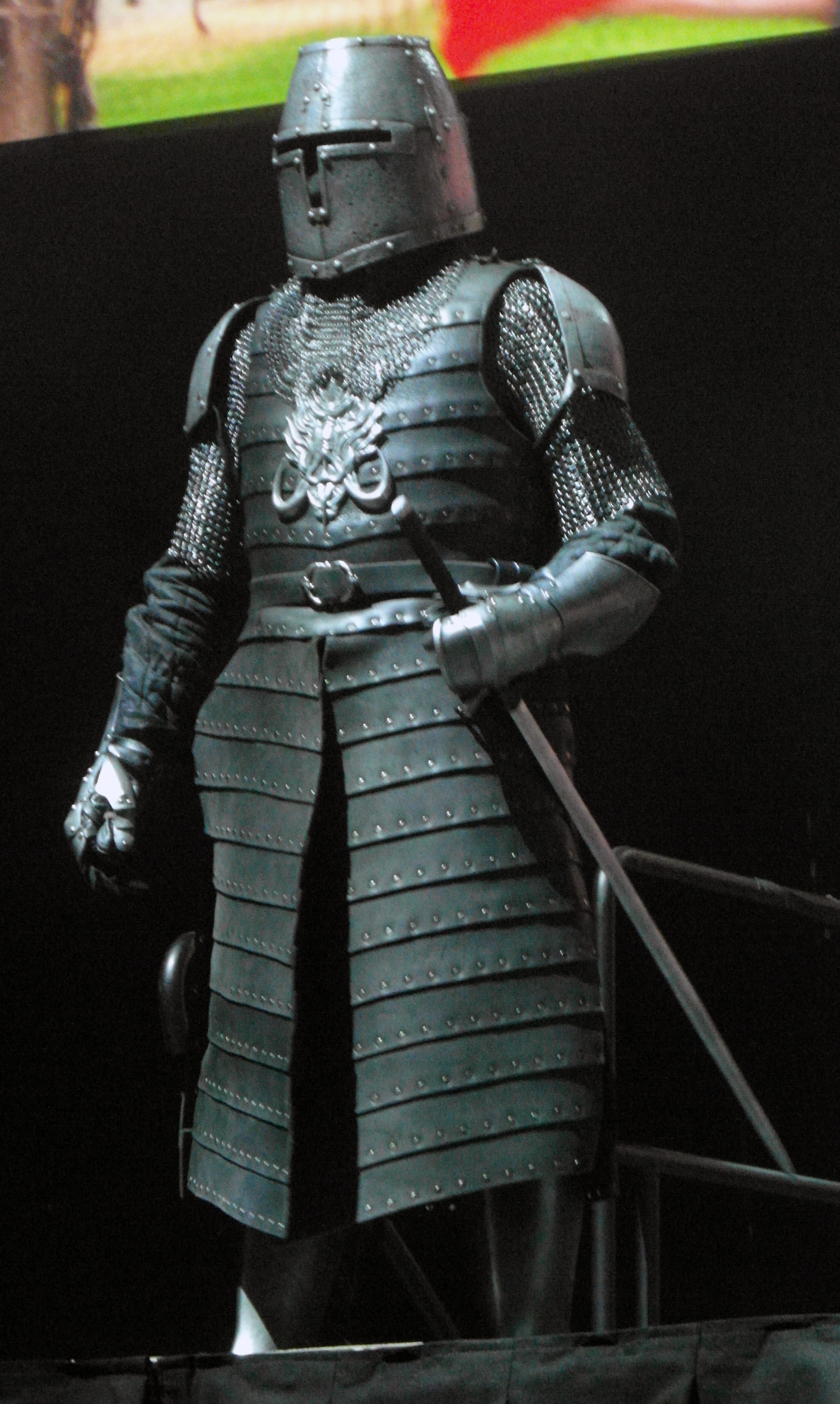
The Sheriff of Nottingham's Knights, shown here at the Doctor Who Symphonic Spectacular.

The Twelfth Doctor and Clara land in Sherwood Forest in 1190, where they are met by Robin Hood, whom the Doctor believes to be completely fictional. Robin challenges the Doctor to a duel which the Doctor wins by knocking Robin into a river with a spoon. Clara learns that Robin is looking for his Maid Marian, but the Doctor believes there is something wrong. Robin competes in an archery contest held by the Sheriff of Nottingham where the prize is a golden arrow. The Doctor interrupts the contest by exploding the target with his sonic screwdriver. Intrigued by the Doctor's power, the Sheriff commands his robot knights to capture the Doctor. The Doctor allows the robots to capture him, Robin and Clara so he can learn more about the Sheriff's plans.

The Doctor and Clara learn that the Sheriff intends to use a crashed spaceship (disguised as part of a castle) and its robot knights to take over the world. The Sheriff and the knights have plundered the countryside to collect enough gold to repair the engines' circuits, but the engines are too damaged and will create an explosion that will destroy half of England. The Doctor is initially convinced that Robin is a creation of the robots in order to give the oppressed peasants hope using the legends of Earth, but ultimately learns that he is real. Clara and Robin escape the castle, but the Doctor is taken prisoner again. The Doctor leads the prisoners in a revolt against the robots. Most of the robots are destroyed, and the prisoners flee. Robin returns to save the day. The Sheriff challenges Robin to a duel, which Robin wins by knocking the Sheriff into a gold vat using a trick the Doctor taught him.

The spaceship, controlled by the remaining robots, takes off but still lacks the power to make it off the planet. The Doctor decides to fire the golden arrow into the engines to give the ship a power boost to reach orbit. Since Robin's arm is injured (and the Doctor cheated during the archery contest), the Doctor, Clara, and Robin work together to fire the golden arrow from the contest into the ship, allowing it to reach orbit and harmlessly detonate. As he prepares to leave, the Doctor admits that Robin will be remembered as a legend rather than as a man which Robin is content with. When the Doctor continues to find Robin's story hard to believe, Robin, having learned of the Doctor's history from Clara, points out that the Doctor is of a similar background who started his adventures for the same reasons as Robin did. The Doctor and Robin mutually deny they are heroes; Robin suggests that their role is to inspire others to be heroes in their name. The Doctor and Clara depart; the Doctor leaving Robin with Maid Marian, who was a prisoner freed in the revolt.

=== Continuity ===
Sceptical about the reality of Robin Hood, his men and their environment, the Doctor initially believes that he and Clara might be in a miniscope. A miniscope was featured in the Third Doctor story Carnival of Monsters (1973).

== Production ==
=== Writing ===
In an interview with Doctor Who Magazine, writer Mark Gatiss stated that his intent with the episode was "to do the Doctor and Robin Hood in 45 minutes". He went on to state: "The premise is inherently funny, but I didn’t think of it as the funnier episode when I was doing it. It’s still asking big questions. But it’s definitely more frivolous."

=== Filming ===
The read-through for the episode was on 20 March 2014. Filming for the episode began on 25 March 2014, with location filming taking place in Fforest Fawr on 15 April 2014, and later at Caerphilly Castle on 17 April. Both Fforest Fawr and Caerphilly Castle had previously served as locations for Doctor Who, the former as a setting for scenes from "The Stolen Earth" and "Journey's End", and the latter for "Vampires of Venice" and "Nightmare in Silver". Several external shots of Bodiam Castle were also used. Filming completed on 3 May 2014.

One of the images of the Robin Hood myth that the Doctor shows to the real Robin is that of Patrick Troughton in the 1953 TV series Robin Hood, the first TV appearance by the character. Troughton played the Second Doctor between 1966 and 1969.

=== Cut scene ===
On 4 September 2014, the BBC announced that a beheading scene from the episode's climactic battle had been edited out due to the recent murders of James Foley and Steven Sotloff by the Islamic State of Iraq and the Levant. In the original scene, Robin would have decapitated the Sheriff, revealing that the Sheriff was a robot.

=== Cast notes ===
Trevor Cooper, who plays Friar Tuck in the episode, had previously appeared on Doctor Who, playing Takis in 1985's Revelation of the Daleks from season 22. Ian Hallard (Alan-a-Dale) played Richard Martin in An Adventure in Space and Time.

== Broadcast and reception ==
=== Pre-broadcast leak ===
The script for the episode was one of five scripts leaked online from a BBC Worldwide server in Miami, where they had been sent in preparation for broadcast in Latin America.

On 18 August 2014, a rough version of the episode was leaked online. The leaked version is black-and-white, and its visual and audio effects and music are preliminary and incomplete. It contains the Sheriff beheading scene (about one minute of footage) that was cut before the episode was broadcast. This leak followed the leaks of the previous two episodes, "Deep Breath" and "Into the Dalek". The BBC released a statement urging fans not to spread spoilers from the unofficial copy.

=== Broadcast ===
Overnight viewing figures showed that the episode was watched by 5.2 million viewers. Final figures show that the episode was watched by 7.28 million. In the United States, the original broadcast on BBC America was watched by 1.14 million viewers. The episode received an Audience Appreciation Index score of 82/100, considered excellent.

=== Critical reception ===
Professional ratings
Review scores
| Source | Rating |
|---|---|
| The A.V. Club | B− |
| Paste Magazine | 8.0 |
| SFX Magazine | 2/5 stars |
| TV Fanatic | 4.5/5 stars |
| CultBox | 4/5 stars |
| IndieWire | B+ |
| IGN | 6.9 |
| New York Magazine | 4/5 stars |
| Radio Times | 5/5 stars |
| Digital Spy | 4/5 stars |
| The Daily Telegraph | 5/5 stars |

The critical reception of the episode was generally positive. Dan Martin of The Guardian praised the writing and acting, but criticised the more minor role of the Doctor in the episode, and the length, which did not do the mythology justice. Patrick Mulkern of Radio Times called it "a superb, witty, heart-warming encounter between two heroes," praising Gatiss' "elegant, hugely witty script that delivers a coherent plot," and calling the Doctor and Robin Hood "one of the funniest double acts ever seen in Doctor Who." Michael Hogan of The Daily Telegraph gave the episode five stars out of five. He said this was the episode in which "Capaldi truly came into his own as The Doctor," noting his channeling of Malcolm Tucker in his Doctor made for some truly comedic moments. Simon Brew of Den of Geek commended the lightness of the episode, in contrast to Capaldi's opening two episodes and called it "hugely entertaining," and "wonderfully silly." He writes that "Robot of Sherwood" is "the kind of Doctor Who you reach for when you've got a spare hour, and just want to get a great big smile on your face."

Tim Liew of Metro criticised the episode for trying to be "too funny" and presenting a Doctor "whose behaviour jars with previous episodes". Forbes also noted the shift in personality for the Doctor, but commended Capaldi for finding "enough rope in the script to bring his interpretation to the role." They enjoyed the "extra layer the story delivered by setting everything in a 1930s Errol Flynn movie," and the development of the characters in that "every character had another shell around them." However, they felt the story had very little "substance," and that it "suffer[ed] from poor editing and direction." Neela Debnath of The Independent was likewise critical of the episode, calling it "a dull and nonsensical disappointment." She thought it to be "an oddly-pieced together episode that didn't make much sense," with "no silver linings either." She criticised the backward development of Clara as reverting to "the school girl with the crush." IGN gave a mixed review, calling it "a frivolous, flimsy throwaway adventure for the new Doctor."

== In print ==
Robot of Sherwood
- Author: David Maule
- Series: Doctor Who novelisations
- Publisher: Pearson Education
- Publication date: 15 June 2018
- ISBN: 978-1292205656

Pearson Education published a novelisation of this episode by David Maule for students of English language reading 24 May 2018.
