= The Girl Who Waited =

221 – "The Girl Who Waited"
- Doctor Who episode

Cast
- Doctor: Matt Smith – Eleventh Doctor
- Companions: Karen Gillan – Amy Pond; Arthur Darvill – Rory Williams
- Others: Josie Taylor – Check-In Girl; Imelda Staunton – Voice of Interface; Stephen Bracken-Keogh – Voice of Handbots (uncredited)

Production
- Directed by: Nick Hurran
- Written by: Tom MacRae
- Produced by: Marcus Wilson
- Executive producers: Steven Moffat; Piers Wenger; Beth Willis
- Music by: Murray Gold
- Production code: 2.10
- Series: Series 6
- Running time: 45 minutes
- First broadcast: 10 September 2011

Chronology
← Preceded by "Night Terrors"	Followed by → "The God Complex"

"The Girl Who Waited" is the tenth episode of the sixth series of the British science fiction television series Doctor Who, and was first broadcast on BBC One and BBC America on 10 September 2011. It was written by Tom MacRae and was directed by Nick Hurran.

In the episode, the alien time traveller the Doctor (Matt Smith) takes his companions Amy Pond (Karen Gillan) and her husband Rory (Arthur Darvill) to the planet Apalapucia for a holiday, but they find that the planet is on quarantine as the two-hearted natives are susceptible to a deadly plague. Amy accidentally gets separated from the Doctor and Rory but, when they try to rescue her, they arrive 36 years later in her timeline. The older Amy does not trust the Doctor, who is forced to remain on the TARDIS as he also has two hearts, and will not allow the Doctor and Rory to leave and rescue her at the correct point in her timeline.

Gillan played the older version of herself and prosthetics were applied to make her appear older. The episode was filmed on a lower budget, and MacRae decided to make the main sets all white in colour. "The Girl Who Waited" was seen by 7.6 million viewers in the UK and received positive reviews from critics.

== Plot ==
The Eleventh Doctor takes Amy and Rory on a holiday to the planet Apalapucia, unaware that the planet is suffering from a fatal plague called “Chen 7” that affects beings with two hearts, including the Doctor, and can kill them within a day (in the Doctor's case, it prevents him from regenerating). The population has created "kindness facilities", where those infected by the plague are placed in one of several thousand accelerated time streams, allowing them to live out their lives whilst in communication with their loved ones through a large glass lens in the waiting room. On their arrival, Amy is separated from the Doctor and Rory, and becomes stuck in an accelerated time stream. As the Doctor and Rory discover Amy's location, they are approached by one of the facility's "Handbot" robots. The Handbot explains the plague and, failing to recognise the Doctor or Rory as alien, attempts to administer medicine that is fatal to them. The Doctor uses the glass lens to warn Amy of this, and tells her to wait for him in the facility, promising to rescue her. The Doctor locks onto Amy's time stream.

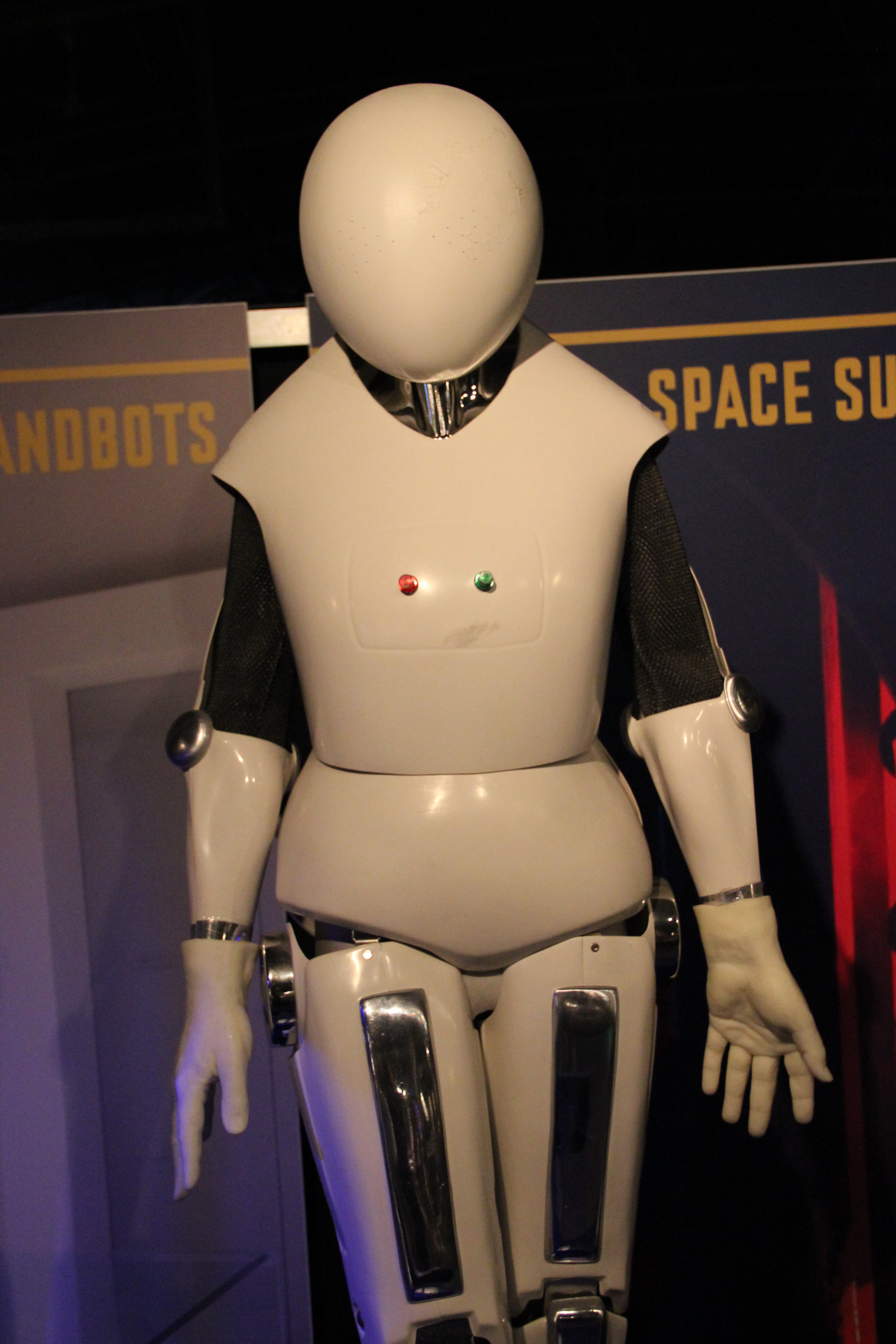
The Handbots, as they appear at the Doctor Who Experience

The Doctor, unable to leave the TARDIS due to the plague, gives Rory the lens, his sonic screwdriver, and a pair of glasses through which the Doctor can see and communicate with Rory. Rory explores the complex, and finds an older and bitter Amy, who has been waiting to be rescued for 36 years while hiding from the Handbots. The Doctor realises they have mistakenly latched onto the wrong time stream, and urges the older Amy to help find her younger self. She refuses, knowing that if the younger Amy is rescued, she will cease to exist. The Doctor warns Rory that, by taking the older Amy aboard the TARDIS, they will forgo any chance of rescuing the younger Amy. The younger Amy convinces the older Amy to change her mind by asking her to consider Rory. The older Amy agrees to help, if the Doctor would take her, too.

The Doctor temporarily brings the two Amys into the same time stream. Rory takes the younger Amy into the TARDIS. Once they are inside, the Doctor slams the door before the older Amy can enter and admits that it is impossible for both Amys to exist in the same time stream. Rory and the older Amy say goodbye at the TARDIS door before the older Amy tells him to move on without her and surrenders herself to the Handbots.

=== Continuity ===
The episode title "The Girl Who Waited" is a reference to Amy having waited 12 years (and later 2 more years) for the Doctor to return to her in "The Eleventh Hour". When describing the facilities in the Two Streams Facility, the interface says they have a replica of the amusement park at Disneyland on Clom. The planet Clom was first mentioned in "Love & Monsters" as the home planet of the Abzorbaloff and the twin planet of Raxacoricofallapatorius.

== Production ==
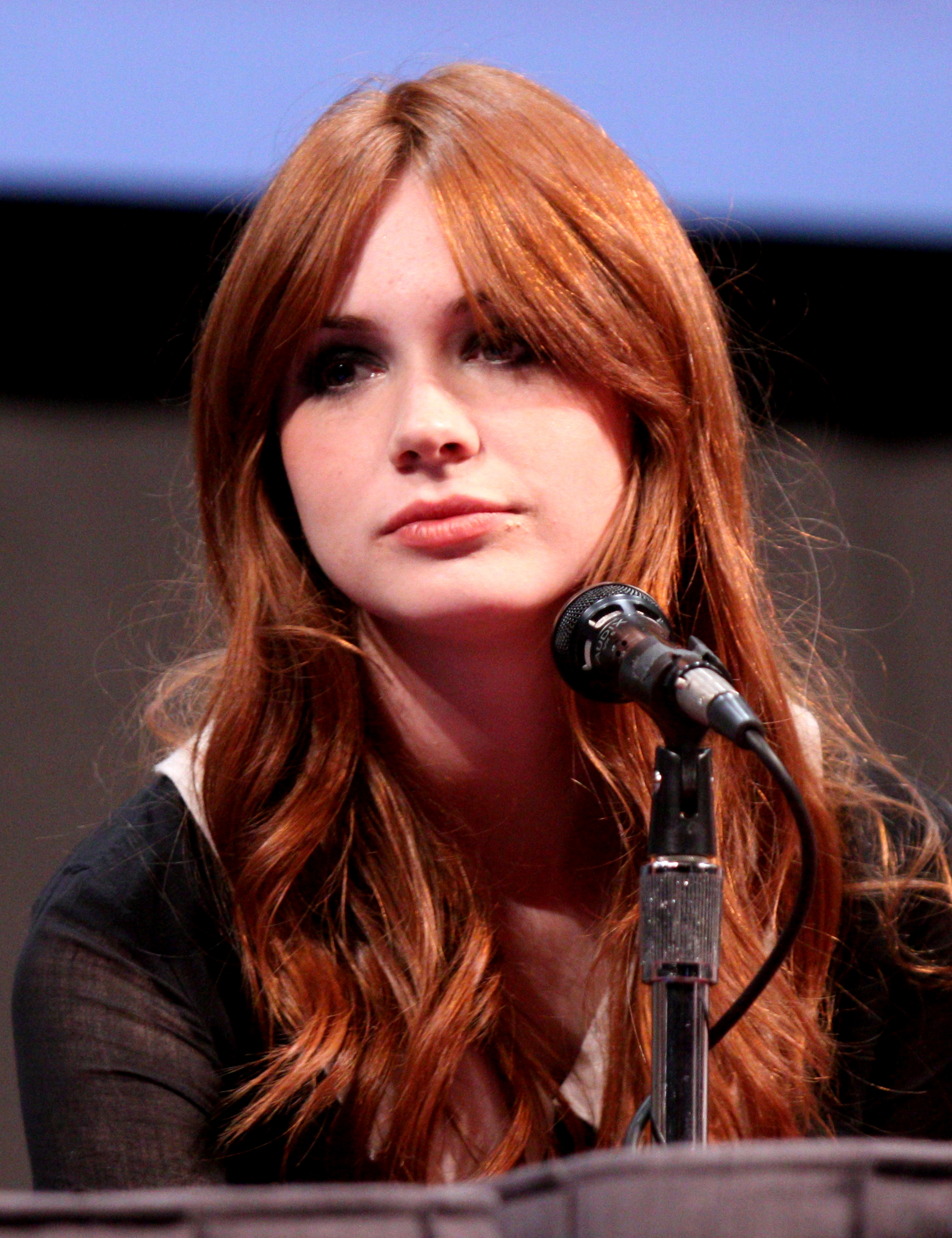
Karen Gillan volunteered to portray the older version of her character Amy Pond.

Tom MacRae, the writer of the episode, had previously written the two-parter "Rise of the Cybermen"/"The Age of Steel" for the second series, which featured the return of the Cybermen. As bringing back the Cybermen had limited plot opportunities and put MacRae in the "second seat" as a writer, he was pleased that he had the opportunity to do whatever he wanted. MacRae was proud of the finished script, calling it his "most accomplished piece of plotting ever". The original title of the episode was "The Visitors' Room". This was changed to "Visiting Hour" and then "Kindness". The episode, contrary to some reports, was never at any point titled "The Green Anchor". "The Girl Who Waited" is a title that has been used to refer to Amy after she waited 12 years for the Doctor to return in "The Eleventh Hour". Executive producer Beth Willis insisted that Amy's speech about how Rory was the most beautiful man she had ever met make it into the final version.

"The Girl Who Waited" is designed as an episode in which the actor playing the Doctor is not required for much of the shooting — these have become known as "Doctor-lite" episodes. Established with the second series episode "Love & Monsters" because of the production schedule, it has become a tradition that continued with episodes such as "Blink" and "Turn Left". MacRae enjoyed exploring Amy and Rory's characters and their past, as the Doctor was "always to a certain extent mythic" which limited what could be explored with his character. In one draft of the script, the scene near the end in which Rory and the two Amys race to the TARDIS did not include Rory in person; he was watching the scene from the lens. It also included a sequence that featured a Handbot's hand being cut and continuing to walk by itself. With "The Girl Who Waited" being a lower-budget episode, MacRae wrote for the sets to be entirely white, and described the sets as "big white boxes". He was pleased with the way it turned out, feeling that the all-white added a "really interesting visual sense to it".

The original idea was to have an older actress play the older Amy, but Karen Gillan volunteered to play the older version of her character with the aid of prosthetics. It was also decided that having Gillan play both characters would be more believable. Gillan developed different body-language, vocal range and attitude for the new individual, whose character has changed after being left behind and in danger. To achieve this, Gillan studied with a voice coach and movement coach. Gillan also wore padding which affected her movement, and stated she spent "hours in make-up".

== Broadcast and reception ==
"The Girl Who Waited" was first broadcast in the United Kingdom on BBC One on 10 September 2011 and on the same date in the United States on BBC America. Overnight viewing figures showed that it was watched by six million viewers on BBC One, which was an improvement of 0.5 million from the previous episode. The episode was also at the number one spot on BBC's iPlayer, as reported the day after it aired. The episode later topped the iPlayer chart for September. Final consolidated ratings showed a time-shift increase of 1.6 million, bringing the total up to 7.6 million viewers, up 530,000 viewers on the previous episode, "Night Terrors". The episode received an Appreciation Index of 85, placing it in the "excellent" category.

=== Critical reception ===
The episode has received critical acclaim. Dan Martin of The Guardian said that it contained "the series' most tearjerking suckerpunch so far" and the "psychedelic premise [gave] the characters the chance to shine". He praised Karen Gillan's difference in performance as the old Amy and her improvement in performance since the previous series. Martin later called it a "damn near perfect episode", rating it the best episode of the series, though the finale was not included in the list. Gavin Fuller of The Daily Telegraph gave the episode four out of five stars, praising MacRae's ability to overcome budget issues and deliver "quite a powerful and moving drama, with an ending that although inevitable still delivered a well of sadness". He thought the older Amy's "technical wizardry seemed a tad unlikely" (she manages to scrounge up a sonic screwdriver while waiting for the Doctor) but "the power of Gillan's performance skated over any minor quibbles".

In a review for The Independent, Neela Debnath said that "critics of the constant tampering with time will not like this episode" but "it is a cracker in terms of time paradoxes and the hypothetical moral dilemmas caused by said paradoxes". She praised the character development of Rory and the dynamic between the trio that had not been seen with previous characters in the show, as well as "some great moments of comedy". She also called it a "sumptuous visual delight" in the sets of the garden and the centre. IGN's Matt Risley rated the episode 8.5 out of 10, praising MacRae for straying away from a complicated time travel narrative and instead give "a simple yet refreshingly new examination of Amy Pond". He also praised Karen Gillan's climactic performance and director Nick Hurran. However, he criticised the "iffy time travel rules" and "talkiness" that ensured a slower pace. SFX magazine reviewer Nick Setchfield awarded "The Girl Who Waited" five out of five stars, praising Hurran as well as the performance of the three leads. Patrick Mulkern of Radio Times praised MacRae's dialogue because "it works so beautifully and is delivered to perfection by Karen Gillan and Arthur Darvill". He also commented on Gillan's make-up job for the older Amy, which "is brilliant in its subtlety" but wished her hair could have been "chopped or grey".

Christopher Bahn of The A.V. Club was less positive about the episode, grading it as a B−. He praised the early scene where Amy was abandoned for the "zingy dialogue" but found himself "enjoying the cleverness of the explanation without really buying into it". He expressed confusion at how the time-shift worked and thought the problem was too thin to carry out the whole episode, and that Amy's abandonment and love for Rory which was left "[didn't] pull it off". He thought that the two Amys seen in the mini episodes "Space" and "Time" were more fun to watch and the episode did not reveal anything new about Amy and Rory. However, he praised how the decision the Doctor had to make was portrayed.

The episode was nominated for the 2012 Hugo Award for Best Dramatic Presentation (Short Form), though it lost to Neil Gaiman's episode "The Doctor's Wife".
