= List of Doctor Who Christmas and New Year's specials =

The DVD cover art for Doctor Who – The 10 Christmas Specials

Doctor Who is a British science fiction television programme produced by the British Broadcasting Corporation (BBC). The show has had a large influence in the media and across society since its inception in 1963. Regular episodes were occasionally broadcast during the Christmas period during its original run from 1963 to 1989, but only made significant mention of the holiday in "The Feast of Steven" (1965). Beginning with the programme's revival in 2005, yearly special Christmas episodes were produced in addition to a regular series until 2017. From 2019 to 2022, the show temporarily transitioned to New Year's Day specials and episodes instead. Beginning in 2023, the programme returned to producing Christmas specials.

Doctor Who revolves around an alien Time Lord called the Doctor who travels with a companion in a time and space machine called the TARDIS. Instead of dying, the Doctor regenerates by changing every cell in their body and taking on a new appearance. Throughout their adventures the Doctor and their companion frequently stop other aliens from committing acts of violence.

The holiday episodes have proven to be a success with viewers, by bringing in larger viewing figures than regular episodes of the programme. The 2007 special, "Voyage of the Damned", is the most-viewed Doctor Who episode since 1979. "A Christmas Carol" is often considered by critics to be the best Christmas episode.

In 2015, a DVD and Blu-ray boxset was released containing 10 of the Christmas specials. Doctor Who, along with other television series in the Whoniverse, has occasionally broadcast episodes on other holidays.

== History ==
=== Classic era ===
During the first run of the programme (1963–1989), special episodes were not a frequent occurrence. During the third season, the twelve-part serial The Daleks' Master Plan was broadcast weekly beginning in November 1965 and ending in January 1966, with its seventh and eighth episodes scheduled for Christmas and New Year's Day, respectively. The former, "The Feast of Steven", was scripted as a comic interlude in the style of a pantomime, in the middle of an otherwise epic adventure. In its final scene, as the Doctor and his companions celebrate Christmas with a toast, the First Doctor (William Hartnell) turns to the camera and breaks the fourth wall by saying "Incidentally, a happy Christmas to all of you at home." The following episode, "Volcano", returns to the main narrative of The Daleks' Master Plan, although its ending briefly features a contemporary New Year's Eve. The first episodes of Day of the Daleks (1972) and The Face of Evil (1977) were first shown on New Year's Day, but make no reference to the holiday season. The classic run had no subsequent holiday episodes.

=== Revived era ===
When Doctor Who was revived in 2005, with Russell T Davies acting as showrunner, the first proper Christmas special, "The Christmas Invasion", was broadcast in 2005. This became a yearly tradition for the programme with additional holiday specials being produced annually. A special episode aired on New Year's Day in 2010 in addition to the typical Christmas episode in 2009. The trend of episodes airing on Christmas Day continued under Davies' successor Steven Moffat, culminating in his final episode as showrunner, "Twice Upon a Time" (2017). After Chris Chibnall assumed the role of showrunner of the series in 2018, Doctor Who moved to producing yearly New Year's specials instead. The three holiday specials made during Chibnall's tenure, airing in 2019, 2021, and 2022, all featured the Daleks and formed a loose three-part story arc. In lieu of a special episode in 2020, the first episode of the twelfth series, "Spyfall, Part 1", was broadcast on New Year's Day outside of the programme's normal timeslot. When Davies returned to Doctor Who, one of the first things he requested was the return of the Christmas special. A special was not produced for the 2022 holiday season, but a new trailer for the programme's 60th anniversary was released in its absence. Christmas specials then returned with "The Church on Ruby Road" in 2023. Moffat also returned to write the 2024 special, "Joy to the World", the first festive special not to be written by the incumbent showrunner.

In 2025, following the conclusion of the fifteenth series, the BBC announced that a further Christmas special, written by Davies, would air in 2026. In June 2026 it was announced that the special would no longer be going ahead.

== Episodes ==
=== Tenth Doctor ===
Doctor Who Christmas and New Year's episodes
No. story	Title	Directed by	Written by	Original release date	UK viewers (millions)
167	"The Christmas Invasion"	James Hawes	Russell T Davies	25 December 2005	9.84
Rose Tyler and the newly regenerated Tenth Doctor return to her mother Jackie's flat, where her mother and former boyfriend Mickey Smith carry the Doctor inside to rest. When out shopping, Rose and Mickey are attacked by Santa robots; the Doctor theorises that energy from his regeneration has lured them there. Prime Minister Harriet Jones is threatened by the leader of the Sycorax to give them half of the Earth's population as slaves; Harriet tries to negotiate and is teleported onto their ship. The Sycorax detect the TARDIS and transport it to their ship, with Rose, Mickey, and the Doctor inside. After the Doctor has fully recovered, he challenges the Sycorax leader to a sword fight for the future of the Earth, which he eventually wins. However, the Sycorax ship is destroyed against the Doctor's wishes by Harriet Jones, who had called Torchwood on the matter.
178	"The Runaway Bride"	Euros Lyn	Russell T Davies	25 December 2006	9.35
Lance, a worker at a security firm once owned by Torchwood, slowly and secretly poisons his fiancée, secretary Donna Noble, with Huon particles over the course of six months to use Donna's biology as a catalyst to awaken the children of the omnivorous Empress of the Racnoss, hibernating at the centre of the Earth. The reaction of the particles causes Donna to appear inside the TARDIS. The Tenth Doctor attempts to return Donna to her wedding, but they miss the ceremony. The Empress uses the Huon particles inside Donna and Lance to wake her children up, and feeds Lance to her children by dropping him down a shaft under the River Thames leading directly to her children. The Empress attacks humanity with her Christmas star shaped spaceship. The Doctor requests he finds the Racnoss another world for them to peacefully exist. The Empress declines the request, and the Doctor uses explosive baubles to flood the shaft with water from the Thames. The army kills the Empress with tanks and artillery after all her energy is used up. The Doctor invites Donna to travel with him, but she declines, suggesting that he needs someone to keep his temperament in check.
188	"Voyage of the Damned"	James Strong	Russell T Davies	25 December 2007	13.31
The Tenth Doctor repairs the damage to the TARDIS from crashing into the Titanic, before landing on the ship. He discovers it is not the RMS Titanic, but instead a duplicate starliner. The Doctor meets waitress Astrid Peth, before joining an excursion to London. The Doctor notes that London is abandoned. As part of cruise line owner Max Capricorn's revenge plot after Max's board votes him out of his company, Captain Hardaker drops the vessel's shielding, causing meteors to be pulled toward the ship. The vessel begins plunging toward the Earth. Max has the Heavenly Host androids kill any survivors. The Host take the Doctor to Max Capricorn. Following the Doctor, Astrid uses a forklift to push Max into the ship's engine, seemingly killing herself too. Reaching the bridge, the Doctor uses the heat from the re-entry to restart and stabilise the ship. The Doctor retrieves Astrid's pattern from her teleport bracelet, before her ghostly remains dissipate into space.
199	"The Next Doctor"	Andy Goddard	Russell T Davies	25 December 2008	13.10
The Tenth Doctor lands in Victorian London and, overhearing cries for help, encounters a man calling himself "the Doctor" and his companion Rosita Farisi attempting to capture a Cybershade, which escapes. The Doctor initially believes this man is a future incarnation of himself suffering from amnesia. The man is investigating a series of disappearances around London and the Cybershades. They discover Cybermen data-storage infostamps, which the man recalls holding when he lost his memories. The Doctor realises that the man is actually Jackson Lake, a missing human who believed he was the Doctor due to absorbing the data of infostamp about the Doctor. The Cybermen have constructed, using child labour, a "CyberKing" (a giant mechanical Cyberman), using their human ally Miss Hartigan as its controller. The Doctor discovers another entrance to the Cybermen's base under Jackson's house. The Doctor, Jackson, and Rosita manage to rescue the children, including Jackson's son. The CyberKing rampages over London. The Doctor uses the infostamps to sever Hartigan's connection to the CyberKing. The emotional feedback destroys both the Cybermen and Hartigan. Using technology from Jackson's cellar, the Doctor sucks the toppling CyberKing into the Time Vortex.
202a	"The End of Time – Part One"	Euros Lyn	Russell T Davies	25 December 2009	12.04
On the Ood-Sphere in 4226, the Ood warn the Doctor that the Master has returned, heralding "the end of time". On Earth, a cult of women resurrect the Master, but Lucy Saxon sabotages the ceremony, causing the Master to be brought back with incredible strength and constant hunger. Arriving back on Earth on Christmas Eve, the Doctor encounters Wilfred. The Doctor finds the Master at wastelands outside London, and learns that the Master has been suffering from hearing the sound of drums. The Master is taken by armed troops and placed in custody of Joshua Naismith. Naismith has recovered a broken alien "Immortality Gate" and wants the Master to fix its programming. The Doctor regroups with Wilfred; a woman in white warns Wilfred to arm himself before departing. At Naismith's mansion, the Doctor and Wilfred meet two Vinvocci disguised as humans, who assert the Gate is a harmless medical device. The Master activates the Gate, which he has reprogrammed to replace all of humankind's DNA with his own; only Wilfred and Donna are unchanged, and Donna remembers the Doctor. Elsewhere, the President of the Time Lords, Rassilon, asserts their plan to bring back the Time Lords.
202b	"The End of Time – Part Two"	Euros Lyn	Russell T Davies	1 January 2010	12.27
The Doctor and Wilfred become fugitives from the Master and his duplicates, and take refuge on a spacecraft. The Lord President implants the sound of drums (revealed to be a Time Lord's heartbeat) in the Master's head as a child. He also creates a whitepoint star that allows the Time Lords to bring Gallifrey to Earth, inadvertently releasing the horrors of the Time War alongside it. The Lord President and other Time Lords appear in Naismith's mansion. The Doctor jumps from the spacecraft into Naismith's mansion. He debates shooting the Master or the President, who plans to destroy the Time Vortex and the universe so that the Time Lords can become beings of pure consciousness. The Doctor fires the gun at the whitepoint star, shattering it. As Gallifrey is pulled back, Rassilon attempts to kill the Doctor, but the Master intervenes, restoring humanity. The Doctor finds Wilfred is trapped in one of the Gate's control rooms that is about to be flooded by radiation. The Doctor absorbs the radiation, but knows that the radiation has triggered his regeneration. After returning Wilfred home, the Doctor visits past companions. Inside his TARDIS, the Doctor regenerates into his eleventh incarnation (Matt Smith).

=== Eleventh Doctor ===
Doctor Who Christmas and New Year's episodes
No. story	Title	Directed by	Written by	Original release date	UK viewers (millions)
213	"A Christmas Carol"	Toby Haynes	Steven Moffat	25 December 2010	12.11
A space liner containing 4,000 people and Amy Pond and Rory Williams on their honeymoon becomes caught in an electrified cloud. The Doctor, summoned by Amy, lands on the planet beneath and discovers that the atmosphere is controlled by the miserly Kazran Sardick, who refuses to let the ship safely land. The Doctor travels back to Kazran's youth and attempts to alter his past to make him kinder, spending time adventuring with young Kazran and a young woman named Abigail, who was released from a cryogenic chamber as her singing abilities calm the sharks which occupy the atmosphere. However, Abigail was suffering from an incurable disease, and Kazran grows up bitter that she cannot be let out again or she will die; but the Doctor shows Kazran's younger self what he would become and he decides to release the ship. Unfortunately, Kazran's personality has changed too much for the atmosphere controls to recognise him, and the Doctor must convince Kazran to release Abigail so she can sing and calm the atmosphere, and the two enjoy their last time together.
225	"The Doctor, the Widow and the Wardrobe"	Farren Blackburn	Steven Moffat	25 December 2011	10.77
The Doctor crash-lands on Earth in 1938. He is helped back to the TARDIS by Madge Arwell. Three years later, Madge's husband Reg has disappeared while piloting an Avro Lancaster bomber in the Second World War, but she keeps it a secret from her two children, Lily and Cyril. They evacuate London to stay at a house in Dorset, where the Doctor masquerades as the caretaker. Cyril is lured through a present, which is a portal to a winter planet. Looking for Cyril, the Doctor and Lily and later Madge enter the box; Madge encounters miners, who plan to harvest the trees. Lily and the Doctor follow Cyril's tracks to a tower where wooden humanoids attempt to put a crown on Cyril, which will allow the souls of the trees to escape. When Madge arrives, she is deemed strong enough to pilot the top of the tower to safety. When they land, Reg is alive as he had followed the light from the tower and landed safely. The Doctor turns down Christmas dinner with the family and visits Amy and Rory, two years after he last saw them.
231	"The Snowmen"	Saul Metzstein	Steven Moffat	25 December 2012	9.87
Depressed after the loss of Amy and Rory, the Doctor hides himself in Victorian London. The "Great Intelligence", a form of "memory snow" which can mirror the thoughts of anything around it, hatches a plot to create an army of ice people. While Strax drives the Doctor around, they run into Clara, a barmaid. The Doctor refuses to investigate the snowmen and returns to the TARDIS, in a cloud above London, accessible via a staircase. Clara soon returns to her job as a governess and learns of the danger to all of humanity. She turns to the Doctor for help and he takes action. With Madame Vastra, Jenny Flint, and Strax, the Doctor and Clara defeat the Great Intelligence and its human servant. In the process, the Doctor regains his enthusiasm, deciding to take Clara on as his companion. However, Clara is thrown off the edge of a cloud and falls to her death. The Doctor discovers Clara's full name – Clara Oswin Oswald – and realises that Clara is the same person as Oswin Oswald. (Note: As shown in "Asylum of the Daleks") He concludes that she is likely still alive in some other time and leaves in the TARDIS to find her.
241	"The Time of the Doctor"	Jamie Payne	Steven Moffat	25 December 2013	11.14
A message echoing through all of time and space emanates from the farming town of Christmas on the planet Trenzalore, where a prophecy states the Doctor will spend the last of his years. With the help of the Papal Mainframe, the Doctor and Clara travel to the village and discover that the message is being sent from Gallifrey by the Time Lords. Sending Clara home, he proceeds to spend hundreds of years fighting and defending Trenzalore against hordes of aliens determined to prevent the Time Lords from returning. Clara returns to find the Daleks are the last remaining aliens, and that the Doctor has fought for so long, with no more regenerations, that he is on the cusp of dying of old age. As the Doctor faces his last stand, Clara convinces the Time Lords to give the Doctor a new regeneration cycle. The Doctor begins to regenerate, destroying the Daleks and ending the war. Clara returns to the TARDIS to find a rejuvenated Doctor about to finish his regeneration. After vowing to remember the incarnation he was and hallucinating a final goodbye to Amy Pond, he finally regenerates into the Twelfth Doctor, as the TARDIS suddenly begins crashing.

=== Twelfth Doctor ===
Doctor Who Christmas and New Year's episodes
No. story	Title	Directed by	Written by	Original release date	UK viewers (millions)
253	"Last Christmas"	Paul Wilmshurst	Steven Moffat	25 December 2014	8.28
Clara discovers Santa Claus on her rooftop. The Twelfth Doctor arrives and takes her away in the TARDIS. At the North Pole, a group of scientists work on trying to save their fellow base personnel who have been taken over by Dream Crabs, alien crabs that induce a dream state while devouring a person's brain. The Doctor and Clara arrive at the base and come under attack from the crabs, only to be rescued by Santa. Clara is slowly devoured by a crab. The Doctor enters Clara's dream with another crab to wake her. Clara and the Doctor wake up, which kills the crabs devouring them. The Doctor realises everyone is in a multi-layered dream, with Santa being part of it. They escape when they dream that Santa is flying them home. One by one they wake up until only Clara is left. The Doctor awakens and removes the crab from Clara, only to discover that Clara is now an elderly woman. Santa appears and the Doctor realises he is still dreaming. Waking up, the Doctor frees Clara, now a young adult, from the crab. He asks Clara if she wants to rejoin him aboard the TARDIS; she accepts.
263	"The Husbands of River Song"	Douglas Mackinnon	Steven Moffat	25 December 2015	7.69
The Doctor is on the planet Mendorax Dellora in 5343, where due to a case of mistaken identity he is recruited by his former companion and wife River Song to assist her in removing a diamond from the head of King Hydroflax after his maligned attempt to steal it. Surprised that River cannot identify his newest face, the Doctor struggles to break the news to her while learning how she acts on her own – and how many other lovers she has had. The Doctor and River bring the head of Hydroflax to the starship Harmony and Redemption to sell it, and a series of events causes River to discover the Doctor's identity. The starship is caught in a meteor strike and crashes into the planet Darillium, where the Doctor and River are fated to have their final date together before River dies meeting a younger Doctor. Having deliberately held it off for as long as possible, the Doctor finally decides to give in and arranges for a restaurant to be constructed on the planet. The Doctor and River then have their final date together, which lasts for 24 years – the span of a night on Darillium.
264	"The Return of Doctor Mysterio"	Ed Bazalgette	Steven Moffat	25 December 2016	7.83
The Doctor and Nardole investigate the New York branch of "Harmony Shoal", a multinational research company. Also investigating is journalist Lucy Fletcher, and they discover that Harmony Shoal is transplanting alien brains into humans. One of the alien workers finds the three, but they are rescued by the superhero called the Ghost, an alter ego for Grant Gordon, whom the Doctor met several years before when Grant was a child and accidentally turned him into a superhero. Grant is also a nanny working for Lucy, who is unaware of Grant's true identity. The Doctor and Nardole find the aliens' ship but soon discover that it has been turned into a bomb that will crash into New York as part of a complex plan to implant the alien brains into world leaders, thereby giving them control of the Earth. The Doctor aims the ship towards New York earlier than planned and the collision is stopped by Grant, revealing his identity to Lucy. After he and Lucy announce their love for each other, Grant throws the ship into the sun. UNIT then shuts down Harmony Shoal, but an alien brains implants itself into a UNIT soldier.
276	"Twice Upon a Time"	Rachel Talalay	Steven Moffat	25 December 2017	7.90
Returning to his TARDIS at the South Pole, the First Doctor refuses to regenerate. He encounters the Twelfth Doctor outside his own TARDIS in a similar state of mind. The pair are approached by a displaced First World War British captain. All three are abducted by a spaceship, where they meet Bill Potts. They are offered freedom by the ship's glass-like holographic pilot in exchange for the return of the Captain. They escape and take the First Doctor's TARDIS to Villengard. The Twelfth Doctor meets with the Dalek Rusty. Given access to the Dalek Hivemind, the Doctor learns that the pilot is designed to extract people when they died, such as Bill, and archive their memories. The Doctors agree to return the Captain to his timeline, which happens to be minutes before the Christmas truce. The First Doctor, prepared to regenerate, returns to his TARDIS. After being alone with Bill's avatar, the Doctor returns to the TARDIS and regenerates after relaying advice to his next incarnation. After the Thirteenth Doctor examines her reflection, the TARDIS suffers multiple failures. As the console room explodes and the TARDIS dematerialises, the Doctor is thrown out and plummets towards the Earth.

=== Thirteenth Doctor ===
Doctor Who Christmas and New Year's episodes
No. story	Title	Directed by	Written by	Original release date	UK viewers (millions)
287	"Resolution"	Wayne Yip	Chris Chibnall	1 January 2019	6.95
On New Year's Day 2019 in Sheffield, archaeologists Lin and Mitch unintentionally revive a deadly intelligence that has been separated and dormant on Earth since the 9th century. The Doctor is alerted to its presence and lands the TARDIS at Lin and Mitch's dig. The Doctor takes a sample of the creature's slime, while the squid-like creature attaches itself to Lin's back. At Graham and Ryan's home, the latter's father Aaron returns. Ryan agrees to talk to him, while the Doctor discovers that the creature she faces is a Dalek. Controlling Lin, the Dalek steals a ray gun belonging to its race from an archive base and constructs a makeshift Dalek casing out of scrap metal. The Doctor and her friends find Lin, freed from the Dalek's control, and the Doctor confronts the rebuilt creature. The Dalek flies off and attempts to summon a battle fleet, but the Doctor follows and defeats it with the help of Aaron's microwave oven. The exposed mutant creature possesses Aaron in an attempt to force the Doctor to take it to Skaro, but she releases it into a supernova instead. Afterward, Aaron and Ryan reconcile.
288a	"Spyfall, Part 1"	Jamie Magnus Stone	Chris Chibnall	1 January 2020	6.70
The Doctor, Yaz, Graham, and Ryan are called into MI6 by C to investigate mysterious deaths. Their only lead is Daniel Barton, the CEO of a media company. The Doctor contacts Agent O, who was tasked with monitoring extraterrestrial activities. An alien Kasaavin kills C, but the Doctor and her companions escape. Yaz and Ryan investigate Barton, who invites them to his birthday party. Graham and the Doctor find O in the Australian outback. Both groups encounter the Kasaavin, though the Doctor is able to capture one of them, discovering their hostile intentions. While sneaking into Barton's headquarters with Ryan, Yaz is captured by a Kasaavin, and the Doctor's captured Kasaavin frees itself by replacing itself with Yaz. Joined by O, the four investigate Barton at his party. After the Doctor reveals him, Barton tries to escape, so the Doctor and her companions pursue on motorbikes to Barton's private jet. Leaping aboard the jet, O reveals he is actually The Master – having been in control of Barton and the Kasaavins the whole time. A bomb detonates, and the Master escapes while the Doctor is captured by one of the aliens, leaving her companions in the falling plane. This was the first episode of the twelfth series.
296	"Revolution of the Daleks"	Lee Haven Jones	Chris Chibnall	1 January 2021	6.25
The shell of the reconnaissance Dalek (Note: As shown in "Resolution".) is intercepted by Jack Robertson, who has funded a defence drone. Graham and Ryan meet at a disguised TARDIS, where Yaz is trying to find the Doctor. Graham shows her a video of the defence drone and they confront Robertson. Jo Patterson, projected to be elected the Prime Minister, requests Robertson to increase the drone production. Scientist Leo discovers organic cells in the Dalek remnants and clones the cells into a creature, which escapes and takes control of Leo. Leo travels to Osaka, Japan, where Dalek clones are being grown. The Doctor, who has been imprisoned for a number of decades, is set free by Jack Harkness. They rejoin her companions. Jack and Yaz investigate the facility while the Doctor, Graham, and Ryan confront Robertson. The Dalek reveals its plan to take over Earth. The Dalek clones transport themselves into the defence drones. The Doctor sends out a signal to a death squad of Daleks, who eliminate the reconnaissance Daleks. The Doctor tricks the death squad Daleks into the other TARDIS where they will be transported to the Void and destroyed. Ryan and Graham decide to stay on Earth.
298	"Eve of the Daleks"	Annetta Laufer	Chris Chibnall	1 January 2022	4.30
On New Year's Eve, Nick, a frequent customer, arrives at ELF Storage, to the irritation of the owner, Sarah. The Doctor, Yaz and Dan attempt to reset the TARDIS to remove damage and anomalies caused by the Flux, intending to spend time at a beach. Instead, it lands in ELF Storage and creates a time loop to protect them from their impending deaths. As Nick exits his storage unit, he gets exterminated by a Dalek which then proceeds to kill Sarah and the TARDIS crew. The loop then resets and the events repeat themselves. Each time it resets, it shortens by a minute. Together, they have to figure out how to escape before the time loop closes; a Dalek execution squad assembles and advances their tactics with each loop. Dan begins to suspect that Yaz and the Doctor share romantic feelings. They encounter many of the strange things that Jeff, Sarah's employee, keeps in the complex, including boxes of fireworks and high explosives. As the loop closes, the group move unpredictably to outsmart the Daleks until they trick them into shooting the boxes of fireworks, destroying the facility and the Daleks, while facilitating their escape.

=== Fifteenth Doctor ===
Doctor Who Christmas and New Year's episodes
No. story	Title	Directed by	Written by	Original release date	UK viewers (millions)
304	"The Church on Ruby Road"	Mark Tonderai	Russell T Davies	25 December 2023	7.49
Nineteen years ago, a hooded woman abandons her baby outside a church. In the present day, the foundling – Ruby Sunday – is trying to find her birth parents using a DNA test, to no avail. After an interview with Davina McCall, Ruby finds herself repeatedly experiencing bad luck and has several encounters with the Fifteenth Doctor. After her adoptive mother, Carla, fosters another baby, Ruby witnesses goblins kidnapping the baby and boards their flying ship to save her, encountering the Doctor again. Held captive by the goblins, the Doctor reveals the goblins have manipulated time to cause Ruby's bad luck and feed on coincidence – namely Ruby and the baby sharing a birthday on Christmas Eve. The Doctor and Ruby save the baby from being eaten by the goblins and return her home. Coincidences binding the Doctor and Ruby lead to the goblins time-travelling and eating Ruby as a baby. The Doctor travels back nineteen years to save baby Ruby, destroying the goblins and their ship. Returning to the present day, the Doctor and Ruby reunite but he goes to leave in the TARDIS. Ruby deduces the Doctor is a time traveller and accompanies him.
312	"Joy to the World"	Alex Sanjiv Pillai	Steven Moffat	25 December 2024	5.91
The Doctor arrives at the Time Hotel, an establishment that allows visits to historical points. The Doctor enlists the aid of Trev, a hotel employee, as he investigates a mysterious briefcase. Trev's Silurian manager arrives in Joy Almondo's hotel room with the briefcase and the Doctor following him. The briefcase takes control of Joy, and the Doctor finds a strange device inside about to disintegrate Joy; suddenly a Doctor from the future arrives from the Time Hotel with the required code. The future Doctor returns to the Time Hotel with Joy, stranding the current Doctor. He takes a job working at the hotel, befriending the manager Anita, awaiting an opportunity to get back to the Time Hotel, which he does a year later. He opens a door to the distant past, where he frees Joy by provoking her anger. The briefcase, of Villengard origin, is to be used to create an energy source. Trev, who connected psychically to Villengard's system before he died, reveals the briefcase's location. The Doctor opens it, but Joy lets the star seed enter her. Joy pilots it into space, where it detonates safely as the Star of Bethlehem, and the star gives hope and comfort to those who see it.

== Reception and impact ==
Doctor Who holiday specials have consistently brought in higher viewing figures than other episodes of the programme. "Voyage of the Damned" was seen by 11.7 million people, making it the most-viewed episode of Doctor Who since its revival in 2005, as well as the most-viewed Doctor Who episode overall since 1979. "A Christmas Carol" is frequently considered by critics to be the best holiday special, while others have named the best to be "The Runaway Bride", "Last Christmas", or "The Husbands of River Song".

Richard Riley, a Biostatistics professor at the University of Birmingham, conducted a study and claimed that there was a connection between Doctor Who Christmas specials and lower death rates across England and Wales. The study compared mortality rates across the UK from 2005–2017 to those from years before the specials began. Riley said that as many as seven fewer deaths per 10,000 people occur when the specials were consistently broadcast. A further editorial by the professor admitted that while there were "impeccable mathematical models [...] a single television broadcast cannot affect an entire country's mortality rates."

== Home media release ==
The Christmas specials between "The Christmas Invasion" (2005) and "Last Christmas" (2014), inclusive, were released as a DVD and Blu-ray boxset titled Doctor Who – The 10 Christmas Specials on 9 November 2015.

== Other Whoniverse holiday episodes ==
The Doctor Who episodes "Planet of the Dead" (2009) and "Legend of the Sea Devils" (2022) were broadcast on Holy Saturday and Easter Sunday, respectively, in years that lacked a full series. Many series of the revived era either launched or aired a new episode during Easter weekend. Additionally, the first episode of the thirteenth series, "The Halloween Apocalypse" (2021), was shown on Halloween itself.

In 2007, the Doctor Who spin-off programme Torchwood aired the final two episodes of its first series, "Captain Jack Harkness" and "End of Days", on New Year's Day. That same day, the first episode of another spin-off, The Sarah Jane Adventures, was also broadcast. The penultimate episode of Torchwood's second series aired on Good Friday.

== See also ==
- Lists of Doctor Who episodes
