= Last Christmas (Doctor Who) =

253 – "Last Christmas"
- Doctor Who episode
- The Doctor, with Clara as an elderly woman. Jenna Coleman's reversal of her decision to leave the series determined the ending of the episode.

Cast
- Doctor: Peter Capaldi – Twelfth Doctor
- Companion: Jenna Coleman – Clara Oswald
- Others: Nick Frost – Santa Claus; Samuel Anderson – Danny Pink; Dan Starkey – Ian; Nathan McMullen – Wolf; Faye Marsay – Shona; Natalie Gumede – Ashley; Maureen Beattie – Bellows; Michael Troughton – Professor Albert

Production
- Directed by: Paul Wilmshurst
- Written by: Steven Moffat
- Produced by: Paul Frift
- Executive producers: Steven Moffat; Brian Minchin
- Music by: Murray Gold
- Running time: 60 minutes
- First broadcast: 25 December 2014

Chronology
← Preceded by "Death in Heaven"	Followed by → "The Magician's Apprentice"

"Last Christmas" is an episode of the British science fiction television series Doctor Who that was first broadcast on 25 December 2014. It is the tenth Christmas special since the show's revival in 2005. It was written by showrunner Steven Moffat and directed by Paul Wilmshurst.

In the special, the alien time traveller the Doctor is reunited with his companion, Clara Oswald, as they try to save a North Pole science base from creatures called dream crabs that induce dream states whilst killing their victims, with the help of Santa Claus.

"Last Christmas" was viewed by 8.28 million in the United Kingdom and received positive reviews from critics, particularly for Capaldi and Coleman's performances, and for the "clever" spin on the usual Christmas atmosphere.

== Plot ==
On Christmas Eve, Clara finds Santa Claus stranded on her roof. The Doctor arrives to take Clara away. Santa tells the Doctor that he will need his help before the night is over. The Doctor and Clara arrive at a North Pole base where four of the crew in the infirmary are being devoured by Dream Crabs – blind aliens which induce dreams on their intended victims as a distraction whilst devouring the victims' brains and which use telepathy to see the surroundings of people thinking about a crab. More crabs attack the Doctor, Clara, and the unaffected crew, only for Santa to rescue them. Clara reveals that during their last meeting, (Note: As depicted in the previous episode "Death in Heaven" (2014).) she lied to the Doctor about saving Danny Pink's, her boyfriend, life. The Doctor says that he lied about finding his home planet, Gallifrey. The Doctor sends Clara to recover Santa's crab specimen, but Clara, thinking about the crab, makes it come alive and attack her.

Clara reunites with Danny in a dream. The Doctor willingly falls victim to another crab to enter the dream. Clara still resists willing herself to wake up, until Danny tells her that she can miss him while also moving on with her life. Clara and the Doctor wake up, which kills the crabs devouring them. The Doctor deduces that they are not awake, but in a different layer of a multi-faceted dream and have been since the initial crab attack. He explains that Santa is the manifestation of their subconscious minds fighting back. Santa wakes the group up.

Clara reminds the Doctor that they met Santa before arriving, proving that everything else has also been a dream and that none of the scientists are scientists. The affected personnel, manifestations of their minds, attack and kill Professor Albert. The Doctor, Clara, and the scientists dream of Santa, who wakes them up to their real lives, one by one, until only Clara is left.

Upon waking, the Doctor traces the psychic signal linking their dreams back to Clara. He pulls the crab off and learns that Clara is now an elderly woman. The Doctor regrets not coming back sooner. However, when Santa appears he realises that he is still dreaming, the Doctor wakes up again. He frees Clara, still a young adult, from the crab. Offering her all of time and space, the Doctor implores Clara to join him. Clara accepts.

== Production ==
=== Writing ===
"Last Christmas" was written by showrunner Steven Moffat. It was the fifth Christmas special he wrote and the tenth overall. The scene where the Doctor visits the elderly Clara and helps her open a Christmas cracker mirrors a scene from "The Time of the Doctor", when he was too weak to pull a cracker open by himself, at the end of life of his previous incarnation.

=== Casting ===
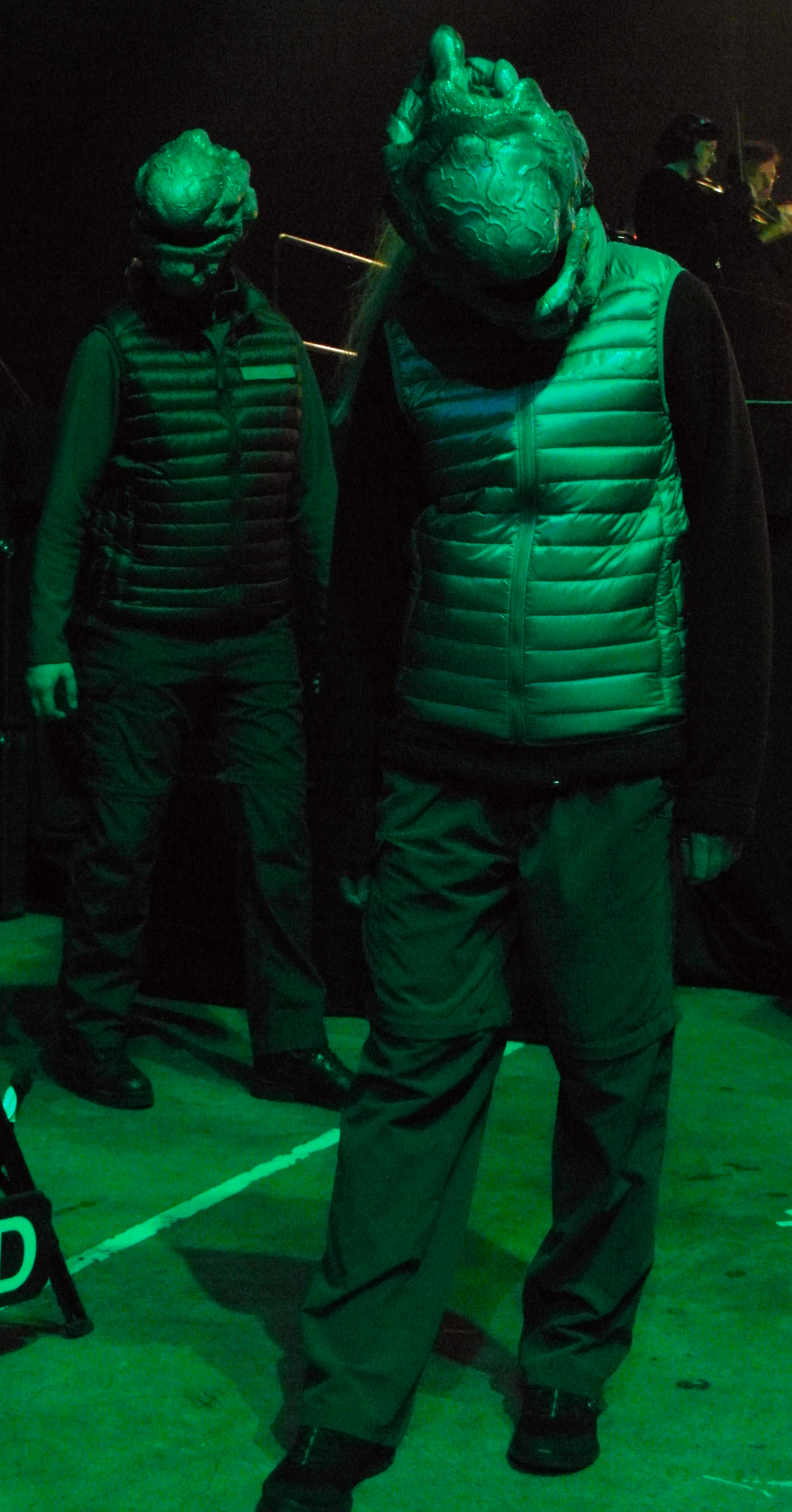
The Dream Crabs on display at the Doctor Who Symphonic Spectacular

In September 2014, announcements were made for a number of the guest cast, including Michael Troughton, Nick Frost, Nathan McMullen, Natalie Gumede and Faye Marsay. Michael Troughton is the younger son of Patrick Troughton, who played the Second Doctor from 1966 to 1969, and the younger brother of David Troughton, who appeared in The War Games, The Curse of Peladon, and "Midnight".

There were numerous rumours circulating that the special would be Jenna Coleman's last on the show. Coleman, along with Moffat, did not reveal if she was departing the series, instead insisted that people watch the episode to see whether she would be continuing into the ninth series. During the episode's climax, Clara decides to continue travelling with the Doctor, and Moffat revealed following the episode's airing that Coleman would appear in all of the ninth series. According to Moffat, Coleman was "to-ing and fro-ing" over her future in the series before ultimately deciding to continue.

In a 2015 interview with the fansite Blogtor Who, Moffat confirmed that he had initially written two endings for "Last Christmas". One of them would be Clara's exit from the show, and in the other she would stay for the next series. After Coleman decided to stay, Moffat kept the latter version of the script. Marsay's character of Shona was considered by Moffat to be Coleman's replacement as the companion for the ninth series, though nothing was fully formed. With Coleman electing to stay on the show, this would mark Marsay's only appearance. Elements of Shona were later reworked into the character of Bill Potts, who was the companion when Coleman left after series nine.

=== Filming ===
"Last Christmas" was directed by Paul Wilmshurst. He had previously directed two episodes of the previous series. The read-through for the episode took place on 3 September 2014, and filming began on 8 September in the BBC Roath Lock Studios in Cardiff. Scenes set at Clara's house were filmed at Vaendre Hall, a late nineteenth-century house in the Cardiff suburb of St Mellons. The scenes involving ice plains were filmed in a constructed set at RAF St Athan, a Royal Air Force base. Filming took approximately four weeks, ending on 3 October.

== Broadcast and reception ==
A preview was shown during the Children in Need charity event which featured Capaldi, Coleman, and Frost reprising their roles. Dan Starkey and Nathan McMullen appeared as elves. On 11 December 2014, the BBC released a 30-second trailer for the episode on YouTube.

"Last Christmas" was first broadcast on 25 December on BBC One. It was watched by a live audience of 6.34 million viewers, making it the eighth most watched broadcast for Christmas Day 2014, and the sixth most on BBC ONe. When including overnight ratings, it was seen by 8.28 million viewers. It had the worst Christmas Day rating since the show's return in 2005, down several million from the previous special, "The Time of the Doctor". It also got 1.07 million requests on BBC iPlayer for the nine-day period following Christmas. The episode received an Audience Appreciation Index of 82. However, despite the relatively weak British performance, it received a total of 2.62 million viewers on BBC America, beating the previous record established by "The Time of the Doctor", and became the most watched episode of the revived series in the channel's history.

=== Critical reception ===
Professional ratings
Aggregate scores
Source	Rating
Rotten Tomatoes (Average Rating)	8.8/10
Rotten Tomatoes (Tomatometer)	92%
Review scores
Source	Rating
The A.V. Club	A
SFX Magazine	5/5 stars
IndieWire	B+
IGN	8.8
Vulture	4/5 stars
Radio Times	3/5 stars
Digital Spy	4/5 stars
The Daily Telegraph	4/5 stars

"Last Christmas" received positive reviews. 92% of 13 critics gave the special a positive review, and an average rating of 8.8/10, according to Rotten Tomatoes. Particular praise was given to the Christmassy atmosphere, as well as Capaldi and Coleman's performance and the script.

Alasdair Wilkins of The A.V. Club awarded the episode the highest grade of the site, finding the script "inordinately clever" in making a at-first-glance "fluffy, silly Christmas special" scary. He also praised Capaldi's performance" for depicting "the unabashed joy" common to the previous Doctors, "never really" seen in series 8. Michael Hogan of The Daily Telegraph stated that it "had heart as well as head" with a festive special feel of "cockle-warming cosy glow". Writing for Digital Spy, Morgan Jeffery found the episode an "absolute cracker" that refused to be "light on substance". He believed the influences of Alien (1979) and Inception (2010) provided viewers with "both food for thought and fuel for our nightmares".

Simon Brew of Den of Geek heavily praised the episode and considered it an improvement over the previous Christmas special "The Time of the Doctor". He felt that "Last Christmas" capped off what he felt was "one of Doctor Who's strongest years in recent times". Matt Risley of IGN deemed the episode "Excellent", calling the episode "entertaining and satisfying" which combines "face-huggers with a Christmas miracle". Radio Times's Patrick Mulkern thought the storytelling clever, but guessable. He stated he was "peculiarly touched by Clara's sentiment of 'Every Christmas is last Christmas' and her admission that the Time Lord is her very own Father Christmas".

== Home media and soundtrack ==
"Last Christmas" was released on DVD and Blu-ray in the United Kingdom on 26 January 2015, in Australia on 28 January 2015, and in the United States on 17 February 2015. The ten Christmas specials between "The Christmas Invasion" and "Last Christmas" inclusive were released in a boxset titled Doctor Who – The Christmas Specials on 19 October 2015. Selected pieces of score from "Last Christmas", as composed by Murray Gold, were released on 18 May 2015 by Silva Screen Records as the third disc of the soundtrack covering series 8.
