= The Return of Doctor Mysterio =

264 – "The Return of Doctor Mysterio"
- Doctor Who episode
- Promotional poster

Cast
- Doctor: Peter Capaldi – Twelfth Doctor
- Companion: Matt Lucas – Nardole
- Others: Justin Chatwin – Grant Gordon / The Ghost; Charity Wakefield – Lucy Fletcher; Adetomiwa Edun – Mr Brock; Aleksandar Jovanovic – Dr Sim; Logan Hoffman – Young Grant; Daniel Lorente – Teen Grant; Sandra Teles – Reporter; Tanroh Ishida – Operator; Vaughn Johseph – Soldier

Production
- Directed by: Ed Bazalgette
- Written by: Steven Moffat
- Produced by: Peter Bennett
- Executive producers: Steven Moffat; Brian Minchin
- Music by: Murray Gold
- Running time: 60 minutes
- First broadcast: 25 December 2016

Chronology
← Preceded by "The Husbands of River Song"	Followed by → "The Pilot"

"The Return of Doctor Mysterio" is an episode of the British science fiction television series Doctor Who. First broadcast on BBC One on 25 December 2016, it is the twelfth Christmas special since the show's revival in 2005. It was written by Steven Moffat and directed by Ed Bazalgette.

The episode is set in New York City, and involves the Doctor and Nardole linking with journalist Lucy Fletcher (Charity Wakefield) and a superhero called The Ghost (Justin Chatwin) to combat brain-swapping aliens. The only episode of 2016, it stars Peter Capaldi as the Twelfth Doctor, and is the first to feature Nardole (Matt Lucas), who was introduced in the previous Christmas special "The Husbands of River Song", as his companion.

The episode was viewed by 7.83 million viewers in its BBC One broadcast and received generally positive reviews from critics.

== Plot ==
On Christmas Eve of 1992 in New York City, an 8-year-old named Grant wakes to find the Twelfth Doctor dangling outside the window of his home and helps him inside. The Doctor takes Grant to the rooftop and reveals he accidentally set off a device he was building; he enlists Grant to help complete it. However, Grant mistakenly swallows a wish-granting gemstone needed for the device, believing it to be medicine for a cold he has. He is granted his wish to be a superhero. The Doctor fixes the device and makes Grant promise to not use his new superpowers before he leaves.

The Doctor returns to New York in 2016, together with Nardole, to investigate Harmony Shoal, a multinational research company. They encounter a news reporter, Lucy Fletcher, who is conducting a similar investigation. The group discovers that Shoal is being secretly run by a group of living alien brains that transplant themselves into anyone they need for their plans. Dr. Sim, an employee already taken over, attempts to kill the group, when they are suddenly rescued by a masked superhero named the Ghost. He returns to an apartment and changes back into Grant, who works for Lucy as a nanny, just before she arrives.

Lucy prepares for an interview with the Ghost, while the Doctor and Nardole track down the alien's ship in orbit and board it via the TARDIS. There, they discover its reactor in a critical state; it would fall on New York, vaporising the whole city except for the Harmony Shoal building. World leaders would then take shelter in the company's other buildings in their own cities, believing Earth to be under attack, allowing the brains to take them over. Dr Sim lets slip the ship is to be dropped at a designated time; the Doctor forces its descent ahead of schedule.

Ghost and Lucy are captured by the brains during the interview. Ghost flies away, but returns as Grant to protect Lucy. Unable to change the ship's course during its descent, the Doctor sends Grant a message requesting his help. Grant manages to stop the alien's ship from crashing into the city, but reveals himself as the Ghost to Lucy in the process. Lucy is won over and Grant takes her in tow as he disposes of the ship. The Doctor alerts UNIT and they shut down Harmony Shoal.

== Production ==
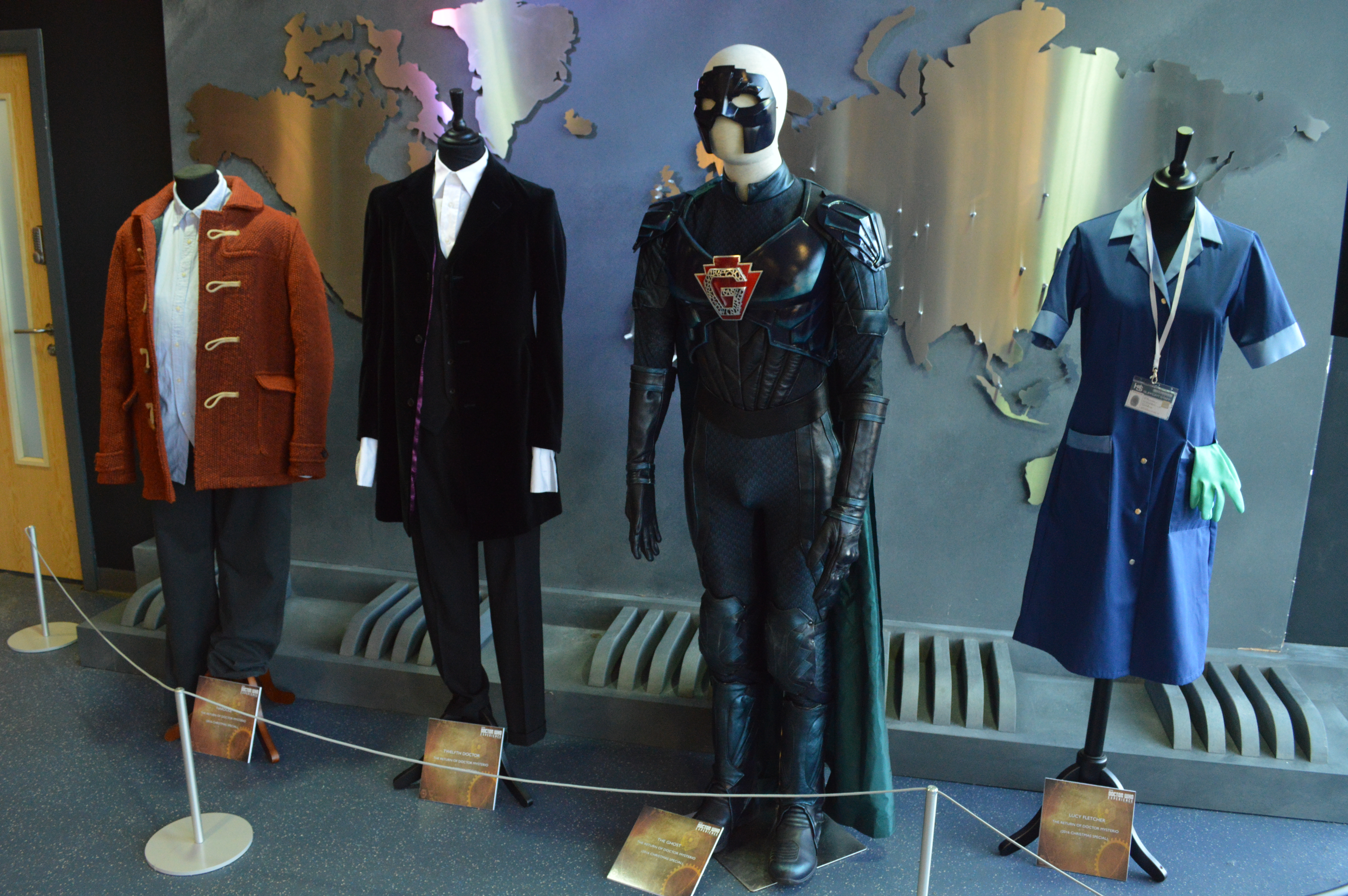
The costumes of Nardole, The Doctor, The Ghost and Lucy in this episode, on display at the Doctor Who Experience.

"The Return of Doctor Mysterio" was directed by Ed Bazalgette, who had previously directed the series 9 episodes "The Girl Who Died" and "The Woman Who Lived". The episode was filmed in Sofia, Bulgaria and Cardiff, Wales. Moffat had hoped to film on location in New York City, but ultimately fabricated sets were built for the episode to match the look of the city. Public tours of the set were held following the release of the episode.

=== Writing ===
"The Return of Doctor Mysterio" was written by Steven Moffat. The name of the episode was based on the title for Doctor Who in Mexico, Doctor Misterio. The story was developed as a loose sequel to the previous Christmas special, "The Husbands of River Song". While the episode served as the 2016 Christmas special, it featured very few Christmas elements. While planning for series 10, Moffat suggested that the Doctor should meet a superhero, executive producer Brian Minchin enjoyed the idea and proposed it for the Christmas special.

In an interview with Radio Times, Bazalgette stated that the script "barely changed" from the first and final drafts. It contains several references to comic books, most prominently Superman, of whom Grant has roughly the same standard powers, including flight, super-strength, super-speed, being bulletproof, and possessing X-ray vision. Peter Capaldi compared the episode's tone to that of the 1978 Superman film and its sequels.

=== Casting ===
Capaldi stars as the Twelfth Doctor. The episode is the first to feature Matt Lucas's Nardole as the Doctor's primary "companion". Lucas previously appeared as the character in a minor role in "The Husbands of River Song". Nardole was initially planned to be a one-off character, though after Lucas stated he was interested in returning to the role, Moffat wrote him into the episode as well as the following series. Justin Chatwin and Charity Wakefield guest star as Grant Gordon / The Ghost and Lucy Fletcher, respectively. Wakefield, being British, found it difficult to perform while doing an American accent.

== Release ==
Professional ratings
Aggregate scores
Source	Rating
Rotten Tomatoes (Average Score)	7.9
Rotten Tomatoes (Tomatometer)	89%
Review scores
Source	Rating
The A.V. Club	B−
SFX Magazine	3.5/5 stars
IGN	7.0
IndieWire	A−
PopMatters	5/10
Vulture	5/5 stars
Radio Times	5/5 stars
The Daily Telegraph	5/5 stars
SciFiNow	3/5 stars
The Times	4/5 stars

"The Return of Doctor Mysterio" was first broadcast in 2016 on Christmas Day on BBC One. In the United States and Canada the special was broadcast by BBC America and SPACE, respectively. The following day ABC, Prime, and Yle TV2 aired it in Australia, New Zealand, and Finland. BBC First aired the episode in South Africa and the Middle East on 27 December. In France, France 4 aired the episode on 18 March 2017.

The episode received cinema screenings in Australia and New Zealand on 26 December 2016, in Canada and Denmark on 26 and 28 December 2016, and in the United States on 27 and 29 December 2016. The screenings were accompanied by The Doctor: A New Kind of Hero, which featured Capaldi and Moffat discussing the Twelfth Doctor's character arc.

=== Ratings ===
The episode's had an official rating of 7.83 million viewers in the UK, making it the 8th most watched show on Christmas Day 2016. The overnight rating was 5.7 million. The episode received an Appreciation Index score of 82. It also received 1.7 million viewers on BBC America and became the networks top telecast of the year across all key demographics. It was the most talked about Christmas Day television programme on Facebook and Twitter.

=== Critical reception ===
"The Return of Doctor Mysterio" received generally positive reviews from critics. On Rotten Tomatoes, 89% of 18 reviews are positive for the episode, with an average rating of 7.9/10. The site's consensus reads "The Return of Doctor Mysterio is a welcome return of Doctor Who after a year's absence, with the added fun of seeing Steven Moffat take a heroic swing at his version of a Superman story."

The Daily Telegraph gave a positive review of five out of five stars, praising the performance of Peter Capaldi and describing the episode as having a fun "classic feel". Andrew Billen writing in The Times gave the programme four stars out of a possible five, writing that Capaldi was at his warmest, and that Matt Lucas as Nardole brought a "panto brio to an already exuberant episode". The Guardian gave a positive review of The Return of Doctor Mysterio, naming the episode "Cosmic baddies are inserting alien brains into world leaders’ heads in the Christmas special. It's timely, top-of-the-tree fun – and Peter Capaldi and Matt Lucas are a pantomime treat".

IGN's said Scott Collura gave the episode a 7 out of 10, writing that the episode was a "lightweight entry in the Twelfth Doctor's oeuvre, which considering the events of last season isn't necessarily a bad thing. But the different elements of the episode don't come together as smoothly as they could, and the emotional through line for the Doctor is treated mostly as an afterthought". The A.V. Club's Alasdair Wilkins described the special as "jolly" and "goofy".

== Home media ==
"The Return of Doctor Mysterio" was released on DVD and Blu-ray in the United Kingdom on 23 January 2017, with a U.S. release following on 21 February 2017. The episode was released on SteelBook available exclusively on Amazon. The discs contained The Doctor: A New Kind of Hero and Doctor Who Extra: The Return of Doctor Mysterio, a behind the scenes documentary, as bonus features.

== Bibliography ==
- Ainsworth, John (2018). "Doctor Who - The Complete History: The Return of Doctor Mysterio and The Pilot". Doctor Who - The Complete History. Vol. 85. Panini Comics.
- Billen, Andrew (26 December 2016). "Forget the Midwives, the Doctor was the real star". The Times. No. 72103. p. 14. ISSN 0140-0460.
