= The Husbands of River Song =

263 – "The Husbands of River Song"
- Doctor Who episode
- Promotional poster

Cast
- Doctor: Peter Capaldi – Twelfth Doctor
- Companion: Alex Kingston – River Song
- Others: Matt Lucas – Nardole; Greg Davies – King Hydroflax; Rowan Polonski – Flemming; Robert Curtis – Scratch; Chris Lew Kum Hoi – Alphonse; Phillip Rhys – Ramone; Anthony Cozens – Concierge; Nicolle Smartt – Receptionist; Liam Cook – King Hydroflax's body; Nonso Anozie – Voice of Hydroflax

Production
- Directed by: Douglas Mackinnon
- Written by: Steven Moffat
- Produced by: Nikki Wilson
- Executive producers: Steven Moffat; Brian Minchin
- Music by: Murray Gold
- Running time: 56 minutes
- First broadcast: 25 December 2015

Chronology
← Preceded by "Hell Bent"	Followed by → "The Return of Doctor Mysterio"

"The Husbands of River Song" is an episode of the British science fiction television series Doctor Who. First broadcast on BBC One on 25 December 2015, it is the eleventh Christmas special since the show's revival in 2005. It was written by Steven Moffat and directed by Douglas Mackinnon. The episode marks the return of Alex Kingston as River Song, making her first appearance alongside Peter Capaldi's Twelfth Doctor and her last on-screen appearance to date. This also features the first appearance of Nardole, who would become a companion starting from the next episode.

In the episode, the alien time traveller known as the Doctor encounters River Song on the colony of Mendorax Dellora in 5343, with one of her husbands, Hydroflax (Greg Davies), who has an invaluable diamond lodged in his brain. Outsmarting Hydroflax and his worshippers, the Doctor and River have a date at the Singing Towers of Darillium, which the Doctor knows will be the last meeting before her death.

After the dark ending of series 9, Moffat wrote "The Husbands of River Song" to have a lighter tone. The episode was filmed in September 2015. In addition to airing on Christmas Day, the episode received cinema airings in several countries. In the UK, the episode was watched by 7.69 million viewers. "The Husband of River Song" was met with generally positive reviews; critics particularly praised the chemistry between Capaldi and Kingston, but were unsure of the comedic tone of the episode.

== Plot ==
In 5343, on the human colony of Mendorax Dellora, the Doctor is mistaken by a servant, Nardole, for a surgeon hired by River Song to attend to her dying husband, King Hydroflax, a cyborg. River fails to recognise the Doctor and tells him to decapitate Hydroflax so she can claim the most valuable diamond in the universe, which has become lodged in the king's brain. However, they are interrupted by Hydroflax, who overhears them. He detaches his head from his mechanical body and orders it to kill them. Ramone, another of River's husbands, teleport her, the Doctor, and Hydroflax's head outside. Hydroflax's body decapitates him to use Nardole's head as its own, believing Nardole to have information about River.

River tracks down the TARDIS, but its safeguards prevent it from taking off when it detects that Hydroflax's head and body, although separated, are still linked. Left behind, Hydroflax's body follows a homing beacon emitted by his head. Using Ramone, it forces its way inside, and they arrive at their destination starship. River reveals she intends to sell the diamond to a buyer, but he is a member of the Shoal of the Winter Harmony and has secretly filled the meeting point with his compatriots who worship Hydroflax and seek the diamond in his honour. The maître d', Flemming, stops them from escaping and promises the Doctor's head to Hydroflax using River as bait. Hydroflax's body destroys its head, leaving only the diamond.

Flemming interrogates River for the Doctor's whereabouts. She explains that although she loves the Doctor, she believes he does not reciprocate—but the Doctor reveals himself. As the ship is hit by a meteor strike, River escapes with the diamond. River discovers they are heading toward the planet Darillium, which the Doctor remembers is where she spends her last night with him before her death. Realising they cannot save the ship, River and the Doctor flee into the TARDIS.

The Doctor gives a man the diamond to fund the construction of a restaurant overlooking Darillium's Singing Towers. When River awakens, the Doctor gives River a sonic screwdriver. As the pair admire the Singing Towers, River asks whether this is their rumoured last night together. The Doctor insists there is no way to avoid the end but refuses to tell River the future. He reveals that one night on Darillium lasts for twenty-four years, allowing them to enjoy a happy romance together.

== Production ==
=== Writing ===
Showrunner Steven Moffat originally planned "The Husbands of River Song" to be his last episode for his run of Doctor Who, but it became clear he would stay on because his successor, Chris Chibnall, was busy with the third season of Broadchurch. With the emotional departure of Jenna Coleman as longtime companion Clara Oswald, Moffat did not want a new major character for the episode, and writing River Song one last time would be Moffat's goodbye to the series. The episode was intended to be a lighter, comedic romp than the previous series. The first partial draft of the episode was dated 3 August 2015, with the conclusion of the first draft dated 19 August. The shooting script was the third draft and issued on 27 August. Moffat could not decide between the titles of "The Husband of River Song" and "The Husbands of River Song"; he discussed the final decision with Doctor Who Magazine editor Tom Spilsbury.

Setting the episode where River does not recognize the Doctor allowed Moffat to play around with the characters in ways unseen before, such as what River is like without the Doctor around and giving the Doctor his own "bigger on the inside" reaction to the TARDIS. The episode fills in a part of River Song's timeline, the singing towers of Darillium, previously described in "Silence in the Library" and "Forest of the Dead". Moffat was satisfied that by depicting this adventure directly before, he created a "loop" that encompassed his time writing on the show. The episode makes multiple references to River's description of Darillium in "Silence in the Library" and "Forest of the Dead", such as the Doctor's new haircut, best suit, and tears.

As for the villain of Hydroflax, Moffat commented, "I wanted to keep it simple, for Christmas: a big, bad, rather stupid man, who isn't much of a threat to anything because he's so thick".

=== Casting ===
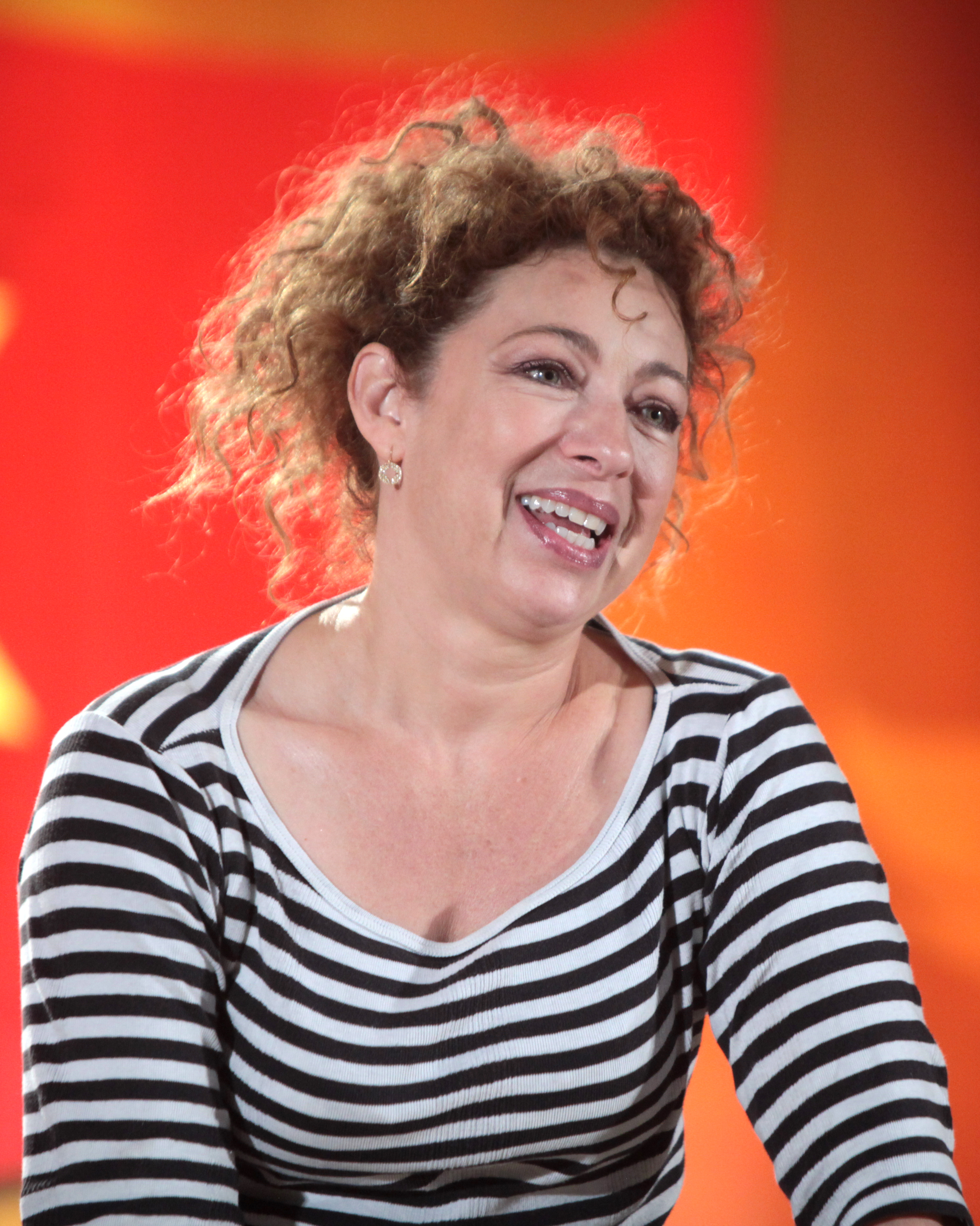
Alex Kingston reprised the role of River Song in "The Husbands of River Song", her final appearance to date.

In September 2015, it was announced that Alex Kingston would reprise the role of recurring character River Song for the first time since the 2013 episode "The Name of the Doctor". Moffat "had sort of thought we were done with River" but had been encouraged to bring her back by former showrunner Russell T Davies, who wanted to see her opposite Capaldi. Kingston said she did not expect to return.

In November, it was revealed that the special's guest cast would include Greg Davies as King Hydroflax and Matt Lucas as Nardole. Lucas was a fan of the show and Davies accepted the offer without reading the script, describing the role as "one of those jobs that validates the career to my own mother". Lucas shot the episode in between attending rehearsals for a BBC Cymru production of A Midsummer Night's Dream, where he played Nick Bottom. He added comedic ad-libs during shooting.

=== Filming ===
The read through for the episode took place on 31 August 2015, with the special being filmed between 1 and 26 September 2015. Location filming took place in the Leigh Court Business Centre mansion, which was used for Harmony and Redemption. The street in which the TARDIS lands was a redressing of the set of "Face the Raven", and the company Snow Business provided winter effects. The final scene's Darillium set was minimal and used wind machines. A location in St Athan was used for snowy fields, and a quarry in Aberthaw and Aberthaw Cement Works represented a crash site. The rest of the episode was filmed in BBC's Roath Lock Studios.

Multiple professionals operated the headless Hydroflax rig throughout production. A cast of Davies's head was made to create prop Hydroflax heads that could be carried around set. For Hydroflax's head to be sitting on the TARDIS console, a dummy section of the console was created so Davies could sit on set and deliver his lines through a hole in the panel. Davies, while positive, described performing the role: "It definitely wins the award for the most uncomfortable shoot I've ever done, yes. There were several times when I was trapped under a table as a floating head. Even inside the robot costume... it's not a place where a man can relax."

Aside from one change in the closing credits, the episode finished post-production on 15 December—a day before a preview screening.

== Broadcast and reception ==
"The Husbands of River Song" received two preview screenings at the British Film Institute in London on 16 December 2015. The afternoon screening was attended by schoolchildren and the evening screening was followed by a panel featuring Peter Capaldi, Alex Kingston, Greg Davies, and Steven Moffat.

Airing on 25 December, the episode had an official rating of 7.69 million viewers. The chart position was seventh for Christmas Day. The overnight rating was 5.77 million with a 29.4% share of the total TV audience at 5.15pm. It received an Appreciation Index score of 82 out of 100.

=== Cinemas ===
The episode had a cinema release in Belarus, Kazakhstan, Russia, and Ukraine on 25 and 26 December and in the United States on 28 and 29 December. The cinema releases in the U.S. included an additional interview with Alex Kingston and a behind-the-scenes featurette.

=== Critical reception ===
Professional ratings
Aggregate scores
Source	Rating
Rotten Tomatoes (Average Score)	7.6
Rotten Tomatoes (Tomatometer)	95%
Review scores
Source	Rating
The A.V. Club	B
IGN	8.4
New York Magazine	4/5 stars
Paste Magazine	8.2
PopMatters	7/10
Radio Times	3/5 stars
SciFiNow	4/5 stars
SFX Magazine	3/5 stars
TV Fanatic	4/5 stars

"The Husbands of River Song" received positive reviews. It holds an approval rating of 95% on Rotten Tomatoes, based on 19 reviews, and an average score of 7.6. The critic's consensus reads "Doctor Who delivers a Christmas special that perfectly balances silliness and heart".

The A.V. Club's Alasdair Wilkins gave the episode a grade of a B. He described it as "absolutely a weird episode, and it probably doesn't have quite enough genius and emotion in the end to quite justify the oddness of its construction". Dan Martin of The Guardian praised the return of Kingston and her chemistry opposite Capaldi. IGN gave the episode a score of 8.4 out of 10, describing it as "a nice, fun, wacky change of pace that still manages to touch that sweet spot of emotional resonance that the Twelfth Doctor has done so well this year". He described Capaldi and Kingston as having "great comedic chemistry". Paste Magazine's Mark Rozeman, giving the episode a score of 8.2 out of 10, noted that the lighter tone was welcome after the dark ending of series 9, but that it made "the hour feel a bit slight and lacking anything to really latch onto". He praised the episode as a "poignant swansong" to River Song that "sends her off in a blaze of glory, highlighting the fantastic energy and charm that Alex Kingston brought to the role".

Both Patrick Mulkern of Radio Times and Nick Setchfield of SFX gave the episode three out of five stars. Mulkern wrote, "It's hard to pinpoint what is lacking from this episode but it feels as though, with an extra twist, funnier escapades and sharper banter for the duo, this could have been a classy screwball comedy". Setchfield found the setting "a little vague around the edges" and Lucas and Davies's characters also lacking depth, but he praised Capaldi's comedy and "cracking rapport and energy" with Kingston.

=== Accolades ===
At the 42nd Saturn Awards, the episode won the Best Television Presentation and Alex Kingston was nominated for Best Guest Star on Television. In a 2023 Doctor Who Magazine poll, "The Husbands of River Song" was voted the ninth best Twelfth Doctor story out of a total of 35.

== Home media ==
"The Husbands of River Song" was released on DVD and Blu-ray on 25 January 2016 in Region 2, 27 January 2016 in Region 4, and 23 February 2016 in Region 1. A complete box set for the ninth series, including "The Husbands of River Song", was released on 7 March 2016 in Region 2 and 5 April 2016 in Region 1. The episode was also included on The Complete Peter Capaldi Years North American boxset, released on 13 February 2018.

== Soundtrack ==
Pieces of score from this episode, as composed by Murray Gold, comprise the entire fourth disc of the ninth series's four-CD soundtrack, which was released on 27 April 2018 by Silva Screen Records.

== Bibliography ==
- Wright, Mark, ed. (2018). "Hell Bent and The Husbands of River Song". Doctor Who: The Complete History. 80 (84). London: Panini Comics, Hachette Partworks.
