= Nardole =

Fictional character from Doctor Who

- Doctor Who character
- Matt Lucas as Nardole
- First appearance: "The Husbands of River Song" (2015)
- Last appearance: "Twice Upon a Time" (2017)
- Created by: Steven Moffat
- Portrayed by: Matt Lucas
- Duration: 2015–2017

In-universe information
- Species: Humanoid alien / Cyborg
- Gender: Male
- Affiliation: River Song; Twelfth Doctor

Nardole is a fictional character created by Steven Moffat and portrayed by Matt Lucas in the long-running British science fiction television series Doctor Who. He is a companion of the Twelfth Doctor, an incarnation of the alien time traveller known as The Doctor, played by Peter Capaldi. In-universe, Nardole is a humanoid extraterrestrial being who serves as an employee to the Doctor's wife, River Song. He is decapitated (but not killed) and forcibly integrated into an alien cyborg body, but has his body rebuilt by the Twelfth Doctor. He becomes a full-time companion following the episode "The Return of Doctor Mysterio", and subsequently appears in his role as a companion and supporting character throughout the show's tenth series and then makes a cameo in the 2017 Christmas special "Twice Upon a Time". Lucas briefly reprised the role in a short written in support of the Black Lives Matter movement.

Nardole was originally a one-off comic relief character, but Lucas requested to come back to the series, with Moffat agreeing and bringing Nardole back. Nardole gained further character work as a result of the character's return, with the character now serving a more serious role within the series. Moffat designed Nardole to serve as a butler-like character who did not want to be the Doctor's servant. Nardole would frequently disagree with the Doctor, though the two grow to gain respect for each other as the series progresses. Lucas originally believed the character would return for only a few episodes, but that was soon expanded to re-appearances throughout the entire tenth series of the show.

News of Nardole's return following his debut episode "The Husbands of River Song" was divisive, with many fans being surprised with the news while others were upset due to the character's over-exaggerated comic relief nature in the episode. Lucas stated in his memoir that fans eventually came around to the character, with The Daily Telegraph highlighting his dynamic with the Doctor and overall presence. His status as a cyborg was the subject of analysis, with comparisons being made to how Nardole compared to other robotic characters in the series.

== Appearances ==
Nardole is introduced in the 2015 Christmas special, "The Husbands of River Song", as the employee of the Doctor's wife, River Song (Alex Kingston). In the course of the episode, he is decapitated, with his head ending up as part of a cyborg body. In the subsequent Christmas episode, "The Return of Doctor Mysterio" (2016), Nardole appears again as the Doctor's companion. The Doctor had rebuilt Nardole's original body, making him a cyborg, but it is unclear how cybernetic Nardole is.

For the tenth series, which follows the two specials, Nardole remains the Doctor's assistant. When the series begins with "The Pilot" (2017), the pair were based in a university in Bristol, where Nardole attempts to keep the Doctor to his oath to guard an alien vault beneath the university. He eventually ends up joining the Doctor and his new companion Bill Potts on their adventures. During the events of the series finale "The Doctor Falls", Nardole is forced to stay behind to guide the humans on board a colony ship to safety from the Cybermen, and he subsequently spends the rest of his life aboard the ship, thus marking his departure from the series. He then appears in "Twice Upon a Time", where his memories are revealed to have been downloaded to a program called the Testimony, allowing him to say a final goodbye to the dying Twelfth Doctor. Lucas later reprised his role as Nardole in 2020 in a short released as part of a mini-episode written in support of the Black Lives Matter movement.

== Casting and development ==
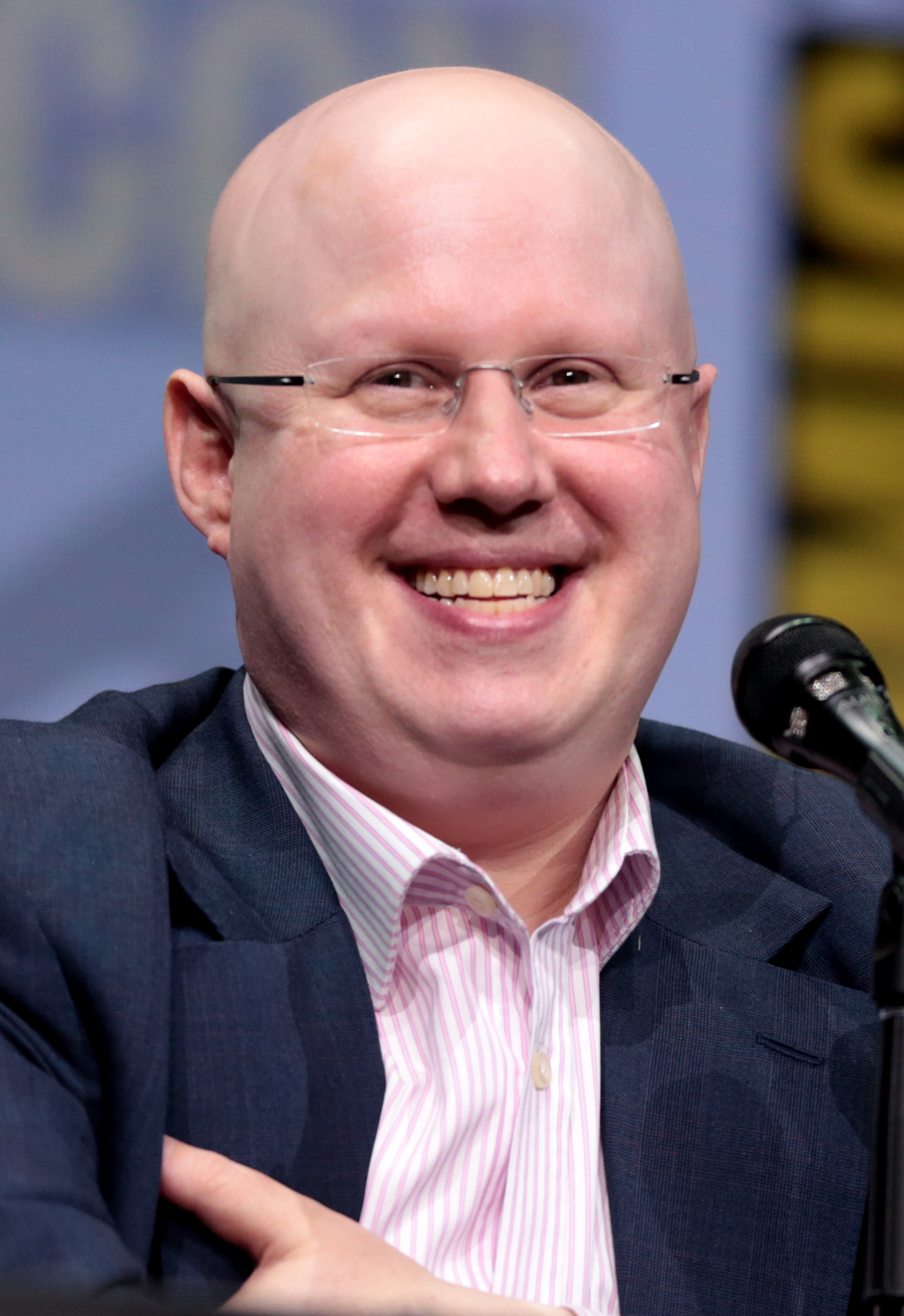
Comedian Matt Lucas (pictured) portrays Nardole in the series

In November 2015, it was announced that Matt Lucas would appear in "The Husbands of River Song" as a guest character named Nardole. Lucas had previously voiced the Cylinder and Jelloid in the 2001 Doctor Who audio drama The One Doctor. Nardole initially appeared in a comedic role, with Lucas having hammed the comedy up under the assumption it was a one-off role. Following his initial appearance, Lucas asked showrunner Steven Moffat if he could return to the series. Moffat, seeing that a high-profile actor like Lucas was willing to pass up greater career prospects to appear in the series, decided to take Lucas up on his offer and brought Nardole back to the series.

On 14 June 2016, it was confirmed that Nardole would return in the 2016 Christmas special, "The Return of Doctor Mysterio", as the Doctor's companion and stayed in the role throughout the tenth series. Lucas stated in his memoir that he was originally only set to appear in three subsequent episodes, but Nardole's role continued to expand, and eventually he was intended to appear in every episode of the tenth series. Nardole's companion status made him the first full-time alien companion of the revived series and the first in the series in over 30 years.

Nardole's character changed as a result of his further appearances, with Lucas opining in an interview that "you couldn't go through a whole series with him being as cartoonish as he was in The Husbands of River Song". Moffat stated that Nardole was now "slyer, more devious, more useful" than he had been in his previous appearance, while co-star Peter Capaldi stated that Nardole's character and Lucas's performance were more "complex" than Nardole's prior appearance. Moffat wanted the Doctor to have a "butler" who did not want to be a butler, which he felt was funny and would contrast with the character of the Twelfth Doctor. Moffat had Nardole fulfill this role in the series. Lucas explained in an interview with Entertainment Weekly that the character served the Doctor like a valet, and that while Nardole would disagree with the Doctor, he knew he could not push his boundaries. Nardole was made to bicker with the Doctor, often disagreeing with the Doctor's ideas. Lucas stated that Nardole wanted to live a quiet life and focus on the task of guarding the vault that he and the Doctor had been given. Lucas stated that the dynamic between the Doctor, Nardole and Bill developed throughout the series, with Bill and Nardole finding common ground as Nardole grows to appreciate Bill more, while the Doctor grows to respect Nardole's skills and presence further.

Lucas stated in his memoir that he would be allowed to improvise once a few takes were done, with several lines improvised by him making the final cut. Lucas stated that he was unaware of many plot developments as it kept him less stressed while working. Due to the complicated nature of the episode scripts, many of Lucas's conversations with his co-stars involved them attempting to determine how to interpret a script and its content, especially due to the absence of episode writers on set. Lucas was busy during filming with writing his book, which he had taken on while under the initial assumption of Nardole only appearing a few episodes. Lucas stated that he had time only for learning his lines, writing the book, eating and sleeping while he was filming for the show. Lucas explained that while filming could sometimes be difficult, he greatly enjoyed the experience of being on the show. Lucas's favourite episode whilst working on the series was "Oxygen" due to the episode's atmosphere and commentary.

== Reception ==
Nardole's initial re-appearance was a surprise to fans, who had assumed Nardole would be a one-off character in the series. Lucas revealed in his memoir that many fans expressed confusion over the re-appearance of Nardole, with many being upset, especially as a result of how over the top Nardole's comedic role in his debut appearance was. In an interview, Lucas stated that he believed this hesitancy came down to his history as a comedic actor. Nardole was initially a divisive figure among fans of the series as a result of his re-appearance, though Catherine Gee from The Daily Telegraph believed that Nardole's "admonishing presence" helped the Twelfth Doctor bring out a "cheeky" side to his character. Gee also wrote that Nardole's presence reminded both the Doctor and the audience of the Doctor's role in guarding the vault without forcing a greater emotional burden on the Doctor's character. Lucas stated in his memoir that fans eventually came around to his role in the series and enjoyed Nardole's comedic role in the show.

Nardole was described by the book Robots in Popular Culture: Androids and Cyborgs in the American Imagination as providing a light-hearted comedic role in the series, which contrasted with other robotic characters like the Cybermen and Daleks, who tended to serve antagonistic roles. The book also described Nardole as a mysterious character within the series, as the nature of how cybernetic the character was is made uncertain. Nardole's role in the series was described by the Popular Culture Studies Journal as continuing the trend in the series of robotic characters acting as secondary to the main character. The book wrote that despite Nardole being a main character in the series, he was not considered as close of a friend to the Doctor as human characters in the series.
