= Twelfth Doctor =

Fictional character from Doctor Who

The Doctor
The Twelfth Doctor
- Doctor Who character
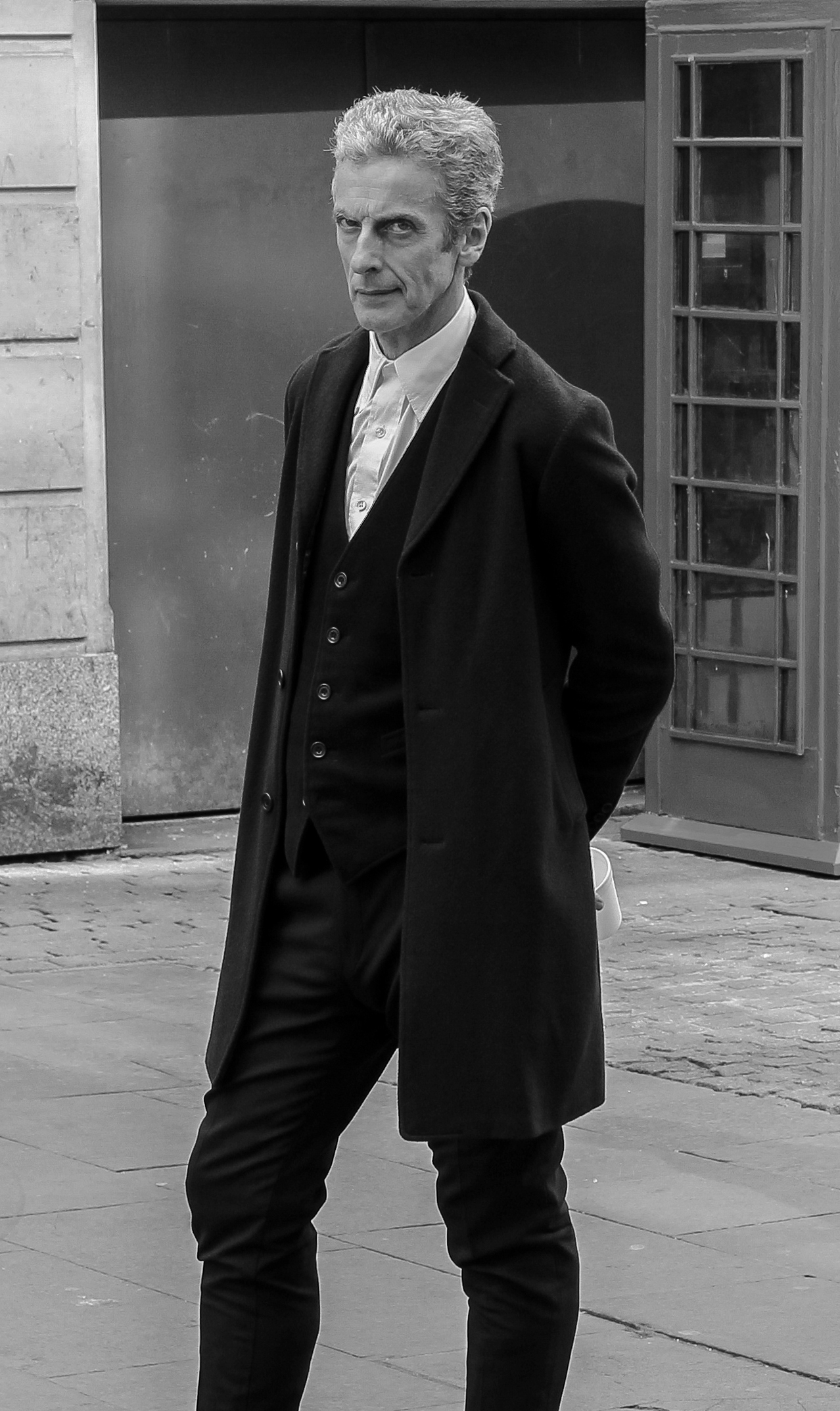
- Peter Capaldi as the Twelfth Doctor
- First regular appearance: "Deep Breath" (2014)
- Last regular appearance: "Twice Upon a Time" (2017)
- Introduced by: Steven Moffat
- Portrayed by: Peter Capaldi
- Preceded by: Matt Smith (Eleventh Doctor)
- Succeeded by: Jodie Whittaker (Thirteenth Doctor)

Information
- Tenure: 23 August 2014 – 25 December 2017
- No of series: 3
- Appearances: 35 stories (40 episodes)
- Companions: Clara Oswald; River Song; Nardole; Bill Potts
- Chronology: Series 8 (2014); Series 9 (2015); Series 10 (2017)

The Twelfth Doctor is an incarnation of the Doctor, the protagonist of the British science fiction television series Doctor Who. He is portrayed by Scottish actor Peter Capaldi in three series as well as four specials. As with previous incarnations of the Doctor, the character has also appeared in other Doctor Who spin-offs, both during and after the character's televised appearances.

The Doctor is an extraterrestrial being from a humanoid species known as Time Lords from the planet Gallifrey. The Doctor travels through space and time using a time travelling spaceship called the TARDIS and frequently travels with companions. When a Time Lord is fatally injured or weakened by old age, their cells regenerate into a new body, while they retain their memories, their personality changes. The different portrayals of the Doctor function as distinct stages within a single, continuous narrative. Capaldi's portrayal of the Doctor is initially a spiky, brusque, contemplative, and pragmatic character who conceals his emotions in the course of making tough and sometimes ruthless decisions. Very quickly, however, he becomes extremely humanitarian and compassionate, and more openly showcases his selflessness. Preceded in regeneration by the Eleventh Doctor, he is followed by the Thirteenth Doctor.

This incarnation's companions include school teacher Clara Oswald, who also travelled with his previous incarnation, for his first two series; and for his final series, university canteen assistant Bill Potts and humanoid cyborg Nardole. He also made a guest appearance in the Doctor Who spin-off series Class, appearing in the show's first episode.

== Development ==
=== Casting ===
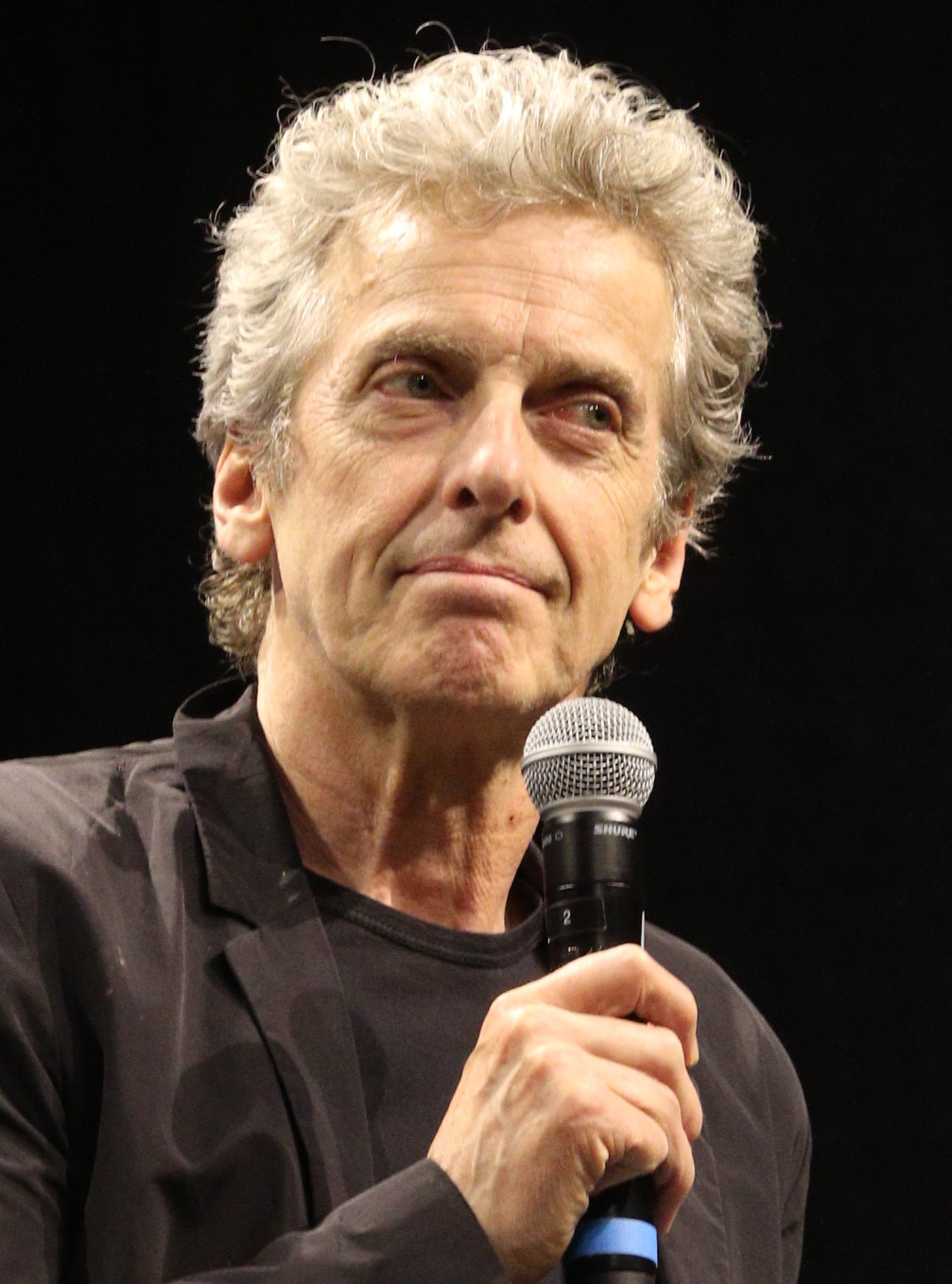
Peter Capaldi portrayed the Twelfth Doctor

Matt Smith, who played the Eleventh Doctor, publicly announced his departure from Doctor Who on 1 June 2013, triggering extensive media speculation on the subject of his successor. On 3 August 2013, bookmakers William Hill suspended betting when Capaldi became the five to six favourite to be cast. Capaldi's casting was revealed on 4 August during a live broadcast on BBC One, titled Doctor Who Live: The Next Doctor. The live show, hosted by Zoe Ball, was watched by an average of 6.27 million in the UK, and was also simulcast in the United States, Canada and Australia.

While Capaldi was the first choice for the role, other actors were also approached in case Capaldi turned the offer down. Ben Daniels, who was an early favourite following the announcement of Matt Smith's departure, said that he had been approached with a view to assessing whether he would be interested in playing the Doctor, with his name remaining as a potential contender until just before the live BBC broadcast.

Doctor Who head writer and executive producer Steven Moffat said that Capaldi "briefly flicked through [his] mind" while casting the Eleventh Doctor, but that he dismissed the idea, thinking he was not right for the part at the time. Ben Stephenson, the BBC's drama commissioner, said that Capaldi was suggested months before the August revelation and that a secret audition was held at Moffat's home. Capaldi prepared for the audition by downloading old Doctor Who scripts from the Internet and practising in front of a mirror. He discovered he had been given the part during filming for Adrian Hodges' The Musketeers in Prague; after missing a call from his agent, Capaldi rang back to be greeted with "Hello, Doctor!" At 55 years old when originally cast, Capaldi was only a few months younger than William Hartnell (the First Doctor) was when he was cast in the role, making Capaldi the oldest actor since Hartnell to star as the Doctor and the third oldest to portray the character. Moffat felt that an older actor would work best following the youngest actor, as it would both provide a change and lessen comparisons. He commented, "I can absolutely believe that the strange old-young Matt Smith will turn into the strange young-old Peter Capaldi."

Capaldi had previously appeared playing other roles in the Doctor Who franchise. He portrayed Lobus Caecilius in the 2008 episode "The Fires of Pompeii" and John Frobisher in Children of Earth, the 2009 serial of the Doctor Who spin-off Torchwood. Moffat has stated that he plans on explaining over time why there are three characters in the Doctor Who universe with the same appearance; his predecessor Russell T Davies had once explained to him a theory for the first two, and upon Capaldi's casting assured Moffat that the explanation would still work. This situation was alluded to in "Deep Breath", when a confused Doctor is reminded of Caecilius when he examines his face in a mirror. In "The Girl Who Died", it is explained that the Doctor chose Caecilius' face to remind himself that he is the Doctor, and that he can always save people. While not explained in the episode, Moffat later said that he also shares a face with John Frobisher as Frobisher is Caecilius's descendant, and represents the end of Caecilius's bloodline, referencing the Doctor's "eternal battle with doom and destiny." Capaldi's casting marks the second time an actor has previously appeared in the series and then been cast as an incarnation of the Doctor, the first being Colin Baker.

Capaldi briefly appears in the 50th anniversary special. Moffat stated that it was his "plan from the start" that all the Doctors would fly in to save Gallifrey, and he knew there would be a new one at that time. He wrote it before knowing who would be cast. Capaldi filmed his appearance on 3 October 2013, long after principal photography for the special had ended, and the same day he filmed his debut scene for "The Time of the Doctor".

Capaldi kept his native Scottish accent for the role. Speaking on his decision, he said he did it so he could feel closer to the character. A handful of tweets were reported in September 2014 in which it was claimed that some viewers struggled to understand Capaldi. A speech coach and linguistics expert both suggested that any problems with understanding Capaldi had more to do with delivery than accent.

=== Departure ===
On 30 January 2017, Capaldi confirmed that the tenth series would be his last; Moffat had announced earlier in January 2016 that he was handing over his position as showrunner to Chris Chibnall following the tenth series' broadcast in 2017. Regarding his decision to leave, Capaldi stated that despite his tremendous love for the show, he was unsure if he would be able to deliver at his best performance if he remained in the role for too long.

== Character ==
=== Costume ===
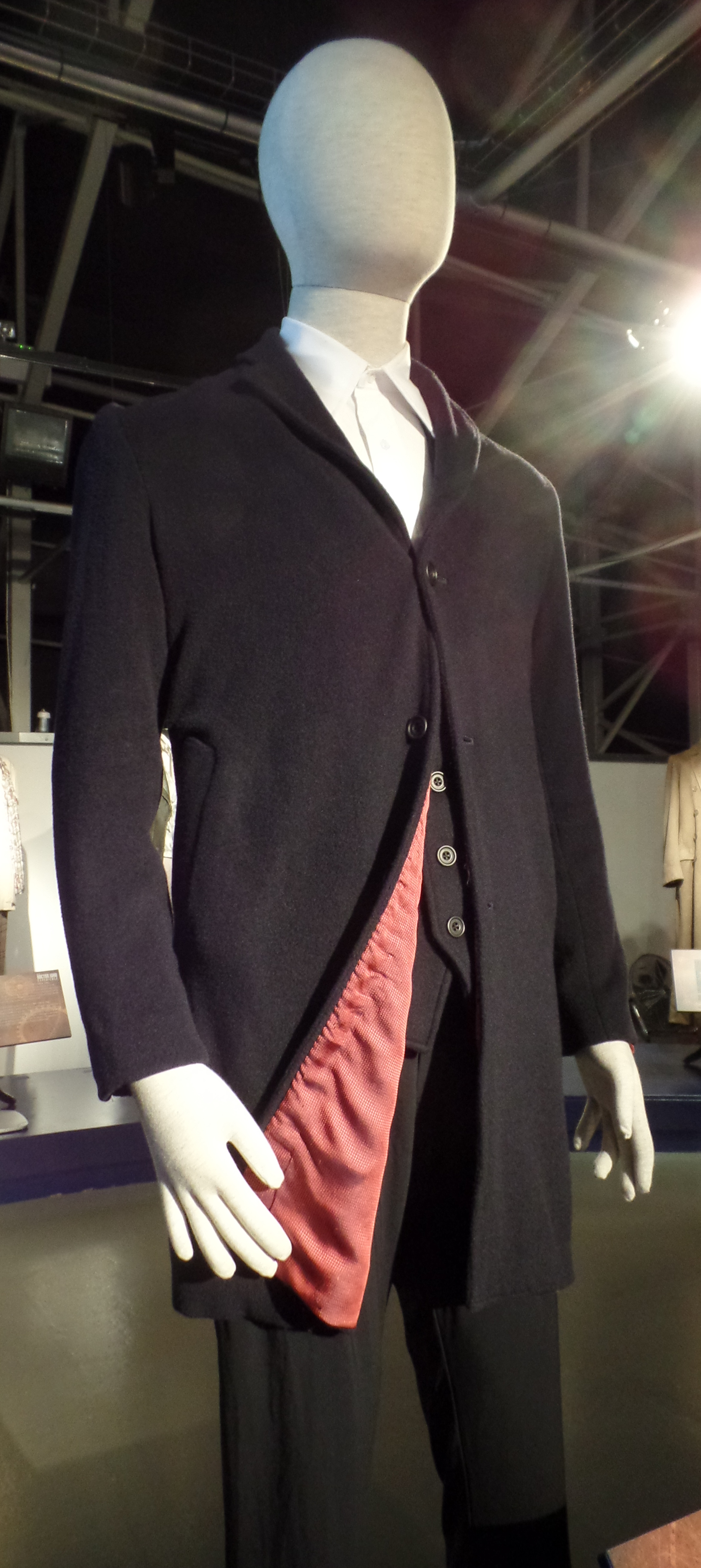
The 12th Doctor's costume, on display at the Doctor Who Experience.

The Twelfth Doctor's general outfit consists of a navy blue Crombie coat with a crimson lining, dark blue trousers, a long collared white shirt buttoned to the top, a black cardigan or waistcoat, and brogue boots. His shirt varies from episode to episode, with a navy shirt, a dark purple shirt and a black shirt with white polka dots appearing, as well as a black holey jumper, all being worn under his coat in his first series. He also wears a hoodie over his jumper as of series nine, over his T-shirt, all being worn under his coat. In "Time Heist", the Doctor describes his costume as "hoping for minimalism, but I think I came up with magician."

The look was created by Doctor Who costume designer Howard Burden. His design was described as "No frills, no scarfs, no messing, just 100% rebel Time Lord." Capaldi said that the costume took a long time to find. The reason he settled on his final costume was that, "I think it's quite a hard look. I always wanted him to be in black – I always just saw the Doctor in dark colours. Not tweed," in reference to his immediate predecessor's original costume. "Matt's a really young cool guy – he can wear anything, but I wanted to strip it back and be very stark." Moffat described the look as "A stick-insect sort of thing". He also said that Clara calls him "a grey-haired stick-insect at one point". Capaldi also stated that he chose the Twelfth Doctor's costume so fans of the show who enjoy cosplay could easily emulate it without going to great expense. Writing for Radio Times, fashion columnist Anna Fielding described it as "a classic early skinhead look" and linked it to Capaldi's history as a punk musician.

Capaldi's costume has varied in some episodes. In "Mummy on the Orient Express" he dons a period-appropriate tuxedo and a black cravat. In "The Magician's Apprentice", he wears Ray-Ban sunglasses (later revealed in "The Witch's Familiar" to be a wearable version of his sonic screwdriver), a T-shirt and plaid baggy trousers along with the hoodie and Crombie coat. In "Face the Raven", the Twelfth Doctor sports a crimson velvet variant of his Crombie coat. After briefly ditching it in "Hell Bent", Clara comments that it made him look more 'doctory'. At the end of the episode, he dons the crimson coat in honour of her and is given a new Sonic Screwdriver by the TARDIS. In the ending segment of "The Husbands of River Song", the Doctor again dons the same tuxedo and period dress worn in "Mummy on the Orient Express". In Capaldi's final season, the most variations were seen on the Doctor's costume. In the first episode of the season, Capaldi donned a new black velvet frock coat with blue lining and peak lapels. This coat appeared several times throughout the season. The navy crombie coat returned ("Oxygen") as well as the red velvet crombie. Another addition to the Doctor's wardrobe occurs mid-season with the introduction of a grey distressed linen frock coat. The final look that Capaldi had for his tenure as the Doctor was a navy velvet coat with red lining.

=== Characterisation ===
First and foremost, he's not human. So I think he struggles to create a version of himself that humans find easy to be around. He's always trying to save the universe, so if he upsets someone, that has to come with the territory. But then later on, he probably gets a bit worried and wishes he could go back and say, "I'm sorry I upset you." I like when he's strange.

— Peter Capaldi

The Twelfth Doctor is, according to Capaldi, "more alien than he's been in a while." Whilst still defining himself as someone who "saves people," the Twelfth Doctor cares little about being seen as a hero or even being liked by the people who he is trying to save. Unlike his previous two incarnations who cared about humans and tried to understand them, Capaldi has confirmed that, this incarnation "doesn't quite understand human beings or really care very much about their approval." Clara is put on the back-foot by him post-regeneration initially not seeing through his 'Tough Exterior'. Jenna Coleman says of this Doctor, "He's more removed, you can't quite access him in the same way", in comparison to his more friendly and accessible predecessor.

Initially, it was reported that Capaldi specifically requested that the Doctor would not flirt with his companion the way his previous incarnation did, but the actor stated that he said no such thing and that it was inflated by the media. Steven Moffat has teased that Capaldi's Doctor may perhaps be more in love with Clara than he'd like to believe. He has also been described as a "total adrenaline junkie" and, according to Moffat, "much fiercer, madder [and] less reliable". "He's not as immediately approachable and he's not necessarily looking for your approval, when he says 'Wait here, I'll be back', you're not absolutely convinced... what he's not doing is reassuring you very much." Moffat also described the Twelfth Doctor as having attention deficit disorder; this was also implied by the character himself in the theatrical short "The Doctor's Meditation" in which he states that Clara believes he has the condition.

Mark Gatiss said that Capaldi's Doctor was "sort of Tom Baker, Jon Pertwee and even Christopher Eccleston style...it's someone who's not immediately going to be your best friend and can be quite abrupt and rude." Moffat added to this analysis of the character by saying, "He has a tremendous ability with throwaway humour and a lot of it is around the fact that sometimes he is terribly rude. I think kids will think he is the rude Doctor [...] You might want to cuddle him but he really will resist." Capaldi stated that part of the Doctor's personality would share "a certain acid wit" of Malcolm Tucker, "specifically the attitude, the wisecracks and the energy...he can be edgy, volatile and dangerous". Capaldi has stated that all of the previous actors who had played the Doctor were channelled in his portrayal and that his particular influences were Hartnell, Pertwee and Peter Davison. He has been described as an "older, fiercer, trickier Doctor". Despite his darker personality, Capaldi has said that the Doctor is still, "funny, joyful, passionate, emphatic, and fearless." While Jenna Coleman added that this time, the Doctor is more "enigmatic, mysterious, complex, worn, and unmannered" when compared to his immediate two predecessors. Steven Moffat has joked that he's "more Scottish than last time."

In Series 9, Capaldi described his character as a 'thrill-seeker' who is confronting danger where he soon realises that he is 'one of the luckiest creatures in all of time and space' and that 'life is short even at two-thousand years'. According to Coleman regarding Clara's bond with The Doctor inquiring if she had feelings for him she stated "She's totally in love with him, always has been. It's its own kind of love. He is her hero but she would be very reluctant to tell him that. It's a doctor-and-companion love, and there's nothing else like it really." "They're kind of freed of their issues and in a wonderful place together. Previously she was trying to keep him under control yet now the two of them are going 'Come on, lets jump, lets do it', egging each other on really, and being more and more reckless," she teased. Capaldi stated "It's sort of an utterly platonic bond, which is quite unusual. The problem is the Doctor knows a lot more than he ever says. He knows Clara's fate. He knows the fate of all his companions before they do." Ultimately it has been confirmed by both Capaldi and Coleman that the Doctor and Clara's relationship is romantic in nature. In this series it is also showcased that the Twelfth Doctor is also a proficient guitarist, a talent reflecting Capaldi himself.

For Series 10, Capaldi described his character as more "closed off" and "suspicious" than the previous season, he elaborated, "If you've been following this Doctor, you've seen him go through all those different colours and all those different places, and as for where he goes now, I don't know, but he's been put through the mill." Capaldi expressed in terms of his character, "Because in some ways he's much more amenable, but in other ways he's even darker. So I think that makes for a very interesting character." Upon discussing the interaction between The Doctor and his latest companion Bill Potts, Capaldi elaborated "It's a kind of teacher-pupil relationship, but it becomes more complex than that and I think ultimately the Doctor has to undergo some dramas by himself. So I think he becomes slightly worried that he's swept someone else up into his adventures without quite preparing them."

== Appearances ==
=== Television ===
The Twelfth Doctor makes a first, uncredited appearance in the programme's fiftieth anniversary special, "The Day of the Doctor" (2013), when thirteen incarnations of the Doctor unite to save his home planet of Gallifrey from destruction during the Time War. At first, Time Lords in Gallifrey's war room spot twelve blue TARDISes approaching and encircling the planet. This count is then corrected to thirteen by Androgar, and Capaldi's hands, eyes, and forehead are fleetingly shown (his eyebrows which feature prominently in the cameo appearance would subsequently be part of a running gag, dubbed the "attack eyebrows"). He then makes his full debut at the end of the next episode, "The Time of the Doctor", after the Eleventh Doctor (Matt Smith), about to die from old age, is given a new regeneration cycle from the Time Lords, who remain hidden in a pocket universe.

In the series 8 premiere "Deep Breath" (2014), the Doctor arrives in Victorian London, where he recovers from the stress of his regeneration, initially under the care of the Paternoster Gang. After uncovering a potential alien presence in London, the Doctor goes on the run as a homeless person for some time. While on the run, he believes he has seen his new face before, though does not recall from where. He and Clara Oswald are reunited by a third party, and realise that this third party has been conspiring to bring the two of them together for some time. The Doctor helps Clara overcome her reservations about his new personality and older physical appearance, and they begin travelling together once more. Over the course of the series, he and Clara have some ups and downs in their friendship caused both by the Doctor's callousness and because Clara wishes to keep her continued travelling a secret from her boyfriend, Danny Pink (Samuel Anderson); she is not able to resolve the situation before Danny dies in a road accident in the first part of the series finale, "Dark Water"/"Death in Heaven". In the finale, he meets Missy (Michelle Gomez), the latest incarnation of his nemesis, the Master, who reveals that she conspired to bring him and Clara together and has begun converting the Earth's dead into Cybermen; her plan is to compromise the Doctor's morality with the offer of an army with which to rule the universe. Missy's scheme is foiled, but not before many have died, and Earth is in chaos. The Doctor takes a weapon from Clara to spare his companion the burden of killing Missy herself. As the Doctor hesitates, a cyberconverted Brigadier Lethbridge-Stewart, retaining his humanity, appears to disintegrate Missy with a laser blast. After a traumatic ordeal, the Doctor and Clara part ways after lying to each other about their current situations, seemingly for good, before they are reunited by a shared dream in "Last Christmas" and agree to continue adventuring with the intervention of Santa Claus (Nick Frost).

In the series 9 premiere "The Magician's Apprentice"/"The Witch's Familiar" (2015), the Doctor, along with Clara and Missy, who survived her apparent disintegration, are summoned to the planet Skaro by The Doctor's nemesis Davros (Julian Bleach), the creator of the evil Dalek race, who is dying. Davros plays on the Doctor's sympathies to trick him into revitalising a dying Dalek empire, siphoning some of the Doctor's regeneration energy to do so. The Doctor also enlivens a mass of dying Daleks consigned to the sewers of Skaro, who begin to tear the city apart, and he makes his escape with Clara, but not before visiting Davros as a young boy on the battlefields of Skaro, and instilling in him a lesson about the virtues of mercy. In "The Girl Who Died," the Doctor finally remembers that he shares a face with a man he was persuaded to save in Pompeii, despite his initial reluctance to alter the timeline. He surmises that he subconsciously chose this face as a reminder that his job is to save lives. He is inspired to resurrect Viking girl Ashildr (Maisie Williams) with alien technology; he learns in "The Woman Who Lived" that she has become immortal and watches over his past companions. In "Face the Raven", Clara dies while trying to outsmart Ashildr, who stages an elaborate ploy to trap the Doctor, which he learns in "Heaven Sent" was on behalf of the Time Lords. Emerging from the trap on his home planet of Gallifrey, he sends a warning to the people of his return. In "Hell Bent", the Doctor deposes Time Lord President Rassilon (Donald Sumpter) and uses Time Lord technology to save Clara from the moments before her death, and then proceeds to run away with her to the end of time in the hopes of cheating death permanently. He is then persuaded by Ashildr that he and Clara are a dangerous influence on each other, and perhaps together constitute the "Hybrid of two great warrior races" which is prophesied to destroy Gallifrey. The Doctor attempts to wipe Clara's memories of him using a device, but she alters it so that it affects his memories of her instead; she leaves him behind on Earth with his TARDIS to start adventuring again. She departs in her own stolen TARDIS, alongside Ashildr, promising to one day return to Gallifrey and accept her death.

The Christmas special "The Husbands of River Song" (2015) is the Twelfth Doctor's first appearance alongside his roguish time-travelling wife River Song (Alex Kingston). After an emotionally wrought adventure, the Doctor and River finally confess the full extent of their feelings for each another, and he ends up fulfilling the history River told his earlier incarnation in "Silence in the Library" (2008): giving her his sonic screwdriver and spending a 24-year long date together as their final encounter. The Doctor next appears in the first episode of Doctor Who spin-off Class, appointing two alien refugees and a group of teenagers to protect the pupils and faculty of Coal Hill Academy from alien threats. He returns in 2016 Christmas special "The Return of Doctor Mysterio", alongside new companion (and the first full-time alien companion of the revived series) Nardole, an employee of River Song's introduced in the previous episode. Together, they save New York from being destroyed by aliens with ambitions of world domination.

In the series 10 premiere "The Pilot" (2017), it was revealed that the Doctor has spent decades working as a professor in St Luke's University in Bristol, giving lectures on time and life, assisted by Nardole. The Doctor has taken an oath to stay on Earth and guard a mysterious vault beneath the university. Bored after decades of confinement on Earth, he takes on Bill Potts as his new companion, despite Nardole's reminders about his oath. In "Extremis", the show reveals that Nardole came to assist the Doctor on orders given by River before she died, and that the mysterious vault contains Missy, whom the Doctor swore to watch over for a thousand years. Over "The Lie of the Land", "Empress of Mars" and "The Eaters of Light", the Doctor becomes more convinced that Missy has reformed her ways, and so in "World Enough and Time", he sends her to react to a distress call on a colony ship trapped in the gravity of a black hole. His plan goes horribly wrong when Bill is shot and converted into a Cyberman by medics in the lower floors of the ship, where, due to time dilation, many years go by. In the series finale, "The Doctor Falls", the Doctor faces an army of Cybermen and struggles to convince Missy to side with him; she is influenced by her past incarnation (John Simm), also on board the ship. Badly injured by the Cybermen's attacks, the Doctor sends Nardole away to evacuate humans from the ship before destroying an entire level of it. Appearing to have died, he is taken to the TARDIS by Bill, who has been restored to life by the timely intervention of her love interest, Heather (Stephanie Hyam). The Doctor wakes up alone and vows not to regenerate. Clinging onto his life, he wanders out of his TARDIS and encounters his first incarnation (David Bradley), who is facing similar reservations about his pending regeneration. In the Christmas special "Twice Upon A Time", the two Doctors reflect on their lives and, after witnessing the Christmas armistice of 1914, both decide to move on to their next forms. Alone in his TARDIS, the Twelfth Doctor speaks words of advice directed to his successor before regenerating into the Thirteenth Doctor.

=== Literature ===
New Series Adventures released novels starring the Twelfth Doctor and Clara Oswald in September 2014: Silhouette, The Crawling Terror, and The Blood Cell. The next wave was released in September 2015, with the stories of Deep Time, Royal Blood and Big Bang Generation; the first two of these also feature the Twelfth Doctor and Clara, while Big Bang Generation sees the Twelfth Doctor reunited with the Seventh Doctor's Virgin New Adventures companion Bernice Summerfield. In April 2017, three new novels were released, featuring new companions Nardole and Bill Potts. They are titled The Shining Man, Diamond Dogs and Plague City.

=== Audio ===
In February 2019, the Twelfth Doctor made his first Big Finish appearance in The Astrea Conspiracy, narrated by Neve McIntosh. The Twelfth Doctor has since appeared in more Short Trips stories and the anthology series The Twelfth Doctor Chronicles narrated by Jacob Dudman.

In 2025, following Dudman's departure and the end of The Twelfth Doctor Chronicles, voice actor and impressionist Jon Culshaw played the Twelfth Doctor in Merlin's Trap - a story in Big Finish's anthology Halloween special. In December, Big Finish announced that Culshaw would reprise the role for The Twelfth Doctor Adventures, a new series due for release in July 2026.

=== Video games ===
Capaldi voices the Lego counterpart of the Twelfth Doctor in the video game, Lego Dimensions, alongside Jenna Coleman and Michelle Gomez as Clara and Missy, respectively. He was also given his own level called “The Dalek Extermination of Earth”, where the Doctor uses the TARDIS to time travel to Central London in the year 2025, where the Daleks have taken over the world and the Doctor has to alter fate with the power of time travel. He also lent his voice to the character in the CBBC online game, The Doctor and the Dalek and in the Doctor Who Game Maker on the official Doctor Who site.

== Reception ==
Peter Capaldi has received critical acclaim for his portrayal of the Doctor. Following the broadcast of "Deep Breath", Euan Ferguson of The Guardian called his performance "wise and thoughtful", while Michael Hogan of The Telegraph felt that Capaldi's portrayal "crackled with fierce intelligence and nervous energy". Capaldi's performance in "Listen" was praised with Alasdair Wilkins of The A.V. Club, stating "Capaldi turns in a suitably fearless performance, reaching his obsessive crescendo as he prepares to meet whatever is waiting for him at the end of the universe". His acting in "The Caretaker" was praised by Morgan Jeffery of Digital Spy, noting "Capaldi's is the most complex and variable take on the Time Lord we've seen since Eccleston".

In January 2015, Capaldi became the first actor to portray the Doctor not be shortlisted for a National Television Award since the series revival in 2005. Ahead of the British Academy Television Awards that year, Paul Flynn of The Telegraph noted that Capaldi's portrayal of the Doctor had the effect of "significantly reducing Doctor Who's glamour quotient". Later, Capaldi received a TV Choice Awards nomination for Best Actor. He was also nominated for a BAFTA Cymru Award in the Best Actor category for his acting in "Dark Water". Steven Moffat praised his leading man, stating "we could argue for the rest of our lives about who's the best Doctor — but for me, the best single performance in the role is settled forever. You can only ask a solo of a virtuoso, so thank God and Scotland for Peter Capaldi". Capaldi's predecessor, Matt Smith, applauded him as having "reinvented" Doctor Who. Colin Baker praised the 12th Doctor noting "[Capaldi's Doctor] is grumpy and curmudgeonly and intolerant, and gosh – I should be playing it now [...] I love his style, and I love his character". In a later interview, Baker expressed that Capaldi initially had "a rough deal" as fans weren't very kind towards his incarnation, as they had been conditioned towards "eye candy" in the form of "dashing role model[s]" popularised by David Tennant.

Den of Geek' Simon Brew lauded Capaldi in "Before the Flood" noting "his performance continues to mix grumpiness, friendliness, intelligence and a large dose of alien". Catherine Gee of The Telegraph credited Capaldi's acting in "The Woman Who Lived" noting "he has grown into the role utterly and completely. He embodies the weight of the Doctor's responsibility". His performance in "The Zygon Inversion" was heavily praised by with Dan Martin of The Guardian, stating "this Doctor has never been written better, Capaldi has never channelled Tom Baker more". Most prominently Capaldi's performance in "Heaven Sent" received universal acclaim, with Patrick Mulkern of Radio Times noting that "Peter Capaldi's one-man show is an instant classic". Jeffery of Digital Spy praised the final moments between the Doctor and River Song in "The Husbands of River Song", writing "combined with Capaldi and Kingston's sensitive work [...] you feel a weight of history between these two people who've never shared a screen before". In June 2016, Peter Capaldi was shortlisted for a national TV Choice Award for Best Actor. He had also been submitted for a Primetime Emmy Award nomination for Outstanding Lead Actor in a Drama Series. In addition, Capaldi was announced as a BAFTA Scotland Awards nomination as Best Actor on Television.

Mulkern of Radio Times praised Sarah Dollard's writing of the Doctor in "Thin Ice", noting how she "examines his moral code; the ideals he aspires to and the crimes and misdemeanors he's prepared to indulge". The Doctor and The Master's interactions in "Extremis" was complimented by The A.V. Club's Wilkins as recalling "a more emotionally complex version of the repartee that Jon Pertwee's Doctor and Roger Delgado's Master had during their many encounters". After the broadcast of "World Enough and Time", Steven Moffat paid a special tribute to Capaldi, saying "Peter only has to think at the screen and you know what he's thinking [...] Despite trying to fight his emotions, he has given us the most emotional Doctor." Capaldi received overwhelming praise for his performance in "The Doctor Falls", with Radio Times's Mulkern noting the episode as a story dedicated to the character and how he "stands tall". Digital Spy's Jeffery praised Capaldi's "Where I stand is where I fall" speech, noting it as possibly the actor's finest moment to date. Brew of Den of Geek heavily praised the actor's performance, writing "If you needed a reminder of just how much he's going to be missed when he finally departs Doctor Who at the end of the year, his outstanding work here was precisely that".

Critics heavily praised Peter Capaldi's final performance in "Twice Upon a Time" and the characterisation of the Twelfth Doctor over three series. Sam Wollaston of The Guardian said it was hard to say goodbye to this "brilliant Doctor", who has been "warm, wise, kind, funny and human". Mulkern named Capaldi his ideal kind of Doctor: "senior, crusty, steely, funny but with anguish burning through those wizened eyes". Caroline Siede for The A.V. Club stated that the episode gave Capaldi a "beautiful final showcase that demonstrates just how much he's grown into the role". Vulture's Ruediger regarded the Twelfth Doctor as "the pinnacle" of Doctor Who and the only incarnation who grew as a character, stating "it's been done and accomplished so successfully, it will be difficult for the show to turn back. Peter Capaldi raised the bar for who and what the Doctor can be". Wilkins from Inverse stated that the Twelfth Doctor "who began his existence so prickly and aloof would end it as the champion of kindness" was testament to how much the Doctor had grown. He felt Capaldi played this Doctor's kindness as "the most urgently honest expression of himself, and in doing so made his Doctor vulnerable and open in a way none of his predecessors ever really attempted".

== See also ==
- "From the Doctor to My Son Thomas"
