= Thin Ice (Doctor Who episode) =

267 – "Thin Ice"
- Doctor Who episode

Cast
- Doctor: Peter Capaldi – Twelfth Doctor
- Companions: Pearl Mackie – Bill Potts; Matt Lucas – Nardole
- Others: Nicholas Burns – Sutcliffe; Asiatu Koroma – Kitty; Peter Singh – Pie-Man; Simon Ludders – Overseer; Tomi May – Dowell; Austin Taylor – Spider; Ellie Shenker – Dot; Kishaina Thiruselvan – Harriet; Badger Skelton – Perry

Production
- Directed by: Bill Anderson
- Written by: Sarah Dollard
- Produced by: Nikki Wilson
- Executive producers: Steven Moffat; Brian Minchin
- Music by: Murray Gold
- Series: Series 10
- Running time: 44 minutes
- First broadcast: 29 April 2017

Chronology
← Preceded by "Smile"	Followed by → "Knock Knock"

"Thin Ice" is the third episode of the tenth series of the British science fiction television series Doctor Who. It was written by Sarah Dollard and broadcast on 29 April 2017 on BBC One. "Thin Ice" received mostly positive reviews from critics, with many labelling the topic of racism in the episode as well-executed.

The Doctor (Peter Capaldi) and Bill Potts (Pearl Mackie) visit the last great frost fair in London 1814, but they soon find that something sinister is lurking below the frozen Thames.

== Synopsis ==
The Twelfth Doctor and Bill find they have arrived in London in 1814, in the midst of a frost fair on the frozen Thames. After dressing in period garments, they take time to explore it, unaware the TARDIS sensors have identified a large life form, a kilometre long, under the ice.

The Doctor's sonic screwdriver is stolen by Spider, one of several orphan pickpockets led by Kitty. The Doctor and Bill chase down Spider and Kitty away from the fair. There, glowing lights under the ice encircle Spider's feet and before the Doctor can save him, Spider is pulled through the ice. Bill is troubled by the Doctor's apparent lack of concern for Spider's death. They track down Kitty and learn they have been paid to bring more people to the fair, with some having gone missing.

The Doctor and Bill get into diving suits and purposely let the lights take them; the lights belong to strange fish, and they find a giant sea creature ensnared by chains, which has eaten Spider and others. Returning to land, they learn from Kitty that their benefactor is the wealthy Lord Sutcliffe. Sutcliffe affirms his family has used the creature to amass a fortune by feeding it victims then collecting and selling its waste as a super powerful replacement for coal. Fearing the Doctor knows too much, Sutcliffe sends the Doctor and Bill to be eaten, while he rigs a bomb to cause the ice to shatter with maximum possible casualties for fish food.

The Doctor and Bill escape, and the Doctor insists that Bill decide whether to free the creature and risk it causing further deaths, or to allow human progress to be aided by its enslavement. She chooses to save the creature. Bill works with Kitty and the other orphans to clear people off the ice, while the Doctor takes the bomb and places it on the creature's chains. When Sutcliffe sets off the bomb, the creature is able to swim free and Sutcliffe is lost in the freezing water. The Doctor rewrites the deed to the Sutcliffe mansion and its staff to the orphans, allowing them to live there as long as they want.

They return to the present, where Nardole scolds the Doctor for breaking his oath to stay on Earth. Bill finds from old newspapers that the orphans lived a fulfilling life, though is surprised to discover no mention of the sea creature. Nardole, while checking the Vault beneath the University, hears something behind it knock repeatedly and promises to prevent its release even if the Doctor is distracted.

=== Continuity ===
The Doctor mentions that he has attended Frost Fairs before. In "A Good Man Goes to War" (2011), River Song says that the Eleventh Doctor took her to the 1814 Fair for her birthday, where they were serenaded by Stevie Wonder. The First Doctor took Vicki and Steven to the 1814 fair in Frostfire, where they encounter Jane Austen. The Twelfth Doctor took Clara Oswald to a frost fair in the 1890s in the novel Silhouette, after promising to take her to one of them in "The Caretaker" (2014).

The Doctor uses the alias "Doctor Disco", which he previously referred to himself as in "The Zygon Invasion" (2015).

=== Outside references ===
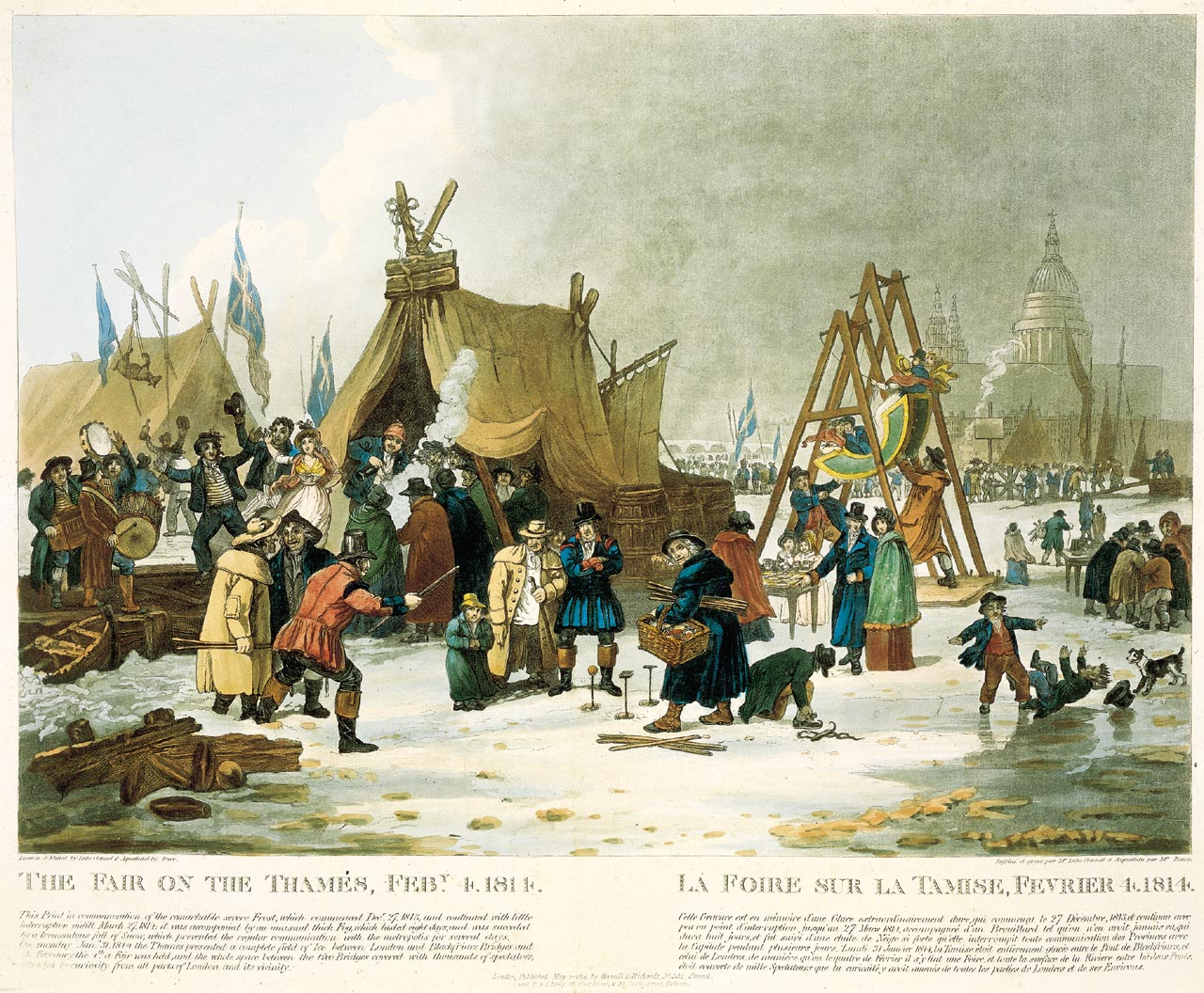
The Frost Fair of 1814, by Luke Clenell

The episode features a visit to the 1814 frost fair, the last one to be held between Blackfriars Bridge and Old London Bridge (replaced in 1831), which caused the water flow in the Thames to slow enough to allow it to freeze. As part of a stunt during that fair, replicated in this episode, an elephant was led across the frozen Thames.

During one scene with the orphans, the Doctor reads them "The Story of Little Suck-a-Thumb" from Heinrich Hoffmann's Struwwelpeter, published in 1845.

Dollard unconsciously named Lord Sutcliffe after Dr Donald Sutcliffe, a character in the Hannibal episode "Buffet Froid", as she was writing Hannibal fan fiction at the same time as the "Thin Ice" script. She said that she feels Donald Sutcliffe could be a descendant of Lord Sutcliffe's family, as the characters are similarly "selfish and twisted".

== Production ==
The read-through for the second production block of the tenth series took place on 18 July 2016, and filming began on 1 August 2016, starting with the third episode of the series, "Thin Ice", and then the fourth episode, "Knock Knock".

It was primarily filmed in Cardiff and Bristol, utilising a mix of standing sets, historic manors, and authentic city streets to recreate 1814 London. Specific locations used in the episode include:Roath Lock Studios (Cardiff): The exterior of the massive 1814 Frost Fair, including sections of the frozen River Thames and Blackfriars Bridge, was constructed on the backlot and in the studios. Custom House (Cardiff): Located on Bute Street, this served as the hideout for the street urchins. Enterprise House (Cardiff): Also situated on Bute Street, this was utilised as the work and dredgers' yard downriver from the Frost Fair. Kings Weston House (Bristol): This 18th-century historic mansion in nearby Bristol stood in for Lord Sutcliffe's manor. Main Building, Cardiff University: Interior shots of St. Luke’s University (where the Doctor is a professor alongside Bill Potts) were filmed on the campus. Pinewood Studio Wales (Cardiff): The underwater and aquatic Thames scenes were shot on a soundstage here.

== Broadcast and reception ==
The episode was watched by 3.76 million viewers overnight, a slight decrease from the opening two episodes of the series, and came fourth in the ratings behind Britain's Got Talent, All Round to Mrs. Brown's and Casualty. The episode received 5.61 million views overall, which tied with "Sleep No More" from the previous series for the lowest consolidated figures of the revived era of the show, until "Oxygen" two weeks later, which received 5.27 million viewers. It received an Appreciation Index score of 84.

=== Critical reception ===
Professional ratings
Aggregate scores
Source	Rating
Rotten Tomatoes (Tomatometer)	94%
Rotten Tomatoes (Average Rating)	8.4/10
Review scores
Source	Rating
The A.V. Club	A
Entertainment Weekly	B+
SFX Magazine	4/5 stars
TV Fanatic	3/5 stars
IndieWire	B
IGN	8.2
New York Magazine	5/5 stars
Radio Times	5/5 stars
Daily Mirror	4/5 stars

On Rotten Tomatoes, 94% of 17 critics gave the episode a positive review, with the site's consensus reading "'Thin Ice' uses a light touch and timely themes to bolster an episode driven more by character development than high-stakes drama."

Alasdair Wilkins of The A.V. Club awarded the episode a grade of "A", crediting Dollard's writing as "brilliant" and being "a story and script worthy" for the Doctor and Bill, and noting that "there's much to celebrate about this episode". Wilkins also praised the episode's direction, despite it echoing previous stories from the show. "Thin Ice" was summed up as a fun episode, stating "that's as good an indicator as any of Doctor Who at its best".

Nivea Serrao of Entertainment Weekly also praised the episode generally, as well as Bill and her reaction to her surroundings, and the Doctor's realization that he had seen and caused a lot of death. She also noted with approval how the episode treated the issue of racism in the past, and awarded the episode a B+ grade.

However, Kathleen Wiedel of TV Fanatic gave the episode only 3 stars out of 5, stating that the episode "really strayed too far into whole plot references to be altogether enjoyable for its own sake", how previous and similar episodes have already used the "humans are the real monsters" trope, and the lack of impressiveness at Bill's outrage at the Doctor's inability to save everyone all the time.

Scott Collura of IGN gave the episode an 8.2/10, looking at the structure of the story and stating that the episode follows the same pattern that the previous two used, another one-off that shares similarities to the classic era. He praised the fact that, as "Bill wades deeper into the exciting insanity of the Doctor's lifestyle, she also realizes that it's not all fun and games". Daniel Jackson from Radio Times gave the episode a full 5 stars, commending the story for its multi-layered structure and exploring the hidden depths in the characters. He commented on how Sarah Dollard explored the characters and how she "examines his moral code; the ideals he aspires to and the crimes and misdemeanors he's prepared to indulge."
