= Winter of 1962–1963 in the United Kingdom =

Winter of 1962–63 in the United Kingdom
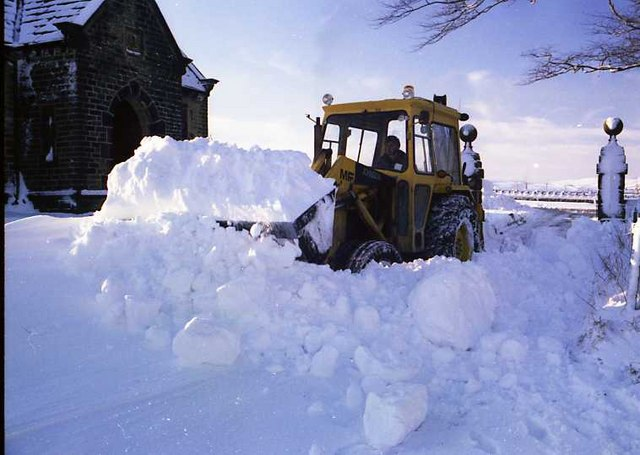
- Snowplough clearing snow near Mereclough, Lancashire

Overall effects
- Areas affected: United Kingdom and Ireland

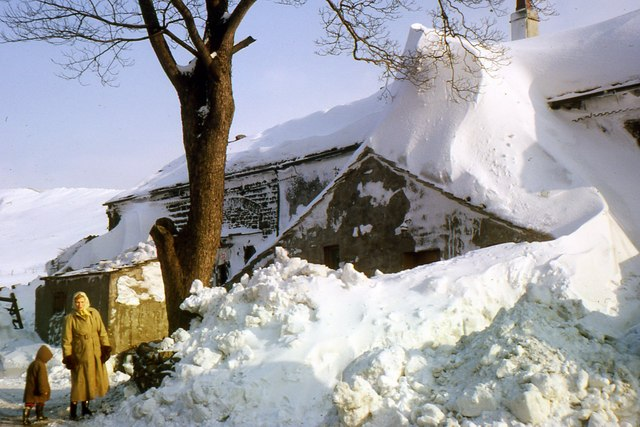
Deep snow near Burrow-with-Burrow, Lancashire, England, January 1963.

The winter of 1962–1963, known as the Big Freeze of 1963, was one of the coldest winters (defined as the months of December, January and February) on record in the United Kingdom. Temperatures plummeted and lakes and rivers began to freeze over.

In the Central England Temperature (CET) record extending back to 1659, only the winters of 1683–1684 and 1739–1740 were colder than 1962–1963. The winter of 1962–1963 remains the coldest since at least 1895 in all meteorological districts of the United Kingdom, although in north Scotland the winter of 2009–2010 was equally cold. The winter of 1894–1895 was colder than that of 1962–1963 in north Scotland and east Scotland, whilst, although instrumental temperature data for Scotland and Northern Ireland do not extend back to 1740, (Note: The oldest instrumental climatic data for Scotland are from Edinburgh in 1764 and for Northern Ireland from Armagh in 1796.) station data from subsequent years suggest that the winters of 1813–1814 and 1878–1879 were almost certainly colder than 1962–1963 over Scotland and Northern Ireland, and that the winter of 1779–1780 may also have been colder over Scotland. (Note: It is also possible, although less likely, that the winters of 1822–1823, 1837–1838 and 1859–1860 were comparably cold over Scotland to that of 1962–1963.)

== December 1962 ==
A wintry outbreak brought snow to the country on 12–13 December 1962. A cold easterly set in on 22 December as an anticyclone formed over Scandinavia, drawing cold continental winds from Russia. Throughout the Christmas period, the Scandinavian high collapsed, but a new high formed near Iceland, bringing northerly winds. Significant snowfall occurred on the 26 and 27 December as the air mass moved south, the snow arriving in Shropshire around lunchtime on the 26th and parts of Southern England late that same day. The cold air became firmly established.

=== 29 and 30 December 1962 ===
Overnight on 29-30 December 1962 a blizzard swept across southern England and Wales. Snow drifted to more than 20 feet (6.1 m) deep in places, driven by gale force easterly winds, blocking roads and railways. The snow stranded villages and brought down power lines. The near-freezing temperatures meant that the snow cover lasted for more than two months in some areas. Snow was 6 inches (15 cm) deep in Manchester city centre, 9 inches (23 cm) in Wythenshawe, and about 18 inches (46 cm) at Keele University in Staffordshire. By the end of the month, there were snow drifts 8 feet (2.4 m) deep in Kent and 15 feet (4.6 m) deep in the west.

On 31 December, Big Ben was delayed by 10 minutes due to the large amount of snow that had accumulated on the clock hands, and the New Year ended up being rung in 10 minutes late.

== January 1963 ==
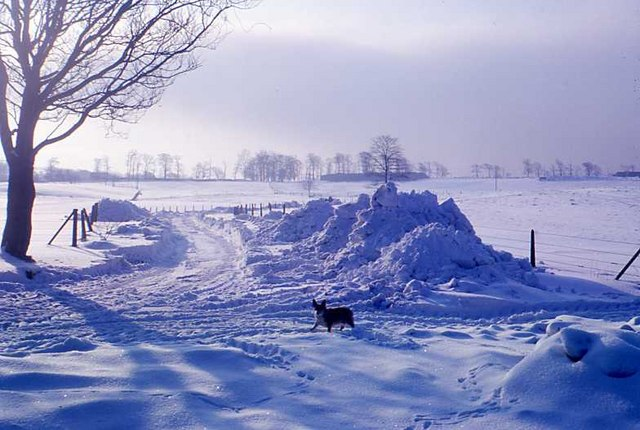
Snow in Lancashire, January 1963

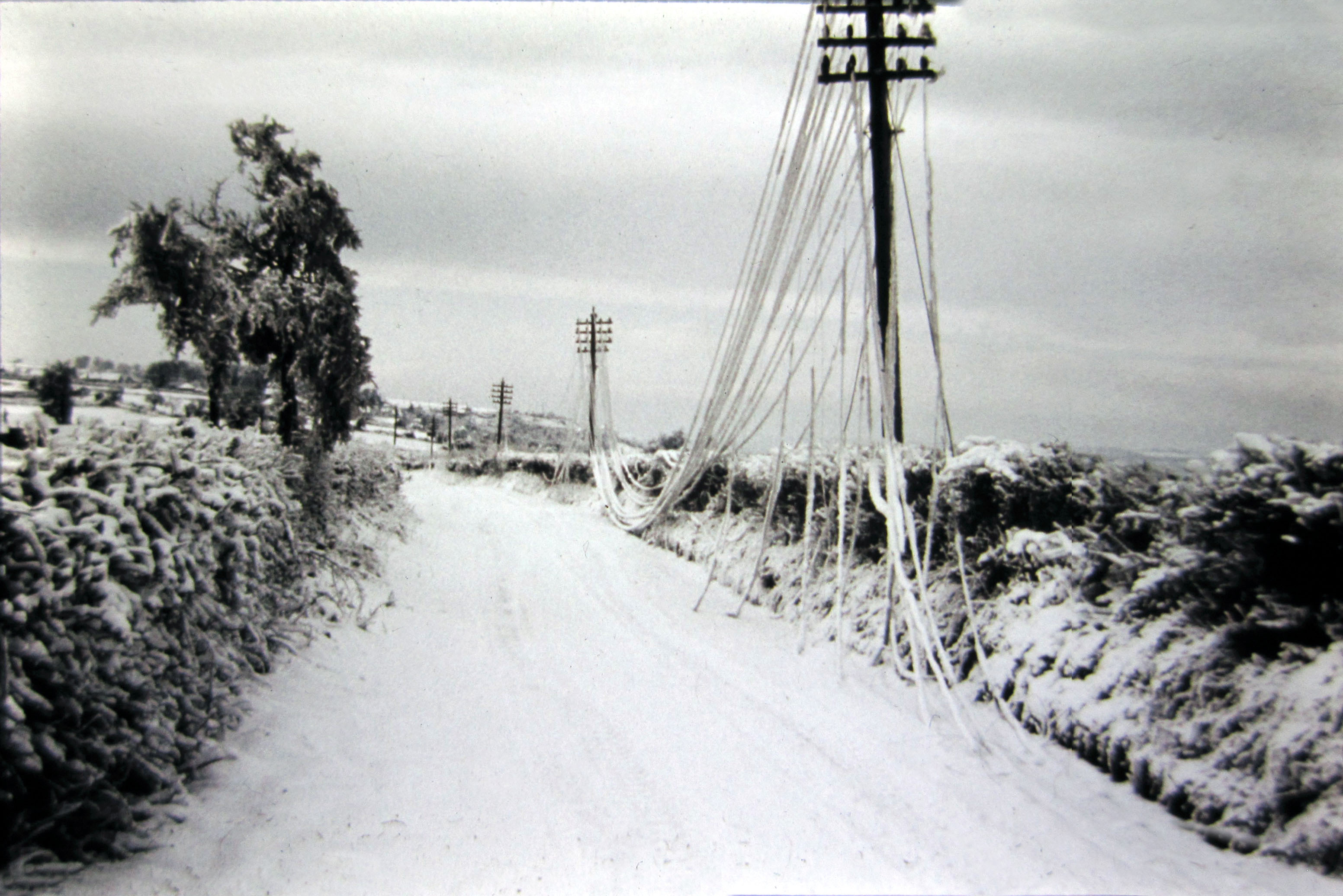
The weight of snow and ice stretched the copper telephone wires until they reached the ground. East Dundry Lane, Somerset, January 1963

With an average temperature of −2.1 °C (28.2 °F), January 1963 remains the coldest month since January 1814 in Central England, although for the UK as a whole and in Northern England, Scotland and Northern Ireland February 1947 and February 1895 were colder, whilst December 2010 was also colder in Northern Ireland. Much of England and Wales was covered in snow throughout the month. Scotland experienced temperatures as low as −19.4 °C (−2.9 °F) at Achany in Sutherland on the 11th. Freezing fog was a hazard for most of the country.

At various locations in the UK, it had been the coldest January on record for long established stations such as Newquay and Ross-on-Wye with the coldest January on record since 1891 and 1877 respectively. It was the coldest January at Kew since 1838.

In January 1963, the sea froze for one mile (1.6 km) from the shore at Herne Bay, Kent. The sea froze inshore in many places, removing many British inland water birds' usual last resort of finding food in estuaries and shallow sea. The sea froze 4 miles (6 km) out to sea from Dunkirk. The upper reaches of the River Thames froze over. The ice was thick enough in some places that people were skating on it, and on 22 January a car was driven across the frozen Thames at Oxford.

However, it did not freeze in Central London, partly due to the hot effluent from two thermal power stations, Battersea and Bankside. The removal of the multi-arched London Bridge, which had obstructed the river's free flow, and the addition of the river embankments, also kept the river from freezing in London as it had in earlier times (see River Thames frost fairs).

On 20 January, 283 workers had to be rescued by RAF helicopters from Fylingdales, where they had been snowbound for several days. Icicles hung from many roof gutterings, some as long as 3 feet (0.9 m).

On 25 January, there was a brief thaw that lasted three days.

== February 1963 ==
Snow continued to fall in February 1963, which was stormy with winds reaching Force 8 on the Beaufort scale (gale-force winds).

A 36-hour blizzard caused heavy drifting snow in most parts of the country. Drifts reached 20 feet (6.1 m) in some areas and gale-force winds reached up to 81 miles per hour (130 km/h). On the Isle of Man, wind speeds were recorded at 119 miles per hour (192 km/h).

== March 1963 ==
6 March was the first morning of the year without frost in Britain. Temperatures rose to 17 °C (62.6 °F) and the remaining snow disappeared. The thaw was gradual, and unlike 1947, there was no widespread flooding.

== Effect on sport ==
Sport was disrupted in the winter of 1962–1963 in the UK. Football matches in the English and Scottish leagues suffered because of the severe effects of the winter weather. Some matches in the FA Cup were rescheduled ten or more times. Matches in the fifth and sixth rounds, scheduled for 16 February and 9 March respectively, were played on 16 and 30 March. A board known as the Pools Panel was set up to adjudicate postponed matches to provide the football pool results. From 8 December to 16 February, Bolton Wanderers played no competitive matches. Both codes of rugby, union and league, suffered much the same fate. The delays occurred before under-soil heating became widespread at major venues. When the thaw arrived, a backlog of fixtures had to be hastily determined. The Football League season was extended by four weeks from its original finishing date of 27 April. The final league fixtures (scheduled sports events) took place one day before the rescheduled FA Cup final. Some lower-level competitions did not complete the season.

National Hunt horse racing was also affected by the weather. Ninety-four meetings were cancelled during the freeze. There was no racing in England between 23 December and 7 March, although a meeting at Ayr in Scotland occurred on 5 January.

== In popular culture ==
The cold of the winter of 1962–1963 is referred to in Dream Academy's 1985 hit single "Life in a Northern Town". The lyrics include the phrase "In winter 1963 / It felt like the world would freeze".

The 2017 Christmas special and first episode of season seven of Call the Midwife were set during the winter of 1962–1963. The cold was a factor in several of the drama's plot points. Actress Jenny Agutter, who plays Sister Julienne, wrote an article in The Times about her memories of the 1962–63 winter to coincide with the Christmas special.

Several episodes of the television drama series The Edgar Wallace Mysteries were filmed during the 1962–1963 winter, and the effects of the Big Freeze on both urban and rural locations were captured on film.

The 1963 crime film Calculated Risk was filmed during The Big Freeze and makes ample use of the weather, with music composed by George Martin while he was working with The Beatles.

The 2001 Doctor Who novella Time and Relative written by Kim Newman and published by Telos Publishing was set during the winter of 62/63 and the author posits that it is an alien 'cold' entity which is causing the wintery conditions. In the novella, which is told from the point of view of the Doctor's granddaughter Susan, the Doctor must try to find a solution and to send the entity packing.

Andrew Miller's 2024 novel The Land in Winter, which was shortlisted for the 2025 Booker Prize, is set in the West Country during the winter of 1962–1963. The plot is driven by the severe blizzards of late December 1962, which leave two neighbouring couples isolated and under pressure.

== See also ==
- Great Frost of 1709
- Winter of 1946–47 in the United Kingdom
- 1987 United Kingdom and Ireland cold wave
- Winter of 1990–91 in Western Europe
- Winter of 2009–10 in Europe
- Winter of 2009–10 in Great Britain and Ireland
- Winter of 2010–11 in Europe

== Sources ==
- L.P. Smith, Seasonable Weather, George Allen & Unwin Ltd, 1968, p133
- The winter of 1962/63
- Another summary page
