= Knock Knock (Doctor Who) =

268 – "Knock Knock"
- Doctor Who episode

Cast
- Doctor: Peter Capaldi – Twelfth Doctor
- Companions: Pearl Mackie – Bill Potts; Matt Lucas – Nardole
- Others: David Suchet – The Landlord; Mariah Gale – Eliza; Mandeep Dhillon – Shireen; Colin Ryan – Harry; Ben Presley – Paul; Alice Hewkin – Felicity; Bart Suavek – Pavel; Sam Benjamin – Estate Agent; Tate Pitchie-Cooper – Young Landlord

Production
- Directed by: Bill Anderson
- Written by: Mike Bartlett
- Produced by: Nikki Wilson
- Executive producers: Steven Moffat; Brian Minchin
- Music by: Murray Gold
- Series: Series 10
- Running time: 44 minutes
- First broadcast: 6 May 2017

Chronology
← Preceded by "Thin Ice"	Followed by → "Oxygen"

"Knock Knock" is the fourth episode of the tenth series of the British science fiction television series Doctor Who. It was written by Mike Bartlett and was broadcast on 6 May 2017 on BBC One.

Bill Potts (Pearl Mackie) and her friends rent a house to live in after a recommendation from its landlord (played by guest star David Suchet) but the Doctor (Peter Capaldi) notices something wrong with the house when the floor and the walls creak and creatures come crawling out of the wood.

Most critics praised the performances in the episode, although the response to the writing was more mixed.

== Synopsis ==
Bill and five students (Shireen, Pavel, Harry, Felicity and Paul), seeking to room together, take an offer by an elderly Landlord for a large mansion at very low cost, as long as they do not enter the tower. Bill gets the Twelfth Doctor to help with her move. The Doctor inserts himself among Bill's friends by posing as her grandfather, to Bill's consternation, and is troubled by the numerous noises the house makes.

Later, the Landlord mysteriously appears, ostensibly to check on the students. Suspicious of him, the Doctor tests him by asking who the Prime Minister is and names several, including Harriet Jones. The Landlord, however, evades the question and leaves. As night falls, the knocking noises grow, and Bill's friends start to disappear. All the exits from the house are sealed tight, preventing any of them from leaving and separating the remaining ones. Bill and Shireen see Pavel half-absorbed in the wall, and the Landlord appears, striking a tuning fork which causes Pavel to disappear completely. The Doctor discovers the house's woodwork infested with insect-like creatures he calls Dryads. They are responsible for drawing the others into the woodwork prior to consuming them. The Doctor and Harry soon find evidence that every twenty years, a new set of students have been brought to the house to feed the Dryads. The Landlord arrives and admits that he needs the Dryads to keep his daughter Eliza alive in the tower.

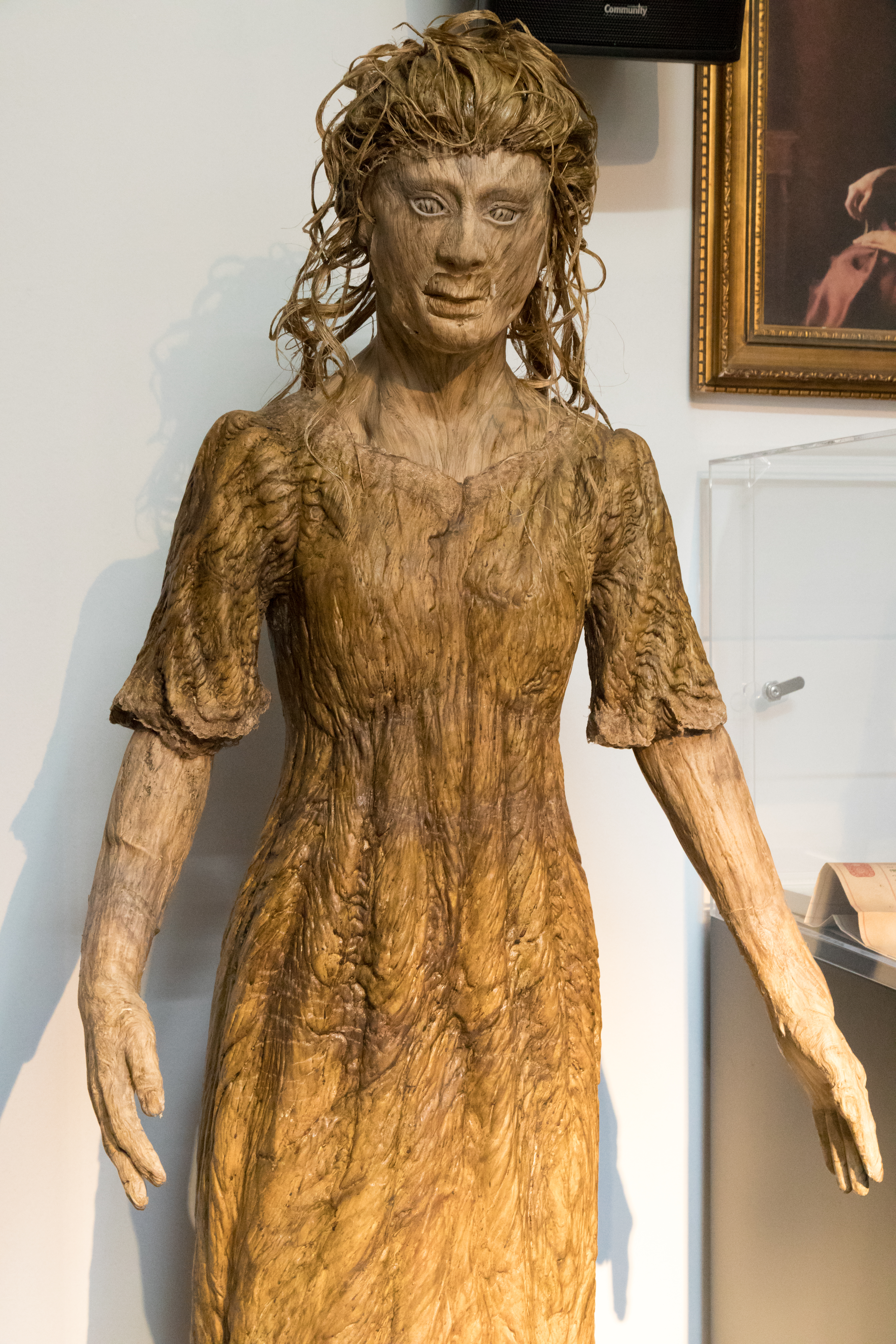
Eliza, on display at a Doctor Who exhibition

The Doctor and Bill converge on the tower, finding Eliza's body is now made completely of wood. The Doctor determines that the Landlord is actually Eliza's son, a memory long forgotten. As a boy, he had brought his terminally-ill mother some dormant Dryads he found, unaware of their power. When they heard a high-pitched sound from her music box, they awoke and started turning Eliza to wood to stave off her illness. Since then, the Landlord has controlled the Dryads to keep Eliza well while signing on new tenants to become the Dryads' source of nourishment. Eliza is dismayed to find she has been "living" for so long without an actual life outside the house. Being able to control the Dryads, Eliza takes the Landlord into a hug, over his objections, and thanks the Doctor before having the Dryads consume them, while also reconstituting all of Bill's friends. The group escapes the house before it collapses in on itself.

Back at the university, the Doctor offers to take over watch of the vault from Nardole. Piano music plays from within as the Doctor enters to have dinner with the prisoner inside.

=== Continuity ===
When talking about the Time Lords, Bill asks "Do you wear robes and big hats?", to which the Doctor replies "No, big collars mostly". This is a reference to many previous episodes in which Time Lords had been seen wearing large collars with their robes, which were introduced in The Deadly Assassin (1976), and had most recently been seen in "Hell Bent" (2015). The Doctor also inadvertently mentions regeneration, but then quickly changes the subject.

When listing past Prime Ministers, the Doctor includes Harriet Jones.

=== Outside references ===
Bill is called out for having a Little Mix playlist by her roommates. The Little Mix songs "Black Magic" and "Weird People" are played during the episode. The Doctor says it reminds him of Quincy Jones, whom he "stepped in for" once.

== Production ==
The read-through for the second production block of the tenth series took place on 18 July 2016, and filming began on 1 August 2016, starting with the third episode of the series, "Thin Ice", and then the fourth episode, "Knock Knock". The episode was originally titled "The Haunted Hub".

The Fields House in Newport served as the mansion in this story; it had also been used for the Wester Drumlins house in the episode Blink. David Suchet stated he "completely freaked" when he realized on the third day of filming that his family had rented exactly the same house the Christmas before for the holidays.

Cefn Tilla Court in Usk was also used as a filming location for this episode.

In an earlier version of the script Harry, one of Bill's friends, was to be revealed as the grandson of a previous companion of the Fourth Doctor, Harry Sullivan, but this scene was later dropped from the final script.

=== Cast notes ===
The guest star David Suchet who plays The Landlord, starred in the Agatha Christie's Poirot episode "Wasps' Nest" alongside Peter Capaldi, who played the guest role of Claude Langton.

== Broadcast and reception ==
After the episode was first broadcast, people in the UK could view a binaural version of the episode on BBC iPlayer. The episode was watched by 4.32 million overnight, up a half-million viewers from the previous episode, "Thin Ice", and the highest-viewed story overnight since the series opener "The Pilot". The episode received 5.73 million views overall, up slightly from the previous episode, and received an Appreciation Index score of 83.

=== Critical reception ===
Professional ratings
Aggregate scores
Source	Rating
Rotten Tomatoes (Tomatometer)	88%
Rotten Tomatoes (Average Rating)	7.6/10
Review scores
Source	Rating
The A.V. Club	B+
Entertainment Weekly	B+
SFX Magazine	3/5 stars
TV Fanatic	4.5/5 stars
IGN	8.7
New York Magazine	2/5 stars
Radio Times	4/5 stars

Press reaction to "Knock Knock" was "mixed. While many reviewers disagree about the strength of the writing, most are agreed on the quality of the performances in the story." 88% of 17 critics gave the episode a positive review on Rotten Tomatoes, and the website's critical summary reads, "A bit of narrative weakness aside, 'Knock Knock' is a wonderful mix of nostalgia, horror, humor, and monsters that culminates into[sic] a powerful and emotionally complex episode."

Alasdair Wilkins of The A.V. Club awarded the episode a grade "B+", praising the decision to take on a genre such as the episode did, stating that the "episode is a horror movie, with all the customary trappings", such as the "spookier" landlord, the young people, and the eerie music, stating that the episode was "old-fashioned", in a positive sense.

In contrast to the positive reviews, Zoe Delahunty-Light of SFX gave the episode 3 stars out of 5, describing "Knock Knock" as a "thoroughly adequate, infuriatingly inoffensive episode", describing the writing as poor, and the characterization of Bill as blunt, though praising Suchet's "masterful" acting in the episode. She also complimented the relationship between the Doctor and Bill, dubbing the latter the Doctor's "perfect companion", but noted that the story lacked depth and insulted Bill's intelligence.

Scott Collura of IGN gave the episode an 8.7/10, complimenting the dynamic between the Doctor and Bill, especially their "father or grandfather" relationship. He also stated that the episode was a "straight-up horror story", but noted that the one-off stories that had made up the series thus far had not given time to establish any meaningful characters besides the two stars.

Ross Ruediger of New York Magazine gave the episode 2 stars out of 5. He stated that the series thus far had been light on alien menaces and the explanations for them, and that the mood created was effective, but it did little else for the episode. Ruediger also mentioned the inability to "overcome the glaring plot holes and weird inconsistencies in the script", such as the failure to release the previous tenants along with Bill and her friends, and the number of questions the episode left unanswered. He did, however, praise Suchet as reliable.
