= Smile (Doctor Who) =

266 – "Smile"
- Doctor Who episode

Cast
- Doctor: Peter Capaldi – Twelfth Doctor
- Companions: Pearl Mackie – Bill Potts; Matt Lucas – Nardole
- Others: Kiran L. Dadlani – Kezzia; Mina Anwar – Goodthing; Kaizer Akhtar – Praiseworthy; Ralf Little – Steadfast; Kalungi Ssebandeke – Nate; Kiran Shah – Emojibot 1; Craig Garner – Emojibot 2

Production
- Directed by: Lawrence Gough
- Written by: Frank Cottrell-Boyce
- Produced by: Peter Bennett
- Executive producers: Steven Moffat; Brian Minchin
- Music by: Murray Gold
- Series: Series 10
- Running time: 46 minutes
- First broadcast: 22 April 2017

Chronology
← Preceded by "The Pilot"	Followed by → "Thin Ice"

"Smile" is the second episode of the tenth series of the British science fiction television series Doctor Who. It was written by Frank Cottrell-Boyce and broadcast on 22 April 2017 on BBC One.

In the episode, the Doctor (Peter Capaldi) and his new companion Bill Potts (Pearl Mackie) visit an off-Earth colony only to find it devoid of any life except for robots that communicate via emoji.

== Synopsis ==
Despite Nardole's caution, the Twelfth Doctor allows Bill to select her first destination for a trip in the TARDIS. They land in the far future on an off-world Earth colony. (Note: Referred to offscreen as Gliese 581 D.) The colony is empty except for millions of nanobots called the Vardy that maintain it, along with robotic avatars that interact with the pair via emoji. (Note: Referred to offscreen as Emojibots.) The robots give the Doctor and Bill badges which report their emotions also through emoji—seemingly the only way to communicate with the Vardy.

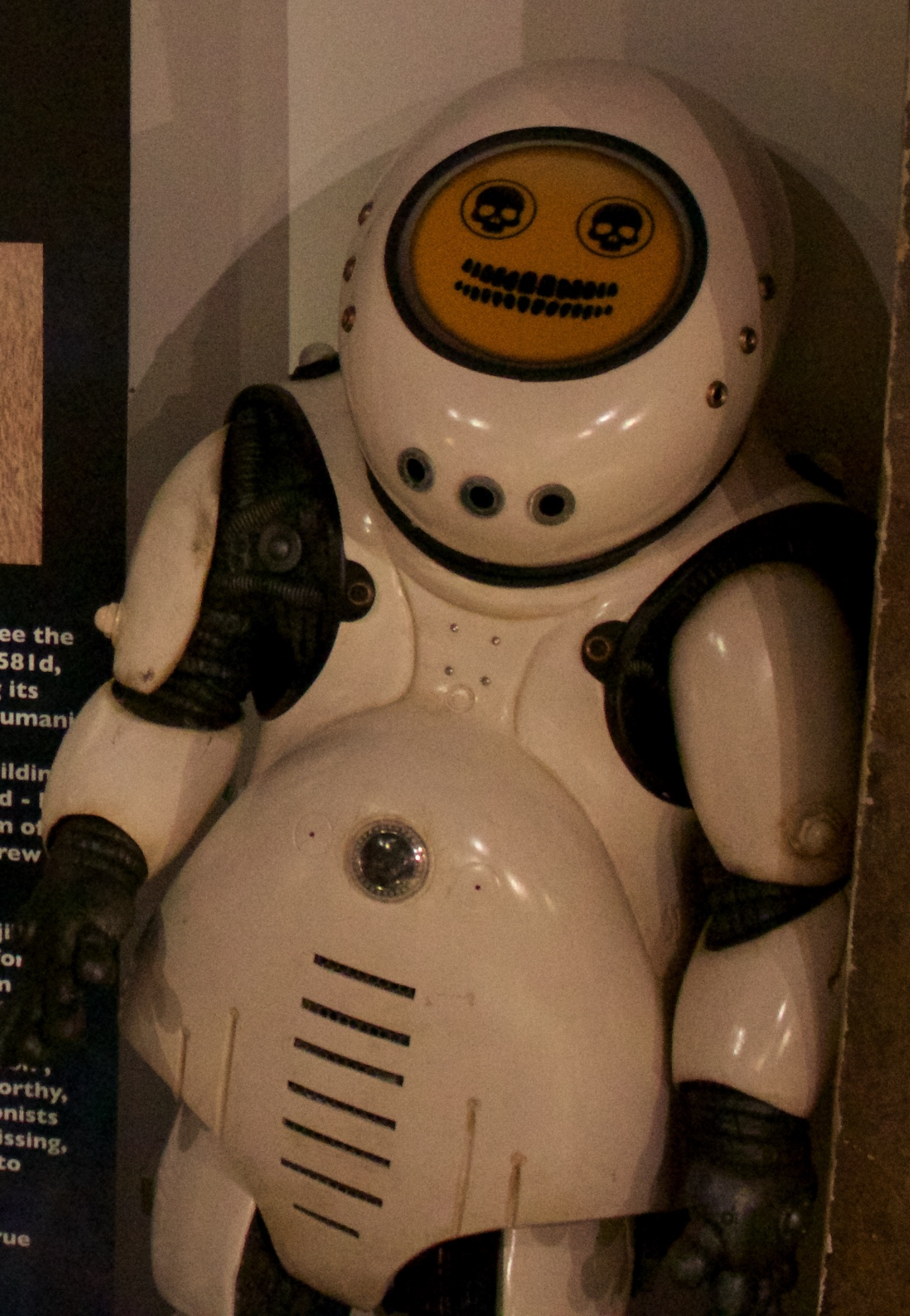
The Emojibots, on display at a Doctor Who exhibition.

The Doctor suspects they have arrived before the full colony ship is due, but remains curious as to the absence of any type of pre-colony crew preparing for their arrival. They discover the bones of these humans being used for fertiliser. The Doctor realises that if the Vardy sense they are not happy, the nanobots will consume them to their skeletons, and warns Bill to keep smiling as they escape. Resolving to destroy the Vardy before the arrival of the unsuspecting colonists, the Doctor locates the ship that brought the pre-colony crew to the planet and plans on overloading its reactor. However, Bill discovers a young boy who leads her to a large number of hibernation chambers including some humans just awaking; the Doctor realises that this is the colony ship.

The pair review the ship's logs from the non-hibernating flight crew. The Vardy were programmed to help construct and operate the colony and make the colonists happy, monitoring the emotional state of the colonists through the emotion badges and avatars. When one of the flight crew died of natural causes, it created grief among the crew, something the avatars were not programmed to register. The Vardy took this as a sign of disease and killed those who displayed unhappiness. This created a "grief tsunami" which rapidly wiped out the flight crew, and will likely wipe out the waking colonists when they discover what happened.

The colonists believe they must combat the Vardy to protect their hibernating crew, while the Vardy start to show the beginnings of sentience through self-defence. Failing to dissuade them from fighting, the Doctor resolves the situation by "resetting" the Vardy to their original state, before they saw grief as a disease. The Doctor offers to help negotiate between the colonists and Vardy to avoid the same mistake. Later, the Doctor and Bill return to Earth, but find themselves on the frozen Thames as an elephant looks on.

=== Continuity ===
The Doctor mentions that there are many Scotlands in space, all striving for independence. This was previously mentioned in "The Beast Below" (2010).

The Doctor warns Bill not to look at his browser history, the same order he gave to Osgood in "The Zygon Inversion" (2015).

=== Outside references ===
The colony ship is named Erehwon, based on the work Erewhon: or, Over the Range by Samuel Butler; the story is of a man that finds a seemingly idealistic society but then turns away when he discovers there are harsh penalties for even slight offences. References are made to two songs, "Ashes to Ashes" by David Bowie and "Any Old Iron", made famous by Harry Champion.

== Production ==
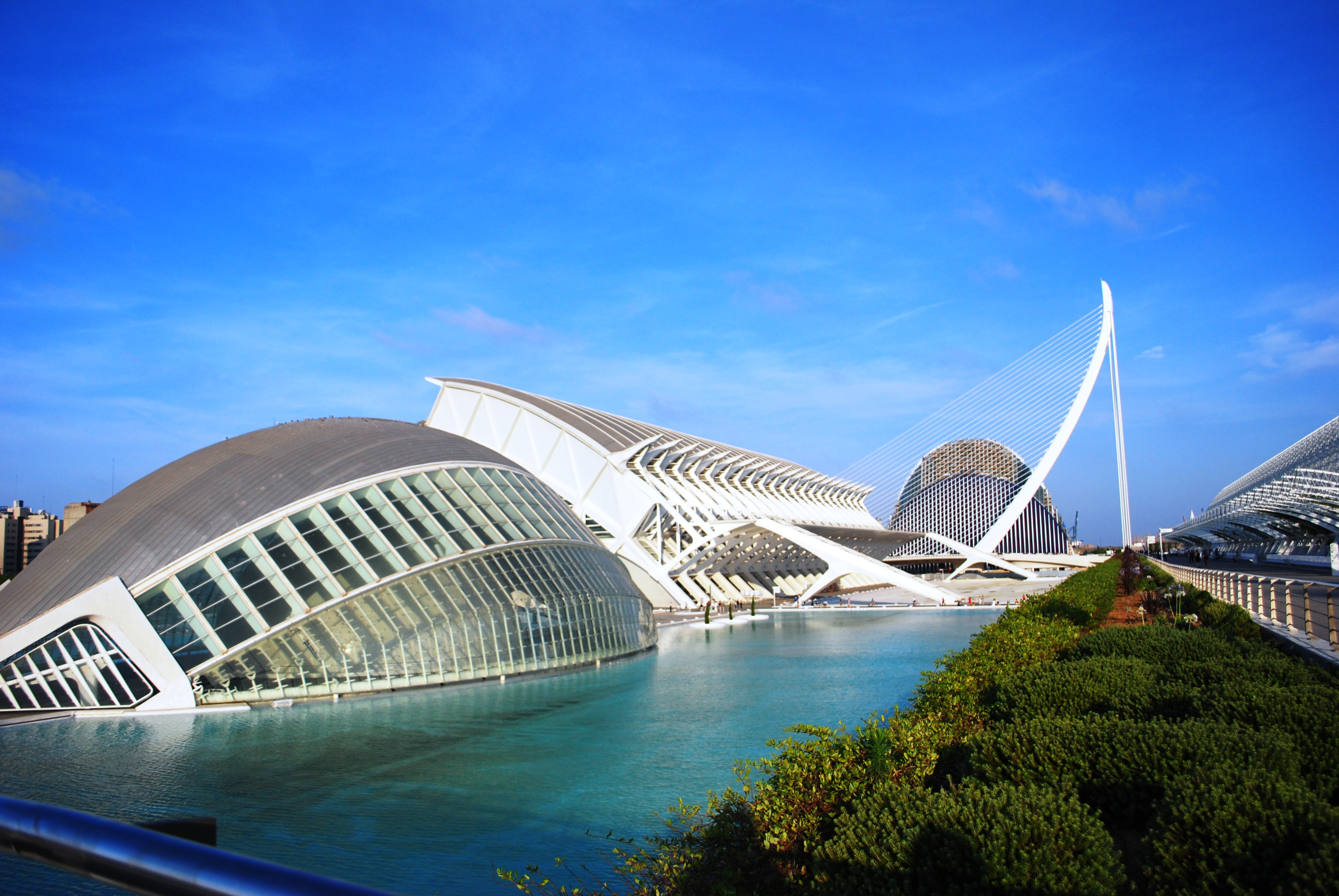
The City of Arts and Sciences in Valencia, Spain

The read-through for this episode and the previous episode, "The Pilot", took place on 14 June 2016. Filming for these episodes began on 20 June 2016 and concluded on 28 July 2016.

The Vardy are named after Andrew Vardy, a professor of swarm robotics at Memorial University of Newfoundland. Vardy once worked on a short story with Cottrell-Boyce based on his robotics research.

Location filming took place at the City of Arts and Sciences in Valencia, Spain.

== Broadcast and reception ==
The episode was watched by 4.25 million viewers overnight, a slight decrease from the opener for the series, and came fourth in the ratings behind Britain's Got Talent, All Round to Mrs. Brown's and the FA Cup. The episode received 5.98 million views overall and received an Appreciation Index score of 83.

=== Critical reception ===
Professional ratings
Aggregate scores
Source	Rating
Rotten Tomatoes (Tomatometer)	84%
Rotten Tomatoes (Average Rating)	6.8/10
Review scores
Source	Rating
The A.V. Club	B+
Entertainment Weekly	B
SFX Magazine	3/5 stars
TV Fanatic	4/5 stars
IndieWire	B+
IGN	8.6
New York Magazine	3/5 stars
Radio Times	2/5 stars

On Rotten Tomatoes, 84% of 19 reviews are positive. The website's consensus reads: "Though moments verge on the ridiculous and portions are bland, "Smile" grows compelling, fun, and chilling when focusing on two leading characters hanging out for much of the episode".

Alasdair Wilkins of The A.V. Club awarded the episode a "B+", crediting Frank Cottrell-Boyce's improved writing and stating Cottrell-Boyce "acquits himself far better here than in the season eight misfire 'In the Forest of the Night'". He went on to say "The Doctor and Bill's growing friendship and Bill's character in particular are the real joys of 'Smile'".

Writing for IGN, Scott Collura also praised the Doctor's relationship with Bill, stating he's "totally sold on this new Doctor/Bill dynamic at this point, and this season's new direction as well." He also took into consideration the themes and undertones of the episode "dropping some fairly heavy thematic material into the mix as well". He awarded the episode a score of 8.6, considered "great".

In a review for the Radio Times, Patrick Mulkern was critical of the show's slow pace and "leaden anticlimax." Mulkern did note that the production was "extraordinarily beautiful" and the robots were "terribly cute" and well-designed. He also praised the performance of Capaldi and Mackie as "hugely watchable" although her character was "more lightly sketched" than it had been in the previous episode. Mulkern thought that the story "presents interesting ideas but, as drama, is as bland and insipid as emojis themselves."
