= Jamie Mathieson =

British television screenwriter (born 1970)

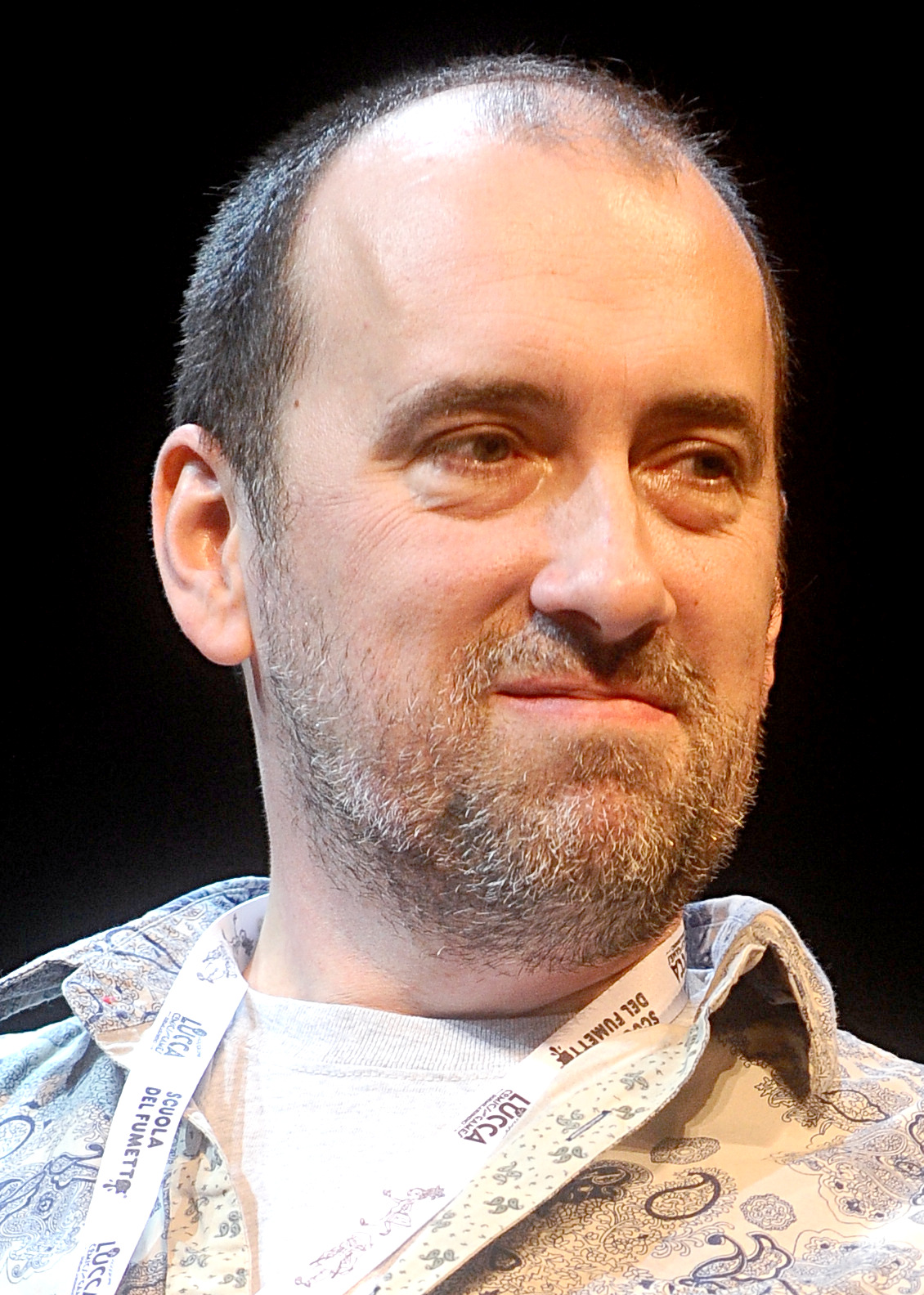
- Jamie Mathieson at Lucca Comics and Games 2015
- Born: Jamie Alan Mathieson; May 1970 (age 56)
- Occupation: Television scriptwriter
- Relatives: Daz Mathieson (brother)
- Writing career
- Genre: Science fiction
- Notable works: "Mummy on the Orient Express", "Flatline", "Oxygen"
- Website: www.jamiemathieson.com

Jamie Alan Mathieson (born May 1970) is a British television screenwriter. A former stand-up comedian, he has written for a number of UK science fiction TV shows, including Being Human, Dirk Gently and Doctor Who.

== Career ==
Mathieson's earliest television work during the early 2000s included writing material for Catchphrase and Family Fortunes, as well as a 2005 episode of My Parents are Aliens. In 2008, he scripted the sci-fi comedy film Frequently Asked Questions About Time Travel, starring Chris O'Dowd, Dean Lennox Kelly, Marc Wootton, and Anna Faris. It was released in the UK and Ireland on 24 April 2009. He wrote the drama pilot ALT for Channel 4 in 2014, but it was not picked up for a series. Following this, he successfully piloted and wrote the sci-fi miniseries Tripped for E4.

It was announced in October 2014 that Mathieson would be the lead writer of French science fiction series Métal Hurlant: Origins, a sequel to Métal Hurlant Chronicles. It is based on the popular comics anthology magazine Métal Hurlant, known in the United States as Heavy Metal and in Germany as Schwermetall.

Mathieson wrote for Doctor Who during the tenure of Peter Capaldi as the Doctor, writing four episodes (one co-written with then-showrunner Steven Moffat) across series 8, 9 and 10. Mathieson's work for the show garnered significant critical and fan acclaim; he was voted the best writer of series 8 in a 2015 Doctor Who Magazine reader's poll, and his first contribution to air, "Mummy on the Orient Express", concurrently topped its poll for the series' best episode. It additionally came third in the magazine's 2023 poll of the best Twelfth Doctor stories, with two of his other four episodes, "Flatline" and "Oxygen", immediately following it in fourth and fifth. Mathieson pitched ideas for the show's eleventh series, but was turned down by new showrunner Chris Chibnall.

In 2023, Mathieson independently published his first book, the short story collection The First Ten. The same year, he confirmed his intention to write a second collection, titled The Second Ten.

== Writing credits ==
Production	Notes	Broadcaster/distributor
My Parents are Aliens	Series 7: Episode 14 - "The Tail Of The Knitted Map" (2005)	ITV
FAQ About Time Travel	Feature film (2009)	Picturehouse Entertainment
Becoming Human	Series 1: Episode 4 (2011); Series 1: Episode 5 (2011); Series 1: Episode 6 (2011)	BBC iPlayer
Dirk Gently	Series 1: Episode 3	BBC Four
Being Human	"Educating Creature" (2010); "Type 4" (2011); "The Graveyard Shift" (2012); "Pie and Prejudice" (2013)	BBC Three
Alt	TV Movie (2014)	N/A
Tripped	Series creator (2016)	E4
Doctor Who	"Mummy on the Orient Express" (2014); "Flatline" (2014); "The Girl Who Died" (with Steven Moffat) (2015); "Oxygen" (2017)	BBC One
