= Oxygen (Doctor Who) =

269 – "Oxygen"
- Doctor Who episode

Cast
- Doctor: Peter Capaldi – Twelfth Doctor
- Companions: Pearl Mackie – Bill Potts; Matt Lucas – Nardole
- Others: Kieran Bew – Ivan; Justin Salinger – Tasker; Peter Caulfield – Dahh-Ren; Mimi Ndiweni – Abby; Katie Brayben – Ellie

Production
- Directed by: Charles Palmer
- Written by: Jamie Mathieson
- Produced by: Nikki Wilson
- Executive producers: Steven Moffat; Brian Minchin
- Music by: Murray Gold
- Series: Series 10
- Running time: 45 minutes
- First broadcast: 13 May 2017

Chronology
← Preceded by "Knock Knock"	Followed by → "Extremis"

"Oxygen" is the fifth episode of the tenth series of the British science fiction television series Doctor Who. It was written by Jamie Mathieson and broadcast on 13 May 2017 on BBC One.

The Doctor (Peter Capaldi), Bill Potts (Pearl Mackie) and Nardole (Matt Lucas) investigate a space station after receiving a distress call sent by it, but find that the station is infested with a crew of walking dead. The trio need to base their plans on how much oxygen they have left, when they find themselves in a seemingly hopeless situation.

== Synopsis ==
The Twelfth Doctor, Bill and an angry Nardole travel in the TARDIS to follow a distress call to a deep-space mining station. When the TARDIS is jettisoned by the station's computers, the trio are forced to wear "smartsuits", robotic spacesuits capable of independent operation tied to the station. The suits are also the only source of oxygen, as the mining company does not provide an oxygen atmosphere inside the station, and every activity is measured in breaths. The surviving crew warn them that some suits have received instructions to "deactivate" their "organic components", killing the wearer via an electrical discharge but remaining autonomous. This signal can be carried by touch, which has caused most of the crew to be turned into zombies, enslaved to the suits' programming. The Doctor and the others plan to walk outside the station to an uncompleted portion not updated in the computer systems to hide. Bill's suit malfunctions during depressurisation and forces her to remove her helmet. To save her, the Doctor gives her his helmet as they spacewalk. He survives the vacuum of space, but has gone blind from the ordeal.

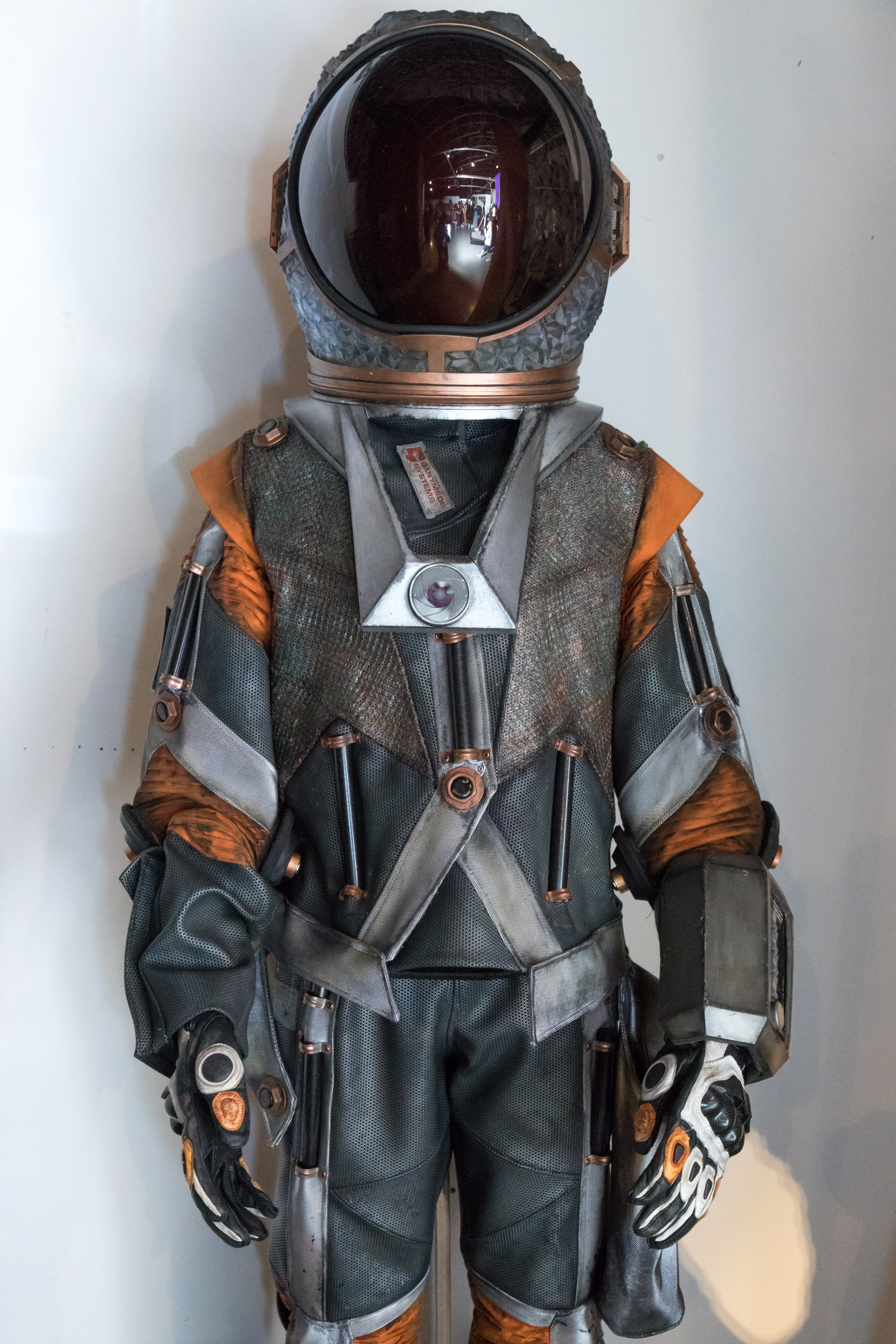
The spacesuit, on display at a Doctor Who exhibition

The computer discovers their location, but as they flee, Bill's suit again malfunctions and will not move, nor will it allow the others to carry it or release her. The Doctor leaves her behind, assuring her she will not die. She is, however, electrocuted when the zombies touch her. The Doctor reveals the limit of breaths is an algorithm to stop people "wasting" oxygen, part of the company's automated profit-making system; killing the wearers was just the logical endpoint of corporate profit over human life. He hacks the station's systems to cause the station to self-destruct if they are killed, and convinces the others this is a "good death" and revenge against the corporation. The computers recognise this threat to corporate profits and recalculate the suits' programming, and the zombies turn over their oxygen supplies to the survivors. The Doctor then revives Bill, knowing that her malfunctioning suit did not have enough power to lethally shock her.

The TARDIS is recovered, and they drop the survivors off at their head office to confront the company; the Doctor notes there was a revolution six months later. Nardole restores the Doctor's eyes, but when they return to the university and Bill departs, the Doctor confesses to Nardole that he is still blind.

=== Continuity ===
The Doctor tricks Nardole into believing that removing a fluid link will disable the TARDIS, when in fact it does not. In the 1963 story The Daleks, the First Doctor does the same thing to Ian Chesterton, forcing them to investigate a Dalek city to recover the materials needed to fix it.

=== Outside references ===
The episode opens with the Doctor saying "Space, the final frontier". This is the opening line in the title sequence of the original Star Trek science fiction television series, which ran from 1966 to 1969.

The Doctor quotes 1 Corinthians 15:55 when he says "Death, where is thy sting?"

== Production ==
The read-through for "Oxygen" took place on 12 October 2016. The episode was filmed as part of the fourth production block alongside the tenth episode of the series, "The Eaters of Light". Shooting began on 17 October and ended on 18 November 2016.

Jamie Mathieson's initial plan for an episode for the show's tenth series would have had the Doctor mistaken for Matthew Hopkins, the Witchfinder General. Moffat found the story too dark, and Mathieson wrote "Oxygen" instead. In his newsletter, Jamie Mathieson revealed that "Oxygen" was originally intended as a prequel to his 2014 episode "Mummy on the Orient Express". In earlier drafts, Kline, a corporate representative, appears on a monitor to offer the characters promotions and stock options if they will spare the ship. Recognising Kline's voice, the Doctor takes the crew to safety by TARDIS, destroying the ship as they leave. It is revealed that the company behind the mining station will one day have a subsidiary specialising in analysing ancient weaponry, and that Kline will be fired as a result of his fumbling the negotiation, living on only as the voice of the company computer, Gus.

The assistant director for the series, Lauren Pate, plays the student who questions the Doctor in the opening scenes.

== Broadcast and reception ==
The episode was watched by 3.57 million overnight. The episode received 5.27 million views overall, and it received an Appreciation Index score of 83.

=== Critical reception ===
Professional ratings
Aggregate scores
Source	Rating
Rotten Tomatoes (Average Score)	8.4/10
Rotten Tomatoes (Tomatometer)	100%
Review scores
Source	Rating
The A.V. Club	B+
Entertainment Weekly	B+
SFX Magazine	4.5/5 stars
TV Fanatic	4.5/5 stars
IGN	8.1
New York Magazine	4/5 stars
Radio Times	3/5 stars
Daily Mirror	4/5 stars

"Oxygen" received positive reviews from critics. 100% of 12 reviews are positive on Rotten Tomatoes, with an average score of 8.4/10. The consensus on the website states, "Ambitious and critical, 'Oxygen' is a showcase of writer Jamie Mathieson's deep understanding of what makes Doctor Who work."

Zoe Delahunty-Light of SFX Magazine gave the episode a rating of 4.5 stars out of 5, complimenting the idea of oxygen becoming a limited resource, and how the idea related to every plot point of the episode, rather than being an excuse for the tense situations. She also praised Pearl Mackie's portrayal of Bill in the episode, Mackie's acting being "consistently honest, raw at times, and never, ever whimsy", and her "death" scene being "guttural" and "heart-wrenching".

Scott Collura of IGN gave an 8.1, admiring the continuation of standalone stories in the tenth series and the work involving the spacesuits keeping the Doctor and the other characters alive, but also noting the controversial aspect of capitalism that was investigated throughout the episode, stating that "this time around the resolution feels a little pat, even if the underlying themes of the episode might resonate strongly for certain viewers." He also stated that the most dramatic scenes of the episode, Bill's "death" and the Doctor's blindness, did not land as solidly as he'd thought that they should have.

Ross Ruediger of New York magazine wrote a positive review, giving the episode 4 stars of 5. He praised the writer for his mature script, stating that "Jamie Mathieson writes great, thought-provoking Doctor Who episodes and "Oxygen" is no exception." He then went on to compliment the production values, expressing his view that the production team delivered amazing imagery to complement the intense script of the episode.

Patrick Mulkern of Radio Times gave the episode 3 out of 5 stars, praising the story for its truthfulness to the fundamental themes of the show, but criticizing it for lack of novelty, articulating his "struggle with the central conceit that in the future, in space, oxygen will be a commodity that you pay for dearly, even with your life." He also noted how the episode borrowed themes from other fictional films, such as Gravity (2013) and Alien (1979), as well as themes from previous episodes of the programme.

== Bibliography ==
- Ainsworth, John (2018). "Oxygen - Extremis - The Pyramid at the End of the World". Doctor Who: The Complete History. 87 (269). Panini Comics, Hachette Partworks.
