= Great Frost of 1683–84 =

Severe winter weather in England

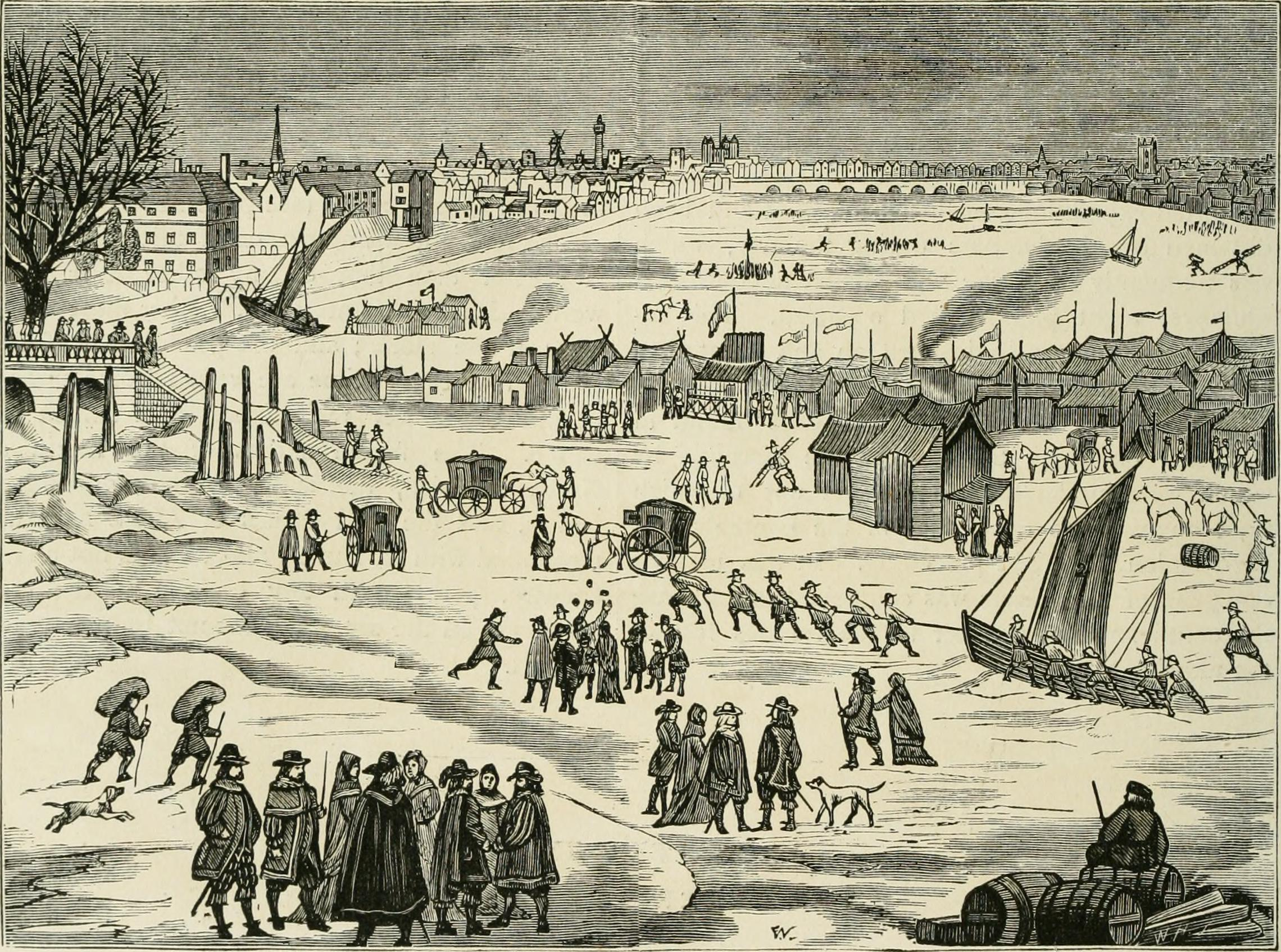
The frost fair of 1683-1684

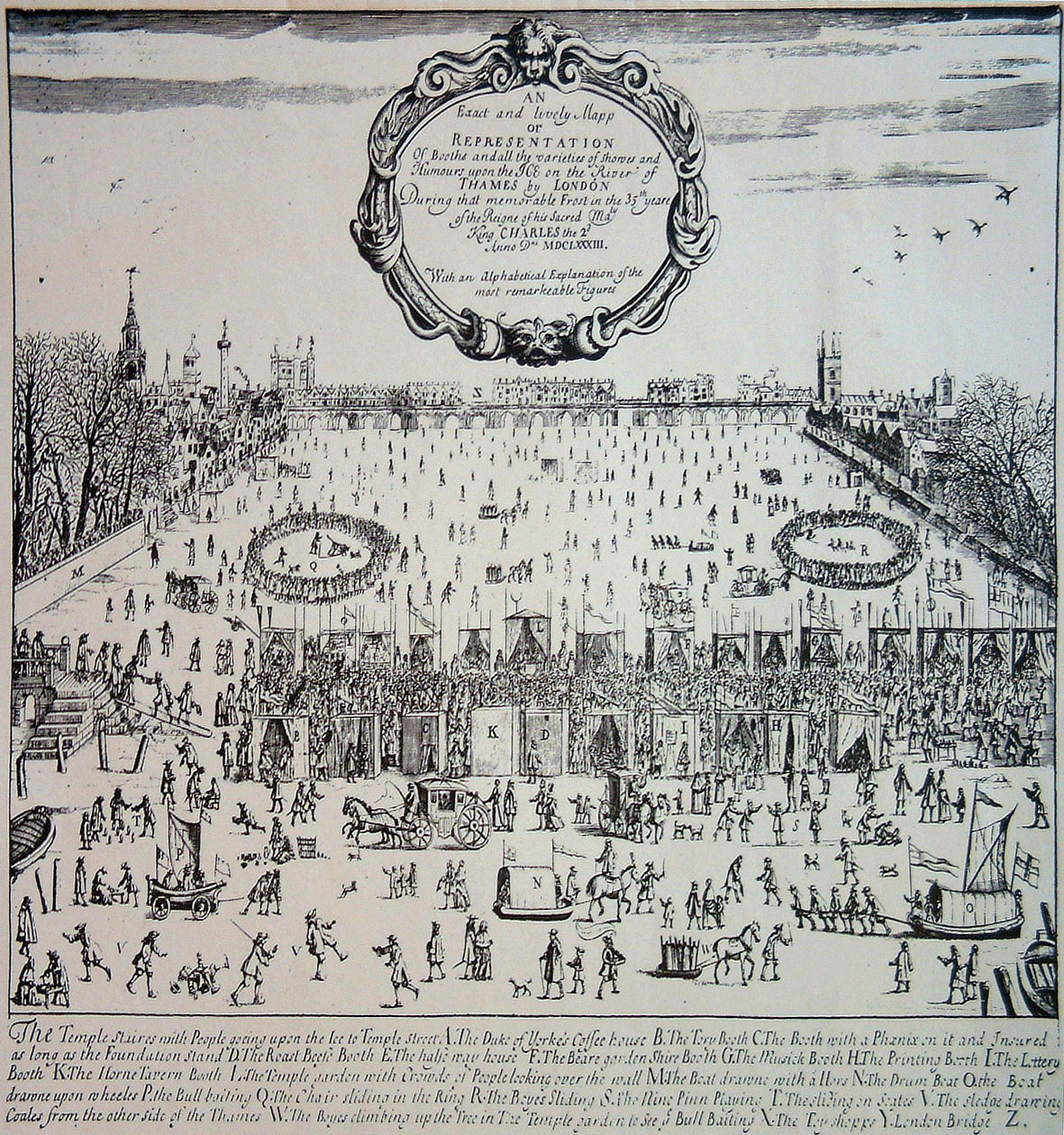
Frost Fair of 1683 (1841 image)

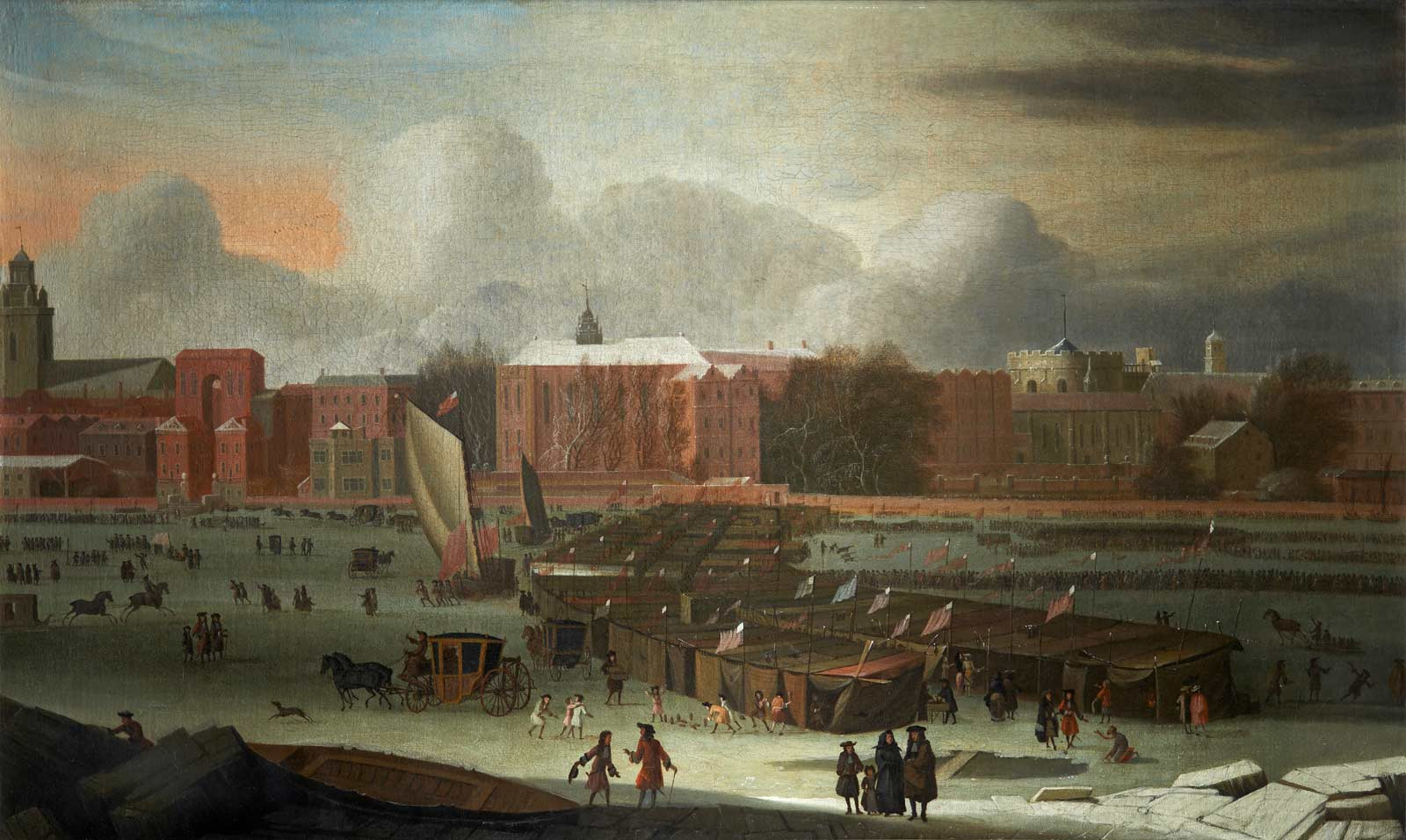
Contemporary painting by Abraham Hondius of the Frost Fair of 1683–84

The Great Frost of 1683–1684 was a frost across England, reported as the worst in its history. During the Frost, the surface of the River Thames was reported as frozen to the depth of one foot (30 cm). The Great Frost enabled one of the River Thames frost fairs. Entertainment on the frozen Thames as result of the Great Frost began the career of Chipperfield's Circus. A Great Frost Fair was also held in Leeds, when the River Aire froze solid for a month allowing a fair with an ox-roast and sports to take place, as described by Ralph Thoresby.
