= Bill Potts (Doctor Who) =

Fictional character from Doctor Who

- Doctor Who character
- Pearl Mackie as Bill Potts
- First appearance: "The Pilot" (2017)
- Last appearance: "Twice Upon a Time" (2017)
- Created by: Steven Moffat
- Portrayed by: Pearl Mackie

In-universe information
- Species: Oil creature Cyberman (formerly); Human (originally)
- Gender: Female
- Occupation: Canteen assistant Student
- Affiliation: Twelfth Doctor
- Significant other: Heather
- Origin: Bristol, England
- Home: Earth

Billie "Bill" Potts is a fictional character in the BBC science fiction television series Doctor Who, created by Steven Moffat and portrayed by Pearl Mackie. Bill serves as a companion of the Twelfth Doctor (Peter Capaldi), an incarnation of the alien time traveller known as the Doctor, from the tenth series premiere "The Pilot" (2017) to the 2017 Christmas special "Twice Upon a Time".

Within the series's narrative, Bill is a canteen worker at St Luke's University in Bristol who becomes the Doctor's student after impressing him with her curiosity. After her romantic interest Heather is absorbed by sentient alien oil, the Doctor invites Bill to travel with him through time and space. Bill encounters numerous alien threats during the series, but is converted into a Cyberman in "World Enough and Time" (2017). She retains her humanity and, after helping the Doctor defeat the Cybermen, is reunited with Heather, who transforms her into an oil-like being so the two can travel the universe together. The Doctor later meets a sentient construct of Bill's memories in "Twice Upon a Time". Mackie also reprised the role in the online minisode "The Best of Days" (2020).

Bill was created by Moffat to succeed Clara Oswald (Jenna Coleman) as the Doctor's companion. Named after actress Billie Piper, the character was conceived as an inquisitive non-white woman who has a student-teacher dynamic with the Doctor. She is also the series's first openly gay companion. Mackie's performance was positively received by critics, and Bill was described as refreshing compared to previous companions. Reaction to her departure from the series was mixed.

== Appearances ==
=== Television ===
Bill Potts is introduced in the tenth series premiere, "The Pilot". She was raised by a foster mother, Moira (Jennifer Hennessy), after her biological mother (Rosie Jane) passed away. Bill works as a canteen assistant at St Luke's University in Bristol, where she attends the Twelfth Doctor's (Peter Capaldi) physics lectures despite not studying there. Impressed by Bill's curiosity, the Doctor takes her under his wing and begins tutoring her. Bill's romantic interest, Heather (Stephanie Hyam), is absorbed by a puddle of sentient alien oil discovered on the university campus. She transforms into an oil-like "Pilot" which can manifest in different liquids through the universe, and begins to pursue Bill. The Doctor helps Bill escape in his time machine, the TARDIS, but Bill realises that Heather is only offering her the opportunity to travel throughout the universe with her. Bill rejects Heather, and she departs, leaving her tears on Bill's face.

Bill accepts the Doctor's offer to travel through time and space with him. This draws criticism from Nardole (Matt Lucas), who insists the Doctor stay in Bristol to guard its underground Vault. In subsequent episodes, Bill learns about the Doctor’s Time Lord nature and is introduced to the Vault's sole inhabitant: Missy (Michelle Gomez), a female incarnation of a Time Lord formerly known as the Master.

In the two-part series finale, "World Enough and Time" / "The Doctor Falls", Bill joins the Doctor, Nardole and Missy in responding to a distress signal from a Mondasian colony ship near a black hole. A frightened crew member impulsively shoots Bill, but Mondasians carry her 400 miles to the other end of the ship where she is revived. Due to time dilation from the black hole, ten years pass for Bill whilst minutes pass for the Doctor. She is manipulated by an earlier incarnation of the Master (John Simm) and converted into a Cyberman before the Doctor can reach her. Bill temporarily retains her humanity and helps the Doctor and Nardole protect the Mondasians from the Cybermen in a violent battle. Bill cries on seeing the Doctor's unconscious body. Heather emerges from a pool of water, having found Bill through her tears, and transforms Bill into an oil entity like herself. The couple return the Doctor's body to the TARDIS before leaving to explore the universe together.

In "Twice Upon a Time", Bill appears as a Testimony avatar—a sentient construct of her memories harvested at the moment of her death. Though the Doctor is initially sceptical of her nature, this "Bill" provides him with companionship and returns his memories of Clara Oswald (Jenna Coleman).

The Thirteenth Doctor (Jodie Whittaker) referenced Bill when confronting a Cyberman in the 2020 story "The Haunting of Villa Diodati", stating "I will not lose anyone else to that!" In the 60th anniversary special episode "The Giggle", The Toymaker (Neil Patrick Harris) depicts Bill as a marionette alongside former companions, taunting the Fourteenth Doctor (David Tennant) by reminding him of the companions' fates.

=== Other media ===
Before her premiere episode was broadcast, Bill Potts made a small appearance in the Doctor Who Magazine comic story "The Daft Dimension", published May 2017. In April 2017, three Doctor Who novels were released featuring Bill: The Shining Man, Diamond Dogs and Plague City.

Paul Cornell's 2018 novelisation of "Twice Upon a Time" details Bill's life after the events of "The Doctor Falls". Bill and Heather explore the Milky Way together, until Bill suggests they become human again. The couple spend time together on Earth, living by the sea, and grow old. On her deathbed, Bill tells Heather to leave her and resume her astral form. Bill dies and becomes part of Testimony. When it encounters the Doctor, Testimony temporarily restricts Bill's access to her later memories so she can interact with the Doctor as he knew her; this limitation is lifted at the end of the story.

Mackie reprised the role in the online minisode "The Best of Days" (2020) for Doctor Who: LOCKDOWN, which takes the form of voicemails between Bill and Nardole. In the minisode, Bill and Heather have broken up after settling back on Earth, though the omniscient Heather states that they will ultimately get back together. Bill references the COVID-19 lockdowns, expresses hope for social change and wonders if she will encounter the Doctor again.

== Development ==
=== Casting ===
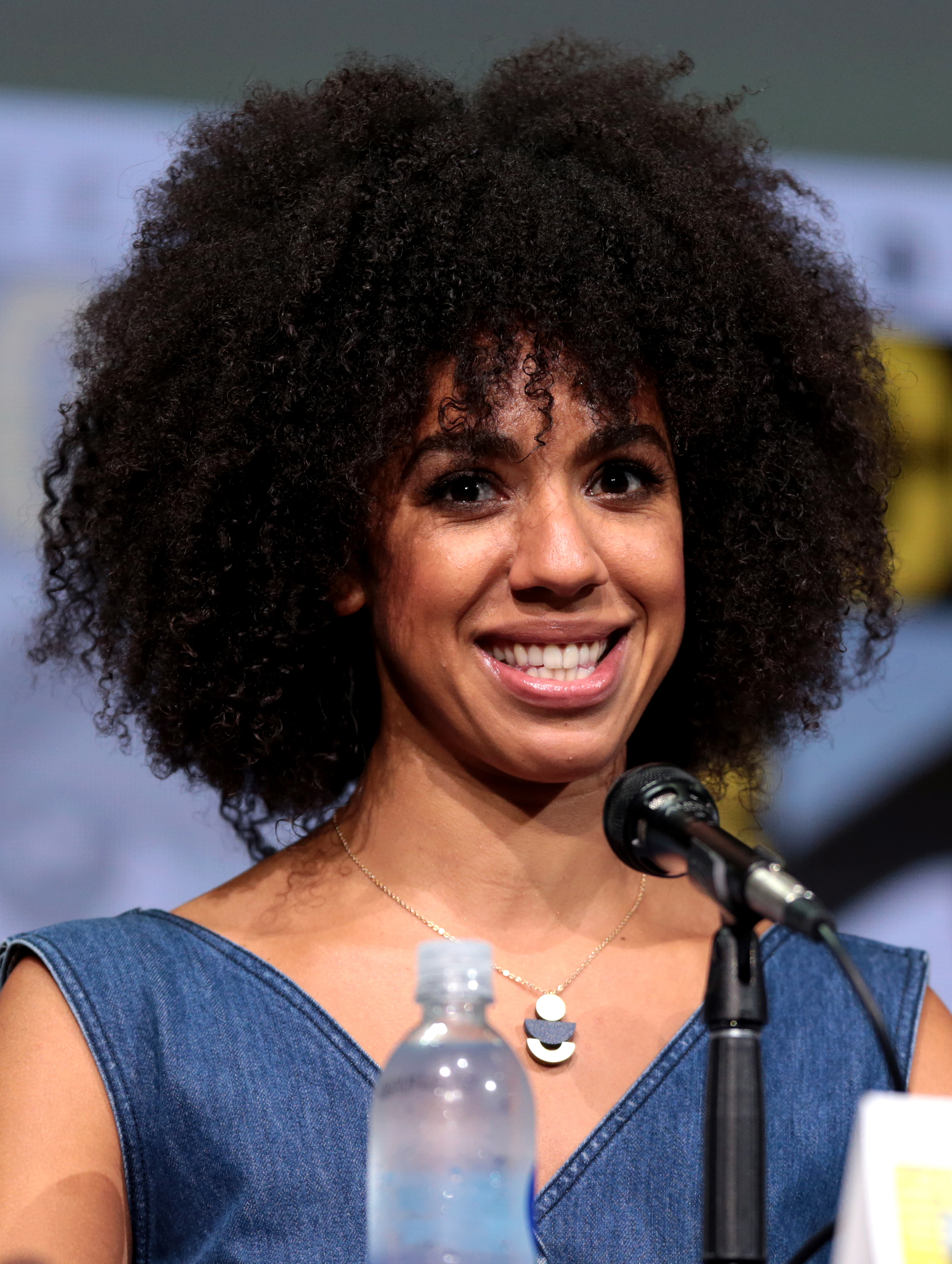
Pearl Mackie portrays Bill Potts.

In March 2016, actress Pearl Mackie was cast as Bill Potts, the newest companion of the Twelfth Doctor (Peter Capaldi) in the BBC series Doctor Who. To avoid leaks while casting the character, the production team used the codename "Mean Town", an anagram of "Ten Woman"; this referenced the upcoming tenth series, and also that Bill would be the tenth companion of the revived series. Doctor Who showrunner Steven Moffat discouraged Mackie from reviewing earlier episodes, stating that "Bill doesn’t know anything. It would be nice for you to learn with her." The Doctor Who production team were mindful of recent comments made by comedian Lenny Henry that he "rarely saw a black face" in BBC dramas. Moffat and the production team "decided that the new companion was going to be non-white and that was an absolute decision because we need to do better on that".

On 23 April, Bill was introduced as the Doctor's new companion in a promotional clip which screened on BBC One during the semi-final half-time of the 2015–16 FA Cup. Titled "Friend from the Future", it featured Bill and the Doctor in an encounter with a Dalek. The clip was filmed in secrecy at Roath Lock Studios on 13 April. Though Moffat was initially unsure of the clip's canonicity or whether it would be included in the series itself, he ultimately incorporated parts into Mackie's debut episode "The Pilot" (2017).

Mackie regularly appeared as Bill throughout series 10. In "World Enough and Time" (2017), Bill is converted into a Cyberman. Her Cyberman form is portrayed by Liam Carey, though she often appears on screen in her human form, reflecting her own perspective—a dramatic technique Moffat took from the series Quantum Leap (1989–1993). Bill departed the series in the finale episode "The Doctor Falls" (2017).

Moffat had not included Bill in draft scripts of the 2017 Christmas special "Twice Upon a Time", but realised that the story lacked a companion character and texted Mackie to ask if she would return. On 23 July 2017, it was announced at the Doctor Who panel at San Diego Comic-Con that Mackie would return as Bill for "Twice Upon a Time", though not for the eleventh series.

=== Characterisation ===
[Bill's sexuality] was just part of who she was, and not the most interesting part. For people to see a mixed-race woman, a woman of colour, being completely comfortable with being a lesbian on a global prime-time series is phenomenally important. People have come up to me and said that watching Bill helped them come out to their families. I didn't anticipate that it would ever have that kind of impact.

— Mackie in 2017

The character shares a name with William "Bill" Hartnell, who played the First Doctor (and whose wife, like Bill's girlfriend, was named Heather), though Moffat has said that this was coincidental. The character's name was inspired when Moffat overheard David Tennant offhandedly call out to Billie Piper by the name Bill on the set of "The Day of the Doctor" in 2013. On what the character's name is short for, Moffat stated in May 2016 "Billie, I’m thinking. Unless I change my mind."

Moffat "wanted [the new companion] to be somebody who asked a different bunch of questions of the Doctor," stating that Bill's self-awareness, irreverence and willingness to call out the Doctor were her key qualities. He also wanted her to be funnier and more talkative than the Doctor's preceding companion Clara Oswald (Jenna Coleman). The dynamic between Bill and the Doctor was influenced by the play Educating Rita, which centres on the relationship between a young working-class woman and her middle-aged tutor. Unlike previous companions, Bill is a science fiction fan and thus points out various tropes to both the Doctor and the audience.

Shortly after Mackie was cast, Moffat decided that her audition script would have worked better if the character discussed a girl she fancied rather than a boy. As a result, Bill is the series's first openly gay companion. (Note: The Doctor had previously travelled with LGBT characters such as Jack Harkness, River Song and Jenny Flint but they were not deemed "full-time" companions.) British press were quick to sensationalise this fact. Speaking at a press launch, Moffat stated to journalists: "You just did a headline out of someone being a fairly average person. What are you talking about? It is important that we don’t make a big fuss about this in a children’s show, which communicates directly with children."

Mackie helped choose Bill's costume, which was influenced by her own tastes. Additionally the production team liked the afro she sported at her audition, and kept it for the character.

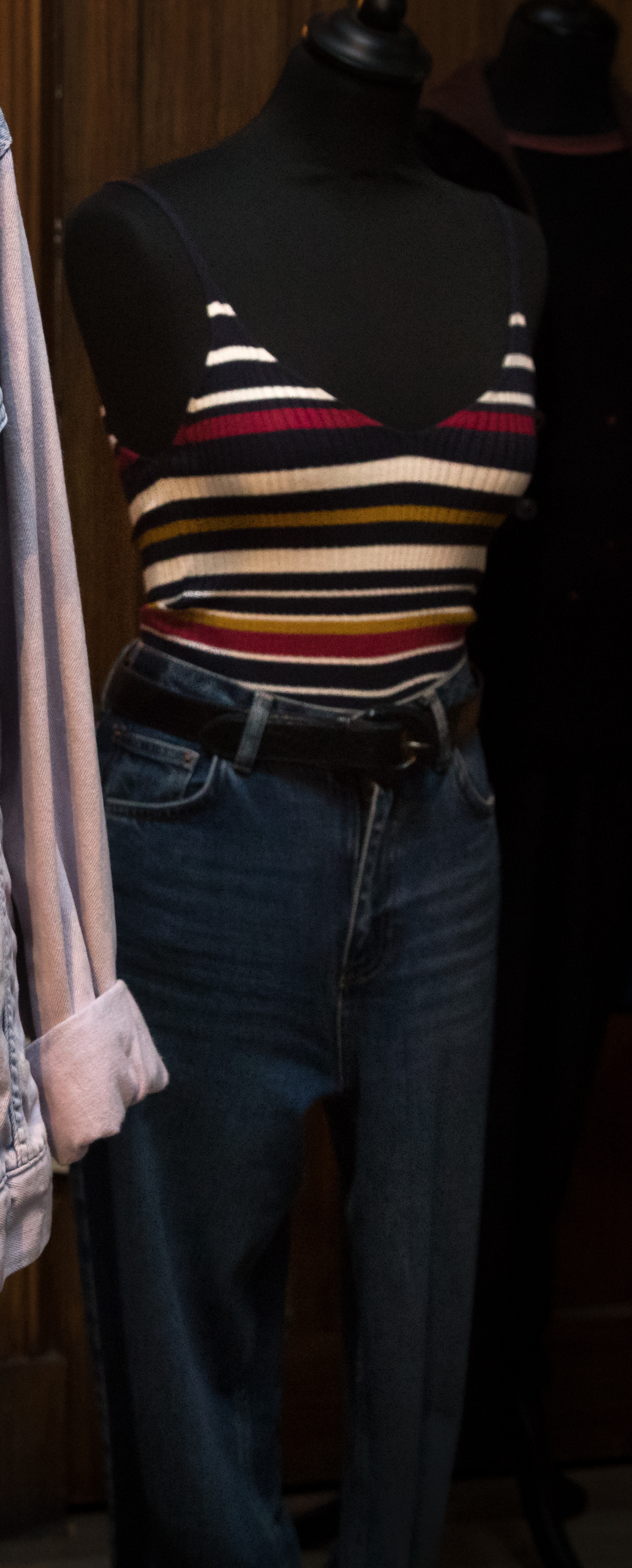
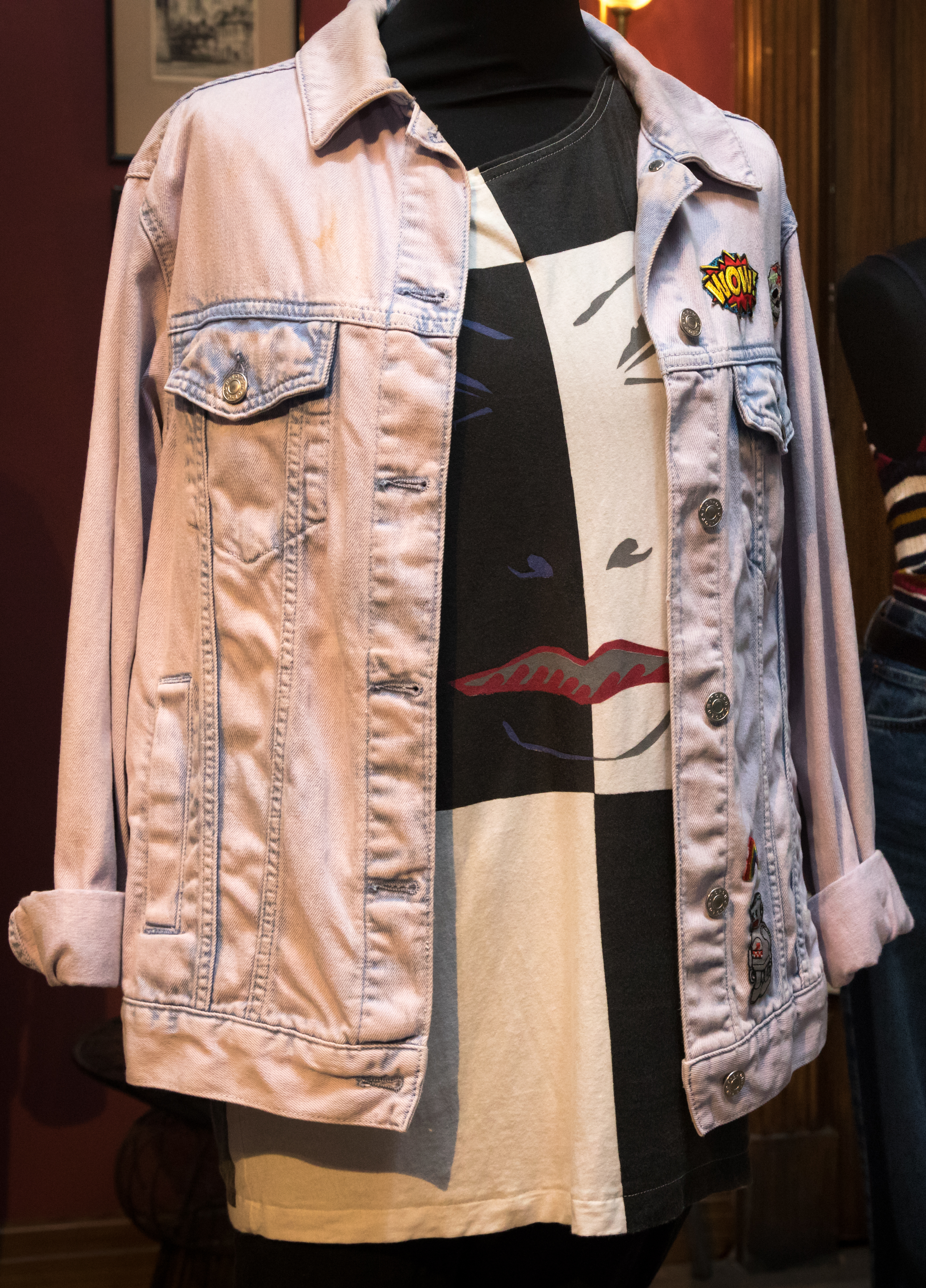
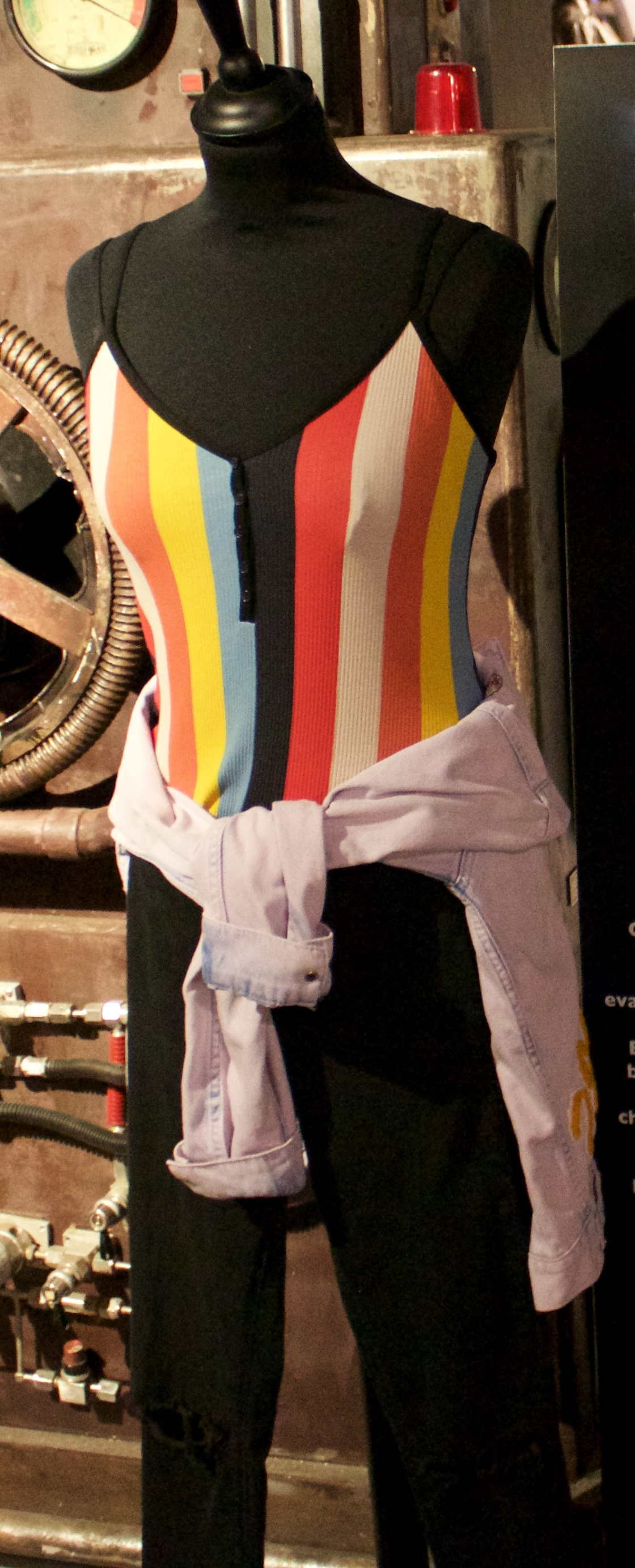
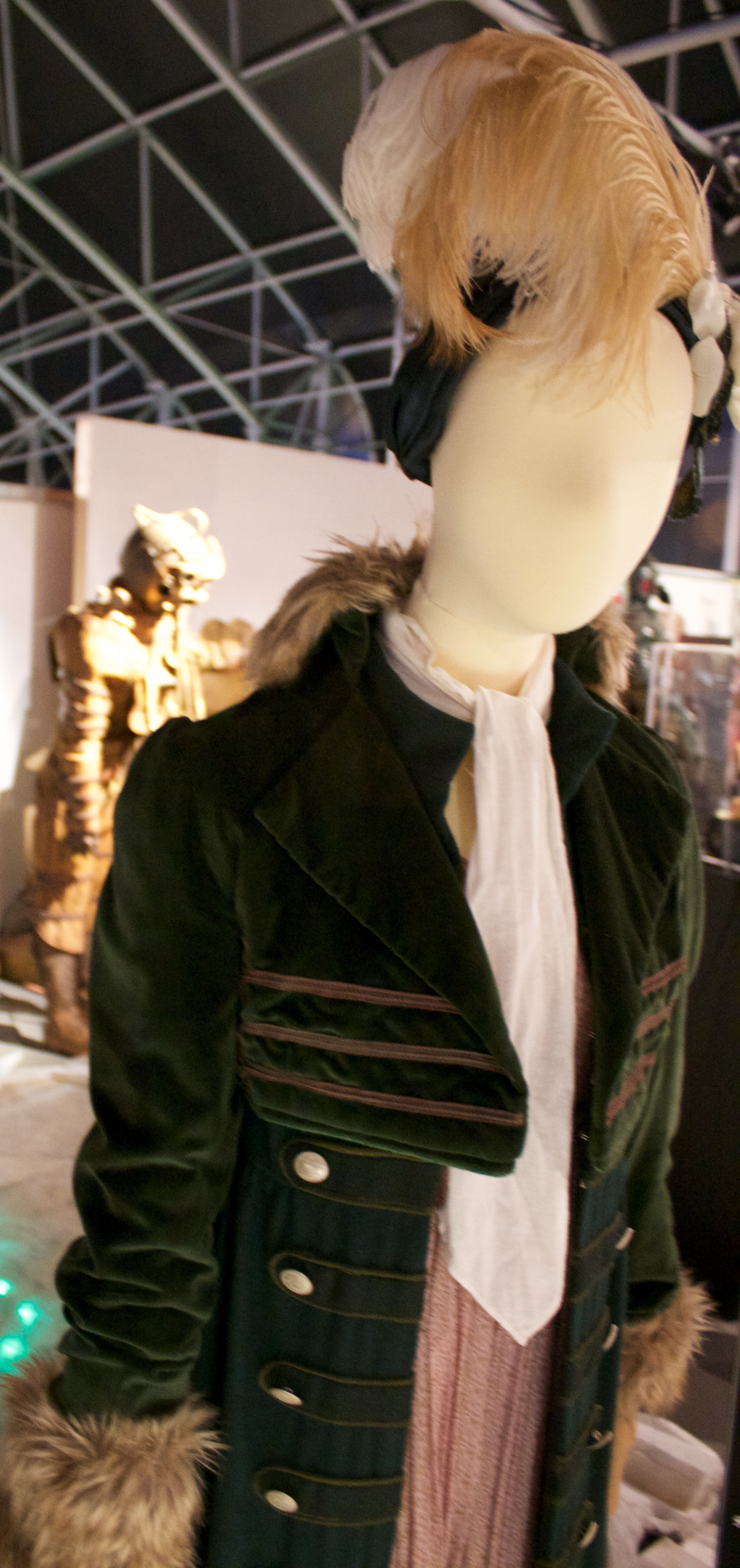
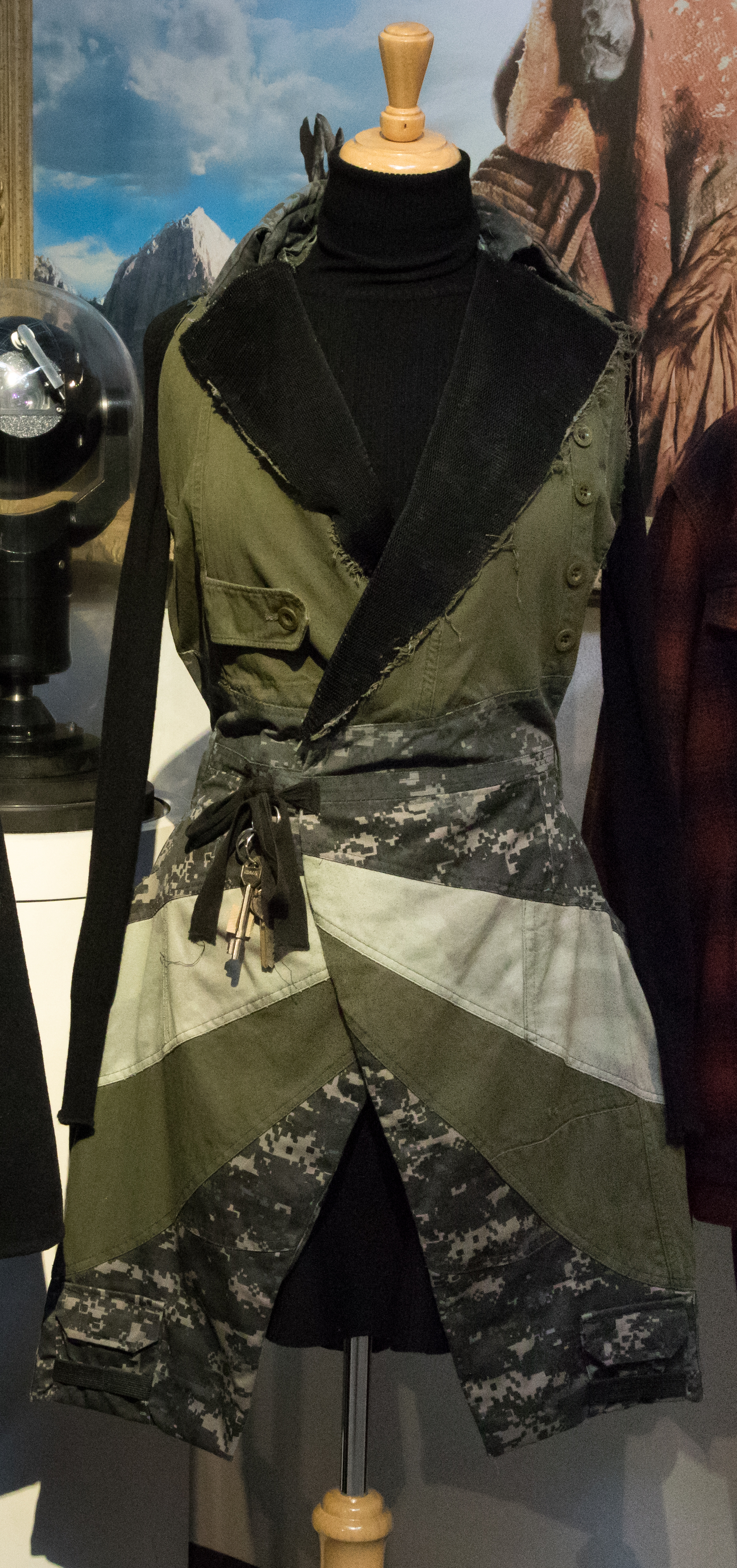
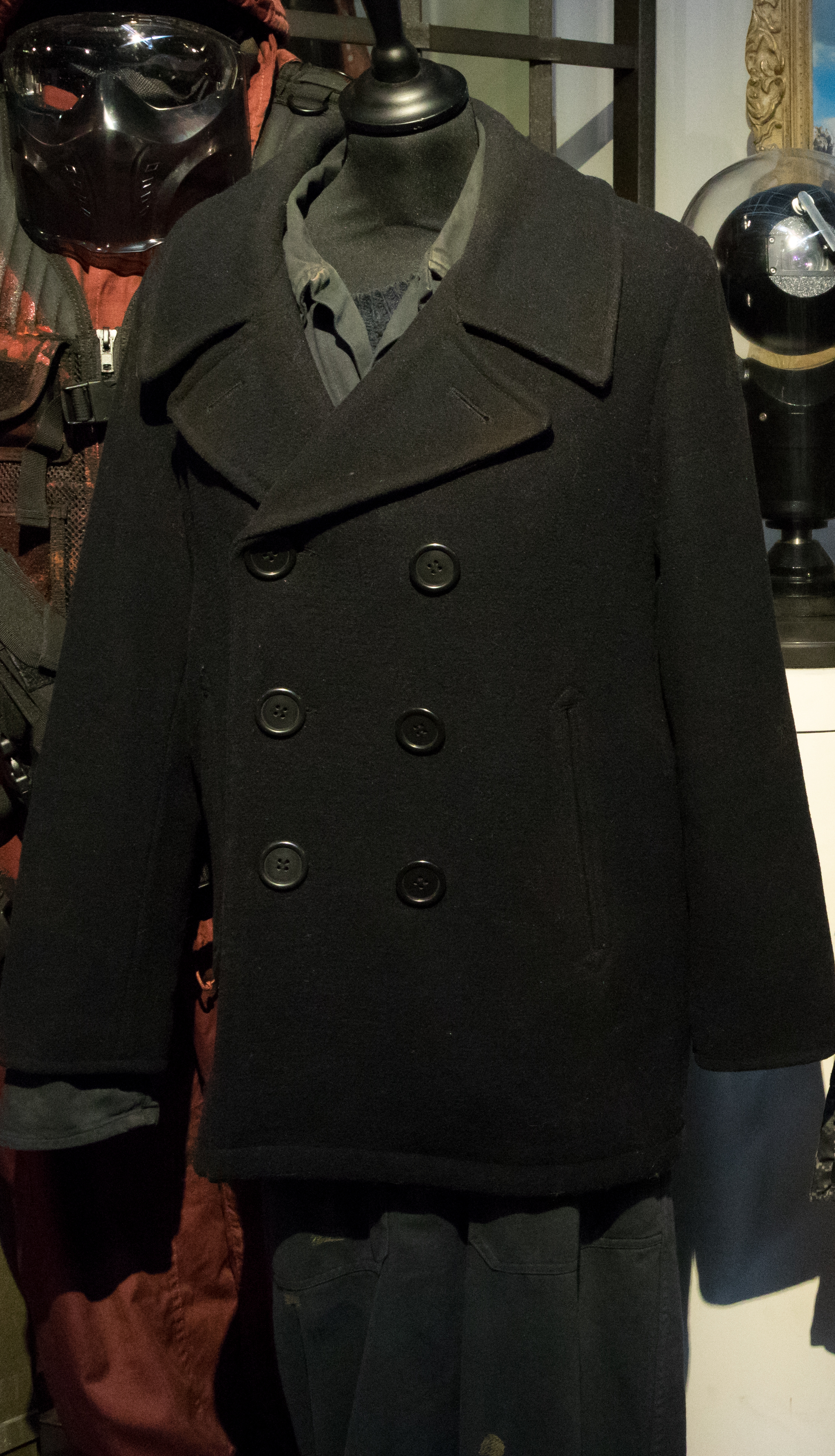
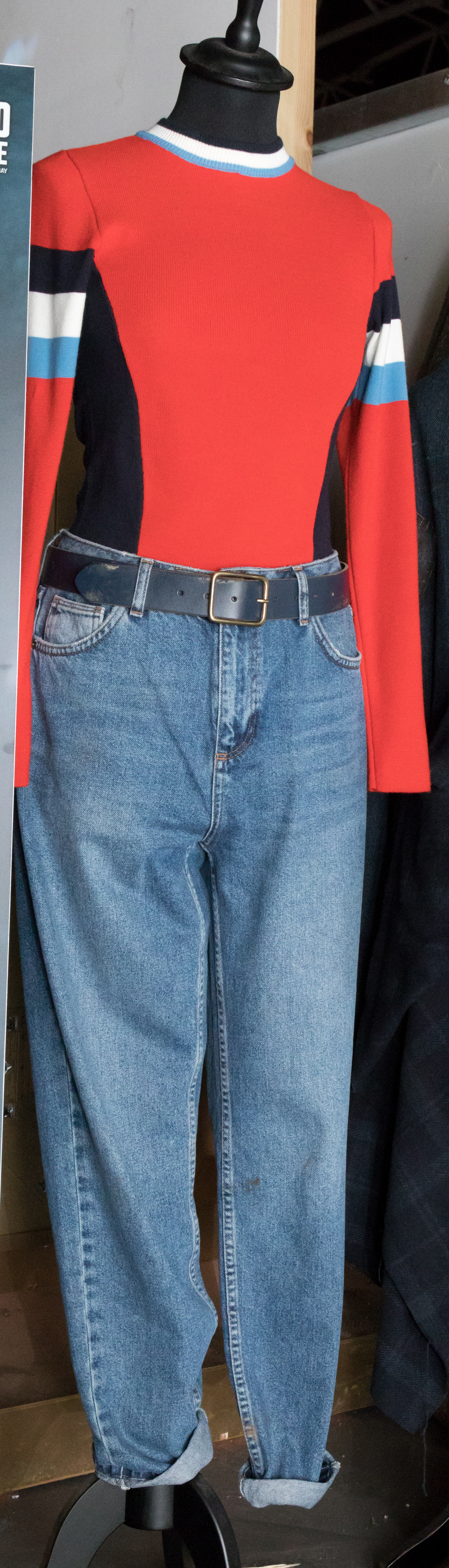
Costumes worn by Bill during the series, on display at the Doctor Who Experience

== Reception ==
Following the broadcast of "The Pilot", Bill was met with a largely positive response from fans and critics. Patrick Mulkern of Radio Times described Pearl Mackie as "instantly winning as fledgling companion Bill". Den of Geek's Simon Brew praised Mackie's performance and noted that Bill was distinct from previous companions. Huw Fullerton of Radio Times noted her "instant chemistry" with Capaldi. Martin Belam of The Guardian wrote that Bill's "infectious on-screen enthusiasm" revitalised the series and bringing out "a deeper warmth" in the Twelfth Doctor. Teresa Jusino, writing for The Mary Sue, described Bill as an equal to the Doctor: "There’s no gendered hierarchy here. It doesn’t feel like a mentor/mentee relationship, nor does the Doctor’s mission and life feel More Important than Bill." Catherine Gee of The Telegraph gave a more negative review, stating that Mackie "lacked the charismatic spark of Jenna Coleman" and that Bill was a "muddle", but praised Bill's working-class background as offering a contrast to the largely middle-class British drama landscape.

Critics contrasted Bill's portrayal as a working-class everywoman with the more "regal" middle-class Clara Oswald, who preceded Bill as a companion in the series. Hanh Nguyen of IndieWire stated that "after a companion like Clara, whose very existence was tied to The Doctor... it was refreshing to meet Bill". The Daily Telegraph's Catherine Gee echoed similar sentiments, stating that her "ordinariness" compared to Clara or other past companion Amy Pond contributed strongly to her success with viewers. Craig Elvy of Screen Rant praised Bill's "refreshingly honest and human" reaction to time travel in comparison to Clara and Amy. Vanity Fair's Joanna Robinson noted that Bill avoided the "will they won't they" dynamic with the Doctor that had characterised Amy and Clara. She also likened Bill with companions Donna Noble and Ace McShane. Valerie Estelle Frankel, in the book Women in Doctor Who: Damsels, Feminists and Monsters, noted Bill's popularity and relatability with teen fans of the series, positively highlighting her role in the series as an equal to the Doctor, such as in "The Lie of the Land" (2017) in which her emotional memory and love of her mother was used to defeat an alien machine that the Doctor's analytical brainpower could not. In an article for The Guardian, Leanne Mattu analysed Moffat's depiction of Bill as a woman raised in foster care, believing it would help shine light on those with a foster care background.

After the broadcast of "The Doctor Falls", Brew called Bill "one of the absolute triumphs of the series" but criticised the unexpected reappearance of Heather for undermining Bill's storyline. Maya Philips of Vulture ranked Bill #7 in a 2018 ranking of the revived series's 10 companions. She applauded Bill's characterisation and fresh dynamic with the Doctor, but criticised her "ridiculous" exit from the series. Many critics similarly found Heather's return to be a weak resolution, noting her lack of appearance throughout the preceding series. Despite this, Elvy noted that Bill and Clara had similar departures from the series, but considered Bill's the stronger of the two.

Belam, in another article for The Guardian, commended Moffat's effort to "create more diverse female roles" and called Bill "genuinely fresh" despite concerns about Moffat writing a lesbian character. Jusino agreed that Moffat handled the character's sexuality better than previously introduced LGBT characters Vastra and Jenny Flint. Lynette Porter, in the book Being a Girl with The Doctor: Essays on the Feminine in Doctor Who, described Bill as being a significant lesbian role model for fans of the series, and was widely influential and popular as a result. Many journalists and academic studies cited on-screen representation as beneficial to the series's viewers. However, she also noted that Bill's limited screentime with Heather and the couple falling into the negative stereotype of "lesbians as monsters"—Bill becomes a Cyberman and Heather becomes sentient oil— was detrimental given the limited representation of recurring lesbian characters within the series. Kelly Fiveash of Ars Technica described the Doctor's tutoring of working-class Bill as "somewhat quaint and patronising", and criticised Heather and Bill's relationship for playing into lesbian tropes. Saffron Alexander, writing for The Mary Sue, criticised a scene in "Oxygen" (2017) where Bill is called racist after being surprised by a blue-skinned alien. Alexander argued that previous companions had reacted similarly without being criticised, and felt the "sneering" scene was out of character for Bill. Constance Gibbs, writing in the book Adventures Across Space and Time: A Doctor Who Reader, similarly criticised the scene where Bill is shot and killed as having negative real-world connotations due to the crew member being blue, which aired at a time when a Blue Lives Matter countermovement was active and after "Oxygen" depicted another blue-skinned alien accusing Bill of being racist. She also noted these negative connotations came following many other significant black characters in the series, such as Mickey Smith and Martha Jones, also being treated poorly within the show's narrative.
