= Doctor Who series 8 =

2014 series of British sci-fi TV series

Doctor Who
- Series 8
- DVD box set cover art
- Showrunner: Steven Moffat
- Starring: Peter Capaldi; Jenna Coleman
- No. of stories: 11
- No. of episodes: 12

Release
- Original network: BBC One
- Original release: 23 August – 8 November 2014

Series chronology
- ← Previous; 2013 specials Next → Series 9

The eighth series of the British science fiction television programme Doctor Who began on 23 August 2014 with "Deep Breath" and ended with "Death in Heaven" on 8 November 2014. The series was officially ordered in May 2013, and led by head writer and executive producer Steven Moffat, alongside executive producer Brian Minchin. Nikki Wilson, Peter Bennett and Paul Frift served as producers. The series is the eighth to air following the programme's revival in 2005, the thirty-fourth season overall, and the first series since series five not to be split into two parts.

The series is the first to star Peter Capaldi as the Twelfth Doctor, an alien Time Lord who travels through time and space in his TARDIS, which appears to be a British police box on the outside. It also stars Jenna Coleman as his companion, Clara Oswald. Also playing a major recurring role in the series is Samuel Anderson as Danny Pink, Clara's boyfriend. The main story arc revolves around a mysterious woman called Missy (portrayed by Michelle Gomez), who is often seen welcoming people who have died throughout the series to the "Promised Land", a place that serves as an apparent afterlife to deceased characters.

Steven Moffat was directly involved with the writing of seven episodes; he received sole credit for four episodes, and was credited as a co-writer for the remaining three. Other writers who worked on this series included Phil Ford, Mark Gatiss, Stephen Thompson, Gareth Roberts, Peter Harness, Jamie Mathieson (who wrote two), and novelist Frank Cottrell-Boyce. Directors of the series included ones who had previously worked with Moffat on the show, and brand new ones. Filming began on 6 January 2014 and lasted exactly seven months, ending on 6 August.

The series premiere was watched by 9.17 million viewers, the highest ratings for a premiere since Matt Smith's first episode as the Doctor back in 2010. Ratings remained consistent throughout the course of the series, seeing a low of 6.71 million viewers with the episode "Flatline", and ended with 7.60 million people watching the finale (up 150,000 viewers from the previous season finale). The eighth series became the highest-rated series ever in the US with an average audience of 2.04 million viewers. Critical reaction to the series was highly positive, with praise going to the writing, directing, and acting, with a number of individual episodes receiving critical acclaim.

== Episodes ==
The first episode of the series, "Deep Breath", has a running time of 76 minutes, making it – at the time – the second-longest episode of the revived Doctor Who era beginning in 2005, the longest being "The Day of the Doctor" with a running time of 77 minutes (this episode was eventually beaten by "The Power of the Doctor", with its 88-minute runtime, in 2022). As with the previous series, Series 8 consists mainly of standalone episodes; the series finale was the first two-part story after "The Rebel Flesh" / "The Almost People" from the midpoint of Series 6 in 2011.

No. story	No. in series	Title	Directed by	Written by	Original release date	UK viewers (millions)	AI
242	1	"Deep Breath"	Ben Wheatley	Steven Moffat	23 August 2014	9.17	82
In Victorian London, a dinosaur spits out the TARDIS onto the banks of the River Thames. The newly-regenerated Twelfth Doctor, and Clara, emerge from the TARDIS. The Doctor rests at the Paternoster Gang's residence to recover. After the spontaneous combustion of the dinosaur, the Doctor and Clara take on the case of the dinosaur's death and similar recent human combustions. The Doctor and Clara are called to a restaurant, where they find it is part of a spaceship that crashed in the past and is filled with humanoid robots. Upon Clara's prompting, the robots' cyborg control node, the Half-Face Man, reveals that he is trying to reach the "promised land" and killed the dinosaur to use her as parts for his computer. The Doctor confronts the Half-Face Man, claiming the Half-Face Man does not want to continue his existence because of how many times his body was replaced. The Half-Face Man falls to his death from a hot-air balloon, and the other robots go lifeless. Unsure about continuing to travel with the new Doctor, Clara is convinced by a phone call from the Eleventh Doctor. Meanwhile, the Half-Face Man awakes in the promised land, greeted by a woman called Missy.
243	2	"Into the Dalek"	Ben Wheatley	Phil Ford and Steven Moffat	30 August 2014	7.29	84
Clara asks fellow Coal Hill School teacher and former soldier Danny Pink out for a drink. The Doctor brings Clara to the human rebel ship Aristotle to help the "good" Dalek Rusty, despite the Doctor's contention that Daleks cannot be turned good. The Doctor, Clara, and a team of rebels from the Aristotle are miniaturised and sent into Rusty. The Doctor repairs Rusty's power cell, but it reverts to its old way of thinking and forgets the memory of seeing the beauty of a star being born that had made it want to destroy the other Daleks. It sends a message to the Dalek mothership, giving the other Daleks the rebel ship's location. Clara awakens Rusty's memory of seeing the star being born. In an attempt to show Rusty the beauty of the universe, the Doctor connects his mind with Rusty's. Rusty, however, sees the Doctor's hatred for the Daleks, and decides to exterminate its own race. The Doctor turns down the surviving soldier Journey's offer to travel with him.
244	3	"Robot of Sherwood"	Paul Murphy	Mark Gatiss	6 September 2014	7.28	82
The Doctor and Clara meet the outlaw Robin Hood in Sherwood Forest. The Doctor wins a duel against Robin by knocking him into a river. Robin takes part in an archery contest against the Sheriff of Nottingham. The Doctor challenges Robin before blowing up the target. The Doctor allows the Sheriff's robot knights to capture him, Robin and Clara so he can learn more about the Sheriff's plans. The Doctor and Clara discover the Sheriff has been trying to repair a crashed spaceship and intends to repair its circuitry with the countryside's gold, so that he can take over the world. However, there is not enough gold to make orbit, and the damage to the engines would destroy half of England. Robin defeats the Sheriff in a duel by knocking him into a gold vat. Since Robin's arm is injured (and the Doctor cheated during the archery contest), the Doctor, Clara, and Robin work together to fire the golden arrow from the contest into the ship, which then climbs into orbit and detonates harmlessly. The Doctor admits that Robin will be remembered as a legend rather than as a man, and finds Maid Marian for him before departing.
245	4	"Listen"	Douglas Mackinnon	Steven Moffat	13 September 2014	7.01	82
After a failed date with Danny, Clara returns to her home to find the Doctor awaiting her. He seeks a creature he believes has perfected its ability to hide and is related to a childhood fear everyone has of a hand grabbing someone's leg from under the bed. Clara tries to home in on her childhood using the TARDIS' telepathic circuits, but lands at the children's home where Danny, as a boy called Rupert, grew up. The Doctor comforts Rupert from his fear when something under his bedspread scares him. After failing to apologise to Danny on the date, Clara is beckoned back to the TARDIS by time traveller Orson Pink. Clara is taken to the end of the universe where Orson's ship was stranded and the Doctor attempts to observe the hiding creature. When something on the ship knocks the Doctor out, Clara triggers the TARDIS' departure to a barn, where she finds a crying child. Hiding beneath the bed, she realises that the child is the Doctor. When the boy gets up, Clara accidentally grabs his leg. She comforts him with the Doctor's previous advice to Rupert. Orson is returned home, and Clara and Danny reconcile.
246	5	"Time Heist"	Douglas Mackinnon	Stephen Thompson and Steven Moffat	20 September 2014	6.99	84
The TARDIS' phone rings in Clara's apartment, and the Doctor and Clara find themselves in a strange chamber suffering from memory loss along with Psi the augmented human and Saibra the mutant human. They have been recruited by the Architect to rob the Bank of Karabraxos. The quartet collect the tools required for their heist, before witnessing a mysterious alien named the Teller melt the brain of a criminal with its psychic abilities. Saibra is later caught by the Teller and activates an atomic shredder to dissolve herself, and Psi soon follows her in the same manner. Clara and the Doctor gain access to the vaults of the bank to gain the rewards of their heist, and proceed to the Private Vault, after finding Psi and Saibra; the shredders were really teleporters. The Doctor regains his lost memories back from the Teller, revealing himself as the Architect, set up to rejoin the Teller with the only other one of its species, after the bank's director, Madame Karabraxos, regretted leaving the Teller's mate in the vault to die in a solar storm and phoned the TARDIS. The Teller frees its mate. The Doctor takes the two aliens away to live out their lives.
247	6	"The Caretaker"	Paul Murphy	Gareth Roberts and Steven Moffat	27 September 2014	6.82	83
Clara is trying to maintain two separate lives: one as the Doctor's companion, and the other as a schoolteacher in a relationship with Danny. The Doctor goes into deep cover as the caretaker at Coal Hill. Tracking the Skovox Blitzer, one of the deadliest machines created, he plans to displace it a billion years into the future where nothing else can be harmed. Danny accidentally tampers with the Doctor's trap, and the Skovox Blitzer is only sent 74 hours into the future. The Doctor learns of Danny's relationship with Clara, and Danny about Clara's double life. The Doctor believes that Clara made an error in dating a soldier. When the Skovox Blitzer rematerialises earlier than expected, the three work together to trick it into deactivating. Danny warns Clara about the Doctor pushing her into dangerous actions. A disintegrated community support officer awakens in the promised land, also called the Nethersphere, being greeted by Missy's assistant Seb.
248	7	"Kill the Moon"	Paul Wilmshurst	Peter Harness	4 October 2014	6.91	82
The Doctor takes Clara and her student Courtney on a trip. They arrive in 2049 on a Space Shuttle to the Moon with one hundred nuclear bombs. Noting the Moon's higher gravity and meeting Captain Lundvik, the Doctor questions her, where he's told that her team are on a suicide mission to blow up the Moon. A sudden mass high tide had threatened humanity's existence. Miners are found entombed in spider webs. The Doctor notices from the miners' photographs that the Moon is starting to break apart. A spider-like being attacks the group. The Doctor determines that the Moon is an egg, with the creature inside ready to hatch. The Doctor abandons them, forcing Lundvik, Clara, and Courtney to decide the fate of the creature. They let Earth's population decide; people of Earth vote to destroy the creature. Clara intervenes and stops the bombs' countdown, and the Doctor rescues them from the Moon. From Earth, they watch the creature hatch and the shell disintegrate, with the creature laying a new egg as a new Moon. Clara confronts the Doctor, claiming that it was his decision to make too. She leaves the Doctor, to be comforted by Danny.
249	8	"Mummy on the Orient Express"	Paul Wilmshurst	Jamie Mathieson	11 October 2014	7.11	85
Clara rejoins the Doctor for one last outing before she leaves the TARDIS and the Doctor. They arrive on a train which travels through space, which is modelled after Orient Express. The Doctor then discovers that an elderly woman called Mrs. Pitt has recently been murdered by a mummy only she could see. When other occupants die in the same way, the Doctor realises that the mummy, identified as a legendary entity called the Foretold, is invisible to all but the one about to die. Once it is seen, it kills its victim in exactly sixty-six seconds. The train's computer program, Gus, reveals to the Doctor that he has tasked him to capture the Foretold. The Doctor discovers that it is a dead soldier powered by phase-shifting technology with unfinished business. The Doctor discharges the soldier by surrendering, and the train's occupants are saved. The Doctor uses the phase-shifting technology to teleport the train's occupants to safety. After a conversation with the Doctor about whether or not he is really cold-hearted, Clara decides she is not ready to leave him yet, and they set off on further adventures together.
250	9	"Flatline"	Douglas Mackinnon	Jamie Mathieson	18 October 2014	6.71	85
Arriving in Bristol, the Doctor and Clara find the TARDIS has shrunk on the outside. Clara investigates the area, encountering a young graffiti artist named Rigsy, while the Doctor stays in the TARDIS until it has shrunk down to a handheld size, theorising that something was leaching its external dimensions. The Doctor tells Clara that the thing they are facing is an alien from a universe with two dimensions which is flattening people that went missing on Rigsy's estate. The creatures, known as the Boneless, can make 3D objects 2D. Clara, Rigsy, and community service people run from the Boneless into tunnels. The Doctor creates a device that can change the dimensions of objects similarly to the Boneless. The Doctor turns on Siege Mode to prevent the TARDIS from being damaged, but leaving him without enough power to deactivate Siege Mode. The Boneless have also learned to make themselves three-dimensional, and assume guises of the people they have flattened. Clara has Rigsy tricks the creatures into restoring the TARDIS by placing the TARDIS on the other side of a fake door Rigsy painted. The Doctor uses its power to send the Boneless back into their dimension.
251	10	"In the Forest of the Night"	Sheree Folkson	Frank Cottrell-Boyce	25 October 2014	6.92	83
Clara's student Maebh knocks on the TARDIS after hearing a thought from Clara to find the Doctor. The Doctor answers, and realises that a forest has grown over the world. Clara and Danny lead a group of students out into the new forest after a museum sleepover. They regroup in Trafalgar Square to recover Maebh. The Doctor realises Maebh is missing, and he and Clara set out to find her. They find Maebh. Some bug-like creatures talk through Maebh, telling them they had grown the forest and previous big forests. The Doctor believes a giant solar flare Maebh predicted in her notebook is heading towards Earth. Heading back to the TARDIS, the Doctor offers an escape route. Clara refuses to become the last of her kind, and Danny decides to stay with the students. The Doctor realises the trees have grown to protect Earth. Maebh reads off a message prepared by the other students to send a message to the world to not destroy the trees. Danny tells Clara he wants to know the truth about her travels with the Doctor and asks her to think about it first. The solar flare passes by harmlessly and the excess trees disappear.
252a	11	"Dark Water"	Rachel Talalay	Steven Moffat	1 November 2014	7.34	85
While Clara attempts to gain the courage to tell Danny about her life with the Doctor, Danny is killed. Clara attempts to blackmail the Doctor into saving Danny. The Doctor removes her from the dream state he placed on her and uses the TARDIS' telepathic interface to find Danny. The Doctor and Clara are brought to the 3W Institute, in which skeletons are contained in a blue liquid called "dark water" that hides the exoskeletons that support the skeletons. In an apparent afterlife called the Nethersphere, Danny is being consoled by Seb for his death. Missy greets the Doctor and Clara. The scientist Doctor Chang explains that the dead are conscious. Meanwhile, Missy awakens the skeletons and the tanks begin to drain. Clara talks with Danny, but Danny refuses to let her be with him in death. The skeletons are revealed to be Cybermen. Missy tells the Doctor that dying minds are uploaded to the Nethersphere—a Time Lord "hard drive"—where emotions are deleted and the mind is downloaded into Cyberman bodies. The Doctor and Missy exit and find themselves on the steps of St Paul's Cathedral. Missy reveals that she is the Master.
252b	12	"Death in Heaven"	Rachel Talalay	Steven Moffat	8 November 2014	7.60	83
Cybermen detonate themselves around the British Isles, to reincarnate and transform the dead into Cybermen with clouds that rain "Cyberpollen". Similar events occur all over the world. Danny is one of these Cybermen, and he rescues Clara. UNIT bring the Doctor and Missy aboard a plane, where the Doctor is inducted "President of Earth". Missy overpowers UNIT, kills Osgood, and blows up the plane. She reveals that she gave Clara the phone number to the TARDIS in the first place, telling her it was a tech support help line. The Doctor reunites with Clara and Danny in a graveyard. Danny reveals that a forthcoming rainfall will convert all living people into Cybermen. Missy arrives and gifts the Doctor with control of the Cybermen to prove he and Missy are the same. The Doctor refuses and gives control to Danny, who leads other Cybermen into exploding and stopping the rainfall. Missy claims the planet Gallifrey is in its original location. The Doctor threatens to kill Missy to prevent Clara from doing so herself. Missy is seemingly disintegrated by Brigadier Lethbridge-Stewart, reanimated as a Cyberman. Clara and the Doctor decide to part ways and bid farewell to each other, each with a lie: Clara tells the Doctor that Danny was brought back from the Nethersphere, and the Doctor tells Clara he has found Gallifrey.

== Casting ==
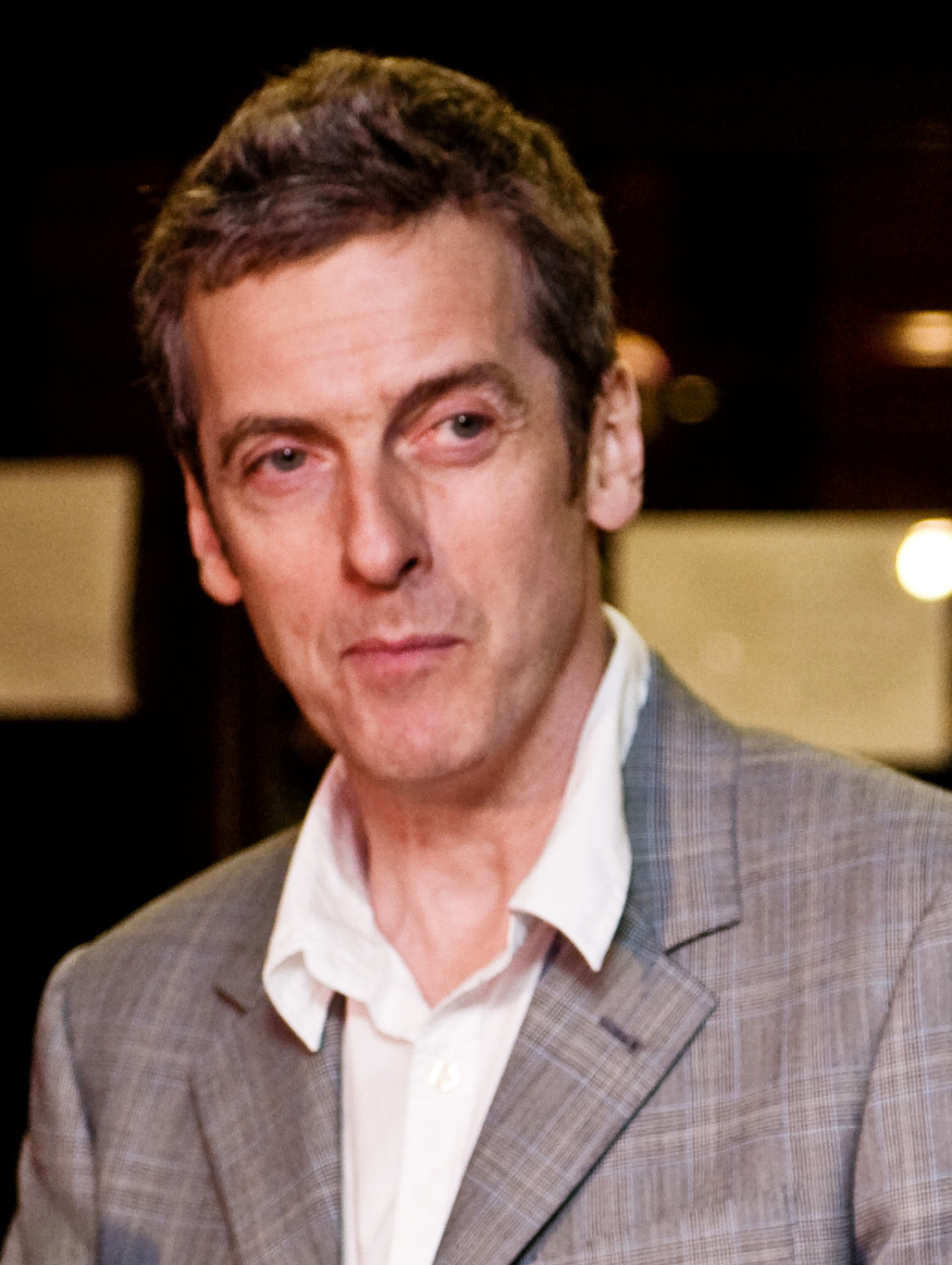
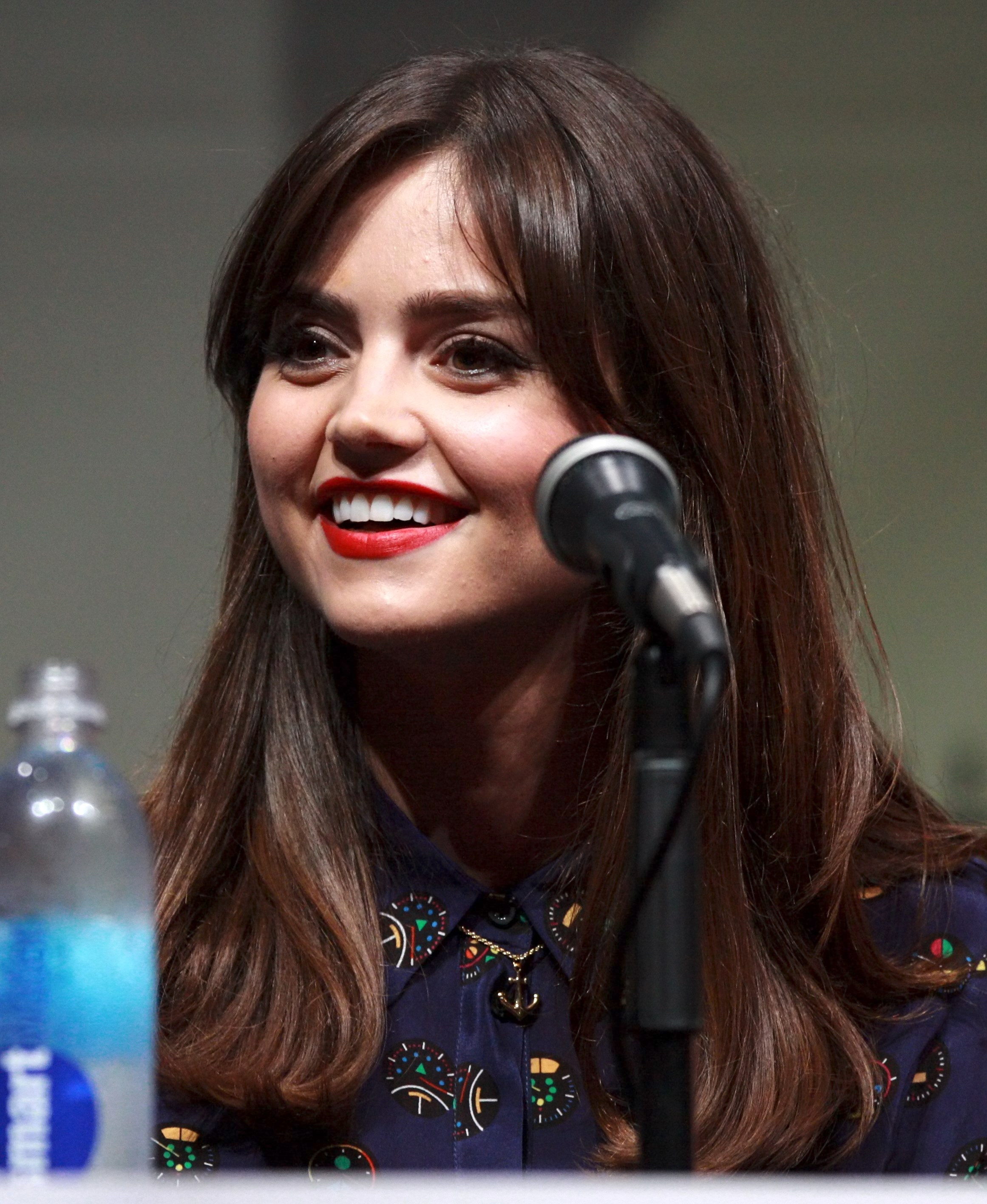
Peter Capaldi portrays the Twelfth Doctor in his first full series, while Jenna Coleman returns from the previous series as Clara Oswald.

The show's star from 2010, Matt Smith announced in June 2013 that he would be leaving Doctor Who following the 2013 Christmas episode "The Time of the Doctor". His replacement was announced, after several weeks of speculation, on a special live broadcast called Doctor Who Live: The Next Doctor on 4 August as Peter Capaldi, who up to that point was best known for portraying spin doctor Malcolm Tucker in the BBC comedy series The Thick of It. Capaldi had previously appeared on the show as Caecilius in "The Fires of Pompeii", as well as John Frobisher in the Doctor Who spin-off Torchwood: Children of Earth.

In October 2013, actress Neve McIntosh stated in an interview that recurring characters Madame Vastra, Jenny Flint and Strax (known to fans as "the Paternoster Gang") were due to return in the series premiere "Deep Breath". On 24 February 2014, it was announced that Gavin & Stacey actor Samuel Anderson would join the cast as the recurring character Danny Pink, a teacher and Clara's colleague at Coal Hill School.

Beyond the return of the Paternoster Gang, and the casting of Samuel Anderson, the first major guest star of the series was announced in March 2014 when it was revealed that Keeley Hawes had been cast in episode five as a character named Ms. Delphox. Subsequently, Tom Riley, Ben Miller, Hermione Norris, Frank Skinner, Foxes, Christopher Fairbank, Sanjeev Bhaskar, and Chris Addison were cast in guest roles. Other notable guest stars included Tony Jay, Peter Ferdinando, Zawe Ashton, Michael Smiley, Jonathan Bailey, Pippa Bennett-Warner, John Sessions, David Bamber, Christopher Villiers, and Joivan Wade.

Jemma Redgrave and Ingrid Oliver reprised their roles of Kate Stewart and Osgood, respectively, last seen in the fiftieth anniversary special "The Day of the Doctor", in the two-part series final "Dark Water" / "Death in Heaven". Michelle Gomez was later cast as a character named Missy, described as "The Gatekeeper of the Nethersphere" and was originally announced to be featured in the series finale; however Gomez also appeared in the series' first, second, sixth, ninth and tenth episodes as part of a recurring story arc. In "Dark Water", it was revealed that Missy is in fact The Master.

== Production ==
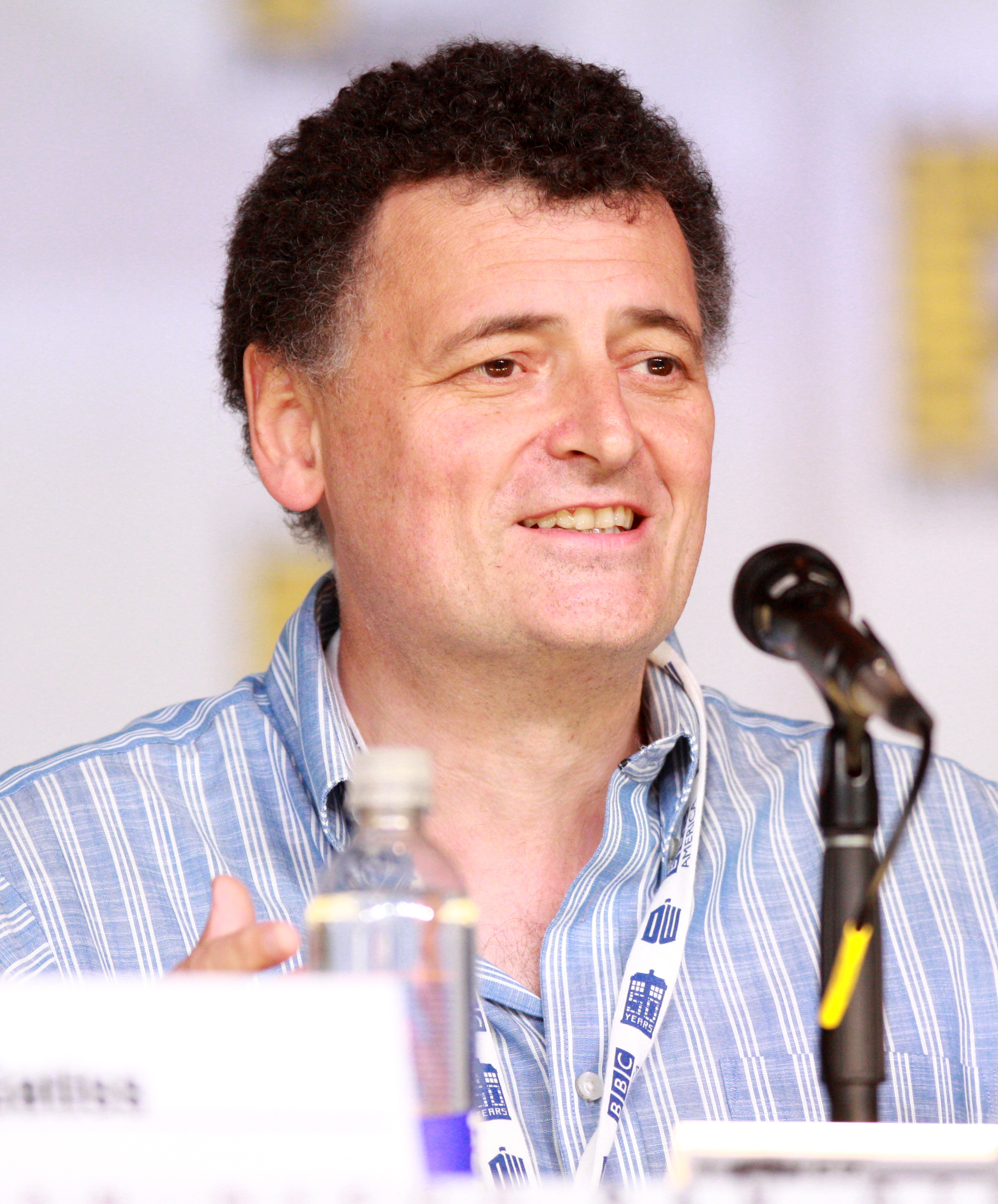
Steven Moffat at the 2013 San Diego Comic-Con, where he promoted his fourth series as showrunner.

=== Development ===
The series was officially ordered on 20 May 2013, and led by head writer and executive producer Steven Moffat, who returned as showrunner from the previous series, alongside executive producer Brian Minchin. At Comic-Con 2013, Moffat said that, although much of the focus at that point remained on the 50th anniversary and Christmas specials, development for series 8 was under way, stating that the scripts were arriving for the series, knowing the plot and conclusion of the series' episodes.

In an interview with Doctor Who Magazine, Moffat likened his initial plans for the Twelfth Doctor to Tom Baker's first season, with the Doctor being tricky to deal with at the beginning, but with the benefit of familiar characters to ease through the transition; Moffat also commented on the situation of Clara having to deal with the Doctor changing. Moffat also stated that, unlike the situation with Colin Baker, reference would be made to Peter Capaldi's previous appearances in the Whoniverse, specifically "The Fires of Pompeii" (2008) and Torchwood (2009). Moffat stated that he remembered Russell T Davies creating a plan to explain Capaldi's repeat appearances in Doctor Who-related media, and how he contacted Davies to confirm that the plan still worked with Capaldi portraying the Twelfth Doctor.

=== Writing ===
Chris Chibnall, who had written five previous episodes of Doctor Who, and a few for Torchwood, indicated in April 2013 that he had been approached by Moffat to contribute to Series 8. The subsequent success of his drama series, Broadchurch, led Chibnall to state that his schedule would not allow him to contribute to this particular series, although he was willing to write for Doctor Who in the future.

Neil Cross, who wrote two episodes in Series 7, also stated a desire to write for Series 8. Cross confirmed that he would be writing at least one episode for Series 8 in August 2013, while Neil Gaiman, who contributed one episode to Series 6 and another episode to Series 7, and Frank Cottrell-Boyce also stated that they were developing scripts. However, neither were able to confirm initially whether these would be for Series 8 or a subsequent series. On 4 July 2014, it was confirmed Boyce would also write an episode. In a 2022 newsletter, Grant Morrison revealed they had pitched ideas for episodes, including for a new monster, but none were commissioned.

Gareth Roberts, who had written five previous episodes of Doctor Who, returned for Series 8.

On 7 January 2014, it was announced that former producers Peter Bennett (producer in 2010, who had also worked on spin-off Torchwood and former showrunner Russell T Davies' Wizards vs Aliens) and Nikki Wilson (script editor and producer from 2009 to 2010) would produce the series. Will Oswald edited Episodes 1, 2, 5 and 6.

On 26 March 2014, it was announced that Mark Gatiss would write either one or two episodes for the series. In a Q&A in Brazil he said that he believed that Jane Austen should feature in an episode, just like other famous authors who have appeared on the show, such as William Shakespeare, Charles Dickens, and Agatha Christie.

In April 2014, it was announced Peter Harness and Jamie Mathieson would be writing for the series.

=== Design changes ===
The redesigned Doctor Who title card for series 8.

The introduction of a new lead actor brought about another change to the title sequence. The sequence for Series 8 was inspired by a fan-made sequence produced by Billy Hanshaw, an illustrator and 3D animator from Leeds, who posted it on YouTube. This eventually came to the attention of Steven Moffat, who subsequently based the official sequence on Hanshaw's work.

As director of the first block, Ben Wheatley was able to make lasting modifications to the TARDIS set. Wheatley had the cinematographer change the central column from green to golden, and had the art department create a replica of Tommy Westphall's snowglobe from St. Elsewhere, which Wheatley placed in the TARDIS set as a reference to the theory that all television exists in a shared dream reality.

=== Music ===
Murray Gold composed the soundtrack to this series, with orchestration by Ben Foster.

=== Filming ===
In August 2013, actress Jenna Coleman initially announced that filming was scheduled to begin in January 2014, after the broadcast of Peter Capaldi's initial appearance in the Christmas special that would contain the Doctor's regeneration. In late 2013, announcements were made for various directing appointments for the new series, with a total of six episodes allocated initially; in October, the first two episodes of the series were allocated to Ben Wheatley, with production due to start in December 2013. In November and December two further episodes were each allocated to Paul Murphy and Douglas Mackinnon. The first read through took place on 17 December 2013.

Filming began on 6 January 2014 in Cardiff, with Peter Capaldi and Jenna Coleman shooting their first scenes for Series 8 on 7 January 2014. On 22 February 2014 it was announced that Paul Wilmshurst would also direct an episode. On 11 May 2014, it was announced that an episode directed by Wilmshurst and written by Harness would be filming in Lanzarote, the second time Doctor Who has filmed there after the 1984 serial Planet of Fire. Filming took place in Volcán del Cuervo, also known as the Raven's Volcano. On 14 May 2014 it was announced that American director Rachel Talalay would be directing two episodes of the eighth series. On 2 July 2014 filming for the finale took place at the Box Cemetery in Llanelli, previously the location for the final scenes of the seventh series mid-season finale "The Angels Take Manhattan". On 4 July 2014 it was announced that Sheree Folkson would direct an episode. On 19 July 2014 filming with the Cybermen took place outside St Paul's Cathedral in London, which had previously been the setting of 1968's The Invasion. Filming on the series was completed on 6 August 2014.

Production blocks were arranged as follows:

Block	Episode(s)	Director	Writer(s)	Producer
1	Episode 1: "Deep Breath"	Ben Wheatley	Steven Moffat	Nikki Wilson
1	Episode 2: "Into the Dalek"	Ben Wheatley	Phil Ford & Steven Moffat	Nikki Wilson
2	Episode 4: "Listen"	Douglas Mackinnon	Steven Moffat	Peter Bennett
2	Episode 5: "Time Heist"	Douglas Mackinnon	Stephen Thompson & Steven Moffat	Peter Bennett
3	Episode 3: "Robot of Sherwood"	Paul Murphy	Mark Gatiss	Nikki Wilson
3	Episode 6: "The Caretaker"	Paul Murphy	Gareth Roberts & Steven Moffat	Nikki Wilson
4	Episode 7: "Kill the Moon"	Paul Wilmshurst	Peter Harness	Peter Bennett
4	Episode 8: "Mummy on the Orient Express"	Paul Wilmshurst	Jamie Mathieson	Peter Bennett
5	Episode 9: "Flatline"	Douglas Mackinnon	Jamie Mathieson	Nikki Wilson
6	Episode 11: "Dark Water"	Rachel Talalay	Steven Moffat	Peter Bennett
6	Episode 12: "Death in Heaven"	Rachel Talalay	Steven Moffat	Peter Bennett
7	Episode 10: "In the Forest of the Night"	Sheree Folkson	Frank Cottrell-Boyce	Paul Frift

== Release ==
=== Promotion ===
On 10 June 2014, the BBC announced a "World Tour" promoting Series 8 to take place from 7–19 August 2014 and featuring Peter Capaldi, Jenna Coleman and Steven Moffat. They visited seven cities across five continents in 12 days, where they attended fan events and media interviews. The destinations were Cardiff, London, Seoul, Sydney, New York City, Mexico City and Rio de Janeiro. On 13 July 2014 the first full-length trailer was aired on BBC One, during the final half-time of the 2014 FIFA World Cup.

Leading up to the launch of the series, four teaser trailers were released on 23 May, 27 June, 4 July and 27 July 2014. On 7 August 2014 an interview with Peter Capaldi was shown on BBC News, featuring clips from the second episode. Starting on 18 August, the BBC released a series of six short teasers counting down to the series' premiere.

=== Episode leaks ===
On 6 July 2014, the scripts and rough "pre air screeners" for the first five episodes of the series were inadvertently leaked online from BBC Worldwide's Latin America headquarters. The leaked scripts were immediately shared online, prompting wide coverage in the media. In a statement, BBC Worldwide asked people with access to the leaked material to keep the storylines of the five episodes secret.

On 12 July, the black and white, watermarked "pre air screener" of "Deep Breath" was uploaded to The Pirate Bay. The video was a rough cut of series 8's first episode, missing many visual effects, but otherwise mostly complete. The video leak was also widely covered in the media, but the BBC confirmed the leak was from the same source as the script, and had been contained. Despite the fact that the initial version of "Into the Dalek" contained a glitch that prevented downloading, a workable version found its way online by the second week of August 2014.

"Robot of Sherwood" was subsequently leaked in the third week of August, with fears that the rough cuts of the next three episodes, which were also included in the exposed file, would also be made available through file sharing sites. "Listen" and "Time Heist" were also leaked later on.

=== Broadcast ===
Series 8 was initially slated to be broadcast starting in the late summer of 2014, with Steven Moffat acknowledging this likelihood in July 2013, prior to the announcement of Peter Capaldi's casting. In September however it was suggested that the broadcast date would likely be pushed back to the third quarter of 2014, which would tie in with the production starting in January 2014 and typically lasting up to 9 months before the transmission of the first episode. It was also suggested that the series would be a twelve rather than thirteen episode run. In an October 2013 interview, Steven Moffat said that there would be at least 13 episodes in the series.

In February 2014, Ben Wheatley, director of the first two episodes, stated that his episodes would begin airing in the summer of 2014.

At the final 50th anniversary event at the BFI in December 2013, Steven Moffat confirmed that the series would contain 13 episodes and would be broadcast in the second half of 2014. He also stated that it would not be split into two parts, instead being transmitted continuously. Moffat also announced that this would be the standard broadcast format for future series. A teaser trailer released on 23 May 2014 revealed that the eighth series would air in August 2014. An extended teaser released on 27 June 2014 showed the airdate to be 23 August 2014.

The first episode, "Deep Breath", had its world premiere on 7 August 2014, at the Cardiff visit on the World Tour. Following additional preview screenings at other World Tour visits, the story also received a worldwide cinema release at participating cinemas on 23 August 2014, the same day as its television broadcast.

"Dark Water" and "Death in Heaven" received a 3D cinematic release on 15 and 16 September 2015.

BBC America in the United States aired the series the same day as the United Kingdom, and in Canada, it was aired on Space, the science fiction/fantasy channel. ABC TV in Australia aired the series live with the UK.

=== Aftershow ===
Doctor Who Extra is a documentary series created by the BBC as a complement to the Doctor Who series. Originally released following episodes during the eighth series of the show, the series documented behind the scenes information for the series and included many interviews with cast members. The series would continue into the show's ninth series.

=== Home media ===
The opening episode of the series "Deep Breath" was released as a standalone DVD and Blu-ray on 15 September 2014 in Region 2, 9 September 2014 in Region 1, and 10 September 2014 in Region 4. A 5-disc DVD and Blu-ray boxset containing all 12 episodes was released 24 November 2014 in Region 2, 19 November in Region 4 and 9 December 2014 in Region 1. The 3D edition of "Dark Water" and "Death in Heaven" will receive a 3D Blu-ray release on 22 September 2015 in Region 1.

- ^{(D)} indicates a DVD release for a specific date
- ^{(B)} indicates a Blu-ray release
- ^{(D,B)} indicates a simultaneous DVD and Blu-ray release
- ^{(3D)} indicates a 3D Blu-ray release (includes DVD and Blu-ray)

Series	Story no.	Episode name	Duration	Release date		
Series	Story no.	Episode name	Duration	R2	R4	R1
8	242	Doctor Who: "Deep Breath"	1 × 76 min.	15 September 2014^{(D,B)}	10 September 2014^{(D,B)}	9 September 2014^{(D,B)}
8	242–252	Doctor Who: The Complete Eighth Series	1 × 76 min. 1 × 60 min. 10 × 45 min.	24 November 2014^{(D,B)}	19 November 2014^{(D,B)}	9 December 2014^{(D,B)}
8	252	Doctor Who: "Dark Water" / "Death in Heaven"	1 × 45 min. 1 × 60 min.	—N/a	—N/a	22 September 2015 (3D)
8	242–247	Doctor Who: Series 8, Part 1 "Deep Breath" – "The Caretaker"	1 × 76 min. 5 × 45 min.	—N/a	—N/a	20 September 2016^{(D)}
8	248–252	Doctor Who: Series 8, Part 2 "Kill the Moon" – "Death in Heaven"	1 × 60 min. 5 × 45 min.	—N/a	—N/a	13 December 2016^{(D)}
8, 9, 10	242–276	Doctor Who: The Complete Peter Capaldi Years	26 × 45 min. 5 × 50 min. 1 × 55 min. 7 × 60 min. 1 × 76 min.	—N/a	—N/a	13 February 2018^{(B)} 2 October 2018^{(D)}

== In print ==
Series	Story no.	Novelisation title	Author	Original publisher	Paperback release date	Audiobook	
Series	Story no.	Novelisation title	Author	Original publisher	Paperback release date	Release date (Note: Unabridged from BBC Audio / AudioGo unless otherwise indicated)	Narrator
8	244	Robot of Sherwood	David Maule	Pearson Education	29 May 2018 (Note: mp3-CD issued by Pearson with paperback of the novelisation)		TBA
8	249	Mummy on the Orient Express	Jane Rollason	Pearson Education	29 May 2018		TBA
8	250	Flatline	Nancy Taylor	Pearson Education	29 May 2018		TBA

== Reception ==
=== Ratings ===
No.	Title	Air date	Overnight ratings		Consolidated ratings		Total viewers (millions)	AI	Ref(s)
No.	Title	Air date	Viewers (millions)	Rank	Viewers (millions)	Rank	Total viewers (millions)	AI	Ref(s)
1	"Deep Breath"	23 August 2014	6.80	1	2.37	2	9.17	82	
2	"Into the Dalek"	30 August 2014	5.20	2	2.09	2	7.29	84	
3	"Robot of Sherwood"	6 September 2014	5.20	2	2.08	4	7.28	82	
4	"Listen"	13 September 2014	4.80	2	2.21	2	7.01	82	
5	"Time Heist"	20 September 2014	4.93	2	2.06	5	6.99	84	
6	"The Caretaker"	27 September 2014	4.89	3	1.93	7	6.82	83	
7	"Kill the Moon"	4 October 2014	4.81	3	2.1	8	6.91	82	
8	"Mummy on the Orient Express"	11 October 2014	5.08	3	2.03	5	7.11	85	
9	"Flatline"	18 October 2014	4.60	4	2.11	9	6.71	85	
10	"In the Forest of the Night"	25 October 2014	5.03	3	1.89	7	6.92	83	
11	"Dark Water"	1 November 2014	5.27	4	2.07	7	7.34	85	
12	"Death in Heaven"	8 November 2014	5.45	3	2.15	6	7.60	83	

=== Critical reception ===
Critical reaction to series 8 was positive. On Rotten Tomatoes, the series holds an approval rating of 88%, based on 26 reviews, and an average score of 8.17/10, with the website's critics consensus stating that "Like a TARDIS dropping down in a burst of excitement, Peter Capaldi adds a revitalizing blast of boldness and humor to Doctor Who's time-tested formula." Metacritic gave the series a weighted average score of 80/100, signifying "generally favourable reviews". Ian Jane of DVD Talk gave the series 4.5 out of 5, calling it an improvement over the Matt Smith years, praising Capaldi's performance for "[breathing] new life to the show", Clara's character development and the writing, and found the series' flaws not to overshadow its overall quality. Many critics gave favourable praise towards the show's renewed focus on character development and the darker tone of the stories, yet the Radio Times reported that the latter element drew a degree of controversy after it received criticism from parents of young children.

Critical reception to individual episodes was predominantly positive, with "Listen" and "Dark Water" receiving critical acclaim after many critics noted them as potential classics and some of Doctor Who's finest episodes. "Deep Breath", "Into the Dalek", "Time Heist", "The Caretaker", "Flatline" and "Death in Heaven" also received predominantly positive reviews from critics. "Kill the Moon" widely divided critics after its broadcast - some praised it as a classic matching that of "Listen", while others found it a weak or badly-scripted episode. Dan Martin, writing for The Guardian, criticised "Mummy on the Orient Express"; despite other critics giving the episode positive reviews—his focus was on the display of "sexual tension" between the Doctor and Clara that went against views of the show's cast, who previously stated that there would be no flirting between the two.

=== Awards and nominations ===
Year	Award	Category	Nominee(s)	Result	Ref(s)
2014	IGN Best Television awards	Best Sci-Fi/Horror Series – People's Choice	Doctor Who	Won	
2014	IGN Best Television awards	Best Sci-Fi/Horror Series	Doctor Who	Nominated	
2015	BAFTA Cymru	Best Actor	Peter Capaldi	Nominated	
2015	BAFTA Cymru	Best Actress	Jenna Coleman	Nominated	
2015	BAFTA Cymru	Editing for "Kill The Moon"	William Oswald	Nominated	
2015	BAFTA Cymru	Best Titles and Graphic Identity for "Deep Breath"	Production Team	Nominated	
2015	BAFTA Cymru	Best Special and Visual Effects for "Last Christmas"	Production Team	Nominated	
2015	BAFTA Scotland	Best Actress	Michelle Gomez	Nominated	
2015	BAFTA Scotland	Best Writer	Steven Moffat	Nominated	
2015	BAFTA TV Craft Award	Best Visual Effects	Milk VFX, Real SFX, BBC Wales VFX	Won	
2015	GLAAD Media Award	GLAAD Media Award for Outstanding Individual Episode	Deep Breath	Nominated	
2015	Bram Stoker Award	Best Screenplay	Steven Moffat	Nominated	
2015	Hugo Awards	Hugo Award for Best Dramatic Presentation (Short Form)	Steven Moffat, Douglas Mackinnon	Nominated	
2015	Online Film & Television Association Awards	Best Actor in a Drama Series	Peter Capaldi	Nominated	
2015	Online Film & Television Association Awards	Best Drama Series	Doctor Who	Nominated	
2015	TV Choice Awards	Best Actor	Peter Capaldi	Nominated	
2015	TV Choice Awards	Best Actress	Jenna Coleman	Nominated	
2015	TV Choice Awards	Best Family Drama	Doctor Who	Nominated	
2015	National Television Awards	Most Popular Drama	Doctor Who	Nominated	
2015	Saturn Award	Best Youth-Oriented Television Series	Doctor Who	Nominated	
2015	Saturn Award	Best Supporting Actress on Television	Jenna Coleman	Nominated	

== Soundtrack ==
Selected pieces of score from this series, as composed by Murray Gold, were released in a 3-CD set on 18 May 2015 by Silva Screen Records along with music from the 2014 Christmas special "Last Christmas".

Doctor Who: Series 8

Soundtrack album by Murray Gold and the BBC National Orchestra of Wales conducted by Ben Foster and James Shearman.
- Released: 18 May 2015
- Recorded: 2014
- Genre: Soundtrack
- Length: 182:39
- Label: Silva Screen
- Producer: Murray Gold

Doctor Who soundtrack chronology
The Day of the Doctor/The Time of the Doctor (2014)	Series 8 (2015)	The Daleks (2017)

Disc 1
No.	Title	Episode	Length
1.	"Doctor Who Theme (Series 8)"	All	1:16
2.	"A Good Man? (Twelve's Theme)"	Various	7:33
3.	"Something It Ate"	"Deep Breath"	2:39
4.	"Concussed"	"Deep Breath"	3:27
5.	"It's Still Him"	"Deep Breath"	1:58
6.	"Pudding Brains"	"Deep Breath"	5:26
7.	"Breath"	"Deep Breath"	4:44
8.	"Hello Hello"	"Deep Breath"	3:15
9.	"A Drink First"	"Deep Breath"	2:01
10.	"Missy's Theme"	"Deep Breath"	1:33
11.	"Aristotle, We Have Been Hit"	"Into the Dalek"	0:59
12.	"We're Still Going To Kill You"	"Into the Dalek"	3:55
13.	"Tell Me, Am I A Good Man?"	"Into the Dalek"	4:02
14.	"What Difference A Good Dalek?"	"Into the Dalek"	3:31
15.	"The Truth About The Daleks"	"Into the Dalek"	2:07
16.	"Old Fashioned Hero"	"Robot of Sherwood"	2:15
17.	"This Is My Spoon"	"Robot of Sherwood"	2:06
18.	"Robert, Earl of Loxley"	"Robot of Sherwood"	1:59
19.	"The Legend of Robin Hood"	"Robot of Sherwood"	2:17
20.	"Robin of Sherwood"	"Robot of Sherwood"	3:14
21.	"The Golden Arrow"	"Robot of Sherwood"	1:36
22.	"Listen"	"Listen"	2:24
23.	"Rupert Pink"	"Listen"	3:56
24.	"Fear"	"Listen"	2:46
Total length:			70:59

Disc 2
No.	Title	Episode	Length
1.	"The Architect"	"Time Heist"	1:27
2.	"Rob The Bank"	"Time Heist"	0:57
3.	"Account Closed"	"Time Heist"	2:08
4.	"Open Up"	"Time Heist"	2:06
5.	"The Caretaker"	"The Caretaker"	5:15
6.	"Are You Going To Shoot Me?"	"Kill the Moon"	1:56
7.	"When I Say Run"	"Kill the Moon"	1:45
8.	"That Is The Moon"	"Kill the Moon"	2:01
9.	"Start The Clock"	"Mummy on the Orient Express"	1:32
10.	""Don't Stop Me Now" (Instrumental)" (download only)	"Mummy on the Orient Express"	3:20
11.	"There's That Smile"	"Mummy on the Orient Express"	2:23
12.	"The Sarcophagus Opens"	"Mummy on the Orient Express"	3:58
13.	"The Artefact"	"Mummy on the Orient Express"	2:04
14.	"Study Our Own Demise"	"Mummy on the Orient Express"	2:12
15.	"Not Knowing"	"Flatline"	3:00
16.	"Siege Mode"	"Flatline"	1:26
17.	"In The Woods"	"In the Forest of the Night"	2:21
18.	"We Weren't Asleep That Long"	"In the Forest of the Night"	1:02
19.	"Forgetting"	"In the Forest of the Night"	1:45
20.	"The Song of Danny and Clara"	"In the Forest of the Night"	2:40
21.	"Throw Away The Key"	"Dark Water"	4:14
22.	"Browsing"	"Dark Water"	2:22
23.	"They Walk Among Us"	"Dark Water"	2:20
24.	"There is No Clara Oswald"	"Death in Heaven"	0:59
25.	"Missy And Her Boys"	"Death in Heaven"	1:17
26.	"A Good Man, An Incredible Liar"	"Death in Heaven"	1:35
27.	"Freefall"	"Death in Heaven"	1:40
28.	"I Need To Know"	"Death in Heaven"	4:59
29.	"Missy's Theme - Extended"	"Death in Heaven"	2:05
30.	"Missy's Gift"	"Death in Heaven"	2:03
31.	"(The Majestic Tale of) An Idiot With a Box"	"Death in Heaven"	2:21
Total length:			71:13

Disc 3
No.	Title	Episode	Length
1.	"3 Perfectly Ordinary Roof People"	"Last Christmas"	4:20
2.	"Do You Really Believe In Santa?"	"Last Christmas"	1:00
3.	"Unsealing the Infirmary"	"Last Christmas"	2:46
4.	"Ghosts"	"Last Christmas"	1:52
5.	"What Seems to be the Problem?"	"Last Christmas"	1:07
6.	"We Don't Know What's Real"	"Last Christmas"	2:33
7.	"Thinking About It"	"Last Christmas"	1:15
8.	"Clara's Dream Christmas"	"Last Christmas"	3:56
9.	"The Doctor's Dream Christmas"	"Last Christmas"	5:32
10.	"Dreams Within Dreams"	"Last Christmas"	4:50
11.	"Believe in Santa"	"Last Christmas"	1:30
12.	"Sleigh Ride"	"Last Christmas"	2:47
13.	"A Reunion"	"Last Christmas"	3:11
14.	"Every Christmas is Last Christmas"	"Last Christmas"	3:48
Total length:			40:27
