= In the Forest of the Night =

251 – "In the Forest of the Night"
- Doctor Who episode

Cast
- Doctor: Peter Capaldi – Twelfth Doctor
- Companion: Jenna Coleman – Clara Oswald
- Others: Samuel Anderson – Danny Pink; Abigail Eames – Maebh Arden; Jayden Harris-Wallace – Samson; Ashley Foster – Bradley; Harley Bird – Ruby; Michelle Gomez – Missy; Siwan Morris – Maebh's mum; Harry Dickman – George; Jenny Hill – Herself; Eloise Barnes – Annabel; James Weber Brown – Minister; Michelle Asante – Neighbour; Curtis Flowers – Emergency services officer; Kate Tydman – Paris reporter; Nana Amoo-Gottfried – Accra reporter; William Wright-Neblett – Little boy

Production
- Directed by: Sheree Folkson
- Written by: Frank Cottrell-Boyce
- Produced by: Paul Frift
- Executive producers: Steven Moffat; Brian Minchin
- Music by: Murray Gold
- Series: Series 8
- Running time: 45 minutes
- First broadcast: 25 October 2014

Chronology
← Preceded by "Flatline"	Followed by → "Dark Water"

"In the Forest of the Night" is the tenth episode of the eighth series of the British science fiction television programme Doctor Who. It was first broadcast on BBC One on 25 October 2014. The episode was written by Frank Cottrell-Boyce and directed by Sheree Folkson.

In the episode, the alien time traveller the Doctor (Peter Capaldi) and his companion, schoolteacher Clara (Jenna Coleman), go looking for Maebh (Abigail Eames), a missing student of Clara's who is able to hear the voices of a large forest that covered all of Earth the previous night.

The episode was watched by 6.92 million viewers and received mixed reviews from critics.

== Plot ==
Clara, Danny, and several Coal Hill students on an overnight school trip wake up to find Earth has been covered by large forests. One of the students, Maebh, hears a thought from Clara to find the Twelfth Doctor. She finds him in Trafalgar Square. Clara, Danny, and the other students regroup in Trafalgar Square to recover Maebh. In the TARDIS, Danny finds a pile of student notebooks that Clara had left behind. He realises Clara lied about foregoing future travels with the Doctor. Among the notebooks is Maebh's, each page having a picture of an angry sun striking down trees. Maebh goes missing; Clara explains that since the disappearance of her sister Annabel, Maebh hears voices in her head, and takes medication to calm these effects.

The Doctor explains to Clara that he believes a giant solar flare will strike Earth today. They find Maebh. As Maebh's medication wears off, the Doctor examines her movements and thinks she is communicating with something. He temporarily creates a gravity field around Maebh, revealing many insect-like creatures. They speak through Maebh, claiming responsibility for growing the forest, as they had done before in the north and in the south.

The Doctor believes Earth is doomed from the solar flare, and offers to take Clara, Danny, and the students away in the TARDIS. The students prefer to stay and find their parents, Danny insists on staying with the students, and Clara refuses to become the last of her kind. Later admitting he was wrong, the Doctor tells Clara, Danny, and the students the creatures were referring to the Tunguska Event and the Curuçá impact, events that should have been catastrophic for life on Earth. The Doctor believes that the trees shielded Earth from the solar flare as they had for those impacts. The Doctor hacks into the global cellular network and Maebh reads off a message prepared by the other students to tell everyone on Earth to leave the trees alone, and to request Annabel to come home. Danny tells Clara he wants to know the truth about her travels with the Doctor, and asks her to think about it first.

The Doctor and Clara watch the solar flare harmlessly strike Earth from space. As the trees dissipate, the Doctor explains that humanity will forget about the sudden appearance of the trees, as they have before, but the memory will linger as fairy tales. Outside her house, Maebh reunites with Annabel.

=== Continuity ===
The Doctor responds to Clara's suggestion that he save himself and abandon the Earth with her words to him in "Kill the Moon": "This is my world, too. I walk your Earth. I breathe your air".

=== Outside references ===
The title is from the second line of William Blake's The Tyger: Tyger Tyger, burning bright, In the forests of the night. (The forests appear overnight and a tiger appears in the episode). This episode contains many elements of fairy tales, as explained in Doctor Who Extra. For example, Maebh in a red coat getting chased by wolves ("Little Red Riding Hood"). Maebh's last name is Arden, a reference to the forest in William Shakespeare's play As You Like It.

== Broadcast and reception ==
Overnight viewing figures were estimated at 5.03 million viewers. The episode was watched by a total of 6.92 million viewers. On BBC America this episode was seen by 1.06 million viewers, being the most watched episode since the airing of "Listen". It also received an Appreciation Index of 83.

=== Critical reception ===
Professional ratings
Review scores
Source	Rating
The A.V. Club	B
SFX Magazine	4/5 stars
TV Fanatic	4.4/5 stars
CultBox	4/5 stars
IGN	7.4
New York Magazine	2/5 stars
Radio Times	3/5 stars
Digital Spy	2/5 stars
The Daily Telegraph	4/5 stars

The episode received mixed reviews from critics, with some praising its poetic, unique feel and contrasts with the darker episodes of the series, while some were critical of the lack of threat. Ben Lawrence of The Daily Telegraph gave it four stars out of five and called it "powerful". He was positive toward the Doctor's character development and Peter Capaldi's performance. Chris Pyke of Wales Online said the episode was not a "scary or fun adventure", but "languished somewhere in between" and seemed like a filler before the series' conclusion. Matt Dennis of The News Hub criticised the story for the lack of "any real threat or tension for the most part", and described it as "45 minutes of wandering aimlessly about". Patrick Mulkern gave the episode three stars in Radio Times. He called it a "delightful fable for kids and indulgent grown-ups", but found the premise was "almost as credulity-stretching" as the Moon being an egg in the same series. Neela Debnath of The Independent said that it was not "the strongest instalment", but the "witty dialogue and young guest cast make up for it". She felt that it was "a novel concept that starts off well but unravels fairly quickly", whereas Jamie McLoughlin of Liverpool Echo gave an overwhelmingly positive review, giving it five stars, calling it a "masterclass".

However, Morgan Jeffery of Digital Spy gave a negative review, granting it two stars out of five. He called the script "unsophisticated" and "an utterly disappointing experience". However, he gave a positive review of Capaldi, Jenna Coleman and Samuel Anderson's performances. Matt Risley of IGN gave a rating of 7.4 out of 10. He felt it worked far better than the previous light-hearted episode of the series, "Robot of Sherwood", and that it was a refreshing change from the dark undertones of the series, but felt that Anderson was underused and criticised the disparate narratives.

Showrunner Steven Moffat defended the episode, saying it was "beautifully and elegantly written," and added, "I think will grow in stature over the years."
