= Flatline (Doctor Who) =

250 – "Flatline"
- Doctor Who episode

Cast
- Doctor: Peter Capaldi – Twelfth Doctor
- Companion: Jenna Coleman – Clara Oswald
- Others: Samuel Anderson – Danny Pink; John Cummins – Roscoe; Jessica Hayles – PC Forrest; Joivan Wade – Rigsy; Christopher Fairbank – Fenton; Matt Bardock – Al; Raj Bajaj – George; James Quinn – Bill; Michelle Gomez – Missy

Production
- Directed by: Douglas Mackinnon
- Written by: Jamie Mathieson
- Produced by: Nikki Wilson
- Executive producers: Steven Moffat; Brian Minchin
- Music by: Murray Gold
- Series: Series 8
- Running time: 43 minutes
- First broadcast: 18 October 2014

Chronology
← Preceded by "Mummy on the Orient Express"	Followed by → "In the Forest of the Night"

"Flatline" is the ninth episode of the eighth series of the British science fiction television programme Doctor Who. It was first broadcast on BBC One on 18 October 2014. The episode was written by Jamie Mathieson and directed by Douglas Mackinnon.

In the episode, the alien time traveller the Doctor (Peter Capaldi) is trapped inside his time machine and spaceship the TARDIS after the TARDIS's external dimensions get shrunk by two-dimensional extraterrestrial creatures, which he ultimately dubs the Boneless, in present-day Bristol. Assisted by local graffiti artist Rigsy (Joivan Wade), the Doctor's companion Clara (Jenna Coleman) carries the miniature TARDIS with her and temporarily takes over the Doctor's role of trying to protect humanity from alien incursions.

The episode was watched by 6.71 million viewers and received positive reviews, with particular praise for Coleman's performance.

== Plot ==
The Twelfth Doctor discovers something draining energy from the TARDIS and materialises in Bristol. Clara befriends Rigsy, a graffiti artist assigned to community service on a council estate. He tells Clara that several people have gone missing. When Clara returns to the Doctor, the exterior dimensions of the TARDIS have shrunk too small for the Doctor to leave. The Doctor passes Clara his sonic screwdriver, psychic paper, and an earpiece to let him communicate with her, and she carries the TARDIS in her bag, acting as the Doctor.

Clara convinces PC Forrest to let her and Rigsy into the flat of the first disappearance. They hear Forrest scream from the next room. They see no sign of her, but find a strange mural on the wall. The Doctor recognises it as a human nervous system, and suspects it is Forrest's. He warns Clara and Rigsy that there are two-dimensional creatures, the Boneless, which are flattening the missing persons into two dimensions. Clara and Rigsy escape before they are attacked.

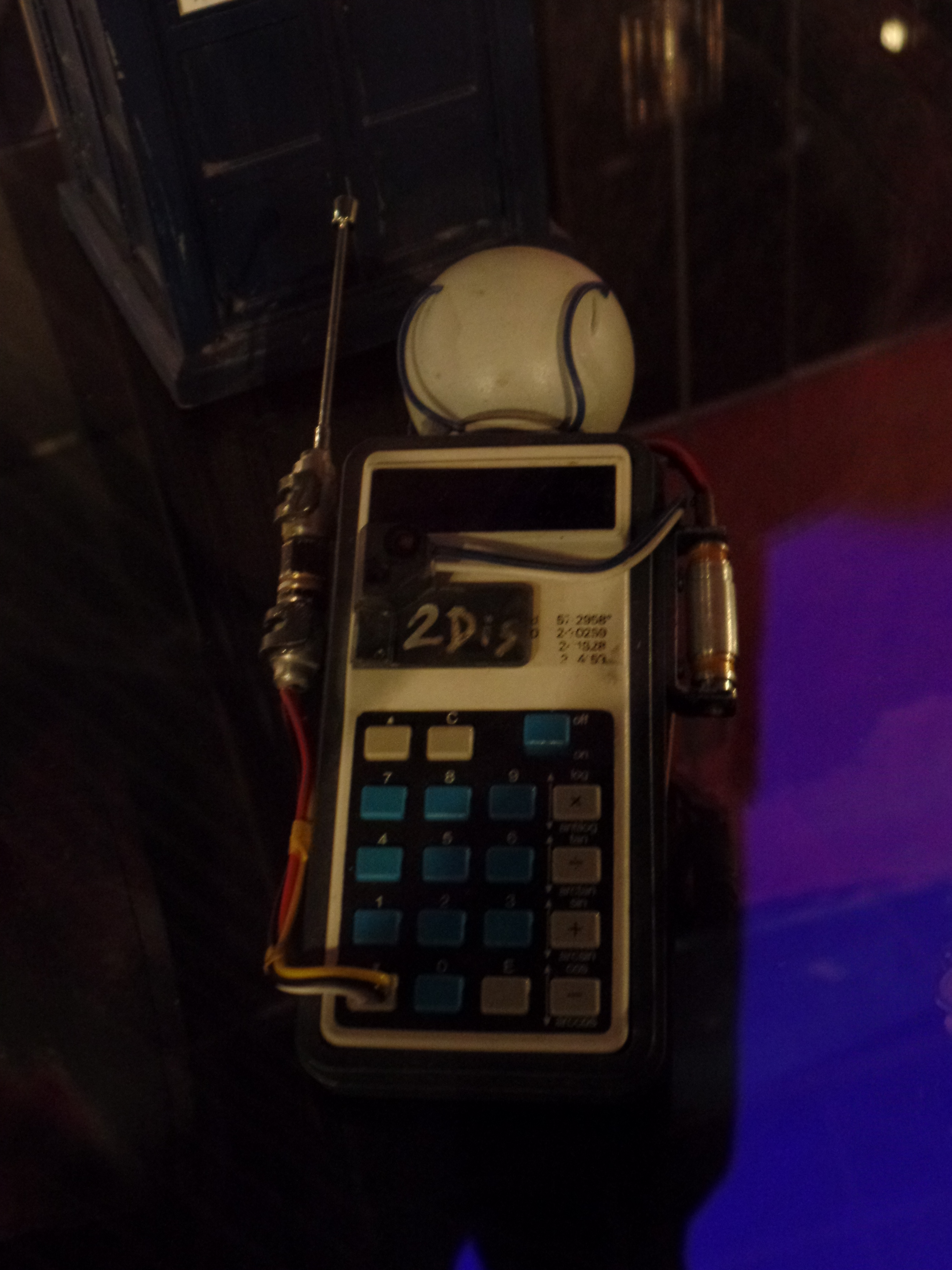
The 2dis, the device that restores dimensions, as shown at the Doctor Who Experience.

They race back to the other community service crewmen to warn them the murals in a pedestrian subway are additional Boneless. Some crewmen are killed while Clara leads the rest through a train yard into tunnels. They are followed by the Boneless, which take the form of the people they killed to use the third dimension. The Boneless surround the others by flattening the doors into two dimensions. The Doctor jerry-rigs a device to undo this flattening to give the group time to escape. In their haste, Clara drops the TARDIS in the path of an oncoming train. The Doctor turns on Siege Mode, preventing any physical damage but leaving him without enough power to deactivate Siege Mode.

Clara has Rigsy paint a realistic door on a large poster. The poster is hung over an access tunnel to lure the Boneless to it. The Boneless, thinking it is a flattened door, funnel their energy into it to restore it, but instead they power the TARDIS that Clara placed behind the poster. The TARDIS reverts to its normal size and form, and the Doctor erects a barrier to hold the Boneless in place. Realising the Boneless have no peaceful intentions, he returns them to their dimension. The Doctor asks Clara how she enjoyed being the Doctor for the day. Elsewhere, Missy watches Clara, muttering to herself that she has "chosen well".

=== Continuity ===
The TARDIS exterior shrank to an inch in size in the serial Planet of Giants (1964), with the First Doctor and his companions also being shrunk to that size, and it was reduced to the size of a dollhouse in the serial Logopolis (1981), with the Fourth Doctor trapped inside.

== Production ==
The read through for "Flatline" took place on 19 May 2014. Filming began soon afterwards, on 28 May, and concluded on 18 June 2014.

It was filmed in Barry Tourist Railway which stood in for Bristol, along with Wenvoe Tunnel, also in Barry.

== Broadcast and reception ==
Overnight viewing figures were estimated at 4.6 million. The episode was watched by a total of 6.71 million viewers. In the US, this episode was seen by 0.75 million viewers. It also received an AI of 85, considered excellent.

=== Critical reception ===
Professional ratings
Review scores
Source	Rating
The A.V. Club	B+
Paste Magazine	9.4
SFX Magazine	4/5 stars
TV Fanatic	4.7/5 stars
CultBox	4/5 stars
IndieWire	B+
IGN	8.3
New York Magazine	5/5 stars
Radio Times	5/5 stars
Digital Spy	3/5 stars
The Daily Telegraph	5/5 stars

The episode received positive reviews, with many praising Jamie Mathieson's script, Jenna Coleman's performance and the uniquely designed monsters. Neela Debnath of The Independent praised Coleman and Peter Capaldi's performances and believed this episode to be stronger than the previous week's "Mummy on the Orient Express", also scripted by Mathieson, although she was critical of the CGI effects. Matt Risley of IGN gave the episode 8.3 out of 10, praising the concept of the episode and the performance of Coleman, but criticising the guest cast. Morgan Jeffery of Digital Spy gave a mixed review of the episode, calling it "a bumpy ride." He too was critical of the supporting cast, citing lack of depth to their personalities. He was, however, positive of the CGI, calling it "the most impressive and distinctive this show has featured in recent memory." Overall he gave the episode 3 stars out of five.

Reviewing the episode for The Daily Telegraph, Michael Hogan noted that Christopher Fairbank was billed as the guest star but Joivan Wade outshone him. He stated that the episode had "outlandishly original ideas, smartly executed. It was thrillingly unsettling and ultimately satisfying." Dan Martin, for The Guardian, wrote that Jamie Mathieson's script "is one of the more effective demonstrations of how to do the 'cheap one'." Martin also stated that Clara is "becoming more and more like the Doctor". Alasdair Wilkins of The A.V. Club awarded the episode a B+, stating that "the show is on a hot streak we haven't seen in a long, long time". Wilkins closed his review by saying "'Flatline' isn't perfect, but it underlines just how great the 12th Doctor and Clara have been for each other, and how great their pairing has been for the show, if for no other reason than their complex relationship has forced the show to be thoughtful in a way it hasn't in quite some time".

== In print ==
Flatline
- Author: Nancy Taylor
- Series: Doctor Who novelisations
- Publisher: Pearson Education
- Publication date: 15 June 2018
- ISBN: 978-1292206158

Pearson Education published a novelisation of this episode by Nancy Taylor for students of English language reading 24 May 2018.
