= Time Heist =

246 – "Time Heist"
- Doctor Who episode

Cast
- Doctor: Peter Capaldi – Twelfth Doctor
- Companion: Jenna Coleman – Clara Oswald
- Others: Keeley Hawes – Ms Delphox/Madame Karabraxos; Jonathan Bailey – Psi; Pippa Bennett-Warner – Saibra; Trevor Sellers – Mr Porrima; Ross Mullan – The Teller; Mark Ebulue – Guard; Junior Laniyan – Suited customer

Production
- Directed by: Douglas Mackinnon
- Written by: Stephen Thompson and Steven Moffat
- Produced by: Peter Bennett
- Executive producers: Steven Moffat; Brian Minchin
- Music by: Murray Gold
- Series: Series 8
- Running time: 45 minutes
- First broadcast: 20 September 2014

Chronology
← Preceded by "Listen"	Followed by → "The Caretaker"

"Time Heist" is the fifth episode of the eighth series of the British science fiction television programme Doctor Who. It was first broadcast on BBC One on 20 September 2014. The episode was written by Stephen Thompson and Steven Moffat, and directed by Douglas Mackinnon.

In the episode, the alien time traveller called the Doctor (Peter Capaldi), along with human companion Clara Oswald (Jenna Coleman), mutant human Saibra (Pippa Bennett-Warner), and augmented human Psi (Jonathan Bailey), get recruited to break into and rob the secure Bank of Karabraxos, which is protected by a telepathic alien called the Teller (Ross Mullan). The episode was watched by 6.99 million viewers in the UK, receiving generally positive reviews from television critics.

== Plot ==
In Clara's flat, the Twelfth Doctor answers the TARDIS's phone; both are surprised to find themselves in a room with two others: Psi, a hacker with an augmented brain, and Saibra, a mutant shapeshifter. A recording includes messages from each agreeing to a short-term memory wipe, before getting instructions from the Architect to break into the Bank of Karabraxos and steal three items from its vault.

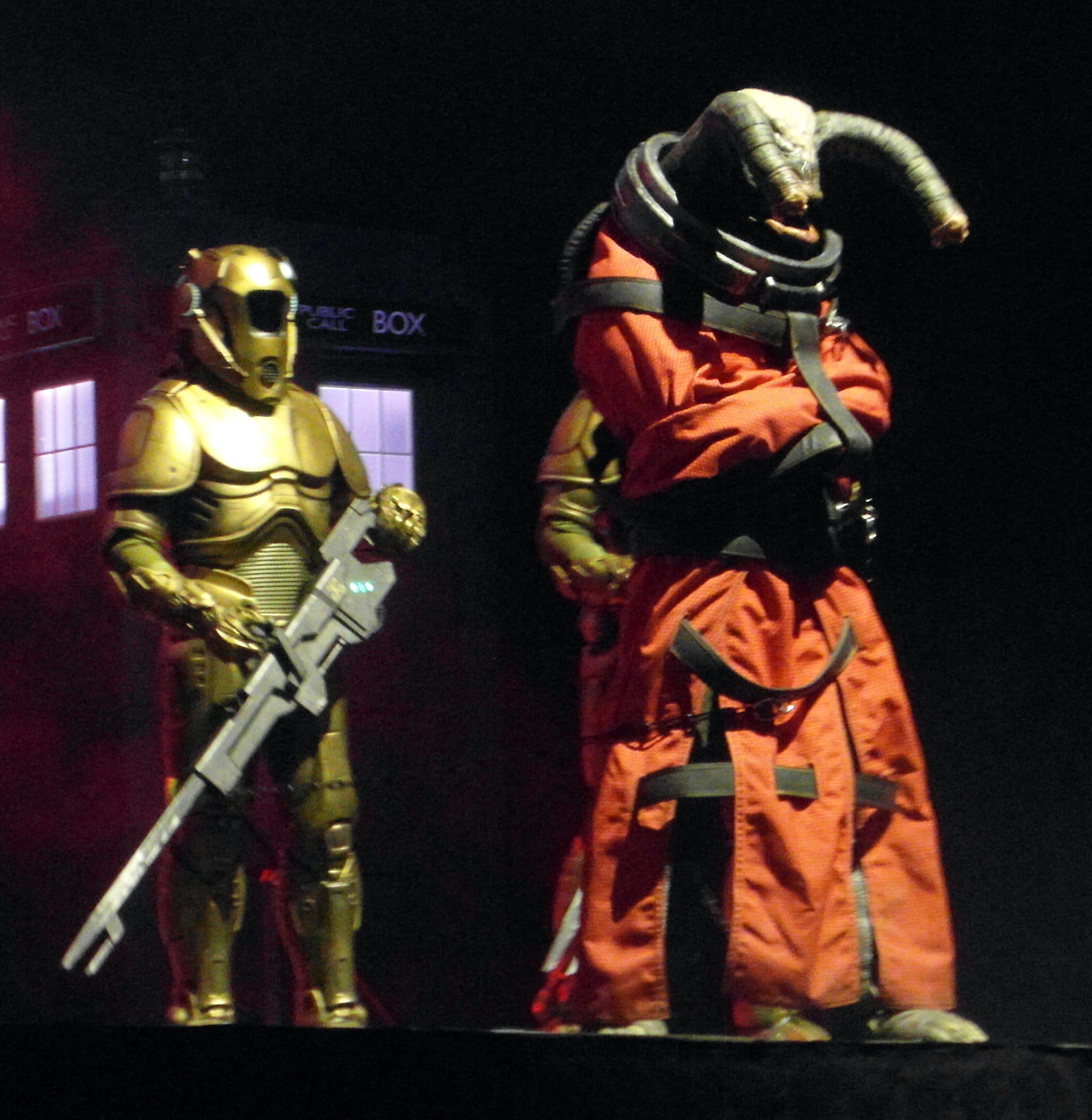
The Teller and its guards, shown here at the Doctor Who Symphonic Spectacular

The head of bank security Ms. Delphox uses a telepathic alien called the Teller to detect those with criminal intent and destroy their brains; the Doctor believes the memory wipes were needed to avoid being caught. Within, the Doctor, Clara, Saibra, and Psi find six devices left by the Architect that appear to be atomic shredders, to be used if they are caught to die quickly and painlessly. Both Saibra and Psi sacrifice themselves with shredders when they encounter the Teller, allowing the Doctor and Clara to reach the vault door.

The door appears impossible to open, but then a solar storm strikes the planet's surface, triggering an automatic unlocking sequence; the Doctor realises this was a "time travel heist". They recover two items: a serum to stabilise Saibra's DNA, and a circuit to restore Psi's long-term memories. The Doctor and Clara are captured and brought to Delphox's office. The guards reveal themselves as Saibra and Psi; the shredders are actually short-range teleports to an escape ship in orbit. The storm threatens to destroy the Bank, but the Doctor wants to uncover the third item.

They meet the Bank's director Madame Karabraxos in her private vault. Karabraxos directs Ms. Delphox—who is the latest one of her clones—to have the Teller brought to the vault, before having Delphox incinerated for letting Karabraxos down. Before Karabraxos departs, the Doctor gives her the TARDIS phone number to use when she has a moment of regret. When the Teller arrives, the Doctor lets it restore his short-term memory. The call to the TARDIS was from a dying Karabraxos, regretting something she left in the vault. The Doctor became the Architect of the time heist to assemble Saibra and Psi and plant the teleports to get them to this point. The Doctor shows them why they had six teleports: Karabraxos wanted him to rescue the Teller's mate that she had locked up to force the Teller's cooperation. The Teller frees its mate. The two, last of their kind, are evacuated to an unpopulated planet to live out their lives in peace.

=== Continuity ===
Memory worms were first introduced in the 2012 Christmas special, "The Snowmen".

When Psi tries to lure the Teller away from Clara by visualising some of the galaxy's most notorious criminals, the mugshots he is seen accessing include a Sensorite (from the 1964 serial The Sensorites), a Terileptil (from the 1982 serial The Visitation), a Slitheen, an Ice Warrior, the Gunslinger from "A Town Called Mercy", Captain John Hart from Torchwood, Androvax and the Trickster from The Sarah Jane Adventures, and Abslom Daak from Doctor Who Magazine.

== Production ==
Speaking about the premise for the episode, director Douglas Mackinnon said “What we wanted to do was a heist movie for Doctor Who. I've watched virtually every heist movie there's ever been, and it incorporates things into it, but because it's Doctor Who, time travel is involved."

The read-through for the episode took place on 11 February 2014. Filming began on 3 March 2014. Filming took place at George Street in Bridgend on 5 March 2014, and in Roald Dahl Plass, Cardiff Bay on 13 March. Filming continued at the Hadyn Ellis Building, part of Cardiff University, on 18 March 2014, and at the nearby Bute Park the next day. Media coverage of filming made note of a new monster that was spotted on set, with some calling it Doctor Who's "strangest monster yet." Scenes were also filmed at the Uskmouth Power Station, previously a location for "The Doctor, the Widow and the Wardrobe" and "Into the Dalek". Filming concluded on 24 March 2014.

A trailer for the episode was released on 15 September 2014.

== Broadcast and reception ==
=== Leak ===
"Time Heist" was one of five scripts leaked online after being sent for translation to a BBC Worldwide server in Miami. A rough cut of the episode was also leaked, on 21 August 2014, following the leaks of the first three episodes of the season ("Deep Breath", "Into the Dalek", and "Robot of Sherwood"). It was followed shortly by the leak of the fourth episode, "Listen".

=== Ratings ===
Overnight in the UK, "Time Heist" got a figure of 4.93 million with a 23.8% share. Its final ratings were 6.99 million. "Time Heist" came in second for the night behind The X Factor. In the United States, the original broadcast of the episode reached 1.03 million viewers. The episode achieved an Appreciation Index of 84.

=== Critical reception ===
Professional ratings
Review scores
Source	Rating
The A.V. Club	B+
SFX Magazine	3.5/5 stars
TV Fanatic	3/5 stars
CultBox	7/10 stars
IndieWire	B−
IGN	8.5
New York Magazine	4/5 stars
The Daily Telegraph	3/5 stars

The episode received generally positive reviews. Digital Spy said the episode "should have been 15 minutes longer" and "crammed too many ideas into 45 minutes." Ben Lawrence, writing in The Daily Telegraph, noted that "in a show that is sometimes rather burdened by the need to maintain clever story arcs, Time Heist was a standalone episode that allowed some breathing space." Den of Geek stated that it was "A solid, fun episode of Who... Not the best, but enjoyable. It came together well" and that it "had enough in the tank to keep us happily entertained for 45 minutes".

Writing for SFX, Nick Setchfield praised director Douglas Mackinnon's "visual flair", but felt the episode as a whole was "solid, mid-tier Who but... not the smooth criminal it could have been." In a review for the Radio Times, Patrick Mulkern said the episode was "singularly unengaging" despite being based on an interesting concept. Mulkern did, however, praise the performances of Jenna Coleman and Peter Capaldi, described as "the right man for the job but doesn’t always get the material he deserves."
