= Mummy on the Orient Express =

249 – "Mummy on the Orient Express"
- Doctor Who episode

Cast
- Doctor: Peter Capaldi – Twelfth Doctor
- Companion: Jenna Coleman – Clara Oswald
- Others: Samuel Anderson – Danny Pink; Frank Skinner – Perkins; David Bamber – Captain Quell; John Sessions – Gus (voice); Daisy Beaumont – Maisie; Janet Henfrey – Mrs Pitt; Christopher Villiers – Professor Moorhouse; Foxes – Singer; Jamie Hill – Foretold; Scott Stevenson - Chef

Production
- Directed by: Paul Wilmshurst
- Written by: Jamie Mathieson
- Produced by: Peter Bennett
- Executive producers: Steven Moffat; Brian Minchin
- Music by: Murray Gold
- Series: Series 8
- Running time: 47 minutes
- First broadcast: 11 October 2014

Chronology
← Preceded by "Kill the Moon"	Followed by → "Flatline"

"Mummy on the Orient Express" is the eighth episode of the eighth series of the British science fiction television programme Doctor Who. It was first broadcast on BBC One on 11 October 2014. The episode was written by Jamie Mathieson, and directed by Paul Wilmshurst. The episode's title and premise are a take on the Agatha Christie novel Murder on the Orient Express.

In the episode, the alien time traveller the Doctor (Peter Capaldi) investigates the deaths of passengers on board a space-bound train, who claim to have seen a mummy that is not visible to others prior to their deaths.

The episode was watched by 7.11 million viewers and received positive reviews from television critics.

== Plot ==
Clara is ready to go on one "last hurrah". She allows the Twelfth Doctor to take her aboard a space-bound train modelled after the Orient Express. Unknown to Clara, the train's computer Gus has enticed the Doctor along with many other scientists there. They learn of the death of Mrs. Pitt after witnessing a mummy that no other passenger could see attack her, which makes the Doctor curious. The Doctor discovers the death of Mrs. Pitt and similar deaths on the train occurred exactly 66 seconds after lights flickered nearby; this follows the legend of a supernatural being called the Foretold.

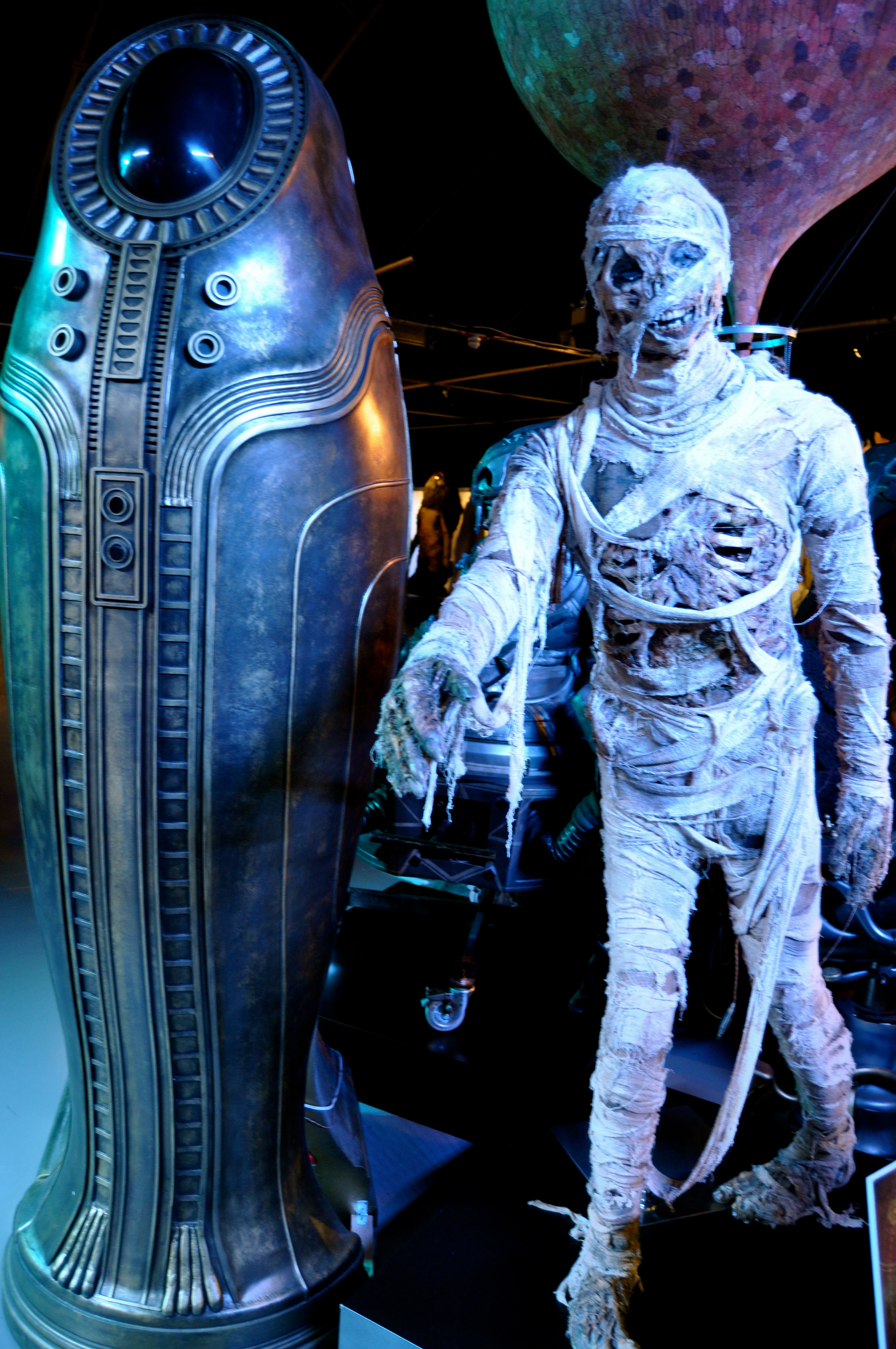
The Foretold, as shown at the Doctor Who Experience

When the Doctor expresses suspicion at the number of scientists gathered, the facade of the Orient Express disappears, revealing a laboratory; Gus informs the passengers they are now to study the Foretold to reverse engineer whatever technology it uses. The Doctor also realises the sarcophagus Clara and Mrs. Pitt's granddaughter Maisie had found in the storage car is for capturing the Foretold.

Professor Moorhouse and Captain Quell are the next targets killed by the Foretold. The Doctor and chief engineer Perkins realize that the Foretold is draining energy from its victims using phase-shifting technology. Perkins also observes that the victims were the medically weakest on the train. When Perkins reveals that Maisie is likely next due to her trauma, Clara lies to Maisie to bring her to the laboratory. Maisie sees the Foretold; the Doctor quickly draws on her memories to trick the Foretold into targeting him instead. In the 66 seconds, the Doctor successfully identifies the Foretold as a modified stealth soldier of a long-ago war and offers surrender to tell the Foretold that the war is over. The Foretold, finally released from its duty, offers the Doctor a salute before it disappears into a pile of dust, leaving behind its phase-shifting device.

The Doctor evacuates Clara and the passengers to the TARDIS, using the Foretold's device, and drops off the passengers to a nearby planet. He tells Clara that he tried hacking Gus to find who brought everyone to the train but Gus activated a self-destruct to keep the truth hidden. The Doctor explains that sometimes the only choices are bad choices and that he would move on to the next of the Foretold's victims until he beat it. Danny phones Clara to ask if she has said her final goodbyes to the Doctor. As she hangs up, she lies to the Doctor that Danny accepts her continuing to travel with the Doctor.

=== Continuity ===
The question "Are you my mummy?" is a reference to the Ninth Doctor episodes "The Empty Child"/"The Doctor Dances" (2005). The Tenth Doctor repeats the question in "The Poison Sky" (2008).

The Doctor confesses to Clara that the mysterious force which enticed him to the Orient Express "even phoned the TARDIS once", recalling the final scene of "The Big Bang" (2010), where the Eleventh Doctor answers a call concerning "an Egyptian goddess loose on the Orient Express, in space".

The Twelfth Doctor is shown offering jelly babies to Professor Moorhouse, a tradition associated with past Doctors, particularly Tom Baker's Fourth Doctor.

Danny Pink reminds Clara that the Doctor is "not your boyfriend". This is what the Doctor himself tells her at the end of "Deep Breath" (2014).

== Production ==
=== Filming ===
The read-through for Mummy on the Orient Express took place on 1 May 2014. Shooting started on 20 May and finished on 10 June. The episode was primarily filmed in the studio, but the scene with the Doctor and Clara on the planet was shot in Limpert Bay in the Vale of Glamorgan.

=== Casting ===
Christopher Villers previously appeared in the classic serial The King's Demons (1983), and Janet Henfrey previously appeared in The Curse of Fenric (1989). Frank Skinner considers himself a die-hard Who fan, and he previously had appeared in the special The Five(ish) Doctors Reboot (2013).

== Broadcast and reception ==
Overnight ratings show that this episode was seen by 5.08 million viewers, a 22.1% share of the available audience and third for the night. The episode was watched by 7.11 million viewers according to the final viewing figures. On BBC America this episode was seen by 0.97 million viewers.

=== Critical reception ===
Professional ratings
Review scores
Source	Rating
The A.V. Club	A
Paste Magazine	8.3
TV Fanatic	4.5/5 stars
CultBox	4/5 stars
IndieWire	A
IGN	7.4
New York Magazine	4/5 stars
Digital Spy	4/5 stars
The Daily Telegraph	4/5 stars

"Mummy on the Orient Express" received positive reviews. The episode also received an AI score of 85; the highest of series 8 up to this episode.

Guardian columnist Dan Martin was positive towards the episode and praised the Mummy, saying, "At last, a proper new scary monster to get us behind the sofa," something he felt had been lacking so far in series 8. He called it "a triumph of production design matched with imagination," and praised Jamie Mathieson, who was writing for the show for the first time, for blending "cool monsters" and "awkward Tardis dynamics." He did, however, feel that the reveal of the monster's true nature was "underwhelming." Ben Lawrence of The Daily Telegraph was positive toward the episode and awarded it four stars out of five. He praised the style of the episode and its ability to make the viewer a part of it: "as a viewer you felt hemmed in by the train’s narrow corridors, stalked by an invisible creature that could strike at any moment." He believed that Frank Skinner "started well" as Perkins but more impressive was David Bamber, describing his performance as Captain Quell as "poignant," and praised the development of the relationship between the Doctor and Clara.

Morgan Jeffrey of Digital Spy praised the episode, giving it four stars out of five. He praised the chemistry of the two leads, Peter Capaldi and Jenna Coleman, saying they "remain an utterly magnetic coupling on-screen," citing the final TARDIS scene and the beach scene as "magic." He felt that the main problem of the episode was the decision to keep the two apart. He was positive towards Skinner's "genuine love for Doctor Who", which meant he was "practically beaming throughout," and called him "an endearing replacement" for Clara in the episode. He thought that like the previous episode "Kill the Moon", "Mummy on the Orient Express", had a Philip Hinchcliffe vibe too, and that "'Mummy' is a joy, with excellent production design and a roster of perfectly-pitched performances all adding up to create an enchanting atmosphere," and believed it had a "wonderful mood," which felt like "vintage Doctor Who." Tim Liew, writing for Metro, was positive towards "Mummy", calling it "another strong standalone story. ... [The] period costumes helped create a distinctive look and feel, the mummified Foretold was well realised and the repeated use of the 66-second countdown clock injected a real sense of pace and jeopardy." Neela Debnath of The Independent praised the guest stars, Foxes and Skinner, saying Skinner "acts his socks off." She remained critical of Clara, arguing that "her poorly conceived and written character fails to charm," despite praising Coleman's acting. Overall she felt that the episode was "a delightful outer-space romp."

Ewan Spence gave the episode a positive review in Forbes. He praised the "fantastic core principle" to the plot. However, he was disappointed with the run time, believing it would have benefited from another five minutes, citing some areas that could have been explored further, particularly the escape from the train. He praised the cast and the lead, reflecting that "The Doctor infects Capaldi's performance. Drawing on his love for the series I could see the influences of many of the previous actors to take on the role," and praised the development of the Doctor and Clara's relationship. He called Mathieson's script "an impressive debut." For The A.V. Club, Alasdair Wilkins awarded the episode a perfect "A" grade. He said, "When the time comes to write the final accounting of the 12th Doctor—and hopefully we won’t need to do that for a little while yet—'Mummy On The Orient Express' will loom large. This episode is a triumph for Peter Capaldi." He added that it was "the latest superb episode in a strong season" and that "Peter Capaldi's performance is enough by itself to elevate this story to classic status, but Jamie Mathieson's script provides him excellent support".

== In print ==
Mummy on the Orient Express
- Author: Jane Rollason
- Series: Doctor Who novelisations
- Publisher: Pearson Education
- Publication date: 15 June 2018
- ISBN: 978-1292205830

Pearson Education published a novelisation of this episode by Jane Rollason for students of English language reading 24 May 2018.
