= Dark Water (Doctor Who) =

252a – "Dark Water"
- Doctor Who episode
- Missy reveals her true identity as the Master to a horrified Doctor. The climax was removed from all preview copies of the episode, and the actors involved recorded their lines in ADR to hide the reveal from spectators.

Cast
- Doctor: Peter Capaldi – Twelfth Doctor
- Companion: Jenna Coleman – Clara Oswald
- Others: Samuel Anderson – Danny Pink; Michelle Gomez – Missy; Sheila Reid – Gran; Chris Addison – Seb; Andrew Leung – Dr Chang; Nigel Betts – Mr Armitage; Joan Blackham – Woman; Antonio Bourouphael – Boy; Jeremiah Krage – Cyberman

Production
- Directed by: Rachel Talalay
- Written by: Steven Moffat
- Produced by: Peter Bennett
- Executive producers: Steven Moffat; Brian Minchin
- Music by: Murray Gold
- Series: Series 8
- Running time: First of two-part story, 46 minutes
- First broadcast: 1 November 2014

Chronology
← Preceded by "In the Forest of the Night"	Followed by → "Death in Heaven"

"Dark Water" is the eleventh episode of the eighth series of the British science fiction television programme Doctor Who. It was first broadcast on BBC One on 1 November 2014. The episode was written by showrunner and head writer Steven Moffat and was directed by Rachel Talalay. It is the first of a two-part story; the concluding episode "Death in Heaven", the finale of the eighth series, aired on 8 November.

In the episode, Danny Pink (Samuel Anderson) is killed, and finds himself in an afterlife called the Nethersphere. As the Doctor (Peter Capaldi) and his companion Clara Oswald (Jenna Coleman) try to find Danny, they find themselves in a facility that accommodates Cybermen, run by recurring character Missy (Michelle Gomez). In the episode's climax, Missy reveals her true identity as a female incarnation of the Doctor's arch-enemy The Master, last seen in the 2009–10 serial "The End of Time".

The episode was watched by 7.34 million viewers and received widespread critical acclaim, with the performances of Capaldi, Gomez, Coleman and Anderson being praised. Critics praised the horror strand of the episode, the maturity level, and the darker, more mature and morbid themes.

== Plot ==
Clara phones Danny to admit the truth of her travels with the Twelfth Doctor and that she loves Danny. Danny is killed by a car midway through the call. Clara attempts to use a hypnotic patch on the Doctor to blackmail him into saving Danny. The Doctor eventually reveals that the patch did not work on him; he instead used it on Clara to see how far she was willing to go to save Danny. He offers to try and locate Danny in the afterlife. When Clara asks why he's still willing to help her even after her betrayal, the Doctor assures that her actions will not change how much he cares about Clara.

Clara focuses on Danny's location with the TARDIS telepathic interface. The Doctor and Clara arrive at a mausoleum called the 3W Institute which holds several tanks of human skeletons submerged in a substance called Dark Water which hides the exoskeletons that support the skeletons. The Doctor and Clara meet Missy. The scientist Dr Chang explains to them that 3W was created to protect the dead after voices heard within white noise suggested the dead are aware of their bodies being cremated.

Danny is greeted by Seb in the afterlife called the Nethersphere. A meeting is arranged between Danny and a young boy he accidentally killed in Afghanistan. Danny receives a call from Clara at 3W. The Doctor leaves with Chang to investigate while Clara takes the call. Not wishing Clara to die, Danny does not convince her that he is really Danny, and tricks her into ending the call. Danny almost deletes his emotions but hesitates when he sees the boy.

The shot of the Cybermen emerging from St Paul's Cathedral was intended as an homage to the similar shots from the 1968 serial The Invasion.

Missy instructs the skeletons to rise and begins draining the tanks. She kills Chang. The skeletons are revealed to be Cybermen. Missy tells the Doctor that dying minds are uploaded to the Nethersphere—a Time Lord hard drive—where the emotions are deleted, and the mind is downloaded into upgraded Cyberman bodies. The Doctor realises that Missy is a Time Lady. The Doctor exits 3W and finds that it is inside St Paul's Cathedral. Missy reveals her identity as a female incarnation of the Master. Clara is trapped in Chang's laboratory with another Cyberman.

== Production ==
The read through for "Dark Water" took place on 12 June 2014. Filming began soon afterwards, on 16 June 2014. Locations for the episode included Cardiff, Pontypool and St. Paul's Cathedral. When filming the episode's climax, Peter Capaldi and Michelle Gomez mouthed their lines as the Doctor and Missy—recorded later using automated dialogue replacement—to hide the revelation from all spectators of the filming. To further ensure there was no leak, the climax was removed from all preview copies of the episode.

=== Cast notes ===
Sheila Reid made her second appearance as Clara's grandmother, having been introduced in "The Time of the Doctor"; she had previously appeared in Vengeance on Varos in 1985. Chris Addison appears as Seb.

== Broadcast and reception ==
=== Preview release ===
Scenes of "Dark Water" were removed from the DVD previews sent to reviewers, and a media blackout had been imposed on any plot details that were not released by the BBC. One notable scene removed by the BBC was the revelation of Missy's identity.

=== Ratings ===
Overnight viewing figures were estimated at 5.27 million. It was watched by a total of 7.34 million viewers. The episode achieved an Appreciation Index score of 85. In the US, the episode was watched by an estimated 1.02 million on BBC America.

=== Critical reception ===
Professional ratings
Review scores
Source	Rating
The A.V. Club	B
Paste Magazine	8.6
SFX Magazine	4.5/5 stars
TV Fanatic	4.7/5 stars
CultBox	4/5 stars
IndieWire	A+
IGN	8.4
New York Magazine	4/5 stars
Radio Times	4/5 stars
Digital Spy	4/5 stars
The Daily Telegraph	5/5 stars
Daily Mirror	4/5 stars

The episode received critical acclaim. Michael Hogan of The Daily Telegraph gave it five stars out of five and called it "bone-rattling and suitably spooky fare". He praised the source of everyday fears such as death for the horror and praised the performances of Capaldi, Jenna Coleman, Samuel Anderson and Gomez. Neela Debnath of The Independent said that the episode was "sad, funny, scary, romantic" and "is everything you could ask for from a Doctor Who finale the day after Halloween." Richard Edwards of SFX gave the episode four and a half stars out of five, claiming "...in a series of great Capaldi performances, this is one of the best". He praised the opening premise and the big reveal at the end and also commented on its allusions to The Tomb of the Cybermen and The Invasion.

Matt Risley of IGN praised the episode for its "tense and traumatic dose of Who", but was critical of the lack of action, which usually went hand-in-hand with the Cybermen. Overall, he rated the first part of the finale an 8.4. Alaisdair Wilkins of The A.V. Club gave the episode a B rating, claiming that "Dark Water could be a good episode, or it could be a terrible one", indicating that it was only the first half of the story.

Despite the positive critical reception, the episode received criticism from viewers concerning the use of death and cremation in the storyline. The BBC defended the use of the themes in the show's context. The BBC also noted that it was stated several times that the truth may be distressing and that the Doctor dismissed this straight away.

== Critical analysis ==
A book length study of the serial (covering both "Dark Water" and "Death in Heaven"), was written by Philip Purser-Hallard, and published as part of The Black Archive series from Obverse Books in 2016.

The serial was covered in volume 79 of the Doctor Who: The Complete History book series, which reprinted Andrew Pixley's Archive features from Doctor Who Magazine and the various Doctor Who Magazine Special Editions, as well as new articles created specifically for the book.
