= The Caretaker (Doctor Who) =

247 – "The Caretaker"
- Doctor Who episode

Cast
- Doctor: Peter Capaldi – Twelfth Doctor
- Companion: Jenna Coleman – Clara Oswald
- Others: Samuel Anderson – Danny Pink; Ellis George – Courtney Woods; Edward Harrison – Adrian; Nigel Betts – Mr Armitage; Andy Gillies – CSO Matthew; Nanya Campbell – Noah; Joshua Warner-Campbell – Yashe; Oliver Barry-Brook – Kelvin; Ramone Morgan – Tobias; Winston Ellis – Mr Woods; Gracy Goldman – Mrs Woods; Diana Katis – Mrs Christopholou; Molly Griffiths - Angelina Christopholou; Jimmy Vee – Skovox Blitzer; Chris Addison – Seb

Production
- Directed by: Paul Murphy
- Written by: Gareth Roberts and Steven Moffat
- Produced by: Nikki Wilson
- Executive producers: Steven Moffat; Brian Minchin
- Music by: Murray Gold
- Series: Series 8
- Running time: 45 minutes
- First broadcast: 27 September 2014

Chronology
← Preceded by "Time Heist"	Followed by → "Kill the Moon"

"The Caretaker" is the sixth episode of the eighth series of the British science fiction television programme Doctor Who. It was first broadcast on BBC One on 27 September 2014. The episode was written by Gareth Roberts and Steven Moffat, and directed by Paul Murphy.

In the episode, the alien time traveller the Doctor (Peter Capaldi) goes under deep cover as the caretaker of Coal Hill School—the work place of his travelling companion Clara (Jenna Coleman)—to stop a world-threatening robot nearby called the Skovox Blitzer (Jimmy Vee). The Doctor also comes into conflict with Clara's boyfriend, former soldier Danny Pink (Samuel Anderson).

The episode was watched by 6.82 million viewers in the UK, and received positive reviews from television critics.

== Plot ==
Clara struggles to balance between the excitement of being the Twelfth Doctor's companion, the normality of teaching at Coal Hill School and keeping her relationship with Danny, a former soldier.

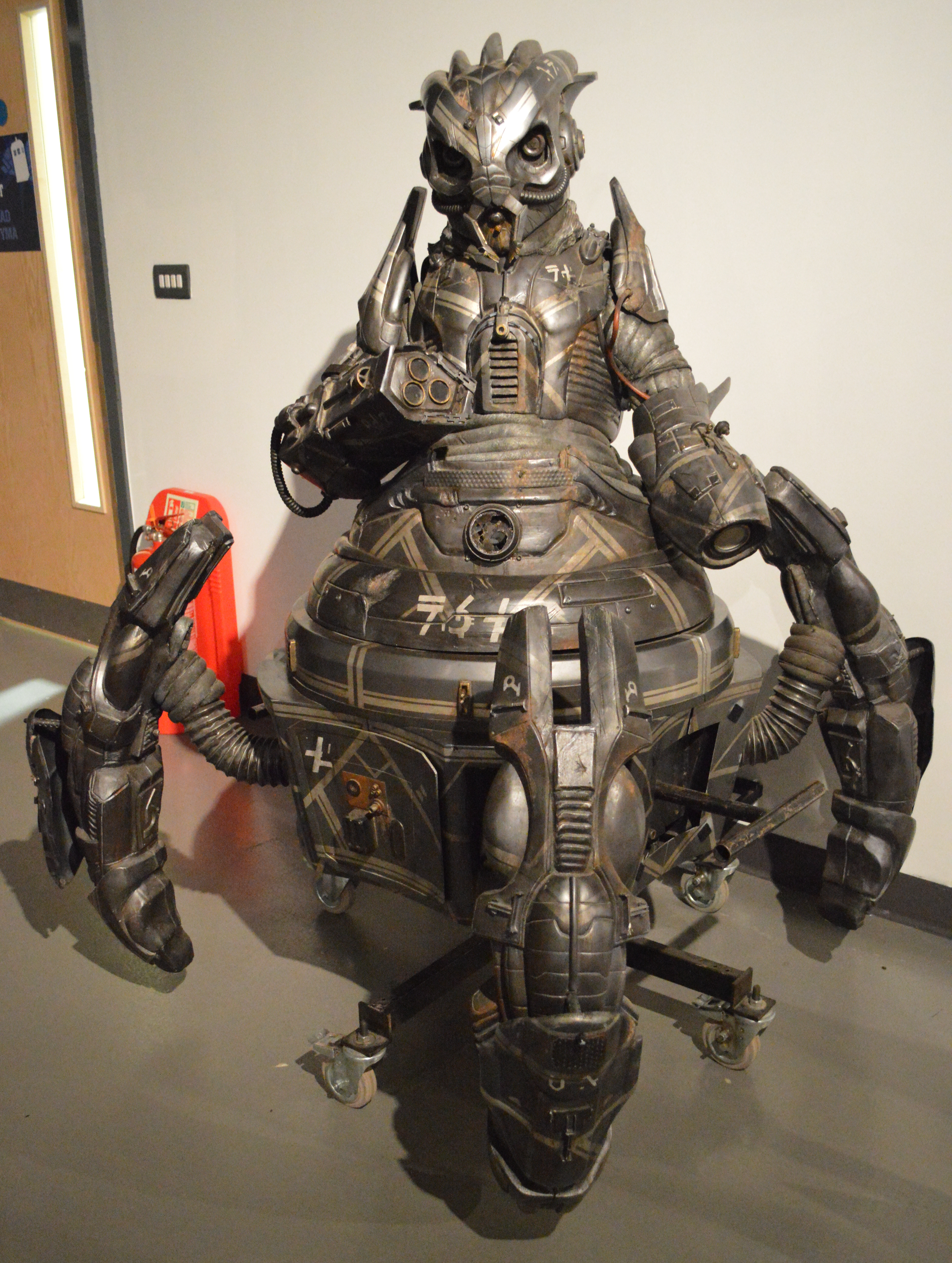
The Skovox Blitzer, as shown at the Doctor Who Experience

The Doctor alerts Clara he will need to go alone on his next outing under "deep cover", but Clara is surprised the next day that he has been hired as a temporary caretaker. Privately, the Doctor explains that a murderous robot, the Skovox Blitzer, is near the school, and has already killed a community support officer. If he does not intervene, it could destroy the Earth. He has been planting devices around the school to create a time displacement vortex in order to send the robot far into the future where it cannot harm anyone, and has an invisibility watch to help approach it.

Danny observes the Doctor's interactions with Clara and becomes suspicious of him. He inadvertently finds one of the devices the Doctor has planted and interferes with its settings. When the Doctor attempts to carry out his plan, Danny's change causes the Blitzer to only be displaced forward by 74 hours. After seeing the Doctor again approach Clara discussing this change in plan, Danny accosts Clara, believing she is an alien, during which Clara admits her love for Danny. The Doctor argues Clara has made a "boyfriend error" for dating Danny and argues with Danny, repeatedly dismissing him as a P.E. teacher (which becomes a nickname for Mr Pink) and refusing to accept he is a Maths teacher. Clara lets Danny use the invisibility watch to see how she interacts with the Doctor. However, the Doctor is aware of Danny's presence, and Danny compares the Doctor to an officer before leaving. Meanwhile, student Courtney Woods has come across the Doctor's TARDIS and starts following him around.

At Parents' Evening, the Blitzer rematerialises earlier than expected. The Doctor and Clara inadvertently trigger the Blitzer's self-destruct mechanism, but Danny's timely intervention allows them to force it to stand down. The Doctor offers Courtney a trip in the TARDIS as he leaves the inactive Blitzer in deep space, but Courtney ends up getting sick and throwing up within the TARDIS. On Earth, Danny tells Clara he is impressed with her resolve under the Doctor but not to let him push her too far, or otherwise their relationship will be over.

Meanwhile, the community support officer awakens in the Promised Land, also known as the Nethersphere. The interviewer, Seb, informs him of his death and their whereabouts, and states that Missy is too busy to deal with him.

=== Continuity ===
The pseudonym "John Smith" has been used by the Doctor multiple times throughout the show, starting in The Wheel in Space (1968).

The Doctor mentions River Song, who last appeared in "The Name of the Doctor" (2013).

The Seventh Doctor was mistaken as an applicant for the position of Caretaker of Coal Hill School in 1988's "Remembrance of the Daleks"

== Production ==
The read through for "The Caretaker" took place on 20 March 2014. Filming began soon afterwards, on 24 March 2014 at Bute Street and Lloyd George Avenue in Cardiff. Filming continued at The Maltings in Cardiff Bay and the former St Illtyd's Boys' College, Splott on 4 April 2014. Scenes were also filmed at Holton Primary School in Barry on 5 April 2014, and at Tonyrefail Comprehensive School, located in the South Wales valleys, on 8 April 2014. Principal photography was concluded on 11 April 2014; the final scene with Seb (portrayed by Chris Addison) was shot on 11 June 2014.

== Broadcast and reception ==
=== Broadcast ===
Overnight viewing figures showed an audience of 4.89 million. The episode was watched by a total of 6.82 million viewers. In the United States, the episode earned 0.96 million viewers. The episode received an Appreciation Index score of 83.

=== Critical reception ===
Professional ratings
Review scores
Source	Rating
The A.V. Club	A−
SFX Magazine	4/5 stars
TV Fanatic	4.3/5 stars
CultBox	7/10 stars
IndieWire	A−
IGN	7.9
New York Magazine	3/5 stars
Radio Times	5/5 stars
Digital Spy	4/5 stars
The Daily Telegraph	4/5 stars
Daily Mirror	4/5 stars

The episode received positive reviews. Richard Beech of Daily Mirror gave the episode 4 stars out of 5, calling it "funny, lighthearted, and thoroughly entertaining," and praised Capaldi's comic timing. Ceri Radford of The Daily Telegraph also gave it 4 stars out of 5 and praised Capaldi's performance. Simon Brew of Den of Geek called it "arguably one of the best [of series 8]." He too praised the comedic elements of the episode, and praised Roberts' storytelling skills. He praised Coleman and Anderson, calling them "excellent," and saying it was their "best performance of the series." Morgan Jeffery of Digital Spy gave the episode a positive review, calling it "Funny, warm and moving." However they were critical of the threat of the Blitzer. They praised Capaldi and his interpretation of the Doctor, calling it the "most complex and variable take on the Time Lord we've seen since Eccleston's." He gave it 4 stars out of 5.

Matt Risley of IGN gave the episode a positive review, praising the characterisation of Clara in the current series. He called The Caretaker "satisfying despite the occasional slip into soap opera silliness." He praised the acting of the three leads, but he too criticised the Blitzer, calling it "a design evoking the lovechild of a pew-pewing Jetsons maid knock-off and a Roomba gone haywire." Overall, he gave the episode 7.9 out of 10 (Good), saying "'The Caretaker' was emotionally engaging with dynamic dialogue," and called it a "Who win." Neela Debnath of The Independent gave the episode a negative review, calling it "A bland Earth-based adventure that failed to excite." However she did praise Ellis George, calling her "a star in the making," and her inclusion in the episode as "great."
