= Into the Dalek =

243 – "Into the Dalek"
- Doctor Who episode

Cast
- Doctor: Peter Capaldi – Twelfth Doctor
- Companion: Jenna Coleman – Clara Oswald
- Others: Zawe Ashton – Journey Blue; Michael Smiley – Colonel Morgan Blue; Samuel Anderson – Danny Pink; Laura dos Santos – Gretchen; Ben Crompton – Ross; Bradley Ford – Fleming; Michelle Morris – School Secretary; Nigel Betts – Mr Armitage; Ellis George – Courtney; Barnaby Edwards – Dalek; Nicholas Briggs – Voice of the Daleks; Michelle Gomez – Missy (uncredited)

Production
- Directed by: Ben Wheatley
- Written by: Phil Ford and Steven Moffat
- Produced by: Nikki Wilson
- Executive producers: Steven Moffat; Brian Minchin
- Music by: Murray Gold
- Series: Series 8
- Running time: 45 minutes
- First broadcast: 30 August 2014

Chronology
← Preceded by "Deep Breath"	Followed by → "Robot of Sherwood"

"Into the Dalek" is the second episode of the eighth series of the British science fiction television programme Doctor Who. It was written by Phil Ford and Steven Moffat, and directed by Ben Wheatley, and first broadcast on BBC One on 30 August 2014.

In the episode, the alien time traveller the Doctor (Peter Capaldi) and his companion Clara Oswald (Jenna Coleman) enter the body of a damaged Dalek captured by rebels to determine what is making the usually-hate-filled creature "good".

It was watched by 5.2 million viewers in the UK on its initial transmission, according to unofficial overnight figures, taking a 24.7 per cent share of the entire TV audience and making it the second-highest rated programme of the evening, with the final numbers giving a total of 7.29 million viewers, and received positive reviews, with the characterisation of the Dalek being acclaimed.

== Plot ==
Danny Pink, a former soldier emotionally scarred from his experiences, begins teaching Mathematics at Coal Hill School in the present. Clara, an English teacher at the school, invites him out for a drink. He agrees. Back at her office, Clara is briefed by the Twelfth Doctor about a damaged Dalek taken aboard the human rebel ship Aristotle in the future that declares his own race must be destroyed. Clara agrees to assist his efforts to help the "good" Dalek, despite the Doctor's contention that Daleks cannot be turned good.

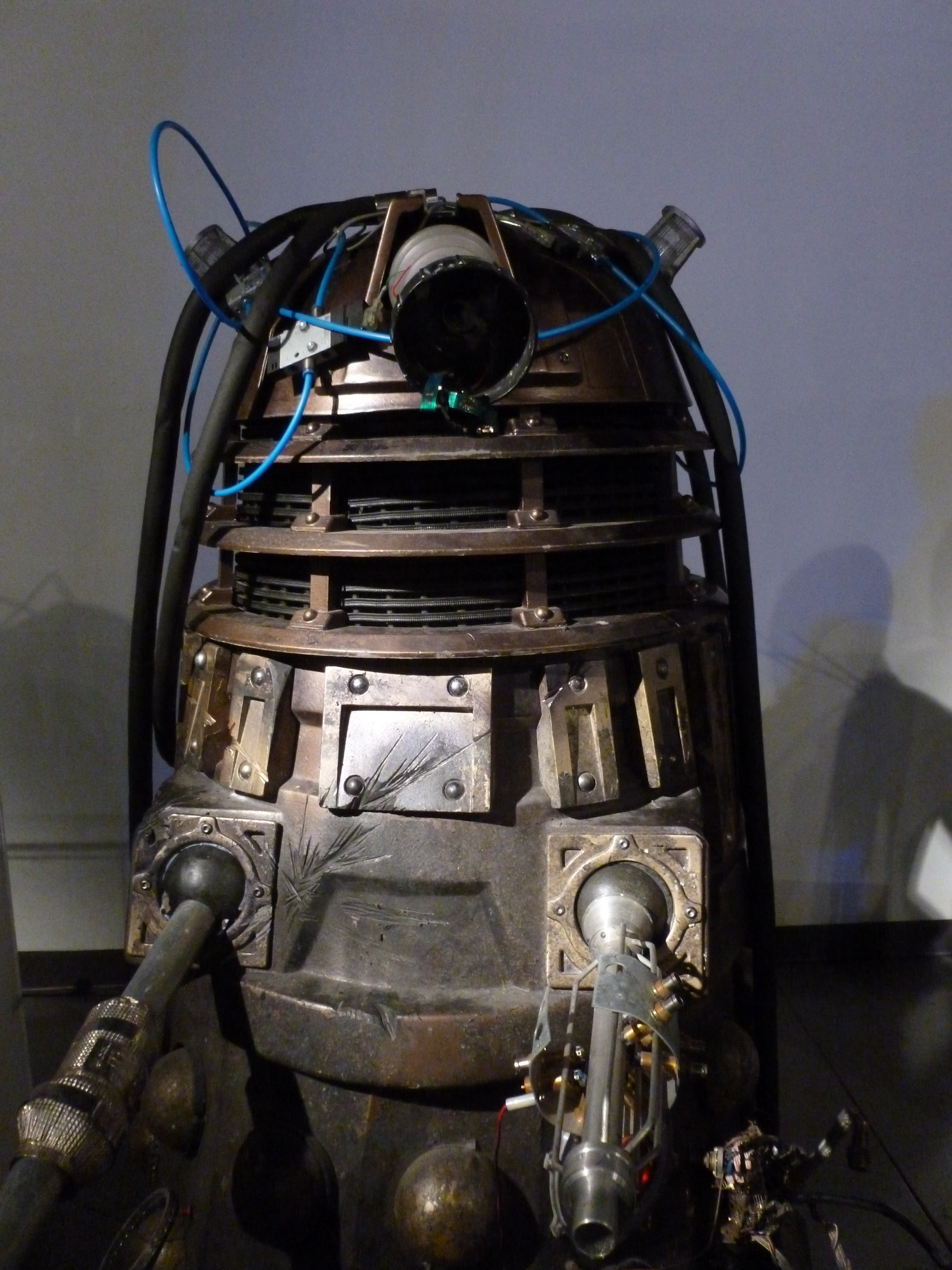
The damaged Dalek in this episode, on display at the Doctor Who Experience.

The Doctor, Clara, and three rebel soldiers are miniaturised so they can enter the Dalek—nicknamed "Rusty" by the Doctor—to determine what is making him good. Entering Rusty, they come upon his "cortex vault", which the Doctor describes as Dalek technology designed to suppress any developing compassion within the living mutant inside the shell, as well as store all of his memories. Rusty, speaking to the Doctor, relates the beauty he had witnessed in the galaxy, including the creation of a star. Rusty drew from this that Daleks must be destroyed for wanting to destroy that beauty. The Doctor repairs Rusty's power cell. This unintentionally erases Rusty's memories and reverts him to his normal thinking pattern.

Rusty contacts the Dalek mothership, which sends other Daleks to destroy the rebel ship. Inside Rusty, Clara convinces the Doctor to reconsider his conviction that Daleks are irreversibly "evil". Inside the cortex vault, Clara awakens Rusty's memory of seeing a star's creation. The Doctor then links his mind to Rusty's consciousness, showing him the beauty of the universe. However, Rusty also assimilates the Doctor's own deep-rooted hatred towards the Daleks. Rusty exterminates his fellow Daleks to stop them from destroying the rebel ship, then sends a retreat signal to the Dalek mothership, causing it to believe the Aristotle has self-destructed. The Doctor, disturbed that Rusty saw only hatred within him, becomes distraught that he had failed to create a "good" Dalek. Though Rusty acknowledges that he himself is not a good Dalek, he reassures the Doctor that he is a good Dalek. Rusty then departs to continue his crusade against other Daleks.

The Doctor turns down the surviving soldier Journey's offer to travel with him, telling her that he wishes that she was not a soldier, hence re-iterating his non-violent stance. The Doctor returns Clara to her office moments after she left. On leaving, she bumps into Danny, who is glad his being an ex-soldier does not put her off dating him.

=== Continuity ===
Scenes from "Dalek" (2005) and "Journey's End" (2008) can be seen in the background as the Doctor 'merges' with Rusty's mind. The Doctor refers to his first encounter with the Daleks on Skaro in The Daleks (1963–64).

== Production ==
Co-writer and executive producer Steven Moffat conceived the idea while discussing possible concepts for a Doctor Who computer game.

The read-through for the episode took place on 17 December 2013, the same day as "Deep Breath". Filming began on 25 January 2014, and took place at the Uskmouth power station, which had previously served as a location for the 2011 Christmas special, "The Doctor, the Widow and the Wardrobe". Filming also took place in St Athan, Newport, and a hangar outside Cardiff. Regular filming concluded on 18 February 2014. The last scene to be filmed was the one featuring Gretchen (Laura dos Santos) and Missy (Michelle Gomez), which was filmed concurrently with the similar scene with Half-Face Man from "Deep Breath" on 23 May 2014. Since Wheatley was unavailable on the date, an uncredited Rachel Talalay directed both scenes; she consulted Wheatley and attempted to incorporate his ideas.

== Broadcast and reception ==
=== Pre-broadcast leak ===
As part of the series 8 leaks, both the script and a rough cut of the episode were leaked online from a server in Miami. Despite the fact that the initial online copy of the episode contained a glitch that prevented downloading, a workable version found its way online by the second week of August 2014.

=== Promotion ===
Two clips from the episode were featured alongside an interview with Peter Capaldi on BBC News on 7 August 2014. On 25 August, a ten-second clip was released showing the Doctor's reunion with a lone Dalek. The same clips were re-released on 27 August in slightly extended form.

=== Ratings ===
"Into the Dalek" was watched by 5.2 million viewers in the UK upon its initial transmission, according to unofficial overnight figures, taking a 24.7 per cent share of the entire TV audience and making it the second-highest rated programme of the evening. The episode was watched by 7.29 million people according to the final viewing figures, making it the 2nd most watched programme over the entire week on BBC1 and the 9th most watched over all channels. In the United States, the première airing on BBC America had an audience of 1.22 million viewers, well below the 2.19 million viewers earned on "Deep Breath". The episode received an Audience Appreciation Index score of 84, considered Excellent.

=== Critical reception ===
Professional ratings
Review scores
Source	Rating
The A.V. Club	B
Paste Magazine	8.4
SFX Magazine	3.5/5 stars
TV Fanatic	4.5/5 stars
CultBox	4/5 stars
IndieWire	A
IGN	8.4
New York Magazine	3/5 stars
Digital Spy	4/5 stars
The Daily Telegraph	4/5 stars

"Into the Dalek" received largely positive reviews, with the characterization of the Dalek being acclaimed. Simon Brew of Den of Geek wrote that the episode "stakes one hell of a claim... as a series highlight," and that it was "a really good, really entertaining episode," noting the similarities to 2005's "Dalek". Brew praised the new characterisation for Clara and Capaldi's emergence as the Doctor. The Guardian found the episode to be "better than we might have expected." They singled out the character development of Zawe Ashton's character in such a short period of time, and Ben Wheatley for "evoking a genuine sense of claustrophobic menace." Terry Ramsey of The Daily Telegraph gave the episode four stars out of five, praising Capaldi: "It may be hard to believe in a good Dalek, but after Saturday night it is easy to believe this will be a good Doctor." IGN also praised the episode, particularly Ford and Moffat's script, stating that it "evolves along with its characters". They ultimately labelled the episode "an entertaining new take on a classic old foe", awarding it 8.4 out of 10.

Neela Debnath of The Independent was positive regarding the episode, calling it "A classic sci-fi adventure with all the spectacle of a blockbuster," while praising the new dynamic between The Doctor and Clara. Tim Liew of Metro commented, "I rather enjoyed this episode." He was also positive about the character development for Jenna Coleman and noted, "the tight focus on a single enemy makes this the most menacing Dalek episode since 'Dalek'." Morgan Jeffery of Digital Spy felt the episode was an improvement over the series' opening episode and that it "felt like the proper debut of our new lead." He felt the dynamic between Capaldi and Coleman was very similar to that of Christopher Eccleston and Billie Piper, and called the episode "smart, stirring and visually spectacular," awarding the episode four stars out of five.

Forbes gave a negative review of the episode, criticising the Daleks' appearance so soon after Capaldi's entrance, saying, "It feels like the BBC have a lack of confidence in the public accepting Capaldi as The Doctor," and the "flawed" concept of the episode. They were critical of the characterisation of Capaldi's Doctor: "the modern Doctor is not the irascible, self-centred William Hartnell of those early episodes." However, they were positive about the characterisation of Clara and overall said, "Nonetheless, this action-packed second episode made me much more likely to tune in next week than last week’s opener.
