= Gypsy Woman (film) =

2001 film by Sheree Folkson

- DVD cover
- Directed by: Sheree Folkson
- Written by: Steven Knight
- Starring: Jack Davenport; Neve McIntosh; Nick Brimble; Julian Wadham; Hazel Monaghan; Jack Warren
- Cinematography: Witold Stock
- Edited by: Nick Arhurs
- Music by: Joe Strummer
- Production companies: Overseas Filmgroup; Wave Pictures
- Distributed by: Sky Pictures
- Release dates: 9 September 2001 (Germany); 2 July 2005 (UK DVD)
- Running time: 87 minutes
- Countries: United Kingdom; Isle of Man
- Language: English

Gypsy Woman is a 2001 film directed by Sheree Folkson and written by Steven Knight, filmed on location in London and The Isle of Man. It is a romantic comedy, set against the backdrop of the Black Mountains, Wales.

== Plot overview ==
Leon Hawthorne (Jack Davenport) is a recently-widowed property developer bringing up his young daughter on his own. While at a coroner's inquest into the death of one of his workers, Hawthorne meets the dead man's widow, Natalie (Neve McIntosh). A bright and exotic gypsy woman, Natalie's beauty captivates Leon, and after the verdict of the court, he sets out to track her down. This takes him out into the countryside, on an unexpected journey full of humour, danger and self-discovery, as he enters the world of the gypsies. With the help of Leon's and Natalie's daughters, they just might manage to sort it out.
