= Peter Bennett (producer) =

British television producer

- Occupation: Television producer
- Years active: 1976–present

Peter Bennett is a British television producer, although he has predominantly worked as a first assistant director.

Bennett's credits as a first AD began with Emily (1976) and has continued with many other feature films, including The Mummy, The Mummy Returns, Alexander and Syriana, as well as the television series Minder, Agatha Christie's Poirot, Sea of Souls, the revived Doctor Who and Torchwood.

He has also worked as a location manager (For Your Eyes Only, Octopussy and Indiana Jones and the Temple of Doom) and as a production manager (Doctor Who).

In 2008, he produced the Torchwood serial Children of Earth, which led to his appointment as full-time producer (alongside Tracie Simpson) on the fifth series of Doctor Who, broadcast in 2010.

In 2014, he returned to Doctor Who to produce (alongside fellow producer Nikki Wilson) the eighth, ninth, and tenth series of Doctor Who which aired in 2014, 2015, and 2017.

== Producing credits ==
Production	Notes	Broadcaster
Torchwood	Children of Earth (2009)	BBC One
Doctor Who	"The Beast Below" (2010); "Victory of the Daleks" (2010); "The Hungry Earth" / "Cold Blood" (2010); "The Pandorica Opens" / "The Big Bang" (2010); "Listen" (2014); "Time Heist" (2014); "Kill the Moon" (2014); "Mummy on the Orient Express" (2014); "Dark Water" / "Death in Heaven" (2014); "The Magician's Apprentice" / "The Witch's Familiar" (2015); "The Zygon Invasion" / "The Zygon Inversion" (2015); "Heaven Sent" (2015); "Hell Bent" (2015); "The Return of Doctor Mysterio" (2016); "The Pilot" (2017); "Smile" (2017); "Extremis" (2017); "The Pyramid at the End of the World" (2017); "World Enough and Time" (2017); "The Doctor Falls" (2017); "Twice Upon a Time" (2017)	BBC One

Preceded by Nikki Wilson	Doctor Who Producer; 2010	Succeeded by Patrick Schweitzer

Preceded by Marcus Wilson	Doctor Who Producer; 2014	Succeeded by None
