= Douglas Mackinnon =

Scottish director

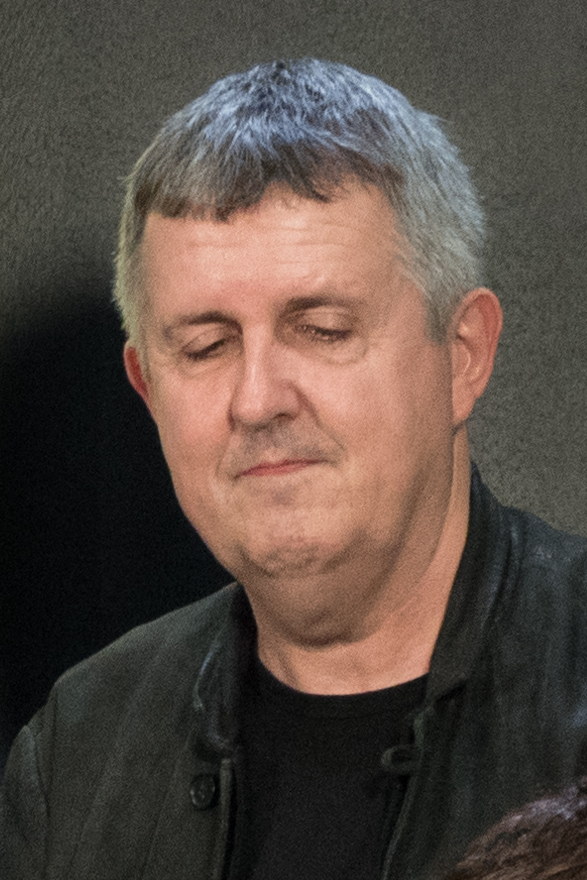
- Mackinnon in 2018
- Occupation: Director
- Years active: 1987–present
- Notable work: Good Omens, Doctor Who, Line of Duty, Sherlock
- Awards: 2016 Emmy for Outstanding TV Movie and Best Director Film/TV in the 2016 BAFTA Scotland Awards (Sherlock: The Abominable Bride)

Douglas Mackinnon is a Scottish film and television director from Portree, Isle of Skye.

He has directed many episodes of television drama and at least three television films. His work includes Bodies, Gentlemen's Relish, Robin Hood, The Vice and numerous episodes of Doctor Who.

He also directed all twelve episodes of the first two seasons of Terry Pratchett and Neil Gaiman's Good Omens.

== Early life ==
Mackinnon attended Portree High School on the Isle of Skye between 1967 and 1980. He then attended the National Film and Television School between 1985–1990.

== Career ==
=== Film and television director ===
Mackinnon directed the music video for The Proclaimers' song "Letter from America" in 1987. He then created the documentary series Home about the Isle of Skye. This series captured Skye Camanachd winning the Camanachd Cup in 1990. In the 1990s, he directed episodes of several television drama series, including The Bill, Soldier Soldier and London's Burning.

He made his feature film directorial debut with The Flying Scotsman (2006), which was the gala premiere at the Edinburgh Festival in 2006 and was consequently picked up for worldwide distribution by MGM. He then went on to direct the first three episodes of Jekyll (2007) starring James Nesbitt, Michelle Ryan and Gina Bellman. The show had nominations in the Emmys and the Rose D'Or for James Nesbitt.

He worked on eight episodes of the BBC's long-running sci-fi series Doctor Who between 2008 and 2015. He returned to work for the BBC to direct five episodes of the award-winning television series Line of Duty between 2012 and 2014. He then went on to direct a one-off episode of Sherlock, "The Abominable Bride", which won the Primetime Emmy Award for Outstanding Television Movie, for the BBC in 2016.

Mackinnon was the lead director and executive producer of Knightfall, a drama series for the History Channel/A&E Network, between 2016 and 2017. He also worked as a director on two episodes of the TV series Outlander in 2016.

In 2017, Mackinnon was a director and executive producer of an adaption of Good Omens by Neil Gaiman and Terry Pratchett. It starred Michael Sheen and David Tennant and was created for Amazon and the BBC. All episodes were released on Amazon Prime Video on May 31, 2019, and aired weekly on BBC Two in the UK between January 15 and February 19, 2020. Among other accolades, the television series won the Ray Bradbury Award for Outstanding Dramatic Presentation at the Nebula Awards.

=== Other occupations ===
Mackinnon worked as a report author for the Scottish Government between July 2009 and September 2009 and reported on the state of the Scottish television production sector for the Culture minister.

Mackinnon was a committee member of BAFTA in Scotland between August 2010 and August 2011, and a committee member of the Scottish Screen Academy between June 2009 and June 2012.

== Selected television directing credits ==
Production	Notes	Broadcaster
Home	Documentary (1990)	N/A
The Vice	"Daughters" (1999)	ITV
Gentlemen's Relish	TV movie (2001)	N/A
Bodies	Numerous episodes (2004 - 2006)	BBC Three
Jekyll	"Episode One" (2007); "Episode Two" (2007); "Episode Three" (2007)	BBC One
Doctor Who	"The Sontaran Stratagem" (2008); "The Poison Sky" (2008); "The Power of Three (2012); "Cold War" (2013); "Listen" (2014); "Time Heist" (2014); "Flatline" (2014); "The Husbands of River Song" (2015)	BBC One
Sherlock	"The Abominable Bride" (2016)	BBC One
Outlander	"La Dame Blanche" (2016); "Untimely Resurrection" (2016)	Starz
Dirk Gently Holistic Detective Agency	Space Rabbit (2017); Fans of Wet Circles (2017)	Netflix
Knightfall	"Pilot" (2017); "Episode 2" (2017)	History
Good Omens	12 episodes	Amazon Prime
