= Sheree Folkson =

British film and television director

- Occupations: Film director, television director
- Years active: 1990–present

Sheree Folkson is a British film and television director.

Some of her television credits are American Horror Story, The Bill, Band of Gold, Doctor Who, The Young Person's Guide to Becoming a Rock Star, Casanova, Hope Springs, Truckers, Missed Call, the American series Ugly Betty, Penny Dreadful: City of Angels, Bridgerton, Sex/Life and Will Trent.

Her film credits include Gypsy Woman (2001), My Family and Other Animals (2005) and The Decoy Bride (2011) starring David Tennant.
