= Danny Pink =

- Doctor Who character
- Samuel Anderson as Danny Pink
- First appearance: "Into the Dalek" (2014)
- Last appearance: "Last Christmas" (2014)
- Portrayed by: Samuel Anderson; Remi Gooding (young)

In-universe information
- Full name: Rupert 'Danny' Henry Pink
- Nickname: 'P.E.'
- Species: Human; Cyberman (series 8 finale)
- Occupation: Sergeant in the British Army; Teacher of Mathematics (formerly)
- Affiliation: Twelfth Doctor; Clara Oswald
- Home: Earth

Danny Pink (born Rupert Henry Pink) is a fictional character in the long-running British science fiction television series Doctor Who. Created by Steven Moffat and portrayed by actor Samuel Anderson, he is a supporting character in the eighth series of the programme, first appearing in the episode, "Into the Dalek". He becomes the boyfriend of the Twelfth Doctor (Peter Capaldi)'s companion Clara Oswald (Jenna Coleman). Formerly a soldier, Danny now works as a Maths teacher at Coal Hill School. Danny and the Doctor come to disapprove of each other throughout the series, with the Doctor disliking Danny being a former soldier, while Clara's travels with the Doctor puts friction on her relationship with Danny. Throughout the series, Danny, the Doctor, and Clara develop a dynamic with each other, with multiple episodes exploring their relationships with each other. Danny is eventually killed and revived as a cyborg known as a Cyberman during the episodes "Dark Water" and "Death in Heaven". During the events of "Death in Heaven," the converted Danny dies while stopping antagonist the Master (Michelle Gomez)'s plot to turn the entire Earth into Cybermen.

Anderson auditioned for the role of Danny in late 2013, with his casting being announced in early 2014. Danny was intended by Moffat to be a comforting presence for Clara upon returning home from adventures with the Doctor, with the Doctor's negative opinion of Danny done to show the Doctor making a "tactical error" in judging someone.

Danny was met with an overall negative response from critics, with some disliking how he was characterised, but his relationship with the Doctor and his status as a soldier has been the subject of analysis.

== Appearances ==
Doctor Who is a long-running British science-fiction television series that began in 1963. It stars its protagonist, The Doctor, an alien who travels through time and space in a ship known as the TARDIS, as well as their travelling companions. When the Doctor dies, they can undergo a process known as "regeneration", completely changing the Doctor's appearance and personality. Throughout their travels, the Doctor often comes into conflict with various alien species and antagonists.

Danny Pink (Samuel Anderson) is first introduced in the 2014 episode "Into the Dalek". He is a new Maths teacher at Coal Hill Secondary School in London, having previously served as a soldier in British Army. He and Clara Oswald (Jenna Coleman) fall in love. In the episode "Listen" (2014), the pair are shown on a date, which goes poorly due to Danny assuming Clara would not understand his career in the Army due to her anti-war stance. In the TARDIS, Clara uses the TARDIS's "telepathic circuits" to try and travel to her childhood, but accidentally travels to Danny's. She meets a young Danny, named Rupert, and she inadvertently inspires him to be a soldier. Clara attempts to reconcile with Danny in the present, but Danny leaves after Clara reveals she knows his full name. The Twelfth Doctor (Peter Capaldi) introduces her to a man named Orson Pink, who hails from the future and is the descendant of Danny and a time traveller. Believing the descendant of a time traveller to be her, Clara goes to Danny and reconciles with him.

In "The Caretaker" (2014), an alien known as the Skovox Blitzer (Jimmy Vee) is drawn to the school by the Doctor, who is posing as Coal Hill's caretaker. He clashes with Danny, mocking his past in the Army and refusing to accept that he is a Maths teacher, mistaking and dismissing him as a P.E. teacher instead, and subsequently insists in calling him P.E. repeatedly. Danny later helps the Doctor stop the Blitzer, who acknowledges his assistance subtly, and gives Clara his blessing to continue travelling. Clara later tells him she has stopped travelling with the Doctor in "Kill the Moon" (2014), but she later continues to travel with the Doctor after changing her mind. He appears in "In the Forest of the Night" (2014), when Clara, Danny and a group of special needs students become stranded in central London, which has become overgrown by trees and plant-life, they are forced to call on the Doctor for help. Danny discovers Clara has continued travelling with the Doctor without telling him and insists on staying with the students when the Earth is seemingly about to be destroyed. Though the plant-life is revealed to have been a defense mechanism intended to save the Earth from a solar flare, with the planet being safe, Danny asks Clara to reveal the truth about the Doctor's travels to him at a later time.

During a phone call with Clara in "Dark Water" (2014), Danny is unexpectedly struck and killed by a car. Danny's consciousness is uploaded to a digital realm known as the Nethersphere. Clara and the Doctor, attempting to find where Danny has gone after death, go to the "3W Institute," where they discover the Master (Referred to as Missy) is planning to raise a Cyberman army using humanity's dead. She uploads those in the Nethersphere into Cyberman bodies. During "Death in Heaven" (2014), all who have died are brought back as Cybermen, including Danny. Missy intends to use a raincloud with Cyberman technology inside of it to eradicate the living humans and make them Cybermen as well. Danny resists having his emotions removed like the other Cybermen, allowing him to rebel against Missy and lead the Cybermen to all self-destruct in the clouds, destroying the raincloud and stopping Missy's plan. Danny's consciousness is sent to the Nethersphere, now collapsing due to Missy's apparent death after the cloud was destroyed. Though he has a chance to escape, he decides to sacrifice himself to bring a child he accidentally killed while he was a soldier back to life.

Danny later appears in a dream state in the 2014 episode "Last Christmas". When Clara is attacked by the parasitic Dream Crabs, Clara is sent into a dream where Danny appears as if he is still alive and living with Clara. He reveals the true nature of the dream world whilst 12 is present and offers Clara the choice to leave the dream or stay in it and wait for the Dream Crabs to kill her in the real world. Danny urges her to move on, and Clara leaves the dream.

A copy of Danny, created from Clara's memories, appears in the 2015 spin-off comic Spirits of the Jungle. The copy was generated by a living jungle, and aids the pair in stopping a weapon of war called the Hadax Ura from taking it over. Danny also appears in the 2020 audio drama War Wounds, where Danny sneaks aboard the TARDIS and accidentally winds up on an adventure with the Doctor.

== Casting and development ==
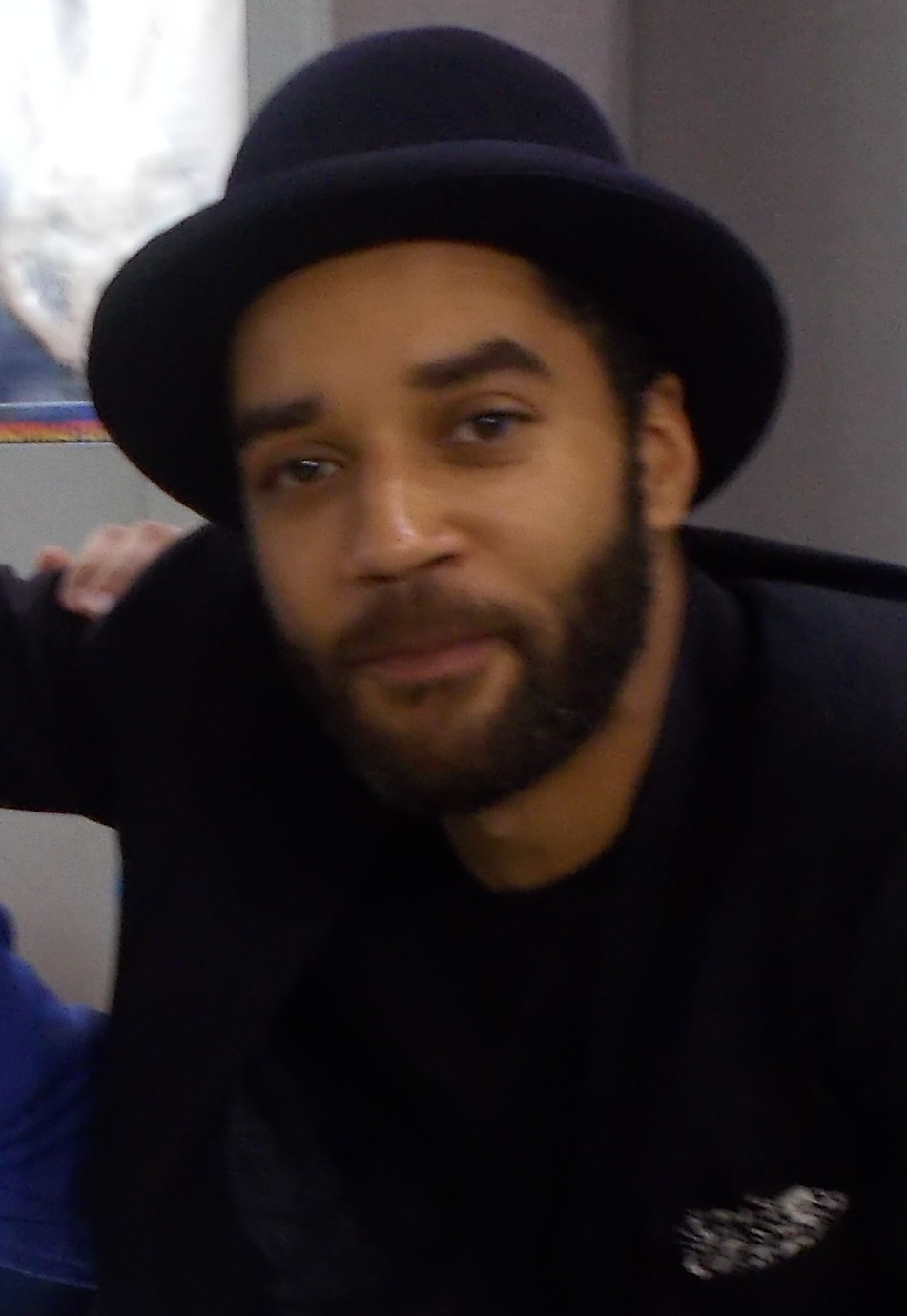
Samuel Anderson, pictured in 2015

The character of Danny was created by then-showrunner Steven Moffat. Originally called Danny Lawrence before having his last name changed to Pink during development, auditions were held for the part of Danny in late 2013, with Samuel Anderson being cast in the role. Initially under the impression he had only been cast for a smaller part, he was only explained the significance of Danny after his casting. On 24 February 2014, Samuel Anderson was announced as having been cast as Danny Pink for the programme's eighth series as a teacher at Coal Hill School. Anderson said that he was "excited" about joining the show.

Anderson confirmed that Danny would be Clara's love interest in August 2014 but made it clear that Danny would not be a companion, stating that he would be a stabilising presence for Clara when she comes home from adventures with the Doctor. He also described Danny as "lovable and huggable". The Doctor's dismissal of Danny due to his status as a former soldier was done by Moffat to show the Doctor making a "tactical error" in judging someone, with the Doctor's dismissal intended to come across as unfair.

Danny's first appearance aired on 30 August 2014 in the second episode of the series, "Into the Dalek". Initially, during development, Danny and Clara had already started dating off-screen, but this was changed to have them meet during the episode's events. It also set up the conflict the Doctor and Danny would have over the latter being a soldier via the reveal of the Doctor's dislike towards soldiers. "Listen" was made as a character piece, helping to develop the characters of the Doctor, Clara, and Danny, as well as Clara and Danny's relationship. "The Caretaker" was made to be the episode in which Clara's double life of adventuring with the Doctor and dating Danny collided, resulting in the Doctor meeting Danny for the first time and the pair's dynamic being formed. Danny would clash with the Doctor throughout the following episodes until his death in "Dark Water". The revelation of Danny's death was kept hidden from Anderson until he was given the script for "Dark Water". Anderson was later brought back for a return appearance in 2014's "Last Christmas".

During the series, Anderson also portrayed Orson Pink, a descendant of Danny's who appeared in "Listen". Remi Gooding also portrayed Danny as a child in the same episode. Anderson reprised the role of Danny for his appearance in the 2020 Big Finish Productions audio drama War Wounds.

== Reception and analysis ==
Dan Martin, writing for The Guardian, criticised Danny's characterisation, finding it to be passive-aggressive, and believing it to be unrealistic that the audience would sympathise with Danny. Michael Hogan from The Daily Telegraph criticised the general portrayal of male companion figures in Doctor Who, citing Danny, alongside other important male characters, as all "basically soppy, sappy, slightly annoying plus-ones to far superior females". The book Adventures Across Space and Time: A Doctor Who Reader characterised Danny as a "more competent and initially less irritating" contrast to character Mickey Smith (Noel Clarke), the boyfriend of a previous companion; it similarly criticised both as being negative representations of black characters within the series. Graeme Burk, in the book Who Is The Doctor 2: The Unofficial Guide to Doctor Who — The Modern Series, cited Danny as being too controlling of Clara, which made the audience side against him. He also believed that Danny's status as the first major black character since Martha Jones (Freema Agyeman), who had last appeared in the series in 2010, made this characterisation substantially more frustrating. Despite this, Anderson's performance was positively highlighted.

The book Doctor Who - Twelfth Night: Adventures in Time and Space with Peter Capaldi stated that Danny and the Twelfth Doctor's characterisations provided a mirroring between their characters, as while Danny contrasted from the Doctor in how they handled situations, their time as soldiers and their attitude towards it were similar. Danny's characterisation as a soldier was stated by the book Gender and the Quest in British Science Fiction Television: An Analysis of Doctor Who, Blake's 7, Red Dwarf and Torchwood as marginalising his character, as despite his character growth to avoid being a soldier, he was only able to save the world by falling back on his army training, and not for any skills he gained as a teacher. The book Teaching and Learning on Screen: Mediated Pedagogies opined that the Doctor's constant dismissal of Danny's status as a teacher was emblematic of how the Doctor frequently was shown to deride the established education system.
