= Appreciation Index =

Measure of programme approval

The Audience Appreciation Index (AI) is an indicator measured from 0 to 100 of the public's appreciation for a television or radio programme, or broadcast service, in the United Kingdom.

Until 2002, the AI of a programme was calculated by the Broadcasters' Audience Research Board (BARB), the organisation that compiles television ratings for the major broadcasters and advertisers in the UK. Currently the AI is produced as part of an online Television Appreciation Survey, on behalf of the BBC Audience Research Unit, by GfK NOP.

As the individual ratings that produce the AI of a programme are recorded online the day after broadcast, the resulting score is usually available two days after broadcast, though these scores are not generally made public by the BBC. The AI is considered especially useful for assessing the level of appreciation by viewers for programmes made for small or specialist audiences. If a television programme has performed only passably in the ratings, yet achieves a high AI, it can help to determine whether the programme should be recommissioned.

On average, programmes aired on the BBC's four main television channels (BBC One, BBC Two, BBC Three and BBC Four) for the period April–June 2013 received an AI rating of 82.3 and radio programmes received an AI rating of 79.9. The average AI for a drama programme on UK television channels BBC One and ITV1 was reported, in 2009, to be 84. Programmes with specialist appeal will often score higher ratings. Internal guidance to BBC production staff is that an AI of 85 or over is to be considered excellent, over 90 is exceptional, 60 or less is poor, and less than 55 is very poor. Sometimes a programme will not garner an AI, as the response for that programme may have been too small. Nor is the AI a conclusive measure; while it is valuable for comparisons within a particular programme category, comparisons between the AIs of different programme types (e.g. dramas with quiz shows) carry no weight.

AI scores in the 90s are less common, though this is less the case for niche, targeted programming that attracts a limited number of viewers, such US imports on smaller channels (such as Sky1), or for specialist programmes, or some very popular dramas. The highest recorded score until the end of 2009 was 97 for a US import on Sky1. Scores lower than 30 are very rare, though some party political broadcasts have received AI scores in the 20s. One criticism of the more general value of AI scores is that audiences tend to watch those shows they like, or expect to like, and so will tend to score them well.

== History ==
In 1936, the BBC began conducting surveys of its radio and television audiences. The intention was not to count the number of listeners or viewers, but to gauge opinion on the programmes themselves. The BBC used volunteers, who kept diaries of their listening and viewing habits, submitting them to the corporation periodically. From these, the first Appreciation Indexes were calculated and privately made known to the programme-makers.

A flaw in the method became apparent when programmes with low audience numbers were left with a small, yet loyal, core of fans. These would give the programme an inflated AI. When commercial television launched in Britain in 1955, advertisers were less concerned about attitudes to programmes than they were about viewing figures, and this marked the start of the frequent measurement of audience totals. With the establishment of commercial television, individual broadcasters began to gather their own ratings data, as well as viewer opinion in the form of the AI, until 1981, when the major industry players set up the Broadcasters' Audience Research Board (BARB) to compile this information. In 2002, BARB ceased to compile AI data; currently the BBC commissions its own research.

== Method ==
Under BARB, viewing diaries were sent to 2,000 people on a panel made up of members of the public each week, with a further four panels consisting of 1,000 people each receiving diaries every four weeks.

Since 2005 the panel has been recruited and administered online by GfK NOP, for the BBC Audience Research Unit as a daily survey called Pulse, a panel of around 20,000 people (16+) who are invited to complete a survey every day to say what they have watched and listened to, and what they thought of each programme. Pulse measures a wide range of BBC and competitor stations. The daily reporting panel is weighted for age, social grade, sex, presence of children, region and the household digital type on a daily basis to ensure it is representative of the UK as a whole. The main Pulse measure, the AI or Appreciation Index, is obtained by respondents being asked to mark out of 10 each of the programmes they watched or listened to the previous day, where 10 is the highest score and 1 the lowest. The average of all these marks out of 10 for a programme is then multiplied by 10 to give an Appreciation score (AI). For example, when aggregating scores for all programmes together for BBC TV (as of March 2011), the average score is 8.2, which gives an AI of 82.

The panel enables the BBC to collect over 5,000 responses a day on TV and radio programmes. Panelists are encouraged, by means of a prize draw reward scheme, to log in at least ten times in any one month.

At this time only a limited number of TV channels are covered by this rating system, and only broadcasts watched live, or in recorded form the same day, are given AI scores. More extensive surveys, covering more channels and including programmes recorded for viewing within a week of broadcast, are occasionally carried out by smaller panels.

Additional measures include ratings for the quality and distinctiveness of the programmes. There are a selection of other questions that form part of the survey – some that are always asked, and some that may be asked depending on the programme. An example of the former is to note how much of each programme was watched, using a scale of 1–10, where '10' means that the viewer watched it all, and '1' means that they watched very little. Also of key importance to the BBC is to find out whether the viewers considered a programme to be of 'high quality'. An example of the latter would be a question designed to gauge whether the viewer 'learned something new'. Viewers are also asked to rate how much effort they took to view the programme—whether they made a special effort, just some effort, or watched it because it was on.

An extensive study undertaken by the BBC into how people score programmes and what variables help to make up an AI score found that one of the leading factors in determining an AI score was whether a programme was deemed to be "high quality". Other factors such as the amount of effort people take to view the programme or whether viewers found it entertaining were also important.

The study found that scores can be affected in different ways for different types of programme. The score for a sport programme can depend on which team a panellist supports and who won or lost. Scores for a programme can vary according to how long a show has been running, so a new comedy will typically start with a lower average score and then increase over time as viewers become accustomed to the characters and settings.

The study found that changes in the TV market, such as the expanded choice offered by digital TV, the introduction of HD and the increased use of PVRs and catch up services such as BBC iPlayer, have helped to increase the quality of the TV watching experience, and this in turn has improved average AI scores. People typically give programmes they have recorded, or have viewed in HD, a higher score than the same programme watched live or in standard definition. BBC HD has a higher average AI (85 – as of March 2011) than any other BBC channel.

== See also ==
- Broadcasters' Audience Research Board
- Audience measurement
- Nielsen ratings
