= Doctor Who series 9 =

2015 season of British sci-fi TV series

Doctor Who
- Series 9
- DVD box set cover art
- Showrunner: Steven Moffat
- Starring: Peter Capaldi; Jenna Coleman
- No. of stories: 9
- No. of episodes: 12 (+2 specials)

Release
- Original network: BBC One
- Original release: 19 September – 5 December 2015

Series chronology
- ← Previous; Series 8 Next → Series 10

The ninth series of the British science fiction television programme Doctor Who premiered on 19 September 2015 with "The Magician's Apprentice" and concluded on 5 December 2015 with "Hell Bent". The series was led by head writer and executive producer Steven Moffat, alongside executive producer Brian Minchin. Nikki Wilson, Peter Bennett, and Derek Ritchie served as producers. The series is the ninth to air following the programme's revival in 2005, and is the thirty-fifth season overall.

This is the second series starring Peter Capaldi as the Twelfth Doctor, an alien Time Lord who travels through time and space in his TARDIS, which is disguised as a British police box. It also stars Jenna Coleman as the Doctor's companion, Clara Oswald, for her third and final series in the role. Also playing a major recurring role in the series is Maisie Williams as Ashildr, a Viking girl made immortal by the Doctor, which leads to major events resulting from her encounters with the Doctor. The series' main story arc revolves around the mystery of a being called the Hybrid, the combination of two great warrior races. The Doctor's investigation into this being ultimately leads him back to his home planet of Gallifrey, which returns fully in the series.

Steven Moffat wrote four episodes solo and co-wrote an additional two. The other writers who worked on this series included Toby Whithouse, Jamie Mathieson, Catherine Tregenna, Peter Harness, Mark Gatiss, and Sarah Dollard. The ninth series received acclaim from critics.

== Episodes ==
The series contains more than one two-part story for the first time since the sixth series in 2011. Episodes such as "The Girl Who Died" / "The Woman Who Lived" and "Face the Raven" / "Heaven Sent" / "Hell Bent" are connected through loose story arcs, but are considered separate when it comes to their respective story numbers.

No. story	No. in series	Title	Directed by	Written by	Original release date	UK viewers (millions)	AI
Special (2014)
253	–	"Last Christmas"	Paul Wilmshurst	Steven Moffat	25 December 2014	8.28	82
Clara discovers Santa Claus on her rooftop. The Twelfth Doctor arrives and takes her away in the TARDIS. At the North Pole, a group of scientists work on trying to save their fellow base personnel who have been taken over by Dream Crabs, alien crabs that induce a dream state while devouring a person's brain. The Doctor and Clara arrive at the base and come under attack from the crabs, only to be rescued by Santa. Clara is slowly devoured by a crab. The Doctor enters Clara's dream with another crab to wake her. Clara and the Doctor wake up, which kills the crabs devouring them. The Doctor realises everyone is in a multi-layered dream, with Santa being part of it. They escape when they dream that Santa is flying them home. One by one they wake up until only Clara is left. The Doctor awakens and removes the crab from Clara, only to discover that Clara is now an elderly woman. Santa appears and the Doctor realises he is still dreaming. Waking up, the Doctor frees Clara, now a young adult, from the crab. He asks Clara if she wants to rejoin him aboard the TARDIS; she accepts.
Series
254a	1	"The Magician's Apprentice"	Hettie MacDonald	Steven Moffat	19 September 2015	6.54	84
The Doctor attempts to rescue a boy on a battlefield, but upon discovering that the boy is a young Davros, abandons him and goes missing. On Earth, Clara is summoned by UNIT when all of the world's aircraft freeze in the sky, and they discover Missy is causing the phenomenon. Missy has the last will and testament of the Doctor, called his confession dial, and tells Clara that they must search for him. They trace him to Essex in 1138, where he has spent three weeks throwing a party. When Clara and Missy reunite with the Doctor, an agent of Davros called Colony Sarff arrives and explains that the elderly Davros wishes to see the Doctor, before taking the three to a hospital space station. Clara and Missy discover the station is a building on an invisible planet, but as the landscape reappears, Missy identifies the planet as Skaro, the home planet of the Daleks. They are captured by the Daleks, who appear to kill them and destroy the TARDIS. The Doctor returns to the battlefield, holding a Dalek weapon, preparing to save his friend.
254b	2	"The Witch's Familiar"	Hettie MacDonald	Steven Moffat	26 September 2015	5.71	83
Using Dalek energy, Missy was able to power her teleporter for her and Clara to escape. The two attempt to find the Doctor, going through the sewers, which are filled with decaying Daleks. They successfully kill a Dalek and empty its case to disguise Clara inside of it. Meanwhile, the Doctor comforts the dying Davros, feeling compassion for him having abandoned him as a boy in the past. The Doctor uses a little regeneration energy to power Davros' life support, which is also connected to every Dalek. This turns out to be a trap, and begins draining the Doctor to regenerate Davros and the Daleks. Missy saves the Doctor, and the energy also restores the dying Daleks, who wish to destroy the functional Daleks. While escaping, the Doctor and Missy encounter Clara's Dalek. Missy tries to trick the Doctor into killing her, but fails after the Dalek asks for mercy. Missy escapes. Using his new sonic sunglasses, the Doctor summons the TARDIS, which also had avoided destruction by its automated systems. The Doctor then returns to the battlefield, where he does not kill Davros, but destroys the mines to free him, and then helps him home.
255a	3	"Under the Lake"	Daniel O'Hara	Toby Whithouse	3 October 2015	5.63	84
The Doctor and Clara arrive in an underwater base in 2119. The military team there have discovered an alien craft in the ruins of a submerged Scottish town with glyphs scratched in its inside walls, but Commander Moran was killed upon its discovery. At night, the ghosts of Moran and a Tivolian appear. The Doctor and the others attempt to capture the ghosts and understand what they want, and find out that they are repeating coordinates. They find an unopenable stasis chamber at the church where the coordinates led. The Doctor concludes that the ghosts are being used to send a call to the location. The Doctor decides to go back to before the flood and find out the true meaning behind the signal. Clara, acting commander Cass, and crewmember Lunn are separated from the Doctor and crewmembers O'Donnell and Bennett. Shortly after the Doctor, O'Donnell, and Bennett leave in the TARDIS, Clara spots a new ghost in the lake, only to discover that it is the Doctor.
255b	4	"Before the Flood"	Daniel O'Hara	Toby Whithouse	10 October 2015	6.05	83
The Doctor, Bennett, and O'Donnell land in 1980. They discover that the Tivolian, Prentis, is still alive, the writing has not yet been scratched into the wall, and Prentis landed on Earth to bury his former enslaver the Fisher King. The Doctor contacts Clara in 2119, who tells him the Doctor's ghost is mouthing their names. The ghost releases the others from the Faraday cage. In 1980, the Fisher King awakes, killing Prentis and writing the glyphs on the wall. O'Donnell is killed, confirming the suspicion that the Doctor's ghost is saying the order in which they will die. Attempting to save Clara, the Doctor confronts the Fisher King. He tells the Doctor the ghosts created by the glyphs will send a signal that will draw an armada. The Fisher King is drawn away from the chamber, and the Doctor destroys the dam wall, flooding the town. The stasis chamber opens in 2119 to reveal the Doctor inside; his "ghost" is a hologram, programmed by the Doctor. The hologram lures the ghosts back inside the Faraday cage. The plot is a bootstrap paradox—the Doctor programmed the ghost to say the names because that is what the ghost's message said.
256	5	"The Girl Who Died"	Ed Bazalgette	Jamie Mathieson and Steven Moffat	17 October 2015	6.56	82
After being captured by Vikings, the Doctor and Clara are brought to their village. A race of conquerors called the Mire kill the village's warriors and drain them of their testosterone and adrenaline. The Doctor and Clara begin training the villagers for battle after a woman from the village called Ashildr declares war on the Mire. The next day, the Mire invade, and the Doctor steals a helmet for Ashildr to use. She broadcasts a vision of a dragon into the Mire's other helmets and forces them to retreat, but she dies from the use of her helmet. The Doctor and Clara mourn, but then the Doctor realises his face (Note: The Twelfth Doctor's face is the same as Caecilius, a sculptor from Pompeii whose life is saved by the Tenth Doctor in the 2008 episode "The Fires of Pompeii". Both characters were portrayed by Peter Capaldi.) is a reminder that he does not have to follow the rules of time and space. He uses a Mire medical chip to bring Ashildr back to life, essentially making her immortal. He provides the second chip in hope she would give it to one she cares for.
257	6	"The Woman Who Lived"	Ed Bazalgette	Catherine Tregenna	24 October 2015	6.11	81
The Doctor is alone and on the trail of an alien artefact in 1651 England. He interrupts Ashildr, now calling herself "Me", attempting to rob Lucie Fanshawe. Throughout her immortal life, she has lost many memories, and now isolates herself as to not lose loved ones. Me and the Doctor steal the artefact from Lucie's house. The Doctor meets Me's ally Leandro, a leonine alien stranded on Earth who uses the artefact to open portals into space. In return for Me tricking the Doctor into helping him, Leandro has agreed to let her come with him to travel the galaxy. However, in order for the portal to be activated, the artefact requires another person's death. Me kills the outlaw Sam Swift, opening the portal. Leandro reveals that his intent is to assist his people in invading Earth. When Me rediscovers her humanity after seeing spaceships attack the crowd, she uses the medical chip to save Swift, closing the portal. Leandro's people kill him for his failure. Afterwards, Me says that she will look after those that the Doctor leaves behind.
258a	7	"The Zygon Invasion"	Daniel Nettheim	Peter Harness	31 October 2015	5.76	82
A peace treaty has allowed 20 million Zygons to remain on Earth, peacefully living out as disguised humans. Two versions of the scientist Osgood, a human and a Zygon duplicate, kept the peace until one of them died and the other disappeared. The Doctor leaves the Osgoods the Osgood Box to be used as a last resort. In New Mexico, a Zygon splinter group kidnaps Osgood. In London, a splinter group member called Bonnie takes over Zygon High Command. At the block of flats where Clara lives, Clara is knocked unconscious and hidden in a pod underground. Bonnie takes Clara's place. Bonnie tricks UNIT troops into going to a series of underground tunnels, which many other lifts across the city are connected to. The troops are killed by the splinter group when they attempt to escape. Kate Stewart is attacked by a splinter group member disguised as a sheriff while investigating Osgood in New Mexico. The Doctor rescues Osgood from captivity in Turmezistan and the two set off back to London. A Zygon captured and taken on board the plane tells the Doctor the invasion has already taken place. Bonnie fires a missile at their plane.
258b	8	"The Zygon Inversion"	Daniel Nettheim	Peter Harness and Steven Moffat	7 November 2015	6.03	84
The Doctor and Osgood escape the plane before it is shot down. Within Clara's mind, Bonnie learns that the Osgood Box is held in UNIT's Black Archive. Against the wishes of the Zygons who are not aligned with the splinter group, Bonnie intends to start a war against humanity by using the Osgood Box to unmask 20 million Zygons on Earth. Clara telepathically breaks through Bonnie's control and alerts the Doctor to her whereabouts. Kate, having survived the encounter in New Mexico, joins the Doctor and Osgood. The three arrive at the Black Archive where Bonnie has found there are two Osgood Boxes, one which would either unmask the Zygons or make their human forms permanent, and the other which would destroy either every Zygon or everyone in London. When Bonnie and Kate prepare to activate the boxes, the Doctor talks them out by explaining the Boxes are a means to assure peace because of the consequences of declaring a war. Bonnie realises the boxes are empty as a ploy. The Doctor wipes Kate's memories to keep the peace treaty. Bonnie calls off the splinter group and says they will live peacefully. Bonnie becomes the new Osgood duplicate.
259	9	"Sleep No More"	Justin Molotnikov	Mark Gatiss	14 November 2015	5.61	78
A four-person rescue team from Triton arrives at Le Verrier Lab, a space station in the 38th century in orbit around Neptune which has fallen silent. They meet the Doctor and Clara, who claim to be assessors. They then meet Gagan Rassmussen, the last survivor of Le Verrier and creator of large pods called Morpheus, which reduces the time a person sleeps to allow them to work more but also mutates the rheum in the corner of the eye into a carnivorous life form called the Sandmen. Chopra, Deep-Ando, and 474 are killed during their escape. Rassmussen plans to use the rescue ship to return to Triton and release Morpheus there with a Sandman, which he says is now spread by spores. The Doctor destroys the gravity shields, sending the station and ship into Neptune. The Doctor comments that the inconsistencies in how Morpheus is spread seems to be contrived like a story. The Doctor, Clara, and Nagata escape in the TARDIS. Rassmussen, revealed to be a Sandman himself, orchestrated the events to use footage collated from people's vision to create a video that people would watch to transmit the Morpheus signal across the Solar System to create more Sandmen.
260	10	"Face the Raven"	Justin Molotnikov	Sarah Dollard	21 November 2015	6.05	84
The Doctor and Clara receive a phone call from their friend Rigsy, who informs them that a tattoo with numbers counting down has appeared on the back of his neck; and he didn't put it there. After examining him, they trace his movements to a trap street in present-day London that houses extraterrestrial refugees. They then discover Rigsy was sentenced to death by Me, (Note: In "Face the Raven" and "Hell Bent", the immortal Viking woman is credited as her original name Ashildr.) the street's mayor, for murdering an alien called Anah and that Rigsy will be killed by an alien raven when the tattoo, known as a Chronolock, reaches zero. Clara discovers that the Chronolock can be transferred to a willing recipient and takes it from Rigsy, believing that Me will spare her, buying them more time. The Doctor realises from the medical data in the stasis pod Anah is stored inside that Anah is still alive; Me made a deal with an unknown party to have the Doctor transported far away to keep the street safe. As the Chronolock has been passed on to Clara, Me cannot remove it and Clara cannot be saved. Clara pleads with the Doctor not to take revenge for her. The raven kills Clara, and the Doctor is teleported away.
261	11	"Heaven Sent"	Rachel Talalay	Steven Moffat	28 November 2015	6.19	80
The Doctor teleports into a chamber in a castle. He is followed by a creature which intends to torture him, but discovers that after giving a confession of some kind, the creature will temporarily retreat and the castle will shift its form. The Doctor seeks to escape, and investigates clues that direct him to a particular room, in which he finds a wall made of Azbantium, a mineral harder than diamond. He determines that he has already been in the castle for 7000 years. Understanding what this and other clues imply, he tries in vain to break the wall with his fist, but the creature appears and mortally wounds him. He crawls back to the room he appeared in, and sacrifices himself just as the configuration of the castle resets, rematerializing a copy of himself exactly as he originally teleported in. By exactly repeating this entire cycle of events innumerable times, (Note: According to the following episode "Hell Bent", the Doctor's imprisonment lasted four and a half billion years.) the Azbantium wall is eventually weakened and he breaks through. Stepping through the breach, the Doctor sees he was inside his confession dial all along, and is now on Gallifrey, eons from now. He tells a nearby child to go to the city and inform the Time Lords he is on his way and that he knows what they did.
262	12	"Hell Bent"	Rachel Talalay	Steven Moffat	5 December 2015	6.17	82
Aided by the Gallifreyan military, the Doctor usurps and exiles Lord President Rassilon. Now the new President, the Doctor learns that Rassilon imprisoned him in the dial to force him to confess about the Hybrid, which is prophesied by the Time Lords to stand in Gallifrey's ruins and unravel the Web of Time. The Doctor has the Time Lords retrieve Clara from her timeline at the instant of her death, ostensibly so the Doctor can consult her about the Hybrid. The Doctor escapes Gallifrey with Clara with a TARDIS stolen from the workshops under the Capitol, attempting to take her far away enough that she will return to life, despite this potentially damaging time. At the end of the universe, the Doctor encounters Ashildr in Gallifrey's ruins; the two conclude the Hybrid is the Doctor and Clara together. The Doctor decides to remove Clara's memories of him to prevent the Time Lords from finding her, but Clara alters the device so it will affect the Doctor. The Doctor wakes in the Nevada desert where his own TARDIS has been moved. Clara, travelling with Ashildr, begins her trip to Gallifrey in the TARDIS stolen from Gallifrey to return to her death.
Special (2015)
263	–	"The Husbands of River Song"	Douglas Mackinnon	Steven Moffat	25 December 2015	7.69	82
The Doctor is on the planet Mendorax Dellora in 5343, where due to a case of mistaken identity he is recruited by his former companion and wife River Song to assist her in removing a diamond from the head of King Hydroflax after his maligned attempt to steal it. Surprised that River cannot identify his newest face, the Doctor struggles to break the news to her while learning how she acts on her own – and how many other lovers she has had. The Doctor and River bring the head of Hydroflax to the starship Harmony and Redemption to sell it, and a series of events causes River to discover the Doctor's identity. The starship is caught in a meteor strike and crashes into the planet Darillium, where the Doctor and River are fated to have their final date together before River dies meeting a younger Doctor. Having deliberately held it off for as long as possible, the Doctor finally decides to give in and arranges for a restaurant to be constructed on the planet. The Doctor and River then have their final date together, which lasts for 24 years – the span of a night on Darillium.

=== Prequels ===
The following were both prequels to "The Magician's Apprentice".

Title	Directed by	Written by	Original release date	Length
Prologue	Hettie MacDonald	Steven Moffat	11 September 2015	1:55
A prologue that leads into the first episode of the series, "The Magician's Apprentice". It features a scene between the Doctor and the leader of the Sisterhood of Karn, Ohila. They discuss a very old enemy summoning the Doctor, to which he replies he will not go. However, Ohila knows he is lying.
"The Doctor's Meditation"	Ed Bazalgette	Steven Moffat	15 September 2015	6:36
The Doctor appears in medieval times alongside Bors, who appears to be a loyal friend, and Bors questions who he must face, asking whether he faces an old friend or a foe. The Doctor replies that he must meditate, but has trouble doing so. Finally, he does meditate, but only after Bors promises to stay by his side. During the short the Doctor builds a well and a visitors' centre. The prequel was shown in cinemas in Russia, Ukraine, Canada, Denmark and the United States alongside the 3D showing of the series 8 finale, "Dark Water" / "Death in Heaven". It was made available through the official Doctor Who Facebook page, and other online sources such Amazon Instant Video and iTunes.

== Casting ==
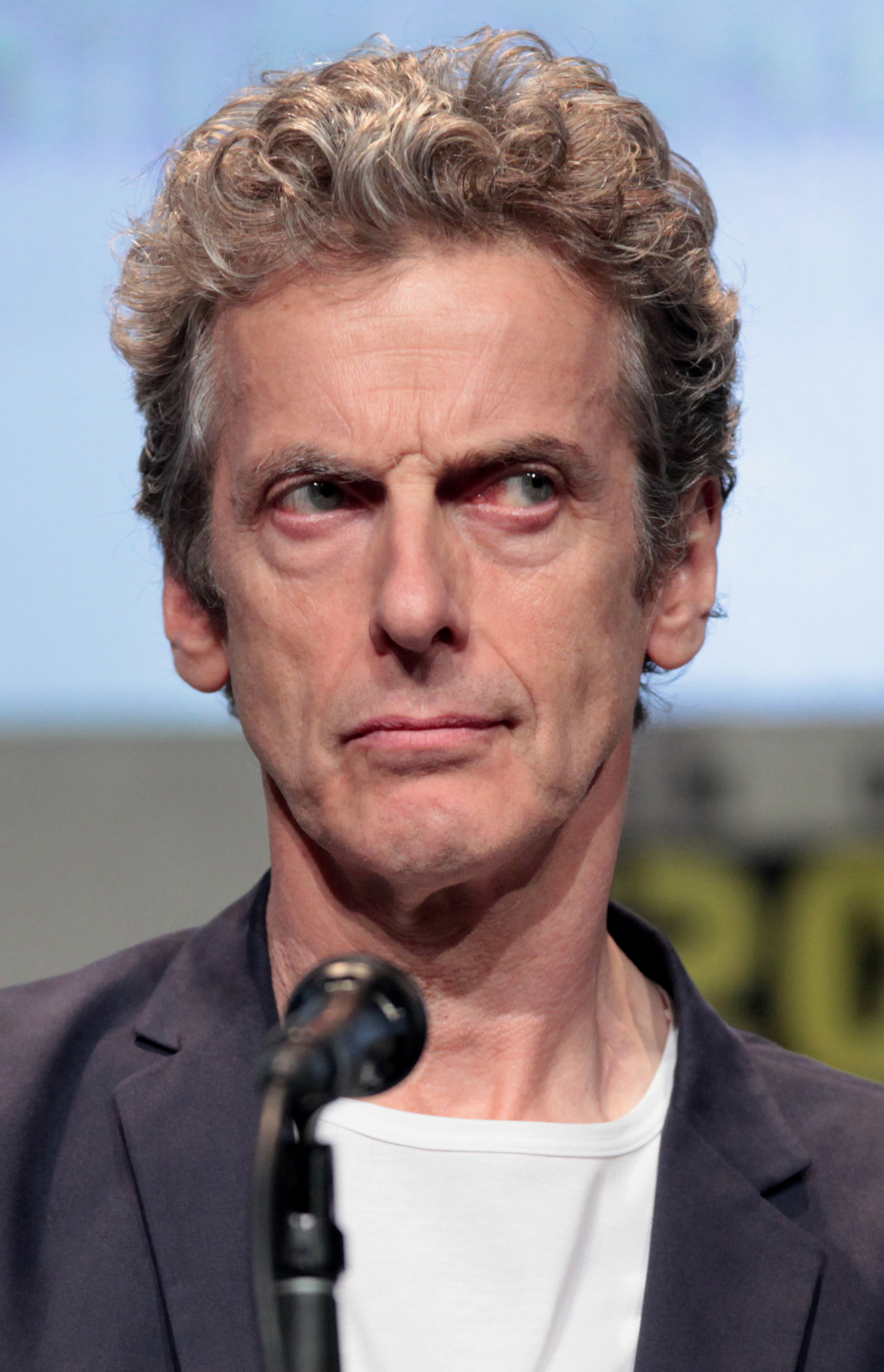
Capaldi at the 2015 San Diego Comic-Con, where he promoted his second full series.

In Doctor Who Magazine, Michelle Gomez confirmed that she would return as Missy, the latest incarnation of the Master, who served as the main villain in series 8. In February 2015, it was confirmed that Missy would return in "The Magician's Apprentice" / "The Witch's Familiar", the opening episodes of the series.

In January 2015, it was announced that actor Paul Kaye had a guest role in the first production block. It was later announced that other guest actors featuring in the first block would include Arsher Ali, Morven Christie, Neil Fingleton, Colin McFarlane, and Steven Robertson.

Jemma Redgrave returned in the recurring role of Kate Stewart. Kelly Hunter was also confirmed to be appearing in the opening story, alongside Jaye Griffiths and Clare Higgins. Hunter previously appeared as the Shadow Architect for the Shadow Proclamation in "The Stolen Earth", while Higgins appeared in "The Night of the Doctor" as Ohila, High Priestess of the Sisterhood of Karn. It was announced on 8 May 2015 that Ingrid Oliver would return as Osgood alongside Redgrave for "The Zygon Invasion" / "The Zygon Inversion", a story involving the Zygons, despite her apparent death in the previous series.

On 5 August 2015, it was announced that Reece Shearsmith, Elaine Tan, Neet Mohan, Bethany Black and Paul Courtenay Hyu would have a role in "Sleep No More".

Other guests included India Ria Amarteifio, Dasharn Anderson, Harki Bhambra, Daniel Hoffmann-Gill, Aaron Neil, Demi Papaminas, Joey Price and Jami Reid-Quarrell. On 30 March 2015, Maisie Williams, Rufus Hound, Tom Stourton, Ariyon Bakare, Simon Lipkin, Ian Conningham, Murray McArthur, Barnaby Kay, John Voce, and Struan Rodger were announced to be appearing. On 19 April 2015, David Schofield was announced to be playing Viking god Odin. On 4 June 2015, it was announced that Rebecca Front, who starred alongside Capaldi in The Thick of It, would appear in "The Zygon Invasion". On 10 June 2015, it was announced that Joivan Wade would return as Rigsy, who previously appeared in "Flatline". Robin Soans played Chronolock Guy in "Face the Raven"; Soans previously appeared in Doctor Who as Luvic in The Keeper of Traken. Letitia Wright and Naomi Ackie also appeared in "Face the Raven".

Julian Bleach reprised his role as Davros, having last appeared in the role in 2008's "The Stolen Earth" / "Journey's End", while Joey Price played a younger version of the character. On 28 September 2015, it was announced that Corey Taylor, frontman for the heavy metal band Slipknot, would feature in the fourth episode "Before the Flood", as the scream of the alien warlord Fisher King, whose voice was provided by Peter Serafinowicz and whose body was portrayed by Neil Fingleton.

== Production ==
=== Development ===
Before series 8 began, Moffat promised a cliffhanger for series 9, and teased in Doctor Who Magazine Issue 475, "I've figured out the cliffhanger to the penultimate episode of series 9. And it's a whopper. Ohh, I don't think you'll see this coming!" The series saw the return of the cliffhanger, with six of the twelve episodes divided into two-parters. Moffat has stated that the two-part stories are not as connected as similar stories in previous series, but instead are quite different and only vaguely related. In April 2015, Steven Moffat confirmed that Doctor Who would run for at least another five years, extending the show until at least 2020.

As the series coincides with the 10th anniversary of the show's revival, the BBC asked former showrunner and head writer Russell T. Davies to return, but he declined. A BBC source said that plans for the revival anniversary were still to be decided, despite Davies' reluctance to return. He also believed that the success of the revived show meant that "It's now impossible for it to ever be axed." However, despite the comments made to Radio Times, in an interview with BBC Radio 2 a week later, Davies said he would love to write more Doctor Who, specifically a movie.

=== Writing ===
Steven Moffat wrote the opening two-parter story, and Catherine Tregenna wrote an episode for the series. Tregenna had previously been involved in Doctor Who spin-off series Torchwood.

In January 2015, the Doctor Who Twitter page reported that filming had begun on episodes written by Toby Whithouse, who had previously contributed episodes "School Reunion", "The Vampires of Venice", "The God Complex" and "A Town Called Mercy". On 16 March 2015, Mark Gatiss confirmed he would be writing an episode for the series. On 30 March 2015, it was confirmed Jamie Mathieson, who previously wrote "Mummy on the Orient Express" and "Flatline" for series 8, would write a new episode called "The Girl Who Died" with Moffat. On 8 May 2015 it was announced that Peter Harness, who wrote series 8's "Kill the Moon", would write a two-part story. Justin Molotnikov was to direct two 60 minute episodes for Doctor Who, according to his CV, though this was removed at a later date. However, he directed the ninth and tenth episodes of the series.

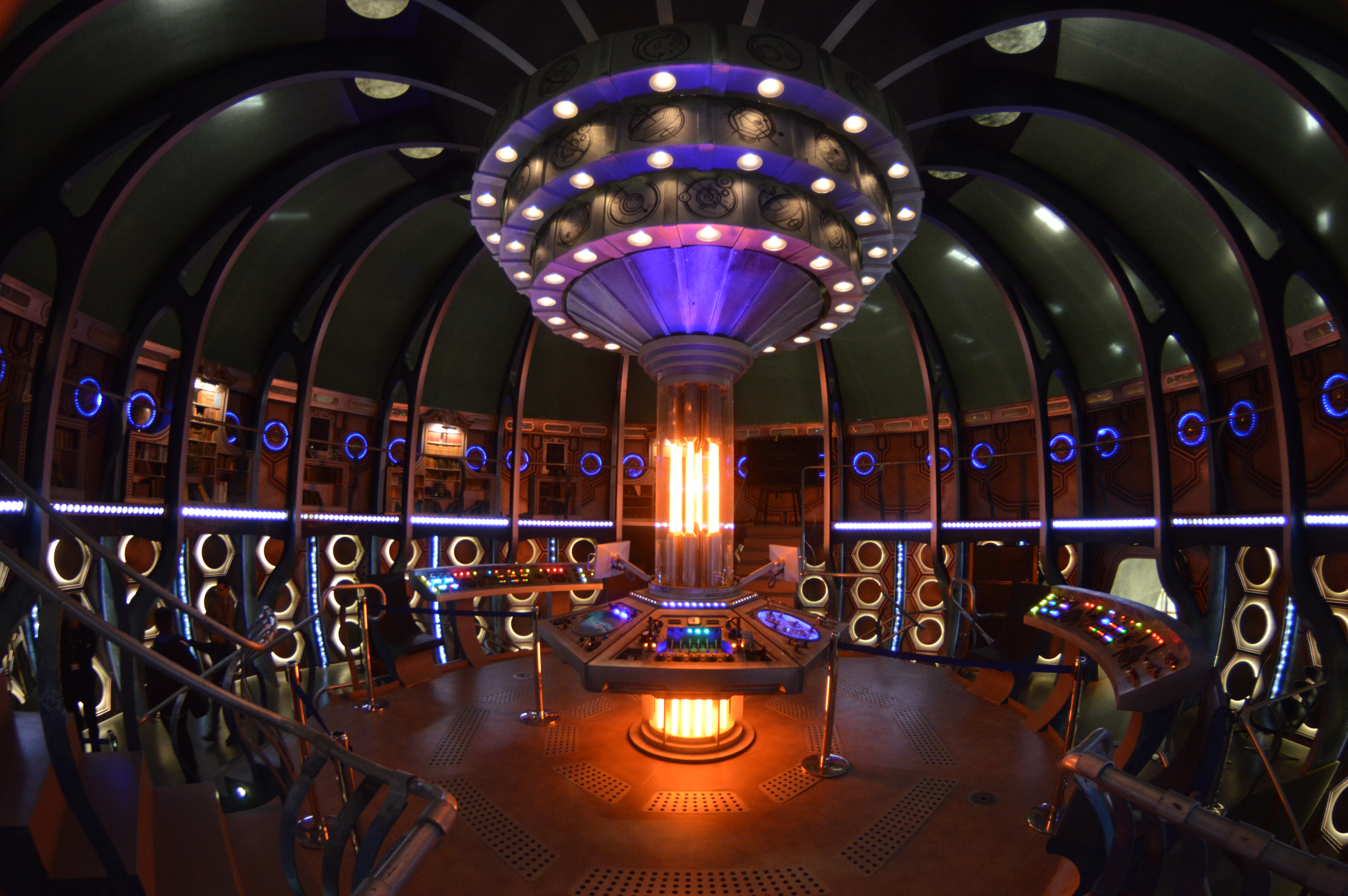
The modified TARDIS set that debuted in Series 9

=== Music ===
Murray Gold composed the soundtrack to this series, with orchestration by Ben Foster.

=== Filming ===
Filming and principal photography for the ninth series began on 5 January 2015 in Cardiff, with "Under the Lake" and "Before the Flood" making up the first production block. The read-through for the first block took place on 18 December 2014. The second production block consisted of two of Steven Moffat's episodes, the opening two-parter. Filming for the story took place in Tenerife, Spain, in February 2015, directed by Hettie MacDonald, who directed the 2007 episode "Blink".

On 30 March 2015, it was announced that Ed Bazalgette would direct two episodes, one written by Jamie Mathieson and Steven Moffat and the other by Catherine Tregenna. On 8 May 2015, the BBC announced that filming had started on a two-part episode written by Peter Harness and directed by Daniel Nettheim. On 10 June 2015, it was revealed by the BBC that filming for Block 5 had begun with Justin Molotnikov directing "Face the Raven", written by Sarah Dollard. On 1 July 2015, the BBC confirmed that Rachel Talalay would return to direct the final two episodes of the series, both written by Steven Moffat.

Production blocks were arranged as follows:

Block	Episode(s)	Director	Writer(s)	Producer
X	Christmas special: "Last Christmas"	Paul Wilmshurst	Steven Moffat	Paul Frift
1	Episode 3: "Under the Lake"	Daniel O'Hara	Toby Whithouse	Derek Ritchie
1	Episode 4: "Before the Flood"	Daniel O'Hara	Toby Whithouse	Derek Ritchie
2	Episode 1: "The Magician's Apprentice"	Hettie MacDonald	Steven Moffat	Peter Bennett
2	Episode 2: "The Witch's Familiar"	Hettie MacDonald	Steven Moffat	Peter Bennett
3	Episode 5: "The Girl Who Died"	Ed Bazalgette	Jamie Mathieson and Steven Moffat	Derek Ritchie
3	Episode 6: "The Woman Who Lived"	Ed Bazalgette	Catherine Tregenna	Derek Ritchie
4	Episode 7: "The Zygon Invasion"	Daniel Nettheim	Peter Harness	Peter Bennett
4	Episode 8: "The Zygon Inversion"	Daniel Nettheim	Peter Harness and Steven Moffat	Peter Bennett
5	Episode 10: "Face the Raven"	Justin Molotnikov	Sarah Dollard	Nikki Wilson
6	Episode 11: "Heaven Sent"	Rachel Talalay	Steven Moffat	Peter Bennett
7	Episode 9: "Sleep No More"	Justin Molotnikov	Mark Gatiss	Nikki Wilson
8	Episode 12: "Hell Bent"	Rachel Talalay	Steven Moffat	Peter Bennett
X	Christmas special: "The Husbands of River Song"	Douglas Mackinnon	Steven Moffat	Nikki Wilson

== Release ==
=== Promotion ===
On 9 July 2015, the first trailer for the series was released, alongside the confirmation of the airdate of "The Magician's Apprentice". The same day, Capaldi, Coleman, Gomez and Moffat promoted the series at San Diego Comic-Con. On 12 August 2015, the second trailer for the series was released. A prologue to the series was released online on 11 September 2015. A prequel to the series, entitled "The Doctor's Meditation", was released on 15 September 2015 exclusively shown as part of a 3D cinematic release of the previous series' finale.

=== Broadcast ===
At the final 50th anniversary event at the BFI in December 2013, Steven Moffat announced that all future series, including the ninth, would not be split into two parts as had been done since the sixth series. Instead, they would be transmitted continuously, and that this would remain the standard broadcast format.

When filming began in January 2015, the BBC announced that the series would air late in the same year. A cinema screening of "The Magician's Apprentice" was held on 27 August 2015 in Edinburgh as part of The Guardian Edinburgh International Television Festival. It was also screened along with "The Witch's Familiar" on 10 September 2015 in Cardiff by BAFTA Cymru with a Q&A session following.

The twelve-episode ninth series premiered on BBC One on 19 September 2015. The series also premiered on 19 September in the United States on BBC America, and in Canada on Space. A screening for "The Magician's Apprentice" was held in the United States on 17 September at SVA Theatre in New York City. The premiere in Canada was preceded by a marathon of Doctor Who episodes featuring the Master.

New Zealand and Australia premiered the series on 20 September on Prime and ABC TV respectively. Episodes were released in Australia on the ABC iview streaming service initially, as opposed to the eighth series, which was simulcast on ABC TV with broadcasts featuring on ABC1 later the same night.

=== Home media ===
- ^{(D)} indicates a DVD release for a specific date
- ^{(B)} indicates a Blu-ray release
- ^{(D,B)} indicates a simultaneous DVD and Blu-ray release

Series	Story no.	Episode name	Duration	Release date		
Series	Story no.	Episode name	Duration	R2	R4	R1
9	253	Doctor Who: "Last Christmas"	1 × 60 min.	26 January 2015^{(D,B)}	28 January 2015^{(D,B)}	17 February 2015^{(D,B)}
9	254–257	Doctor Who: Series 9, Part 1 "The Magician's Apprentice" – "The Woman Who Lived"	2 × 50 min. 4 × 45 min.	2 November 2015^{(D,B)}	4 November 2015^{(D,B)}	3 November 2015^{(D,B)}
9	258–262	Doctor Who: Series 9, Part 2 "The Zygon Invasion" – "Hell Bent"	1 × 50 min. 1 × 55 min. 1 × 60 min. 3 × 45 min.	4 January 2016^{(D,B)}	13 January 2016^{(D,B)}	26 January 2016^{(D,B)}
9	263	Doctor Who: "The Husbands of River Song"	1 × 60 min.	25 January 2016^{(D,B)}	27 January 2016^{(D,B)}	23 February 2016^{(D,B)}
9	253–263	Doctor Who: The Complete Ninth Series (includes "Last Christmas" and "The Husbands of River Song")	3 × 50 min. 1 × 55 min. 3 × 60 min. 7 × 45 min.	7 March 2016^{(D,B)}	9 March 2016^{(D,B)}	5 April 2016^{(D,B)}
8, 9, 10	242–276	Doctor Who: The Complete Peter Capaldi Years	26 × 45 min. 5 × 50 min. 1 × 55 min. 7 × 60 min. 1 × 76 min.	—N/a	—N/a	13 February 2018^{(B)} 2 October 2018^{(D)}

== In print ==
Series	Story no.	Novelisation title	Author	Original publisher	Paperback release date	Audiobook	
Series	Story no.	Novelisation title	Author	Original publisher	Paperback release date	Release date (Note: Unabridged from BBC Audio / AudioGo unless otherwise indicated)	Narrator
9	256	The Girl Who Died	Jane Rollason	Pearson Education	20 September 2018 (Note: mp3-CD issued by Pearson with paperback of the novelisation)		TBA
9	257	The Woman Who Lived	Chris Rice	Pearson Education	20 September 2018		TBA
9	258	The Zygon Invasion (Note: Also adapts "The Zygon Inversion".)	Peter Harness	BBC Books (Target collection)	13 July 2023	7 September 2023	Dan Starkey
9	260	Face the Raven	Nancy Taylor	Pearson Education	20 September 2018		TBA

== Reception ==
=== Ratings ===
No.	Title	Air date	Overnight ratings		Consolidated ratings		Total viewers (millions)	AI	Ref(s)
No.	Title	Air date	Viewers (millions)	Rank	Viewers (millions)	Rank	Total viewers (millions)	AI	Ref(s)
–	"Last Christmas"	25 December 2014	6.34	7	1.94	7	8.28	82	
1	"The Magician's Apprentice"	19 September 2015	4.58	1	1.96	13	6.54	84	
2	"The Witch's Familiar"	26 September 2015	3.70	5	2.01	24	5.71	83	
3	"Under the Lake"	3 October 2015	3.70	5	1.93	22	5.63	84	
4	"Before the Flood"	10 October 2015	4.38	4	1.67	21	6.05	83	
5	"The Girl Who Died"	17 October 2015	4.85	2	1.71	18	6.56	82	
6	"The Woman Who Lived"	24 October 2015	4.34	3	1.77	25	6.11	81	
7	"The Zygon Invasion"	31 October 2015	3.87	5	1.89	24	5.76	82	
8	"The Zygon Inversion"	7 November 2015	4.13	7	1.9	24	6.03	84	
9	"Sleep No More"	14 November 2015	4.00	6	1.61	28	5.61	78	
10	"Face the Raven"	21 November 2015	4.42	5	1.63	30	6.05	84	
11	"Heaven Sent"	28 November 2015	4.51	6	1.68	27	6.19	80	
12	"Hell Bent"	5 December 2015	4.80	5	1.37	29	6.17	82	
–	"The Husbands of River Song"	25 December 2015	5.77	7	1.92	8	7.69	82	

=== Critical reception ===
Doctor Who's ninth series received positive reviews. Series 9 holds a 90% approval rating on online review aggregate site Rotten Tomatoes with an average score of 8.25/10. The site's consensus reads "Peter Capaldi and the writers have settled into an emotionally engaging tone, allowing the show to raise the stakes for the Twelfth Doctor". Episodes such as "The Woman Who Lived" and "Heaven Sent" received particular acclaim, with critics saying that the former "should be an episode that goes down in Doctor Who history" and "stands as perhaps the strongest entry of Season Thirty-Five thus far", whilst the latter was labelled "a masterpiece of the highest order" and "an instant classic". The lowest-scored episode for the season was the episode written by Mark Gatiss, "Sleep No More", which gained a 61% rating.

In reviews for various episodes across the series, some critics considered it to be one of the strongest since the show's revival in 2005. In their review for "Hell Bent", IGN called series 9 "a very strong season of Doctor Who – possibly the best season of the modern run of the show", while New York Magazine stated "It's been a largely brilliant season... possibly even the best since the new series began" in their review for the same episode. Discussing the series as a whole, The A.V. Club stated "Doctor Who is great again, and this season represents maybe the best mixture yet of the show's head and its heart". Of the twelve episodes in the season, they awarded five a perfect 'A' grade (the most for any season of the show), while awarding a further five episodes either an A− or a B+.

=== Awards and nominations ===
Year	Award	Category	Nominee(s)	Result	Ref(s)
2016	Anglophile Awards	Best Actor in a Television Series	Peter Capaldi	Nominated	
2016	BAFTA Cymru	Technical Achievement Commendation	BBC Cymru, BBC Digital Creativity, Aardman Animations	Nominated	
2016	BAFTA Cymru	Sound & Music Commendation	BBC Cymru, BBC Digital Creativity, Aardman Animations	Nominated	
2016	BAFTA Cymru	Best Editing	Will Oswald	Nominated	
2016	BAFTA Cymru	Best Special and Visual Effects, Titles and Graphic Identity	Doctor Who Production Team for "The Magician's Apprentice"	Won	
2016	BAFTA Scotland	Best Actor	Peter Capaldi	Nominated	
2016	BAFTA TV Awards	Best Supporting Actress	Michelle Gomez	Nominated	
2016	BAFTA TV Awards	Best Visual Effects	Milk VFX, Millennium FX, Real SFX, Molinare	Nominated	
2016	BBC Radio 1 Teen Awards	Best TV Show	Doctor Who	Nominated	
2016	Hugo Awards	Best Dramatic Presentation, Short Form	Steven Moffat and Rachel Talalay for "Heaven Sent"	Nominated	
2016	National Television Awards	Most Popular Drama	Doctor Who	Nominated	
2016	RTS Television Awards	Best Effects – Special	Real SFX & Millennium FX	Nominated	
2016	Saturn Awards	Best Science Fiction Television Series	Doctor Who	Nominated	
2016	Saturn Awards	Best Television Presentation	"The Husbands of River Song"	Won	
2016	Saturn Awards	Best Guest Starring Role on Television	Alex Kingston	Nominated	
2016	TV Choice Awards	Best Family Drama	Doctor Who	Nominated	
2016	TV Choice Awards	Best Actor	Peter Capaldi	Nominated	

== Soundtrack ==
Selected pieces of score from this series, as composed by Murray Gold, were released in a 4-CD set on 27 April 2018 by Silva Screen Records along with music from the 2015 Christmas special "The Husbands of River Song", with the third disc consisting primarily of the score from "Heaven Sent".

Doctor Who: Series 9

Soundtrack album by Murray Gold and the BBC National Orchestra of Wales conducted by Alastair King and Ben Foster
- Released: 27 April 2018
- Recorded: 2015
- Genre: Soundtrack
- Length: 161:53
- Label: Silva Screen Records
- Producers: Murray Gold and Jack Sugden

Doctor Who soundtrack chronology
Doctor Who: Survival (2017)	Doctor Who: Series 9 (2018)	Doctor Who: The Invasion (2018)

Disc 1
No.	Title	Episode	Length
1.	"The One in a Thousand"	"The Magician's Apprentice"	3:22
2.	"Davros Remembers"	"The Magician's Apprentice"	2:40
3.	"Message from Missy"	"The Magician's Apprentice"	2:53
4.	"Meeting in the Square"	"The Magician's Apprentice"	2:08
5.	"Finding The Doctor"	"The Magician's Apprentice"	2:14
6.	"What Have You Done"	"The Magician's Apprentice"	2:49
7.	"Davros Approaches"	"The Witch's Familiar"	3:51
8.	"Some Kind of Submarine"	"Under the Lake"	3:14
9.	"The Ghosts"	"Under the Lake"	2:15
10.	"The Bootstrap Paradox"	"Before the Flood"	1:50
11.	"Finding The Fisher King"	"Before the Flood"	2:35
12.	"Another Ghost Has Appeared"	"Before the Flood"	4:22
13.	"We Need to Get Back to The TARDIS"	"Before the Flood"	0:52
14.	"Directions from The Ghosts"	"Before the Flood"	1:34
15.	"Something in the Spacesuit"	"The Girl Who Died"	1:07
16.	"Two Days on a Longboat"	"The Girl Who Died"	1:16
17.	"I Am Ashildr"	"The Girl Who Died"	1:19
18.	"In a Way, She's a Hybrid"	"The Girl Who Died"	1:28
19.	"I Call Myself Me"	"The Woman Who Lived"	1:09
20.	"They Need Us"	"The Woman Who Lived"	1:52
21.	"The Last Thing We Need"	"The Woman Who Lived"	2:50
Total length:			47:40

Disc 2
No.	Title	Episode	Length
1.	"Deep Cover"	"The Zygon Invasion"	5:11
2.	"Just Come Inside"	"The Zygon Invasion"	2:27
3.	"This Is Not a War"	"The Zygon Inversion"	3:56
4.	"Defending The Earth"	"The Zygon Inversion"	1:11
5.	"The Morpheus Song"	"Sleep No More"	5:25
6.	"Saving Rigsy"	"Face the Raven"	1:28
7.	"Madam Mayor"	"Face the Raven"	1:58
8.	"Running from the Raven"	"Face the Raven"	3:17
9.	"Death Is Locked In"	"Face the Raven"	3:01
10.	"Face the Raven"	"Face the Raven"	7:42
11.	"Back Home"	"Hell Bent"	2:27
12.	"The General's Regeneration"	"Hell Bent"	0:57
13.	"A Duty of Care"	"Hell Bent"	2:25
14.	"Clara's Diner"	"Hell Bent"	1:23
Total length:			42:48

Disc 3
No.	Title	Episode	Length
1.	"A Second Shadow"	"Heaven Sent"	1:27
2.	"The Veil"	"Heaven Sent"	2:46
3.	"A Fly on a Painting"	"Heaven Sent"	5:11
4.	"A Change of Clothes"	"Heaven Sent"	1:46
5.	"A Mechanical Maze"	"Heaven Sent"	2:41
6.	"Digging a Grave"	"Heaven Sent"	3:42
7.	"Tell No Lies"	"Heaven Sent"	4:47
8.	"Two Events in Life"	"Heaven Sent"	3:13
9.	"Waiting for the Veil"	"Heaven Sent"	2:27
10.	"The Final Room"	"Heaven Sent"	1:21
11.	"One Confession Away"	"Heaven Sent"	1:50
12.	"Break Free"	"Heaven Sent"	3:04
13.	"Same Old Day"	"Heaven Sent"	3:13
14.	"The Shepherd's Boy"	"Heaven Sent"	4:48
Total length:			42:16

Disc 4
No.	Title	Episode	Length
1.	"Carol Singers will be Criticised"	"The Husbands of River Song"	1:06
2.	"A Dying Husband"	"The Husbands of River Song"	1:43
3.	"The Finest Surgeon in The Galaxy"	"The Husbands of River Song"	1:17
4.	"The Halassi Androvar"	"The Husbands of River Song"	1:30
5.	"The Husbands of River Song"	"The Husbands of River Song"	2:34
6.	"The TARDIS Can't Take Off"	"The Husbands of River Song"	1:20
7.	"Time to Do It Properly"	"The Husbands of River Song"	0:52
8.	"Harmony and Redemption"	"The Husbands of River Song"	1:25
9.	"Hydroflax in The TARDIS"	"The Husbands of River Song"	1:07
10.	"Whole Again at Last"	"The Husbands of River Song"	1:35
11.	"All the Firewalls in The Galaxy"	"The Husbands of River Song"	2:14
12.	"A Restaurant with a View"	"The Husbands of River Song"	4:23
13.	"The Woman He Loves"	"The Husbands of River Song"	3:15
14.	"The Singing Towers"	"The Husbands of River Song"	4:48
Total length:			29:09
