= Sleep No More (Doctor Who) =

259 – "Sleep No More"
- Doctor Who episode
- The episode uses found footage, with Rassmussen (Reece Shearsmith) narrating.

Cast
- Doctor: Peter Capaldi – Twelfth Doctor
- Companion: Jenna Coleman – Clara Oswald
- Others: Reece Shearsmith – Rassmussen; Elaine Tan – Nagata; Neet Mohan – Chopra; Bethany Black – 474; Paul Courtenay Hyu – Deep-Ando; Paul Davis – King Sandman; Tom Wilton, Matthew Doman – Sandmen; Zina Badran – Morpheus Presenter; Natasha Patel, Elizabeth Chong, Nikkita Chadha, Gracie Lai – Hologram Singers; Nikki Wilson – Voice of the computer (uncredited)

Production
- Directed by: Justin Molotnikov
- Written by: Mark Gatiss
- Produced by: Nikki Wilson
- Executive producers: Steven Moffat; Brian Minchin
- Music by: Murray Gold
- Series: Series 9
- Running time: 45 minutes
- First broadcast: 14 November 2015

Chronology
← Preceded by "The Zygon Inversion"	Followed by → "Face the Raven"

"Sleep No More" is the ninth episode of the ninth series of the British science fiction television series Doctor Who. It was first broadcast on BBC One on 14 November 2015. It marked the first time an episode of the series had not featured any opening titles - the title and writer were instead announced at the beginning of the end credits.

The episode is a found footage video engineered and narrated by Gagan Rassmussen (Reece Shearsmith), a crew member of a space station orbiting Neptune in the 38th century. In the episode, Rassmussen manufactures a perilous adventure involving Sandmen - humanoid creatures made of rheum - to make more people watch the video and allowing the spread of an electronic signal to other people's brains that will create more Sandmen.

== Plot ==
The viewer is addressed by Gagan Rassmussen, a researcher aboard Le Verrier Lab - a space station in orbit around Neptune in the 38th century - through a glitch-filled video transmitted across the Solar System. Rassmussen warns the viewer not to watch the video, but says its found footage will explain the events that have occurred.

When communication with Le Verrier is lost, a rescue ship is dispatched from Triton. Aboard Le Verrier, the four soldiers, Nagata, Chopra, Deep-Ando, and 474, discover the station empty save for the Twelfth Doctor and Clara; passing themselves off as assessors. The group is chased by "Sandmen", humanoid forms composed of dust.

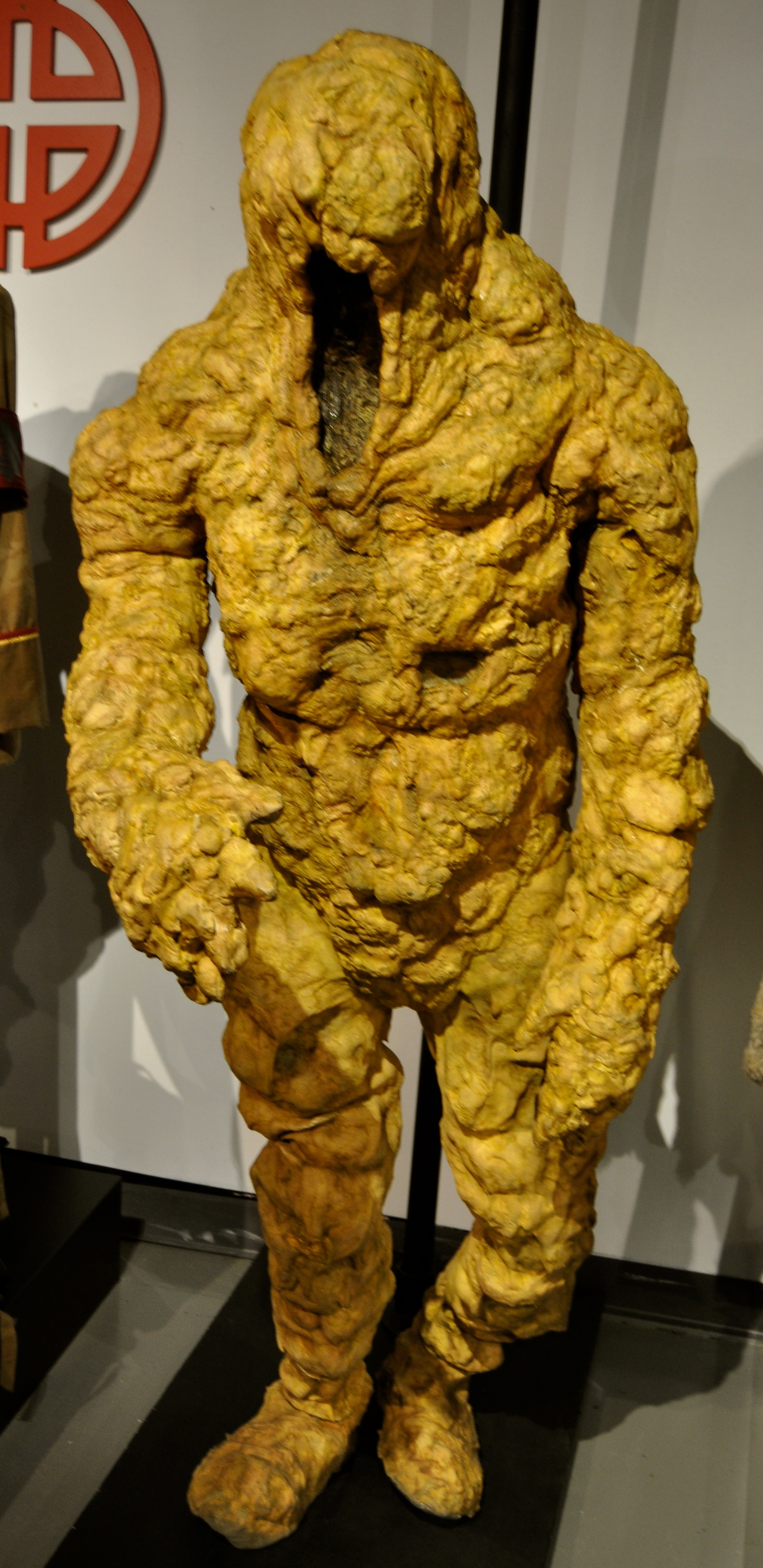
The Sandmen, as shown at the Doctor Who Experience.

They take safety in a lab filled with large pods, and discover Rassmussen. He explains he is the inventor of the pods, known as Morpheus, which are machines that send signals to the brains of the humans inside to compress a month's worth of sleep into a few minutes, and the pods on Le Verrier are more advanced than on Triton. The Doctor suspects that Morpheus has transformed the rheum in the corner of the eye into a carnivorous lifeform which digested the crew.

The gravity shields are powered down before the Doctor fixes them. During this, a Sandman appears to consume Rassmussen. Chopra, Deep-Ando, and 474 are also killed during their escape. The Doctor silently monitors the Sandmen and realises that Rassmussen is making them blind by hijacking the visual receptors in the rheum in the Sandmen and in the eyes of anyone who has used Morpheus to collate video footage.

They make their way to the ship but Rassmussen is alive, trapping them in a room with a Sandman. Rassmussen plans to use the ship to return to Triton and release Morpheus there with the Sandman, which he says is now spread by spores. Nagata shoots Rassmussen. The Doctor engineers their escape and destroys the gravity shields, sending the station and ship into Neptune. The Doctor comments that the inconsistencies in how Morpheus is spread along with the gravity shields being powered down seems to be contrived like a story. The Doctor, Clara, and Nagata escape in the TARDIS.

Rassmussen reveals to the viewer he is a Sandman, being pulled apart by Neptune's gravity. Rassmussen explains why he wanted to ensure that the video the viewer is watching was seen by others, as its glitches contain the Morpheus signal and will allow it to spread.

=== Continuity ===
When debating with Clara about naming the creatures, the Doctor mutters "It's like the Silurians all over again", referring to an old adversary that first appeared in Doctor Who and the Silurians (1970).

According to writer Mark Gatiss, the Doctor's mention of "the Great Catastrophe" that befell humankind is referring to the collision between the Earth and the Sun described in the Season 21 serial Frontios.

=== Outside references ===
The title is in reference to the Shakespeare play, Macbeth: "Sleep no more! Macbeth does murder sleep" which the Doctor quotes during the episode.

Clara asks if the Morpheus Machine is actually named after Morpheus, the god of dreams. The Morpheus hologram also uses the term 'in the arms of Morpheus', a phrase meaning to be in a deep sleep.

The Morpheus machine theme-song, "Mr. Sandman", was popularized by the group The Chordettes among others in 1954.

Those like Chopra who refuse to compress their sleep via the Morpheus process are referred to as 'Rips' - a reference to the short story "Rip Van Winkle" by Washington Irving.

== Production ==
The read-through for this episode took place on 23 July 2015 and filming took place from 27 July to 12 August 2015. A new title screen specially designed for this episode was shown instead of the usual opening sequence, the first such instance in the show's history.

After "Sleep No More" aired, Mark Gatiss developed a sequel set thousands of years before Gagan Rassmussen's Morpheus process experiments at Le Verrier where the Doctor discovers the same process experimented with on Earth, though this was scrapped in favor of "Empress of Mars" instead.

=== Cast notes ===
Reece Shearsmith appeared in An Adventure in Space and Time as Patrick Troughton. Tom Wilton appeared as a Zygon in "The Zygon Invasion" / "The Zygon Inversion". Bethany Black is the first openly transgender actor to appear on Doctor Who.

== Broadcast and reception ==
=== Critical reception ===
Professional ratings
Aggregate scores
Source	Rating
Rotten Tomatoes (Average Score)	6.34
Rotten Tomatoes (Tomatometer)	61%
Review scores
Source	Rating
The A.V. Club	B
Paste Magazine	8.0
SFX Magazine	3/5 stars
TV Fanatic	3.5/5 stars
IGN	8.4
New York Magazine	1/5 stars
Radio Times	5/5 stars

The episode was watched by 4 million viewers overnight in the UK, representing an 18.2% audience share, and increased to 5.61 million in the consolidated ratings. At the time, this figure was the lowest for Doctor Who since its revival in 2005, before being surpassed by the following series' episode "Oxygen", which drew 5.27 million viewers. The episode achieved an Appreciation Index score of 78, the lowest since the 2006 story "Love & Monsters" (76). It also received the lowest Rotten Tomatoes score of the ninth series, holding a 61% rating with an average score of 6.34 out of 10 from 18 reviews. The website's consensus reads "Doctor Who's effective horror elements and unexpected cliffhanger save 'Sleep No More' from being a gimmicky found-footage episode."
