= Jonathan Strange & Mr Norrell (TV series) =

British historical fantasy adaptation

- Genre: Fantasy; Historical drama
- Based on: Jonathan Strange & Mr Norrell by Susanna Clarke
- Written by: Peter Harness
- Directed by: Toby Haynes
- Starring: Bertie Carvel; Eddie Marsan; Marc Warren; Charlotte Riley; Alice Englert; Samuel West; Ariyon Bakare; Enzo Cilenti; Paul Kaye; Edward Hogg; Lucinda Dryzek
- Composers: Benoît Charest; Benoît Groulx
- Countries of origin: United Kingdom; Canada
- Original language: English
- No. of series: 1
- No. of episodes: 7

Production
- Executive producers: Nick Marston; Tally Garner; Dixie Linder; Justin Thomson-Glover; Patrick Irwin; Matthew Read; Toby Haynes; Peter Harness
- Producer: Nick Hirschkorn
- Cinematography: Stephan Pehrsson, (Lukas Strebel)
- Editors: Peter Christelis, Philip Kloss
- Production companies: Cuba Pictures; Feel Films; BBC; Screen Yorkshire; Endemol Shine Group; Space; Attraction Images; Far Moor Productions

Original release
- Network: BBC One
- Release: 17 May – 28 June 2015

Jonathan Strange & Mr Norrell is a seven-part British historical fantasy TV series adapted by Peter Harness from Susanna Clarke's best-selling 2004 novel of the same name. It premiered on BBC One on 17 May 2015 and ended on 28 June 2015. It was directed by Toby Haynes and nominated for four BAFTA awards and recognised by the British Film Institute as one of the top ten most important television programmes of 2015.

== Plot ==
Set in England during the Napoleonic Wars at the beginning of the 19th century, the series presents an alternative history where magic is widely acknowledged, but rarely practised. Living in the rural North of England in 1806, Mr Norrell (Eddie Marsan) of Hurtfew Abbey is able to use magic to make the statues of York Minster talk and move. His factotum, John Childermass (Enzo Cilenti) persuades him to travel to London in order to make magic respectable in the realm by offering his assistance as a practical magician to the Secretary of State for War, Sir Walter Pole, (Samuel West) a leading member of the government, in the war against France.

After being initially rebuffed, Mr Norrell encounters Vinculus (Paul Kaye), a disreputable street magician — a man against whom and his ilk Norrell is dead-set — who gives him the prophecy of the Raven King stating he is one of two destined to be great magicians. Mr Norrell reconsiders his position on consultation with magical dilettantes and on learning of the recent death of the minister's fiancée (Alice Englert), he offers to bring her back to life. The offer is accepted whereupon he betrays his desire for respectable modern magic by conjuring up a fairy with ancient wild magic called the Gentleman with Thistledown Hair (Marc Warren), for his help in this resurrection and so strikes an ill-judged bargain.

Meanwhile, while attempting to find a respectable profession as demanded by his love Arabella (Charlotte Riley), the rakish and somewhat dissolute Jonathan Strange (Bertie Carvel) also meets Vinculus, as the latter is sleeping rough under a bush. Strange is told by Vinculus that he is also destined to be a great magician so he begins to study magic after buying two of Mr Norrell's spells that Vinculus had pick-pocketed from Childermass.

== Cast ==
- Bertie Carvel as Jonathan Strange, the rakish eldest son of the lord of the manor at Ashfair in the Shropshire Hills and apprentice magician under the tutelage of Mr Norrell
- Eddie Marsan as Gilbert Norrell, self-taught practical magician and a reclusive owner of Hurtfew Abbey in Yorkshire
- Charlotte Riley as Arabella Woodhope, the daughter of a clergyman, and later wife of Jonathan Strange
- Marc Warren as the Gentleman with Thistledown Hair — the Fairy King of Lost-Hope and other places in the realm of Faerie
- Samuel West as Sir Walter Pole MP, the Secretary of State for War
- Alice Englert as Emma Wintertowne, the fiancée and later wife of Sir Walter Pole
- Phoebe Nicholls as Mrs Wintertowne, mother of Emma, Lady Pole
- Ariyon Bakare as Stephen Black, the butler and valet of Sir Walter Pole, the son of a slave who died in childbirth being transported across the Atlantic by Sir Walter's father
- Enzo Cilenti as John Childermass, Mr Norrell's factotum and one-time pickpocket
- Paul Kaye as Vinculus, a disreputable street magician on Threadneedle Street and pickpocket
- Edward Hogg as John Segundus, a would-be magician of York and later keeper of a sanatorium with his friend, Mr Honeyfoot
- Brian Pettifer as Mr Honeyfoot, a would-be magician of York and later keeper of a sanatorium with his friend, Mr Segundus
- John Heffernan as Henry Lascelles, editor of the periodical The Friends of English Magic
- Vincent Franklin as Christopher Drawlight, foppish friend of Henry Lascelles and self-appointed London social secretary of Mr Norrell
- Ronan Vibert as Lord Wellington, commander of the British Army in the Napoleonic Wars
- Jamie Parker as Colonel Grant, one of Wellington's officers and friend of Jonathan Strange
- Richard Durden as Lord Liverpool, the Prime Minister of the United Kingdom of Great Britain and Ireland
- Steve Jackson as Jeremy Johns, the valet of Jonathan Strange
- Claudia Jessie as Mary, maid to the Stranges
- Freddie Hogan as Davey
- Robbie O'Neill as Lucas
- Clive Mantle as Dr Greysteel, an Aberdonian physician holidaying in Venice after rescuing his daughter from Lord Byron
- Lucinda Dryzek as Flora Greysteel, daughter of Dr Greysteel and one-time lover of Lord Byron
- Niall Greig Fulton as the ancient Raven King

== Episodes ==
No.	Title	Directed by	Written by	Original release date	UK viewers (millions)
1	"The Friends of English Magic"	Toby Haynes	Peter Harness	17 May 2015	4.50
Reclusive Mr Norrell comes to London from York to bring English magic back to prominence, three centuries after it seemingly died out. He resurrects Sir Walter Pole's deceased fiancée, Emma Wintertowne, by making a bargain with the mysterious Gentleman with the Thistledown Hair. Meanwhile, on the Welsh Marches, the charismatic but rakish young Jonathan Strange is told that he has the makings of a great magician.
2	"How Is Lady Pole?"	Toby Haynes	Peter Harness	24 May 2015	2.60
Mr Norrell finds that something is amiss with Lady Pole and soon realizes that the Gentleman with the Thistledown Hair is behind it. Sir Walter's butler Stephen Black and Lady Pole are both enchanted by the Gentleman and taken away each night to an unending dance at Palace of Lost-Hope in Faerie. Jonathan and Arabella Strange travel to London after Jonathan finds he has an instinct and flair for magic and he impresses the newly renowned Mr Norrell with his natural talents and skill as a magician, so becomes his apprentice to study for ten years.
3	"The Education of a Magician"	Toby Haynes	Peter Harness	31 May 2015	2.20
Mr Norrell is awed by and jealous of his apprentice's talents so allows Strange to be pressed into service for the war against France, but Strange's offer of his services receives a less than warm welcome in Lisbon from the Duke of Wellington for the execution of the Peninsular War. However, he soon makes himself useful, going above and beyond anything Wellington can conceive, but Strange treads dangerous waters by dabbling in dark magic by reanimating the corpses of dead enemy troopers. Meanwhile, Emma Lady Pole is desperate to communicate her and Stephen's plight to Arabella, though she is enchanted against doing so by her speech being turned into nonsense. This desperation leads Lady Pole to create an embroidery depicting the Palace of Lost-Hope and the endless dance with herself, Black, and the Gentleman all depicted.
4	"All the Mirrors of the World"	Toby Haynes	Peter Harness	7 June 2015	1.78
A suicidal Lady Pole tries to kill Mr Norrell, but fails instead inflicting a serious gun-shot wound on Childermass that almost costs him his life, and so she is placed in the care of Segundus and Honeyfoot in their sanatorium in Yorkshire. Strange discovers the world of the Raven King's Roads that traverse Faerie — resembling the artwork of M. C. Escher — hidden behind mirrors. In his pursuit of the understanding of magic wielded by the Raven King, Strange and Mr Norrell develop irreconcilable differences and so part ways with the former returning to his manor in Ashfair in Shropshire.
5	"Arabella"	Toby Haynes	Peter Harness	14 June 2015	1.80
Arabella is tricked into going to the realm of the Gentleman with the Thistledown Hair. Strange is deceived by her magical doppelgänger made by the Gentleman from moss oak, which dies, leaving him in mourning. In his grief, Strange repeatedly writes to Mr Norrell to give him the secret magic of resurrection. Mr Norrell ignores these pleas, in the knowledge that it can only be done through ancient wild magic via the Gentleman, with whom he does not want to associate again and so tries to quash the publication of Strange's book about magic with the help of Sir Walter Pole and Lord Liverpool.
6	"The Black Tower"	Toby Haynes	Peter Harness	21 June 2015	1.60
Mr Norrell uses magic underhandedly to make Strange's new book literally disappear off the shelves as well as everywhere else. Isolating himself in Venice, Strange finally manages to induce temporary insanity so he can summon and be able to see the Gentleman with the Thistledown Hair in order to resurrect his late wife Arabella. Spurned by the Gentleman, he follows him back to Lost-Hope in Faerie, where Strange discovers that Arabella is actually still alive, but is under the fairy's spell along with Lady Pole and Stephen Black. Strange and the Gentleman battle at Lost-Hope with the latter using all of his strength to cast Strange out, back to Venice, and laying a curse of darkness upon him — the Black Tower.
7	"Jonathan Strange & Mr Norrell"	Toby Haynes	Peter Harness	28 June 2015	1.70
With Venice being afflicted by a dark tornado — the Black Tower — centred on Jonathan Strange, he decides to return to England in hopes of reuniting with Mr Norrell, so as to bring back the Raven King to discover a way on defeating the Gentleman with the Thistledown Hair and then be able to return Arabella from Lost-Hope in Faerie.

== Production ==
=== Development ===
Initially, New Line Cinema had the book under a three-year film-deal option worth seven figures with Christopher Hampton, writer of Dangerous Liaisons, to adapt it, then subsequently Julian Fellowes — both finding difficulties in condensing the length and dense narrative down — until New Line fell into financial difficulties and cancelled development.

Carvel (left) and Marsan (right) as the title characters Strange and Norrell, respectively.

On 30 November 2012, the BBC announced that an adaptation of Jonathan Strange & Mr Norrell had been commissioned for BBC One. The production was officially greenlit as a seven-hour miniseries in April 2013, with a projected 2014 premiere date. BBC America noted that it would broadcast the miniseries during its "Supernatural Saturday" science fiction and fantasy programming block.

Adapted by Peter Harness and directed by Toby Haynes, the series was produced by Nick Hirschkorn, with executive producers Nick Marston, Tally Garner, Dixie Linder, Justin Thomson-Glover, Patrick Irwin and Matthew Read. Co-production credits are shared by Cuba Pictures and Feel Films for BBC in association with Attraction Images, Far Moor Productions, Screen Yorkshire, Endemol Shine Group, and Space.

The co-production countries were United Kingdom (79.58%) and Canada (20.42%), and it was filmed in England, Canada, and on location in Croatia.

=== Casting ===
The BBC announced the casting of Carvel and Marsan in the title roles in October 2013, as well as Warren as The Gentleman, Riley as Arabella, West and Englert as Sir Walter and Lady Pole, Cilenti as Childermass and Kaye as Vinculus.

Bertie Carvel, having been given the book its first publication 10 years previously, said “[Clarke] creates this credible world. It’s not a story about magic, though magic is a key character in the story. It’s about recognisable people with human emotions. Nothing has more currency in drama than real people that we can relate to.” Feeling the pressure of living up to the book, though, he added: “The only thing that makes it less frightening to be tasked with a role that you have so much fondness for is the idea you’re not letting some other arsehole fuck it up.”

Eddie Marsan, admitting he was unfamiliar with the novel before he took up the role of the cantankerous magician, stated in an interview “Fantasy is not usually my type of thing. It’s not the kind of book I would normally read. Now I tell everybody to read it. Fantasy never came my way, I always found other books were more to my taste.” He evangelises, “What drew me to Mr Norrell was that he has all this information, all this power, yet he does everything from the perspective of fear. You see that with a lot of people who are very successful or very powerful: they’re still scared. Norrell wants to be loved and accepted, but thinks the only way he can be is by becoming this all-powerful tyrant who can control everything, so that no one can take anything away from him. I thought that was fascinating.”

A read-through of the script took place on 23 October 2013. Filming began on 28 October 2013 in Yorkshire, Canada and Croatia. Author Clarke visited the set in November 2013.

== Broadcast ==
The series premiered in the UK on BBC One from 17 May 2015. Later it was broadcast in the US on BBC America from 13 June 2015, in Canada on The Movie Network and Movie Central from 3 July 2015, and in Australia on BBC First from 6 August 2015.

== Reception ==
Jonathan Strange & Mr Norrell was positively received by critics. On Rotten Tomatoes, the series holds a 92% rating, based on 37 reviews with an average rating of 7.7/10. The website's critics consensus reads, "Jonathan Strange and Mr. Norrell sets engaging performances against an enchanting canvas, even if some of the magic from the source material gets lost along the way." Metacritic, which uses a weighted average, assigned a score of 73 out of 100 based on 16 reviews, indicating "generally favorable" reviews. It was selected for preservation in the BFI National Archive as one of the ten best TV programmes of 2015, as well as being nominated for four BAFTA Awards and seven RTS Yorkshire awards.

Evan Ferguson of The Observer wrote that you could describe it as "Harry Potter for adults" but that it was "far snakier and more thrilling" and likened it more to Peter Shaffer's Amadeus: "It's in the Sunday-night slot lately reserved for Poldark. And it's 10 times better." Nick Horton was even more enthusiastic in his Den of Geek review:

"What are some of the best British dramas of recent years? Here's just a few. Wolf Hall, Utopia, Peaky Blinders, Broadchurch, Happy Valley, Luther, Doctor Who and In The Flesh. It's been said to death but remains the case: we truly are in a golden age of original British drama. But now you might just have to make room for a new favourite. I don't think it's hyperbolic to say that Jonathan Strange & Mr Norrell is the finest new drama that's been on our screens this decade. In fact, if the first two episodes are anything to go by, it could go down as one of the best this century."

While Louisa Mellor added that Jonathan Strange & Mr Norrell "has that rare power to engulf" making it:

"...ideal for swallowing in a single gulp. Watched back-to-back, its chapters coalesce into one marvellous, unbroken tale. It's a bedtime story with tremendous scope; one that will transport you from Yorkshire to London to a Belgian battlefield to Venice, the other realm of Faerie and beyond."

David Wiegand of the San Francisco Chronicle wrote that viewers would be "dazzled" by the series, calling the special effects "exquisitely executed" and noting that "Every performance is a winner, from Marsan's mousey Norrell, to Carvel's brash Jonathan, to Englert's increasingly mad and self-destructive Lady Pole." Emmet Asher-Perrin praised the overall series at Tor.com but noted, "the ending of this series was altogether abrupt and unsatisfying for my tastes". Mike Hale of The New York Times called it "a largely unremarkable mini-series", adding:

That’s not to put down this BBC production ... but to warn those who enjoyed the best-selling book to temper their expectations. ...Jonathan Strange & Mr Norrell is great to look at. It moves along at a gallop, and it’s not boring, even if it’s not exactly engaging either. Most important, it has appealing performances by Bertie Carvel as Strange and particularly by Eddie Marsan as the crabbed and proud Norrell. In this one regard, the mini-series can be considered an improvement on the book, where the characterizations of the two magicians were a bit abstract and airless.

George R. R. Martin wrote in his Livejournal about popular novels and their adaptations:

"I saw the BBC production of Jonathan Strange & Mr Norrell before I finally got around to reading Susanna Clarke's novel. In both cases, I loved the book and I loved the adaptation. It does not need to be one or the other. You might prefer one over the other, but you can still enjoy the hell out of both."
