= Bethany Black =

English comedian (born 1978)

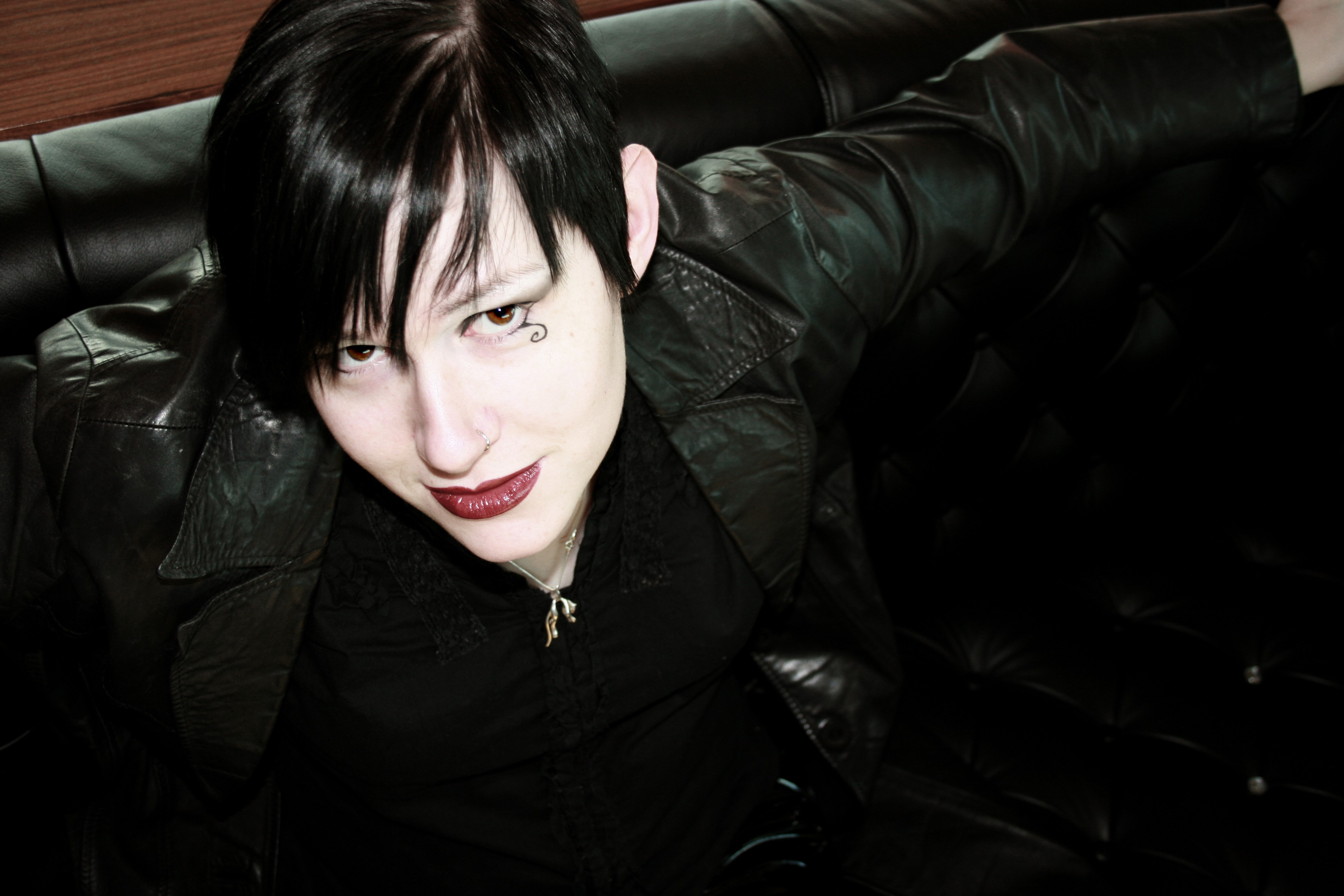
- Born: 24 December 1978 (age 47); Chorley, Lancashire, England
- Notable work: Beth Becomes Her

Comedy career
- Medium: Stand up
- Genre: Black comedy
- Website: www.bethanyblack.co.uk

Bethany Black (born 24 December 1978) is an English stand up comedian, actress and writer. As a comedian, Black is described as "managing to balance dark-tinged comedy with being warm and chatty". As an actress, she is the first trans person to play a trans character in a British TV series and also the first openly trans actress in Doctor Who.

== History ==
Born in Chorley, Lancashire, Black had a challenging childhood while struggling with depression. She attended Manchester Metropolitan University where she got a degree in film, television and cultural studies. Black had a nervous breakdown and attempted suicide on several occasions. She has described her attempts in detail. She then came out to her family twice: first as a trans woman, and then as a lesbian. Black underwent sex reassignment surgery and discusses her transition in her stand-up act.

Originally, she was hesitant about entering stand-up because she felt that the best comedians were older people. However, Black changed her mind after seeing Josie Long, someone younger than her, perform successfully while using material similar to her own. At the age of 25 she started her career, first as a compere for a music club in Preston called "Club Fuzzy", where she provided comedy between the music acts. After a hostile reaction, she then began performing in actual comedy clubs. Black adopted a "Fairy Gothmother" style, performing her routines dressed in black, with black eye shadow and sometimes wearing fetish clothing. Most of her comedy is a combination of observational comedy mixed with innuendo.

Her career grew when in 2005 she opened the Manchester Pride festival. She also became a supporting act for other comedians such as Mick Miller and attracted positive reviews from other comedians such as Brendon Burns. In 2007, she became a finalist in the Chortle Student Comedy Awards. In 2008, Black started performing her show "Beth Becomes Her", which tells the story of Black's childhood. She had previously resisted performing material about her life story for fear of how her audience would react. However, the show went down well with most of the audience. It was nominated for the award for "Best Debut" at the Leicester Comedy Festival.

Black was diagnosed in 2018 with autism, ADHD, OCD, and agoraphobia; these diagnoses were prominently referenced in her show Unwinnable at the Edinburgh Festival Fringe later that year.

== Reception ==
Black reached the final of "2006 Funny Bones New Comedian of the Year" competition, the Chortle Student Comedy Awards in 2007, and was nominated for the "Best Debut" award at the Leicester Comedy Festival in 2008.

While many reviewers believed that Black would be a successful comedian in the future, her act was criticized. The U.K. Comedy Guide Chortle.co.uk wrote in October 2006 that "Bethany's by no means the finished product, remaining entertaining rather than a must-see, but she seems to be in possession of all the comic tools it'll take to get her there – most crucially a sharp tongue and an engaging personality you'd like to hear more from."

Yve Ngoo from BBC Tyne said in November 2006 that, "A seductively intriguing cross between Marilyn Manson and Corrie's Hayley Cropper (I'm alluding to ambiguous androgyny), Bethany's material is as black as her eye shadow and her delivery as dead-pan as a Goth at a garden centre."

In July 2007, Paul Jameson from BBC Tees wrote that, "New to the comedy circuit, Bethany strikes a sullen and almost apologetic presence on stage, and her comedy matches her appearance. She appears to not have quite decided whether to base her act on ridiculing suicidal Goths, or actually court the idea that she is one! This all resulted in a rather confusing set without much continuity. However, saying that, she did raise a number of laughs throughout her set and I'm sure with more experience and some polishing of her persona, she could be a lot better."

Paul Dale from The List attacked her "Beth Becomes Her" show in August 2008 saying, "It's hard to think of a show with a more personal pedigree at this year's Fringe. Unfortunately there is so little edge to the likeable but bland Black and her nervy nice-girl delivery allows her to murder the comedy gold dust and linger over the mundane. Disappointingly second rate."

However, David Pollock from The Scotsman was more positive saying, "This shock value is an integral part of Black's routine, but the obvious comfort this tall, emo-styled stand-up has in her new self is heartening. That her story starts with abortion, infidelity and suicide attempts and ends on a note of encouragement leaves a warm glow of optimism. But of course, Black's not here to make us feel good."

In 2011, Black came 96th in The Independent on Sunday's "Pink List" of influential LGBT Britons.

== Current projects ==
Black performed a new show at the Fringe in 2009 entitled, "Love and a Colt 45", which covered other aspects of her life including her former alcoholism and drug addiction. She was also planning to adapt "Beth Becomes Her" for television with Paul Schlesinger.

In 2011, Black co-founded Funny's Funny, a comedy organisation that set out to provide a free-entry comedy competition for female comedians.

Black played Helen Brears in Channel 4 series Cucumber, which premiered in January 2015. She was also the protagonist of an episode of the E4 sister series Banana.

On 14 November 2015, Black guest starred as 474 in the ninth episode of the ninth season of Doctor Who, "Sleep No More". Black's character was a Grunt; a cloned warrior designed for physical strength rather than intelligence, and identifiable by tattoo-like markings on her face. Black's co-stars in the episode included Reece Shearsmith, alongside regulars Peter Capaldi and Jenna Coleman. As a lifelong Doctor Who fan, Black was delighted by her casting, and reportedly confused writer Mark Gatiss by asking if the episode would be linked to 1977's The Sun Makers, as both were set in the 38th century.

On 21 November 2018 she appeared as a contestant on The Chase.

== Filmography ==
Year	Title	Role	Notes
2009	Milites Christi	Emma	Short film
2015	Cucumber	Helen Brears	3 episodes
2015	Banana	Helen Brears	1 episode
2015	Doctor Who	474	Episode: "Sleep No More"
2017	Tuesday Night	Lynne	Short film
2018	No Offence	Pocahontas	2 episodes
2021	Sorry, I Didn't Know	Herself	Panelist

== Awards ==
Best Dramatic Role For Banana - Transgender Television Awards 2016
