= The Zygon Invasion =

258a – "The Zygon Invasion"
- Doctor Who episode

Cast
- Doctor: Peter Capaldi – Twelfth Doctor
- Companion: Jenna Coleman – Clara Oswald
- Others: Ingrid Oliver – Osgood; Jemma Redgrave – Kate Stewart; Rebecca Front – Colonel Walsh; Jaye Griffiths – Jac; Cleopatra Dickens – Claudette; Sasha Dickens – Jemima; Abhishek Singh – Little Boy; Samila Kularatne – Little Boy's mum; Todd Kramer – Hitchley; Jill Winternitz – Lisa; Gretchen Egolf – Norlander; Karen Mann – Hitchley's Mum; Aidan Cook, Tom Wilton – Zygons; Nicholas Briggs – Voice of the Zygons (uncredited)

Production
- Directed by: Daniel Nettheim
- Written by: Peter Harness
- Produced by: Peter Bennett
- Executive producers: Steven Moffat; Brian Minchin
- Music by: Murray Gold
- Series: Series 9
- Running time: 1st of 2-part story, 46 minutes
- First broadcast: 31 October 2015

Chronology
← Preceded by "The Woman Who Lived"	Followed by → "The Zygon Inversion"

"The Zygon Invasion" is the seventh episode of the ninth series of the British science fiction television series Doctor Who. It was first broadcast on BBC One on 31 October 2015, and written by Peter Harness and directed by Daniel Nettheim. The episode is the first episode of a two-part story, the second part being "The Zygon Inversion", which aired on 7 November. In the episode, a peace treaty agreed between humans and shapeshifting aliens called Zygons in the 2013 episode "The Day of the Doctor" has started to fail. A radicalised splinter group of Zygons, seeking to no longer hide among humans but be themselves, takes over Zygon High Command, and seeks to invade present-day Earth and neutralise military organisation UNIT. The alien time traveller the Twelfth Doctor (Peter Capaldi) attempts to keep the peace.

The story was conceptualised by showrunner Steven Moffat, who was deeply impressed by the Zygons' debut story, 1975's Terror of the Zygons, and sought to write a sequel story featuring them that would touch on numerous real-world topics. Moffat asked Harness to help him with writing the overall story, and the two worked together to produce both "The Zygon Invasion" and its second part. The story also focuses heavily on Ingrid Oliver's character Petronella Osgood,

The episode was watched by 5.76 million viewers and received positive reviews from critics, who noted the episode's focus on contemporary real-world issues, and praised aspects such as Osgood's characterisation and portrayal, as well as the twist reveal of the Doctor's companion, Clara Oswald (Jenna Coleman), being replaced by a Zygon during the episode's events. However, the episode's slow pacing was criticised by a few critics, who also noted the episode was hard to judge on its own merits without watching its second part. "The Zygon Invasion" alongside "The Zygon Inversion" were novelised by Harness in 2023.

== Plot ==
Ever since the War, Tenth, and Eleventh Doctors ensured the creation of a peace treaty between humans and Zygons, (Note: As depicted in the 2013 episode "The Day of the Doctor".) there existed two versions of UNIT scientist Osgood: one human and one Zygon duplicate. Twenty million Zygons have been resettled on Earth, peacefully living out their lives disguised as humans. The Doctor leaves the Osgoods the Osgood Box to be used as a last resort should things go wrong. After one of the Osgoods was killed, (Note: As depicted in the 2014 episode "Death in Heaven".) the other left UNIT and disappeared.

In the present, Osgood is captured by a splinter group of Zygons in the town of Truth or Consequences, New Mexico just after sending a warning to the Doctor that the treaty is failing. In London, the splinter group, which seeks to be able to live in their undisguised forms, kidnaps and kills Zygon High Command. In Turmezistan, Osgood is forced to read a video message declaring the splinter group's intent to go to war. The Doctor contacts Clara, and they investigate the situation alongside UNIT.

The Doctor travels to Turmezistan via the aeroplane afforded him by being President of Earth to rescue Osgood. The Doctor and UNIT troops converge on the church Osgood is holed up in. The Zygon splinter group, appearing as the soldiers' relatives and friends, kill the soldiers and flee back to the UK through underground tunnels. The Doctor finds Osgood safe under the church, and they bring a Zygon, injured from a bombing run, aboard their flight back to the UK. The Zygon tells the Doctor that their invasion has already taken place.

In New Mexico, UNIT leader Kate Stewart finds Truth or Consequences uninhabited aside from the sheriff, Norlander. Norlander reveals herself as a Zygon, and prepares to kill Kate. In London, Clara and UNIT scientist Jac investigate a lift in Clara's block of flats, which they find takes them to a series of underground tunnels and they discover a number of Zygon pods. After bringing in UNIT troops, they find a pod containing Clara, revealing Clara was switched with a Zygon before the Doctor contacted her. This Zygon, who is called Bonnie and leads the splinter group, has Jac and the troops killed. Bonnie travels to UNIT to obtain a shoulder-fired missile. As Bonnie informs him of the deaths of his friends, she fires a missile at the plane.

== Production ==
=== Writing and conception ===
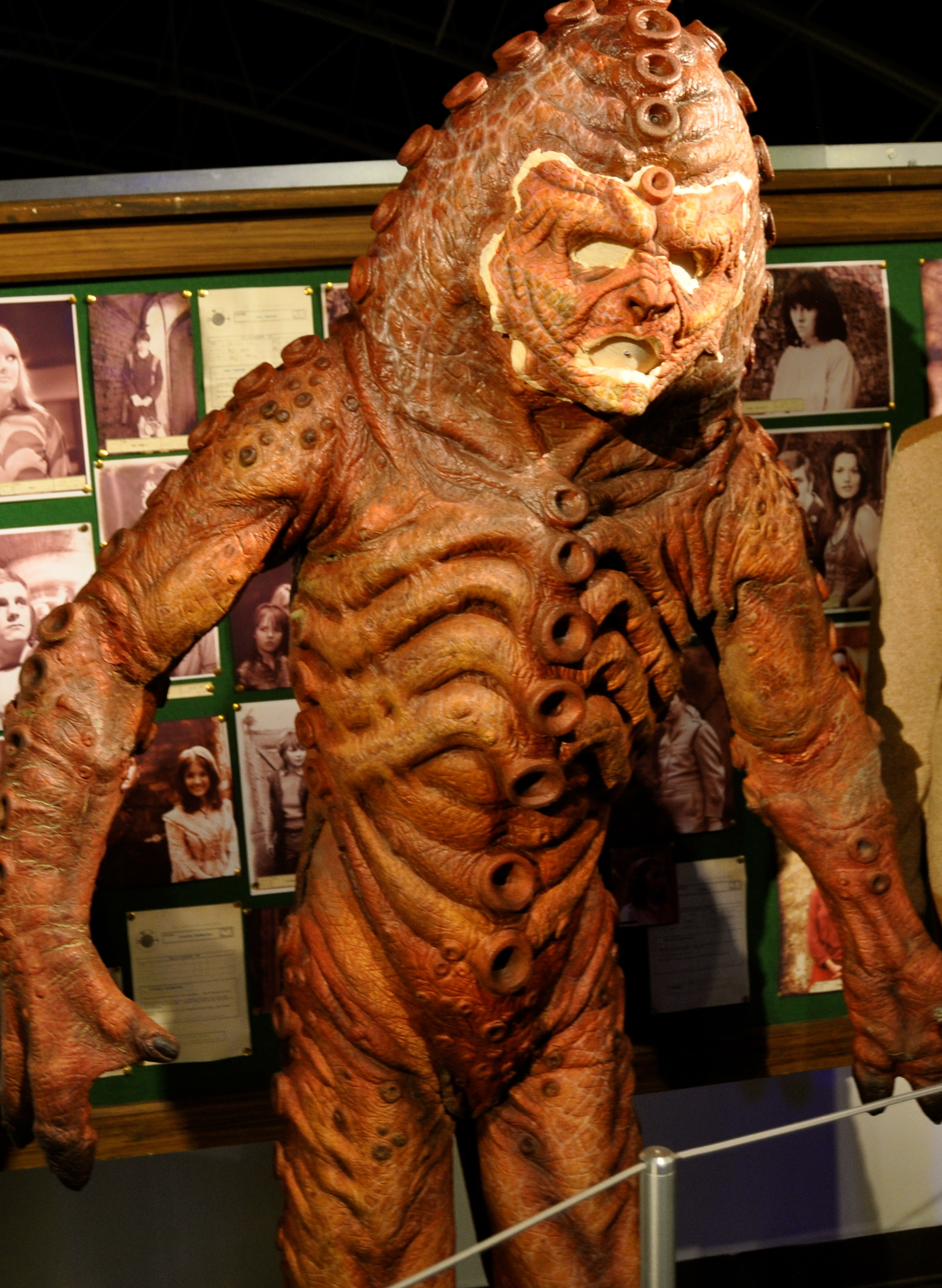
A Zygon costume, which resembles the ones used for the episode, as seen on display at the Doctor Who Experience

Showrunner Steven Moffat was highly impressed by the Zygons in their debut story, 1975's Terror of the Zygons, and had brainstormed a concept for a sequel to the serial, which would see homeless Zygons settling on Earth and would discuss issues such as immigration, refugees, resettlement, ghettoization, and the radicalisation of factions that led to terrorrism. The Zygons' prior appearance in 2013 special "The Day of the Doctor" was used by Moffat to set up this sequel story, which would be explored in "The Zygon Invasion" and "The Zygon Inversion".

Moffat was deeply impressed by writer Peter Harness's work on 2014 episode "Kill the Moon" and was keen to work with him again, believing Harness's style would benefit the "paranoid global conspiracy thriller" Moffat had in mind for the story. Moffat worked closely with Harness in the writing process. Looking at situations in the Middle East in the real world, Moffat and Harness decided to focus the Zygon conflict, based around Moffat's original ideas, on a smaller group, discussing why wars began when the bulk of a group's people did not desire one. Harness came up with situations taking place in the story in New Mexico and Azerbaijan to give it a global scale, though knew the settings would need to be "mocked up" so as to reflect but not directly mirror real-world conflicts; Azerbaijan was later substituted with the fictional country of Turmezistan as a result. To engage younger viewers, he located a major Zygon base beneath a school, and many Zygons were disguised as children. Harness also intended to bring back the character of Courtney Woods, who had last appeared in "Kill the Moon". Though Harness intended to focus on a character arc involving her that he had set up in "Kill the Moon" involving a future alias dubbed Blinovitch, this was eventually scrapped.

Moffat decided to make the character Osgood a major focus of the story's narrative. Originally intended as a stand-in and "love letter" to fans of the show, Osgood had been introduced in "The Day of the Doctor" and was subsequently killed on-screen in 2014's "Death in Heaven". In "The Zygon Invasion", Osgood serves as the figure "policing" the ceasefire between humans and Zygons. There were also revealed to now be two Osgoods following "The Day of the Doctor", with one being human and the other Zygon, and with one being killed in "Death in Heaven". Osgood's characterisation in the story would show how she evolved since "The Day of the Doctor", as well as the impact the other Osgood's death had on her. The character of McGillop from "The Day of the Doctor" was also meant to return, but he and another character named Carol eventually had their roles replaced by the character Jac, who Moffat had created for the series 9 opener "The Magician's Apprentice" (2015).

The episode contains several references to past stories. Events from Terror of the Zygons are brought up in the episode. Kate mentions this previous Zygon attack taking place in either the 1970s or 1980s, referring to the out-of-universe UNIT dating controversy, in which different episodes conflict about where stories involving UNIT in the show's original run were set in-universe. Kate references Harry Sullivan, a companion to the Fourth Doctor who fought the Zygons with him, stating that he created the nerve gas that is mentioned to be used as a last resort if UNIT needs to kill the Zygons. The Doctor's plane, and his status as "President of the World" in times of emergency, was previously used in "Death in Heaven".

=== Casting ===
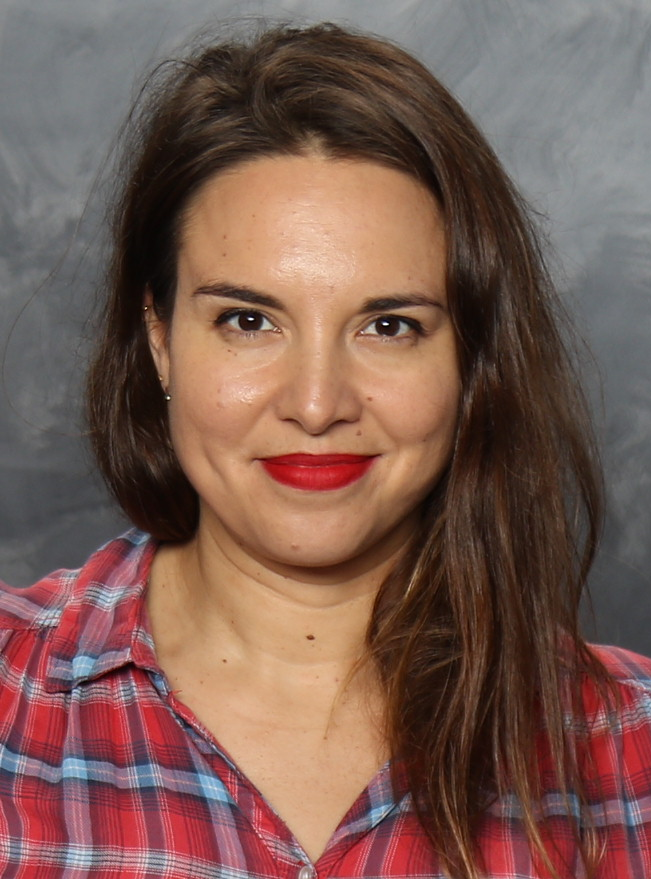
The episode saw the return of Ingrid Oliver (pictured in 2017) as Osgood, a role she had previously portrayed in several prior episodes

Peter Capaldi and Jenna Coleman reprise their main cast roles as the Twelfth Doctor and Clara Oswald, respectively, though Coleman additionally portrays the Zygon Bonnie, who is disguised as Clara throughout the episode. Ingrid Oliver and Jemma Redgrave both reprise their roles as Osgood and Kate Lethbridge-Stewart, respectively, with Jaye Griffiths also returning as Jac after portraying the character in "The Magician's Apprentice" earlier in the series. Cleopatra and Sasha Dickens portray Claudette and Jemima, respectively, who serve as the human forms of Zygon High Command. Gretchen Egolf portrays Norlander. Nicholas Briggs voices the Zygons; though he is uncredited in the episode, he was later credited on its DVD release.

=== Filming ===
"The Zygon Invasion", alongside "The Zygon Inversion", were filmed in the fourth production block allocated to the ninth series' filming. Filming began on 5 May 2015 and wrapped on 7 June 2015.

Many scenes were shot on location. Several scenes which are set in the UNIT safehouse, such as when Osgood is kidnapped, were filmed at the Old Custom House in Cardiff. Filming involving Clara's apartment building was done in flats in Lydstep, and had previously been used to depict Clara's apartment building in 2013's "The Time of the Doctor". The Barry Shooting Centre on Barry Island was used to depict scenes set in the tunnels the Zygon's had set up a base in. The Canal Park in Butetown, Cardiff was used to depict the playground where the Zygon High Command is kidnapped. Scenes involving the UNIT base in Turmezistan were shot at MoD Caerwent in Wales, which was also used for scenes in 2015's "Before the Flood" earlier in the series. The FIBUA training ground in Sennybridge was used to depict several scenes set in Turmezistan, including scenes involving the church. The town of Tiscamanita in Fuerteventura in the Canary Islands was used to depict scenes set in Truth or Consequences.

Scenes set inside of the cavernous Zygon base were recorded in studio, as were scenes set inside of the presidential plane. Computer-generated imagery work in post-production was focused largely on the Zygons' transformations and their "stings", which could kill people via lightning shot from their hands.

== Broadcast and reception ==
The episode was watched by 3.87 million viewers overnight in the UK and received a 19.4%. It received an Appreciation Index score of 82. Overall the episode had 5.76 million viewers. The story had a repeat airing, on 6 November 2015, which garnered 0.18 million viewers.

=== Critical reception ===
Professional ratings
Aggregate scores
Source	Rating
Rotten Tomatoes (Average Score)	7.74
Rotten Tomatoes (Tomatometer)	95%
Review scores
Source	Rating
The A.V. Club	B+
Paste	7.9
SFX	3.5/5 stars
IndieWire	A++
IGN	7.8
Vulture	5/5 stars
The Daily Telegraph	4/5 stars
Radio Times	4/5 stars

"The Zygon Invasion" received positive reviews. Based on 19 critic reviews, the episode holds a score of 95% on Rotten Tomatoes, with an average score of 7.74/10. The site's consensus reads "With "The Zygon Invasion," Doctor Who delivers a thrilling episode that pays special attention to character development and the consequences of time travel".

Patrick Mulkern, writing for Radio Times, regarded the episode as being "the closest Doctor Who has ever dared come to commenting on the woes of the world," noting its allusions to real-world issues such as training camps, splinter groups, and radicalisation. Steven Cooper of Slant Magazine similarly noted allusions to real-world Islamist terrorist groups and the radicalisation of young Muslims in Britain. Ross Ruediger of Vulture regarded the episode as a rare foray into real-world commentary, which Ruediger felt hadn't been done much in recent years of the programme. Alasdair Wilkins, writing for The A.V. Club, noted that the focus on contemporary issues notably set this episode apart from prior stories, which tended more to focus on the philosophical aspects of a moral dilemma rather than how it connected back to the real world. Wilkins noted that while the story did not directly make comparisons to specific groups or events, its allusions to them allowed the story to ground itself in real-world topics and give viewers an opportunity to reflect on how it relates to the real world.

Mulkern highlighted the performances of the cast, namely Ingrid Oliver as Osgood. Other critics also highlighted Oliver's performance as Osgood, as well as her characterisation and dynamic with the Doctor. Kaite Welsh of IndieWire particularly praised the usage and character of Kate, who she felt was a deeply engaging and morally gray character, while also highlighting the expansion of Osgood's character from her prior appearances. Several critics also praised the twist of Clara being a Zygon throughout the episode, finding it to be well done reveal, though Wilkins felt it served only to highlight the weak overall characterisation of Clara, feeling that the twist worked solely because a viewer, at first glance, would not notice out of character moments for Clara.

Scott Collura of IGN, while enjoying the concept behind the episode, which he felt was "thought-provoking", felt that the episode was slow-paced and underwhelming, feeling as though splitting the characters up weakened its action. Wilkins also noted this slow pace served to set up "The Zygon Inversion", though he felt it meant that the strengths of "The Zygon Invasion" would only be determined after "Inversion" aired. Paste's Mark Rozeman similarly felt that many of the episode's subplots, such as Kate's exploration in Truth or Consequences, were weak and dragged down the episode's pace, and also felt that it was hard to judge the episode without knowing how its second part would end.

== Commercial releases ==
The Zygon Invasion
- Author: Peter Harness
- Series: Doctor Who book: Target novelisations
- Publisher: BBC Books
- Publication date: 13 July 2023
- ISBN: 978-1785947919

A novelisation of this episode and "The Zygon Inversion" written by Peter Harness was released in paperback on the 13th of July 2023 under the title The Zygon Invasion as part of the Target Collection.

"The Zygon Invasion", alongside "The Zygon Inversion", were included on a DVD and Blu-Ray release of the second half of series 9, which was released on 4 January 2016. A complete release featuring the entire series was released two months later on 7 March 2016, which included a number of extras and deleted scenes from the episodes. Music from the episodes were included on series 9's soundtrack release in April 2018.
