= The Zygon Inversion =

258b – "The Zygon Inversion"
- Doctor Who episode

Cast
- Doctor: Peter Capaldi – Twelfth Doctor
- Companion: Jenna Coleman – Clara Oswald
- Others: Ingrid Oliver – Osgood; Jemma Redgrave – Kate Stewart; Nicholas Asbury – Etoine; Aidan Cook, Tom Wilton, Jack Parker – Zygons; Nicholas Briggs – Voice of the Zygons

Production
- Directed by: Daniel Nettheim
- Written by: Peter Harness and Steven Moffat
- Produced by: Peter Bennett
- Executive producers: Steven Moffat; Brian Minchin
- Music by: Murray Gold
- Series: Series 9
- Running time: 2nd of 2-part story, 46 minutes
- First broadcast: 7 November 2015

Chronology
← Preceded by "The Zygon Invasion"	Followed by → "Sleep No More"

"The Zygon Inversion" is the eighth episode of the ninth series of the British science fiction television series Doctor Who. It was first broadcast on BBC One on 7 November 2015, and was written by Peter Harness and Steven Moffat and directed by Daniel Nettheim. The episode is the second of a two-parter, the first being "The Zygon Invasion", which aired on 31 October 2015.

Set in present-day London, the episode involves Bonnie, the leader of a splinter group of shapeshifting aliens called Zygons, taking the form of the Doctor's companion Clara Oswald (played by Jenna Coleman). Bonnie intends to use an object called the Osgood Box to unmask 20 million Zygons on Earth, thereby starting a war against humanity.

The episode was watched by 6.03 million viewers and received positive reviews, who praised the episode's political themes and Capaldi and Coleman's performances.

== Plot ==
In the present, Bonnie, the leader of a splinter group of shapeshifting Zygons, has taken Clara's form, keeping her body in a pod. Clara finds herself in a dream version of her flat, able to control Bonnie's actions to a small degree due to a telepathic connection between them, giving the Twelfth Doctor and UNIT scientist Osgood time to parachute out of their plane before Bonnie shoots it down.

The Doctor and Osgood land on a beach. Controlling Bonnie's hand, Clara sends a message to the Doctor's phone saying "I'm awake." The Doctor video calls Bonnie. From winks Bonnie exhibits, the Doctor recognises that Clara is telling him her pod is in London. In interrogating Clara via their telepathic connection, Bonnie learns the Osgood Box is in the UNIT Black Archive under the Tower of London. Against the wishes of the Zygons who are not aligned with the splinter group, Bonnie intends to start a war against humanity by using the Osgood Box to unmask 20 million Zygons on Earth. UNIT leader Kate Stewart, having survived the encounter with the Zygon in New Mexico, (Note: As depicted in the previous week's episode, "The Zygon Invasion".) reconvenes with the Doctor and Osgood in London.

Bonnie discovers that there are two identical Osgood Boxes in the Archive, only differing by colour. By the time the Doctor, Osgood, and Kate arrive, Bonnie has found that either box's button reveals a second set of two buttons within. When Bonnie prepares to press a button on the blue box, which would either unmask the Zygons or make their human forms permanent, Kate prepares to do the same on the red box, which would destroy either every Zygon or everyone in London. The Doctor tries to talk both of them out of this action – the Osgood Boxes have been a means to assure peace because of the consequences of declaring a war. Eventually, after the Doctor admits the consequences he had to live with since the Time War, both Bonnie and Kate back off with the former realising the boxes are empty and were only a ploy to avoid a disaster. The Doctor wipes Kate's memories to keep the peace treaty. Bonnie calls off the splinter group and says they will live peacefully. Later, the Doctor offers Osgood a chance to ride in the TARDIS, but she refuses and instead reveals her new duplicate – Bonnie.

== Production ==
=== Writing ===
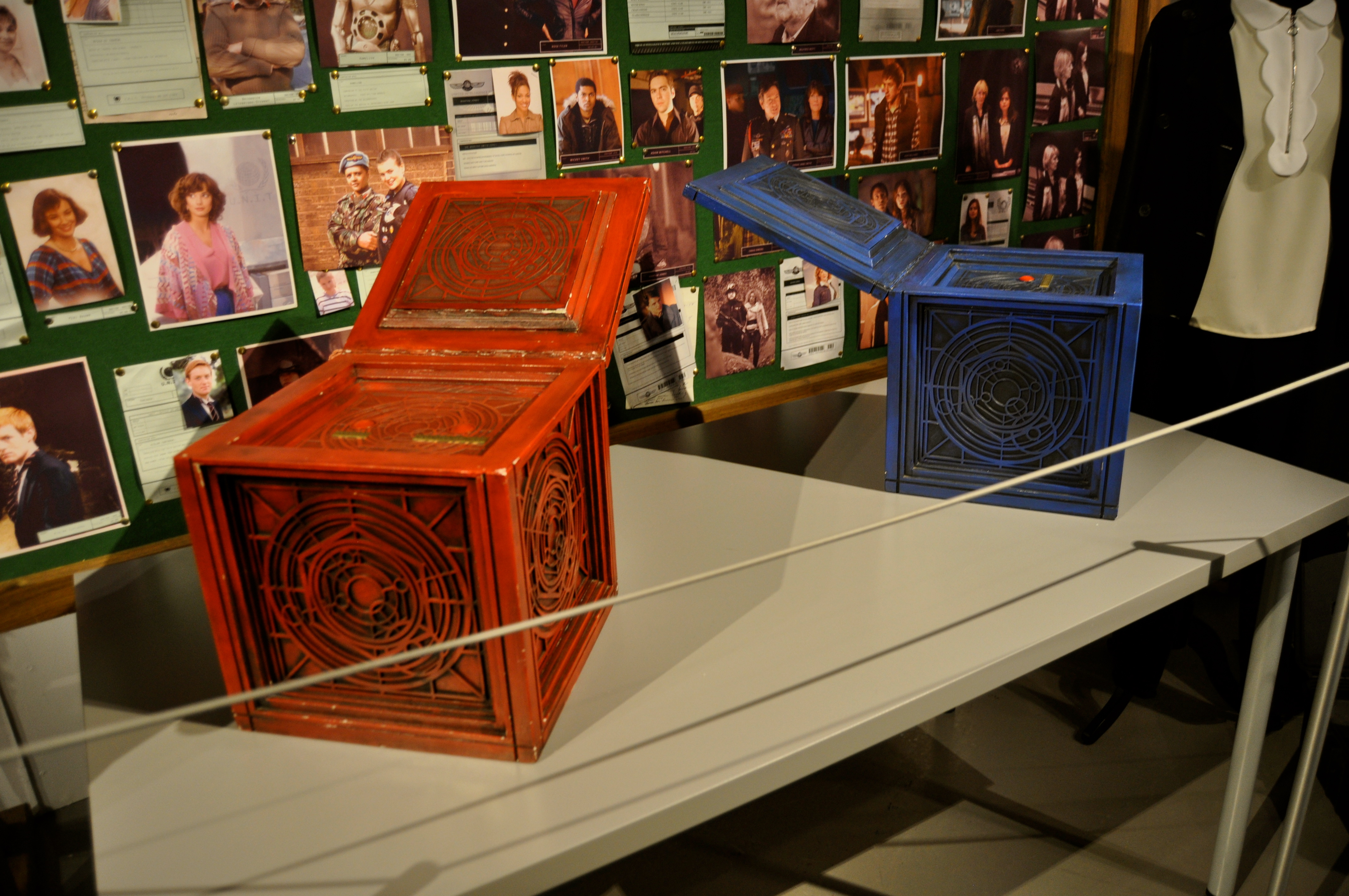
The two Osgood Boxes, as shown at the Doctor Who Experience.

"The Zygon Inversion" was written by showrunner Steven Moffat and Peter Harness. The episode, along with "The Zygon Invasion", follows up on many of the plot threads established by "The Day of the Doctor". Additionally, both use a box with the power to blow up a planet as a plot device.

During the Doctor's speech he uses the phrase "and I mean that most sincerely", the line is the catchphrase of presenter Hughie Green. Kate Lethbridge-Stewart quotes the line "five rounds rapid" from The Dæmons. The line was iconic among Doctor Who fans and was the title of Nicholas Courtney's, whose character Brigadier Lethbridge-Stewart originally said the line, autobiography.

=== Filming ===
"The Zygon Inversion" was directed by Daniel Nettheim.

At the end of the episode, Osgood's outfit shares many elements with that of the Seventh Doctor.

== Broadcast and reception ==
The episode was watched by 4.22 million viewers overnight in the UK, a 20.4% audience share. It received an Appreciation Index score of 84. The final ratings were 6.03 million viewers with a 25.1% audience share.

The episode aired a week after the crash of Metrojet Flight 9268 in Egypt. As a result, 31 complaints were made to the Office of Communications (Ofcom), who regulated British broadcasts, because of the scene depicting a plane being shot down. Viewers argued that the scene was inappropriate in the aftermath of the crash, but Ofcom decided not to launch an investigation. The regulator concluded that "the science fiction nature of Doctor Who and the storyline created a sufficient distinction from recent events".

=== Critical reception ===
Professional ratings
Aggregate scores
Source	Rating
Rotten Tomatoes (Average Score)	8.12
Rotten Tomatoes (Tomatometer)	95%
Review scores
Source	Rating
The A.V. Club	A
Paste Magazine	8.8
SFX Magazine	4/5 stars
TV Fanatic	2.7/5 stars
IndieWire	A++
IGN	7.9
New York Magazine	4/5 stars
Daily Telegraph	3/5 stars
Radio Times	5/5 stars

"The Zygon Inversion" received positive reviews, with many highlighting Capaldi and Coleman's performances and the episode's political themes as its best attributes. On review aggregator Rotten Tomatoes, the episode has a 95% positive review rating and a score of 8/10, with a critical consensus stating, "While "The Zygon Inversion" is not the most compelling conclusion to a Doctor Who two-parter, it allows for a stirring performance by Capaldi while hinting at Clara's fate in the episodes to come."

Steven Cooper of Slant Magazine called it the best episode of the season so far and claimed it was "a powerful conclusion to the story set up last week". Mark Rozeman of Paste praised the transformation from "standard aliens-invade plot line" to "a treatise about war and its ultimate uselessness." He ultimately awarded the episode an 8.8 out of 10. Kaite Welsh of IndieWire heavily acclaimed the episode, awarding it an A++ grade and saying that the episode was "Less overtly political than the previous episode, this week is an embarrassment of riches". She further praised Coleman's performance by saying that the episode "could very well be Jenna Coleman's goodbye present".

Writing for The Guardian, Dan Martin also heavily praised the episode, specifically the Doctor's anti-war speech in the episode's conclusion. He stated "This Doctor has never been written better, Capaldi has never channelled Tom Baker more, that sequence is cemented instantly as the 'Capaldi moment' in clip shows for the rest of time", and while he said that "It was a risky game to attempt the sort of contemporary allegory" that the episode did, he soon confirmed that the episode "knocked [it] out of the park". Alasdair Wilkins of The A.V. Club also acclaimed the episode, awarding it a perfect "A" grade – the third of the season. He began his review by saying "The climax of 'The Zygon Inversion' makes explicit something that the best anti-war Doctor Who stories have always understood. Depicting the madness of war doesn’t require an epic scale. If anything, narrowing the focus to a single conflict or moral dilemma clarifies the essential futility of violent conflict". He then closed his review by claiming "The simplicity of [the] setup allows this two-parter to be one of the show's strongest ever statements against war, not because the Doctor is challenging us from on high to live up to his standard, but rather because he wants no one else to know his pain". Den of Geek praised ″The Zygon Inversion″ as the best episode of the current series, and named it, ″one of the best pieces of screen entertainment of the year, full stop.″

=== In print ===
A novelisation of this episode and "The Zygon Invasion" by Peter Harness was published under the title The Zygon Invasion on 13 July 2023.
