= Peter Harness =

English playwright, screenwriter, actor and producer (born 1976)

- Born: Peter Andrew Harness; January 1976 (age 50); Hornsea, East Yorkshire, England
- Education: University of Oxford
- Occupations: Writer, producer, actor
- Years active: 2005–present
- Known for: Doctor Who; Jonathan Strange & Mr Norrell; Wallander; Is Anybody There? Young Sherlock

Peter Andrew Harness (born January 26th 1976) is an English playwright, screenwriter, actor and producer. He is best known for adapting Jonathan Strange & Mr Norrell and creating Constellation. He has also contributed to programmes such as Doctor Who, McMafia, Wallander and Case Histories.

== Early life ==
He grew up in Hornsea, East Yorkshire and attended Oriel College, Oxford where he studied English. He is a former president of the Oxford Revue. He was one of Screen International's Stars of Tomorrow, 2007 and is a recipient of the Dennis Potter Screenwriting Award.

== Early works ==
Mongoose, his first original stage play, was performed at the Southwark Playhouse in 2003 (directed by Thea Sharrock) and later at the Assembly Rooms, Edinburgh and the Trafalgar Studios, London. The text is published by Nick Hern Books.

In 2005, he adapted the M.R. James short story "A View From A Hill" for BBC4. It was the first in a new annual series of BBC Ghost Stories for Christmas. Harness went on to write several other single films for BBC4, including a biopic of Frankie Howerd, Rather You Than Me, starring David Walliams and Rafe Spall, which was part of the Curse of Comedy season, as well as the Spanish flu drama, The Forgotten Fallen, starring Bill Paterson, Mark Gatiss and Charlotte Riley, which dealt with the efforts of a medical team in Manchester to combat the disease in 1918.

City of Vice, a drama series about the Bow Street Runners and the birth of the English police, starring Ian McDiarmid and Iain Glen as Henry Fielding and his brother John, was shown on Channel Four in 2008. Harness (along with co-writer Clive Bradley) was nominated for a Writers Guild of Great Britain Award for Best Series.

His first original screenplay, Is Anybody There? was filmed by Irish director John Crowley in 2007. The movie, set in an boarding house for elders, starred Michael Caine, David Morrissey, Anne-Marie Duff and Bill Milner. It was premiered at the Toronto International Film Festival, 2008, and released theatrically across Europe and the US in 2009. Harness was nominated for a Writers Guild Award for the film.

== Career ==
Harness was the lead writer and executive producer of the BBC's Wallander, starring Kenneth Branagh. He wrote five feature length films for the series: The Dogs of Riga, Before the Frost, a new story developed by Henning Mankell and Harness called An Event in Autumn, and the two-part finale, A Lesson in Love and The Troubled Man. Branagh won an International Emmy Award for his role in the series.

Aside from Wallander, Harness worked on several other successful crime series in the 2010s. In 2011, he adapted Kate Atkinson's novel When Will There Be Good News? as part of the BBC1 series Case Histories, starring Jason Isaacs as private detective Jackson Brodie. Harness's episodes of the series won a Scottish BAFTA for Best Television Drama, 2011. Harness also adapted the fourth Jackson Brodie book, Started Early, Took My Dog for the second series of Case Histories, starring Victoria Wood, which filmed in Summer 2012. Harness also wrote and executive produced on the BBC crime drama series McMafia, based on Mischa Glenny's book about the Russian Mafia, which starred James Norton. McMafia won the International Emmy Award for best drama series, 2019.

In 2015, he adapted Susanna Clarke's novel Jonathan Strange and Mr Norrell into a seven-part BBC miniseries of the same name. The series, starring Eddie Marsan and Bertie Carvel, premiered on BBC One in May 2015. It was nominated for four BAFTA awards and recognised by the British Film Institute as one of the top ten most important television programmes of 2015.

From 2014 to 2017, Harness wrote extensively for Peter Capaldi as the Twelfth Doctor in Doctor Who. He wrote "Kill the Moon" the seventh episode of Series 8; a 2-part story titled "The Zygon Invasion" and "The Zygon Inversion" for Series 9, and "The Pyramid at the End of the World" for Capaldi's final series. Harness novelised "The Zygon Invasion" episodes as part of the Target Collection.

In 2019, he wrote a new miniseries adaptation of The War of the Worlds for BBC One, produced by Mammoth Screen and starring Rafe Spall, Eleanor Tomlinson and Robert Carlyle.

On April 6, 2022, it was announced Apple TV+ had greenlit Harness' conspiracy thriller series Constellation. In 2026, Amazon Prime began streaming Harness' adaptation of Young Sherlock, co-created with Guy Ritchie.

== Other projects ==
He has also been active in the Malmö theatre community as part of the theatre group Teater Insite both as an actor and a writer.
