= Zygon =

Fictional shape-shifting species from Doctor Who

Zygons
- Doctor Who race
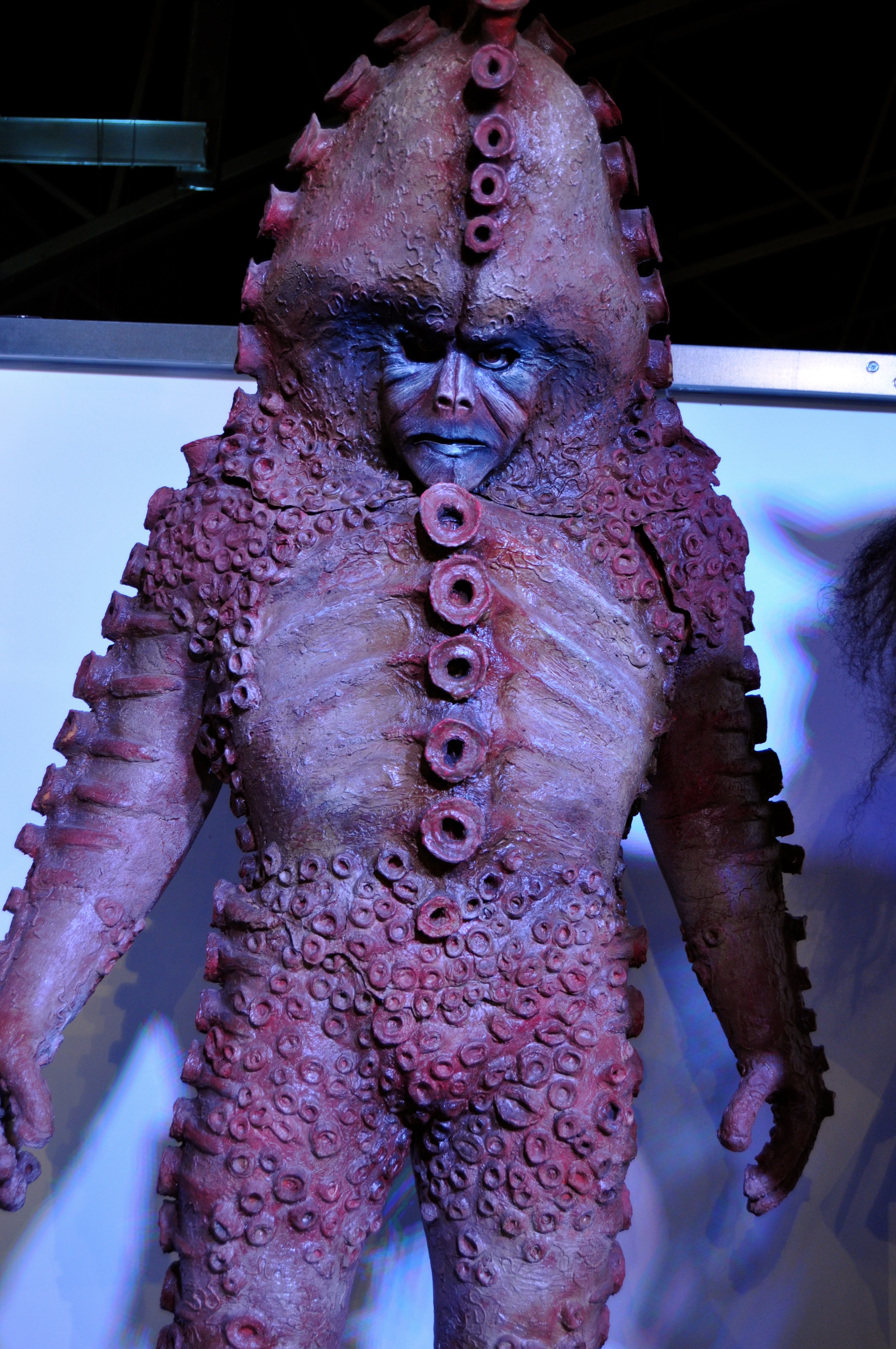
- A Zygon costume as it appears in Terror of the Zygons (1975) as seen on display at the Doctor Who Experience
- First appearance: Terror of the Zygons (1975)
- Created by: Robert Banks Stewart

In-universe information
- Home world: Zygor
- Type: Shapechanging humanoids

The Zygons are an extraterrestrial race in the long-running British science fiction television programme Doctor Who. The Zygons have shape-shifting abilities, allowing them to replicate the appearance of another being. They first appear in 1975's Terror of the Zygons, where they attempt to invade the planet alongside their Skarasen creature, which they need to survive and has, in the serial's setting, been mistaken for the Loch Ness Monster. They subsequently return in the 2013 episode "The Day of the Doctor", where, following an invasion attempt, Zygons are able to negotiate with humans to be able to live on the planet. The Zygons are subsequently integrated into society in human disguise in the 2015 two-part story "The Zygon Invasion" and "The Zygon Inversion". While many Zygons are content to live as humans, many younger Zygons radicalise into a splinter group known as Truth or Consequences and seek to unmask all Zygons across the globe, though a truce is eventually able to be negotiated.

The Zygons were conceived by writer Robert Banks Stewart and designed by James Acheson. Initially, their debut story was largely focused on the idea of the Loch Ness monster being an alien, with the Zygons being shifted to the main focus during development. Steven Moffat, the then-showrunner of Doctor Who's 2005 revival, was impressed by their initial story and sought to bring them back, developing a storyline regarding the Zygons on Earth that would touch on contemporary issues.

The Zygons have been met with a largely positive response from critics, who consider them to be a memorable design, though some felt they were underutilised or not used well in their first appearances. The Zygons' further development in subsequent appearances has been received positively, particularly for their role in "The Zygon Invasion" and "The Zygon Inversion". Their role in the story has been discussed for their allegories to real-world groups and ideas, such as the Muslim population and refugees in Britain, with the splinter group similarly receiving discussion for their various interpretations within the story's narrative. A new species of parasitic wasp, first described in 2019, was named Choeras zygon in reference to the Zygons.

== Appearances ==
Doctor Who is a long-running British science-fiction television series that began in 1963. It stars its protagonist, the Doctor, an alien who travels through time and space in a ship known as the TARDIS, as well as their travelling companions. When the Doctor dies, they are able to undergo a process known as "regeneration", completely changing the Doctor's appearance and personality. Throughout their travels, the Doctor often comes into conflict with various alien species and antagonists.

The Zygons are a race of shapeshifters who hail from the planet Zygor. Their homeworld was destroyed during the Time War, which resulted in the species seeking out new planets to occupy as their home. The Zygons usually need to keep their victims alive in order to mimic their form, keeping them in stasis elsewhere, though later appearances would have the Zygons be capable of shapeshifting via reading their targets' memories. Zygons rely on the milk of a creature known as the Skarasen for survival, resulting in them usually bringing Skarasen with them to worlds they conquer.

=== Television ===
The Zygons first appeared in the 1975 serial Terror of the Zygons, in which a Zygon ship crash lands in Loch Ness alongside their Skarasen. The Skarasen ends up becoming known as the Loch Ness Monster over the centuries the ship remains buried. The Zygons, led by their leader Broton (John Woodnutt), reawaken in the twentieth century and prepare a plan to melt the polar ice caps and breed Skarasen on the planet, but are foiled by the Fourth Doctor (Tom Baker) and military organisation UNIT.

The 2012 episode, "The Power of Three" depicts the Eleventh Doctor (Matt Smith) fighting Zygons off-screen while visiting the Savoy Hotel. The Zygons subsequently return in 2013 in "The Day of the Doctor". A group of Zygons places themselves in suspended animation in Elizabethan England, planning to awaken in 2013 to infiltrate the Tower of London's Black Archive, where alien technology is housed that the Zygons plan to use to invade the planet. Three incarnations of the Doctor are eventually successfully able to negotiate a truce between the Zygons and the humans, who are led by UNIT.

The 2015 two-part story "The Zygon Invasion" and "The Zygon Inversion" (2015) sees the Zygons being settled on Earth as part of a treaty ironed out following their prior appearance, though it requires that the Zygons must take on human form. Although older generations of Zygons are committed to integration with human communities, the younger generations resent being forced to live as humans. Many radicalise into a splinter group known as Truth or Consequences and initiate a violent campaign to obtain the "Osgood Box", a device that will seemingly turn all Zygons on Earth back into their original form against their will when activated. UNIT comes into conflict with this splinter group, and eventually the two groups discover two Osgood Boxes were created, with the second seemingly being capable of killing all Zygons if pressed, with neither side sure which box will do what. Both sides are forced into stalemate. The Twelfth Doctor (Peter Capaldi) is able to talk down the splinter group's leader, Bonnie, who is disguised as the Doctor's companion Clara Oswald (Jenna Coleman), and convince her to stand the splinter group down.

=== Spin-offs ===
The Zygons appear in comic story "Skywatch-7," which depicts a UNIT team encountering a single Zygon at a remote base. The Eighth Doctor encounters the Zygons in the Eighth Doctor Adventures spin-off range novel The Bodysnatchers, which depicts the Zygons' home plant as being destroyed by an arachnid alien race called the Xaranti. The Doctor is able to defeat the invading Zygons by poisoning their milk supply. The Zygons appear again in the New Series Adventures novel Sting of the Zygons, which depicts the Zygons attempting to set up a royal funeral in order to shapeshift into various royals. They are stopped by the Tenth Doctor and Martha Jones. They later appear in several Big Finish audio dramas, including The Zygon Who Fell to Earth, Death in Blackpool, and Zygon Hunt. They also appear in the BBV Productions audio dramas Homeland, Absolution, and The Barnacled Baby. An unofficial erotic spin-off film produced by BBV Productions, known as Zygon: When Being You Just Isn't Enough, was produced in 2005.

== Development ==
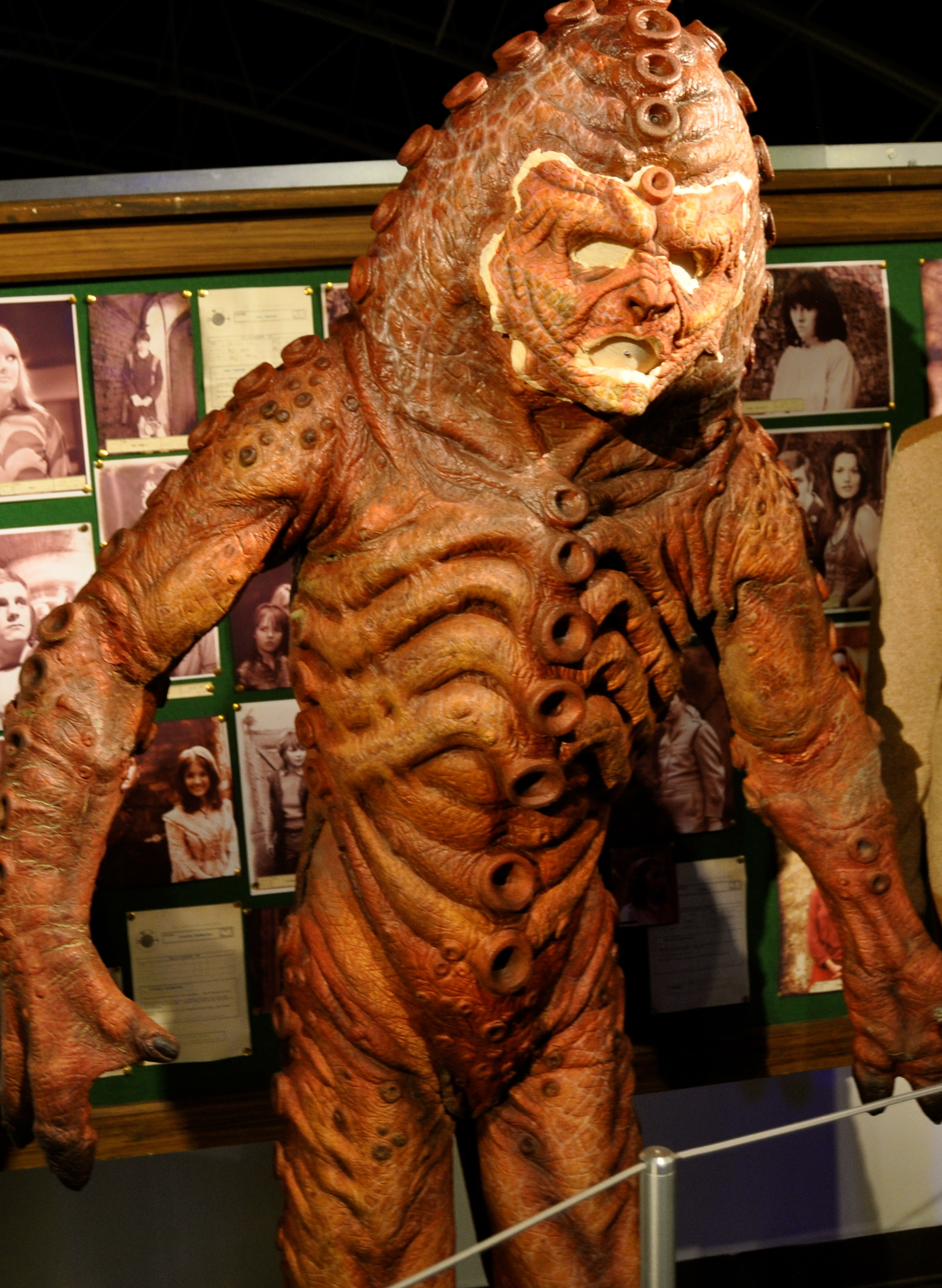
A Zygon costume as it appears in "The Day of the Doctor" (2013) as seen on display at the Doctor Who Experience

The Zygons were created by writer Robert Banks Stewart for the 1975 serial Terror of the Zygons. Originally intending to write a serial about the Loch Ness Monster, script editor Robert Holmes had Banks Stewart refocus the story on the alien species associated with the Monster (Which in-universe was made into an alien creature named the Skarasen), resulting in the Zygons taking the center stage of their debut serial. Originally characterised as scaly creatures in keeping in line with the Loch Ness Monster idea, designer James Acheson came up with the idea of the Zygons being embryo-like in physical appearance due to the fact they fed on the Skarasen's lactic fluid. Acheson and designer John Friedlander collaborated to create the final Zygon design. The Zygons were given the ability to "sting" their victims, akin to jellyfish, but this concept was not elaborated on in the episode and hard to notice in the final story.

Their re-appearance in the show's 2005 revival in the 2013 anniversary special "The Day of the Doctor" was a result of showrunner Steven Moffat. Moffat was greatly impressed by the Zygons as they appeared in their debut serial, and came up with an idea for a sequel to the story which would see homeless Zygons settling on Earth and would discuss issues such as immigration, refugees, resettlement, ghettoization, and the radicalisation of factions that led to terrorrism. These ideas would be established in "The Day of the Doctor", with Moffat using the episode to setup for a later story to focus on this idea; this would be explored in 2015's "The Zygon Invasion" and "The Zygon Inversion". The Zygons were one of only two major monsters to feature in "The Day of the Doctor", with the other being the Daleks, one of the show's most iconic monsters. Moffat believed the return of the Zygons in this story as representing one of the show's smaller success stories, as the Zygons only had one appearance at the time yet were widely popular. Due to this contrast with the highly recurring nature of the Daleks, Moffat believed their return additionally helped to create a sense of "symmetry" in the episode's story. The design of the Zygons did not change much in the revival due to their design already being considered iconic and effective enough.

Moffat would request writer Peter Harness to help with writing the follow-up Zygon story, which would end up becoming the two-part 2015 story "The Zygon Invasion" and "The Zygon Inversion", which explored the implications of the human-Zygon peace treaty and how that affected the species. The story was largely based on Moffat's original idea, and Moffat worked closely with Harness as a result. Looking at situations in the Middle East in the real world, Moffat and Harness decided to focus the Zygon conflict on a smaller group, discussing why wars began when the bulk of a group's people did not desire one. While writing the story, Harness elected to introduce the concept of Zygons being able to electrocute their victims and turn them into balls of hair with their "sting," which he felt would be entertaining for younger viewers.

== Reception ==
Mark Braxton, writing in a retrospective review of Terror of the Zygons for Radio Times, praised the design of the Zygons, stating that "the Zygon is exquisitely horrible." Literary critic John Kenneth Muir also praised the Zygon's design in his retrospective review of Terror of the Zygons, citing the Zygon costumes as "...incredible to behold," further stating that they were "so interesting and effective as an extraterrestrial design." Den of Geek's Andrew Blair highlighted the costume work for the Zygons in their debut, particularly that of their leader, Broton. He stated that while Broton was not a well-written character, the performance of his actor, coupled with the effective design of the Zygons, helped to make Broton a memorable villain.

Radio Times's Patrick Mulkern praised the Zygons as an inventive concept, and also highlighted how later changes to how their shapeshifting works (By plucking their forms from people's memories) helped make them unique compared to other shapeshifting aliens in science-fiction shows. Mark Rozeman, in a review of "The Zygon Invasion" for Paste, stated that while the Zygons were an inventive concept, he felt the Zygons often played "second fiddle" to other major elements, such as the reveal of the Loch Ness Monster being an alien and the conflict of the Time War, that led to them not appearing as a major element in their stories. Inverse writer Ryan Britt stated that though the Zygons were terrifying designs, they were often taken less seriously prior to their appearance in "The Zygon Invasion." Simon Brew, writing for Den of Geek, responded positively to the usage of the species in "The Zygon Invasion", believing the Zygons were an effective return given their lack of usage in prior years, as well as for their effective design.

The Zygons' role in "The Zygon Invasion" and "The Zygon Inversion" has been the subject of discussion for its real-world allegories. The Zygons were considered by Rozeman to be considered an allegory for the Muslim population in Britain, with many aspects of the Zygons' role in the story paralleling them; Rozeman considered this "an instantly effective way of contemporizing the Zygons", though was worried about the show handling such serious subject matter. Steven Cooper of Slate also noted this allegory, comparing the splinter group to the real-world radicalisation of young Muslims. Writing in a review for The A.V Club, Alasdair Wilkins highlighted the desires the Zygon splinter group expresses in the story to want to live in their original form above all else, which Wilkins stated helped the audience understand their goals in a more relatable manner than the Zygons' previous desires for world domination.

The book Aliens in Popular Culture stated that the Zygons represented British anxieties over refugees, with the species' differing goals (Some desiring to live in peace while others desire world domination) and their shapeshifting abilities being stated to reflect "mixed feelings regarding the treatment of refugees as aggressors or victims" in Britain. The book Doctor Who: Twelfth Night similarly stated that the Zygon conflict represented British views towards migrants, particularly via the story's usage of allegories to real-world events. The book also stated that the splinter group is allegorical of various real-world Islamist terrorist groups, with many cues in the story being used to draw audience attention to the similarities between the splinter group and contemporary events involving these groups. Magdalena Stonawska, writing in the paper Loving the Alien: How Fictional Alien Invasions Are Helping Us To Be Better Humans, characterised the multiple interpretations of the various Zygon groups in the story as showing how Doctor Who as a whole uses various narrative tropes to convey discussion about multiple current issues.

A new species of parasitic wasp, first described in 2019, was named Choeras zygon in reference to the Zygons.
