= Kill the Moon =

248 – "Kill the Moon"
- Doctor Who episode

Cast
- Doctor: Peter Capaldi – Twelfth Doctor
- Companion: Jenna Coleman – Clara Oswald
- Others: Samuel Anderson – Danny Pink; Ellis George – Courtney Woods; Hermione Norris – Lundvik; Tony Osoba – Duke; Phil Nice – Henry; Christopher Dane – McKean

Production
- Directed by: Paul Wilmshurst
- Written by: Peter Harness
- Produced by: Peter Bennett
- Executive producers: Steven Moffat; Brian Minchin
- Music by: Murray Gold
- Series: Series 8
- Running time: 45 minutes
- First broadcast: 4 October 2014

Chronology
← Preceded by "The Caretaker"	Followed by → "Mummy on the Orient Express"

"Kill the Moon" is the seventh episode of the eighth series of the British science fiction television programme Doctor Who. It was first broadcast on BBC One on 4 October 2014. The episode was written by Peter Harness and directed by Paul Wilmshurst.

Set in 2049, the episode has the schoolteacher Clara (Jenna Coleman), student Courtney Woods (Ellis George), and astronaut Lundvik (Hermione Norris) facing a time-sensitive moral dilemma over whether to kill a giant creature under the surface of the Moon—which is an egg, inside which the creature has been slowly growing—or to let the creature hatch, the three of them being uncertain what will happen to the people on Earth.

The episode received polarising reviews from television critics, though Coleman's performance and the final climactic scene between Clara and the Doctor (Peter Capaldi) received universal praise. Whilst some critics acclaimed the episode and labelled it the best of the season, others criticised the scientific inaccuracy and thematic content.

== Plot ==
The Twelfth Doctor takes Clara and her student Courtney on a trip to the Moon. They arrive in 2049 aboard a space shuttle filled with nuclear bombs on a crash course for the Moon. Captain Lundvik explains her crew is on a suicide mission to destroy the Moon; the Doctor deduces from the gravity that the Moon's mass has increased, causing massive high-tides everywhere on Earth.

They travel to a nearby mineral-survey base, finding the miners dead, entombed in webbing. The Doctor notices from the miners' photographs that the Moon is starting to break apart. They are attacked by a spider-like creature that kills Lundvik's crew, but the disinfecting spray Courtney brought kills the creature. The Doctor finds the presence of amniotic fluid near a crevasse outside. Returning to the base, the Doctor asserts that the Moon is and always has been an egg containing a giant creature growing inside, ready to hatch, with the spider-like creature being one of thousands of bacteria under its surface. Lundvik becomes even more insistent to blow up the Moon, unsure of the nature of the creature that might hatch.

The Doctor leaves Clara, Courtney, and Lundvik in the base to decide the creature's—and Earth's—fate. Lundvik primes a remote trigger for the nuclear bombs set on a timer. The three argue what to do and conclude by letting Earth's population decide. Clara pleads over broadcast channels for Earth to decide the fate of the creature by leaving their lights on to allow the creature to live, or turning off their lights if they should destroy it. They see the lights on Earth turn off over the next hour. At the last second, Clara changes her mind and stops the countdown. The Doctor arrives shortly afterwards, assures them that they have made the right choice, and evacuates them from the Moon as it starts to crumble.

The winged creature inside the Moon hatches from its shell and flies off. It lays another egg that becomes a new moon. The Doctor reveals that the sudden interest in the Moon will reinvigorate Earth's space programme. Clara berates the Doctor for forcing her to make a decision on the fate of humanity, while the Doctor asserts he cannot be allowed to make those choices himself. Clara tells the Doctor that she does not want to see him again, and takes comfort with Danny in the present.

=== Continuity ===
The Doctor (Peter Capaldi) uses a yo-yo to test the Moon's gravity inside the shuttle. The Fourth Doctor used the same method to test gravity in the Nerva space station in The Ark in Space (1975). According to executive producer Brian Minchin, Capaldi requested that the yo-yo be similar to the one that Tom Baker had previously used.

The Doctor tells Clara that "Earth isn't my home", echoing the Fourth Doctor's statement in Pyramids of Mars (1975) that "The Earth isn't my home, Sarah. I'm a Time Lord. I walk in eternity."

In "The Fires of Pompeii" (2008), the Tenth Doctor says that as a Time Lord, he can see both fixed and mutable points in time. The Twelfth Doctor says the same thing here, but that there are "grey areas", points in time for which he cannot see the outcome.

The Doctor claims that Courtney will meet "this bloke called Blinovitch". This refers to the Blinovitch Limitation Effect, first mentioned in the Third Doctor story Day of the Daleks (1972).

== Production ==
=== Writing ===
The episode was originally written for Matt Smith's Eleventh Doctor. An early working title for the episode was "Return to Sarn" (the name of the planet where a previous serial also shot in Lanzarote, Planet of Fire, was set); however, this was intended to be misleading. While briefing Harness on how to write the script, executive producer Steven Moffat told him to "Hinchcliffe the shit out of it for the first half", meaning, essentially, to make it frightening. This was in reference to Philip Hinchcliffe, who produced Doctor Who from 1974 to 1977, a period of the classic series that is recognised as especially frightening. Moffat called the script "intense and emotional". Harness said that the episode would see a large change for the show. "I still don't know how people will take it. I'm in this kind of limbo now waiting for people to see it, and I've no idea, really I do not know how it is going to go down."

=== Filming ===
Filming for the episode took place in Lanzarote, near the Volcán del Cuervo (Raven's Volcano) in Timanfaya National Park. The last episode to be filmed there had been 1984's Fifth Doctor serial Planet of Fire. Filming took place on 12–13 May, while the park was closed to visitors, with locals reporting that "they've erected a huge marquee, have trailers, toilets and a van". Filming also took place at Aberavon Beach in Port Talbot on 21 May.

=== Casting ===
Tony Osoba previously appeared in the classic serials Destiny of the Daleks (1979) and Dragonfire (1987).

== Broadcast and reception ==
The overnight viewing figures were estimated at 4.81 million. The episode was watched by a total of 6.91 million viewers. On BBC America, 0.94 million viewers watched the original broadcast. The episode received an AI score of 82.

=== Critical reception ===
Professional ratings
Review scores
Source	Rating
The A.V. Club	A
SFX	4/5 stars
TV Fanatic	4/5 stars
CultBox	4/5 stars
IndieWire	B+
IGN	9.3
New York Magazine	5/5 stars
Radio Times	5/5 stars
Digital Spy	5/5 stars
The Daily Telegraph	4/5 stars

"Kill the Moon" received polarising reviews. Alasdair Wilkins of The A.V. Club labelled the episode an instant classic, and Simon Brew of Den of Geek called it one of the show's very best, while Ewan Spence of Forbes found it poorly written with weak characters and themes. However, critics were unanimous in their acclaim for Jenna Coleman's performance and the final sequence in the TARDIS.

Writing for The Daily Telegraph, Ben Lawrence noted that "'Kill the Moon' was an excellent example of Doctor Who reaching out to different generations, something it hasn't always done in recent weeks." He felt Coleman was "terrific" and that Capaldi added further layers of complexity to his character. Lawrence stated that the guests were underdeveloped, but concluded that "it lacked the clever-cleverness that has marred recent episodes and proved how good Doctor Who can be when it simply tells a story." Dan Martin, writing for The Guardian, stated that "Clara's outburst was the next stage in what I have loved about this series most of all. More than ever before, they're playing out the reality of running off to fight aliens with a time-travelling space detective. And, guess what, this life is not all wine and roses." Martin noted that Coleman has been terrific all series, stating that: "We no longer need to make note of just how good Jenna is this year; she’s already established herself in the pantheon of all-time great companions."

Writing in The Independent, Neela Debnath praised Coleman's performance, articulating that she "impressed again with her fury as she held the Doctor to account. This is the grown-up assistant the Time Lord needs to keep him in check" and ultimately closed her review by saying "'Kill the Moon' was an enclosed space adventure with all the claustrophobia that an episode like this demands [...] It was hardly the strongest episode of the series but it was no car crash either." Patrick Mulkern heavily praised the episode, awarding it a perfect 5/5 in Radio Times. He also praised Coleman's performance, stating that "Coleman expertly conveys Clara's terrible dilemma – and later her tearful fury at the Doctor's behaviour". He described the episode's writing as "audacious, highly imaginative, and is well matched by Paul Wilmshurst's supremely eerie, cinematic direction", and closed his review by noting "Portentous dialogue, sharp direction, urgent music and a powerhouse performance from Peter Capaldi make this one of the defining moments of the season".

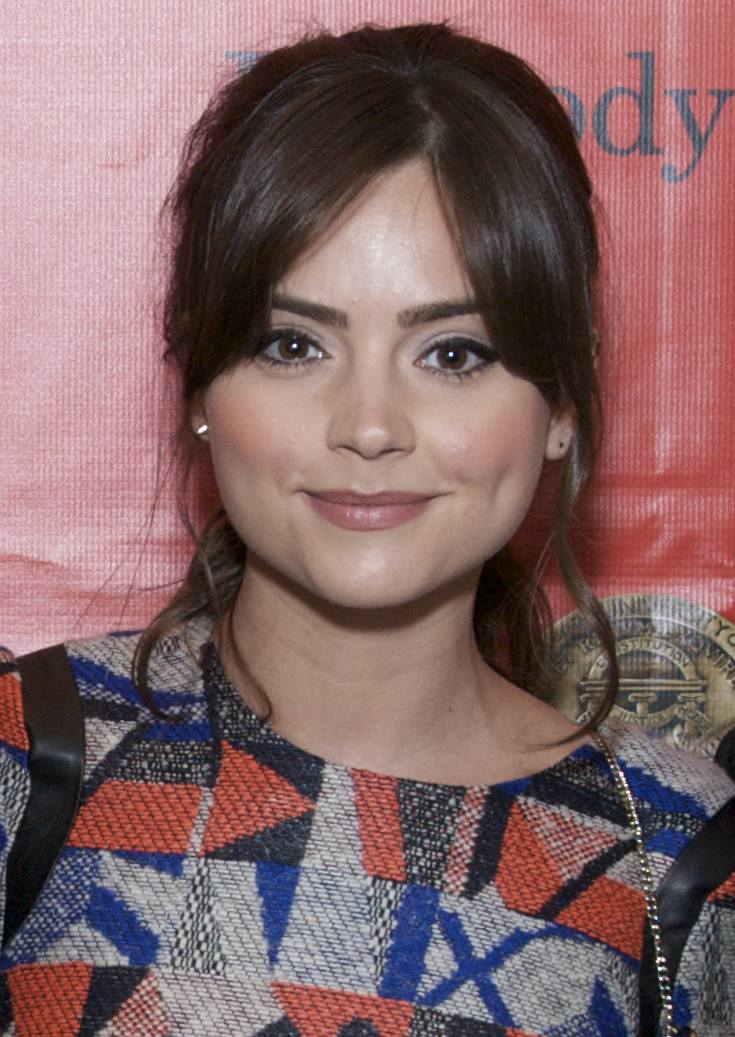
Critics praised Jenna Coleman's performance in the episode.

Brew affirmed that "Doctor Who hits top form with 'Kill the Moon'. And Jenna Coleman has never been better". He also praised Harness' script as "impressive" and said that Wilmshurst "fully understands that slowing things down and making little moments count is the key to crawling under people's skins". He closed his review by saying "The best Doctor Who episodes have something to say, get under your skin, and keep you pretty much gripped until the end credits roll. 'Kill the Moon' certainly did that, with us heading for a rewatch as soon as it was done. It has a good science fiction story underneath it, a strong dilemma, and real consequences". Wilkins also reacted very positively to the episode, awarding it an A score praising almost every aspect of the episode, but particularly the focus on character development. He said "'Kill the Moon' is the second time this season that Doctor Who has genuinely surprised me. That fact, above all else, is why tonight’s episode rates as an instant classic" and went on to praise the episode's final scene, saying that "Maybe the whole Moffat era is going to be defined by that final scene in the TARDIS, in which Clara delivers the most blistering rebuke we have ever seen any companion give the Doctor". He ended his review by claiming that "This season is already a return to form, but 'Kill the Moon' could help turn it into something truly special".

For IGN, Matt Risley labeled the episode as "The best Capaldi Who yet" and awarded it a score of 9.3/10, deemed "Excellent". He praised almost every aspect of the episode, saying "Dramatic, thought-provoking, gorgeously shot, dryly hilarious and consistently compelling, 'Kill the Moon' was easily the best episode of the season so far, and we'd even put good money on it staying that way come the end of November". He also praised Coleman's performance as "explosive and mouth-gapingly compelling" and summarised the episode as "grown-up sci-fi at its best".

In contrast, some reviewers criticised what they perceived to be plot elements alluding to the abortion debate and, moreover, how the issue was dealt with in the script. In a separate review for The Independent, Ellen E. Jones described the episode as "perhaps the weakest so far... The grey moon surface provided an uninspiring backdrop for what amounted to a galactic metaphor for the pro-choice debate". Spence described the script as "leaden and heavy... the lack of consequences to [Clara's] decision left the episode with a hollow ring." The review praised Capaldi's and Coleman's performances, but concluded that "'Kill the Moon' wasn't good drama, it delivered false controversy, and it did not respect the debate it was trying to start in the viewers at home."

For The Escapist, Elizabeth Harper gave the episode one-and-a-half stars and felt it was "a mess of pseudoscience". She summarised that "This episode is a string of scenes that don't make a lot of sense, but are vaguely held together by virtue of the fact that they all happen on the same channel in the same one-hour period." She added finally that "The last scene, however, is genuinely good."

Other reviews were also critical of the episode's lack of scientific accuracy, mainly about the Moon. Writing for Slate, Phil Plait remarked, "The science mistakes were so egregious and so obvious that they kept pulling me right out of the story. A lot of the mistakes were fixable with a simple Google search." In his review for Doctor Who TV, Clint Hassell had a similar objection. While he praised both the actors' performances and the story's ability to "examine aspects of the human condition", he said the episode was "also terrible, presenting a version of science so incorrect that it almost creates a new genre – 'not-so-science fiction'". Though part of the fun of the show is "obviously make-believe, sciencey-wiencey facts and jargon", he believed that "When [The Doctor] states blatantly wrong science 'facts' because the writer couldn't be bothered to think rationally, or consult a scientist, that makes the Doctor look like an idiot, and...ruins part of the believability of the show."

=== Awards ===
Coleman was nominated for a BAFTA Cymru Award for Best Actress for her performance in this episode.
