= Is That a Monster, Alfie Atkins? =

1978 children's book by Gunilla Bergström

Is that a Monster, Alfie Atkins?
- Author: Gunilla Bergström
- Original title: Alfons och odjuret
- Translator: Robert Swindells
- Illustrator: Gunilla Bergström
- Cover artist: Gunilla Bergström
- Language: Swedish
- Series: Alfie Atkins
- Genre: children
- Published: 1978
- Publisher: Rabén & Sjögren
- Publication place: Sweden
- English publication date: 1988
- Preceded by: You're a Sly One, Alfie Atkins! (1977)
- Followed by: Är du feg, Alfons Åberg? (1981)

Is that a Monster, Alfie Atkins? (Swedish: Alfons och odjuret) is a 1978 children's book by Gunilla Bergström. Translated by Robert Swindells, it was published in English in 1988. As an episode of the animated TV series it originally aired over SVT on 5 January 1980 as "Odjuret och Alfons Åberg".

== Plot ==
It's Saturday evening and Alfie has problems falling asleep. The day that has passed, Alfie and his friends were playing soccer with Alfie's new soccer ball. Alfie kicked the ball, which flew very far away. When a little guy acting as ball boy couldn't find it, Alfie blamed the ball boy for stealing the ball and hit him. Alfie now thinks there is a monster under his bed. The upcoming week, Alfie tries to find the ball boy and ask him for forgiveness. The first days, he can't find him, and in the evenings, Alfie continues imagining there's a monster under his bed (representing his guilty conscience). Finally one day, as he watches the other friends playing soccer, he discovers the missing ball boy. The upcoming Saturday, they meet in the grocery store and Alfie asks for forgiveness. They become friends again, and Alfie's imaginary monster under the bed is gone.
