= Reverse psychology =

Type of persuasion technique

Reverse psychology is a technique involving the assertion of a belief or behavior that is opposite to the one desired, with the expectation that this approach will encourage the subject of the persuasion to do what is actually desired. This technique relies on the psychological phenomenon of reactance, in which a person has a negative emotional reaction to being persuaded, and thus chooses the option which is being advocated against. This may work especially well on a person who is resistant by nature, while direct requests work best for people who are compliant. The one being manipulated is usually unaware of what is really going on.

== Among adolescents ==
Susan Rigetti writes, "that such strategies [of reverse psychology] can backfire. Children can sense manipulation a mile away." She instead recommends leading by example.

Reverse psychology is often used on children due to their high tendency to respond with reactance, a desire to restore threatened freedom of action. Questions have, however been raised about such an approach when it is more than merely instrumental, in the sense that "reverse psychology implies a clever manipulation of the misbehaving child".

The psychology professor John Gottman advises against using reverse psychology on teens on the presumption that they will rebel, stating that "such strategies are confusing, manipulative, dishonest, and they rarely work." A typical example of using reverse psychology among adolescents is a parent openly disapproving of their child's romantic relationship, with the objective being to encourage the relationship.

This psychological approach has proven to be particularly effective with adolescents as many of these are prone to rebellious tendencies and will frequently behave in a manner antithetical to the advice of well-meaning authority figures.

== Psychological reactance theory ==
Another influence technique that relates to reverse psychology is strategic self-anticonformity. Strategic self-anticonformity is when a person advocates a position opposite of their true thought while hiding the fact that they are using a persuasion tactic. A typical example of such is marketing techniques or tricks such as "do not click this link" or "do not push this button." Strategic self-anticonformity and psychological reactance relate to their expected negativity or disagreeableness from their influence target.

== In relationships ==
In interpersonal relationships, reverse psychology can be implemented from two perspectives. On the one hand, it can be used as a manipulative "persuasion tactic" in a negative fashion. Alternatively, it can also be used as a helpful method to benefit relationships.

== In popular culture ==
There are numerous examples of reverse psychology in fiction, cinema, and cartoons, including William Shakespeare's Julius Caesar where Mark Antony uses reverse psychology to get the townspeople to cause a riot. Mark Antony pretends to side with Brutus by complimenting his deeds which have led to Caesar's murder, while actually inciting the crowd's anger.

In one of Joel Chandler Harris's Uncle Remus stories, Br'er Rabbit escaped from Br'er Fox by repeatedly pleading "Please, Br'er Fox, don't fling me in that briar patch." "The fox did so, which allowed the rabbit to escape: The Rabbit used 'reverse psychology' to outsmart the Fox."

Perhaps the most famous example in American literature is Tom Sawyer's whitewashing the fence, in "The Adventures of Tom Sawyer", by Mark Twain. Told to whitewash the fence as punishment, Tom makes his friends think that it is an enjoyable and prestigious activity that not just anyone could do. Not only are they eager to do his work for him, they give him many gifts for the privilege.

The Swedish fictional character Alfie Atkins uses reverse psychology in the children's book You're a Sly One, Alfie Atkins! from 1977.

== See also ==
- Devil's advocate
- Double bind
- Streisand effect
