= Mera monster, Alfons! =

1992 children's book by Gunilla Bergström

- Author: Gunilla Bergström
- Illustrator: Gunilla Bergström
- Cover artist: Gunilla Bergström
- Language: Swedish
- Series: Alfie Atkins
- Genre: children
- Published: 1992
- Publisher: Rabén & Sjögren
- Publication place: Sweden
- Preceded by: Där går Tjuv-Alfons! (1991)
- Followed by: Hurra för pappa Åberg! (1993)

Mera monster, Alfons! is a 1992 children's book by Gunilla Bergström. As a radio-drama it aired on SR P4 on 5 August 2004.

== Plot ==
Alfons is about to babysit a little guy called "Småtting". When Alfons is about to tell a story about a chicken, Småtting instead wants to hear about monsters, frightening Småtting. Finally, Småtting wants to hear a fairytale about a chicken instead.
