= Hokus pokus, Alfons Åberg! =

1987 Gunilla Bergström children's book

- Author: Gunilla Bergström
- Illustrator: Gunilla Bergström
- Cover artist: Gunilla Bergström
- Language: Swedish
- Series: Alfie Atkins
- Genre: children
- Published: 1987
- Publisher: Rabén & Sjögren
- Publication place: Sweden
- Preceded by: Kalas, Alfons Åberg (1986)
- Followed by: Bara knyt, Alfons! (1988)

Hokus pokus, Alfons Åberg! is a 1987 children's book by Gunilla Bergström. In 2013, it was made into an animated film.
