= Där går Tjuv-Alfons! =

1991 children's book by Gunilla Bergström

- Author: Gunilla Bergström
- Illustrator: Gunilla Bergström
- Cover artist: Gunilla Bergström
- Language: Swedish
- Series: Alfie Atkins
- Genre: children
- Published: 1991
- Publisher: Rabén & Sjögren
- Publication place: Sweden
- Preceded by: Vad sa pappa Åberg? (1989)
- Followed by: Mera monster, Alfons! (1992)

Där går Tjuv-Alfons! is a 1991 children's book by Gunilla Bergström. As a radio-drama it was aired over SR P3 on 24 September 1992. As an episode of the animated TV series it originally aired over SVT on 1 April 1994.

== Plot ==
Milla says that Alfons has stolen the key to a treehouse built by him and his friends. Soon, everyone says Alfons is a thief. He returns to the treehouse, and begins to search for the key. He doesn't find it, and when no one wants to play with him he feels lonely and continues searching. Suddenly Milla calls, and says it was a magpie who took the key.
