= Who's Scaring Alfie Atkins? =

1983 children's book by Gunilla Bergström

Who’s Scaring Alfie Atkins?
- Author: Gunilla Bergström
- Original title: Vem spökar, Alfons Åberg?
- Translator: Joan Sandin
- Illustrator: Gunilla Bergström
- Cover artist: Gunilla Bergström
- Language: Swedish
- Series: Alfie Atkins
- Genre: children
- Published: 1983
- Publisher: Rabén & Sjögren
- Publication place: Sweden
- English publication date: 1988
- Preceded by: Var är bus-Alfons? (1982)
- Followed by: Lycklige Alfons Åberg (1984)

Who’s Scaring Alfie Atkins? (Swedish: Vem spökar, Alfons Åberg?) is a 1983 children's book by Gunilla Bergström. Translated by Joan Sandin, it was published in English in 1988. As an episode of the animated TV series it originally aired over SVT on 15 January 1982.

== Plot ==
Sometimes when darkness falls, Alfons forgets that ghosts don't exist. His father teaches him a rhyme.

Stick stygga spöke, för du finns inte!

literally translated:

Run away, ugly ghost, for you don't exist!

Alfons' father sends Alfons to the basement to pick up the bicycle pump. On his way upstairs into the flat again, the staircase tower lights go out, and Alfons can't reach the staircase tower electrical switch. When entering the flat, it's dark and he walks across the living room. The balcony door has been left open, and Alfons believes there's a ghost there. He shuts the door, and walks to his father in the other room. Alfons then jokes and says there are many ghosts who exist despite the rhyme – the clothes and sheet hanging on the balcony washing line.
