= Per Eggers =

Swedish actor

Per Mikael Gustaf Eggers (born 3 February 1951) is a Swedish actor and has starred in Hocus Pocus Alfie Atkins.

He is the son of actress Birgit Eggers, brother of actress Catrin Eggers and uncle of actors Peter Eggers and Maria Eggers.

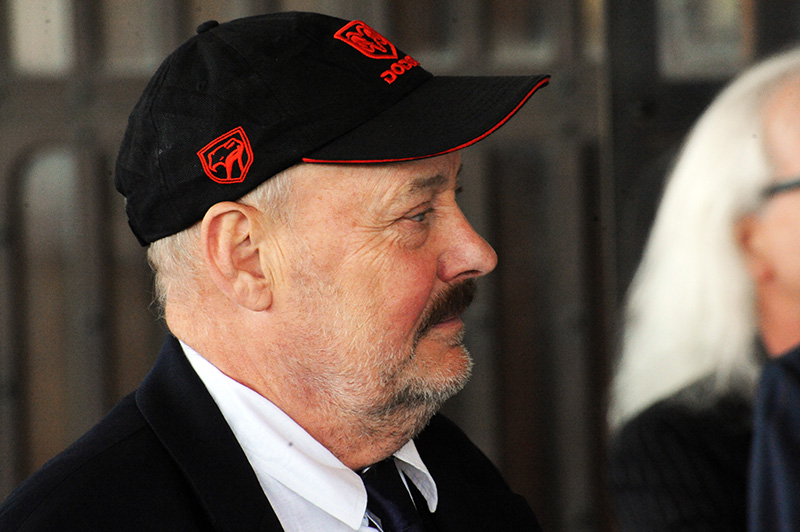
