= Kalas, Alfons Åberg! =

1985 children's book by Gunilla Bergström

- Author: Gunilla Bergström
- Illustrator: Gunilla Bergström
- Cover artist: Gunilla Bergström
- Language: Swedish
- Series: Alfie Atkins
- Genre: children
- Published: 1986
- Publisher: Rabén & Sjögren
- Publication place: Sweden
- Preceded by: You Have a Girlfriend, Alfie Atkins (1985)
- Followed by: Hokus pokus, Alfons Åberg! (1987)

Kalas, Alfons Åberg! is a 1986 children's book by Gunilla Bergström. As an episode of the animated TV series it originally aired over SVT on 1 April 1994.

== Plot ==
The previous day was Alfons birthday and the upcoming Saturday, he will have a children's party. Fiffi, his Aunt on his father's side, has no children on her own. She is engaged in preparations. Alfons says first he will invite Viktor and Milla. Fiffi states that since they often play so often, she can invite the entire Kindergarten, but Alfon's father says 8-10 children are enough. Fiffi and Alfon's father agree that Alfons can invite the children living at the same street. Fiffi writes lists, goes shopping and bakes. Alfons helps her.

The party is held on Saturday. Most children wear dress clothes, and don't look ordinary. Alfons gets presents.

At the table is a cake, and name-cards giving every guest a place. When Lotta tells Fiffi she doesn't want to sit next to Martin, because he pinches. Fiffi then changes the cards.

Then, the games begin. Suddenly, Ubbe discovers Martin has something green in his candy bag, but Fiffi states there's not more or less candy in any bag. When playing quiz, Sara is angry because she was not member in the winning team. When playing hide and seek, girls look themselves up at the toilet. When the clocks strikes six and it's time for the guests to leave, Alfons thinks it feels good it's all over. Fiffi begins cleaning up.

The upcoming day, Alfons holds an own party with only him, Viktor and Milla. They sit under the table and eat from cakes leftover, and Alfons thanks Fiffi.
