= Alfie and His Secret Friend =

1976 children's book

- Author: Gunilla Bergström
- Original title: Alfons och hemlige Mållgan
- Translator: Robert Swindells
- Illustrator: Gunilla Bergström
- Cover artist: Gunilla Bergström
- Language: Swedish
- Series: Alfie Atkins
- Genre: children
- Published: 1976
- Publisher: Rabén & Sjögren
- Publication place: Sweden
- English publication date: 1979
- Preceded by: Raska på, Alfons Åberg (1975)
- Followed by: Who'll Save Alfie Atkins? (1976)

Alfie and His Secret Friend (Swedish: Alfons och hemlige Mållgan) is a 1976 children's book by Gunilla Bergström. Translated by Robert Swindells, it was published in English in 1979. As an episode of the animated television series it originally aired over SVT on 1 January 1980.

== Plot ==
Alfie is bored and plays with his secret friend Malcolm. They play with a toy train, and suddenly Alfie's father's tobacco pipe, which they have used for the locomotive, is gone. Alfie's father is upset when they lay the table, while eating and hurry to Kindergarten. Malcolm is always there. When they're gone Malcolm gets a present, because he is moving away. It includes new batteries for Alfie's flashlight. Using the flashlight, they finally find the tobacco pipe.

== In the real world ==
In February 2009 a 23-year-old man in Sweden, accused for drunk driving, was freed by the law court in a trial which was given attention when he blamed a guy named Mållgan (Malcolm's original Swedish name) for driving his car.
