= Who'll Save Alfie Atkins? =

1976 children's book by Gunilla Bergström

- Author: Gunilla Bergström
- Original title: Vem räddar Alfons Åberg?
- Translator: Robert Swindells
- Illustrator: Gunilla Bergström
- Cover artist: Gunilla Bergström
- Language: Swedish
- Series: Alfie Atkins
- Genre: children
- Published: 1976
- Publisher: Rabén & Sjögren
- Publication place: Sweden
- English publication date: 1979
- Preceded by: Alfie and His Secret Friend (1976)
- Followed by: You're a Sly One, Alfie Atkins! (1977)

Who'll Save Alfie Atkins? (Swedish: Vem räddar Alfons Åberg?) is a 1976 children's book by Gunilla Bergström. Translated by Robert Swindells, it was published in English in 1979. As an episode of the animated TV series it originally aired over SVT on 13 January 1981. The theme is friends, imaginary and real ones.

== Book cover ==
The book cover depicts Victor holding Alfie, while an older guy sprays down the jackets using waterguns.

== Plot ==
Alfie Atkins sits alone inside the flat where he lives, feeling lonely. He has just moved to a new place and doesn't know the children living there. Sometimes he's visited by his imaginary friend Malcolm When they play together, Alfie is always allowed to be train driver when they play train, and if Alfie drops a plate, Alfie blames it on Malcolm and Malcolm doesn't get angry. Malcolm can change size becoming larger and beat up older guys within a row. He can also save three older guys in a while from a burning house. The only problem is that Malcolm isn't there when needed as when older guys chase Alfie, spraying down his jacket with waterguns.

Once day on his way home, Alfie hears someone crying when walking up the staircase tower. Alfie hurries, and doesn't notice that Malcolm thinks it's time to leave. Sitting there is a boy called Victor. He's bleeding, his trousers have a tear and he tells that the older guys are strong and fight, not allowing Victor to play with them. He has dropped the key and his mother isn't at home, and he can't enter the flat.

Victor follows Alfie into his apartment. Inside the bathroom Alfie brings a first aid kit, and places adhesive bandages on Victor's knee. Alfie asks if they need to call the ambulance, but Victor thinks it's better to play for a while. They build tall towers out toy blocks, when playing train Victor is allowed to be train driver, with Alfie as passenger. Alfie then even gives Victor his bun. When Victor leaves they decide to play even the upcoming day.

Since that day, Alfie and Victor are best friends but sometimes they quarrel building towers of blocks rolling them over, fight over who will be train driver when playing train, and both want the biggest bun. But every time the older guys appear, Alfie ends up saved by Victor.

Time progresses and Alfie has soon forgotten Malcolm since a very long time ago. Malcolm doesn't get upset, he just disappears. Nobody knows where he disappears, but it's supposed to be to someone else who feels lonely, sad and needs a secret friend.
