= Hocus Pocus Alfie Atkins =

2013 Danish-Norwegian-Swedish animated film

- Swedish: Hokus Pokus Alfons Åberg
- Directed by: Torill Kove
- Written by: Hans Åke Gabrielsson; Tora Berg
- Based on: Alfie Atkins by Gunilla Bergström
- Produced by: Kristin Ulseth
- Starring: Henrik Forsbak Langfeldt; Kim Haugen; Inger Teien; Hallvard Lydvo; Linnea Aksnes-Pehrson; Fredrik Frafjord; Emily Hammer
- Edited by: Anders Sørensen
- Music by: Ulf Turesson; Niklas Fransson
- Production companies: Maipo Film; A. Film Production; Eyeworks; SVT; Norsk Filminstitutt; Svenska Filminstitutet; Det Danske Filminstitut; Nordisk Film; TV Fond Media
- Release dates: August 23, 2013 (Sweden); September 13, 2013 (Norway); December 25, 2013 (Denmark)
- Running time: 76 minutes
- Countries: Sweden; Denmark; Norway
- Language: Swedish

Hocus Pocus Alfie Atkins (Swedish: Hokus Pokus Alfons Åberg) is a 2013 Danish-Norwegian-Swedish animated feature film directed by Torill Kove. It is based on the book of the same title from the Alfie Atkins book series by Gunilla Bergström.

== Plot ==
Alfie Atkins wants a dog for his birthday, but his father says he's way too small to take care of it. When he goes to school later on, he's also told by the bigger children in school that he's too small to play with them. Alfie then meets an old man that can conjure money out of thin air and decides to use his help to gain a dog.

== Cast ==
- Markus Engdahl-Alfons Åberg, Mållgan
- Gustaf Hammarsten-Pappa Åberg
- Per Eggers-Trollkarl
- Gunilla Röör-Trollkarl Fru Singoalla
- Sofia Wendt-Milla
- Adrian Bratt-Viktor
