= Good Night, Alfie Atkins =

1972 book by Gunilla Bergström

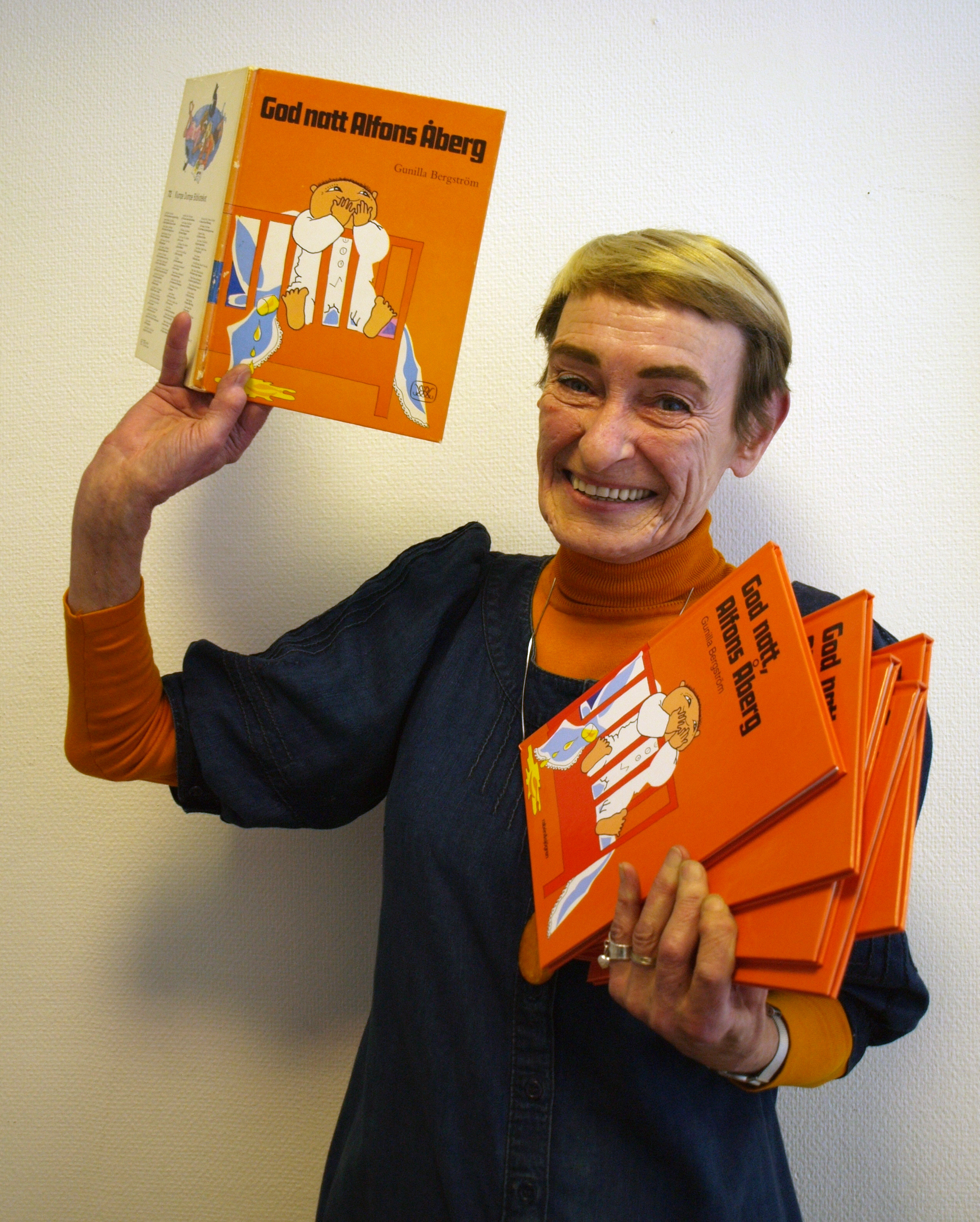
- Gunilla Bergström holding the book
- Author: Gunilla Bergström
- Original title: God natt, Alfons Åberg
- Translator: Elisabeth Kallick Dyssegaard
- Illustrator: Gunilla Bergström
- Cover artist: Gunilla Bergström
- Language: Swedish
- Series: Alfie Atkins
- Genre: children
- Published: 1972
- Publisher: Rabén & Sjögren
- Publication place: Sweden
- English publication date: 2005
- Followed by: Very Tricky, Alfie Atkins (1973)

Good Night, Alfie Atkins (Swedish: God natt, Alfons Åberg) is a 1972 children's book by Gunilla Bergström. Translated by Elisabeth Kallick Dyssegaard, it was published in English in 2005.

As an episode of the animated TV series it originally aired over TV2 on 2 January 1980.

It has also been recorded on a 1980 cassette tape with Alfie Atkins stories.

The book is one of the titles in the book Tusen svenska klassiker (2009).

== Plot ==
It's nine o'clock in the evening, but Alfons doesn't want to go to bed. His father reads a fairytale about a horse. Alfons suddenly realizes he hasn't brushed his teeth and goes up to do that. He then feels thirsty and after drinking he realizes he has spilled, and his father has to clean up. He then needs to pee, and his father has to bring a pot.

Alfons then says there's a lion inside the wardrobe and his father has to go looking, and says lions usually aren't in wardrobes. Alfons then wants his Teddy Bear. His father searches the bathroom and then finds it under the couch. When he hasn't come back Alfons finds his father sleeping in the floor with the Teddy Bear next to him. Alfons covers his father with a duvet and then goes back to bed and falls asleep.
