= Bara knyt, Alfons! =

1988 children's book by Gunilla Bergström

- Author: Gunilla Bergström
- Illustrator: Gunilla Bergström
- Cover artist: Gunilla Bergström
- Language: Swedish
- Series: Alfie Atkins
- Genre: children
- Published: 1988
- Publisher: Rabén & Sjögren
- Publication place: Sweden
- Preceded by: Hokus pokus, Alfons Åberg! (1987)
- Followed by: Vad sa pappa Åberg (1989)

Bara knyt, Alfons! (English: Just tie, Alfons!) is a 1988 children's book by Gunilla Bergström. As an episode of the animated TV series it originally aired over SVT on 1 April 1994.

== Book cover ==
The book cover shows Alfons as he ties a bow.

== Plot ==
Alfons Åberg is five years old, and yesterday he learned to tie bows. Viktor and Milla will soon come and play. Alfons ties ropes across the kitchen, and his father has to walk above or go under the ropes.

Suddenly, Viktor and Milla show up. The entire home is full of ropes, and one rope is attached to the flat's door. Meanwhile, Alfon's father falls on one of the ropes. Viktor and Milla come inside and see that Alfons has made a mini-aerial tramway with boxes for the Teddybears. Together, they loosen all the rope but keep the aerial tramway. The children then play with it for a long time.
