= Raska på, Alfons Åberg =

1975 children's book by Gunilla Bergström

- Author: Gunilla Bergström
- Illustrator: Gunilla Bergström
- Cover artist: Gunilla Bergström
- Language: Swedish
- Series: Alfie Atkins
- Genre: children
- Published: 1975
- Publisher: Rabén & Sjögren
- Publication place: Sweden
- Preceded by: Very Tricky, Alfie Atkins (1975)
- Followed by: Alfie and His Secret Friend (1976)

Raska på, Alfons Åberg is a 1975 children's book by Gunilla Bergström. As an episode of the animated TV series it originally aired over SVT on 31 December 1979.

== Plot ==
It's morning and Alfons Åberg will soon go to Kindergarten. After dressing his doll Lisa with his clothes and fixed the wheels on his toy car. Suddenly, he discovers a new book about animals. It has been broken and he has to repair it. However, he first gets stuck in the adhesive tape.

His father tells Alfons to come, and when Alfons has to pick up the newspaper, he gets fascinated by an article of a fire and a photographs on a firefighter. At the breakfast table Alfons first plays with the food and then has to hurry and brush his teeth before taking on his outerwear. When they are about to leave, his father is gone and Alfons gets worried that maybe his father already left. However, his father is in the kitchen reading the newspaper.
