= Var är bus-Alfons? =

1982 children's book by Gunilla Bergström

- Author: Gunilla Bergström
- Illustrator: Gunilla Bergström
- Cover artist: Gunilla Bergström
- Language: Swedish
- Series: Alfie Atkins
- Genre: children
- Published: 1982
- Publisher: Rabén & Sjögren
- Publication place: Sweden
- Preceded by: Är du feg, Alfons Åberg? (1981)
- Followed by: Who's Scaring Alfie Atkins? (1983)

Var är bus-Alfons? is a 1982 children's book by Gunilla Bergström. As an episode of the animated TV series it originally aired over SVT on 11 November 1988. The original title was "Slutbusat, Alfons Åberg!"

== Book cover ==
The book cover depicts the main character standing outside a schoolhouse, holding his jacket in his right hand, and an alphabet book in his left.

== Plot ==
Alfons Åberg is seven years old and is due to start the first grade at primary school.

Alfons has recently gone through a sudden shift in personality; previously known for his happy and disobedient nature, he has become quiet and responsible. The change worries his father, who speaks to Alfons about his concerns. Alfons' father says that 7-year-old children all across Sweden are now thinking of tomorrow, scared, curious and worried. This calms Alfons, and he drifts off to sleep.

The upcoming day, Alfons' father accompanies Alfons to school, reminding him that everyone else is as nervous as he is. Inside the classroom, the children tell their teacher their names and are assigned their desk. Their schoolteacher tells them a secret, which makes the children laugh and eases their worries.

Alfons walks home together with a classmate. They play in a ditch, using sticks to build bridges and boats, instead of walking directly home as Alfons had been told.

When Alfons returns home, he explains that his schoolteacher was the most nervous of them all. She bought a new dress, had her hair curled at the hairdresser's and couldn't fall asleep because of her nervousness in having to meet an entire class of children and their parents.

Before dinner, Alfons claims to have washed his hands before eating, despite not having done so. His jacket and bags have been tossed on the floor. Alfons has returned to his old self.
