= Very Tricky, Alfie Atkins =

1973 children's book by Gunilla Bergström

- Author: Gunilla Bergström
- Original title: Aja baja, Alfons Åberg
- Translator: Elisabeth Kallick Dyssegaard
- Illustrator: Gunilla Bergström
- Cover artist: Gunilla Bergström
- Language: Swedish
- Series: Alfie Atkins
- Genre: children
- Published: 1973
- Publisher: Rabén & Sjögren
- Publication place: Sweden
- English publication date: 2005
- Preceded by: Good Night, Alfie Atkins (1972)
- Followed by: Raska på, Alfons Åberg (1975)

Very Tricky, Alfie Atkins (Swedish: Aja baja, Alfons Åberg) is a 1973 children's book by Gunilla Bergström. Translated by Elisabeth Kallick Dyssegaard, it was published in English in 2005. As an episode of the animated TV series it originally aired over SVT on 4 January 1980.

== Book cover ==
The book cover depicts Alfie Atkins, climbing out of the wooden helicopter in the jungle.

== Plot ==
Alfie is 5 years old, and likes it when his father plays with him. His father keeps his toolbox in the wardrobe, but Alfie is not allowed to use it, because the saw is dangerous. Instead, Alfie enjoys playing with his cat Puzzle.

Some days Alfie's father sits alone reading the newspaper and watching TV, not caring much for what Alfie does. When Alfie asks for the toolbox he is allowed to use it, as long as he watches out for the saw.

Alfie brings the toolbox and planks. His father continues to read and tells him not to use the saw. Alfie works with the tools and only the sound of the hammer is heard. Alfie builds a helicopter and imagines himself travelling over the jungle at night, under the Moonlight. Puzzle turns into a lion and runs right towards Alfie. Alfie yells that he needs the saw and his father looks to see what is happening. He now joins his son in the game. They pretend to travel away watching boats, cars, planes and clouds from the sky, before landing in the living room.

When the TV news begins, Alfie's father wants to watch. Alfie pretends to be stuck between the planks and his father says he maybe needs to use the saw to break him free. Alfie admits he was just pretending to be stuck and it is not necessary to use the saw. Alfie is happy that his father played with him.
