= Listen (Doctor Who) =

245 – "Listen"
- Doctor Who episode
- Promotional image for the episode

Cast
- Doctor: Peter Capaldi – Twelfth Doctor
- Companion: Jenna Coleman – Clara Oswald
- Others: Samuel Anderson – Danny Pink/Orson Pink; Remi Gooding – Rupert Pink; Robert Goodman – Reg; Kiran Shah – Figure

Production
- Directed by: Douglas Mackinnon
- Written by: Steven Moffat
- Produced by: Peter Bennett
- Executive producers: Steven Moffat; Brian Minchin
- Music by: Murray Gold
- Series: Series 8
- Running time: 48 minutes
- First broadcast: 13 September 2014

Chronology
← Preceded by "Robot of Sherwood"	Followed by → "Time Heist"

"Listen" is the fourth episode of the eighth series of the British science fiction television programme Doctor Who, first broadcast on BBC One on 13 September 2014. It was written by Steven Moffat and directed by Douglas Mackinnon.

In the episode, alien time traveller the Doctor (Peter Capaldi) attempts to track down a creature with the perfected ability to hide, while his companion Clara (Jenna Coleman) struggles with a date with former soldier Danny Pink (Samuel Anderson).

"Listen" was watched by 7.01 million viewers in the UK and received critical acclaim for Moffat’s script, Mackinnon’s direction and the performances of Capaldi, Coleman and Anderson. The episode was nominated for the Hugo Award for Best Dramatic Presentation (Short Form).

== Plot ==
Clara, on a dinner date with Danny, gets into an argument about Danny's army career. She walks out on the date, not wishing to aggravate the situation. At her flat, she finds the Twelfth Doctor, who wants her help to explore the idea of an entity with the perfect ability to hide, and how it may be tied to a childhood fear everyone has of a hand grabbing them from under one's bed.

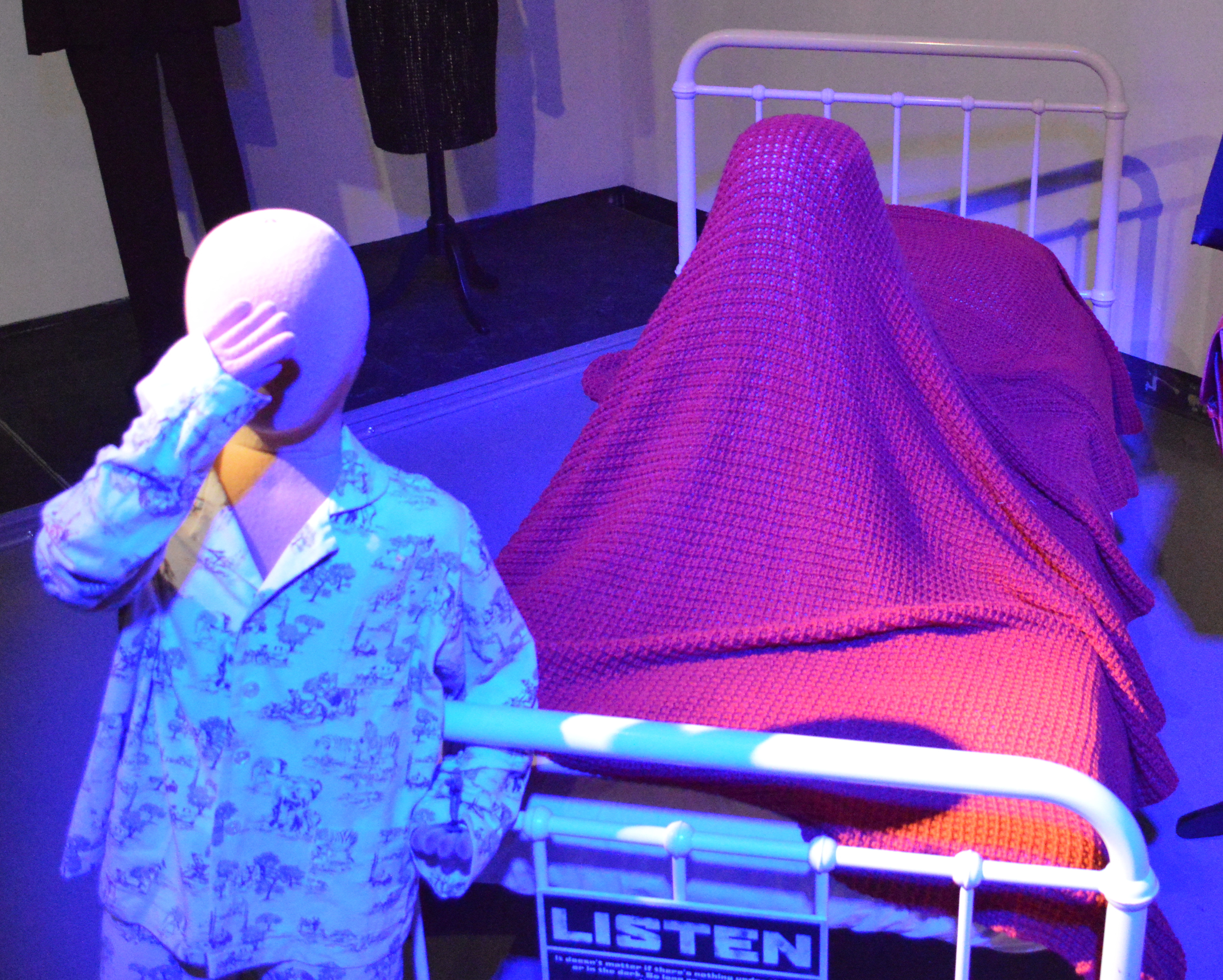
Young Danny's costume, and the figure under the bed, on display at the Doctor Who Experience

Clara uses the TARDIS' telepathic circuits to take her to her childhood, but her thoughts wander, and she lands the TARDIS at the children's home where Danny, then known as Rupert, grew up. Rupert is frightened by something under his bed spread. (Note: The episode is ambiguous as to whether the entity under the bed spread is the same as the hiding entity the Doctor is looking for, or if it is one of the children at the children's home playing tricks on Rupert.) The Doctor suggests he use his fear to empower him, and Clara suggests he protect himself with his toy soldiers. Rupert is comforted and falls back asleep, and the Doctor scrambles his memory, accidentally giving Rupert dreams of being “Dan the soldier man,” one of the toy soldiers.

In the present, Clara returns to apologise to Danny, but her familiarity with his past troubles him, and he leaves. She is beckoned back to the TARDIS by a space-suited figure called Orson Pink, who has the “Dan the soldier man” toy as an heirloom. While using the telepathic circuits, the Doctor had found Orson, one of humanity's first time travel pilots, stranded in his ship at the end of the universe. The Doctor returns to the ship in an attempt to observe the entity, while Clara and Orson wait in the TARDIS. An air seal ruptures and the Doctor falls unconscious. (Note: The episode is ambiguous as to whether the Doctor is knocked out by the entity the Doctor is looking for or an object sucked into space by the rupture. The cause of the rupture is also unstated.) Orson rescues him, and Clara uses the telepathic circuits to try to return home.

The TARDIS ends up in a barn, with a boy fitfully sleeping inside. Clara goes to investigate, but hides under the boy's bed when two adults enter, speaking of the child being unfit to be a Time Lord. She realises the boy is the Doctor and, consequently, that they are on Gallifrey. When the adults leave, the boy tries to leave the bed, but Clara grabs his ankle, recognising she created this fear in the Doctor. She repeats the Doctor's advice on fear to the boy and sees him to sleep. Back in the TARDIS, the Doctor recovers. Clara makes him promise not to learn where they are. The Doctor drops Orson and Clara off to their respective times, with the latter deciding to return to Danny through her encounter with Orson. Clara and Danny mutually apologise for their behaviour before sharing a kiss. Meanwhile, the Doctor, seemingly overcome by a revelation, is shown to be satisfied with his musings.

=== Continuity ===
The reason for the War Doctor choosing an abandoned barn for his activation of 'The Moment' in 2013's "The Day of the Doctor" is revealed, as the barn is shown to be the Doctor's childhood home on Gallifrey.

The Twelfth Doctor, upon awaking in the TARDIS, mentions "Sontarans perverting the course of human history" to Orson Pink, repeating his first words as the Fourth Doctor in Robot (1974–75). The line itself is a nod to the Third Doctor serial The Time Warrior (1973–74). There are similar nods to previous stories within the dialogue. The Twelfth Doctor states there is nothing to hear, "not a click or a tick" – a Third Doctor line from Death to the Daleks (1974). The episode's final line, whispered by Clara to the young Doctor, is "Fear makes companions of us all" – a line originally spoken by the First Doctor in the third episode of the very first Doctor Who serial, An Unearthly Child (1963).

Douglas Mackinnon found a photo of First Doctor actor William Hartnell as a child, and had the hair team style the actor playing the young Doctor to resemble him.

== Production ==
Steven Moffat discussed the episode in an interview, saying: "My impulse starting in that was just the idea, 'What does he do when he’s got nothing [to] do?' Because he’d throw himself off a building if he thought it’d be interesting on the way down ... he’s fascinated by anything. And here he’s with nothing to do, so he just goes out poking things with a stick until something bites it. And I think that’s quite interesting, isn't it? Sort of, there’s a thrill seeker aspect." In a Doctor Who Magazine interview, Moffat revealed that the episode originated with the decision, "I'm going to do a chamber piece, with no money, in the middle [of the eighth series], because I haven't done one in ages and I'd like to prove that I can actually write."

The read-through for the episode took place on 11 February 2014, with filming beginning on the 17th, and taking place at The Rest in Porthcawl. Filming continued at the Mimosa restaurant in Mermaid Quay, Cardiff Bay, on 24–25 February 2014. Filming also took place in Bute Park and Whitchurch, Cardiff. The actor portraying the child Doctor is left uncredited in the episode, but was later identified in Doctor Who Magazine as Michael Jones.

== Leak ==
As part of the series 8 leaks, "Listen" was one of five scripts to leak online from a BBC Worldwide server in Miami. This was followed on 23 August 2014 by the leak of the episode itself – missing automated dialogue replacement and visual effects. The leak followed similar leaks of the preceding episodes "Deep Breath", "Into the Dalek", and "Robot of Sherwood", and the following episode "Time Heist".

== Broadcast and reception ==
=== Broadcast ===
Overnight, the episode garnered 4.81 million viewers in the UK – a live audience share of 23.5%. Adjusted for non-live viewings, the episode was watched by a total of 7.01 million viewers, which led Doctor Who Magazine to tweet, nine days after broadcast, that in the UK, "Doctor Who: Listen was the seventh most watched TV show of the week, behind only Bake Off, Χ Factor (×2) & Corrie (×3).". In the United States, the original broadcast earned a total of 1.13 million viewers.

=== Critical reception ===
Professional ratings
Review scores
Source	Rating
The A.V. Club	A
SFX Magazine	4.5/5 stars
TV Fanatic	5/5 stars
CultBox	5/5 stars
IndieWire	A
IGN	7.1
New York Magazine	5/5 stars
Digital Spy	5/5 stars
The Daily Telegraph	5/5 stars
Daily Mirror	4/5 stars

"Listen" received critical acclaim from critics, with many praising Moffat's script, Mackinnon's direction, and the performances of Capaldi, Coleman and Anderson. The episode achieved an Appreciation Index of 82 out of a possible 100.

Labeling the episode as "possibly Steven Moffat's most terrifying episode to date", Neela Debnath of The Independent praised Coleman's performance, stating that "Clara was back on the top of her game". They called it "the most powerful episode of Doctor Who from Moffat to date ... a moving piece of drama as well as a terrifying piece of Saturday night television". Digital Spy praised the episode, awarding it a perfect 5 out of 5 and summing it up as "smart, scary [and] superb". They praised Moffat's script and the development of Clara's character, and closed their review by stating, "Intelligent, romantic and just scary enough, 'Listen' is either a moody tale of the supernatural or it's a clever reflection on the mind's own ability to fool and govern itself, but either way it's brilliant". Radio Times labelled the episode as "the most conceptual episode in the entire history of Doctor Who", and stated, "You're blowing our minds, Moffat". Writing for The Guardian, Dan Martin called the episode "phenomenally good", and suggested its script was one of Moffat's best ever.

The A.V. Club awarded the episode an "A" grade, calling it "the best episode in years" and saying that "[they] might run out of superlatives for this one". They stated that "it is the best story Steven Moffat has written for the show since 'The Eleventh Hour', and [that they] might be willing to go still further back than that in search of an episode of his that outdoes tonight's entry". They praised the analysis and development of the Doctor's character, and closed their review, saying, "'Listen' is just about the most honest exploration of the Doctor we've seen in 51 years. That it does all this without judgment, but rather with love and understanding, is what makes it special. It's what makes it Doctor Who." The Daily Mirror awarded the episode a 4 out of 5, stating, "Doctor Who should be about tapping into your fears, making you hide behind the cushion on the sofa. And 'Listen' delivers this in spades."

Mac Rogers of Slate praised "Listen" as "the best Doctor Who episode in years", arguing that it "proves that, deployed cleverly enough, Doctor Who can do anything." Similarly, writer Paul Cornell praised the episode's interrogation of the Doctor's character and inversion of series clichés, suggesting that it "might be the best Doctor Who story ever."

In 2015 the episode was nominated for a Bram Stoker Award, becoming the first Doctor Who episode to be nominated for the award. "Listen" was also nominated for the 2015 Hugo Award for Best Dramatic Presentation (Short Form).
