= You Have a Girlfriend, Alfie Atkins =

1985 children's book by Gunilla Bergström

- Author: Gunilla Bergström
- Original title: Alfons och Milla
- Translator: Joan Sandin
- Illustrator: Gunilla Bergström
- Cover artist: Gunilla Bergström
- Language: Swedish
- Series: Alfie Atkins
- Genre: children
- Published: 1985
- Publisher: Rabén & Sjögren
- Publication place: Sweden
- English publication date: 1988
- Preceded by: Lycklige Alfons Åberg (1984)
- Followed by: Kalas, Alfons Åberg! (1986)

You Have a Girlfriend, Alfie Atkins (Swedish: Alfons och Milla) is a 1985 children's book by Gunilla Bergström. As an episode of the animated TV series it originally aired over SVT on 18 March 1994. Translated by Joan Sandin, it was published in English in 1988.

== Plot ==
Alfons is playing with Viktor and Viktor's cousin Milla. They build a treehouse. When he doesn't play with Viktor, he plays with Milla. Together they plan to build a letterbox with aerial lift, allowing messages to be sent into the treehouse. Milla can bake cookies and create a theatre-circus with the Teddybears. She can also stand on one hand, and dares to jump from the garage roof near the parking lot. They think of a flag that can be raised and lowered.

One day at school, Alfons goes toileting when seeing a group of guys teasing him, writing that he plays with girls. For a while, he doesn't want to play with her but finally she still appears. Alfons ignore the ones who tease, and when the treehouse flag finally rises to the top, nobody teases him anymore.
