= Monster under the bed =

Childhood fear

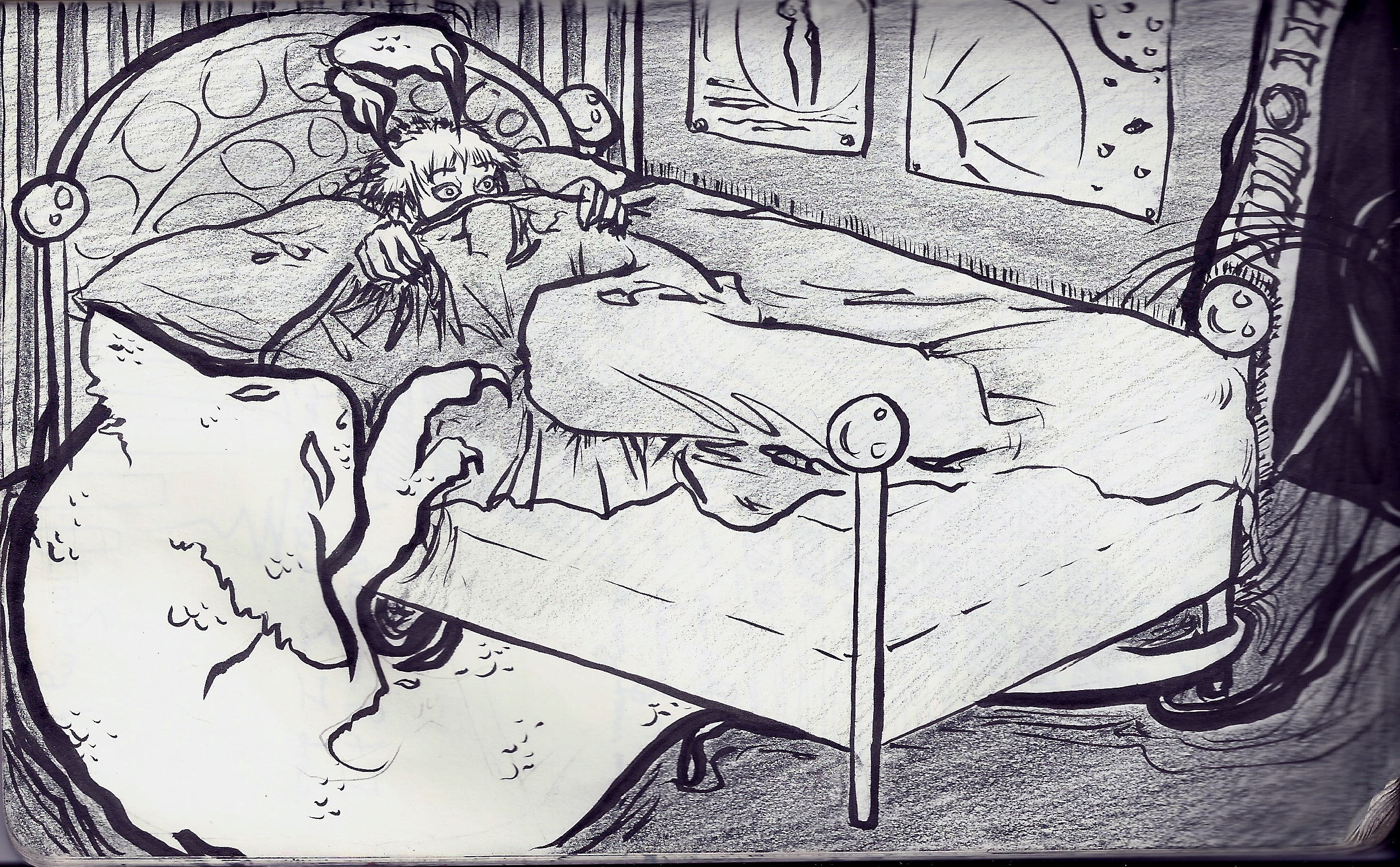
A monster under a person's bed

A common childhood phobia is the fear of a monster under the bed or similarly a monster in the closet, monster in the wardrobe, and monsters under the stairs. It is associated with the fear of the dark, the fear that there are monsters that cannot be seen due to the darkness.

== Origin ==
A theorised origin of the fear of monsters under the bed is that it may have evolved by human ancestors to avoid attacks by predators. Sexual size dimorphism of the human ancestor Australopithecus afarensis may have led females to sleep in trees and males to sleep on the ground, possibly leading females to anticipate attacks from below and males anticipating attacks from around them. A 2021 study interviewed boys and men and girls and women and found that males recalled monsters in their dreams beside them at higher rates than below them, but for females there was not much difference.

American psychologist Peter Gray suggests that the fear relates to the possibility of monsters hiding in "any place where you can't see", and that the connection to the bed in particular may arise from examples seen on television or in stories, saying that "I would imagine the basic fear is innate, but the specific forms of the fear would probably be influenced by experience".

== Monsters in popular culture ==
=== Bed ===
- The monster under the bed is in the 1978 children's book Is That a Monster, Alfie Atkins?
- The monster under the bed is in the 1987 children's book The Monster Bed.
- The 1989 fantasy comedy film Little Monsters has the child (Fred Savage) becoming a friend to a monster under the bed (Howie Mandel).
- The 1993 film The Nightmare Before Christmas featured a creature under the bed (voiced by Carmen Twillie) with sharp teeth and glowing eyes who was only seen during the musical number "This is Halloween".
- The Dinosaurs episode "Monster Under the Bed" had Baby Sinclair with a monster under the bed that turns out to be a Glyptodon-like creature whose burrow is under the Sinclair family's house. Ultimately, Baby comes up with a compromise to have the Sinclair house moved off the burrow.
- The 2014 Doctor Who episode "Listen" involves the fear of something grabbing one's foot when leaving bed.
- The 2025 American fantasy action film Dust Bunny detailed a monster under the bed that killed a girl's parents. It was depicted as a giant vicious rabbit creature.

=== Closet ===
- The 1987 horror film Monster in the Closet detailed a monster in the closet (performed by Kevin Peter Hall).
- The 2001 Pixar film Monsters, Inc. and its franchise has the screams of children are harvested as energy through doors that activate portals to children's bedroom closets in order to harvest their screams.

=== Stairs ===
- The 1993 film The Nightmare Before Christmas featured a creature under the stairs (voiced by Kerry Katz) who has a worm-like head, spider-like hair, snakes in place of fingers, and a wheeled platform in place of legs.

== See also ==
- Bogeyman
- Five Nights at Freddy's 4
