= Alfons och soldatpappan =

- Author: Gunilla Bergström
- Illustrator: Gunilla Bergström
- Cover artist: Gunilla Bergström
- Language: Swedish
- Series: Alfie Atkins
- Genre: children
- Published: 2006
- Publisher: Rabén & Sjögren
- Publication place: Sweden
- Preceded by: Hur långt når Alfons? (2002)
- Followed by: Alfons med styrkesäcken (2010)

Alfons och soldatpappan is a 2006 children's book by Gunilla Bergström.

== Plot ==
Alfons is six years old. With his new friend Hamdi they often play war. Hamdi's father has participated in a real war. Alfons and Hamdi want to hear stories, but Hamdi's father doesn't want to tell much.
