= Är du feg, Alfons Åberg? =

1981 children's book by Gunilla Bergström

- Author: Gunilla Bergström
- Illustrator: Gunilla Bergström
- Cover artist: Gunilla Bergström
- Language: Swedish
- Series: Alfie Atkins
- Genre: children
- Published: 1981
- Publisher: Rabén & Sjögren
- Publication place: Sweden
- Preceded by: Is that a Monster, Alfie Atkins? (1981)
- Followed by: Var är bus-Alfons? (1982)

Är du feg, Alfons Åberg? is a 1981 Swedish language children's book by Gunilla Bergström. As an episode of the animated TV series, it originally aired over SVT on 14 January 1981.

== Book cover ==
The book cover depicts Alfons running away from a fight behind a group of apartment blocks. In a ring, a group of children are fighting while other children watch.

== Plot ==
Alfons Åberg is six years old, and dislikes violence. He always walks away from a fight. But at kindergarten, he soon learns that he can't always do that. Instead, he gives up during a fight to avoid it, even though this causes the other children to believe he is weak. He is actually very strong for his age.

Alfons' father tells him that he needs to learn self-defense, and tries to teach him. Alfons doesn't want to, but obeys as to not make his father sad.

Alfons' grandmother likes Alfons' pacifist attitude, and thinks it makes Alfons especially kind. Alfons states he isn't more kind than other children, but he just doesn't like fighting.

Older people may quarrel at children fighting, and tell them to be friends instead of using violence. But then they watch TV crime fiction in the evening, and enjoys fighting and shooting Alfons also likes TV crime fiction, but not fighting himself.

When three new children begin kindergarten, they fight the entire first day, and all the second day. On the third day they try to start more fighting, now attacking Alfons. The other children tell them to stop because Alfons dislikes fighting. However, the troublemakers first believe it's just a trick. The other children tells Alfons to tell the truth, and Alfons finally gives up and says he dislikes fighting.

Alfons walks away to the tool-room and continues building a treehouse. The three other children would like to join him, and Alfons allows them if they don't fight. Nobody fights, and the treehouse is completed. Later at the toilet, Alfons hear two of the new children saying Alfons was brave to say he doesn't dare to fight.

At home that evening Alfons asks his father if he often used to fight when he was younger. As Alfons' father tells his son was afraid and didn't want to fight, Alfons says it was brave to tell that.
