= Lycklige Alfons Åberg =

1984 children's book by Gunilla Bergström

- Author: Gunilla Bergström
- Illustrator: Gunilla Bergström
- Cover artist: Gunilla Bergström
- Language: Swedish
- Series: Alfie Atkins
- Genre: children
- Published: 1984
- Publisher: Rabén & Sjögren
- Publication place: Sweden
- Preceded by: Is that a Monster, Alfie Atkins? (1984)
- Followed by: You Have a Girlfriend, Alfie Atkins (1985)

Lycklige Alfons Åberg ("Lucky Alfie Atkins") is a 1984 children's book by Gunilla Bergström. As an episode of the animated TV series it originally aired over SVT on 15 January 1981. It was originally called Klaga lagom, Alfons Åberg ("Stop complaining, Alfie Atkins").

== Plot ==
The story is set right after Christmas, as Alfons and his father are bored because Christmas is over. Alfons' friend Viktor is sick and can't play with Alfons. Alfons grandmother is visiting Alfons, and states it's good to be bored, waiting for something fun to happen. She removes the Christmas decorations. Suddenly, Viktor approaches. He's no longer sick and can play with Alfons again. No traditional Knut's dance is carried out, but the Christmas tree is thrown out from the balcony, and down towards the snow-covered January ground.
