= Alfie Atkins =

Fictional character created by the author Gunilla Bergström

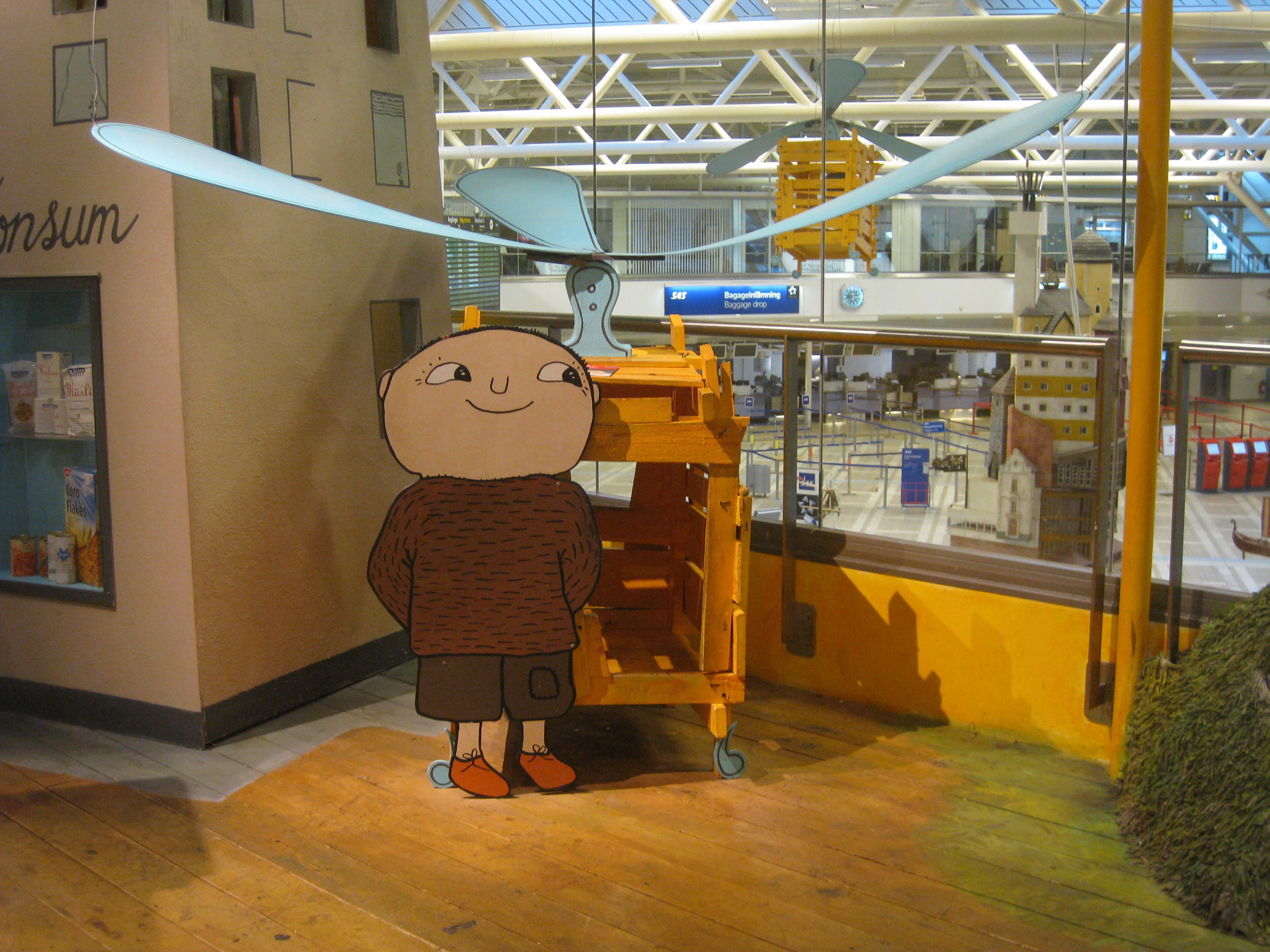
- Cutout of Alfie at Stockholm Arlanda Airport
- Author: Gunilla Bergström
- Original title: Alfons Åberg
- Illustrator: Gunilla Bergström
- Cover artist: Gunilla Bergström
- Country: Sweden
- Language: Swedish
- Genre: Children
- Publisher: Rabén & Sjögren, Julia MacRae Books
- Published: 1972–2012

Alfie Atkins (Swedish: Alfons Åberg) is a fictional character created by the author Gunilla Bergström from Sweden in 1972. He appears in books and animated cartoons.

== About ==
Alfie plays the role of a normal child, living with his father. During his younger years he had an imaginary friend named Malcolm (Mållgan in Swedish; Moggie in English TV version), that only Alfie could see. Later, he gets real friends such as Milla and Victor (Viktor). He also has a housecat named Puzzle (Pussel).

In the books, Alfie experiences many ordinary everyday events that kids can easily recognize. In his longing to grow up and be a big boy, Alfie often competes with his father on who can manage these events in the best way. Alfie's father is a nice and positive man. Women appear less frequently in the stories: Alfie has an aunt named Fifi (Fiffi) and a grandmother, but no mother is present.

The first book about Alfie, Goodnight, Alfie Atkins (Godnatt, Alfons Åberg), came out in 1972. There are 24 books in the Alfie series, along with seven other Alfie books for smaller children. The books have been translated into 29 different languages. The books are written and illustrated by Gunilla Bergström.

Alfie Atkins is named Alfons Åberg in Swedish and Danish, Willi Wiberg in German, Albert Åberg in Norwegian, Albert Albertson in Polish, Einar Áskell in Icelandic, Mikko Mallikas or Alfons Jokinen in Finnish, Ifan Bifan in Welsh, Eliyahu in Hebrew, Frančkov Fonzek in Slovenian and Alphonse Aubert in French.

The publishing company of the books is Rabén & Sjögren and Julia MacRae Books.

The last book was published in 2012, nine years before Gunilla Bergström died at the age of 79.

== Books ==
- Good Night, Alfie Atkins ("God natt, Alfons Åberg") - 1972
- Very Tricky, Alfie Atkins ("Aja baja, Alfons Åberg") - 1973
- Raska på, Alfons Åberg - 1975
- Alfie and His Secret Friend ("Alfons och hemlige Mållgan") - 1976
- Who'll Save Alfie Atkins? ("Vem räddar Alfons Åberg?") - 1976
- You're a Sly One, Alfie Atkins! ("Listigt, Alfons Åberg") - 1977
- Is that a Monster, Alfie Atkins? ("Alfons och odjuret") - 1978
- Är du feg, Alfons Åberg? - 1981
- Var är bus-Alfons? - 1982
- Who's Scaring Alfie Atkins? ("Vem spökar, Alfons Åberg?") - 1983
- Lycklige Alfons Åberg - 1984 (also known as "Klaga lagom, Alfons Åberg!")
- You Have a Girlfriend, Alfie Atkins ("Alfons och Milla") - 1985
- Kalas, Alfons Åberg! - 1986
- Hokus pokus, Alfons Åberg! - 1987
- Bara knyt, Alfons! - 1988
- Vad sa pappa Åberg? - 1989
- Där går Tjuv-Alfons! - 1991
- Mera monster, Alfons! - 1992
- Hurra för pappa Åberg! - 1993
- Näpp! sa Alfons Åberg - 1994
- Flyg! sa Alfons Åberg - 1997
- Osynligt med Alfons - 1998
- Hur långt når Alfons? - 2002
- Alfons och soldatpappan - 2006
- Alfons med styrkesäcken - 2010
- Skratta lagom! sa pappa Åberg - 2012

== Film ==
Starting in the late 1970s, a cartoon series was produced, containing adaptations of the books. The main director was Per Åhlin, the musical score was composed by Georg Riedel and the narration was provided by Björn Gustafson. The show was a co-production between Åhlin's company PennFilm, the Swedish Film Institute and the Nordic television channels SVT, NRK, DR and YLE. Between 1979 and 1982, thirteen episodes of approximately 10 minutes each were produced. In 1994, three additional shorts were produced.

== Animated feature and subsequent cartoon series (2010s) ==
In 2013, Norwegian director Torill Kove brought Alfie Atkins to cinemas with the feature presentation Hocus Pocus Alfie Atkins. It is based on the book of the same title with additions made for the sake of runtime. The film was followed by a new Alfie Atkins TV series of 13 episodes.
