= You're a Sly One, Alfie Atkins! =

Children's book by Gunilla Bergström published in 1977

You’re a Sly One, Alfie Atkins!
- Author: Gunilla Bergström
- Original title: Listigt Alfons Åberg!
- Translator: Robert Swindells
- Illustrator: Gunilla Bergström
- Cover artist: Gunilla Bergström
- Language: Swedish
- Series: Alfie Atkins
- Genre: children
- Published: 1977
- Publisher: Rabén & Sjögren
- Publication place: Sweden
- English publication date: 1979
- Preceded by: Who'll Save Alfie Atkins? (1976)
- Followed by: Is that a Monster, Alfie Atkins? (1978)

You’re a Sly One, Alfie Atkins! (Swedish: Listigt Alfons Åberg!) is a 1977 children's book by Gunilla Bergström. Translated by Robert Swindells, it was published in English in 1979. As an episode of the animated TV series it originally aired over SVT on 3 January 1980.

== Plot ==
Alfons, aged 4, visits his grandmother on his father's side. His cousins, aged 7 and 9, are also visiting. They have watches, know how to read, and think Alfons is too young to play with. The children's grandmother gives them cookies and suggests that they play a card game in the living room. The cousins don't allow Alfons to participate, citing that he's too young and doesn't understand anything.

Alfons is left all alone in the kitchen. He gets the idea to use a stool to reach the shelf where his grandmother keeps the cookies. Alfons feels sorry for himself, so he eats all the cookies except one.

When the card game is over, the cousins call Alfons into the living room to look at pictures with grandmother. After that, grandmother suggests they all have some juice and cookies. The cousins go into the kitchen to prepare the refreshments, but find to their horror that there's only one cookie left. They get very angry with Alfons. But Alfons makes himself as small as he can and says he didn't understand he wasn't supposed to eat the cookies. He says he's too young to understand anything, repeating the cousins' words back to them. They see that Alfons isn't so little after all and understands more than they thought. After that, they invite Alfons to play with them.
