= Gunilla Bergström =

Swedish author, journalist, and illustrator (1942–2021)

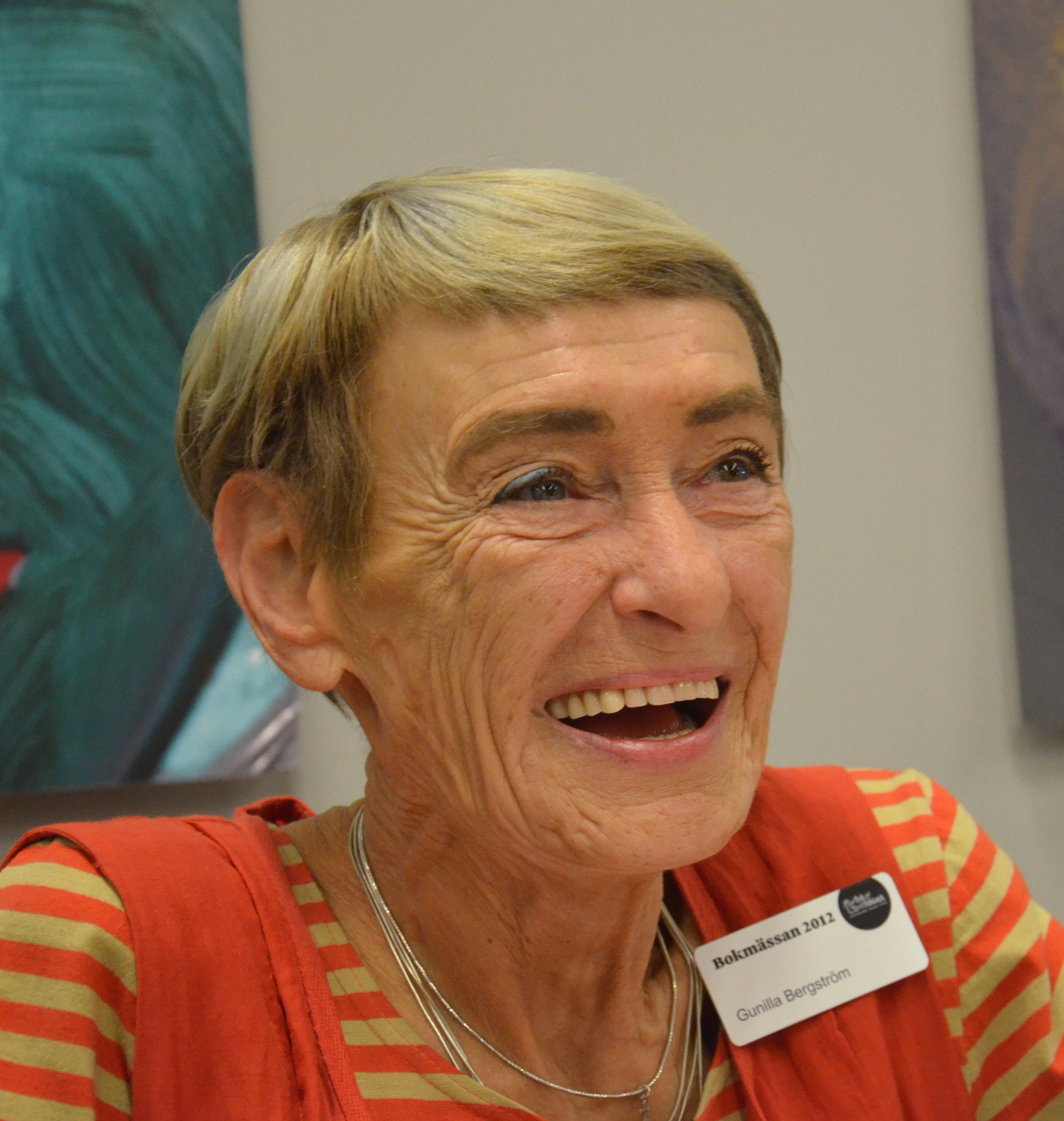
- Bergström during the 2012 Göteborg Book Fair
- Born: 3 July 1942; Gothenburg, Sweden
- Died: 23 August 2021 (aged 79); Stockholm, Sweden
- Occupations: Author, journalist, illustrator
- Writing career
- Period: 1960s–2021
- Notable work: Alfie Atkins book series

Gunilla Elisabet Dukure Bergström (3 July 1942 – 23 August 2021) was a Swedish author, journalist, and illustrator. She is best known for her series of children's books about the character Alfie Atkins (Swedish: Alfons Åberg), which she wrote and illustrated. Books about her character were translated into many languages, and some were adapted into film, television and theatre plays. She received several awards, including the royal Litteris et Artibus.

== Life and career ==
Born in Gothenburg, Bergström moved to Stockholm in 1966 to begin her career as a journalist. She worked for Swedish newspapers such as Aftonbladet and Dagens Nyheter. Bergström debuted as a children's book author in 1971, and released her first Alfie Atkins book in 1972. The character is a boy who lives with his single father. She has been a children's book author ever since, having released twenty-five Alfie books as of 2007. These books have been translated into 35 languages and have sold over eight million copies worldwide. Four million copies have been sold in Sweden alone. In 2006, her book Alfons och soldatpappan was released simultaneously in seven different languages; this had never happened before for a Swedish children's book.

Bergström has also written children's books about characters such as Milla, Bill, and Bolla. Bergström said she received the inspiration for her stories from everyday life. She was also interested in psychology and human behavior, and incorporated this into some of her books. Bergström described herself as a nit-picky person when it comes to writing. She illustrated her own books and often worked with collage.

Bergström ran her own company, Bok-Makaren (English: Book-Maker), which handles the licenses to the Alfie Atkins series, which have been granted for theatre productions and Alfie dolls, puzzles, and computer games. Bergström has commented that there is "nothing wrong with making commerce of famous things, but we are careful about who we sell licenses to."

As of 2007, Bergström was living in Stockholm with her West African husband. They spent their winters together in West Africa. Bergström was a grandmother. In 2012, she was awarded Illis Quorum by the Swedish Government.

Bergström died on 23 August 2021, almost two months after her 79th birthday.

== Awards ==
Her many awards have included:

- 1979 Elsa Beskow Plaque
- 1981 Astrid Lindgren Prize
- 2019 Litteris et Artibus

== Books ==
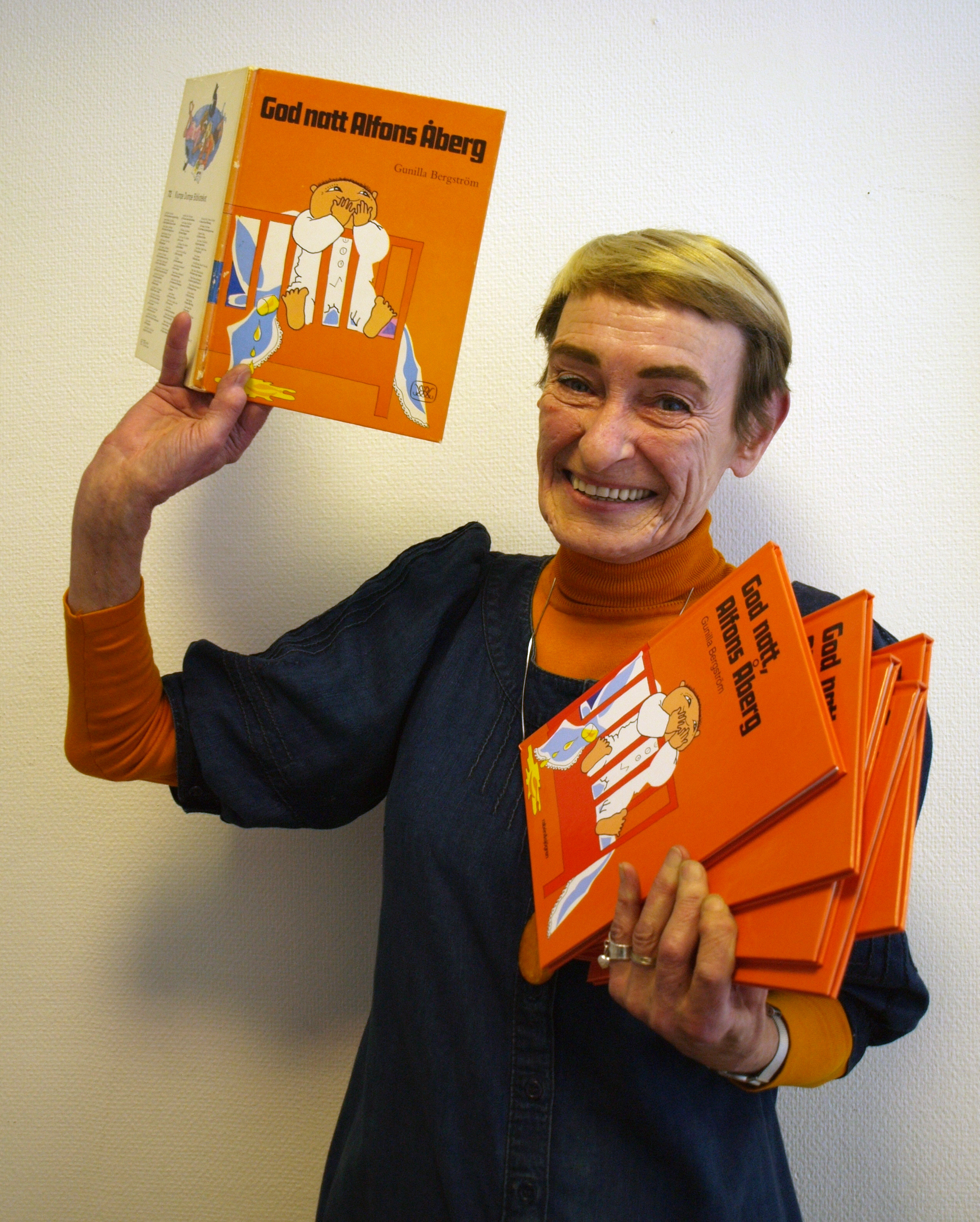
Bergström with some of her books (2010)

Bergström's books were published by Rabén & Sjögren, including:

- Mias pappa flyttar (1971)
- God natt, Alfons Åberg (Good Night, Alfie Atkins, 1972)
- Tjuven (1973)
- Aja baja, Alfons Åberg (Very Tricky, Alfie Atkins, 1973)
- Raska på, Alfons Åberg (Hurry Up, Alfie Atkins!, 1975)
- Alfons och hemlige Mållgan (Alfie and His Secret Friend, 1976)
- Vem räddar Alfons Åberg? (Who'll Save Alfie Atkins?, 1976)
- Listigt Alfons Åberg (You're a Sly One, Alfie Atkins!, 1977)
- Alfons och odjuret (Alfie and the Monster UK, Is that a Monster, Alfie Atkins? U.S., 1978)
- Ramsor & Tramsor om Bill och Bolla (1979)
- Tokigt & Klokigt, mera rim med Bill och Bolla (1980)
- Är du feg, Alfons Åberg? (Are You Chicken, Alfie Atkins, 1981)
- Var är bus-Alfons? (What’s Alfie up to Now?, 1982)
- Vem spökar Alfons Åberg? (Who's Scaring Alfie Atkins?, 1983)
- Lycklige Alfons Åberg (Happy Alfie Atkins, 1984)
- Alfons och Milla (You Have a Girlfriend, Alfie Atkins, 1985)
- Kalas, Alfons Åberg! (A Party, Alfie Atkins, 1986)
- Hokus pokus, Alfons Åberg! (Hocus-Pocus, Alfie Atkins, 1987)
- Bara knyt, Alfons! (Just Ty It, Alfie Atkins, 1988)
- Vad sa pappa Åberg? (What did Mr. Atkins Say?, 1989)
- Alfons egna saker (1990)
- Alfons tycker om (1990)
- Där går Tjuv-Alfons! (There Goes Alfie the Thief!, 1991)
- Milla mitt-i-natten (1991)
- Ingen sak sa Milla (1992)
- Mera monster, Alfons! (More Monsters, Alfie!, 1992)
- Alla möjliga Alfons (1992)
- Mera miner med Alfons (1992)
- Trall-fonsar. Visor med Alfons Åberg (1992)
- Hurra för pappa Åberg! (Three Cheers for Alfie’s Daddy!, 1993)
- Milla mitt-i-godiskriget (1993)
- Näpp! sa Alfons Åberg ("Not Likely!" Said Alfie Atkins, 1994)
- Lösgodis – fickan full (1994)
- Lösgodis – en påse till (1994)
- Titta – peka Alfons Åberg (1994)
- Flyg sa Alfons Åberg ("Fly With Me," Said Alfie Atkins, 1997)
- Osynligt med Alfons (Invisible with Alfie, 1998)
- Hurra för Alfons Åbergs far (1998)
- Hur långt når Alfons Åberg? (How Far Does Alfie Reach?, 2002)
- Alfons ABC (2002)
- Alfons och soldatpappan (Alfie and the Soldier Daddy, 2006)
- Alfons med styrke-säcken (Alfie Atkins with the Magic Sack, 2010)
- Skratta lagom! sa pappa Åberg (The Last to Laugh! Said, Alfie’s Dad, 2012)
- Julkalas, Alfons Åberg! (A Christmas Party, Alfie Atkins, 2025)
