= Nick Pelling =

British computer programmer

- Born: 1964 (age 61–62)
- Other name: Orlando M. Pilchard

Nick Pelling is a British-born computer programmer and investigative writer best known as the creator of the 1984 game Frak!.

== Games ==
=== Developed ===
==== As Aardvark Software ====
- Arcadians (1982) (unofficial version of Galaxian)
- Zalaga (1983) (unofficial version of Galaga)
- Frak! (1984)
- Firetrack (1987)
- Sharkey's 3D Pool (1989)
- 3D Pocket Pool (2001)

==== Independently ====
- Bangkok Knights (1987)
- Shinobi (1989)
- Loopz (1990)
- Terminator 2: Judgment Day (1993)
- The Simpsons: Bartman Meets Radioactive Man (1993)
- The Pagemaster (1994)
- Mortal Kombat II (1994)
- Wolverine: Adamantium Rage (1994)
- Primal Rage (1995)
- Batman Forever (1995)
- The X-Files Game (1999)
- In Cold Blood (2000)
- Street Fighter Alpha 3 (2002)
- Kelly Slater's Pro Surfer (2002)
- Championship Manager 5 (2005)
- Buzz!: The Music Quiz (2005)
- Buzz!: The BIG Quiz (2006)
- Buzz!: The Mega Quiz (2007)
- Buzz!: The Hollywood Quiz (2007)
- Soldiers of Fortune (2013)

=== Ported ===
==== As Aardvark Software ====
- Duke Nukem 3D (1997, PlayStation)

==== Independently ====
- Dandy (1986, Commodore 64) in the capacity of '11th hour Software Salvage'
- Teenage Mutant Ninja Turtles (1990, Commodore 64)
- Battle Master (1991, Sega Genesis)
- Wing Commander (1992, AmigaOS)
- Dangerous Streets & Wing Commander (1994, Amiga CD32)

== Interests in history ==
Pelling published an article in the British magazine History Today, supporting a previous attribution of the invention of the telescope to a Gerundian named Joan Roget in 1590, and published a 2006 book on the Voynich manuscript, claiming it was written by 15th century North Italian architect Antonio Averlino (also known as "Filarete").

== Books ==
- Pelling, Nicholas John (2006). The Curse of the Voynich: The Secret History of the World's Most Mysterious Manuscript. Compelling Press. ISBN 0-9553160-0-6.
