= Buzz!: The Mega Quiz =

2007 video game

- PAL box art
- Developer: Relentless Software
- Publisher: Sony Computer Entertainment
- Series: Buzz!
- Platform: PlayStation 2
- Release: EU: 27 April 2007; NA: 30 October 2007
- Genre: Party
- Modes: Single-player, multiplayer

Buzz!: The Mega Quiz is a 2007 party video game developed by Relentless Software and published by Sony Computer Entertainment for the PlayStation 2. It is the fourth instalment in the Buzz! series. Buzz! The Mega Quiz has over 5,000 questions. Along with Buzz! Junior: Jungle Party, this was one of the first Buzz games released in North America, also the first game in the series to have a 12+ rating by PEGI.

== Rounds ==
=== Multiplayer Rounds ===
==== Point Picker ====
Similar to the opening Point Builder round in the other Buzz! games, except players can choose the question topic.

==== Winner Stays On ====
In this round a question is asked and two pictures are shown. Once all the players have answered, those who answered the question incorrectly are eliminated and the others are given points. This repeats until the questions have been asked four times or one or fewer players remain.

==== Fastest Finger ====
Exactly the same as the namesake round in other Buzz! games. Players are given a question and the fastest player who gets it right, gets the most points. Second, third, and fourth places get fewer points. No points can be lost in this round. The second half of the round focusses entirely on music questions.

==== Pie Fight ====
Similar to Hitman in Buzz!: The Big Quiz. Answering a question correctly first gives the player a chance to throw a pie at a fellow contestant. Players can take two hits before they're out, the last one standing wins 1000 points.

==== Mystery Challenge ====
Halfway through the game a mystery challenge comes on. It is a random selection from several games. These include horse racing, where players simply choose one of the four horses to win a race, the result of which is random; duck shoot, where 4 rows of ducks are to be "shot" using the 4 coloured buttons on the controller; and "Find the Lady", where 3 cards are dealt then quickly shuffled and players have to keep track of the Queen card. Another game is "Fact or Fiction", where the host reads a statement and the players must choose if the statement is True (Fact) or False (Fiction).

==== Globetrotter ====
Is a similar round to Buzz!'s world of sport in Buzz!: The Sports Quiz. The first player to answer the question correctly gets to pick the location they want to go to for the next question.

==== Top Rank ====
Players are asked a question and then asked to press down the buttons in the right sequence to get the question right. This round is similar to Who Wants to be A Millionaire's Fastest Finger round, except there are no additional points for the first to answer correctly.

==== Point Stealer ====
In this round, buzzing in and answering the question correctly first gives the player a chance to steal points from an opponent of their choice.

==== Final Countdown ====
Buzz takes all of the players' points and converts them into time. The higher the score, the more time a player will start this round with. Players then continue to answer questions until only one player remains. This player is then declared the winner.

As soon as the question is read, the time column starts going low. Players are required to answer questions as quickly as possible. Whenever the player gets a question wrong, they lose a chunk of their time. If the player answers a question correctly, they can stop their time until the next question. The fastest player to answer correctly also receives bonus time. Once the player's time column repletes completely, they're eliminated.

=== Single Player Rounds ===
==== Time Builder ====
In this round the player has 10 seconds to answer a question. If the player answers correctly, the remaining time will go towards use in the Hotseat. If the player answers incorrectly, they will receive no time at all.

==== Hotseat ====
Using the time earned in Time Builder, the player must answer questions. If answered correctly, the player will climb a point ladder.

==== Banking Points ====
Similar to The Weakest Link, In the Hotseat when the player climbs the ladder they can either press the buzzer to bank the points, or continue, giving the player more than double the previous number on the ladder. If the player however gets a wrong answer with points on the ladder, they will lose those points.

== Reception ==
Rob Fahey in Eurogamer praised the quality and difficulty level of the questions, and the game rounds, except for the mystery rounds which he felt were random with their awarding of points and weren't much fun. Other than that he said that the balancing of the rounds and questions was arguably close to perfection and scored it as 9/10. Aaron Thomas from GameSpot liked the way the game isn't just a race to see who can regurgitate a memorised answer quickly, but actually forces you to use knowledge in different ways and scored the game as 7.5/10.
