= Buzz! =

- The logo of the Buzz! series
- Genre: Quiz
- Developers: Relentless Software; Kuju Entertainment; Curve Studios
- Publisher: Sony Computer Entertainment
- Creator: Stewart Jones
- Platforms: PlayStation 2, PlayStation 3, PlayStation Portable
- First release: Buzz!: The Music Quiz; October 2005
- Latest release: Buzz!: The Ultimate Music Quiz; October 2010
- Spin-offs: Buzz! Junior

Buzz! is a series of video games developed by Relentless Software and published by Sony Computer Entertainment for the PlayStation 2, PlayStation 3 and PlayStation Portable consoles. It was conceptualized by restaurant owner Stewart Jones, who sold the concept to Sony.

They are quiz games that see the players answering trivia questions while competing in the fictional game show Buzz!. Created specifically with multi-player party gaming in mind, the series launched in October 2005 and to date comprises 18 games; including 13 in the Buzz! series and five Buzz! Junior titles. The series made the transition to the PlayStation 3 with Buzz!: Quiz TV in 2008.

In 2006 the second game in the Buzz! series, Buzz!: The BIG Quiz, won the BAFTA award for Best Casual and Social game. Buzz!: Quiz TV has been nominated in the Best Social Game and Best Multiplayer Game categories for the 2009 BAFTA video game awards. The series has sold over 10 million copies.

As with most TV quiz shows the winner of the game is the player with the most points. The show uses a multi-round format with most games in the series featuring eight individual rounds. The exact rounds vary from game-to-game and more information about the rounds can be found in the individual articles. Each game is hosted by the titular Buzz (voiced by Jason Donovan in the English versions).

The games are played with buzzers – a set of four simple controllers that consist of four coloured answer buttons and a red buzzer. These are intended to replicate the buzzers often seen on TV quiz shows. The buzzers plug into a USB port and the game allows use of either one or two sets of buzzers allowing up to eight players in certain games. The games are usually marketed in two versions, a pack containing both game and buzzers for new purchasers or a game only version for players who already own a set of buzzers.

In January 2008 California-based Buzztime Entertainment filed a legal suit, in the Southern District of California, against Sony Computer Entertainment Europe alleging that Sony had violated several of its trademarks. The suit accused Sony of a "malicious, fraudulent, knowing, wilful, and deliberate" violation of its trademarks. In the suit Buzztime sought the recall and destruction of all infringing products and asked the court for actual damages, punitive damages, legal fees and an order to the US Patent and Trademark Office not to register Sony's pending Buzz trademarks. The case was eventually settled out of court in favour of Sony.

== Buzz! series ==
Cover of Buzz! The Music Quiz, the first game in the Buzz! series, showing the quiz master Buzz holding one of the buzzers designed specifically for the game series.

The series was launched in October 2005 with Buzz!: The Music Quiz, which was followed by a general knowledge version Buzz!: The BIG Quiz. The alternation between specialist subject and general knowledge continued for the next three games in the series; the sports based Buzz!: The Sports Quiz was followed by another general knowledge edition, Buzz!: The Mega Quiz, and then another single subject edition based around films, Buzz!: The Hollywood Quiz. The sequence was broken with the March 2008 release of Buzz!: The Pop Quiz.

Buzz!: Quiz TV is a general knowledge quiz but allows players the option of quizzes on a single specific subject. Buzz!: Master Quiz is a general knowledge quiz with the addition of single subject rounds. In 2009 Buzz!: Quiz World, expanded on Quiz TV by adding profiles to remember player's character & buzzer sounds, if players won or lost the previous game and call them by name. Quiz World includes both a PS3 & PSP version of the game. Buzz!: Quiz Player is a free downloadable game, and is essentially a stripped down version of Quiz World. Quiz Player is primarily designed to be played with the PS3 downloadable quiz packs, and can be played with the buzzers or with a DualShock 3 controller

== Buzz! Junior series ==
Cover of Buzz! Junior: Jungle Party, the first game in the Buzz! Junior series

In October 2006 a spin-off series of games designed for children started with the release of Buzz! Junior: Jungle Party with 40 mini games (but 25 in The United States version). The second game, Buzz! Junior: Robo Jam, was released in May 2007, was the first game to be created by Cohort Studios for both PlayStation 2 & PlayStation 3, and has 25 mini games (but 24 in North America). Buzz! Junior: Robo Jam uses robots as players. Then, a third, Buzz! Junior: Monster Rumble was released in November 2007 and has 25 mini games. The fourth game in the series, Buzz! Junior: Dino Den, is based around dinosaurs and was the second Buzz game to be developed by Cohort Studios and released in February 2008. The fifth Buzz! Junior game, Buzz! Junior: Ace Racers, again developed by Cohort Studios, was released in October 2008.

Buzz! Junior: Ace Racers is a racing game where players race cars, boats and planes using their Buzz! buzzer. All the games in the Buzz! Junior series have been developed by Magenta Software, FreeStyleGames, and Cohort Studios.

== Buzz! buzzers ==
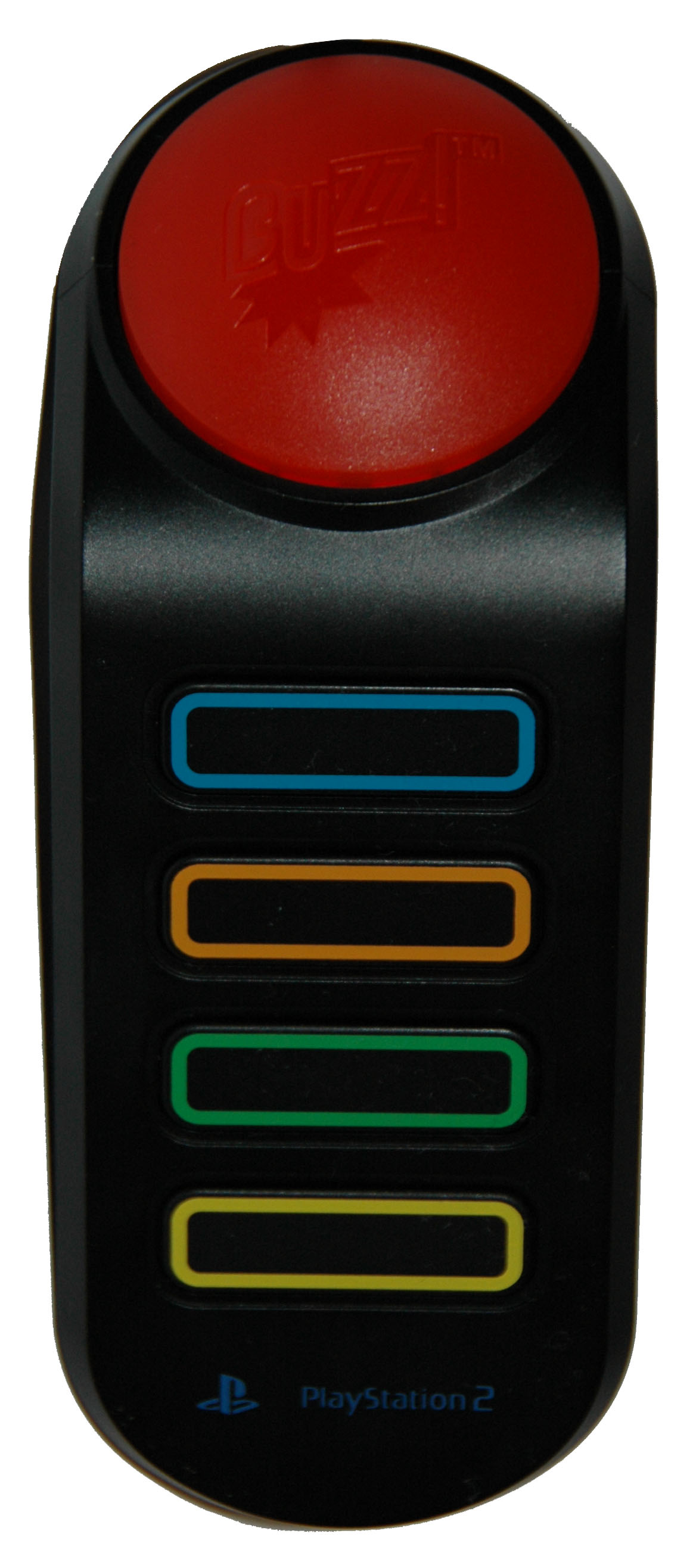
A Buzz! buzzer

The Buzz! Buzzer is a special controller designed specifically for the Buzz! game series. The controller handset has a large red buzzer button and four smaller coloured buttons for selecting the answer from the on-screen options. The buzzer set is a USB device, and connects to the USB ports on the PlayStation 2 and PlayStation 3.

Buzz!: Quiz TV saw the release of a wireless version of the buzzers. They connect to the PS2 or PS3 system via a USB dongle. Each dongle can support up to four wireless buzzers so this means another dongle is required for 8 player play with eight wireless buzzers. The wireless buzzers can be used with both the PlayStation 2 and PlayStation 3 and all previous Buzz! games.

== Games ==
=== Buzz! series ===
Game	Details
Buzz!: The Music Quiz Original release date(s): EU: 21 October 2005	Release years by system: 2005– PlayStation 2
Buzz!: The BIG Quiz Original release date(s): EU: 17 March 2006	Release years by system: 2006– PlayStation 2
Buzz!: The Sports Quiz Original release date(s): EU: 10 November 2006; AU: 16 November 2006	Release years by system: 2006– PlayStation 2
Buzz!: The Mega Quiz Original release date(s): EU: 27 April 2007; NA: 30 October 2007	Release years by system: 2007– PlayStation 2
Buzz!: The Hollywood Quiz Original release date(s): EU: 19 October 2007; AU: 25 October 2007; NA: 11 March 2008	Release years by system: 2007– PlayStation 2
Buzz!: The Schools Quiz Original release date(s): EU: 11 January 2008	Release years by system: 2008– PlayStation 2
Buzz!: The Pop Quiz Original release date(s): EU: 14 March 2008; AU: 15 May 2008	Release years by system: 2008– PlayStation 2
Buzz!: Quiz TV Original release date(s): AU: 3 July 2008; EU: 4 July 2008; NA: 23 September 2008	Release years by system: 2008– PlayStation 3
Buzz!: Master Quiz Original release date(s): EU: 25 July 2008; AU: 31 July 2008; NA: 23 September 2008	Release years by system: 2008– PlayStation Portable
Buzz!: Brain Bender Original release date(s): EU: 28 November 2008; AU: 4 December 2008	Release years by system: 2008– PlayStation Portable
Buzz!: Brain of... Original release date(s): AU: 26 March 2009; EU: 27 March 2009	Release years by system: 2009– PlayStation 2, PlayStation 3, PlayStation Portable
Buzz!: Quiz World Original release date(s): EU: 30 October 2009; AU: 5 November 2009; NA: 10 November 2009	Release years by system: 2009– PlayStation 3, PlayStation Portable
Buzz!: The Ultimate Music Quiz Original release date(s): EU: 22 October 2010	Release years by system: 2010– PlayStation 3; 2011– PlayStation Portable
Buzz!: Quiz Player Original release date(s): NA: 21 December 2010	Release years by system: 2010– PlayStation 3
Buzz!: Quiz Player Original release date(s): NA: 21 December 2010	Notes: Free downloadable game on PlayStation Network that includes 90 questions in its sample pack.; Several question packs were subsequently available through in-game purchase.; Contains two modes: single player and local multiplayer for up to four players.; Support for DualShock 3 controllers.; Features a Facebook implementation, which was used to publish the game results for all of the account's friends.

=== Buzz! Junior series ===
Year	Title	Following Platform		
Year	Title	PlayStation 2	PlayStation 3	PlayStation Portable
2006	Buzz! Junior: Jungle Party	check	check	check
2007	Buzz! Junior: Robo Jam	check	check	
2007	Buzz! Junior: Monster Rumble	check	check	
2008	Buzz! Junior: Dino Den	check	check	
2008	Buzz! Junior: Ace Racers	check		

=== Other versions ===
Pack shot of Who Wants to Be a Millionaire? – Party Edition, the first third party game to use Buzz! buzzers

On 24 November 2006, Eidos released Who Wants to Be a Millionaire? – Party Edition. This was the first third party game to support the use of Buzz! buzzers. The game features a single player game closely modeled on the original UK version of the TV show and a multi-player version with various modes, such as Multi-Millionaire where players take turns answering questions, with elimination being the penalty for a wrong answer. The winner is the last player left standing. Millionaire Party allows players to steal questions from rivals.

On 7 November 2008, Disney Interactive Studios released Disney Think Fast for the PlayStation 2. The game came in a box with four Buzz controllers without the Buzz branding.

=== PlayStation Home ===
Relentless Software released a Buzz! themed space for the PlayStation 3's online social gaming network, PlayStation Home in the European and North American versions. The space is called "Buzz!: HQ". Buzz!: HQ is a lounge with seats for the user's avatars. It includes "Buzz!: Studio", a "64 Player Buzz! Quizzing" where players can win T-shirts for their avatars. There are four categories to choose from which change each game and a series of eight questions for each category. To answer the question correctly, the user must stand on the colored area that represents the correct answer. The original release date was 4 June 2009. Due to some technical problems of the Buzz!: Studio, the space was removed for fixing. The relaunch of the space happened on 16 July 2009. Another unique feature about the space is that the quizzes used for Buzz!: Studio are quizzes made by PlayStation Network users who have submitted their quiz via the MyBuzz! website.

As of 10 September 2009, Buzz!: Quiz TV fully supports game launching. Game launching is a feature that allows users to set up multi-player games in Home and launch directly into the game from Home. Buzz!: Quiz World supports PlayStation Home rewards by winning the quiz rounds in the game.

From 27 August 2009 to 24 September 2009, an event for Buzz! took place in a special PlayStation Events Space. The event was called the "Buzz! Tomato Challenge" and used the space, Events Landing. Exclusive footage from the Buzz! World Championships grand final at La Tomatina festival in Spain was shown during the event. Users were able to take part in a virtual version of the real world event via the Buzz! Tomato Challenge pod in the re-dressed Events Landing. Users threw tomatoes at the enormous Buzz by answering quiz questions correctly. If they successfully hit Buzz ten times within the time limit, they were rewarded a Buzz! Tomato Head for their avatar. This event was only available to the European Home.

=== Cameos ===
Pain – Buzz is a downloadable add-on characters for the game, and he has 2 different costumes to wear.

LittleBigPlanet – Buzz is an add-on costume for the game's Sackboy character. It features a Buzz skin (for his red suit), Buzz hair, Buzz glasses, and a Buzz tie.

PlayStation All-Stars Battle Royale – Buzz is featured in the PlayStation All-Stars Battle Royale level, Dreamscape, based on LittleBigPlanet which eventually gets invaded by Buzz!. As the level progresses Buzz appears standing in the background. Buzz occasionally asks questions about PlayStation Trivia with the four answers being split up and attached onto four platforms on the level on which players must stand to indicate their choice, an incorrect answer results in a punishment such as a Cream-pie being thrown at the incorrect players.

Astro's Playroom – The Buzz peripheral is featured as an unlockable item for the 'Labo' room, an area used to display digital collectables from PlayStation's history. The Buzz collectible is unlocked by finding it hidden within the SSD Speedway level.

Astro Bot – A V.I.P. Bot wearing a Buzz outfit can be rescued from the level 'Shocking Behavior'. The bot is referred to as Quiz Master in-game. A Buzz! Buzzer (referred to as Trivia Testers) can be won inside the 'Gatcha Lab' and given to the Buzz V.I.P. Bot once awarded.
