= Guitar Hero Live =

2015 video game

- Developer: FreeStyleGames
- Publisher: Activision
- Series: Guitar Hero
- Platforms: PlayStation 3 PlayStation 4 Wii U Xbox 360; Xbox One iOS
- Release: NA: 20 October 2015; AU: 20 October 2015; EU: 23 October 2015
- Genre: Rhythm
- Modes: Single-player, multiplayer

Guitar Hero Live is a 2015 rhythm game developed by FreeStyleGames and published by Activision. It is the seventh main instalment, the twelfth overall instalment in the Guitar Hero series, and serves as a reboot of the Guitar Hero franchise, being the first new entry in the series since Warriors of Rock in 2010. The game was released for PlayStation 3, PlayStation 4, Wii U, Xbox 360, and Xbox One in October 2015. As with previous games in the series, the goal is to use a special guitar controller to match fret patterns displayed on a scrolling note pattern on screen in time with the music.

Activision wanted to bring back Guitar Hero for the next generation of video game consoles but wanted the new game to be innovative. These innovations included a new guitar controller featuring a six button, three-fret layout in contrast to the 5 button controller of previous games. The game featured two main modes; GH Live, the games career mode, featured the note pattern displayed atop full motion video taken from the perspective of a lead guitarist during a concert, with the crowd and other band members dynamically reacting to the player's performance. In the other main mode, GHTV, songs are presented with the note track overlaid atop their music video or from live concert footage. The mode also allows players to pick up and play currently-streamed songs at any time or use money and in-game credits to play any song within the library, forgoing traditional downloadable content. The game was shipped with forty-two songs on disc and 200 songs within the GHTV library; new content has been added to GHTV on a weekly basis, provided through premium shows that earn players unique rewards.

Guitar Hero Live was released to mostly positive reception, with critics praising the new controller design for providing trickier and more realistic gameplay in comparison to previous Guitar Hero games, as well as the wider variety of content available via the GHTV mode. The main Live portion of the game received mixed reviews, with criticism towards its weak soundtrack, lack of multiplayer and the live action videos. The GHTV mode also received mixed reception for its reliance on microtransactions, and the inability to permanently purchase songs to own.

Due to the game's underwhelming sales and reception, Activision laid off many employees of FreeStyleGames and sold the company to Ubisoft in 2017, where it continued. The GHTV mode was shut down on 1 December 2018, reducing the available Guitar Hero songs from 484 to the 42 present on-disc.

== Gameplay ==
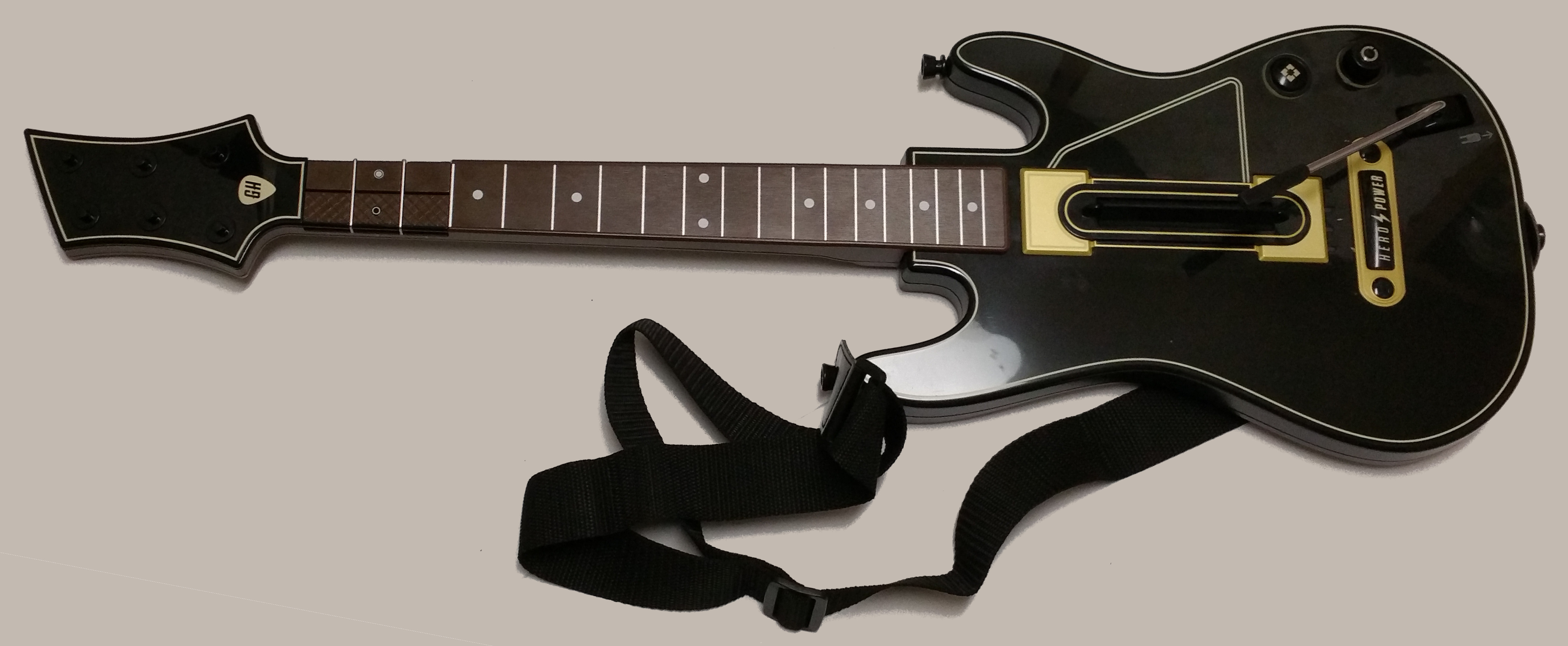
The updated Guitar Hero Live controller uses a 2 × 3 button fret system in contrast to previous games that uses a 1 × 5 button scheme

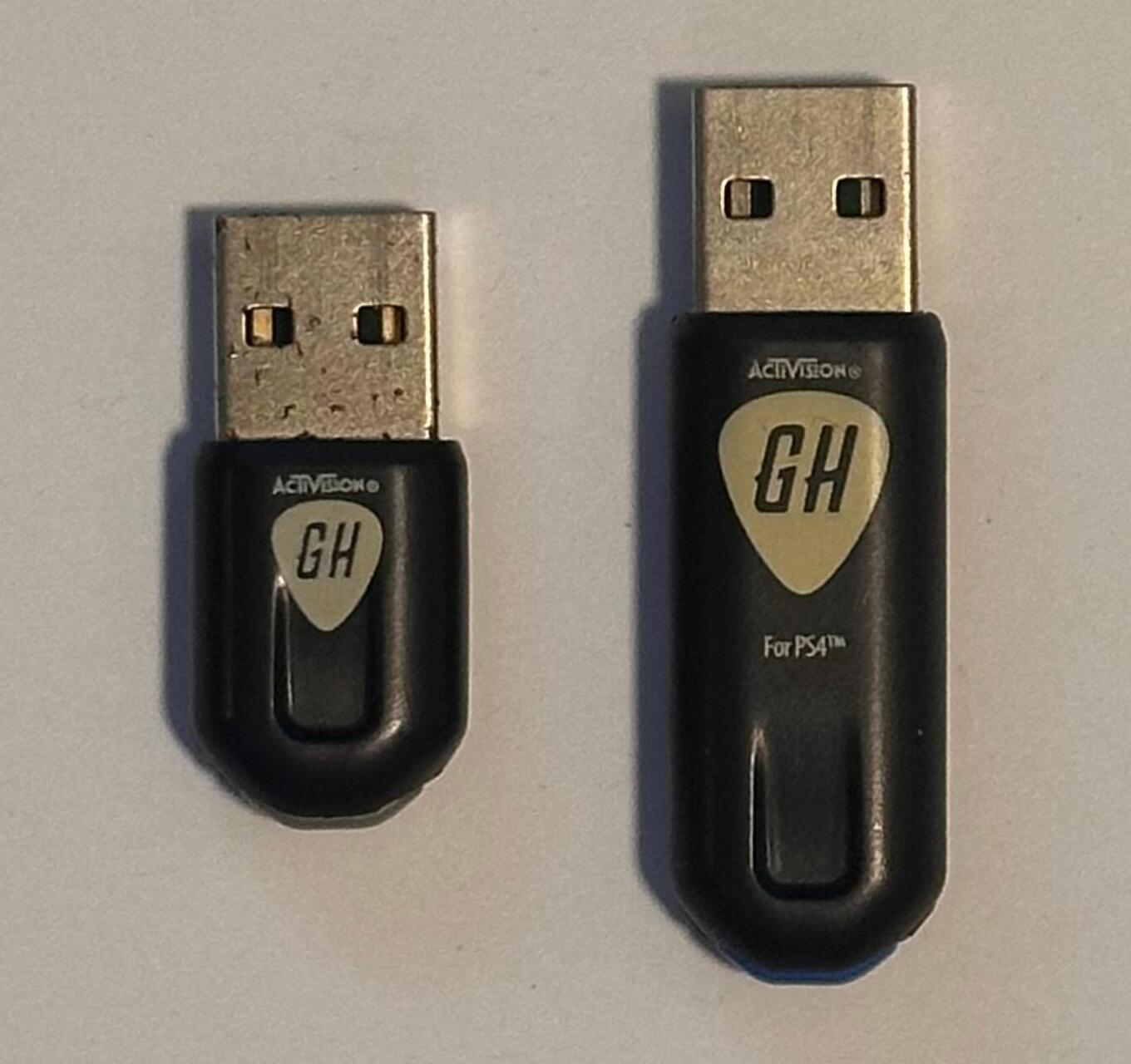
USB dongle used to connect the guitar with the console. On the left, PlayStation 3; on the right, PlayStation 4 versions

Guitar Hero Live follows similar gameplay to previous installments in the series, requiring players to use a guitar-shaped controller with buttons and a strum bar to match notes on a scrolling "highway" corresponding to notes played in a song. In contrast to the previous five-button design, the Guitar Hero Live controller features six buttons arranged into two rows of three. The frets are represented by a "note highway", three scrolling lanes on-screen, containing either black or white notes representing the two rows. Lower difficulty levels use one row of buttons, while higher difficulties may include "chords" that use a combination of buttons from both rows. The game typically maps out power chords to use the top row of buttons, while modifications of those chords include others from the bottom row. Notes may be held and sustained, indicated by trailing lines after the note markers, during which the player can use the guitar's whammy bar to alter the held note's pitch for effect. Fast-moving sections of songs may employ the use of hammer-on and pull-off notes, marked with a special outline, which can be played without using the strum bar. The game also retains the concept of open strumming introduced in previous Guitar Hero titles, represented as a horizontal bar across the lanes and requiring the player to hit the strum bar without pressing any fret keys. The player is able to select one of four difficulty levels which affect the number and complexity of the note patterns they have to hit, and the speed at which the on-screen display scrolls. Guitar Hero Live can also be played by two players, both playing on separate guitar controllers with split-screen separate note highways, competing for the better score. Songs in GH Live mode (below) also includes vocals, allowing players to sing along in tone with the song's lyrics using a connected microphone.

The game is playable via an app on iOS mobile devices, including the fourth-generation Apple TV. This version supports both "touch" mode and support for an optional Bluetooth-enabled guitar controller that provides "[the] full game in an uncompromised way" according to Activision. When in touch mode, the note display geared towards the 6-button controller is replaced with four touch-screen buttons but otherwise retains the same gameplay; with the controller, the game otherwise plays the same. Due to the size of the game relative to storage space on most mobile devices, Guitar Hero Live on iOS units requires a persistent Internet connection as all songs, including those that are normally part of the console on-disc soundtrack, are streamed from Activision's servers when played.

The guitar connects to the console via a supplied USB dongle. The USB dongle needs to match the game version, the PlayStation 3 dongle won't work on PlayStation 4 console and vice versa. The same guitar is compatible with both platforms, as well as Xbox, but not the iOS version.

=== GH Live ===
Guitar Hero Live utilizes a new presentation style incorporating live-action footage from the perspective of the guitarist, rather than 3D stages and characters.

In the game's primary single-player mode, titled GH Live within the game, the player completes songs while experiencing full-motion video taken from the first-person perspective of a band's lead guitarist. The video includes shots of the audience and the band members. As the player performs the songs, the audience responds positively to good performances when few mistakes are made. If the player makes several mistakes in a row, the audience will become critical and start to jeer at the performer. To win back the crowd, the player can either match more notes correctly, or can use collected Hero Power to rapidly regain their interest. Hero Power, replacing Star Power from previous Guitar Hero games, is collected by correctly playing marked series of notes on the track; Hero Power can be accumulated, marked as on-screen guitar picks next to the track, to be used at later times. The player can release Hero Power for a limited time by either tilting the guitar controller upward or hitting a special button on the controller.

The career mode is broken up into a dozen-some show sets, each set consisting of about 3–5 songs. The video for each set includes the band's introduction, banter between the band and crowd between songs, and final ovations on conclusion of the show. The player must unlock each set in order as to move forward. Once a set is complete, the player is shown the game's ranking of their performance and for each song, based on factors such as percentage of notes hit correctly, the longest streak of properly played consecutive notes, and how long they kept the virtual crowd excited about their performance. The player then unlocks the ability to play the individual songs outside of sets.

=== GHTV ===
In addition to songs that were shipped on disc, additional songs were introduced to the game through Guitar Hero TV (GHTV). On starting GHTV mode, the player was given a choice of a number of themed channels, which broadcast playable songs curated programs on a rotating schedule similar to a radio broadcast. One such channel always presented new songs that had been added to GHTV. Songs in GHTV were played over the music video for the song or live concert footage of the band playing the song, instead of the custom visuals for the main single player game. The player could pick up and play on any song that was shown, but was also able to use earned Plays to replay a specific song outside of the channel's rotation.

While playing in GHTV, the player was scored to track their performance, and their scores were compared to other players - both those playing at the same time as well as asynchronous scores from other players. To help boost their score, players could accumulate Hero Power in the same fashion as in the GH Live mode. Prior to a song, the player could choose to use Coins, the in-game currency, to purchase one of several Hero Powers which they could deploy during the song, improving their score and performance. Hero Powers included temporary boosts in scoring multipliers, ability to clear all notes for a short distance on the track, or to increase or decrease the density of notes. When a song was complete, the player was ranked based on their performance with the other tracked players, and awarded experience points, Coins, and other bonuses. Experience points are used to raise the player's rank in the GHTV metagame, allowing them to unlock player card skins and other features of GHTV, including Play tokens. Alternatively, players can use the paid, microtransaction currency Hero Cash to purchase access to content. In an update in December 2015, players on GHTV had an opportunity to be randomly pitted in a head-to-head challenge against another player of similar skill level, about twice every half-hour. Winning this head-to-head challenge could give the player an experience point boost.

New songs to GHTV were typically introduced via limited-time "Premium Shows", which ran for a week or more; these songs were then moved into the on-demand catalog and later into the normal GHTV rotation. Access to Premium Shows could be purchased with Hero Cash, or by completing several specific songs in either on-demand or on rotation play. Within the Premium Shows, players competed in the same manner as with normal GHTV songs and could earn unique in-game rewards, such as coins or alternate skins for the on-screen note "highway".

Players could purchase a "Party Pass" that allowed full access to all of GHTV's on-demand songs and paid features for 24 hours, a mode that FreeStyleGames envisioned to be used when players are hosting large parties or similar events. As first held on the weekend of 6 November 2015, Activision could offer promotional periods that similarly offer full access.

In addition to regular content, GHTV was used to provide specialty programming. GHTV offered curated music video shows with host segments wrapped around playable songs; the first such show features songs selected by the band Avenged Sevenfold and included commentary by the band on these selections. Def Leppard used GHTV to premiere their new music video for their single "Dangerous" in January 2016. Activision offered a contest for players to win prizes by participating in a special "Shred-a-Thon" premium show, highlighting the addition of DragonForce's "Through the Fire and Flames"—one of the most notoriously difficult songs that has appeared in other Guitar Hero titles—to the GHTV setlist.

Activision announced in June 2018 that the GHTV servers will be shut down on 1 December 2018, rendering this functionality unusable. Players will still be able to play songs on disc. The iOS app was also delisted as its functionality would also cease with the shut down of the GHTV servers.

== Soundtrack ==
The on-disc soundtrack of Guitar Hero Live includes 42 songs and spans across a diverse selection of genres, the developers recognizing that challenging guitar tracks are not strictly limited to rock music. The game's soundtrack include songs by The Black Keys, Blitz Kids, Ed Sheeran, Fall Out Boy, Gary Clark Jr., Green Day, The Killers, The Lumineers, My Chemical Romance, Pierce the Veil, The Rolling Stones, Skrillex, and The War on Drugs.

Pre-orders of the game offered access to a time-limited premium show featuring three live recordings by Avenged Sevenfold, including "Shepherd of Fire", "Buried Alive" and "Nightmare", filmed from their performances at the Download Festival in England and Mexico City.

Additional songs are provided through GHTV. Two hundred songs were playable on GHTV at launch, and the developers plan on adding new songs to GHTV on a regular basis. There is no backward compatibility with songs or controllers from previous editions of the franchise; FreeStyleGames' developer Jamie Jackson justified the decision, explaining that Guitar Hero Live was a "completely new game" that existing content would not work with due to the change in core gameplay. There is not any traditional downloadable content for the game in the form of additional songs, instead using the streaming nature of GHTV to provide new songs. FreeStyleGames does not expect to make GHTV content available for offline play.

== Development ==
=== Background and aborted reboot ===
Rhythm games like Guitar Hero and Rock Band had been widely popular between 2005 and 2008, but due to oversaturation of the market and the onset of the recession in 2009, the rhythm genre suffered major setbacks, and the genre's popularity had quickly waned. Sales of the previous installment Guitar Hero: Warriors of Rock were below estimates and lower than previous games in the series. Weak sales of Warriors of Rock, in part, led to Activision cancelling a planned 2011 sequel, and shuttering the Guitar Hero franchise.

In a July 2011 interview with Forbes.com, Activision CEO Bobby Kotick stated that they were going to try to "reinvent" the series, but a former team member of Vicarious Visions has stated that as of 2012, all development of Guitar Hero has come to an end within Activision. Another source close to Vicarious Visions had reported to Kotaku that while Guitar Hero 7 was in development at Vicarious Visions, the game was considered a "disaster". The cancelled game omitted the additional instruments and used only a guitar peripheral, redesigning the unit to include six strings replacing the strum bar; the resulting unit was considered too expensive to manufacture and purchase. The developers had started from scratch to try to create new characters and venues that would be more reactive to the actual songs being played, to give the feel of a music video, but ultimately this proved too much of a challenge and had to be scrapped. Further, with a limited budget, the song selection was limited to "low-budget" hits of the 1990s, or at times reusing songs that had previously been included in Guitar Hero games. Though the team had a two-year development cycle, it was closed down after Activision president Eric Hirshberg had seen the current state of the project at the one-year point. Daniel Dilallo, a developer for Vicarious Visions at the time of cancellation, stated that he had come up with an idea of revitalizing the series using a first-person perspective approach, and had developed a prototype that he had called Guitar Hero Live at the time, though neither Activision nor FreeStyleGames have confirmed if this prototype was used as inspiration for the revived series.

=== As Guitar Hero Live ===
In February 2015, rumors surfaced that new entries in both the Guitar Hero and Rock Band franchises for eighth generation consoles were in development; Harmonix announced Rock Band 4 on 5 March 2015. On 14 April 2015, Activision officially announced a reboot of the Guitar Hero franchise, Guitar Hero Live, with development by FreeStyleGames.

In an interview with Fortune magazine, Activision's CEO of Publishing Eric Hirshberg found that even after five years without a game, the Guitar Hero brand still enjoyed high social media attention, with over 10 million followers on the Guitar Hero's Facebook page. However, Hirshberg stated that Activision realized they needed to reinvent the series so that consumers would not consider it much the same as previous games and to help sway those that were turned off by the earlier saturation of music games.

The task of developing the new game was given to FreeStyleGames around 2012. FreeStyleGames had developed both DJ Hero and DJ Hero 2, and while both games were critically praised, the latter was released on the downward trend of the music game genre. FreeStyleGames had suffered some layoffs as a result of the hiatus of the Guitar Hero series, though remained an Activision studio and financially viable due to their work for the Wii U Sing Party. As the development of Sing Party wrapped up, the studio created an internal research and development department to begin brainstorming what their next game would, with input from Activision. Hirshberg had encouraged the team to reconsider Guitar Hero, noting the fan dedication to the series, but noted that the game needed innovation to be successful. Activision gave the team freedom to develop the game without relying on the previous titles in the series. The core gameplay of Guitar Hero Live was rebuilt from scratch; developer Jamie Jackson explained that the goal of the game was to bring "big innovation" to the franchise rather than continue with the same format used by previous games. He explained to his staff to only "think of [Guitar Hero] as a name. Think of it as a music game with a guitar peripheral, but pretend that nothing else has ever been done." The team brainstormed on what had made the Guitar Hero series fun, and recounted the earlier titles of the series which were designed to enable the player to envision themselves as a superstar guitarist, subsequent design choices were made around recreating that experience. The team also cited fellow Activison franchise Call of Duty as an influence towards the goal of providing an immersive, first-person experience.

Though FreeStyleGames experimented with other options including a controller-less game, camera and motion detection, and social-based games, but recognized quickly that the guitar controller was a key part of the series' success. The developers recognized they wanted to have a guitar controller that players would not be embarrassed to have in their living rooms and spent time getting the look of the controller accurate to a real guitar. The design of the game's guitar controller was overhauled, using rapid prototyping to test potential guitar designs. The final design of the controller for Live utilizes a new design with six buttons arranged into two rows of three frets, designated by black and white-colored notes in-game, instead of using the traditional row of five colored frets used by previous Guitar Hero games. Jackson explained that the new layout was meant to make the game easier for new players, as the three-button layout avoids the need to use one's pinkie finger, a difficulty they recognized new players had on the traditional five-button controller. The layout was also designed to provide a new challenge to experienced players, including more realistic simulations of chords. The choice to use only three buttons also came from statistical analysis of past games, where about 80% of the players would never play harder than the Medium difficulty level which typically only required the use of three fingers with the previous five-button controllers. The initial controller iterations, presented both in-studio and to Activision, were met with skepticism but they found that players quickly adapted to the new scheme as an improvement over the older controllers. The "note highways" for the songs were created by both programmers and musicians using MIDI software as to map to each of the six controller buttons and the open strum bar. Note highways were developed first for the Expert difficulty level, essentially recreating the guitar part of the song note for note, while highways for lower difficulty levels were then constructed by removing notes while assuring the core rhythm of the song remained.

The Bolt tracking camera (on left) was used to capture the other band actors and audience members to create the live-action footage for the game.

The game itself is presented in a more realistic and immersive style; the rendered stages and characters of previous games are replaced by full motion video, shot from the first-person perspective of the lead guitarist, simulating real-world concert settings. The video footage is dynamic, and can transition between versions featuring positive or negative reactions by the crowd and band members based upon the player's performance. The first-person footage utilizes session musicians as actors playing the remaining members of the band, and is filmed using a Bolt robotic camera system, programmed to simulate the motions of a guitarist on stage. The Bolt ran along a 30 feet (9.1 m) track, and was able to move and turn quickly, mimicking the speed of a musician's movements. Prior to filming with the Bolt, an actor outfitted with motion and position detectors acted out the song with the other band actors; these movements were recorded and then used to direct the Bolt as it replaced the actor in subsequent takes. To avoid injury to the other actors from the motions of the camera, the routines were all choreographed based on the camera's motions and used as cues for the other actors. To enable smoother transitions between positive and negative versions of the band footage, multiple takes were performed for each song using the same camera motions. Groups of 200 to 400 actors were filmed using a green screen to construct crowds; using varying takes and other editing techniques, the groups of actors could be made to cover much larger areas. To simulate larger crowds, these shots were superimposed on a combination of live footage from actual rock concerts and 3D models constructed by FreeStyleGames. The effects studio Framestore helped with editing and assembling the digital live-action footage. Positional audio effects are also used as part of the footage, varying the volume of certain instruments depending on how close the player is to them on-screen in the footage.

Ten different bands represent the songs in the "Guitar Hero Live" mode, playing in two different music festivals. Members of these fictional bands were selected through auditions prior to filming, making sure that they could recreate the actual performance of a song, as well as mixing and matching members of ensemble groups to get the right look and feel. Bands were filmed in a warehouse in Oxford, England. To help with creating appropriate stage presence for the fictional bands and their fans, FreeStyleGames created material that each band would have had in the band's career, such as album covers and clothing, using various musical genres to help inspire their designs.

GHTV was designed by FreeStyleGames to allow them to provide new music without having to secure more stringent music licensing rights. FreeStyleGames found that this mode attracted the attention of bands who were eager to offer their music for it; the bands saw GHTV as comparable to the marketing that music television channels had done in the 1980s and 1990s, putting the imagery of the band at the player as they played along. FreeStyleGames also compared GHTV to music services like Spotify and Pandora Radio. This approach makes it easier to secure licensing rights, and fits in better with the current "throwaway culture" nature of society today according to Jackson. Jackson explained that the feature and its curated playlists were "about discovering music as much as it is about going and finding music you know you already like". Activision's Hirshberg stated that GHTV was developed as a better means to provide new songs to players through a round-the-clock content platform, rather than relying on scheduled downloadable content, allowing the company to provide a much larger quantity of songs, with plans for "hundreds at launch on day one" of the game's release.

Guitar Hero Live was considered to be a game that can be expanded upon in the future through content patches, as opposed to releasing new titles each year which had previously led to the music genre decline in 2009. Though FreeStyleGames added vocals prior to the game's launch, there are no present plans to include other instruments such as bass guitar or drums in the title, with Jackson stating that the game is "all about guitars".

=== Marketing and promotion ===
On 14 April 2015, Hirshberg and Jackson invited Pete Wentz of Fall Out Boy and Gerard Way of My Chemical Romance to promote the game. Wentz performed his band's song "My Songs Know What You Did in the Dark" in the Guitar Hero Live mode, while Way and Jackson dueled each other on My Chemical Romance's song "Na Na Na (Na Na Na Na Na Na Na Na Na)". A commercial for the game was revealed in October 2015, starring Lenny Kravitz and James Franco. In conjunction with Activision, The CW ran special promotional ads for Guitar Hero Live, featuring the actors David Ramsey and Candice Patton playing the game in the week prior to the game's release. Activision arranged to have rapper Macklemore play Guitar Hero Live with FreeStyleGames' Jamie Jackson during the halftime show of the Seattle Seahawks home game on the Sunday prior to the release of the game.

== Reception ==
Reception

Aggregate scores
Aggregator	Score
GameRankings	(WIIU) 83.75% (PS4) 81.91% (XONE) 80.93%
Metacritic	(WIIU) 84/100 (XONE) 81/100 (PS4) 80/100

Review scores
Publication	Score
Destructoid	9.5/10
Game Informer	7.5/10
GameRevolution	3.5/5
GameSpot	6/10
GamesRadar+	3.5/5
GameTrailers	8.7/10
IGN	7.9/10
Polygon	9/10

Guitar Hero Live received mostly positive reviews. Aggregating review websites GameRankings and Metacritic gave the Wii U version 83.75% based on 4 reviews and 84/100 based on 4 reviews, the PlayStation 4 version 81.91% based on 43 reviews and 80/100 based on 69 reviews and the Xbox One version 80.93% based on 20 reviews and 81/100 based on 21 reviews.

Most reviewers praised the risk of changing up the gameplay of Guitar Hero with the new controller design, contrasting to Rock Band 4's reliance on its established gameplay mechanics. Chris Carter of Destructoid considered the change a reinvention of the series, and though he had to relearn how to play the controller, enjoyed the experience and "the increased emphasis on chords and fancy finger-work". Griffin McElroy of Polygon also praised the new controller, finding that the higher difficulties in the game present "the most challenging fake guitar-playing" that he's seen, and having to relearn the new playing style through the game's difficulties levels was a "delight". Matt Miller of Game Informer found the six-button layout was not any better than the traditional five-button one, but "nails a different dynamic" as it feel like one was playing more realistic guitar chords. Though Game Revolution's Nick Tan was impressed with the challenge of the new controller, he felt the buttons themselves were too small and tight on the neck of the controller, and the new challenge may cause more casual players to forgo attempt to learn the new system and go back to Rock Band and the traditional layout.

The full-motion video aspect of GH Live was not as well-taken as the core gameplay. GameSpot's Scott Buttersworth found that he often ignored the motion video as he was too focused on the gameplay, and when he did notice it, felt it appeared "so campy [that] it borders on parody" as it "absolutely trips over itself to sell you on the idea that you're a totally super cool rockstar". Tristan Ogilvie of IGN also felt that the live action footage was "overly cheesy vamping", and further felt no connection to the band and bandmates he was to be playing along with as there was very little context given between sets. Ben Griffin of GamesRadar found that the crowd and bandmates only seemed to have two states, "fawning and furious", making the transition disconcerting when the game switched between the two states simply based on his performance. Brandon Jones of GameTrailers believed it was difficult to "take the actors seriously" in part due to the duality of the crowd reaction as well as that the song was still based on studio recordings, sounding off in the concert setting. Jones further commented that the fictional bands were well-matched to the songs they played, and that the pacing of the presentation, moving quickly between songs, made the experience feel more like a real concert. McElroy acknowledged the presentation can potentially be "cringe-worthy", but felt that the video was put together with self-awareness of this factor to make it more charming, noting some of the extra details that FreeStyleGames and the actors used to fully take on their roles.

The soundtrack for the GH Live portion was also considered weak. McElroy found most of the songs were from 2000 or later, forgoing classic rock songs, and considered the soundtrack to be the "biggest disappointment" of GH Live. Buttersworth stated that many of the on-disc selections are pop songs that "just aren't cut out for Guitar Hero gameplay", as they feature the same repeating guitar riff over and over. Griffin was more favorable of the on-disc set list, finding that the tracks represented "the music landscape as it is rather than as it was". Carter also appreciated the soundtrack, calling it a "good spread" of songs that can appeal to everyone.

The GHTV mode has mixed opinions, with most reviewers praising the concept, with the presentation of the channels were highlighted as hearkening to the heyday of MTV, and giving the player the ability to explore new music. However, reviewers were critical of the emphasis on microtransactions, and though the game was "generous" with providing free Plays and other in-game currency rewards, this approach could still disappoint some players. Carter found that he could ignore the microtransactions and instead enjoy the freely-playable curated music channels, helping him to play music that he had not yet heard or was outside of his normal play style, giving him a "a really cool feeling" about exploring new music, as well as seeing music videos from his youth again. Ogilvie similarly found that he could spend his time in GHTV within the free channels exploring new music, but believed the mode was "somewhat inflexible for the time poor" as players may not find the type of music they want to play when they are ready the play and that there was a lack of a programming guide for these channels. Griffin said that the pricing structure was weak compared to established DLC models, believing that the pricing for options like the Party Pack would have been better used to unlock the ability to play songs that he would enjoy. Miller stated that the microtransaction "structure is exploitative", preventing him from easily accessing his favorite songs to play and making him frustrated with the game in the long run. Buttersworth was displeased with the need to grind through songs in the free channels as to earn Play tokens to access a song he wanted to play, and the ability to permanently unlock a song, stating "that lack of freedom undermined a lot of the fun". Premium shows were particularly noted as problematic, in addition to the lack of a practice mode for the GHTV songs, which may impact how those players that seek to perfect every song would enjoy the game mode. Tan noted that in addition to either the time to complete the challenges or in-game currency to unlock the show, the player would have to complete the show in one of the ranked positions to earn the offered prize, and if they failed, they would have to repeat that process again.

In an earnings report shortly following the game's release, Activision stated that Guitar Hero Live was outselling their previous two Guitar Hero games, Guitar Hero: Warriors of Rock and Guitar Hero 5, though did not report exact sales numbers. In their quarterly earnings results presented in February 2016, Activision reported that sales for Guitar Hero Live missed their expectations, and in March 2016, announced that they had to let go of about 50 of FreeStyleGames' employees, though the studio still remains open to continue additional work for Activision. Prior to the Electronic Entertainment Expo 2016, Activision stated they will continue to produce content for Guitar Hero Live but have no present plans for another game.

Guitar Hero Live was nominated for "Game of the Year" at the 2016 NME Awards, and for "Family Game of the Year" at the AIAS' 19th Annual D.I.C.E. Awards. It was also nominated for "Excellence in Convergence" for the 2016 SXSW Gaming Awards, and for the "Family" award at the 2016 British Academy Games Awards.

A class-action lawsuit was filed against Activision in September 2018 in regards to the planned December shutdown of the GHTV service. The suit contends that Activision did not give a reasonable period of notice in a clear manner that the service would shut down, rendering most of the available songs unplayable. The suit was dismissed by the plaintiff without prejudice in January 2019. In February 2019, Activision offered refunds for anyone that had purchased Guitar Hero Live from December 2017 to January 2019, though did not state the reasons for this refund.
