= Roget (disambiguation) =

Peter Mark Roget (1779–1869) was a British physician and lexicographer known for his thesaurus.

Roget may also refer to:

- Roget's Thesaurus, a widely used English-language thesaurus by Peter Mark Roget

== People ==
- Dominique Mansuy Roget (1760–1832), French knight and baron
- Juan Roget (c. 1550–1624), Catalan spectacle maker and possible inventor of the telescope
- Leo Roget (born 1977), English footballer
- Léon Roget (1858–1909), Belgian soldier and colonial administrator

== See also ==
- Rogeting, modifying a source by using synonyms to fool plagiarism detection software
- "The Mystery of Marie Rogêt", 1842 short story by Edgar Allan Poe
