= Buzz! Junior: Monster Rumble =

2007 video game

- Developers: FreeStyleGames; Magenta Software; Cohort Studios (PS3)
- Publisher: Sony Computer Entertainment
- Series: Buzz! Junior
- Platforms: PlayStation 2; PlayStation 3 (PSN)
- Release: PlayStation 2: EU: 2 November 2007; AU: 8 November 2007; PlayStation 3: EU: 3 September 2009; NA: 15 October 2009
- Genre: Party
- Modes: Single-player, multiplayer

Buzz! Junior: Monster Rumble (known as Buzz! Junior: Monster Rally in North America) is a 2007 party video game developed by FreeStyleGames and published by Sony Computer Entertainment for the PlayStation 2. It is the third instalment in the Buzz! Junior series of games. Magenta Software developed the minigames while FreeStyleGames provided primary development, a direct inversion on their work on Buzz! Junior: Robo Jam.

The game was later ported to PlayStation 3 by Cohort Studios and was released on 3 September 2009 as a download from the PlayStation Store. It includes trophy support and the ability to use a DualShock wireless controller instead of Buzzers.

== Reception ==
Ellie Gibson of Eurogamer gave the game a 7/10 score in a mini review, praising it for its child-friendly gameplay and deviation from the series' quiz-focused formula, though she lamented its lack of replayability.
