= British Academy Children's Award for Game =

British Academy Children and Young People Award for Game
- Awarded for: The best games on any platform with a specific appeal to children and young people.
- Country: United Kingdom
- Presented by: British Academy of Film and Television Arts
- Currently held by: Sackboy: A Big Adventure (2022)
- Website: www.bafta.org/children

The British Academy Children and Young People Award for Game is an award presented annually by the British Academy of Film and Television Arts (BAFTA). It is given to "games on any platform with a specific appeal to children and young people".

The category includes non-British productions that have been released in the United Kingdom. It was first presented in 2007 with Buzz! Junior: Jungle Party being the first recipient of the award. The category was named Video Game until 2012, since then, it is presented as just Game. Traveller's Tales is the developer with the most wins with three while Sony Interactive Entertainment is the publisher with most wins in the category with four.

== Winners and nominees ==
=== 2000s ===
Year	Game	Recipient(s)	Developer(s)	Publisher(s)
2007 (12th)	Buzz! Junior: Jungle Party	Dave Allsopp, Paul Johnson, Ivan Davies	Magenta Software	Sony Interactive Entertainment Europe
2007 (12th)	Crash of the Titans		Radical Entertainment	Vivendi Games
2007 (12th)	Lego Star Wars: The Complete Saga	Erin Roberts, Tim Welch, Loz Doyle	Traveller's Tales	LucasArts
2007 (12th)	Harry Potter and the Order of the Phoenix	Harvey Elliott, Kelvin Tuite	EA UK, Rebellion Developments	Electronic Arts
2008 (13th)	Lego Batman: The Videogame	Jon Burton, James Cunliffe, Loz Doyle	Traveller's Tales	Warner Bros. Games
2008 (13th)	Professor Layton and the Curious Village	Akihiro Hino, Akira Tago	Level-5	Level-5, Nintendo
2008 (13th)	Guinness World Records: The Videogame	Erin Roberts, Mike Taylor, Nick Ricks	TT Fusion	Warner Bros. Games
2008 (13th)	Mario Kart Wii	Hideki Konno, Shigeru Miyamoto	Nintendo EAD	Nintendo
2009 (14th)	LittleBigPlanet		Media Molecule	Sony Interactive Entertainment
2009 (14th)	Boom Blox Bash Party		EA Los Angeles	Electronic Arts
2009 (14th)	De Blob		Universomo, Blue Tongue Entertainment	THQ
2009 (14th)	Viva Piñata: Pocket Paradise		Rare	THQ

=== 2010s ===
Year	Game	Recipient(s)	Developer(s)	Publisher(s)
2010 (15th)	Rabbids Go Home	Pierre-Arnaud Lambert, Jacques Exertier, Christophe Pic	Ubisoft Montpellier	Ubisoft
2010 (15th)	New Super Mario Bros. Wii	Shigeyuki Asuke, Takashi Tezuka, Hiroyuki Kimura	Nintendo EAD	Nintendo
2010 (15th)	Super Mario Galaxy 2	Koichi Hayashida, Yoshiaki Koizumi, Takashi Tezuka	Nintendo EAD	Nintendo
2010 (15th)	Pokémon HeartGold and SoulSilver	Shigeki Morimoto	Game Freak	Nintendo, The Pokémon Company
2011 (16th)	Lego Pirates of the Caribbean: The Video Game		Traveller's Tales	Disney Interactive Studios
2011 (16th)	Kirby's Epic Yarn		Good-Feel	Nintendo
2011 (16th)	LittleBigPlanet 2		Media Molecule	Sony Interactive Entertainment
2011 (16th)	Pokémon Black and White	Junichi Masuda	Game Freak	Nintendo, The Pokémon Company
2012 (17th)	Skylanders: Spyro's Adventure		Toys for Bob	Activision
2012 (17th)	Just Dance 3	Nino Sapina, Gregoire Spillman, Florian Granger	Ubisoft Paris	Ubisoft
2012 (17th)	LEGO Batman 2: DC Super Heroes	Jon Burton, John Hodskinson, Jonathan Smith	Traveller's Tales	Warner Bros. Games
2012 (17th)	Super Mario 3D Land		Nintendo EAD Tokyo	Nintendo
2013 (18th)	Skylanders: Giants		Toys for Bob	Activision
2013 (18th)	Animal Crossing: New Leaf		Nintendo EAD	Nintendo
2013 (18th)	Lego City Undercover		TT Fusion	
2013 (18th)	Luigi's Mansion 2		Next Level Games	
2014 (19th)	Mario Kart 8		Nintendo EAD	Nintendo
2014 (19th)	Pokémon X and Y		Game Freak	Nintendo, The Pokemon Company
2014 (19th)	Rayman Legends	Michel Ancel, Christophe Heral, Jean-christophe Alessandri	Ubisoft Montpellier	Ubisoft
2014 (19th)	Tearaway		Media Molecule	Sony Computer Entertainment
2015 (20th)	Splatoon		Nintendo	
2015 (20th)	Adventure Time: Game Wizard		Cartoon Network Games	Gummyface Studios
2015 (20th)	Minecraft Console Edition		Mojang Studios	
2015 (20th)	Yoshi's Woolly World		Good-Feel	Nintendo
2016 (21st)	Lego Dimensions	Leon Warren, James Mcloughlin, Jon Burton	Traveller's Tales	Warner Bros. Games
2016 (21st)	Ratchet & Clank		Insomniac Games	Sony Interactive Entertainment
2016 (21st)	Tearaway Unfolded		Media Molecule, Tarsier Studios	Sony Interactive Entertainment
2016 (21st)	Lego Star Wars: The Force Awakens	Mike Taylor, Paul Flanagan, James Norton	TT Fusion	Warner Bros. Games
2017 (22nd)	Pokémon Go		Niantic, Inc.	
2017 (22nd)	Monument Valley 2		Ustwo Games	
2017 (22nd)	The Playroom VR		Japan Studio	Sony Interactive Entertainment
2017 (22nd)	Pokémon Sun + Pokémon Moon		Game Freak	Nintendo, The Pokemon Company
2018 (23rd)	Mario + Rabbids Kingdom Battle		Ubisoft Milan	Ubisoft
2018 (23rd)	Everybody's Golf		Clap Hanz, Japan Studio	Sony Interactive Entertainment
2018 (23rd)	Knack II		Japan Studio	Sony Interactive Entertainment
2018 (23rd)	Frantics	Lau Koresgaard, Tim May, Claire Bromley	Sony Interactive Entertainment	
2019 (24th)	Astro Bot Rescue Mission		Japan Studio	Sony Interactive Entertainment
2019 (24th)	Chimparty		Sony Interactive Entertainment	
2019 (24th)	Lego DC Super-Villains	Stephen Sharples, David Hoye, Matt Ellison	Traveller's Tales	Warner Bros. Games
2019 (24th)	Overcooked 2		Team17, Ghost Town Games	Team17

=== 2020s ===
Year	Game	Recipient(s)	Developer(s)	Publisher(s)
2022 (25th)	Sackboy: A Big Adventure		Sumo Digital	Sony Interactive Entertainment
2022 (25th)	Astro's Playroom		Japan Studio	Sony Interactive Entertainment
2022 (25th)	Ratchet & Clank: Rift Apart		Insomniac Games	Sony Interactive Entertainment
2022 (25th)	Lego Star Wars: The Skywalker Saga		Traveller's Tales	Warner Bros. Games

- Note: The series that don't have recipients on the tables had Production team credited as recipients for the award or nomination.

== See also ==
- British Academy Games Award for Family
