= 3D Pocket Pool =

2001 video game

- Developer(s): Aardvark Software
- Publisher(s): Virgin Interactive
- Platform(s): Game Boy Color
- Release: March 2001
- Genre(s): Sports simulation – pool
- Mode(s): Single-player,

3D Pocket Pool is a 2001 pool game for the Game Boy Color, developed by Aardvark Software and published by Virgin Interactive.

== Gameplay ==
The start of a game

3D Pocket Pool allows players to billiards on a simulated 3D table. The game contains four modes: Practice, Tournament, Two-Player, and Killer, and features several variations of billiards rules. "Two-Player" mode allows two human players to play a game with the same Game Boy by alternating turns. "Killer" mode pits the player against two opponents with custom rules that require the player to sink a ball every turn. The game features a selectable range of characters to add variety to the tournament play.

== Development ==
3D Pocket Pool was developed by developers Nick Pelling and Jeff Ferguson. Aardvark Software was the company Nick Pelling had used in the 1980s to develop software for personal computers, such as Frak! and Firetrack. 3D Pocket Pool bears similarities to 3D Pool, a 1990 title developed for the Amiga by Aardvark Software.

The game experienced an unorthodox production due to a lack of interest and marketing of the game. Requested by publisher Virgin Interactive to handle the public relations in-house, Pelling had "tried everything else to get the game some attention", and decided to pitch a redesign of the game to Nintendo as Wario Pool, going so far as to develop an introductory sequence for the game featuring Wario. This pitch failed to come to fruition, and 3D Pocket Pool was released as originally planned."

== Reception ==
Reception

Review scores
Publication	Score
Total Game Boy	85%
Game Boy Xtreme	89%

3D Pocket Pool received positive reviews. Total Game Boy stated "with zany characters and everything in 3D, Pocket Pool is worth the entrance fee...this is quite simply the best pool game available for (the) Game Boy at the moment, and with plenty of options you could be playing for quite a while". Similarly, Game Boy Xtreme praised 3D Pocket Pool as "the best ball-n-baize game on the Game Boy yet - bar none." Developer Nick Pelling spoke fondly of the game, stating "it was a decent little game with brilliant music that made the Game Boy sound better than it had any right to."
