= Buzz!: Brain Bender =

2008 video game

- European cover art
- Developer: Curve Studios
- Publisher: Sony Computer Entertainment
- Series: Buzz!
- Platform: PlayStation Portable
- Release: EU: 28 November 2008; AU: 4 December 2008
- Genre: Puzzle
- Modes: Single-player, multiplayer

Buzz!: Brain Bender is a 2008 party video game developed by Curve Studios and published by Sony Computer Entertainment for the PlayStation Portable. It is a spin-off of the Buzz! series and the second game in the series to be made for a handheld console. Unlike other games in the Buzz! series Brain Bender is a puzzle game rather than a quiz game. The game features 16 mini-games covering four categories: Analysis, Observation, Memory, and Calculation with each category having three levels of difficulty easy, normal, and hard. The multiplayer aspect of the game is a customisable four-round match called Brain Battle.
