= Buzz!: The Pop Quiz =

2008 video game

- European box art
- Developer: Relentless Software
- Publisher: Sony Computer Entertainment
- Series: Buzz!
- Platform: PlayStation 2
- Release: EU: 14 March 2008; AU: 15 May 2008
- Genre: Party
- Modes: Single-player, multiplayer

Buzz!: The Pop Quiz is a 2008 party video game developed by Relentless Software and published by Sony Computer Entertainment for the PlayStation 2. It is the sixth instalment in the Buzz! series. The game features music from the 1990s to the then-present day. To coincide with the release of the game, Sony launched a website called letsplaybuzz.com (now defunct) which allowed users to take part in a short 10-question sample game.

== Rounds ==
- Name that Band - Listen carefully to an audio clip and identify the band.
- Musical Squares - One player chooses a subject and everyone answers questions.
- Pass the Bomb! - One person answers a question and when the get it right they pass the bomb to the next player.
- Video Stars - Watch a video of pop stars and answer a question about the video.
- Pie Fight - First one to get the answer right gets to throw the pie.
- Pop Picker - Hit your buzzer on a subject and choose who answers the question before it comes up.
- Point Stealer - First person to get the answer right steals points from one player.
- What's That Song - A timer is put on and you try to answer the questions as fast as you can.
