= The Shoot (video game) =

2010 video game

- Developer: Cohort Studios
- Publisher: Sony Computer Entertainment
- Platform: PlayStation 3
- Release: NA: 19 October 2010; AU: 28 October 2010; EU: 29 October 2010
- Genres: Light gun shooter, Rail shooter
- Modes: Single-player, Multiplayer

The Shoot is a 2010 rail shooter video game developed by Cohort Studios and published by Sony Computer Entertainment for the PlayStation 3. It utilizes the PlayStation Move controllers. It was officially unveiled at the 2010 Game Developers Conference in San Francisco.

== Setting ==
Players in the game have to help film a series of Hollywood action films, thus the players have takes rather than lives in the game. The game's story consists of several scenes and overarching chapters each focused around different films. The game also contains subtle hints towards the current generation of Hollywood films such as "Robotomus Crime" a play on the name Optimus Prime from the recent Transformers series of films.

== Gameplay ==
Gameplay of one level in The Shoot where players face off against robot enemies

Players will traverse through 5 unique Hollywood-style levels such as an Alien Cyborg invasion, a western cowboy-style town as well as horror themes. The game is a Light gun shooter which utilizes the PlayStation Move for an arcade-style sci-fi Shoot 'em up game. The game is mainly a Rail shooter, however there are also other moves using Move; for instance players have to tilt side to side to dodge oncoming missiles or get a better angle on their shot (the latter usually utilised when enemies hide behind innocent human beings), and lower their gun which hiding behind cover or in preparation for a "quick-draw" duel.

The game differs from its competitors through the use of its special moves, which are gained by putting together consecutive hitstreaks (accuracy streaks are much more important than killing enemies before they can fire) and then activated by performing certain combos. For instance there is the Shockwave blast which can clear an entire screen of enemies by aiming the Move down below the screen, and there is the Rampage rapid fire by aiming above the screen that grants the player a machine gun for a short period of time (without an accuracy penalty). Players can also slow down time by making a full three hundred and sixty degree twist in front of the PlayStation Eye to execute the move.

== Reception ==
Reception

Aggregate score
Aggregator	Score
Metacritic	60/100

Review scores
Publication	Score
Destructoid	5.5/10
Edge	5/10
Eurogamer	5/10
Famitsu	26/40
Game Informer	6/10
GameSpot	6.5/10
IGN	6/10
PlayStation: The Official Magazine	7/10
Push Square	6/10
The Telegraph	5/10

Award
Publication	Award
The Herald Digital Awards 2010	Commendation

The game received "mixed" reviews according to the review aggregation website Metacritic. In Japan, where the game was ported for release under the name Shooting Studio (シューティングスタジオ, Shūtingu Sutajo) on 27 January 2011, Famitsu gave it a score of two sevens and two sixes for a total of 26 out of 40.

Kotaku praised the game's quick and easy take on the shooter genre along with the game's visuals and clever enemy design. Its only criticism was that sometimes controls can feel sluggish. Ars Technica also queried an initial controller lag, but stated that the player soon gets used to it. It also went on to praise the game's price and replay value.

Video game talk show Good Game gave the game a 7 out of 10, saying that the game uses the Move well as well nailing the visuals and having decent replay value.
