= Buzz! Junior: Dino Den =

2008 video game

- Developer: Cohort Studios
- Publisher: Sony Computer Entertainment
- Series: Buzz! Junior
- Platforms: PlayStation 2; PlayStation 3 (PSN)
- Release: PlayStation 2: EU: 22 February 2008; PlayStation 3: EU: 10 December 2009
- Genre: Party
- Modes: Single-player, multiplayer

Buzz! Junior: Dino Den is a 2008 party video game developed by Cohort Studios and published by Sony Computer Entertainment for the PlayStation 2. It is the fourth instalment in the Buzz! Junior series of party games. The game features dinosaurs as players. Buzz! Junior: Dino Den consists of thirty-five different mini-games, including ten new team mini-games.

The game was later ported to PlayStation 3 and was released on 10 December 2009 in Europe as a download from the PlayStation Store. It includes trophy support and the ability to use a DualShock wireless controller as well as the Buzz! buzzers.

== Gameplay ==
Gameplay is based around multiple mini-games, each quite simple and straightforward to play using the four Buzz! controllers. The game primarily aimed at the family market but offers appealing entertainment to almost anyone of any age. Simple game play allows young children to participate while still being entertaining enough for older children and adults.

The game is similar in concept to the other Buzz! Junior-games, offering dinosaur-based mini-games in a prehistoric environment. One of the main new additions Dino Den brings to the series is team-play, where the 4 players are divided into 2 teams and work together to win that specific mini-game. If there are not enough human players, a computer player will fill the open slot.

== Reception ==
Reception

Aggregate score
Aggregator	Score
Metacritic	69/100

Review scores
Publication	Score
Jeuxvideo.com	13/20
PALGN	7/10
VideoGamer.com	8/10
Gameplanet	7/10
Gamer.nl	7/10

Buzz! Junior: Dino Den received "mixed or average" reviews according to Metacritic.
