= Buzz!: The Sports Quiz =

2006 video game

- European box art
- Developer: Kuju Entertainment
- Publisher: Sony Computer Entertainment
- Series: Buzz!
- Platform: PlayStation 2
- Release: EU: 10 November 2006; AU: 16 November 2006
- Genre: Party
- Modes: Single-player, multiplayer

Buzz!: The Sports Quiz is a 2006 party video game developed by Kuju Entertainment and published by Sony Computer Entertainment for the PlayStation 2. It is the third instalment in the Buzz! series and the first not to be developed by Relentless Software. Like the Buzz!: The Music Quiz, it was released only in Europe and Australia. Players answer questions asked by the Quizmaster (the titular Buzz, voiced by Jason Donovan) using their Buzz! buzzers.

== Gameplay ==
The game is very similar to an actual game show, fit with the eponymous Quizmaster, his 'delicious' sidekick (Rose), buzzers, a theme song and an audience which claps and laughs. In every type of game, players must choose from easy mode or hard mode.

Players can choose from the 16 avatars, each representing different sports. These include an auto racing driver, a darts player, a tennis player, a basketball player, a footballer/soccer player, an ice hockey goalkeeper, a shotputter, a volleyball player, a sumo wrestler, a skier, a rugby player, a golfer, a horse rider, a cricketer, a boxer and an American football player. There are also three colour palettes, referred to as costumes, to choose from for each avatar. Players can choose from a short game, standard game, long game or a custom game.

=== Game modes ===
Any number of players from 1–8 can play at any one time.

Single player

A player can try to get as many points as possible in two different rounds.

Multiplayer

2–8 players play against each other for the most points.

Team player

3–8 players can team up to play against other teams for the most points. Each team chooses a captain.

=== Rounds ===
==== Multiplayer/team play ====
- Point Builder - A question comes up on the screen. Everyone answers in their own time with the coloured buttons.
- Fastest Finger - Everyone answers as quick as they can. Fastest to answer correctly scores the most points.
- Spin - A board with four randomly selected sports plus a 'question mark' section is placed on a wheel. Players take turns trying to stop the arrow on their preferred sport. Everybody answers the question.
- World of Sport - Starting in Great Britain, players answer questions to move around the world through various countries, finally ending up back in Britain. A right answer will move a player, while a quick answer might move a player two places along. The question will be about the country the leader is on.
- Expert - Each player gets 60 seconds to fill in their bar by answering questions correctly. Each correct answer extends the bar, while each incorrect answer shrinks the bar. The player with the longest bar is the winner and receives bonus points.
- Finish Line - Players are shown running on a treadmill with the finish tape ahead of them. To move closer, players must answer questions correctly.
- Point Stealer - A question will appear and then one possible answer at a time will show up. Players must buzz as soon as they see what they think is the correct answer.
- Risk - Players are shown what the next question will be about. They then choose how many points they want to bet on the question. If they answer correctly, they get what they wagered, otherwise those points are lost.
- Estimation - A question will appear. A bar at the bottom will show the amounts. An arrow moves up and down the bar. Players must buzz when the arrow is on their desired answer.
- Pass the Bomb - A bomb is randomly given to one of the players. They must answer the question that appears correctly to pass the bomb to the next player. The bomb ticks faster and faster until it explodes. The person holding the bomb when it explodes loses points.

==== Single player ====
- Time Builder - The player must answer questions to get time needed for the final round. The quicker they answer, the more seconds they get.
- Hot Seat - The player has as much time as achieved in Time Builder to get points. A correct answer moves the player up the point ladder. The player can bank their points at any time in between a question. A wrong answer will take the player back to the start of the ladder.
