= Buzz! Junior: Ace Racers =

2008 video game

- Developer: Cohort Studios
- Publisher: Sony Computer Entertainment
- Series: Buzz! Junior
- Platform: PlayStation 2
- Release: EU: 24 October 2008
- Genres: Party, racing
- Modes: Single-player, multiplayer

Buzz! Junior: Ace Racers is a 2008 party video game developed by Cohort Studios and published by Sony Computer Entertainment for the PlayStation 2. It is the fifth and latest instalment in the Buzz! Junior series, as well as the only to not be released on the PlayStation 3 despite releasing very late in its predecessor's lifespan.

== Reception ==
GamesRadar scored the game as 3/5 and was happy with the variety of game types but criticised the racing mini-games and the "stuck record" announcer. Videogamer.com score the game as 8/10 and praised the mixture of games, the colourful graphics and the ease of play, but was undecided on whether it was a better than previous Buzz! Junior titles.
