= The Cat in the Hat (video game) =

2003 video game

- PC cover art
- Developers: Magenta Software (PS2, Xbox); Digital Eclipse (Windows, GBA)
- Publisher: Vivendi Universal Games (Note: Released under the Coktel brand name in PAL regions.)
- Directors: Paul Johnson; Dave Allsopp
- Producers: Jared Brinkley; Stephen Townsend
- Composer: Keith Leary (Game Audio Ltd.)
- Platforms: Game Boy Advance, Windows, PlayStation 2, Xbox
- Release: NA: November 4, 2003 (PS2, Xbox, GBA); NA: November 9, 2003 (Windows); EU: March 19, 2004
- Genre: Platform
- Mode: Single-player

The Cat in the Hat (also known as Dr. Seuss' The Cat in the Hat) is a 2003 2.5D platform game for PlayStation 2, Xbox, Microsoft Windows and Game Boy Advance. The PlayStation 2 and Xbox versions were developed by Magenta Software. The Windows and Game Boy Advance versions were developed by Digital Eclipse. All versions of the game were published by Vivendi Universal Games. It is based on the 2003 film of the same name, which was released shortly after the game. A version for the GameCube was planned but was never released. The game received mixed reviews from critics, some considered it an improvement over the film.

== Gameplay ==
=== PlayStation 2, Xbox, and Windows ===
The Cat rides a rocket from the foreground to the background in the level 'Venus Cat Trap'.

Conrad and Sally's house serves as a hub world whose stages are household objects or rooms which have been corrupted by magic. (Note: When the player starts a new game, they can only explore the living room, as Conrad and Sally prevent the Cat from going upstairs and into the kitchen and garage until certain levels are cleared.) The Cat explores worlds and chases Quinn out of them while gathering the scattered magic. In the game's boss fights, the Cat fights Quinn's machine (Note: If the player revisits a boss fight after completing it, Thing One and Thing Two pilot the machine instead of Quinn.) and fires projectiles into its exhaust pipe to damage it and obtain a portion of the Crablock. There are ten levels, a bonus level, and three boss fights. (Note: The PC version has two boss instead of three.)

To traverse levels, the Cat can jump, glide and slam the ground with his umbrella, and collect enemies and explosive goo in bubbles for use as projectiles, among other maneuvers. The Cat has five hit points and takes damage by colliding with enemies, projectiles, and hazards. Losing all five hit points or falling into a bottomless pit causes the Cat to lose a life and be placed at the most recent checkpoint. Losing all lives results in a game over, sending the Cat to the beginning of the level. Collecting cupcake slices and hearts, respectively, restores hit points and lives.

The game's primary collectible is small clusters of magic whose value varies by color. Entering each stage requires a certain amount of magic, and collecting every cluster in a stage returns its appearance in the hub world to normal. Each stage contains four keys – stolen by Thing One and Thing Two – which unlock a bonus door. (Note: The bonus stages are skipped in the PC version; the door instead yields the magic and gems immediately.[1]) Bonus doors contain a short segment of gameplay with additional magic and a gem. The game's secret level, Mystical Mirror, is unlocked by collecting every gem. Finally, clapperboards can be found which unlock clips from the movie for viewing in the menu.

=== Game Boy Advance ===
In addition to platforming stages, the Game Boy Advance version contains four stages where the player scuba dives to obtain pieces of the Crablock. There's also a bonus stage where the Cat drives his cleaning machine to catch Thing One and Thing Two. Collectibles include icons related to the theme of the stage as well as enemies that have been defeated.

== Plot ==
On a stormy day, Conrad (Chase Chavarria) and Sally (Andrea Bowen) are confined inside their house while their mother is gone. The Cat in the Hat (Chris Edgerly) arrives to bring them cheer, but their next-door neighbor, Larry Quinn (Fred Tatasciore), steals the Crablock which seals the Cat's magical crate, causing magic to flood the house and unleash chaos that threatens the world. The Cat makes his way through different stages—household objects or rooms which have been corrupted by the magic—with the guidance of the family's fish (Nolan North), recaptures the magic, and chases Quinn, who is after the magic in a quest to become immensely powerful. After the Cat cleans the house of all magic and defeats Quinn, the Crablock reattaches to the crate, sealing away the magic.

The plot of the Game Boy Advance version is largely the same, with the exception that Conrad removes the lock, as Quinn is not present.

== Reception ==
Reception

Aggregate scores
Aggregator	Score
GameRankings	(Xbox) 52.67% (PS2) 50% (GBA) 46.50% (PC) 19.50%
Metacritic	(Xbox) 56/100 (PS2) 56/100 (GBA) 40/100 (PC) 40/100

Review scores
Publication	Score
Computer and Video Games	30/100
Famitsu	27/40
GameSpot	3.8/10 (GBA)
GameZone	(PC) 8/10 (PS2) 7.2/10 (GBA) 5/10
IGN	6/10 (GBA) 4/10
Nintendo Power	2.3/5
Official U.S. PlayStation Magazine	2/5
Official Xbox Magazine (US)	5.5/10
PC Gamer (UK)	9%
PC Zone	30%
X-Play	2/5

The Cat in the Hat received mixed reviews, except for the PC and Game Boy Advance versions, which received unfavorable reviews.

=== Windows ===
GameZone gave the Windows version an overall score of 8/10, praising the gameplay as fun and easy, the graphics as "bright and vivid", and the soundtrack as "catchy", saying the presentation "captures the essence of Seuss" better than the movie. However, they criticized levels as "tend[ing] to be very similar to each other", the backgrounds as "pixelated", and the content as ordinary.

Computer and Video Games gave the game a 3.0/10 and called it "a shameless cash-in", "just trash", "a big pile of sh...", and "fit for the litter tray".

PC Gamer UK gave it a 9%, calling it "steaming effluent" and the worst platform game they played. They criticized the Cat's performance as "annoying", cited bugs they experienced with the game such as collision issues, complained of poor level design, and called the graphics "drab" and outdated.

=== Game Boy Advance ===
GameSpot gave the Game Boy Advance version a 3.8/10, calling games like it "the reason why licensed games have such a bad reputation". They said the game "isn't any fun to play", calling the gameplay boring and unimaginative. They praised the graphics as "pleasing to the eye", but called the sound design lackluster. They concluded that Vivendi "missed a great opportunity" and called it "just a generic punch-and-run".

== See also ==
- List of video games based on films
