= Buzz! Junior: Robo Jam =

2007 video game

- UK box art for PS2 version
- Developers: Magenta Software; FreeStyleGames; Cohort Studios (PS3)
- Publisher: Sony Computer Entertainment
- Series: Buzz! Junior
- Platforms: PlayStation 2; PlayStation 3 (PSN)
- Release: PlayStation 2: EU: 25 May 2007; AU: 31 May 2007; NA: 11 March 2008; PlayStation 3: EU: 14 May 2009; NA: 9 July 2009
- Genre: Party
- Modes: Single-player, multiplayer

Buzz! Junior: Robo Jam is a party video game developed by Magenta Software and published by Sony Computer Entertainment for the PlayStation 2. It is the second instalment in the Buzz! Junior series, It is the second game to be developed by FreeStyleGames, who developed the minigames. Cohort Studios developed a PlayStation 3 version.

Gameplay comprises multiple mini-games, each quite simple and straightforward to play using the four Buzz! buzzers. It is primarily aimed at the family market but offers appealing entertainment to almost anyone of any age. Simple game play allows young children to participate while still being entertaining enough for older children and adults. The game is similar in concept to Buzz! Junior: Jungle Party, with robot based mini-games in a space-themed environment. One of the main differences between Jungle Party and Robo Jam is the introduction of AI, allowing players to play against the computer. Unlike Jungle Party there is no solo game mode. A full game can be played with only one human player and three computer players.

Buzz! Junior: Robo Jam won the 2007 Children's Jury Giga Maus award.

== Gameplay ==
Gameplay comprises multiple mini-games, each quite simple and straightforward to play using the four Buzz! controllers. It is primarily aimed at the family market but offers appealing entertainment to almost anyone of any age. The narrator (Phil Hayes) introduces each minigame and describes how to play the minigame. Simple game play allows young children to participate while the minigames are still entertaining enough for older children and adults. The game is similar in concept to Jungle Party, with robot based mini-games in a space-themed environment. One of the main differences between Jungle Party and Robo Jam is the introduction of AI, allowing players to play against the computer. Unlike Jungle Party there is no solo game mode. A full game can be played with only one human player and three computer players.

== Development ==
Robo Jam was co-developed by Magenta Software and FreeStyleGames. Magenta supplied the engine and nineteen of the twenty five mini-games while Freestyle supplied the remaining six mini-games. Cohort Studios developed a PlayStation 3 version of the game that was released on the PlayStation Store on 14 May 2009 which included trophy support and added support for Sixaxis and/or Dualshock 3 controllers.

== Reception ==
Buzz! Junior: Robo Jam received generally mixed reviews from critics, holding a score of 67.53% on GameRankings based on 17 reviews. Greg Miller of IGN gave the game a 6.5/10 and said that the game "isn't beautiful or deep, but it is a solid game for families to occasionally gather around. Chad Sapieha of Common Sense Media however, gave the game 2 stars and an on rating for ages 7 and up, and said that "the mini-games are, by and large, well executed and fairly fun", the game was criticised for its lack of mini-games and that the game contains "no unlockable bonus activities, no art galleries, and no secret characters.".

Buzz! Junior: Robo Jam won the 2007 Children's Jury Giga Maus award.
