= Disney Think Fast =

2008 video game

- North American cover art
- Developer: Magenta Software
- Publisher: Disney Interactive Studios
- Platforms: PlayStation 2 Wii
- Release: Wii: NA: October 21, 2008; AU: December 4, 2008; EU: December 5, 2008; JP: December 18, 2008; PlayStation 2: NA: November 7, 2008; EU: November 14, 2008; AU: December 5, 2008
- Genre: Trivia
- Modes: Single-player, multiplayer

Disney Think Fast (stylized as Disney TH!NK Fast) is a Disney-themed trivia game show-based game developed by Magenta Software and published by Disney Interactive Studios. The game was released for the Wii in North America on October 21, 2008, and for Europe, Australia and Japan in December. The game was also released for PlayStation 2 in North America on November 7, November 14 in Europe, and in Australia on December 5 (the same day the Wii version of the game was released in Europe).

The game borrows its elements from the Scene It? DVD game franchise and Buzz! and is hosted by Genie from the film Aladdin who introduces and gives results for each round. Each game contains 15 rounds and takes about 30–40 minutes to play.

== Gameplay ==
Players get more points for choosing correct answers.

Disney Think Fast is a trivia game show-based game. Each game can be played with up to four players who can play as various Disney characters including Mickey Mouse, Minnie Mouse, Donald Duck, Daisy Duck, Goofy, Clarabelle Cow and Horace Horsecollar. The game also includes 4 stages, including Ocean Grotto, Regent's Park, Hawaiian Beach and The Pridelands. Each game takes about 30–40 minutes and contains 15 rounds. There are over 5,000 questions that can be asked, and each one has 2-4 multiple choice answers. Players get more points for correct answers as the rounds increase, and in later rounds, players get penalized for choosing wrong answers.

The game also contains unlockable characters for completing each game in single player mode, including Scrooge McDuck, Magica De Spell, and Pete. However, in multi-player mode, the winner unlocks a costume for their character, depending on the stage they're playing on.

=== Categories ===
Each round has a different Category: Memory and Strategy, Speed and Agility, as well as Trivia and Knowledge. In the Memory and Strategy rounds, players have to focus on cards before they flip and answer how many objects there were after the cards flip, or memorize what were used or certain events that happened in Disney Movies. In the Speed and Agility rounds, players have to answer which object is odd after it is done spinning, or answer other questions quickly. In the Trivia and Knowledge rounds, players have to answer trivia questions about Disney movies.

=== Mini-games ===
In each round, players play different types of mini-games that are part of one of the categories. There are 16 mini-games in the game:

- Balloon Burst - Players have to pop an opponent's balloon by answering questions correctly before anyone else does. Each player starts with two balloons. Players who run out of balloons are removed from the game. The last player standing wins the mini-game.
- Clued In - A character is slowly drawn on the screen while clues are presented to guide the players. The players must use these clues to identify the character that is being drawn on the screen.
- Fast Chance - Players have to answer basic and general knowledge questions from 3 out of 10 different categories. This usually is the first round in the game.
- 50/50 - Players choose between two images with questions such as: "Who is the oldest?" or "Who is the heaviest?".
- Free Throw - Players have to throw as many melons as possible into a Barrel (setting being Agrabah from Aladdin).
- High or Low - Players have to choose which card from Alice in Wonderland has the higher or lower number.
- Observation - Players watch movie clips without the sound and have to answer five questions related to the movie clip.
- Odd One Out - Players have to pick the odd one out from pictures of the muses from Hercules.
- Quick Count - Players have to answer how many items were on the screen.
- Quick Draw - Players have to choose right answers first before anyone else does to score points.
- Rapid Ranking - Players have to rank a series of four items in order before time runs out.
- Spotlight - Players have to answer eight questions in one minute.
- Starstruck - A special guest host will read the questions about the movie that he was in. There are four guest stars representing each location in the game, with the movies being: Lilo & Stitch, The Lion King, The Little Mermaid, and 101 Dalmatians.
- Take A Guess - Players have to recognise images.
- Top Toon - This happens on the last round of the game. In this mini-game, players have to answer questions before other players to steal points from other players.
- True or False - Players have to identify if a "fact" is true or false.
- Under Pressure - The player has to answer as many questions as possible correctly before their time runs out (only in Single Player Mode).
- Zone In - Players have to buzz in at the correct time to get the correct answer.

=== Controls ===
Both versions of the game have a different control scheme. In the PlayStation 2 version, the game uses Buzz! buzzers, which are bundled with the game. In the Wii version, players have to use the D-pad (or the Analog Stick) to choose an answer. There's also an option to use motion controls. In the motion control scheme, players hold the B button (or C Button) while moving the Wii Remote (or Nunchuk) up, down, left or right to choose an answer.

== Development ==
Think Fast was first announced at Disney's Press Release in July 2008. Disney promised the game to be a family favourite party game for the holiday season. The PlayStation 2 version is bundled with a set of Buzz! buzzers, while the Wii version utilises the Wii Remote and Nunchuk as buzzers. Craig Relyea, senior vice president of global marketing, said: "The perfect party game for the entire family, Disney TH!NK Fast is guaranteed to give your brain cells a high-intensity entertainment workout this holiday season. Whether you're 6, 16 or 60, you're never too old for a friendly showdown".

== Reception ==
Reception

Aggregate score
Aggregator	Score
Metacritic	PlayStation 2 NR based on 3 reviews Wii; NR based on 3 reviews

Review scores
Publication	Score
GameSpot	5/10 (Wii)
IGN	5.5/10 (Wii)

Reviews for the Wii version of the game have been mixed. Jack DeVries of IGN gave the game stated that "Disney's Think Fast has a nice presentation that combines some classic and popular Disney franchises. And while it's not original, the Buzz games are decent games to copy for a license title. However, the overly simple questions limit the game to only very young children. More importantly, the game repeats questions and has delayed controls that mess up the very nature of a quiz game. If there are some major Disney movie fans in your household this game might be entertaining for a round or two, but you're way better off getting something like the Disney branded Scene It or Trivial Pursuit games". Austin Light of GameSpot wrote: "This family-friendly trivia game is fun while it lasts, but its mostly easy questions are repeated far too frequently".

Harold Goldberg of Common Sense Media, however, gave the game four stars and an age rating for ages 6 and up, and praised the game's educational value and messages about being smart, though warned parents about mild cartoon violence in some of the film clips in the game.

The PlayStation 2 version of the game, however, did receive positive reviews. Brian Dumlao of Worth Playing said that the game's questions are "of the right difficulty level and the presentation, while not perfect, is good enough so that fans won't feel like they were given a bare-bones effort". Brian said that "Disney TH!NK Fast challenges players to think fast in a new game show-style quiz game that will test players’ Disney and general knowledge, promising to be a family favourite party game this holiday season". Micky Gunn of Gameplanet criticized the game's lack of challenge for anyone older than ten, but praised it for its selection of Disney films and characters and extremely simple gameplay with a variety of fast-paced rounds.
