= Liz Barker =

British TV presenter (born 1975)

- Born: Elizabeth Jane Barker; 16 May 1975 (age 50); Cambridge, Cambridgeshire, England
- Occupation: Television presenter
- Known for: Blue Peter presenter
- Spouse: Michael Todd
- Children: 4

Elizabeth Jane Barker (born 16 May 1975) is an English television presenter, best known for her work on Blue Peter from 2000 to 2006.

== Early life and education ==
Born in Cambridge, Barker grew up in the village of Oakington, near Cambridge and attended Impington Village College before undertaking a philosophy degree at the University of Southampton. After this was completed, she became a runner for independent production company Lion TV, a researcher, and eventually the sports presenter for BBC Choice programme Backstage.

== Career ==
On 23 June 2000 Barker joined the children's television programme Blue Peter. During her six years on the programme she reported from Vietnam, Morocco, Brazil, Austria, Greece, India and the U.S. Her adventures included an inverted spin in a jet, lawn mower racing, paragliding, walking a circus high-wire, cleaning windows at London's Canary Wharf tower. She won a bronze medal in the two-woman Bob at the British Bobsleigh championships, trained as a Childline counsellor for the charities appeal and once held the Guinness World Record for putting on a duvet cover.

She interviewed celebrities, including David Beckham, Quentin Blake and Elton John, whom she presented with a Gold Blue Peter badge in Las Vegas. She also raced former Formula 1 World Champion Lewis Hamilton at go-karts. She met the Queen at BBC Television Centre, where her colleague Simon Thomas presented Her Majesty with a Gold Blue Peter badge. She played Elizabeth I, Queen Victoria and Beatrix Potter in Blue Peter films, performed the lead role in the shows BBC Christmas specials 'Rock & Roll Christmas' (2001), 'Christmas At The Club Blue Peter' (2002) and 'Totally Blue Peter' (2005) and acted in the shows mini-series The Quest. She presented the Children's Proms at the Royal Albert Hall, the Blue Peter summer roadshows and the Queens Jubilee Concert.

In 2003, Barker won the Children & Youth category in the CRE Race in the Media Awards for her film on Auschwitz for the Holocaust Memorial Day with survivor Kitty Hart-Moxon.

On 25 May 2004 Barker announced that she was pregnant with her first child, by husband Michael Todd. A boy, Dexter Jack Barker Todd, was born on Saturday 4 December 2004 and featured on the show many times, including at just 13 days old, on his first birthday and on Barker's leaving date. She became the first presenter to rejoin Blue Peter after having a baby, but on 23 January 2006 she told viewers that she would be leaving the programme at Easter and moving away from London so she could spend more time with her family. She was replaced by Zöe Salmon, who originally took Liz's place in December 2004 when she had her baby.

During her six years on Blue Peter Barker presented with Konnie Huq, Simon Thomas, Matt Baker, Zöe Salmon and Gethin Jones.

On 11 April 2006 Barker left the programme with a special This Is Your Life-style show devoted to her, featuring former presenters, family, friends and people she had met along her Blue Peter travels, including Kitty Hart-Moxon. She also announced, on her last live show, that she would be co-presenting a new CBBC show, Totally Doctor Who, with CBBC's Barney Harwood; the first episode was broadcast on 13 April 2006.

On 18 September 2006 it was announced on Blue Peter that Barker was expecting another baby and on 20 February 2007 it was announced on Blue Peter that she had given birth to a girl called Poppy. She has since given birth to Rocco Winston Todd in 2011 and Gus Lennon Todd in 2013.

After she left TV Barker spent several years working as a cake decorator for her family's bakery business. She also presented a radio show on Cambridge 105. She was the voice of Buzz in the Sony PlayStation game Buzz! Junior: Jungle Party. She was the voiceover artist for the NMG Awards from 2016-2018 and 2023 and presenter of the annual Fiver Awards held in London.

In July 2019, she appeared in the WriteOn production Sink or Swim at the Corpus Playroom, Cambridge.

== Filmography ==
Year	Title	Role	Notes
1999	Backstage	Herself	Sports presenter
2000	Backstage	Herself	Sports presenter
2000–2006	Blue Peter	Herself	Main presenter
2004	Carrie's War	Extra	Minor role
2005	Totally Blue Peter	Main character	Two-part drama
2006	Totally Doctor Who	Herself	Main presenter alongside Barney Harwood
2007	Buzz! Junior: Jungle Party	Herself	Voiceover
2024	Harvey Greenfield Is Running Late	Alice	Lead female
