= Muppet Monster Adventure =

2000 video game

- European cover art
- Developer: Magenta Software
- Publishers: EU: Sony Computer Entertainment; NA: Midway Games
- Director: Dave Allsopp
- Producers: David Bergantino; Bret Nelson
- Composer: Michael Giacchino
- Platform: PlayStation
- Release: EU: 20 October 2000; NA: 7 November 2000
- Genre: Platform
- Mode: Single-player

Muppet Monster Adventure is a 2000 platform video game developed by Magenta Software and published by Sony Computer Entertainment for the PlayStation. It was developed under Psygnosis' licence of The Muppets franchise. The player controls Robin The Frog as he attempts to save The Muppets from becoming permanently monsters.

The gameplay is reminiscent of popular 3D collectathon platformers of the time.

The game has received mixed reviews, with praise for the game's polish and fun factor and mixed reactions towards the games soundtrack and gameplay.

== Plot ==
Robin the Frog is delighted that he and the Muppets are finally going on a vacation, but his hopes are dashed, when he realizes their destination is a creepy castle. His Uncle Kermit reminds him that they had to accompany Dr. Bunsen Honeydew to hear the reading of his uncle's will. After becoming frightened of his surroundings and the door of the castle being opened by a mysterious figure, Robin faints.

He wakes up to see Pepe the King Prawn, Beaker and Dr. Bunsen Honeydew in some sort of underground laboratory, and Honeydew explains that that after Robin fainted, the group of Muppets was ambushed and many of them were transformed into monsters by the castle's 'evil energy', which has begun infecting the surrounding village, causing it to become twisted and evil.

Honeydew then gives Robin a special 'Power Glove' and backpack to free the village from the evil energy, and keep it from spreading any further. He then sends Robin on his way to collect evil energy from the village and try to save the Muppets from being monsters forever.

Robin fights his way through the innards and grounds of the Castle von Honeydew itself, and the surroundings areas, including a forest, desert, and snowy mountains facing off against (and thereby rescuing), the other muppets, namely Gonzo, who has turned into the vampire "Noseferatu", the "Wocka Wocka Wearbear", who is really Fozzie Bear, "Ker-Monster" (a spoof of Frankenstein's monster), who is his uncle Kermit, the Muck Monster who is really Clifford, and finally, the "Ghoul-friend of Ker-Monster" (a spoof of Bride of Frankenstein), who's actually Miss Piggy.

Having saved his friends and believing his journey to be complete, Robin returns to the center of the castle, only to find Baron Petri von Honeydew himself (who has the appearance of Erik from The Phantom of the Opera). Robin manages to turn the Baron's projectiles against him and finally lays his mad soul to rest.

He is awoken once again by Dr. Bunsen Honeydew. This time however, all the other Muppets are with him and seemingly unchanged. Turns out the figure Robin fainted at was the butler, Chives. He then exclaims that he has had the most amazing dream and describes his adventure to all those present. However, as he and the group ascend the stairs and pass a painting of the late Baron von Honeydew, the painting appears to move and the Power Glove suddenly appears on Robin's hand again, indicating his adventure may well have been something real after all.

== Gameplay ==
The game draws heavy inspiration from 3D platformers like Spyro, Crash Bandicoot, and Super Mario 64. The gameplay consists of Robin using several context-specific transformations inspired by the monster transformations the Muppets themselves undergo. Robin can use the transformations once he has collected all four pieces of an amulet bearing the relevant Muppet's face. Noseferatu's amulet grants Robin the power to glide, the Wocka Wocka Werebear's enables him to climb, the Muck Monster's allows him to dive underwater, Ker-monster's permits him to push and pull large blocks, and the amulet bearing the Ghoul-friend of Ker-monster gives him the ability to perform door-smashing karate chops.

Each level requires a certain amount of 'evil energy' (dropped by enemies and scattered freely around all levels) to open it, and only three may be unlocked before a boss has to be fought. Bosses, however, do not require the collection of evil energy but instead need "Muppet Tokens." Once a set number of these have been collected from levels and minigames, the boss is accessible and can be defeated, opening up the next stage of the game.

== Reception ==
Reception

Aggregate score
Aggregator	Score
GameRankings	71%

Review scores
Publication	Score
AllGame	3.5/5
Edge	6/10
Electronic Gaming Monthly	7/10
GameSpot	7.3/10
IGN	6.5/10
PlayStation Official Magazine – UK	5/10
Official U.S. PlayStation Magazine	4/5

The game received average reviews according to the review aggregation website GameRankings. GameSpot's Scott Steinberg called it 'surprisingly polished and enjoyable', but was unimpressed by the game's sound effects and 'forgettable' soundtrack. Jeremy Conrad of IGN disagreed with Steinberg's verdict on the soundtrack, deeming it 'probably the best part of the entire game', but found the gameplay 'isn't really anything we haven't seen before'.
