= Eliminator (1998 video game) =

1999 video game

- North American PlayStation box art
- Developer: Magenta Software
- Publisher: Psygnosis
- Platforms: PlayStation, Windows
- Release: PlayStation: NA: 17 February 1999; EU: 28 February 1999; Windows: EU: 19 February 1999; NA: 1999
- Genre: Shooter
- Modes: Single-player, multiplayer

Eliminator is a 1999 shooter game developed by Magenta Software and published by Psygnosis for the PlayStation and Microsoft Windows.

== Reception ==
Reception

Aggregate score
Aggregator	Score
GameRankings	34%

Review scores
Publication	Score
AllGame	2.5/5
CNET Gamecenter	2/10
Electronic Gaming Monthly	4/10
GamePro	(PC) 2.5/5
GameSpot	4.2/10
GameStar	(PC) 34%
IGN	4/10
Official U.S. PlayStation Magazine	1.5/5
PC Games (DE)	(PC) 18%
PC Zone	(PC) 30%

The PlayStation version received unfavorable reviews according to the review aggregation website GameRankings.
