= Juan Roget =

Possible inventor of the telescope

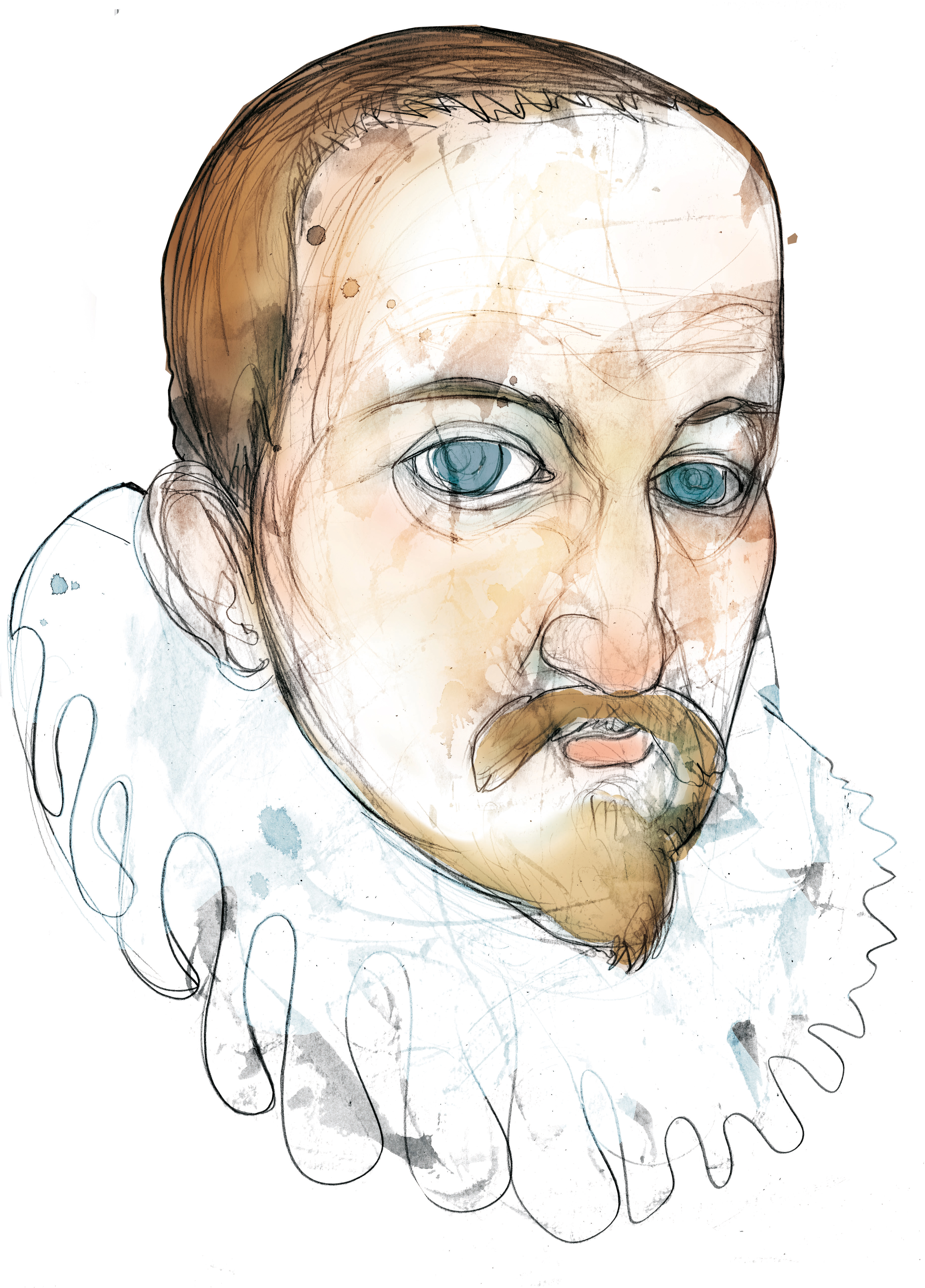

Juan Roget or Joan Roget (Angoulême, France c.1550 - Aveyron, France? c.1617-1624) was a spectacle maker in Girona, Catalonia, Spain who has been cited as a possible inventor of the telescope.

== Biography ==
Juan Roget was born in Angoulême, France, and was the son of a cloth carder Ramón Roget. According to the Catalan optometrist and amateur historian Simón de Guilleuma, Juan was married to Joana of Malaville, France, and migrated to the city of Girona, Principality of Catalonia, Spain, where he worked as a master spectacle maker. His brother Pere Roget, also a spectacle maker, settled in Barcelona by the Plaça del Blat and two of Pere's children also became master spectacle makers. The register of deaths of Rodez Cathedral in Aveyron list the death of Joana Roget as August 7, 1614. There is no register record of Juan Roget's death but the register book for deaths between 1617 and 1624 is missing, giving him a probable death date between those two dates.

== Family tree ==
Ramón Roget; *15xx †16xx
Joana de Malaville; *15xx †7-8-1614	Joan Roget *c.1550 †c.1617-1624	Pere Roget; *15xx †16xx	Caterina Isern; *15xx †16xx
Joan Roget; *15xx †16xx	Magí Roget; *15xx †16xx	Miquel Roget; *15xx †16xx

== Telescope claims ==
A 1959 research paper by Simón de Guilleuma claimed that evidence he had uncovered pointed to the French born spectacle maker, Juan Roget, as the inventor of the telescope before Hans Lipperhey's patent application for the same device in October 1608 and that Dutch spectacle makers had copied Roget's device. Guilleuma referenced a book published in 1618, "Telescopium: sive ars perficiendi novum illud Galilaei visorium instrumentum ad sydera in tres partes divisa" (Telescope, or a performance of the art and means to Galileos's new vision of the stars, in three volumes) by Italian author Hieronymi Sirturi Mediolanensis (aka Girolamo Sirtori of Milan) in which the author describes a 1609 meeting with a "withered old" spectacle maker in Girona named "Roget" who claimed to have invented the telescope. Simón de Guilleuma researched the register of deaths of Rodez Cathedral in Aveyron and found that there was a "Roget" family of spectacle makers, leading him to conclude that the spectacle maker in the Sirtori story was Juan Roget.

In 1979, Dr. Lopez Piñero in his book Ciencia y técnica en la sociedad española de los siglos XVI y XVII explains that Simón de Guilleuma, solidly based on archival data, provided the documentary evidence that, before 1593, "long-range glasses" had been built in those workshops. In March of that year Pedro de Cardona, a prominent personality of the citizen oligarchy, and left among his assets a "long eyeglass decorated with brass" (ullera llarga guarnida de llautó), carefully described by the clerk, who even highlights its optics and its elongated frame of about twenty centimeters (in units of its time). This instrument, which was surely an offering of the builder, became the possession of his widow who later has left it to his son. A few years later, evidence emerges that other such devices were in the possession of several well-known merchants of Barcelona. Jaume Galvany had an "eyeglass/telescope for long sight" (ullera de llarga vista) that was sold at auction after his death (1608) for five sous. Honorato Graner, who died in 1613, also possessed a "tin telescope for viewing the moon" ("ullera de llauna per mirar de Lluny").

The claim was further investigated by writer Nick Pelling in an October 2008 History Today magazine article, in which he attempted to reconstruct the movements of Lipperhey and the other Dutch inventors before the patent application, and found that a connection with Roget was plausible. Other evidence that de Guilleuma presented was tracing the use of the word "ulleras" (a word for "eyeglass" that later became a word for "telescope") which he thought established priority in a 10 April 1593 will from Barcelona where a man bequeathed a "long eyeglass decorated with brass" to his wife. Pelling agreed in a BBC interview that this could also describe a magnifying glass, adding that the reference to an "eyeglass/telescope for long sight" from 1608 sounds more like a Roget telescope.

== See also ==
- History of the telescope
