= Cohort Studios =

Scottish video game developer

Cohort Studios Ltd
- Company type: Video Game Developer
- Industry: Video games
- Founded: March 2006
- Defunct: 2011
- Fate: Bankruptcy
- Headquarters: Cardiff, Wales
- Key people: Darran Thomas
- Owner: Darran Thomas
- Website: http://www.cohortstudios.com

Cohort Studios was a Scottish video game developer based in Dundee. It closed down in 2011.

Formed in 2006, by Lol Scragg, Darran Thomas and Bruce McNeish, Cohort's first project involved being contracted by Sony Computer Entertainment Europe to assist on MotorStorm for PlayStation 3. This was followed with work on Go! Puzzle for PlayStation Network on both PlayStation 3 and PlayStation Portable. In addition, the company developed a small downloadable driving title which was used on the website of the Audi TT.

Early in 2008, Cohort Studios released Buzz! Junior: Dino Den for the PlayStation 2 followed later in the year with Buzz! Junior: Ace Racers. Also in 2008, they won the contract for re-developing three of the PS2 Buzz! Junior titles to be distributed via the PlayStation Network for the PlayStation 3. The titles were to feature 5 of the best mini-games as well as including trophy support and the ability to use a DualShock wireless controller instead of Buzzers.

In October 2010, the company released The Shoot on the PlayStation 3 platform, published by SCEE. The title was one of the first titles to use Sony's new PlayStation Move controller based around the concept of being a movie action hero on a movie set.

On 21 April 2011 Cohort announced that the studio was closing due to "a declining console marketplace". Prior to closing Cohort managed to release the two PlayStation minis titles it had been working on namely, Cohort Chess, and Me Monstar: Hear me Roar!.

== Games ==
- MotorStorm (PS3, 2006) - Outsourcing for Evolution Studios
- Go! Puzzle (PS3 & PSP, 2007) - Working with Zoonami
- Journeys Through Sound (PC, 2007) - Free downloadable game celebrating the Audi TT relaunch
- Burnout Paradise (PS3 & Xbox 360, 2007) - Outsourcing for Criterion Games
- Buzz! Junior: Dino Den (PS2, 2008)
- Buzz! Junior: Ace Racers (PS2, 2008)
- Buzz! Junior: Robo Jam (PS3, 2009)
- Buzz! Junior: Robo Jam (PS2, 2007)
- Buzz! Junior: Jungle Party (PS3, 2009)
- Buzz! Junior: Monster Rumble (PS3, 2009)
- Buzz! Junior: Dino Den (PS3, 2009)
- The Shoot (PS3, 2010)
- Cohort Chess (PlayStation Mini, 2011)
- Me Monstar: Hear me Roar! (PlayStation Mini, 2011)
