= Ubisoft Leamington =

British video game developer

- Formerly: FreeStyleGames Limited (2002–2017)
- Type: Subsidiary
- Industry: Video games
- Founded: 29 November 2002; 23 years ago in Warwick, England
- Founders: Alex Darby; Alex Zoro; David Osbourn; Jamie Jackson; Jonny Ambrose; Phil Hindle
- Defunct: 1 April 2025; 18 months ago
- Headquarters: Leamington Spa, England
- Key people: Lisa Opie (managing director)
- Products: DJ Hero series; Guitar Hero series
- Number of employees: 50 (2016)
- Parent: Activision (2008–2017); Ubisoft (2017–2025)
- Website: leamington.ubisoft.com

Ubisoft Leamington (formerly FreeStyleGames Limited) was a British video game developer and a studio of Ubisoft based in Leamington Spa. Founded in November 2002 by six industry veterans formerly of Codemasters and Rare, the studio was bought by Activision in September 2008. In January 2017, Ubisoft acquired the studio from Activision and renamed it Ubisoft Leamington. Ubisoft Leamington worked on AAA games in a supporting capacity, primarily the Tom Clancy's The Division franchise, in close cooperation with sister studio Ubisoft Reflections.

In January 2025, Ubisoft announced a series of layoffs that would ultimately affect the Leamington studio, which officially shutdown after a consultation process on 1 April 2025.

== History ==
=== Early years (2002–2008) ===
FreeStyleGames logo, 2002–2017

FreeStyleGames was founded on 29 November 2002 by Alex Darby, David Osbourn, Phil Hindle and Jamie Jackson, formerly of Codemasters, and Alex Zoro and Jonny Ambrose, formerly of Rare.

Their first title, B-Boy, a game of competitive break-dancing, was published and distributed by Sony Computer Entertainment Europe in Europe in 2006, and published by Evolved Games and distributed by SouthPeak Games in North America in 2008. B-Boy features Crazy Legs of the Rock Steady Crew, as well as many other well known b-boys from around the World. It won the IGN best of E3 2006 award for best PSP music game.

=== As part of Activision (2008–2017) ===
On 12 September 2008, FreeStyleGames was purchased by Activision for an undisclosed sum, following a period of commercial cooperation, mainly involving localised downloadable content for the Guitar Hero series.

The first game the company developed under Activision's ownership was DJ Hero (2009), a spin-off of the Guitar Hero series, in which players used a turntable-based controller to mimic the actions of a disc jockey across numerous songs. The title was considered successful, and they completed DJ Hero 2 the following year, though around that time, the rhythm game genre was suffering from a glut of releases and was in decline, and Activision had decided to end further production of any Guitar Hero title. The company had to lay off some employees during this time, but still were financially viable with success of Sing Party (2012) on the Wii U, which was a collaborative effort with Nintendo. As Sing Party's development was wrapping up, Activision approached FreeStyleGames to have them consider how to reboot the Guitar Hero franchise. FreeStyleGames developed a new guitar controller atypical of ones that has been created to that point, and crafted a different approach towards presenting the game to players through a first-person perspective full-motion video. This work culminated in Guitar Hero Live (2015), the first new Guitar Hero title for the eighth generation of video game consoles.

While Guitar Hero Live was praised by critics, it failed to have significant sales, falling short of Activision's projections. On 1 April 2016, it was announced that around 50 staff were made redundant as part of a reshuffle by Activision. Founders Jackson and Osbourn opted to leave the studio at that point, disappointed in how development studios are treated when games are not financially successful, and along with two of the laid-off staff, Jonathan Napier and Gareth Morrison, formed a new studio, Slingshot Cartel. This studio anticipates developing games in a process more akin to filmmaking, something that the studio had to do during the course of development of Guitar Hero Live, which they seem can better streamline the process and reduce costs for game production.

=== As Ubisoft Leamington (2017–2025) ===
On 18 January 2017, French publisher Ubisoft acquired the studio from Activision, and renamed it Ubisoft Leamington, referencing its Leamington Spa location. Under this new owner, Ubisoft Leamington worked closely with Newcastle-upon-Tyne-based partner studio Ubisoft Reflections, another studio acquired by Ubisoft and rebranded.

A proposal to close the studio as part of ongoing cost-cutting measures was announced on 27 January 2025. The studio officially closed its doors on 1 April 2025 following the conclusion of the consultation process, with staff not affected moving to fully remote contracts.

== Games developed ==
Year	Title	Platform(s)
2006	B-Boy	PlayStation 2, PlayStation Portable
2007	Buzz! Junior: Monster Rumble	PlayStation 2
2007	Buzz! Junior: Robo Jam	PlayStation 2
2009	DJ Hero	PlayStation 2, PlayStation 3, Wii, Xbox 360
2010	DJ Hero 2	PlayStation 3, Wii, Xbox 360
2012	Sing Party	Wii U
2015	Guitar Hero Live	iOS, PlayStation 3, PlayStation 4, tvOS, Wii U, Xbox 360, Xbox One
2015	Skylanders: Battlecast	Android, iOS
2016	Call of Duty Online	Microsoft Windows
2016	Call of Duty: Infinite Warfare	PlayStation 4, Xbox One
2017	Tom Clancy's The Division	PlayStation 4, Xbox One
2019	Far Cry 5	Microsoft Windows, PlayStation 4, Xbox One
2019	Starlink: Battle for Atlas	Nintendo Switch, PlayStation 4, Xbox One
2019	Tom Clancy's The Division 2	Microsoft Windows, PlayStation 4, Xbox One
2023	Avatar: Frontiers of Pandora	PlayStation 5, Xbox Series X/S
2023	Assassin's Creed Nexus VR	Oculus Quest 2
2024	Skull and Bones	PlayStation 5, Xbox Series X/S
2024	Star Wars Outlaws	PlayStation 5, Xbox Series X/S
2025	Assassin's Creed Shadows	PlayStation 5, Xbox Series X/S
