= Magenta Software =

English video game developer

- Type: Private
- Industry: Video games
- Founded: 1994
- Headquarters: Liverpool, England
- Products: Buzz! Junior
- Subsidiaries: Cosmonaut Studios

Magenta Software was a video game developer based in Liverpool, England.

== History ==
It was founded in 1994. The company specializes in developing family-friendly video games based on various existing franchises, as well as the Buzz! Junior series for Sony Interactive Entertainment. It went on an indefinite hiatus since 2015, during which they purchased Cosmonaut Studios, whose game Eternal Threads was released by Secret Mode in 2022.

== List of Games ==
Title	Format(s)	Released
Eliminator	PS1, Microsoft Windows	1998
Muppet Monster Adventure	PS1	2000
Disney's Treasure Planet	PS1	2002
Stuart Little 2	PS1	2002
Dr. Seuss' The Cat in the Hat	PS2, Xbox, Microsoft Windows	2003
Stuart Little 3: Big Photo Adventure	PS2	2005
Buzz! Junior: Jungle Party	PS2, PS3, PSP	2006
Buzz! Junior: Robo Jam	PS2, PS3	2007
Buzz! Junior: Monster Rumble	PS2, PS3	2007
Disney Th!nk Fast	PS2, Nintendo Wii	2008
InviZimals: The Lost Kingdom	PS3	2014

== Awards ==
In November 2007 the company won a British Academy Children's BAFTA for Buzz! Junior: Jungle Party.
