= Sing Party =

2012 video game

- North American box art
- Developers: Nintendo SPD; FreeStyleGames
- Publisher: Nintendo
- Platform: Wii U
- Release: NA: 18 November 2012; EU: 18 January 2013
- Genre: Music
- Modes: Single-player, multiplayer

Sing Party (stylized as SiNG PARTY) is a music party video game developed by Nintendo and FreeStyleGames and published by Nintendo for the Wii U. It was released in North America as a Wii U launch title in November 2012, and later in Europe in January 2013.

Sing Party is a karaoke-style game that features 50 licensed songs from various artists such as Fleetwood Mac, Lady Gaga, Queen, and Rihanna. The game requires the use of the Wii U karaoke microphone, which was bundled with all physical editions of the game in addition to also being available for purchase separately. Previous licensed microphones used with singing games for Wii are also compatible with the game. Sing Party received generally mixed reviews from critics.

== Gameplay ==
Like other karaoke games, players would sing to the lyrics of the available songs and get scored based on their rhythm, however Sing Party permits multiple people to play along with the lead singing player.

The game includes a variety of different modes. In Party Mode, lead singers read the song lyrics on the Wii U GamePad, allowing them to face the other players, which represent the lead singers' audience, and the lead singers can move around the room instead of staring at the television screen. The other players joins in the fun by following the cues from the physical performance of the lead singers, singing the background vocals and dancing along with the moves shown on the television screen.

In Sing Mode, players can sing by themselves or as a duet with harmonies. As the song is performed, their vocal qualities are scored and evaluated on the TV in real time.

In Team Mode, players can split into two groups, which lets players face off against their musical rivals as they rotate through different game modes.

=== Track list ===
The following is a list of the 50 songs available in Sing Party. Nintendo advertised plans to release more songs as DLC starting in early 2013, though none were ever released.

Song	Artist	Released
"Call Me Maybe"	Carly Rae Jepsen	2011
"Glad You Came"	The Wanted	2011
"Le Freak"	Chic	1978
"Party Rock Anthem"	LMFAO	2011
"The Edge of Glory"	Lady Gaga	2011
"The Shoop Shoop Song (It's in His Kiss)"	Betty Everett	1964
"Only Girl (In The World)"	Rihanna	2010
"I Want You Back"	The Jackson 5	1969
"I Got You (I Feel Good)"	James Brown	1965
"Y.M.C.A."	Village People	1978
"Love You Like A Love Song"	Selena Gomez & the Scene	2011
"Baby"	Justin Bieber feat. Ludacris	2010
"Don't Stop Me Now"	Queen	1979
"Go Your Own Way"	Fleetwood Mac	1976
"Kids in America"	Kim Wilde	1981
"Ironic"	Alanis Morissette	1996
"So Good"	B.o.B	2012
"Surfin' U.S.A."	The Beach Boys	1963
"Just The Way You Are"	Bruno Mars	2010
"Jar of Hearts"	Christina Perri	2010
"I Believe in a Thing Called Love"	The Darkness	2003
"Groove Is in the Heart"	Deee-Lite featuring Q-Tip and Bootsy Collins	1990
"Mercy"	Duffy	2008
"Theme from New York, New York"	Frank Sinatra	1980
"You've Got the Love"	Florence + The Machine	2009
"I Will Survive"	Gloria Gaynor	1978
"Alone"	Heart	1987
"The Power of Love"	Huey Lewis and the News	1985
"Flashdance... What a Feeling"	Irene Cara	1983
"I'm Yours"	Jason Mraz	2008
"Walking on Sunshine"	Katrina and the Waves	1985
"Firework"	Katy Perry	2010
"Just a Kiss"	Lady A	2011
"Satellite"	Lena	2010
"Dancing on the Ceiling"	Lionel Richie	1986
"Haven't Met You Yet"	Michael Bublé	2009
"The Climb"	Miley Cyrus	2009
"Daydream Believer"	The Monkees	1967
"How You Remind Me"	Nickelback	2001
"Don't Hold Your Breath"	Nicole Scherzinger	2011
"Always on My Mind"	Pet Shop Boys	1987
"All About Tonight"	Pixie Lott	2011
"Show Me Love"	Robin S.	1993
"You Can't Hurry Love"	The Supremes	1966
"Higher"	Taio Cruz featuring Kylie Minogue	2010
"Don't Leave Me This Way"	Thelma Houston	1975
"I Think We're Alone Now"	Tiffany	1987
"Love Shack"	The B-52's	1989
"Dancing in the Street"	Mick Jagger and David Bowie	1985
"Ain't That a Kick in the Head"	Robbie Williams	2001

== Reception ==
Reception

Aggregate score
Aggregator	Score
Metacritic	60/100

Review scores
Publication	Score
IGN	6.3/10
Nintendo Life	5/10

Sing Party has received mixed reviews. The game received a score of 60/100 on review aggregator website Metacritic, indicating “mixed or average reviews”. IGN has given the game a 6.3 out of 10, saying that "while one person steps up as the main performer, others can dance, sing and clap along with the prompts on the TV screen making sure everyone at the party is rocking out together." Nintendo Life gave the game a 5/10 score, praising the flashy graphics and gamepad use, but criticising the game for lacking identity.
