= Buzz!: The Hollywood Quiz =

2007 video game

- European box art
- Developer: Relentless Software
- Publisher: Sony Computer Entertainment
- Series: Buzz!
- Engine: RenderWare
- Platform: PlayStation 2
- Release: EU: 19 October 2007; AU: 25 October 2007; NA: 11 March 2008
- Genre: Party
- Modes: Single-player, multiplayer

Buzz!: The Hollywood Quiz is a party video game developed by Relentless Software and published by Sony Computer Entertainment for the PlayStation 2. It is the fifth instalment in the Buzz! series. Players have to answer questions asked by the quiz master (the eponymous Buzz) using the four Buzz! buzzers.

There are two games available in the single-player mode, which are Time Builder, where answering questions will gain time in the final round, and Hotseat, where players must answer as many questions as they can, using the time they accumulated in Round 1. To gain points, players must bank when appropriate. If they get a question wrong, they lose all the points they did not bank.

== Rounds ==
=== Hollywood Stars ===
Similar to 'Point Picker', players choose a category on a big wheel to determine the next questions to be asked. Then each player answers the question to earn points.

=== Fastest Finger ===
A photo clue appears on screen and players then have to buzz in with the correct answer as quickly as possible. The less time taken to answer, the more points awarded to the player if the answer is correct.

=== Fact or Fiction ===
The players are presented with a "true or false" type question. They then have to answer accordingly.

=== Top Rank ===
Players put four answers into the correct order as fast as they can to score points. When all players have made a selection, the correct order is revealed. Points are awarded based on speed of answering.

=== Pie Fight ===
The first contestant to answer a question correctly wins the chance to throw a cream pie at an opponent. Each player can be hit by a pie twice before they're out. Points are awarded in reverse order of elimination, i.e. the last player standing or eliminated wins more points than the player who was (previously) eliminated.

=== Rollover ===
Contestants get to choose a category to answer questions from. The contestant with the lowest score chooses first, followed by the contestant with the next lowest score. When the questions arrive, if a player gets one of their questions wrong, the points they could have won are put into a kitty. The next contestant to answer a question correctly will pick up all of the points in the kitty generated by other players wrong answers.

=== Point Stealer ===
A picture, a question and some possible answers are slowly revealed. Players must buzz in when they think they know the answer. If the answer is right, they get to steal 500 points from an opponent. If it's wrong, they're out until the next question.

=== The Final Countdown ===
The points that players have amassed during the previous rounds are converted into bars of time which gradually tick down. Answering a question correctly temporarily halts the countdown, but when a player's bar ticks down to zero, they are eliminated from the competition. Bonus time is awarded for being the first to answer correctly, while a chunk of time is removed for each incorrect answer. The object of the round is to be the last contestant standing, thus becoming the overall winner of Buzz!: The Hollywood Quiz.

== Reception ==
Reception

Aggregate score
Aggregator	Score
Metacritic	77/100

Review scores
Publication	Score
Destructoid	7.5/10
Eurogamer	7/10
GamesRadar+	4/5
GameZone	7.4/10
IGN	8.3/10
Jeuxvideo.com	14/20
PlayStation Official Magazine – UK	7/10
PALGN	7/10
PlayStation: The Official Magazine	3/5
VideoGamer.com	8/10

The game received "generally favourable reviews" according to the review aggregation website Metacritic. Greg Miller of IGN said Relentless Software could have just stuck with the same style as the previous games, but instead chose a new style that was an obvious change right from the very first menu. He praised the improvement of the characters, although their graphics still had a jaggyness about them, but admitted that this was probably more the cause of the PS2 holding the game back. In summing up he said the game was deep, fun and more polished than previous Buzz! titles.
