= Buzz!: The Music Quiz =

2005 video game

- European box art
- Developer: Relentless Software
- Publisher: Sony Computer Entertainment
- Designer: Paul Woodbridge
- Programmer: Paul Brooke
- Artist: Greg Sue
- Series: Buzz!
- Engine: RenderWare
- Platform: PlayStation 2
- Release: EU: 21 October 2005; AU: 27 October 2005
- Genres: Party, quiz, music
- Modes: Single-player, multiplayer

Buzz!: The Music Quiz is a party music video game developed by Relentless Software and published by Sony Computer Entertainment for the PlayStation 2. It is the first instalment of the Buzz! series and was released exclusively in Europe and Australia. In The Music Quiz, players answer questions asked by the host, Buzz, by using the four Buzz! buzzers.

== Gameplay ==
Buzz!: The Music Quiz is a music quiz trivia game for up to four players. The game is set in a fictional TV studio, and hosted by the characters Buzz and his assistant Rose. Each copy of the game comes with a total of four buzzer controllers, which are plugged into the USB slots on the Sony PlayStation 2 console. They feature a sizable red button on top and four colored buttons below, sorted in descending order. Buzz can pick around 5000 questions from a 50-year period of pop music, supported by 1000 music clips which represent parts of the original songs processed by a synthesizer, and appear without any lyrics or vocal support. The questions range from the name of the performer, title, or year of the release, to details about the artist.

The players may choose the overall length of the game (15, 30, or 45 minutes) and the type of questions being asked (older music, newer music, or both). If there is a score tie by the end of the quiz, a tie-breaker round will start. Besides the main game, there are other two modes: Quickfire Quiz and Quizmaster Quiz. Quickfire Quiz bypasses the rounds system, and instead, it will present questions where only the fastest responding player can answer by pressing the buzzer. Whoever manages to reach the target score first wins the game. In Quizmaster Quiz, one of the players becomes a quizmaster, who gets to choose the questions the others will have to answer. The buzzers will show the quizmaster who was the fastest, so he could distribute the points accordingly with a DualShock 2 controller. Players are represented by their choice of 16 on-screen avatars who portray contestants on the game show, resembling musicians such as Elvis Presley, Geri Halliwell, Kylie Minogue, Billie Joe Armstrong, Liam Gallagher, and Barry White. Once selected, the game starts with an intro sequence that is generated depending on the contestants, showing how they all arrive on the set in a black limousine while being cheered on by the crowd.

=== Rounds ===
Once the game starts, Buzz leads the players through several rounds, each of which contains different objectives and rules. There are eight types of rounds:

- Point Builder – The goal is to select an answer before the time runs out, and everyone who answers correctly receives the points.
- Snap – The players need to pick the right answer from options that randomly appear on the screen.
- Fastest Finger – This requires the contestants to answer as quickly as possible, with the first correct answer receiving the most points.
- Pass The Bomb – The player must answer a question correctly to pass the bomb away to another player. The one holding the bomb when it explodes loses a certain number of points.
- Offloader – Each player can receive bonus points for guessing which of the other participants answered correctly on the current question.
- Buzz Stop – Conceptually the same as Snap, but players have to press the buzz button when theirs are lit. Whoever presses the buzz button correctly gets the chance to answer the given question or pass it to another player.
- Point Stealer – Players who make a correct answer will take points from a selected opponent.
- Look Before You Leap – The questions and their answers are progressively revealed.

== Development ==
After the success of EyeToy and SingStar, Sony intended to expand further into the social gaming market. A pop quiz game was a good fit with their plans, so they started collaborating with Sleepydog, who gathered the clips and designed the questions. Sony contacted Relentless Software and asked whether they'd be interested in making a title of that kind. About 30 developers worked on The Music Quiz, trying to create something that would be appealing without intimidating casual gamers. In order to reach their intended audience, Relentless sought the simplest possible interface for four players. They developed a design for a set of buzzers as a game controller, though they were concerned that it would be too expensive for the publisher. Sony provided the team with a prototype a few months later. The host, Buzz, wasn't inspired by anything in particular, but the intention was to make him more facetious and cheesy. Somethin' Else directed the game's audio. Jason Donovan was chosen to portray Buzz through voice acting.

Initially, the game was to feature a group of unconventional characters as contestants and hosts, such as a tooth, a clam, and a hot dog. Sony wanted Relentless to change these to make the game more accessible, prompting a design shift to music-celebrity stereotypes. Relentless envisioned around 30 different quiz games, which was pared to 8 by the end of development. The co-founder of Relentless believed that the buzzers included in the package influenced The Music Quiz's success, as they were simple and made the game stand out from competing titles.

The game was announced on 18 May 2005 with a scheduled release date of October 2005 in Europe. After that, it was showcased around the same time at E3 2005.

== Reception ==
Reception

Review scores
Publication	Score
4Players	85%
Eurogamer	8/10
Jeuxvideo.com	12/20
Gry Online	7.5/10
Multiplayer.it	7.9/10
Meristation	8/10

=== Critical response ===
The Music Quiz was well received by critics. Kristan Reed of Eurogamer called it a "great new addition" to Sony's family-friendly genre and the "best quiz game ever released by a mile". Randolph Ramsay of CNET noted that although it has certain flaws, it is a "fun game that will win fans of all ages and musical tastes". Nacho Ortiz of MeriStation called it "a different, innovative and fresh title". Fabio Palmisano of Multiplayer.it considered it "the best you could wish for from a trivia game". Jeuxvideo.com thought that it managed to stand out in the genre of quiz games. Paul Kautz of 4Players declared it a valid successor to You Don't Know Jack.

The presentation, particularly the character designs and the display of the game show itself, received mostly positive reactions. Reed wrote that The Music Quiz replicated all game show clichés with an over the top and self-mocking tone. He added that the cheesiness bundled with an "irritating host" turned out well. Ramsay called the characters "well defined and colorful", comparing Buzz with Guy Smiley. Ortiz noted that the game contains retro influences with a lot of atmosphere and immersion. Krzysztof Gonciarz of Gry Online found the characters relatively appealing, but nothing special in terms of design. Kautz thought that while the characters were animated in a funny way, the game needed more enthusiasm in terms of acoustics and the host.

The reviewers were disappointed with the quality of the music clips. John Hoogerwaard of Trouw called them "simple imitation", and Reed felt that because none were sourced from their artists, they weren't initially recognizable. Ramsey stated that the clips reminded him of low-quality muzak versions of songs.

Reed found the buzzers comfortable and easy to use with just one hand, albeit insubstantial, and Ramsay felt that their inclusion a "welcome novelty".

=== Sales ===
The game debuted in the top 20 on the United Kingdom's video game chart and climbed into the top 10, before a steep decline caused it to leave the charts. Relentless was at that point working on Buzz! The Big Quiz and received a call from Sony saying that The Big Quiz could likely be the last in the series. However, The Music Quiz returned to the top 20 during the Christmas and New Year holiday period. According to Relentless creative director David Amor, the game's peak sales occurred in the week after Christmas.

The game received platinum certification from the Entertainment and Leisure Software Publishers Association (ELSPA), indicating at least 300,000 copies sold in the United Kingdom.
