= Buzz!: The BIG Quiz =

2006 video game

- Box art
- Developer: Relentless Software
- Publisher: Sony Computer Entertainment
- Series: Buzz!
- Platform: PlayStation 2
- Release: EU: 17 March 2006
- Genres: Party, quiz
- Modes: Single-player, multiplayer

Buzz!: The BIG Quiz is a 2006 party video game developed by Relentless Software and published by Sony Computer Entertainment for the PlayStation 2. It is the second installment in the Buzz! series

Initial promotional material had it named Buzz! The Uber Quiz, however Sony Computer Entertainment announced the change upon the game's launch. The format is essentially that of the original: Buzz!: The Music Quiz. However, The Big Quiz covers an extensive range of general knowledge questions, including geography, history, sport, television, movies, as well as music. Buzz!: The Big Quiz was released exclusively in Europe.

The Big Quiz was released in the UK on 17 March 2006. In the same year it won a BAFTA for best casual and social game.

== Rounds ==
=== Multiplayer ===
- Point Builder – Select an answer from four options.
- Snap – Select an answer from options that appear on the screen in a random order. You lose points in this round for a wrong answer.
- Fastest Finger – You score more points for being the fastest person to answer.
- Pass the Bomb – Answer a question correctly to pass the bomb. The person holding the bomb when it goes off loses points.
- Ask A Friend – This round gets each player to nominate a friend to answer the question for them. If they choose wisely both will receive points but if they nominate someone not-in-the-know then both will suffer.
- Hitman – This round sees the players fighting each other for a chance to obtain a gun and shoot at an opponent of their choice. Each player has three lives and the last player standing gets the most points.
- Point Stealer – Players must buzz when the correct answer appears on the screen. Correctly answering the question allows you to choose a player to steal points from.
- Look Before You Leap – The question and answers are revealed slowly. Players buzz in and choose an answer when they know it.

=== Single player ===
- Time Builder – Answer questions as fast as you can to earn time, which will be used for the next round.
- Hot Seat – Use the total time you earned to answer questions. Try to earn as many points as you can.

== Reception ==
Reception

Review scores
Publication	Score
4Players	73%
Eurogamer	5/10
GameSpot	6.2/10
Jeuxvideo.com	15/20

The PlayStation 2 version of The BIG Quiz received a "Platinum" sales award from the Entertainment and Leisure Software Publishers Association (ELSPA), indicating sales of at least 300,000 copies in the United Kingdom.
