= Buzz! Junior: Jungle Party =

2006 video game

- European PlayStation 2 box art
- Developers: Magenta Software; Cohort Studios (PS3)
- Publisher: Sony Computer Entertainment
- Series: Buzz! Junior
- Platforms: PlayStation 2; PlayStation 3 (PSN); PlayStation Portable
- Release: PlayStation 2: EU: 20 October 2006; NA: 30 October 2007; PlayStation 3: EU: 28 August 2008; NA: 12 March 2009; PlayStation Portable: EU: 5 November 2010
- Genre: Party
- Modes: Single-player, multiplayer

Buzz! Junior: Jungle Party is a party video game developed by Magenta Software and published by Sony Computer Entertainment for the PlayStation 2. It is the first game in the Buzz! Junior series. Jungle Party comprises forty different mini-games (twenty-five in the US version). Many of these mini-games require little knowledge or skill, so that they are more suited to younger children than the normal Buzz! quiz games, although they can also be enjoyed by older children or even adults. Cohort Studios developed a PlayStation 3 version where the player can use a DualShock wireless controller for the first time, yet is limited to only five playable mini-games. A PlayStation Portable version of the game was released in November 2010.

The game received mixed reviews, and was a British Academy Children's Awards winner.

== Gameplay ==
Jungle Party is designed in a way that kids would be able to play it. Up to 4 people can play all the 40 mini-games, with Liz Barker as a narrator. Some of them include skydiving, colour matching, stealing an ostrich's egg and shooting balloons. Each game has a specific objective, with maximum points given by completing twenty of those in one round.

Every player can pick their own coloured monkey, either blue, orange, green or yellow, and controls them using their Buzz! Buzzer. Each controller has four coloured buttons with a red buzzer on top. Some games simply use the Buzz! button, while others use the four coloured buttons. In addition, there is a single-player mode which features customized versions of the multi-player games. After playing through ten games, a final score will be given (out of 80,000 overall) with a ranking on the leaderboard. If the player scores high enough there are 3 extra costumes to unlock. Bronze, Silver and Gold Outfits.

== Reception ==
Reception

Aggregate score
Aggregator	Score
Metacritic	70/100 (PS2)

Review scores
Publication	Score
GameZone	7.2/10
IGN	7/10
Jeuxvideo.com	9/20
PALGN	6/10
VideoGamer.com	8/10

Jungle Party has received "mixed or average" reviews holding an aggregate score of 70% on Metacritic. IGN noted that there was a lot of rehash with just the setting changed, while adding that more variety would probably appeal to a wider audience. VideoGamer wrote that despite the fact that Jungle Party looks pretty simple, it has enough mini-games to keep players interested for a while. Luke Van Leuveren of PALGN thought that single-player part isn't really deep or appealing, with multi-player giving the most entertainment to the players.

Critics found that the controls are responsive, and designed for everyone to use. The transitions between animations and colorful artstyle have been praised. Some reviewers considered the simplicity of the mini-games as something that gives the game a lack of depth and wide appeal.

In November 2007, the game was a winner of the British Academy Children's Awards in the Video Game category.
