= Cuba (disambiguation) =

Cuba is a Caribbean island country.

Cuba may also refer to:

== Places ==
- Cuba Palace, in Palermo, Italy
- Cuba Street, Wellington, a street and a quarter in the Central Business District of Wellington, New Zealand
- Cuba, Portugal, a parish and a municipality and town in the district of Beja
- La Cuba, a municipality in Teruel, Aragon, Spain
- Avon (county), a defunct county in the west of England, where CUBA is an acronym for the "County that Used to Be Avon"
- La Cuba, Cuba, a ward in Palma Soriano, Santiago de Cuba Province

=== United States ===
- Cuba, Alabama
- Cuba, former name of Iceland, California
- Cuba, Georgia
- Cuba, Illinois
- Cuba, Indiana
- Cuba, Owen County, Indiana
- Cuba, Kansas
- Cuba, Kentucky
- Cuba, Minnesota
- Cuba, Missouri, a city in Crawford County
- Cuba, Lafayette County, Missouri, a ghost town
- Cuba, New Mexico
- Cuba (town), New York
  - Cuba (village), New York, in the town of Cuba
- Cuba, Clinton County, Ohio
- Cuba, Putnam County, Ohio
- Cuba, West Virginia
- Cuba City, Wisconsin
- Cuba Lake, a reservoir in New York
- Cuba Township, Becker County, Minnesota
- Cuba Township, Lake County, Illinois
- Cuba Township, Barnes County, North Dakota

== People ==
- Alberto Cuba (born 1962), Cuban long-distance runner
- Paul Cuba (1908–1990), American football player
- Cuba Gooding, Sr. (1944–2017), American soul singer
- Cuba Gooding, Jr. (born 1968), American actor

== Ships ==
- Cuba, a New Zealand Company barque that brought surveyors to Wellington, New Zealand in 1840
- SS Yorktown (1894), rebuilt in 1920 as the turbo-electric propelled passenger ship Cuba
- SS Cuba (1920), formerly the German SS Coblenz (1897), renamed SS Cuba in 1920, that sank in 1923
- SS Cuba (1923), a French liner requisitioned as a UK troopship in 1940 and sunk by U-1195 in 1945

== Storms ==
- 1910 Cuba hurricane, a category four hurricane that stalled west of Cuba, causing devastating flooding
- 1924 Cuba hurricane, a category five hurricane that devastated western Cuba
- 1932 Cuba hurricane, a category five hurricane that devastated Cuba

== Other uses ==
- Cuba (board game), see Havana (board game)
- Cuba (film), a 1979 film
- Cuba (song), a Gibson Brothers song
- Cuba, a 1987 album by the band The Silos
- Chinese University Basketball Association, a basketball league
- Club Universitario de Buenos Aires, a sports club
- A common name for Hemianthus callitrichoides, an aquatic plant
- A Roman goddess; see List of Roman birth and childhood deities
- A synonym for the legume genus Tachigali

== See also ==
- CCUBA (Closed Circuit Underwater Breathing Apparatus), a type of breathing apparatus
- Cuban (disambiguation)
- Kuban People's Republic
- Cube (disambiguation)
- Kuba (disambiguation)
- Quba
