= Cube (disambiguation) =

A cube is any regular, six-sided, three-dimensional solid object.

Cube may also refer to:

== Arts and entertainment ==
- Cube Interactive, an interactive media company in Wales, UK

=== Comics ===
- Cosmic Cube, a fictional object in Marvel Comics

=== Films ===
- Cube (film series), a series of films including:
  - Cube (1997 film), a 1997 Canadian film
  - Cube 2: Hypercube, the 2002 sequel to Cube
  - Cube Zero, the 2004 prequel to Cube
  - Cube (2021 film), a 2021 Japanese remake of the 1997 film
- The Cube (film), a 1969 television film by Jim Henson

=== Games ===
- Cube (video game), a 2001 first-person shooter computer game
- The Cube (video game), a 2012 puzzle video game
- The Cube (game), a psychological exercise in Kokology
- Q*bert, a 1982 arcade game (named Cubes in development)
- Q.U.B.E. (Quick Understanding of Block Extrusion), a 2011 indie puzzler
- Cube (collectible card game variation), a variation of gameplay for collectible card games

=== Music ===
- Cube Entertainment, a South Korean record label
- Cube Records, a British record label
- Cube (talent agency), a Japanese music production company and talent agency
- "Cube" (song), a 2021 song by Gen Hoshino
- The Cube, a retired stage design from Canadian DJ Deadmau5

=== Sculpture ===
- Alamo (sculpture) by Tony Rosenthal, installed in New York City, known as "the Cube"
- Endover, by Rosenthal, installed in Ann Arbor, Michigan, also known as "the Cube"

=== Television ===
- The Cube (British game show), a TV game show where tasks are completed from inside a cube
- The Cube (Australian game show)
- Cube TV, a television channel from South Korea.

== Buildings ==
- The Qube (Detroit), a financial center in Michigan, US
- The Qube (Vancouver), a distinctive "hanging" building in Canada
- The Cube (restaurant), a travelling pop-up restaurant
- The Cube, Birmingham, part of The Mailbox in Birmingham, UK
- Cube Berlin, a modern office building in Berlin
- Cube Microplex, a non-profit cinema and venue in Bristol, UK
- Discovery Cube Orange County, a science museum in Santa Ana, California
- Blue Cube or just Cube, nickname of Onizuka Air Force Station in Sunnyvale CA
- Kaaba (English: "The Cube"), a sacred Islamic site in Mecca, Saudi Arabia
- Mukaab, (English: "Cube"), a proposed skyscraper planned for Riyadh, Saudi Arabia

== Science and technology ==
- Cube (algebra), the third power of a number
- CuBe, an alloy of copper and beryllium
- Cubé, a flowering plant of the legume family
- Data cube, a three- (or higher) dimensional array of values
  - OLAP cube, an extension to a spreadsheet's two-dimensional array optimized for multidimensional analysis
- Cubes (OLAP server), a light-weight open source multidimensional modelling and OLAP toolkit
- Power Mac G4 Cube (2000–2001), a small form factor Apple Macintosh personal computer
- GameCube, a home video game console
- In general topology, the Tychonoff cube

== People ==
- Ice Cube (born 1969), American rapper, often referred to simply as "Cube"
- Irma von Cube (1899–1977), German-American screenwriter
- Mary Cagle (born 1989), American comiccer, known also as Cube or Cube Watermelon.

== Other uses ==
- Cubicle, a type of office workspace
- Cube Bikes, a German bicycle manufacturer
- Nissan Cube, a multi-purpose vehicle from Nissan
- Cubed, 2020 memoir by Ernő Rubik
- CUBE Works, a Japanese company that developed the Otamatone instrument

== See also ==
- Cubic (disambiguation)
- Qube (disambiguation)
- Kube (disambiguation)
- Cuba (disambiguation)
