= Qubba (disambiguation) =

A qubba is a type of domed structure in Islamic architecture.

Qubba, Al-Qubba, or القبة may also refer to:

== Common nouns ==
- قبة, Arabic-language word that may refer to:

- Dome, type of architectural element in general
- Kippah, Jewish head covering

- Alcove (architecture), type of small recessed room, the English-language word for which was borrowed from Arabic

== Places and landmarks ==
- Kouba, Algeria, suburb of Algiers
- Koubbeh Palace, palace in Cairo, Egypt
- El Qobbah, district in the Northern Area of Cairo, Egypt
- Qubeh, village in West Azerbaijan Province, Iran
- Qubbah prison, prison in Tripoli, Lebanon
- Quba District (Libya)

- Al Qubbah, town in and former capital of the district

== Other uses ==
- Beta Coronae Australis, also known as "Alqubba", a solitary K-type star in the constellation Corona Australis
- Al-Nour al-Qubba (fl. 2003–present), Sudanese military officer

== See also ==
- Cuba (disambiguation)
- Guba (disambiguation)
- Kuba (disambiguation)
