= The Qube (disambiguation) =

The Qube may refer to one of two buildings:

- The Qube (Vancouver), a distinctive "hanging" building in British Columbia, Canada
- The Qube (Detroit), formerly the Chase Tower and Bank One, a financial center in Michigan, United States

== See also ==
- Qube (disambiguation)
