= Kube =

KUBE or Kube may refer to:

== Broadcasting ==
- KJR-FM, a radio station (93.3 FM) licensed to serve Seattle, Washington, which held the call sign KUBE-FM from 1982 to 2016 and from 2018 to 2022
- KPWK (AM), a radio station (1350 AM) licensed to serve San Bernardino, California, United States, which held the call sign KUBE from 2017 to 2018
- KTDD (FM), a radio station (104.9 FM) licensed to serve Eatonville, Washington, United States, which held the call sign KUBE from 2016 to 2017
- KUBE (AM), a radio station (1350 AM) licensed to serve Pueblo, Colorado, United States
- KUBE, a former radio station (1050 AM) in Pendleton, Oregon, United States
- KUBE-TV, a television station licensed to serve Houston, Texas, United States
- Kube Radio, a student radio station at Keele University in Staffordshire, England

== People ==
- Kube (rapper), Finnish rapper
- Kube (surname)

== Other uses ==
- An abbreviation of "Kubernetes", a software tool
- Cumberland Municipal Airport (Wisconsin) (ICAO code:KUBE), an airport in Cumberland, Wisconsin, United States
- The Kurdish spelling of spelling of Kibbeh, an Arab and Levantine dish of ground meat and bulgur.

== See also ==
- Cube (disambiguation)
- Qube (disambiguation)
