= 1987 Soviet Second League =

Second League
- Season: 1987

1987 Soviet Second League was a Soviet competition in the Soviet Second League.

== Zonal tournament ==
=== Zone I (Central) ===
Pos	Team	Pld	W	D	L	GF	GA	GD	Pts
1	Iskra Smolensk	32	19	11	2	56	20	+36	49
2	Textilshchik Ivanovo	32	20	3	9	52	31	+21	43
3	Zarya Kaluga	32	18	7	7	52	35	+17	43
4	Sapfir Ryazan (Note: Spartak Ryazan changed name to Sapfir.)	32	17	9	6	37	18	+19	43
5	Krasnaya Presnya Moskva	32	16	11	5	64	27	+37	43
6	Spartak Kostroma	32	17	7	8	56	35	+21	41
7	Zorkiy Krasnogorsk	32	17	6	9	55	35	+20	40
8	Dinamo Vologda	32	12	8	12	38	30	+8	32
9	Znamya Truda Orekhovo-Zuyevo	32	12	5	15	40	36	+4	29
10	Saturn Rybinsk	32	8	13	11	26	30	−4	29
11	Torpedo Vladimir	32	6	14	12	30	36	−6	26
12	Arsenal Tula	32	8	9	15	29	40	−11	25
13	Dinamo-2 Moskva	32	10	4	18	21	49	−28	24
14	Volga Kalinin	32	8	8	16	26	52	−26	24
15	Volzhanin Kineshma	32	7	8	17	28	54	−26	22
16	CSKA-2 Moskva	32	5	8	19	23	47	−24	18
17	SK ESVSM Moskva (Note: FSM Moskva changed name to SK ESVSM.)	32	5	3	24	24	82	−58	13

=== Zone II (Volga/Ural) ===
Pos	Team	Pld	W	D	L	GF	GA	GD	Pts
1	Zvezda Perm	32	23	6	3	73	18	+55	52
2	UralMash Sverdlovsk	32	22	4	6	54	20	+34	48
3	Zenit Izhevsk	32	17	8	7	45	24	+21	42
4	Gastello Ufa	32	15	11	6	36	17	+19	41
5	Rubin Kazan	32	15	8	9	44	29	+15	38
6	Khimik Dzerzhinsk	32	12	9	11	33	33	0	33
7	Uralets Nizhniy Tagil	32	13	6	13	41	27	+14	32
8	Torpedo Togliatti	32	13	6	13	38	40	−2	32
9	Dinamo Kirov	32	12	7	13	34	31	+3	31
10	Turbina Naberezhnyye Chelny	32	11	7	14	31	41	−10	29
11	Lokomotiv Gorkiy	32	8	13	11	23	30	−7	29
12	Druzhba Yoshkar-Ola	32	10	7	15	25	48	−23	27
13	Stal Cheboksary	32	8	9	15	28	41	−13	25
14	Torpedo Kurgan	32	7	10	15	21	41	−20	24
15	Metallurg Magnitogorsk	32	10	2	20	30	55	−25	22
16	Svetotekhnika Saransk	32	6	9	17	21	47	−26	21
17	Lokomotiv Chelyabinsk	32	8	2	22	23	58	−35	18

=== Zone III (South) ===
Pos	Team	Pld	W	D	L	GF	GA	GD	Pts
1	Kuban Krasnodar	32	22	4	6	65	25	+40	48
2	Sokol Saratov	32	19	5	8	62	34	+28	43
3	Spartak Nalchik	32	18	7	7	56	34	+22	43
4	Mashuk Pyatigorsk	32	17	6	9	43	28	+15	40
5	Druzhba Maykop	32	17	6	9	42	39	+3	40
6	Terek Grozny	32	15	10	7	49	28	+21	40
7	Atommash Volgodonsk	32	15	7	10	58	37	+21	37
8	Uralan Elista	32	13	8	11	50	37	+13	34
9	Torpedo Volzhskiy	32	12	8	12	41	36	+5	32
10	Cement Novorossiysk	32	11	9	12	34	37	−3	31
11	Dinamo Makhachkala	32	12	6	14	31	34	−3	30
12	Nart Cherkessk	32	12	6	14	36	41	−5	30
13	Torpedo Taganrog	32	11	5	16	35	58	−23	27
14	Start Ulyanovsk	32	8	6	18	18	39	−21	22
15	Salyut Belgorod	32	7	4	21	23	54	−31	18
16	Lokomotiv Mineralnyye Vody	32	5	5	22	23	60	−37	15
17	Volgar Astrakhan	32	3	8	21	17	62	−45	14

=== Zone IV (Far East) ===
Pos	Team	Pld	W	D	L	GF	GA	GD	Pts
1	SKA Khabarovsk	28	21	3	4	39	14	+25	45
2	Irtysh Omsk	28	19	5	4	53	23	+30	43
3	Metallurg Novokuznetsk	28	15	5	8	42	27	+15	35
4	Dinamo Barnaul	28	13	9	6	50	24	+26	35
5	Zvezda Irkutsk	28	13	5	10	37	23	+14	31
6	Amur Blagoveshchensk	28	11	7	10	19	20	−1	29
7	Amur Komsomolsk-na-Amure	28	11	6	11	32	35	−3	28
8	Lokomotiv Chita	28	10	7	11	30	36	−6	27
9	Chkalovets Novosibirsk	28	9	8	11	27	30	−3	26
10	Manometr Tomsk	28	8	8	12	18	21	−3	24
11	Selenga Ulan-Ude	28	8	5	15	20	38	−18	21
12	Torpedo Rubtsovsk	28	7	7	14	26	42	−16	21
13	Avtomobilist Krasnoyarsk	28	7	7	14	36	45	−9	21
14	Okean Nakhodka	28	5	9	14	27	35	−8	19
15	Luch Vladivostok	28	5	5	18	15	58	−43	15

=== Zone V (Soviet Republics) ===
Pos	Rep	Team	Pld	W	D	L	GF	GA	GD	Pts
1	MDA	Nistru Kishinev	34	22	8	4	52	17	+35	52
2	LTU	Atlantas Klaipeda	34	20	6	8	52	30	+22	46
3	RUS	Baltika Kaliningrad	34	20	3	11	56	33	+23	43
4	BLR	Dinamo Brest	34	18	6	10	54	26	+28	42
5	RUS	Metallurg Lipetsk	34	17	8	9	45	30	+15	42
6	BLR	Dnepr Mogilyov	34	17	8	9	41	29	+12	42
7	RUS	Avangard Kursk	34	16	10	8	43	34	+9	42
8	MDA	Textilshchik Tiraspol	34	16	9	9	40	30	+10	41
9	EST	Sport Tallinn	34	17	6	11	42	28	+14	40
10	BLR	Khimik Grodno	34	12	6	16	33	39	−6	30
11	RUS	Dinamo Bryansk	34	11	6	17	34	44	−10	28
12	MDA	Zarya Beltsy	34	10	8	16	35	44	−9	28
13	LVA	Zvejnieks Liepaja	34	8	11	15	32	39	−7	27
14	BLR	GomSelMash Gomel	34	8	11	15	29	47	−18	27
15	RUS	Spartak Oryol	34	8	8	18	22	44	−22	24
16	RUS	Spartak Tambov	34	9	3	22	20	56	−36	21
17	BLR	Vityaz Vitebsk	34	6	8	20	28	51	−23	20
18	RUS	Dinamo Leningrad	34	7	3	24	23	60	−37	17

=== Zone VI (Ukraine) ===
Pos	Team	Pld	W	D	L	GF	GA	GD	Pts	Qualification or relegation
1	Tavriya Simferopol (C)	52	34	12	6	125	48	+77	80	Qualified for promotional playoffs
2	Nyva Ternopil	52	28	16	8	85	38	+47	72	
3	Prykarpattia Ivano-Frankivsk	52	29	10	13	69	41	+28	68	
4	Bukovyna Chernivtsi	52	27	13	12	81	46	+35	67	
5	SKA Odesa	52	25	14	13	64	45	+19	64	
6	Naftovyk Okhtyrka	52	24	15	13	72	48	+24	63	
7	Podillya Khmelnytskyi	52	23	17	12	67	49	+18	63	
8	Okean Kerch	52	26	9	17	68	50	+18	61	
9	Vorskla Poltava	52	22	14	16	74	59	+15	58	
10	Shakhtar Horlivka	52	22	13	17	67	58	+9	57	
11	Kryvbas Kryvyi Rih	52	23	10	19	68	68	0	56	
12	Spartak Zhytomyr	52	22	12	18	72	59	+13	56	
13	Nyva Vinnytsia	52	20	13	19	54	47	+7	53	
14	Avanhard Rivne	52	19	14	19	50	53	−3	52	
15	Chayka Sevastopol	52	20	9	23	57	63	−6	49	
16	Torpedo Lutsk	52	18	10	24	55	63	−8	46	
17	Sudobudivnyk Mykolaiv	52	17	10	25	52	65	−13	44	
18	Krystal Kherson	52	16	10	26	54	79	−25	42	
19	Zakarpattia Uzhhorod	52	16	10	26	59	73	−14	42	
20	Torpedo Zaporizhzhia	52	12	16	24	54	81	−27	40	
21	Shakhtar Pavlohrad	52	11	18	23	40	59	−19	40	
22	Mayak Kharkiv	52	15	9	28	47	83	−36	39	
23	Zirka Kirovohrad	52	13	13	26	44	77	−33	39	
24	Desna Chernihiv	52	11	17	24	48	80	−32	39	
25	Dynamo Irpin	52	10	19	23	37	55	−18	39	
26	Novator Zhdanov	52	16	6	30	57	107	−50	38	
27	SKA Kyiv	52	11	15	26	41	6	+35	37	Relegation to the Fitness clubs competitions (KFK)

(C) Champions

=== Zone VII (Central Asia) ===
Pos	Rep	Team	Pld	W	D	L	GF	GA	GD	Pts
1	UZB	Neftyanik Fergana	36	26	5	5	80	24	+56	57
2	UZB	Hanki Yangiaryk (Note: Horezm Yangiaryk changed name to Hanki.)	36	19	8	9	49	26	+23	46
3	KGZ	Alga Frunze	36	19	7	10	48	27	+21	45
4	UZB	Dinamo Samarkand	36	18	8	10	56	43	+13	44
5	UZB	Kasansayets Kasansay	36	17	10	9	53	39	+14	44
6	UZB	Tselinnik Turtkul	36	19	4	13	44	43	+1	42
7	UZB	Traktor Tashkent	36	19	3	14	57	49	+8	41
8	UZB	Avtomobilist Namangan	36	18	4	14	41	36	+5	40
9	TJK	Hojent Leninabad	36	19	1	16	71	62	+9	39
10	TJK	Vakhsh Kurgan-Tyube	36	16	5	15	49	40	+9	37
11	UZB	Sohibkor Halkabad	36	14	6	16	50	50	0	34
12	UZB	Yeshlik Jizak	36	12	8	16	45	55	−10	32
13	UZB	Surhan Termez	36	11	6	19	40	66	−26	28
14	UZB	Yangiyer	36	9	10	17	43	55	−12	28
15	UZB	Zarafshan Navoi	36	9	10	17	28	43	−15	28
16	UZB	Pahtakor Andizhan	36	9	9	18	31	59	−28	27
17	KGZ	Alay Osh	36	11	4	21	33	56	−23	26
18	UZB	Metallurg Almalyk	36	10	5	21	35	62	−27	25
19	UZB	Shakhtyor Angren	36	6	9	21	33	51	−18	21

=== Zone VIII (Kazakhstan) ===
Pos	Team	Pld	W	D	L	GF	GA	GD	Pts
1	Meliorator Chimkent	28	21	2	5	70	23	+47	44
2	Traktor Pavlodar	28	13	12	3	33	21	+12	38
3	Khimik Jambul	28	14	7	7	50	29	+21	35
4	Meliorator Kzil-Orda	28	14	5	9	56	25	+31	33
5	Tselinnik Tselinograd	28	13	7	8	35	25	+10	33
6	Spartak Semipalatinsk	28	14	4	10	55	35	+20	32
7	Aktyubinets Aktyubinsk	28	14	4	10	35	27	+8	32
8	Ekibastuzets Ekibastuz	28	13	5	10	54	41	+13	31
9	Shakhtyor Karaganda	28	11	9	8	42	32	+10	31
10	Energetik Kustanay	28	14	2	12	45	47	−2	30
11	Vostok Ust-Kamenogorsk	28	11	5	12	34	49	−15	27
12	Zhetysu Taldy-Kurgan	28	8	3	17	29	47	−18	19
13	Jezkazganets Jezkazgan	28	5	4	19	22	59	−37	14
14	Torpedo Kokchetav	28	5	2	21	26	70	−44	12
15	SKIF Alma-Ata	28	3	3	22	17	80	−63	9

=== Zone IX (Caucasus) ===
Pos	Rep	Team	Pld	W	D	L	GF	GA	GD	Pts
1	GEO	Lokomotiv Samtredia	30	19	4	7	46	26	+20	42
2	GEO	Dinamo Sukhumi	30	16	7	7	53	31	+22	39
3	GEO	Kolkheti Poti	30	14	5	11	45	35	+10	33
4	GEO	Shevardeni Tbilisi	30	14	4	12	51	38	+13	32
5	AZE	Voskhod Sumgait	30	14	3	13	41	38	+3	31
6	ARM	Spartak Oktemberyan	30	14	3	13	42	43	−1	31
7	AZE	Kyapaz Kirovabad	30	13	5	12	55	50	+5	31
8	ARM	Olimpia Leninakan (Note: Shirak Leninakan changed name to Olimpia.)	30	13	4	13	44	42	+2	30
9	GEO	Metallurg Rustavi	30	13	3	14	36	36	0	29
10	GEO	Dila Gori	30	12	5	13	40	42	−2	29
11	GEO	Meshakhte Tkibuli	30	11	7	12	38	44	−6	29
12	ARM	Lori Kirovakan	30	12	4	14	31	34	−3	28
13	AZE	Karabakh Stepanakert	30	12	3	15	34	47	−13	27
14	AZE	Goyazan Kazakh	30	11	3	16	30	47	−17	25
15	TKM	Kolhozchi Ashkhabad	30	8	7	15	28	42	−14	23
16	AZE	Avtomobilist Mingechaur	30	8	5	17	37	56	−19	21

== Zone finals ==
=== Group 1 ===
Pos	Rep	Team	Pld	W	D	L	GF	GA	GD	Pts	Promotion
1	UKR	Tavria Simferopol	4	2	1	1	15	7	+8	5	Promoted
2	RUS	Iskra Smolensk	4	2	1	1	7	8	−1	5	
3	GEO	Lokomotiv Samtredia	4	1	0	3	5	12	−7	2	

=== Group 2 ===
Pos	Rep	Team	Pld	W	D	L	GF	GA	GD	Pts	Promotion
1	RUS	Zvezda Perm	4	3	1	0	6	2	+4	7	Promoted
2	KAZ	Meliorator Chimkent	4	1	1	2	4	5	−1	3	
3	RUS	SKA Khabarovsk	4	0	2	2	1	4	−3	2	

=== Group 3 ===
Pos	Rep	Team	Pld	W	D	L	GF	GA	GD	Pts	Promotion
1	RUS	Kuban Krasnodar	4	2	1	1	7	3	+4	5	Promoted
2	MDA	Nistru Kishinev	4	2	0	2	5	3	+2	4	
3	UZB	Neftyanik Fergana	4	1	1	2	2	8	−6	3	

Source: rsssf.com
