= Salvatore Marchesi =

Italian painter (1852–1926)

Salvatore Marchesi (1852–1926) was an Italian painter, mainly painting interior scenes of churches.

== Biography ==
He initially studied in his native Parma, graduating in 1871 with a diploma in the teaching of design. Later at Rome he was an assistant teacher in the Courses of Descriptive Geometry at the University, where he then began to practice his art. In 1873, he exhibited at the Brera Academy, his painting depicting the Choir of the church of San Giovanni of Parma was awarded the Prince Umberto prize. He also won an award at the 1876 International Centennial Exhibition in Philadelphia.

In 1876, he was also nominated to be honorary associate of the Academy of Fine Arts of Parma. He displayed in 1877 at Naples; some of the paintings were chosen by the Ministry for the 1878 International Exposition of Paris, and obtained for him the title of Honorary Associate of the Società Cooperativa of Roman Artists. He exhibited at the Mostra Nazionale of Turin in 1884 a canvas titled Prime note acquired by the Museo Civico Revoltella of Trieste. From 1881 to 1885 he was professor of the School of Art in Brescia; in 1885, he was named director. In 1886, he won by contest the appointment as a professor of Perspective in the Royal Institute of Fine Arts of Palermo; that year, he published an instruction guide to perspective drawing, titled: Principii fondamentali di prospettiva lineare esposti con nuovi metodi per facilitare all' artista la ricerca del vero. At the Mostra Artistica di Palermo, he exhibited I bibliofili; In coro; and La Zisa.
