= List of Soviet football teams of masters =

The Soviet football championship was composed of professional teams that were known as "teams of masters".

The first professional football competitions in the Soviet Union started in 1936. The format of Soviet football championship was not consisted and was changing almost every year.

Officially professional sports in the Soviet Union was prohibited as any other private form of business. As anything else in the country, football also was controlled by Soviet government and the Communist Party of the Soviet Union. The best "teams of masters" were Dynamo controlled by Soviet secret police, Army and Armed Forces clubs, and Spartak which officially represented "industrial cooperation" but was actually directed by the young communists of Komsomol. Following the so-called "liberation of Europe by the Red Army" in 1944–45, numerous Dynamos, CSKA, and Spartaks were set up in countries of the Warsaw Pact. These teams were also instantaneously created with occupation of eastern Poland, Baltics and eastern Romania in 1939–1940.

Officially all footballers were employed because unemployment was illegal. So, footballers were playing football, while on the books working and getting paid as a regular worker. Unlike professional athletes in the West who were becoming rich celebrities, in the Soviet Union notable sports athletes were transitioning to their new career as an "apparatchik", or Communist official, whether in coaching or administrative positions.

== Teams of masters ==
Club	Union republic	First League season	Last League season	Status
Spartak Moscow	Russia	1936	1991	Joined Russian competitions
Dynamo Moscow	Russia	1936	1991	Joined Russian competitions
Dynamo Kyiv	Ukraine	1936	1991	Joined Ukrainian competitions
Dinamo Tbilisi	Georgia	1936	1989	Joined Georgian competitions
Torpedo Moscow	Russia	1936	1991	Joined Russian competitions
CSKA Moscow	Russia	1936	1991	Joined Russian competitions
Zenit Leningrad	Russia	1936	1991	Joined Russian competitions
Shakhtar Donetsk	Ukraine	1936	1991	Joined Ukrainian competitions
Dinamo Minsk	Belarus	1940	1991	Joined Belarusian competitions
Ararat Yerevan	Armenia	1937	1991	Joined Armenian competitions
Lokomotiv Moscow	Russia	1936	1991	Joined Russian competitions
Neftchi Baku	Azerbaijan	1937	1991	Joined Azerbaijani competitions
Chornomorets Odesa	Ukraine	1936	1991	Joined Ukrainian competitions
Kairat Alma-Ata	Kazakhstan	1947	1991	Joined Kazakhstani competitions
SKA Rostov-na-Donu	Russia	1958	1991	Joined Russian competitions
Pakhtakor Tashkent	Uzbekistan	1947	1991	Joined Uzbekistani competitions
Dnipro Dnipropetrovsk	Ukraine	1937	1991	Joined Ukrainian competitions
Krylya Sovetov Kuybyshev	Russia	1945	1991	Joined Russian competitions
Dinamo Leningrad	Russia	1936	1991	Joined Russian competitions
Metalist Kharkiv	Ukraine	1936	1991	Joined Ukrainian competitions
Zorya Luhansk	Ukraine	1939	1991	Joined Ukrainian competitions
Metalurh Odesa	Ukraine	1953	1954	Joined Ukrainian competitions
Trudovi Rezervy Voroshilovgrad	Ukraine	1949	1963	Joined Ukrainian competitions
Torpedo Kutaisi	Georgia	1949	1989	Joined Georgian competitions
Zalgiris Vilnius	Lithuania	1947	1991	Joined Lithuanian competitions
Rotor Volgograd	Russia	1936	1991	Joined Russian competitions
Nistru Kishinev	Moldova	1947	1991	Joined Moldovan competitions
Karpaty Lviv	Ukraine	1963	1991	Joined Ukrainian competitions
VVS Moscow	Russia	1945	1952	Dissolved
Daugava Riga	Latvia	1948	1990	Dissolved
Serp i Molot Moscow	Russia	1936	1969	Dissolved
Krylia Sovetov Moscow	Russia	1936	1969	Dissolved
Lokomotyv Kharkiv	Ukraine	1945	1955	Dissolved
Kuban Krasnodar	Russia	1949	1991	Joined Russian competitions
Admiralteyets Leningrad	Russia	1939	1961	Dissolved
Pamir Dushanbe	Tajikistan	1947	1991	Joined Tajikistani competitions
Elektrosila Leningrad	Russia	1936	1946	Dissolved
Fakel Voronezh	Russia	1954	1991	Joined Russian competitions
Spartak Tbilisi	Georgia	1947	1977	Dissolved
Trudovye Rezervy Leningrad	Russia	1954	1959	Dissolved
Spartak Vladikavkaz	Russia	1960	1991	Joined Russian competitions
Metalurh Zaporizhzhia	Ukraine	1947	1991	Joined Ukrainian competitions
Torpedo Gorky	Russia	1936	1962	Dissolved
Volga Gorky	Russia	1963	1984	Dissolved
Avtomobilist Leningrad	Russia	1936	1966	Dissolved
Tavria Simferopol	Ukraine	1958	1991	Joined Ukrainian competitions
SKA Odesa	Ukraine	1958	1991	Replaced with SC Odesa
Silmash Kharkiv	Ukraine	1937	1940	Dissolved
VMS Moscow	Russia	1946	1953	Dissolved
Stalinets Moscow	Russia	1936	1939	Dissolved
Lokomotyv Kyiv	Ukraine	1936	1940	Dissolved
Uralmash Sverdlovsk	Russia	1945	1991	Joined Russian competitions
Spartak Kharkiv	Ukraine	1936	1941	Dissolved
Kalev Tallinn	Estonia	1947	1962	Dissolved
Dynamo Rostov-na-Donu	Russia	1936	1949	Dissolved
Shinnik Yaroslavl	Russia	1947	1991	Joined Russian competitions
Temp Baku	Azerbaijan	1936	1939	Dissolved
Kapaz Ganja	Azerbaijan	1959	1991	Joined Azerbaijani competitions
Lokomotivi Tbilisi	Georgia	1936	1986	Joined Georgian competitions
Guria Lanchkhuti	Georgia	1967	1989	Joined Georgian competitions
ODO Sverdlovsk	Russia	1946	1959	Dissolved
Pischevik Moscow	Russia	1938	1947	Dissolved
Kalinin	Russia	1945	1953	Dissolved
Burevestnik Moscow	Russia	1937	1947	Dissolved
Profsoyuzy-1 Moscow	Russia	1941	1941	Dissolved
Profsoyuzy-2 Moscow	Russia	1941	1941	Dissolved
Kuzbass Kemerevo	Russia	1948	1991	Joined Russian competitions
Tekstilschik Ivanovo	Russia	1939	1991	Joined Russian competitions
SKA Lviv	Ukraine	1949	1991	Turned into FC Halychyna Drohobych
Zvezda Perm	Russia	1945	1991	Joined Russian competitions
Kopetdag Ashgabat	Turkmenistan	1947	1991	Joined Turkmenistani competitions
Rostselmash Rostov-na-Donu	Russia	1953	1991	Joined Russian competitions
SKA Khabarovsk	Russia	1957	1991	Joined Russian competitions
Alga Frunze	Kyrgyzstan	1947	1991	Joined Kyrgyzstani competitions
Dynamo Stavropol	Russia	1957	1991	Joined Russian competitions
SKA Kyiv	Ukraine	1947	1991	Turned into CSKA Kyiv
Shakhter Karaganda	Kazakhstan	1958	1991	Joined Kazakhstani competitions
Terek Grozny	Russia	1957	1991	Joined Russian competitions
Prykarpattia Ivano-Frankivsk	Ukraine	1956	1991	Joined Ukrainian competitions
Sudnobudivnyk Mykolaiv	Ukraine	1939	1991	Turned into Evis Mykolaiv
Rubin Kazan	Russia	1958	1991	Joined Russian competitions
Dinamo Batumi	Georgia	1939	1989	Joined Georgian competitions
Volga Kalinin	Russia	1949	1991	Joined Russian competitions
Sokol Saratov	Russia	1947	1991	Joined Russian competitions
Lokomotiv Chelyabinsk	Russia	1957	1987	Joined Russian competitions
Kolos Nikopol	Ukraine	1962	1991	Joined Ukrainian competitions
Spartak Nalchik	Russia	1959	1991	Joined Russian competitions
SKA Tbilisi	Georgia	1946	1959	Joined Georgian competitions
SKA Novosibirsk	Russia	1945	1968	Joined Russian competitions
Irtysh Omsk	Russia	1947	1991	Joined Russian competitions
Nyva Vinnytsia	Ukraine	1958	1991	Joined Ukrainian competitions
Avtomobilist Leningrad	Russia	1936	1966	Dissolved
Zakarpattia Uzhhorod	Ukraine	1947	1991	Joined Ukrainian competitions
Torpedo Taganrog	Russia	1948	1991	Joined Russian competitions
