= Chukna =

Rural locality in Russia

Chukna Чукна Чукӏун
- Selo
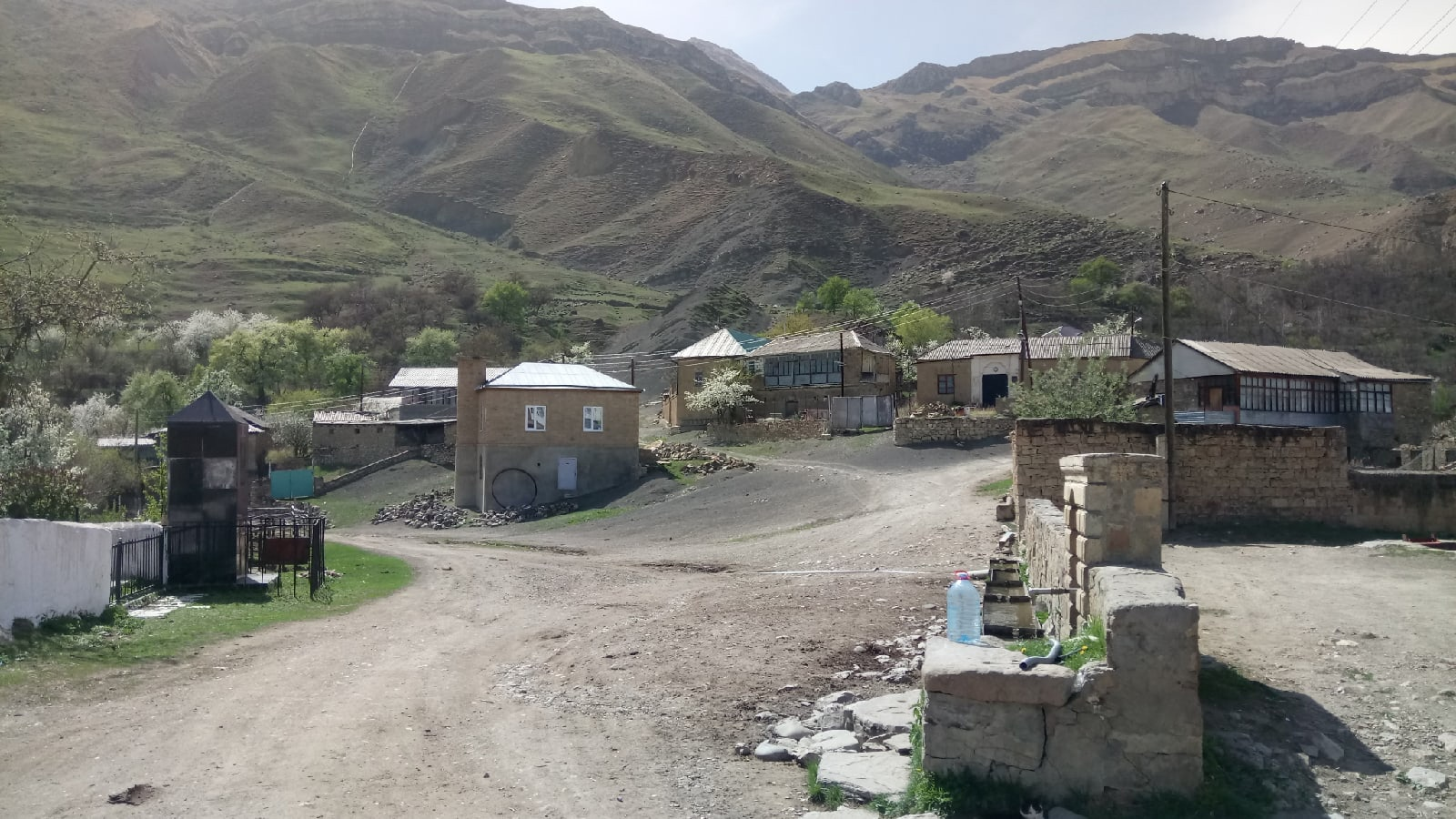

- Location within Republic of Dagestan Location within Russia
- Coordinates: 42°18′N 47°07′E
- Country: Russia
- Region: Republic of Dagestan
- District: Laksky District
- Time zone: UTC+3:00

Chukna (Russian: Чукна; Lak: Чукӏун) is a rural locality (or selo) in Kurklinsky Selsoviet, Laksky District, Republic of Dagestan, Russia.

In 2010, the population was 156.

== Geography ==
Chukna is located 20 km (12 mi) north of the district's administrative center Kumukh by road. Kurkli and Kuma are the nearest rural localities.

== Notable people ==
- Dzhamalutdin Muslimov (People's Artist of the DASSR, People's Choreographer)
