= Qube =

Qube or Qubes may refer to:

== Science and technology ==
- Qube (cable television), a former cable television system
- Qubes OS, a security-focused desktop operating system
- Cobalt Qube, a server appliance produced by Cobalt
- QUBE, a virtual learning software program by OpenQwaq
- QuBE (Quantum Effects in Biological Environments), a DARPA project

== Video games ==
- Intelligent Qube, a 1997 puzzle video game
- Q.U.B.E., a 2011 puzzle video game
- Q*bert's Qubes, an arcade video game published in 1982

== Buildings ==
- The Qube, an office building in Detroit, Michigan, United States
- Westcoast Building, now known as The Qube, a building in Vancouver, BC, Canada

== Companies ==
- Qube Cinema, a company that makes digital cinema servers
- Qube Holdings, an Australian transport company
- Qube Research & Technologies, London-based quantitative investment management firm
- Qube Software, London-based makers of 3D software Q (game engine)

== Other ==
- The Qube, a component of the game show Qubit

== See also ==
- Cube (disambiguation)
- Kube (disambiguation)
- PocketQube
