= Cubic =

Cubic may refer to:

== Science and mathematics ==
- Cube (algebra), "cubic" measurement
- Cube, a three-dimensional solid object bounded by six square faces, facets or sides, with three meeting at each vertex
  - Cubic crystal system, a crystal system where the unit cell is in the shape of a cube
- Cubic function, a polynomial function of degree three
- Cubic equation, a polynomial equation (reducible to ax^{3} + bx^{2} + cx + d = 0)
- Cubic form, a homogeneous polynomial of degree 3
- Cubic graph (mathematics - graph theory), a graph where all vertices have degree 3
- Cubic plane curve (mathematics), a plane algebraic curve C defined by a cubic equation
- Cubic reciprocity (mathematics - number theory), a theorem analogous to quadratic reciprocity
- Cubic surface, an algebraic surface in three-dimensional space
- Cubic zirconia, in geology, a mineral that is widely synthesized for use as a diamond simulacra
- CUBIC, a histology method

== Computing ==
- Cubic IDE, a modular development environment
- CUBIC TCP, a TCP congestion-avoidance strategy
- Cubic, a GUI wizard to create a customized Live ISO image for Ubuntu and Debian based distributions

== Media ==
- Cubic (film), a 2002 science-fiction film also known as Equilibrium
- Cubic (TV series), a 2014 Thai soap opera

== Other ==
- Cubic Corporation, an American company that provides transportation and defense systems
  - Cubic Transportation Systems, a division of Cubic Corporation
- Cubic (river), a tributary of the Ier in northwestern Romania

== See also ==
- Cube (disambiguation)
- Cubicle, a small area set off by walls for special use, such as a place to work, to shower, or with a toilet
- Quadratic, relating to degree 2, as next lower below cubic
- Quartic, relating to degree 4, as next higher above cubic
