= Kuba =

Kuba or Quba may refer to:

== Places ==
- Quba, capital of Quba Rayon, Azerbaijan
- Quba District (Azerbaijan)
- Kuba Kingdom, a historical Central African state
- Küba, a village in the Tibet Autonomous Region of China
- Kuba, Republic of Dagestan, a rural locality in Dagestan, Russia
- Kuba, Tibet

== People ==
- Kuba (surname)
- Jakub Błaszczykowski, Polish footballer, nicknamed "Kuba"
- Kuba Szmajkowski, Polish musical artist

== Other uses ==
- Kibbeh, or kuba, a ground-meat dish in West Asian cuisine
- Kong-kài, or Kuba, a temple or shrine in Siraya, Taivoan, Makatao, and related cultures
- Qubba or qubbat, domes in Islamic architecture
- Quba Mosque, a historical mosque in Medina, Saudi Arabia
- Quba rugs and carpets

== See also ==
- Cuba (disambiguation)
- Guba (disambiguation)
- Kuban (disambiguation)
- Gonbad (disambiguation)
