= Guba =

Guba may refer to:

- Guba (surname)
- Quba, Azerbaijan, a city also spelled as Guba and Kuba
- Guba River, a river near Indwe, Eastern Cape, South Africa
- Guba (woreda), a woreda in Ethiopia
- Abba Guba, one of the Nine Saints of Ethiopia
- Cyclone Guba, a 2007 tropical cyclone in Australasia
- Gubguba, also known as guba, an Indian percussion string instrument
- a Hungarian prehistoric coat made of coarse knotted cloth
- a mourning chant sung by guests at an ancient Irish Aonach
- Ghana UK-Based Achievement Awards (GUBA Awards), an annual British award that recognises the contributions of British-Ghanaians to society

== See also ==
- Kuba (disambiguation)
- Guba Koricha, a woreda in Ethiopia
- Guba Lafto, a woreda in Ethiopia
