= Kuban (disambiguation) =

Kuban is a geographic region in Southern Russia.

Kuban may also refer to:

== Places ==
=== Russia ===
- Kuban (river), a river in Russia
- Kuban steppe, a geographic region
- Kuban Oblast (1860–1917), an oblast of the Russian Empire
- Kuban People's Republic (January 1918–November 1919), anti-Bolshevik state
- Kuban Soviet Republic (April 13 – May 30, 1918), an administrative division of the Soviet Russian Republic
- Kuban-Black Sea Soviet Republic (May 30 – July 6, 1918), an administrative division of the Soviet Russian Republic
- Kuban-Black Sea Oblast (1920–1924), an oblast of the early Russian Soviet Federative Socialist Republic (RSFSR)

=== Other ===
- Kuban, Iran, a village in Gilan Province, Iran

== Sports ==
- FC Kuban Krasnodar, an association football club based in Krasnodar, Russia
- HC Kuban Krasnodar, a women's handball team based in Krasnodar
- HC Kuban, an ice hockey team based in Krasnodar
- RC Kuban, a rugby union team based in Krasnodar
- Kuban Stadium, a multi-purpose stadium in Krasnodar

== Other uses ==
- SS Augusta Victoria (1888), a German passenger ship which served as the auxiliary cruiser Kuban in the Imperial Russian Navy from 1904 to 1907
- Kuban (surname)
- Kuban Airlines, based in Krasnodar, active from 1992 to 2012

== See also ==
- Cuban (disambiguation)
- Kuba (disambiguation)
