= Cuba, Lafayette County, Missouri =

Ghost town in Missouri, U.S.

Coordinates: 39.2172396°N 93.6113256°W

Cuba is a ghost town in Lafayette County, in the U.S. state of Missouri.

Cuba was founded by a colony of African Americans, whose skin color was likened to that of Cubans, hence the name.
