= La Cuba, Cuba =

La Cuba
- Ward & Division
- La Cuba (red) in Palma Soriano (orange) in Santiago de Cuba (yellow)

- Location within Cuba
- Coordinates: 20°13′28″N 75°59′55″W
- Country: Cuba
- Province: Santiago de Cuba
- Municipality: Palma Soriano
- Postal Code: 92630

La Cuba is a ward (consejo popular) and a division (reparto) in the municipality of Palma Soriano, Santiago de Cuba Province, Cuba.
