= Guba (surname) =

Guba (Cyrillic: Губа) is a gender-neutral Slavic surname. Notable people with the surname include:

- Danny Guba (born 1952), Filipino martial artist
- Dávid Guba (born 1991), Slovak football player
- Paulina Guba (born 1991), Polish shot putter

== See also ==
- Huba (surname)
