= Iceland, California =

Iceland Cuba
- Former settlement
- Location in California
- Coordinates: 39°22′32″N 120°01′30″W
- Country: United States
- State: California
- County: Nevada County
- Elevation: 5,407 ft (1,648 m)
- Time zone: UTC-8 (Pacific (PST))
  - Summer (DST): UTC-7 (PDT)

Iceland, once known as Cuba, was an ice farming and lumbering community in eastern Nevada County, California. It was located between Boca, California and the Nevada state line, about 1 1/2 miles south of Floriston, California and 9 miles east of Truckee, California. It lay near where Gray Creek flows into the Truckee River.

Iceland originated in 1867 as the Central Pacific Railroad's construction Camp 20. It was soon called Cuba, the name which persisted until 1897 when the new post office was named Iceland.

After the Transcontinental Railroad came through eastern Nevada County, entrepreneurs built a number of ice ponds, usually by damming or diverting the Truckee River or one of its tributaries, around railroad stops such as Camp 20 and Boca. Ice harvesting began at Boca in 1868. A little later, Joseph Gray, one of Truckee's founders, built a lumber mill in Cuba. The creek is named after him. Gray dammed the creek and created an ice pond. In 1876, he leased his property to the People’s Ice Company. The Mountain Ice Company was also operating in Cuba. It encountered financial problems and was sold in 1882 at a constable's sale to satisfy a judgment against it. It reemerged under the leadership of Rod McLellan, who in 1885 built a new icehouse 18' high and 50' by 200'. Other ice harvesters in the area were the Union Ice Company, the National Ice Company, and the Floriston Ice Company.

Winter ice at Iceland regularly exceeded 12 inches of thickness and the harvest often produced 15-25,000 tons of ice. The ice, insulated with sawdust, was shipped by rail around the country for use in iceboxes and was packed around fruit being shipped to eastern markets.

The 1880 census listed 25 residents. During the winter ice harvesting season, the population would have swelled to well over 100. The town does not appear to have had a school, store or saloon. There were a number of ice warehouses and related structures. In addition to the rail connection, it was connected by road to Truckee, Boca and Floriston. The Sunset Telephone And Telegraph Company connected Iceland with Truckee.

In 1897, Mary Dysart applied to open a post office to be called Iceland. Mary was the wife of David M. Dysart, Superintendent of the National Ice Company's Iceland facility. She mapped Iceland as just southeast of where Gray Creek enters the Truckee River. The post office was to be located about 150 feet from the Cuba railroad station, on the south side of the track. She reported the town's population as 75.

In Beginning with Gray's mill, lumbering was the other major industry around Iceland. The Sierra Nevada Wood & Lumber Co. and the Iceland Wood and Lumber company were active in the area.

By 1923, with the advent of ice-making machines and refrigerated rail cars, the ice industry came to a sudden end. The post office closed that year. Little of the ice harvesting industry remains visible, except for the remains of the dam across Gray Creek and some remains of ice pond walls.
