= Kube (surname) =

Kube is a German surname. Notable people with the surname include:

- Courtney Kube (born 1978), American television journalist
- Eberhard Kube (1936-2022), German mime artist
- Ernst Kube (fl. late 1930s), German sprint canoeist
- Horst Kube (1920–1976) , German actor
- Michael P. Kube-McDowell (born 1954), American novelist
- Wilhelm Kube (1887–1943), German politician and Nazi official
