= Zisa, Palermo =

Castle in Palermo, Sicily, Italy

Zisa
UNESCO World Heritage Site
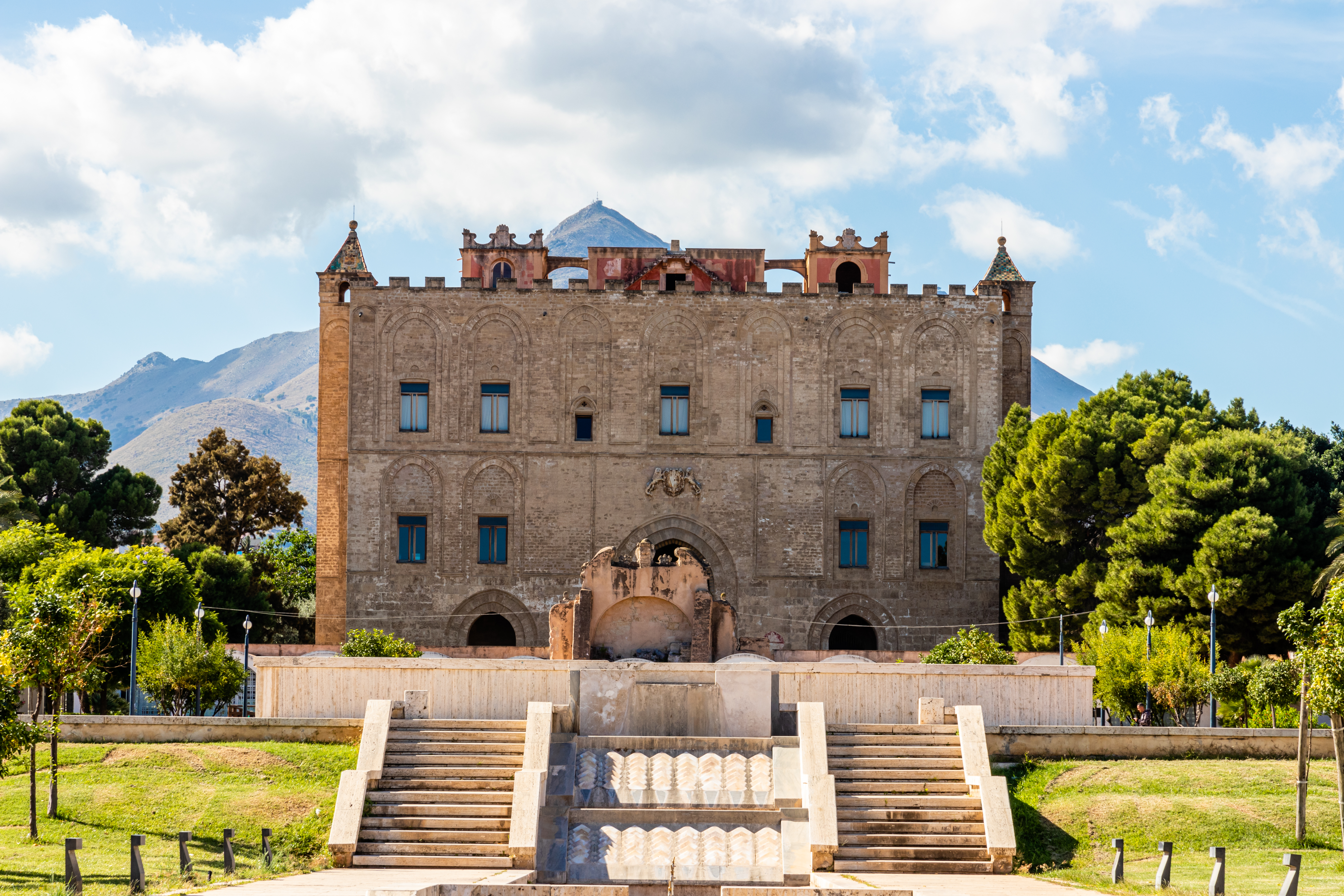

- Location within Sicily Location within Italy
- Location: Palermo, Sicily, Italy
- Part of: Arab-Norman Palermo and the Cathedral Churches of Cefalù and Monreale
- Reference: 1487-006
- Inscription: 2015 (39th Session)
- Area: 0.8 ha (2.0 acres)
- Coordinates: 38°07′00″N 13°20′29″E

The Zisa (Italian: [ˈdziːza], Sicilian: [ˈtsiːsa]) is a grand 12th-century Norman hunting lodge and summer palace in the western area of Palermo, in the region of Sicily, Italy. The edifice was started around 1165 by Arab craftsmen under the rule of the Norman conqueror of Sicily, king William I. It was not finished until 1189, under the rule of William II. It is presently open to the public for tours.

The name Zisa derives from the Arabic term al-ʿAzīza (العزيزة), meaning 'the Dear one' or 'the Splendid one'. The same word, in Naskh script, is impressed in the entrance, according to the usual habit for the main Islamic edifices of the time. The structure was conceived as a summer residence for the Norman kings, as a part of the large hunting resort known as Genoardo (Arabic: جنة الأرض, romanized: Jannat al-Arḍ, lit. 'Earthly Paradise') that included also the Cuba Sottana, the Cuba Soprana and the Uscibene palace, and extensive gardens, of which no traces remain. Joan of England, widow of William II, was once confined to the palace by the new king Tancred of Sicily due to her backing Princess Constance aunt of William II to ascend the throne.

At the end of the 15th century the building fell into disrepair while in private hands. In 1635, a new owner, Giovanni de Sandoval, cousin to the Viceroy of Sicily, acquired the palace for free due to its poor state. The palace remained in the hands of the Sandoval family until 1808, when it eventually fell again to ruin. From 1808 to the 1950s the building was used a residence by the princes Notarbartolo di Sciara. In the 1990s, the building was picked up for restoration by the Region of Sicily. In July 2015 it was included in the UNESCO Arab-Norman Palermo and the Cathedral Churches of Cefalù and Monreale World Heritage Site.

== Architectural style ==
The structure includes Islamic elements such as muqarnas, and vaulted niches. In the 14th century merlons were added, by partly destroying the Arab inscription (in Kufic characters) which embellished the upper part of the building. More substantial modifications were introduced in the 17th century, when the Zisa, reduced to very poor conditions, was purchased by Giovanni di Sandoval e Platamone, Marquis of S. Giovanni la Mendola, Prince of Castelreale, Lord of the Mezzagrana and the Zisa. The latter's marble coat of arms with two lions can be seen over the entrance fornix. Several rooms of the interior were modified and others added on the ceiling, a great stair was built, as well as new external windows.

== Use ==
As the Zisa was originally built as a semi-rural summer palace, many of its design features reflect this function. A pool at the front of the building flowed through open channels into the interior to the main hall. The architect chose to use thicker material for building and smaller windows to keep a stable internal temperature. The castle had a fully functional air conditioning system that allowed airflow throughout the whole of the building that was heavily inspired by Egyptian and Mesopotamian architectural styles and the architect also made the conscious choice to build the building facing towards the ocean.

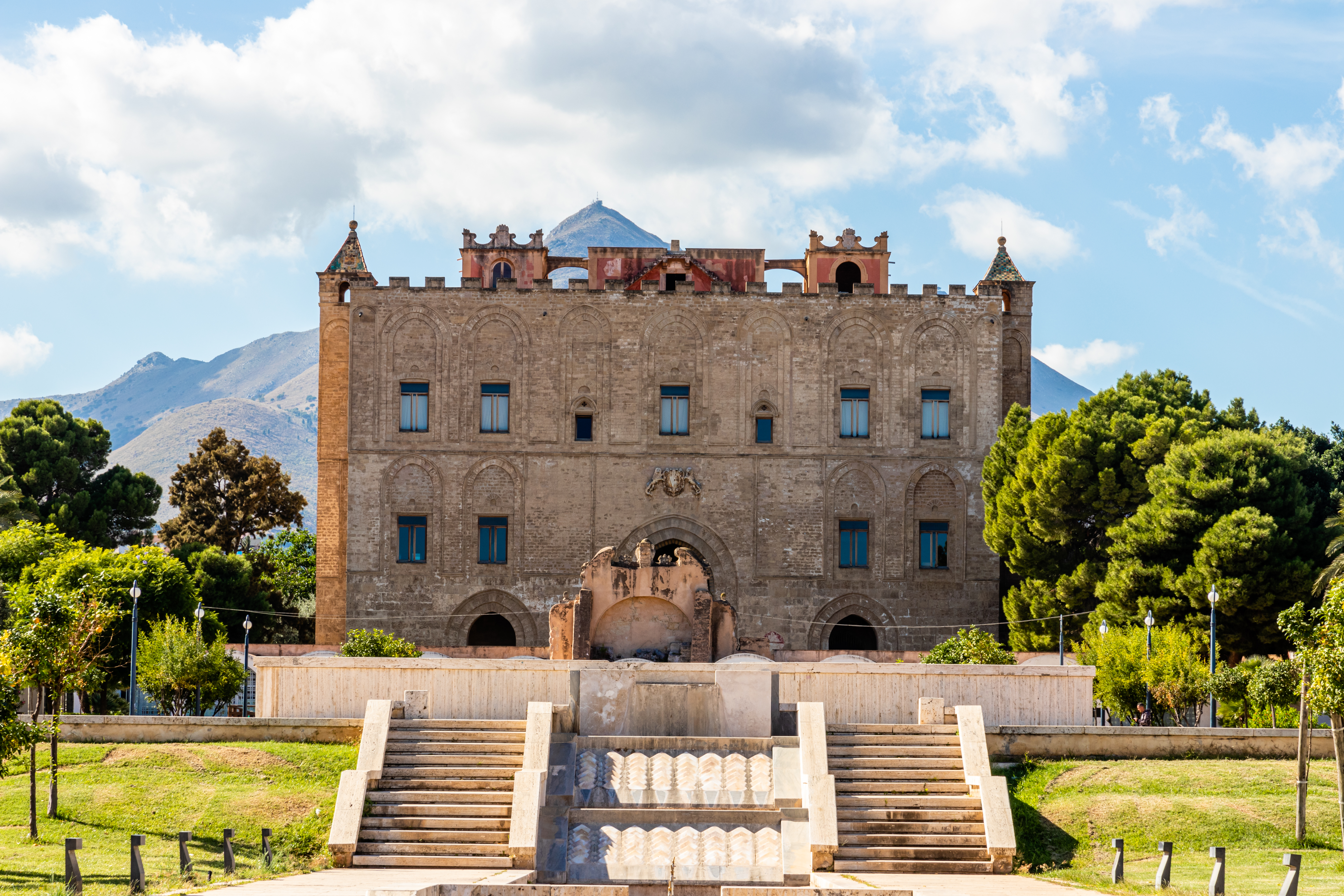
Usage of thick building material and small windows for temperature control

== Gallery ==
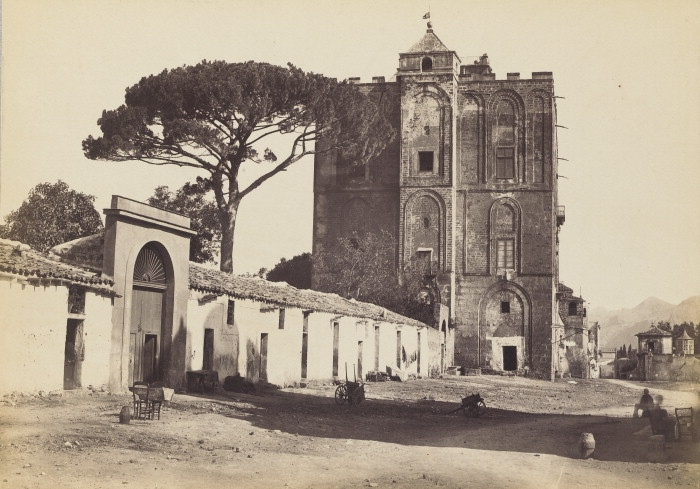
Zisa c. 1880, ph. Giorgio Sommer

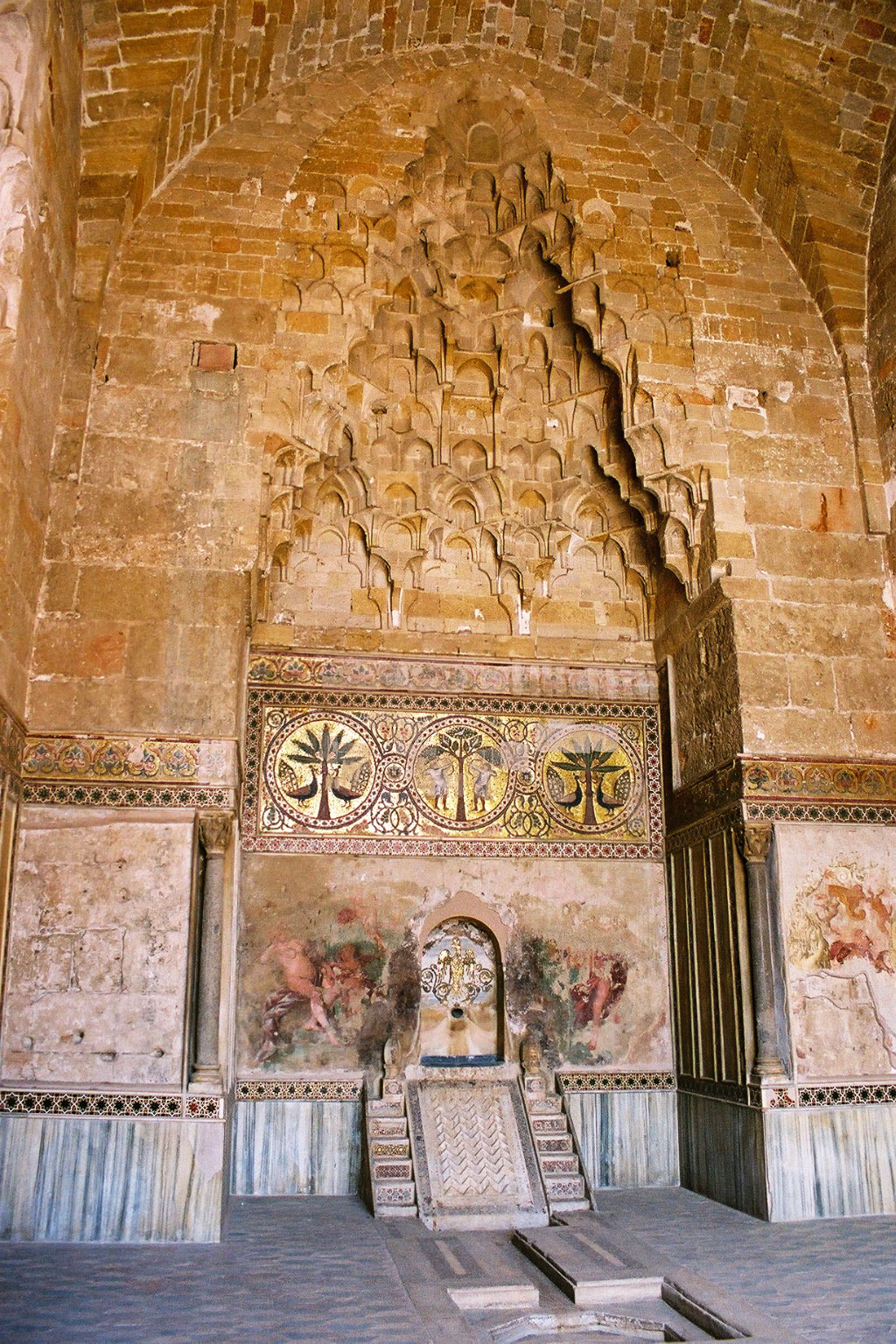
Niche with fountain in the main hall

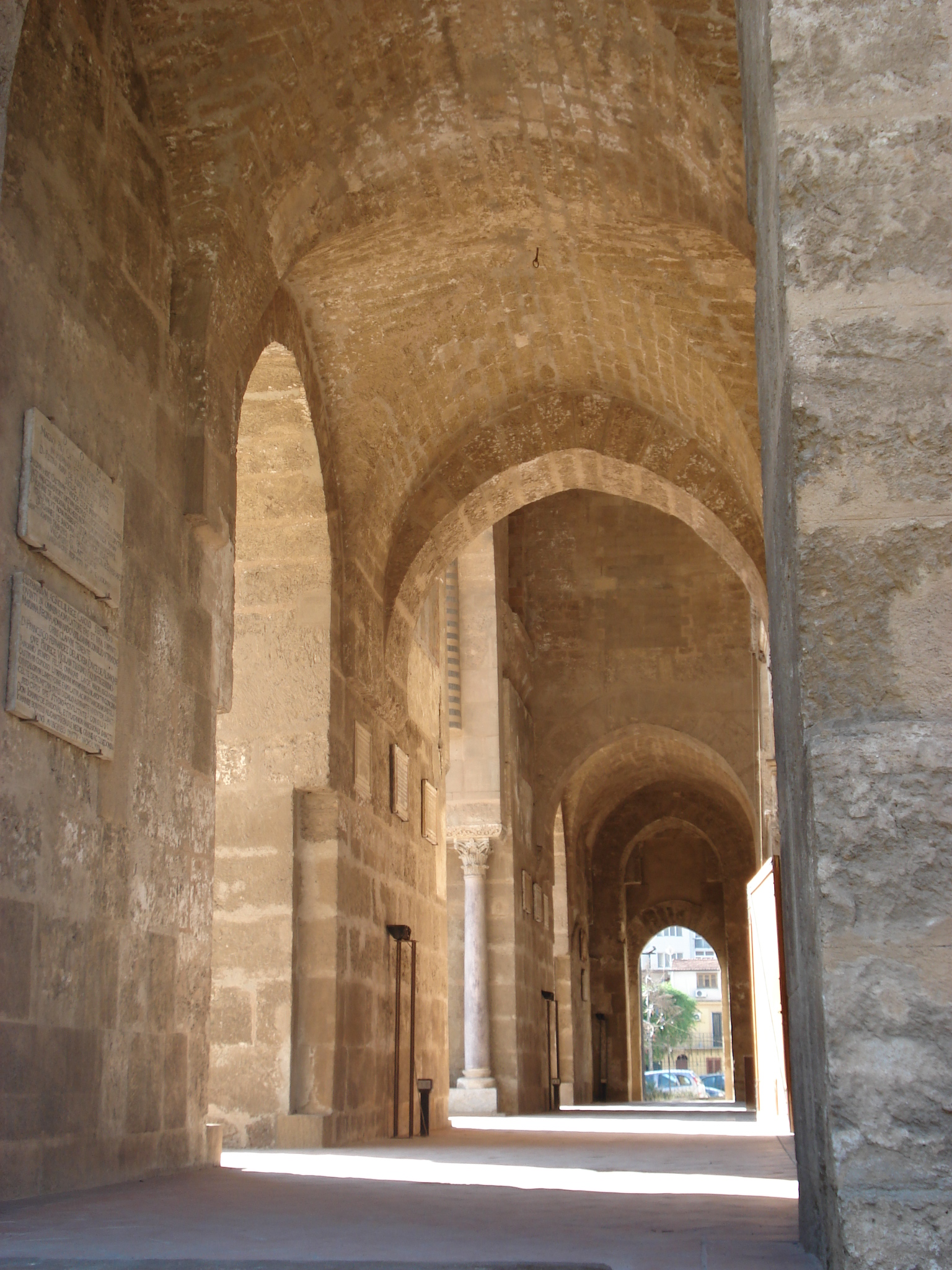
Vestibule

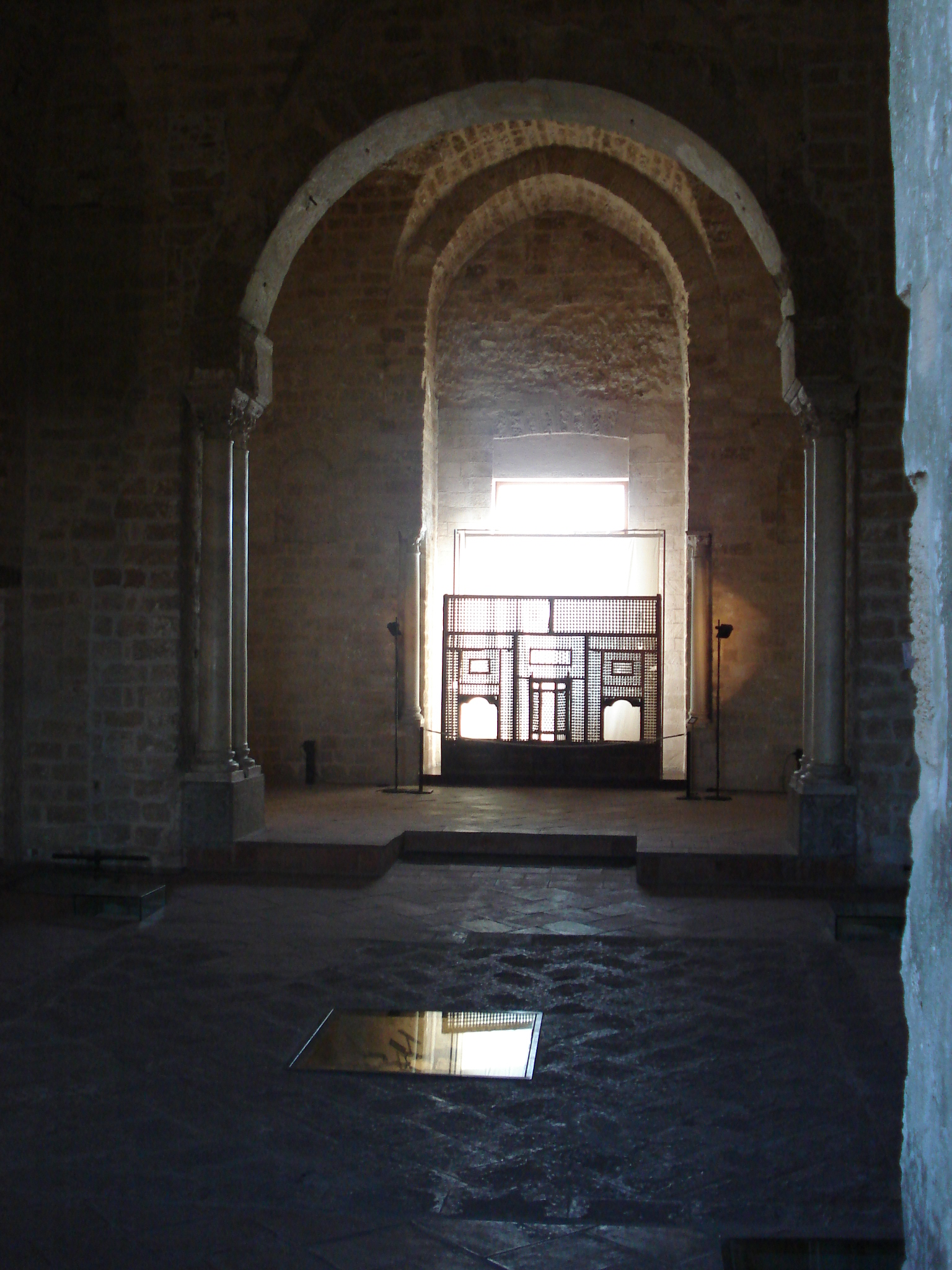
The hall on the second floor

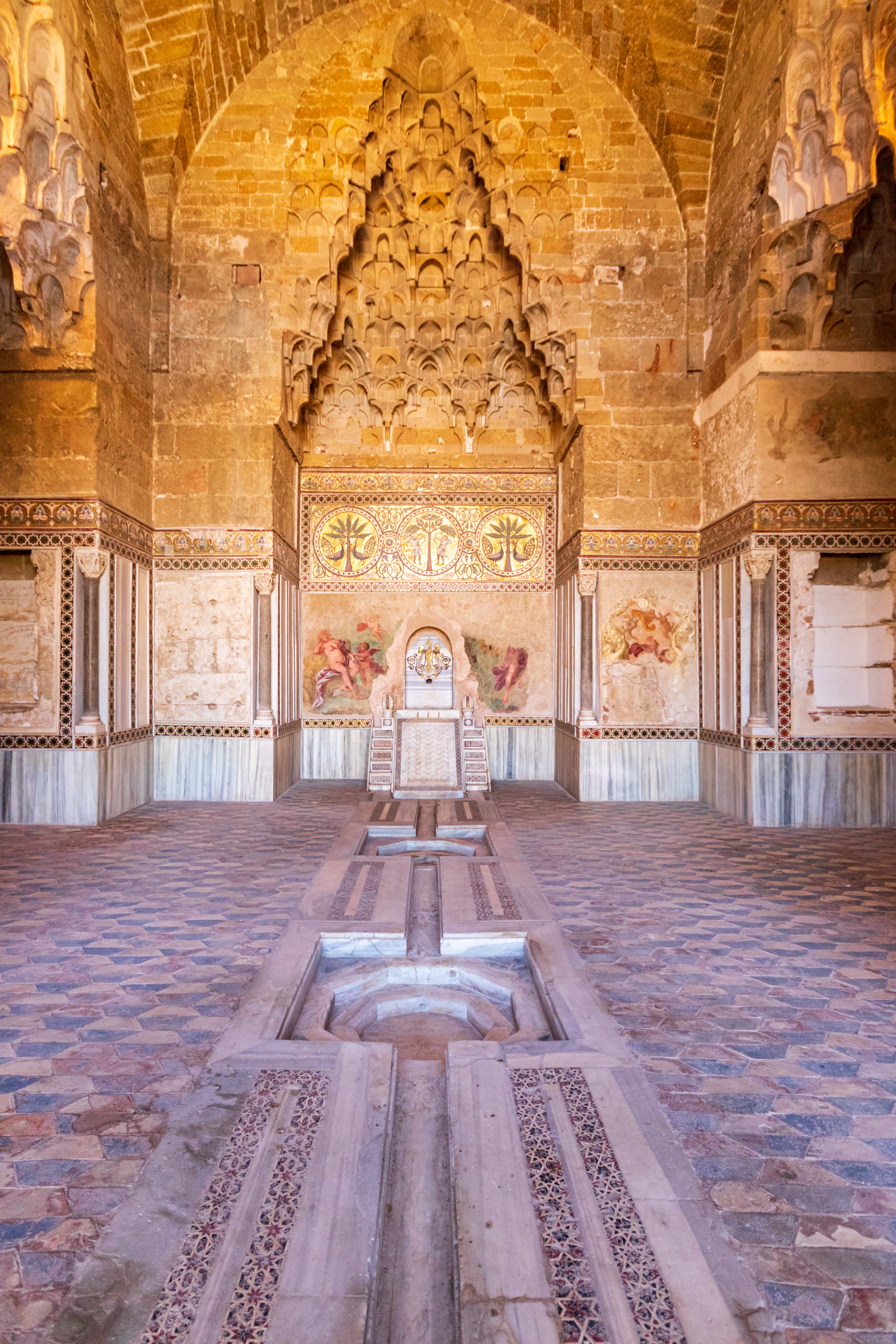
Niche with muqarnas

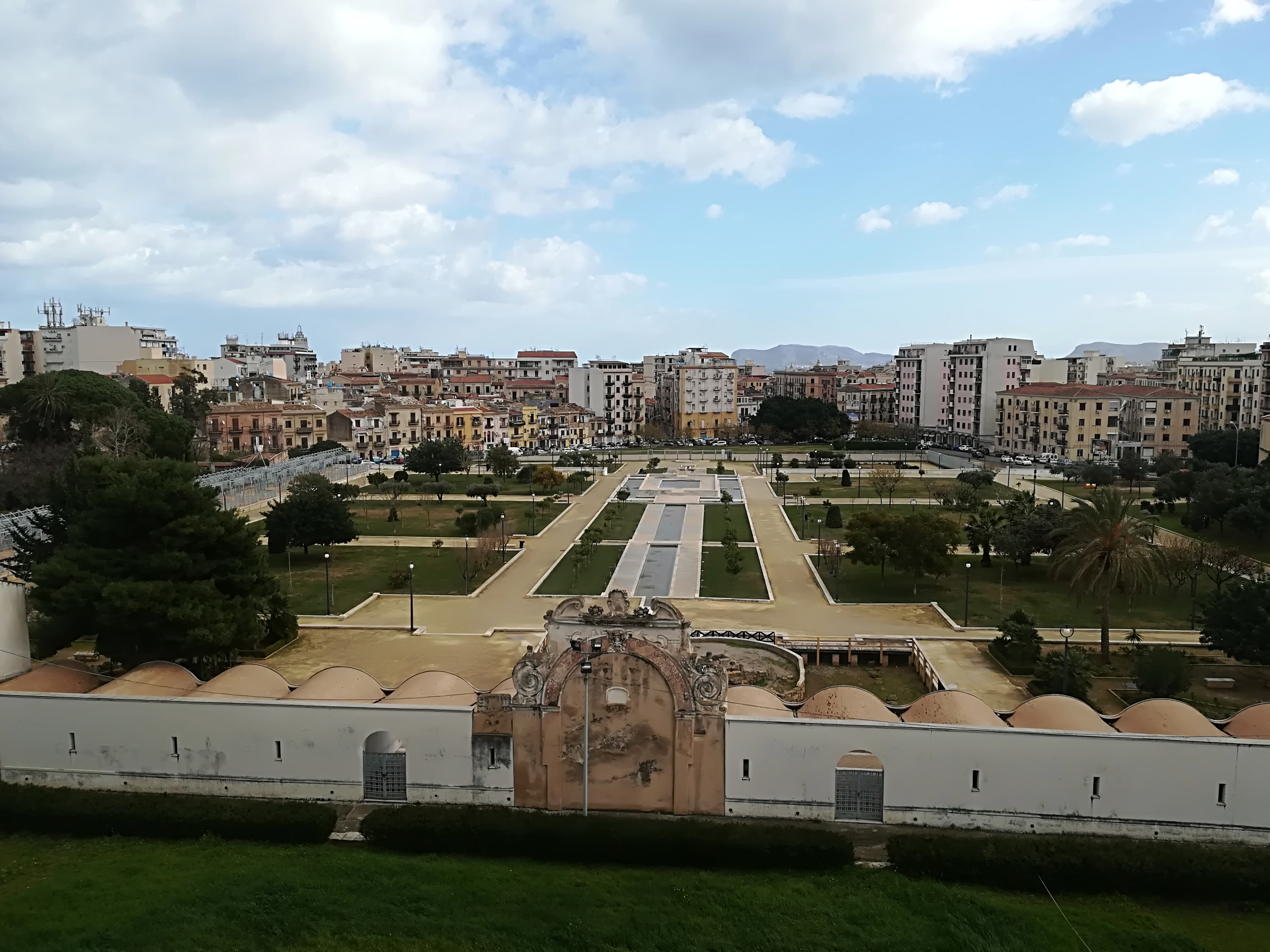
Garden and fountain

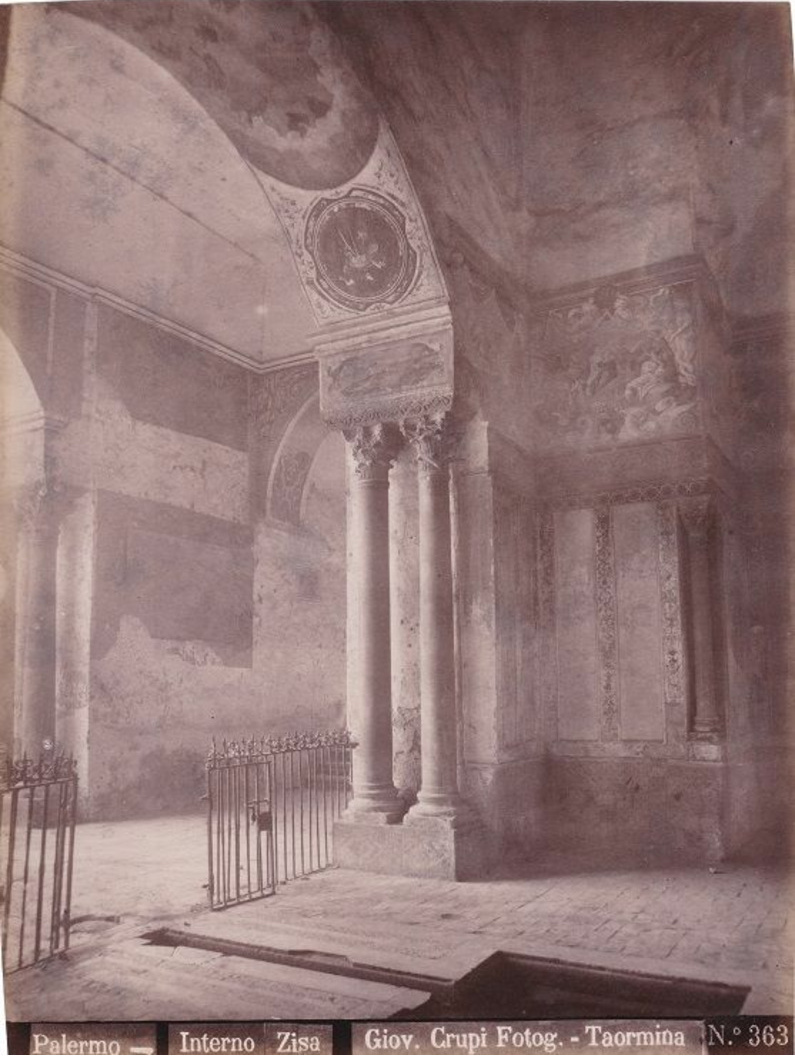
Interior before 1899, ph. Giovanni Crupi

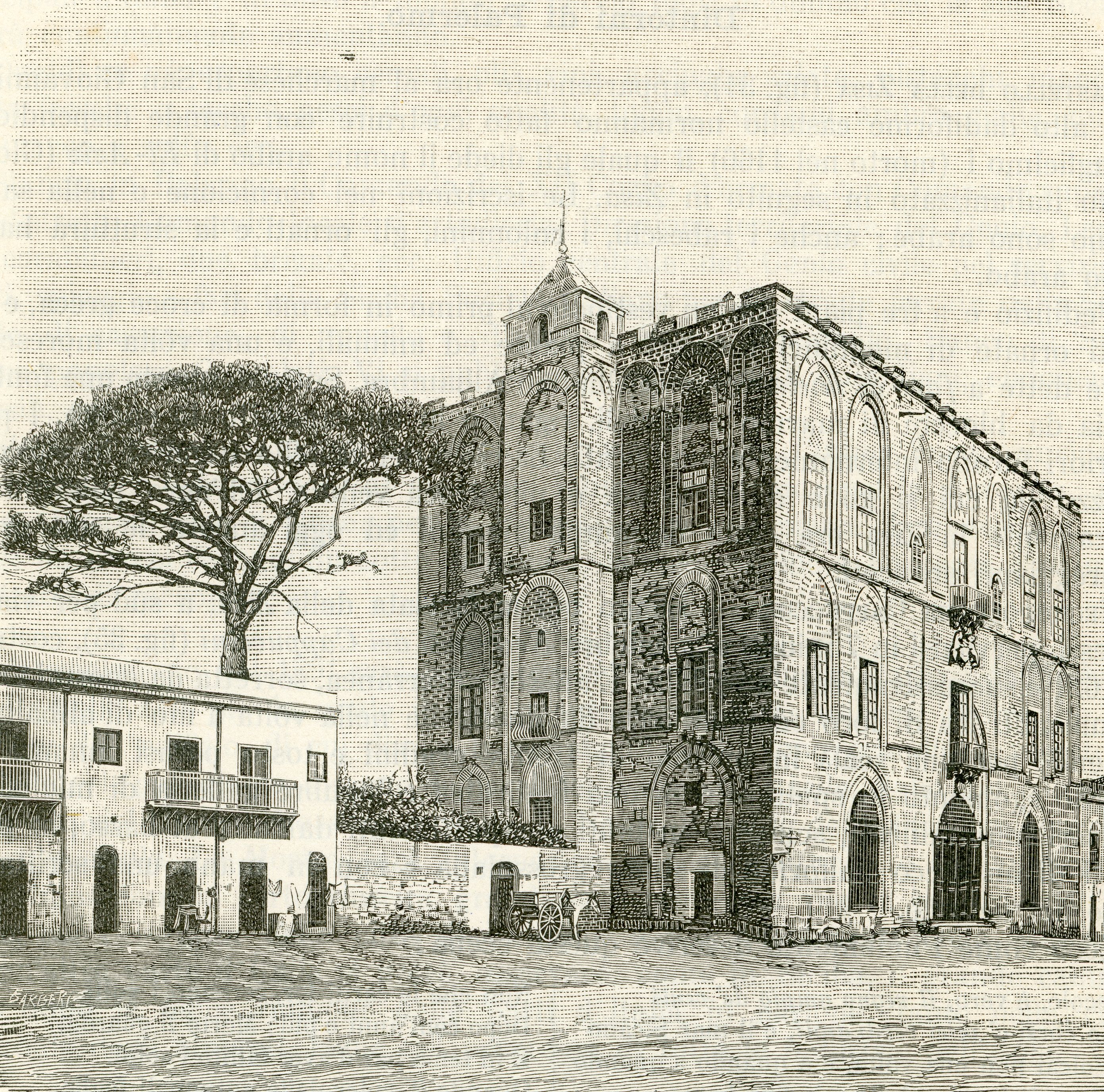
Zisa by Giuseppe Barberis, 1892

== See also ==
- List of Islamic art museums
- High medieval domes

== Bibliography ==
- Giuseppe Bellafiore: La Zisa di Palermo, Flaccovio, Palermo, 1994.
- Donald Matthew: The Norman Kingdom of Sicily, Cambridge University Press, 1992.
- John Julius Norwich: The Normans in Sicily: The Normans in the South 1016-1130 and the Kingdom in the Sun 1130-1194, Penguin, 1992.
- Seindal, René. 2003. "Zisa: Early Medieval Hunting Castle in the Arab Norman Style". http://sights.seindal.dk/ sight/76_Zisa.html.
- “La Zisa - Palermo, Italy.” Atlas Obscura, Atlas Obscura, 29 Nov. 2013, https://www.atlasobscura.com/places/la-zisa.
- "La Zisa". 1997. Storia dei Monumenti Siciliani Website. http://www.grifasi-sicilia.com/monumpalermo1.htm
- "Palazzo della Ziza". Le Normands: Peuple d'Europe Website. http://www.mondes-normands.caen.fr/angleterre/ Patrimoine_architectural/Italie/sicile/palazzi/1154_1189/38/index.htm.
