= Mukaab =

Proposed architectural project in Saudi Arabia

- المكعّب
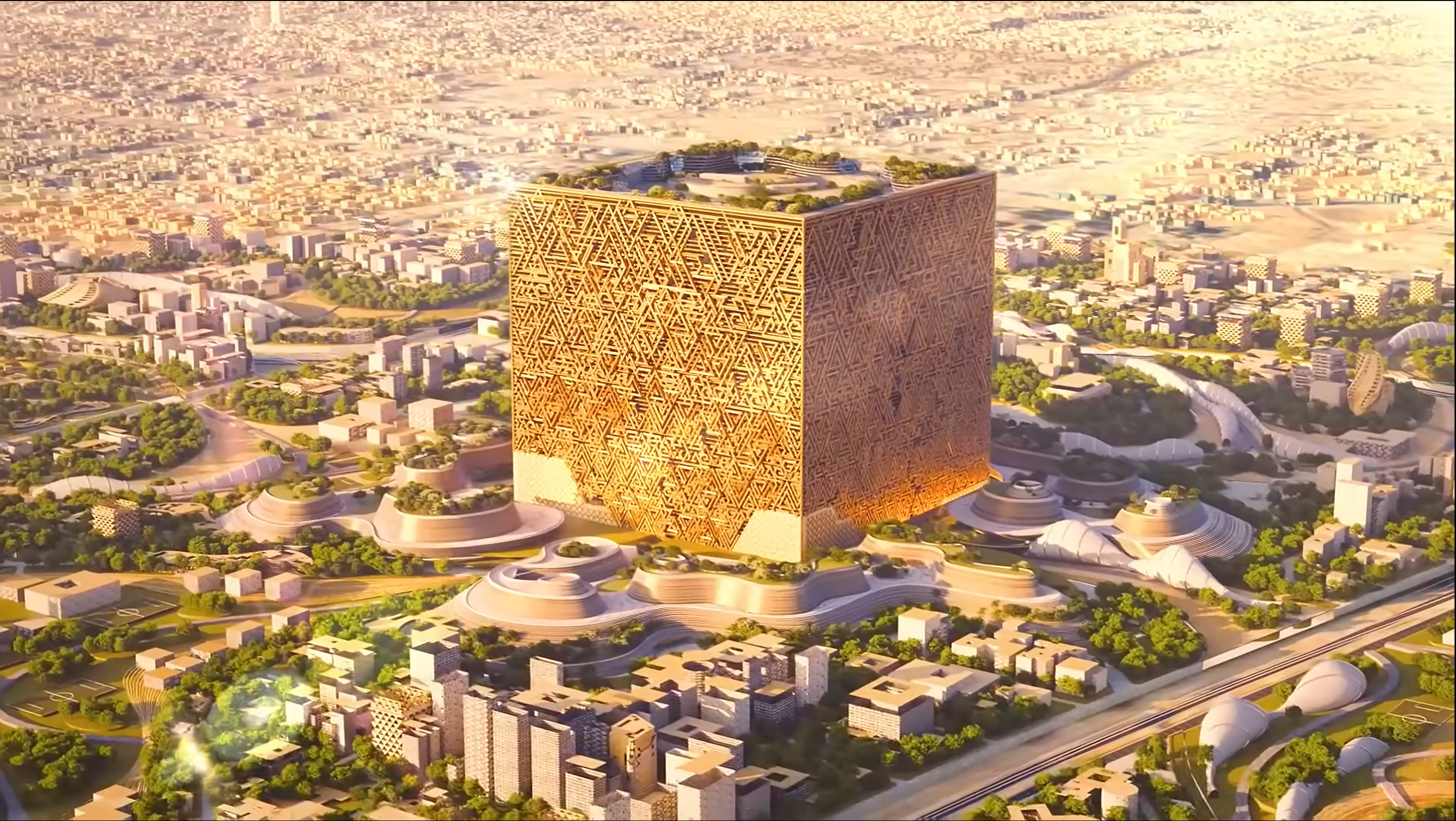
- A conceptual render of the proposed Mukaab

General information
- Status: Under construction
- Architectural style: Modern Najdi
- Location: Riyadh, Saudi Arabia
- Coordinates: 24.808118°N 46.569226°E
- Construction started: 2024
- Estimated completion: 2040
- Owner: New Murabba Development Company

Height
- Height: 400 m (1,300 ft)

Technical details
- Floor count: 70

Design and construction
- Architect: AtkinsRéalis

Website
- www.newmurabba.com

The Mukaab (Arabic: المكعّب, romanized: mukaʻʻab, lit. 'cube', [mukaʕʕab]) was a planned 400-meter (1,300 ft) tall cube-shaped skyscraper in the al-Qirawan district of Riyadh, Saudi Arabia, one of the five neighborhoods of the planned real estate development of New Murabba. Launched in February 2023, its cuboidal layout and design were inspired by the Murabba Palace. If completed, the Mukaab would have been the world’s largest building by volume. In January 2026, construction of the Mukaab was suspended.

== Background ==
The Mukaab was announced by the Kingdom's ruler Crown Prince Mohammed bin Salman on February 16, 2023, and is part of the Saudi Vision 2030 project.

The Mukaab was planned to be the centerpiece of a giant new downtown built within the Saudi capital city of Riyadh called New Murabba. It would have been the world's largest single-built structure with around 2 million square metres (22 million square feet) of interior floor space.

The project was to have been undertaken by the New Murabba Development Company of which Crown Prince Mohammed bin Salman is the President.

== Architecture ==
The cube was intended to be 400 meters (1,300 ft) tall and 400 meters (1,300 ft) wide on each of its four sides.

The design had been the subject of criticism for its similarity to the Kaaba at the Masjid al-Haram mosque in Mecca, Islam's holiest site. There have also been warnings from experts that the structure would collapse under its own weight.

The building's design was inspired by the modern Najdi architectural style.

The Mukaab's interior was to have featured a swirling tower for observation decks and restaurants.

The Mukaab was planned to feature a rooftop garden.

== History ==
In October 2024, the New Murabba Development Company stated that the site's groundwork was 86% complete.

In January 2026, amid a Saudi review of several Vision 2030 megaprojects, Reuters reported that work on the project—beyond soil excavation and pilings—was suspended. The Mukaab would be the first megaproject in Riyadh to be reassessed for feasibility. Nearby real estate development was set to continue.

== See also ==
- List of Saudi Vision 2030 projects
