= Cuba Palace =

Coordinates: 38°06′28″N 13°20′33″E

- Palazzo della Cuba
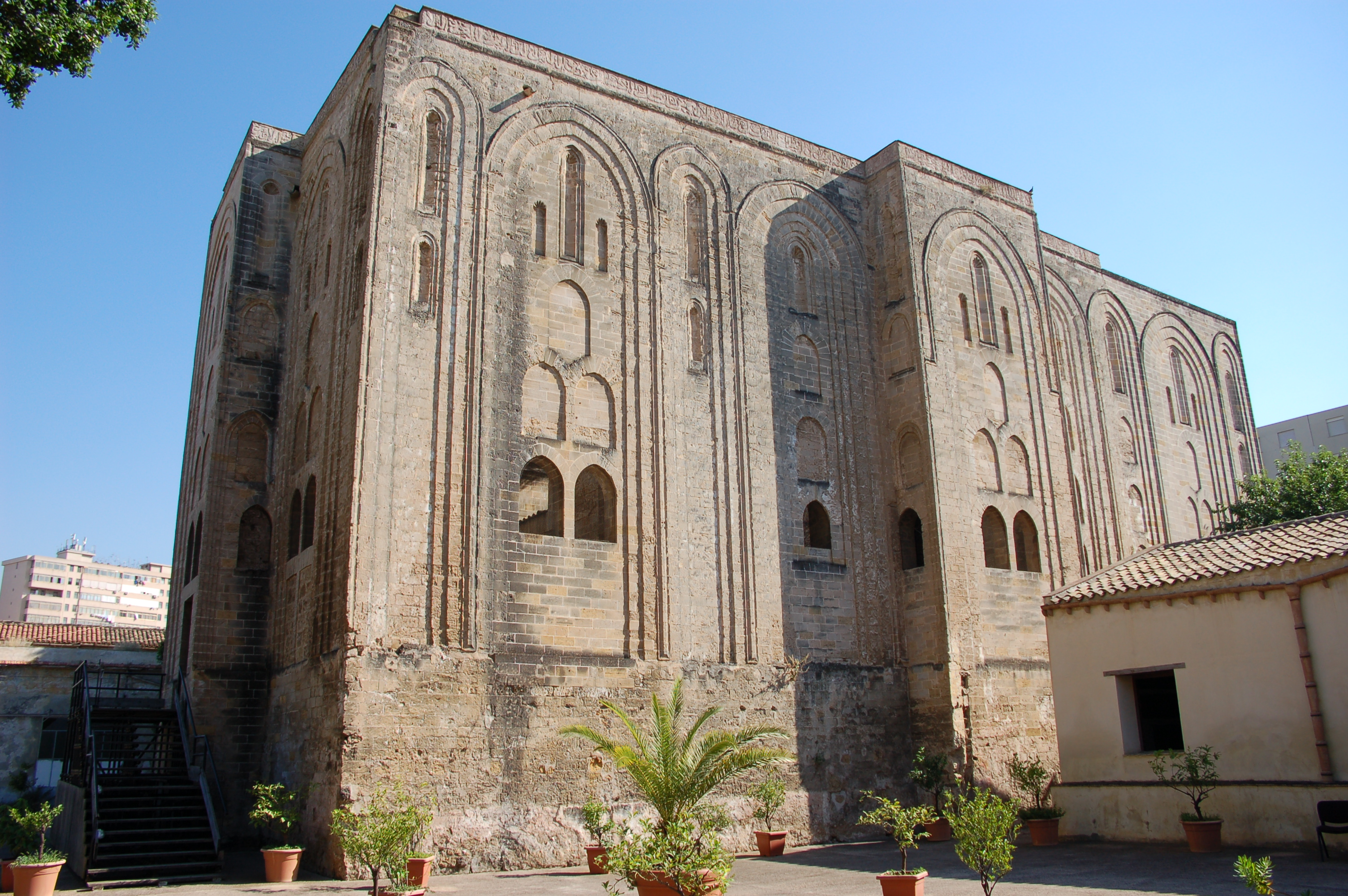
- Interactive map of the Cuba Palace area

General information
- Status: In use
- Architectural style: Arab-Norman
- Location: Sicily, Corso Calatafimi 100, 90129 Palermo, Palermo, Italy
- Current tenants: Museum
- Completed: 1180
- Client: Hauteville family

Design and construction
- Main contractor: William II of Sicily

The Cuba (Sicilian: La Cuba) is a recreational palace in the Sicilian city of Palermo, originally part of the Sollazzi Regi group of Norman palaces. It was built in 1180 by William II of Sicily in his Royal Park, together with an artificial lake. The name Cuba derives either from its cubical form, or the Arabic Qubba, "dome". It is an imitation of the Zisa palace.

It is also called "Cuba sottana" to distinguish it from the Cubula, or Little Cuba, a small pavilion built by William II for the Genoardo park. The Cuba shows strong Fatimid art influences, as it was (at least partially) designed by Arab artists still living in Palermo after the Norman conquest.

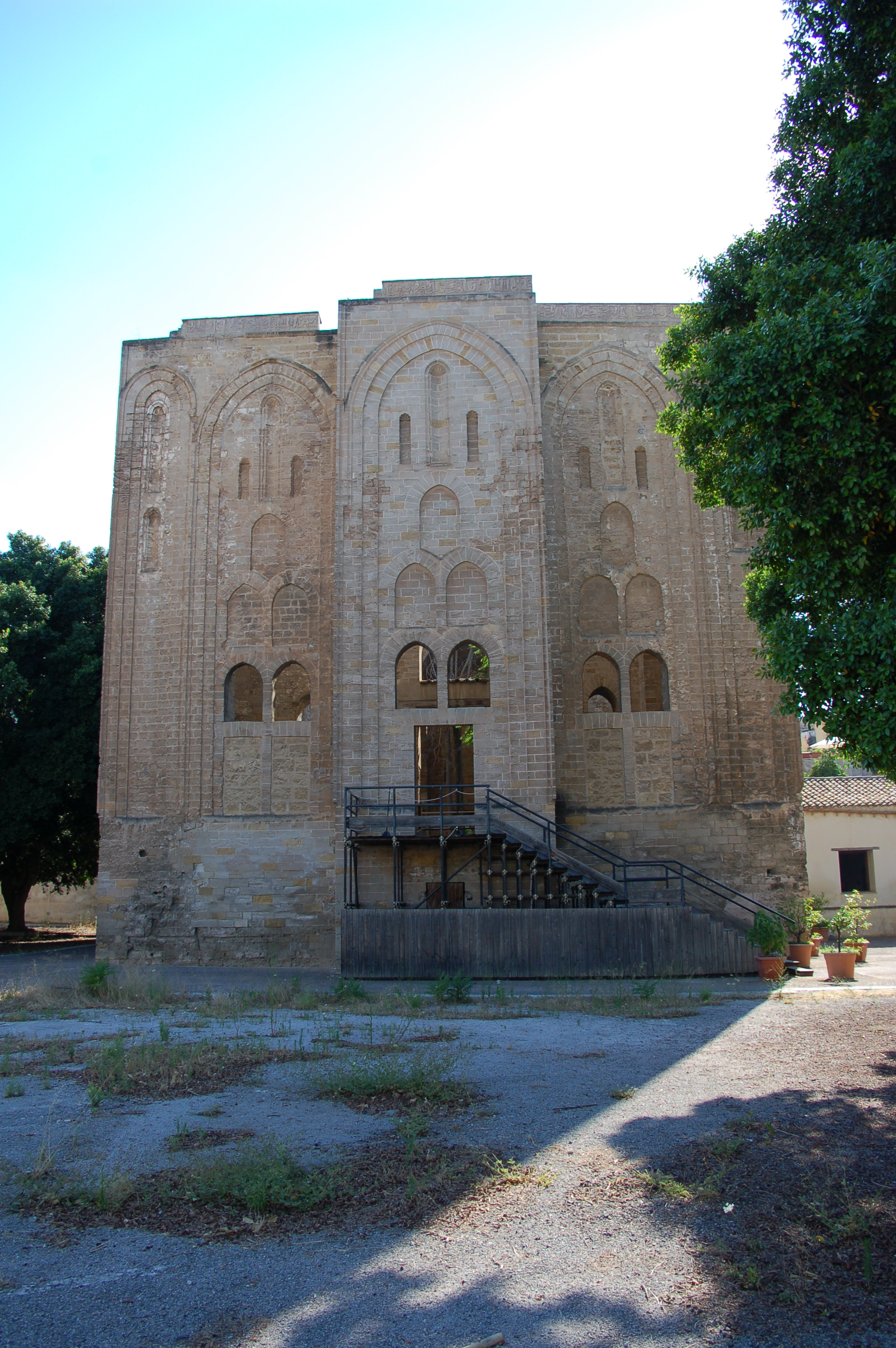
Facade

== History ==
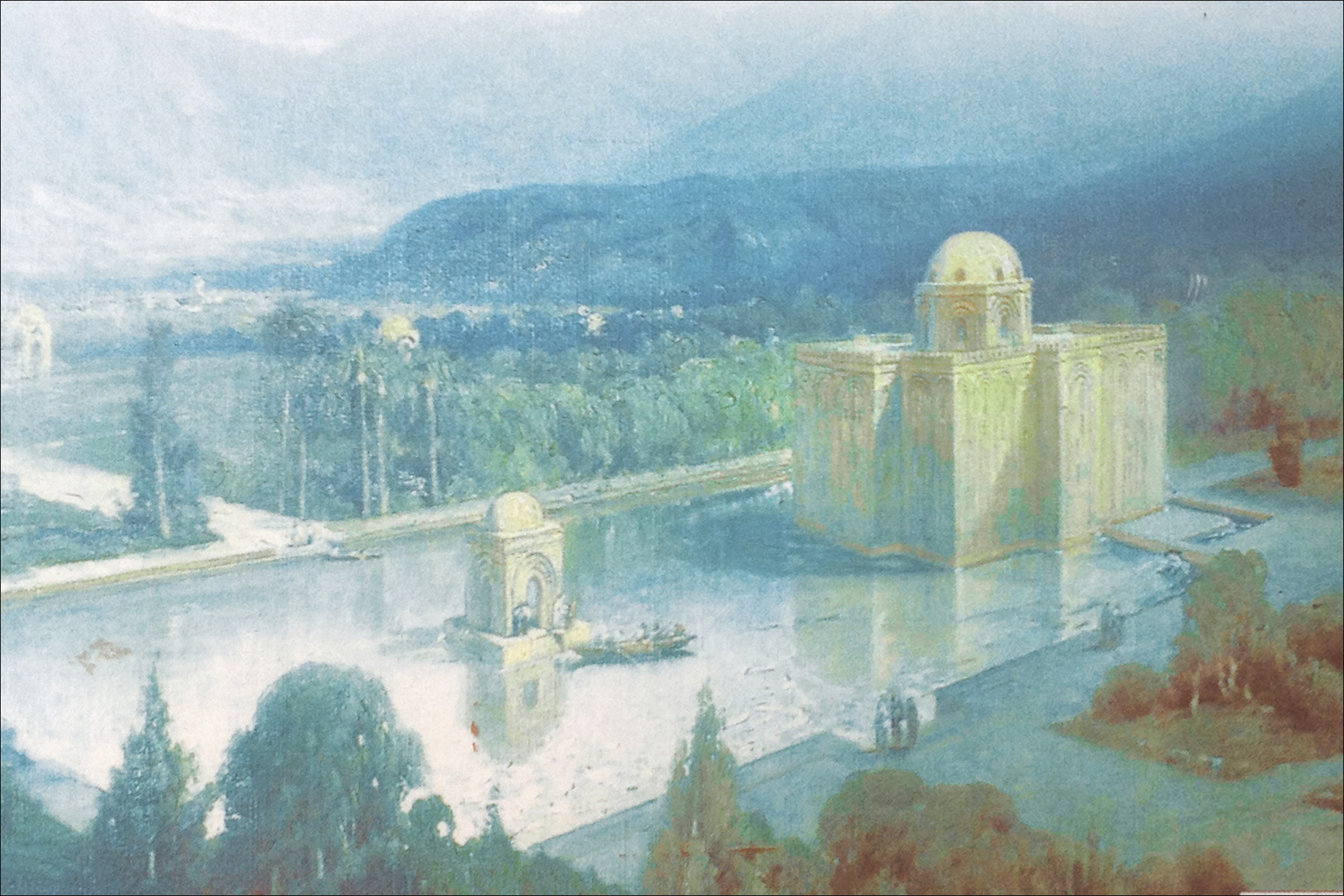
La Cuba as it may have appeared in the 12th century

The Hauteville family conquered Sicily in 1070 with the capture of Palermo by Robert Guiscard. The Cuba was built in 1180 for King William II, in the center of a large park called Jannat al-ard ("Paradise on earth"), or Genoardo. The Genoardo also included the Cuba soprana and the Cubula, and formed part of the Sollazzi Regi, a circuit of Norman court palaces located around Palermo.

The original use of the Cuba was recreational; the man-made pool served as a natural air-cooling system, for resting during the hottest hours or attending parties and ceremonies in the evening. The Cuba now appears oddly tall, since in the past, it was surrounded by an artificial lake almost eight feet deep. The largest opening, on the northern front, overlooked the water.

In the following centuries, Cuba would see various uses. The lake was drained and pavilions were built on the banks, and it was used as a lazaretto during the plague of 1576 to 1621. During the rule of Bourbon kings of Naples it was annexed to a barracks. The Cuba finally became state property in 1921.

== Structure ==
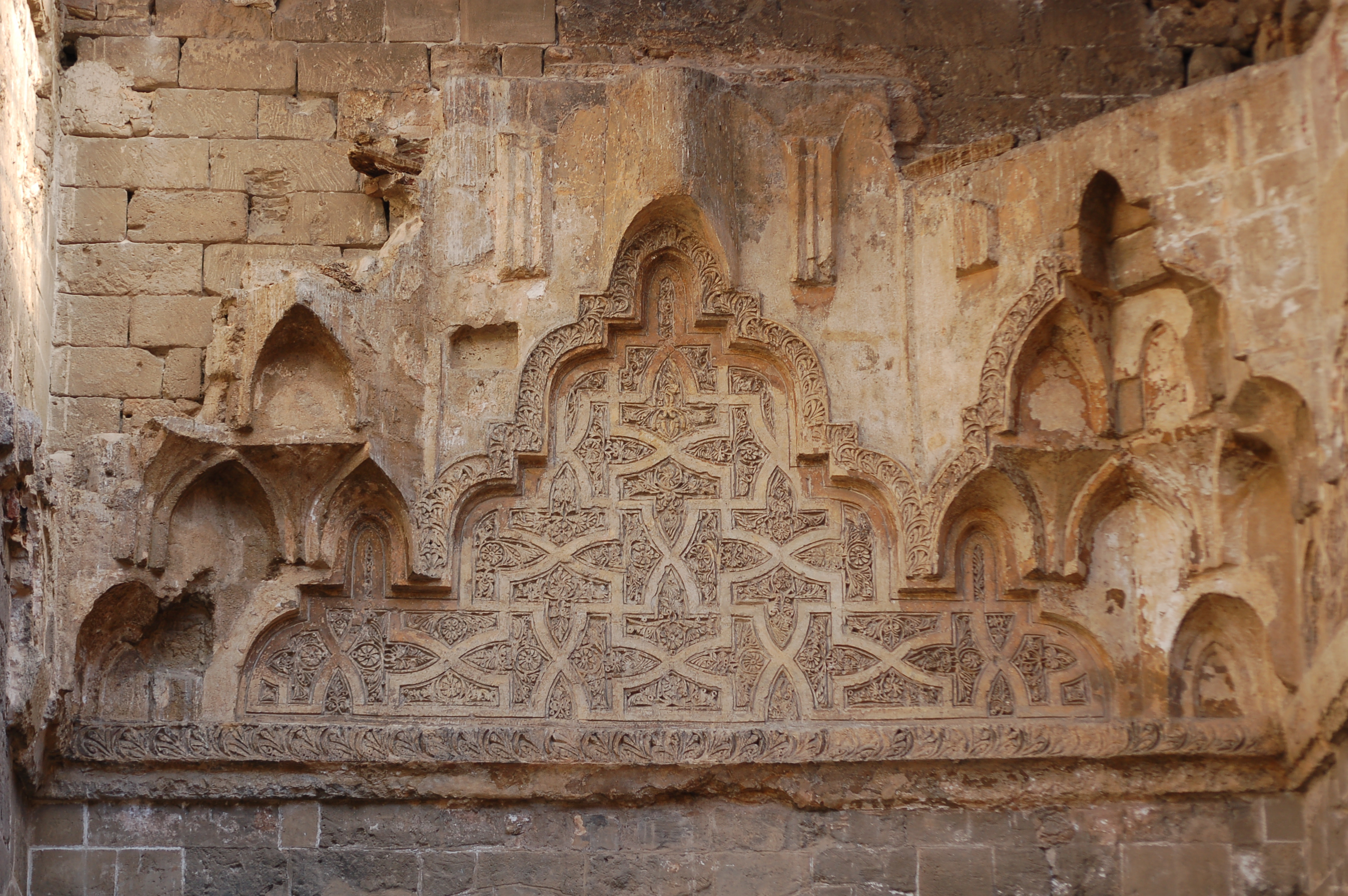
Arab architectural details, Muquarnas, in the Interior

Constructed in limestone brick, the building has a rectangular shape, 31.15 meters long and 16.80 wide. Four tower-shaped facades protrude from the center of each side. The most protruding facade was the only access to the building from the mainland. The external walls are decorated with ogival arches, and the cornice is inscribed with bands of Arabic calligraphy. A large dome surmounts the central area of the palace.

The thick walls and the few windows were due to climatic needs, offering greater resistance to the heat of the sun. Furthermore, the largest cluster of open windows was on the north-eastern side, to better receive the fresh winds from the sea, further humidified by the waters of the surrounding artificial lake.

The interior of the Cuba was divided into three aligned and connected rooms, with no private rooms. At the center are the remains of a marble fountain, a typical element of Arab buildings used to refresh the air. This fountain would have been connected to the outside pool through a subterranean passageway. The central hall was embellished with muqarnas, an architectural and ornamental solution similar to a half dome.

== In fiction ==
The Cuba's fame was such that Giovanni Boccaccio set one of the tales of the Decameron (1353) there — tale V, 6, a love story between Gian di Procida and Restituta.

== Bibliography ==
- Michele Amari, Storia dei musulmani di Sicilia, Catania, R. Prampolini,. 1933-9, 3 vols in 5 volumes.
- A. Aziz, A History of Islamic Sicily, Edinburgh, 1975.
  - F. Gabrieli - U. Scerrato, Gli Arabi in Italia, Milano, Scheiwiller, 1979.
    - A. De Simone, "Palermo nei geografi e viaggiatori arabi del Medioevo", in: Studi Magrebini, II (1968), pp. 129–189.
      - G. Caronia - V. Noto, La Cuba di Palermo, Arabi e Normanni nel XII secolo, Palermo 1989.
- V. Noto, Les palais et les jardins siciliens des rois normands, in: Trésors romans d'Italie du Sud et de Sicile, (1995), pp. 97–108

== See also ==
- William II of Sicily
- Emirate of Sicily
- Norman conquest of southern Italy
- Cuba bizantina
- Norman–Arab–Byzantine culture
