= Cuban =

Cuban or Cubans may refer to:

== Related to Cuba ==
- of or related to Cuba, a country in the Caribbean
- Cubans, people from Cuba, or of Cuban descent
  - Cuban exile, a person who left Cuba for political reasons, or a descendant thereof
- Cuban Americans, citizens of the United States who are of Cuban descent
- Cuban Spanish, the dialect of Cuba
- Culture of Cuba
- Cuban cigar
- Cuban cuisine
  - Cuban sandwich

== People with the surname ==
- Brian Cuban (born 1961), American lawyer and activist
- Mark Cuban (born 1958), American entrepreneur

== See also ==
- Kuban (disambiguation)
- List of Cubans
- Demographics of Cuba
- Cuban Boys, a British music act
- Cuban eight, a type of aerobatic maneuver
- Cuban Missile Crisis
- Cubane, a synthetic hydrocarbon compound
