= Kuban Krasnodar =

Multi-sport club in Krasnodar, Russia

Kuban Krasnodar (Russian: Кубань Краснодар) is a multi-sport club based in Krasnodar, Russia.

== Composition ==
- FC Kuban Krasnodar - football club
- HC Kuban Krasnodar - women's handball club
- HC Kuban - ice hockey club (known as Kuban Krasnodar)
- RC Kuban - rugby union club (known as Kuban Krasnodar)

== See also ==
- Kuban (disambiguation)
