= Cube (collectible card game variation) =

Collectible card game

A Cube is a variation of gameplay for collectible card games. It is a player-curated set of at least 360 cards created for the purposes of drafting, though as many as 720 (or even more) can be used. Booster packs are simulated from the contents of the cube and are used to draft cards for play. Essentially, a cube is a self-contained CCG set that requires no additional cards to play. It has everything it needs to be self-sufficient and can be used repeatedly. A cube typically accommodates up to 8 players. In some aspects, a cube is constructed to be played like a non-collectible customizable card game or ECG (Expandable Card Game), also known as a Living Card Game (LCG). A cube's construction is done with a focus on what type of metagame is desired.

== Types of cubes ==
- Thematic – These cubes use certain card types to create a theme.
- Block or Set – These cubes replicate specific expansions so players can relive a drafting experience of an older set, and often contain multiple copies of common or uncommon cards.
- Custom – These cubes use cards from the entire history of a CCG. They're built using cards based on power level, notoriety, or personal preference.
- Singleton – A cube that specifically contains only a single copy of any card included in the set.
