= Cuba, Minnesota =

Ghost town in Minnesota, U.S.

Cuba is a ghost town in Becker County, in the U.S. state of Minnesota. Cuba was named after the island of Cuba, a location in the Spanish–American War.
