= Kuban (surname) =

Kuban is a surname with multiple origins. In the Czech Republic and Slovakia, Kubáň has a feminine form, Kubáňová.

== People ==
=== Kuban ===
- Adam Kuban (born 1974), American blogger
- Ali Hassan Kuban (1929–2001), Nubian singer
- Bob Kuban (1940–2025), American musician and bandleader
- Doğan Kuban (1926–2021), Turkish architectural historian
- Glen Kuban (born 1957), American critic of creationism
- Tilman Kuban (born 1987), German politician

=== Kubáň, Kubáňová ===
- Karolína Kubáňová (born 2001), Czech tennis player
- Lukáš Kubáň (born 1987), Czech footballer
- Milan Kubáň (born 1976), Slovak slalom canoeist
