= The Cube (video game) =

2012 video game

- Nintendo 3DS version's European cover art
- Developer: Route 1 Games
- Publisher: Funbox Media
- Platforms: Nintendo 3DS; Nintendo Switch; PlayStation 3 Wii
- Release: 3DS, PlayStation 3, Wii: WW: November 16, 2012; Nintendo Switch: EU: December 1, 2022; NA: December 2, 2022; Digital release: 3DS: WW: November 21, 2013; Digital release: PS3: WW: May 14, 2014
- Genre: Puzzle
- Modes: Single-player, multiplayer

The Cube is a puzzle video game developed by Route 1 Games and published by Funbox Media. Based on the British game show of the same name, the game released on November 16, 2012, worldwide, for the Nintendo 3DS, the PlayStation 3, and Wii. The game also released on the Nintendo Switch on December 2, 2022.

== Gameplay ==
In The Cube, players navigate through a series of puzzles and obstacles within a cube-like structure. The objective is to escape by progressing through chambers and levels. The gameplay involves solving puzzles, overcoming obstacles, and manipulating the environment to unlock pathways forward. Puzzles vary in type, including logic challenges, spatial problems, and platforming sequences.

Players have to navigate three-dimensional environments and adjust the cube's layout to reveal hidden pathways. Players must also engage in platforming and exploration, avoiding hazards while searching for hidden secrets and collectibles. Difficulty increases gradually as players progress, with puzzles becoming more complex over time. The game features a total of 33 challenges. If the Cube is beaten, Extreme Mode is unlocked, featuring more extreme versions of five games: Revolution, Pathfinder, Perimeter, Rebound, and Momentum.

== Reception ==
Reception

Aggregate score
Aggregator	Score
Metacritic	40/100

Review scores
Publication	Score
Nintendo World Report	5/10
Pocket Gamer	1.5/5
Cubed3	6/10

The 3DS version of The Cube received "generally unfavorable" reviews according to review aggregator Metacritic.

Daan Koopman for Nintendo World Report rated the game 5/10, stating that "Considering the only person to win The Cube was a double Olympic gold medalist, I'm not surprised the game would be hard."

Peter Willington for Pocket Gamer rated the game 1 and a half out of 5 stars, stating that "Extremely short if you can get the hang of the infuriating mini-games, The Cube is a cynically produced tie-in of a ropey-looking British TV show."

Adam Riley for Cubed3 rated the game 6 out of 10 stars, stating that "Only some poor touch screen implementation and a lack of motivation for constantly coming back to replay to better scores mar what is otherwise a faithful accompaniment to The Cube on TV."
