= Kuba, Republic of Dagestan =

Kuba Куба Кьуба
- Selo
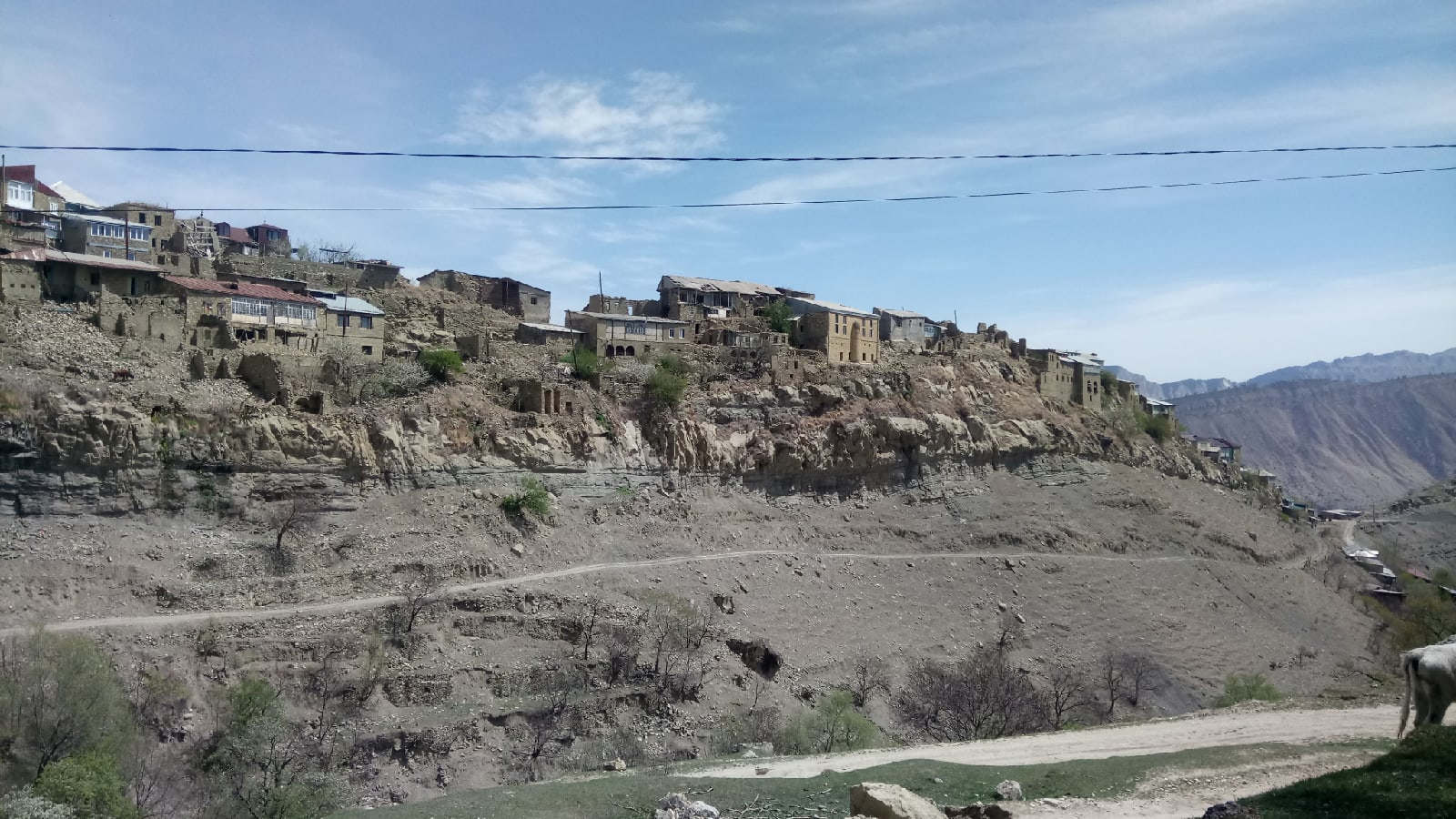

- Location within Republic of Dagestan Location within Russia
- Coordinates: 42°19′N 47°07′E
- Country: Russia
- Region: Republic of Dagestan
- District: Laksky District
- Time zone: UTC+3:00

Kuba (Russian: Куба; Lak: Кьуба) is a rural locality (a selo) and the administrative centre of Kubinsky Selsoviet, Laksky District, Republic of Dagestan, Russia. The population was 458 as of 2010. There are 3 streets.

== Geography ==
Kuba is located 22 km north of Kumukh (the district's administrative centre) by road. Tsudakhar and Karekadani are the nearest rural localities.

== Nationalities ==
Laks live there.
