= Westcoast Building =

Coordinates: 49.288988°N 123.127529°W

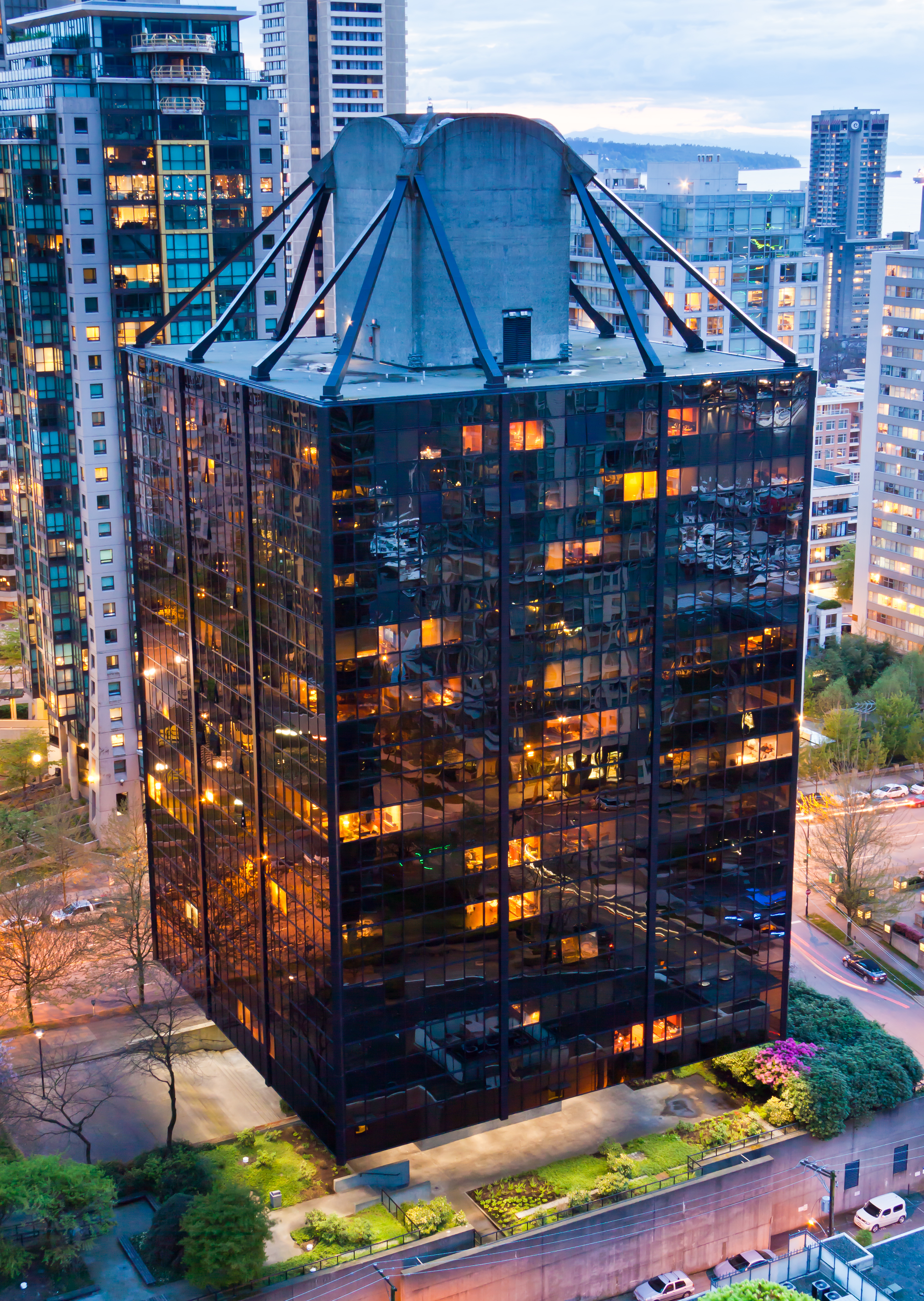

General information
- Location: 1333 West Georgia Street, Vancouver, British Columbia
- Construction started: 1968
- Completed: 1969

Technical details
- Floor count: 15

Design and construction
- Architecture firm: Rhone and Iredale

The Westcoast Building is a 15-storey former office building in Vancouver, British Columbia. It was constructed in 1969 as the headquarters of Westcoast Transmission Company. In 2005 it was converted to residential and is now called the Qube.

It was built as the headquarters for Westcoast Transmission Co. in 1969 and won the 1970–71 Design in Steel Award from the American Iron and Steel Institute. It was known as the Westcoast Transmission Building from 1969 to 2000, Duke Energy Building from 2000 to 2004, and then was renovated to condominiums as the Qube in 2005.

The building was built from the top down. The thirteen-story core was built first then steel was hung from cables at the top and the 9 occupied floors were successively built downwards.

The building's address is 1333 W. Georgia Street. It is located in Vancouver's Coal Harbour, halfway between the main business district in Vancouver's Downtown and Stanley Park.

== Cultural references ==
The building was used in the television series MacGyver as the headquarters for the fictional Phoenix Foundation, employer of the title character. It appeared in a similar role in the Highlander series and in Netflix's Altered Carbon as the headquarters of Psychasec.

== Gallery ==
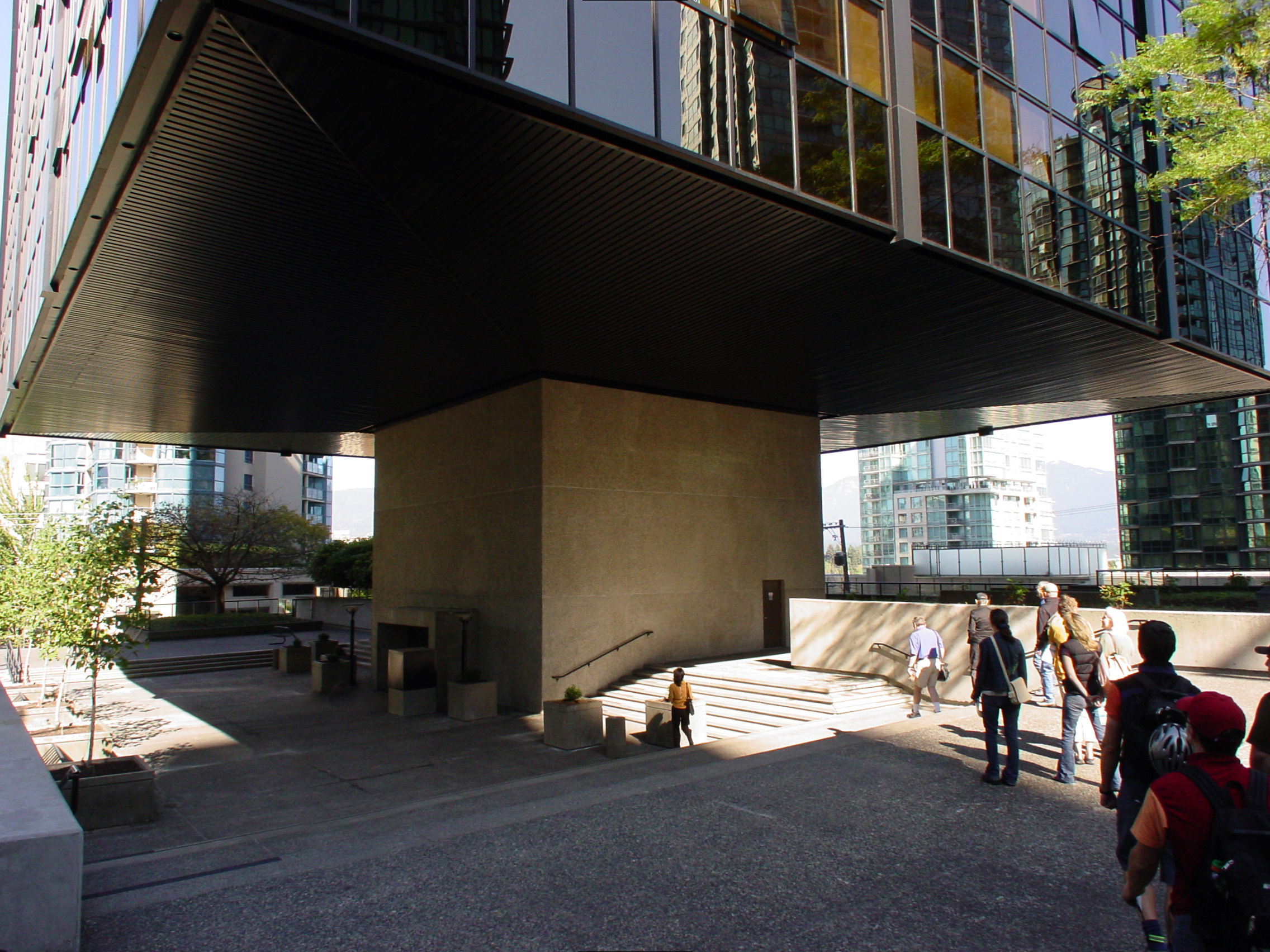
Ground level with entrance

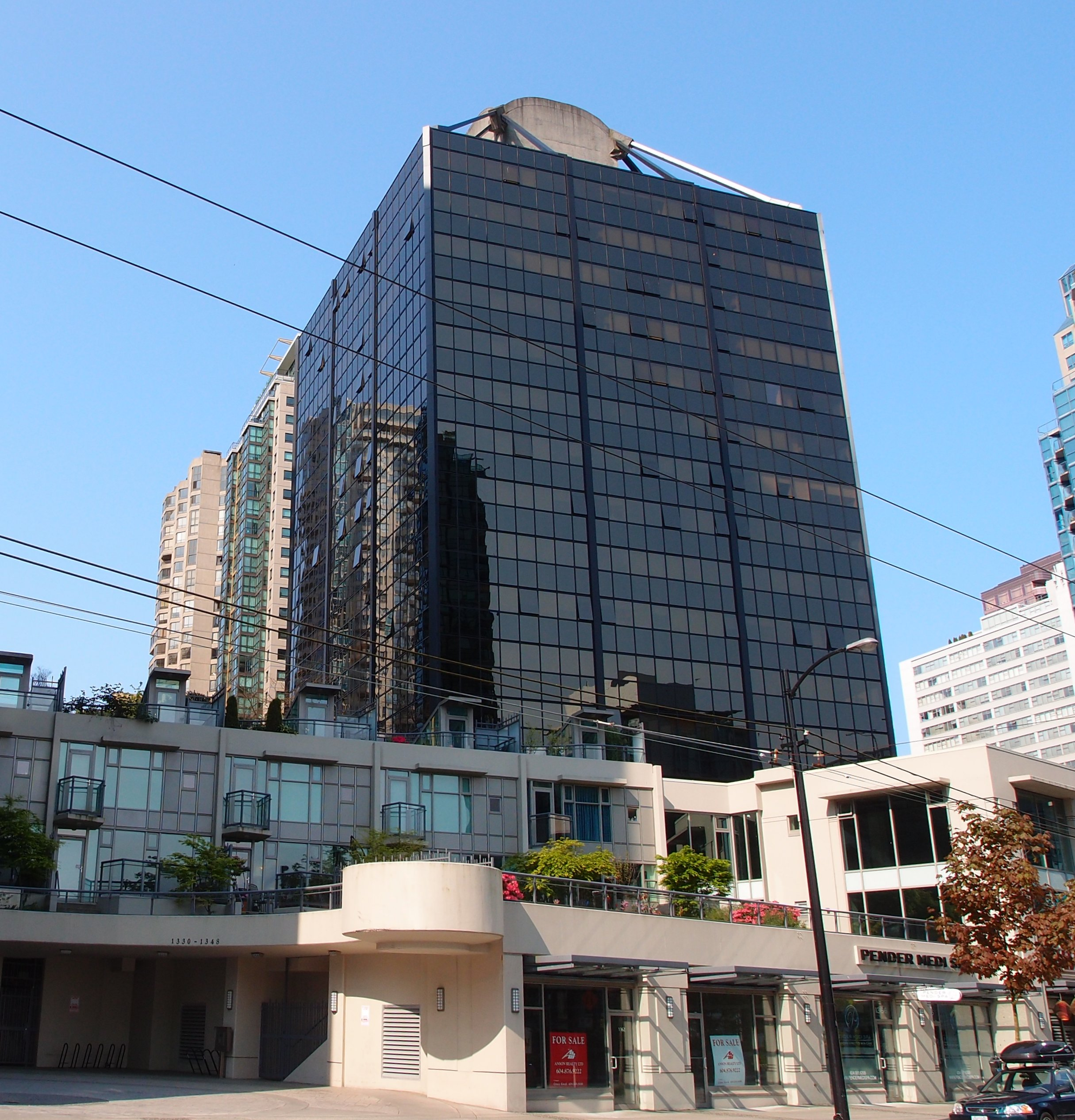
View of the North side from West Pender Street

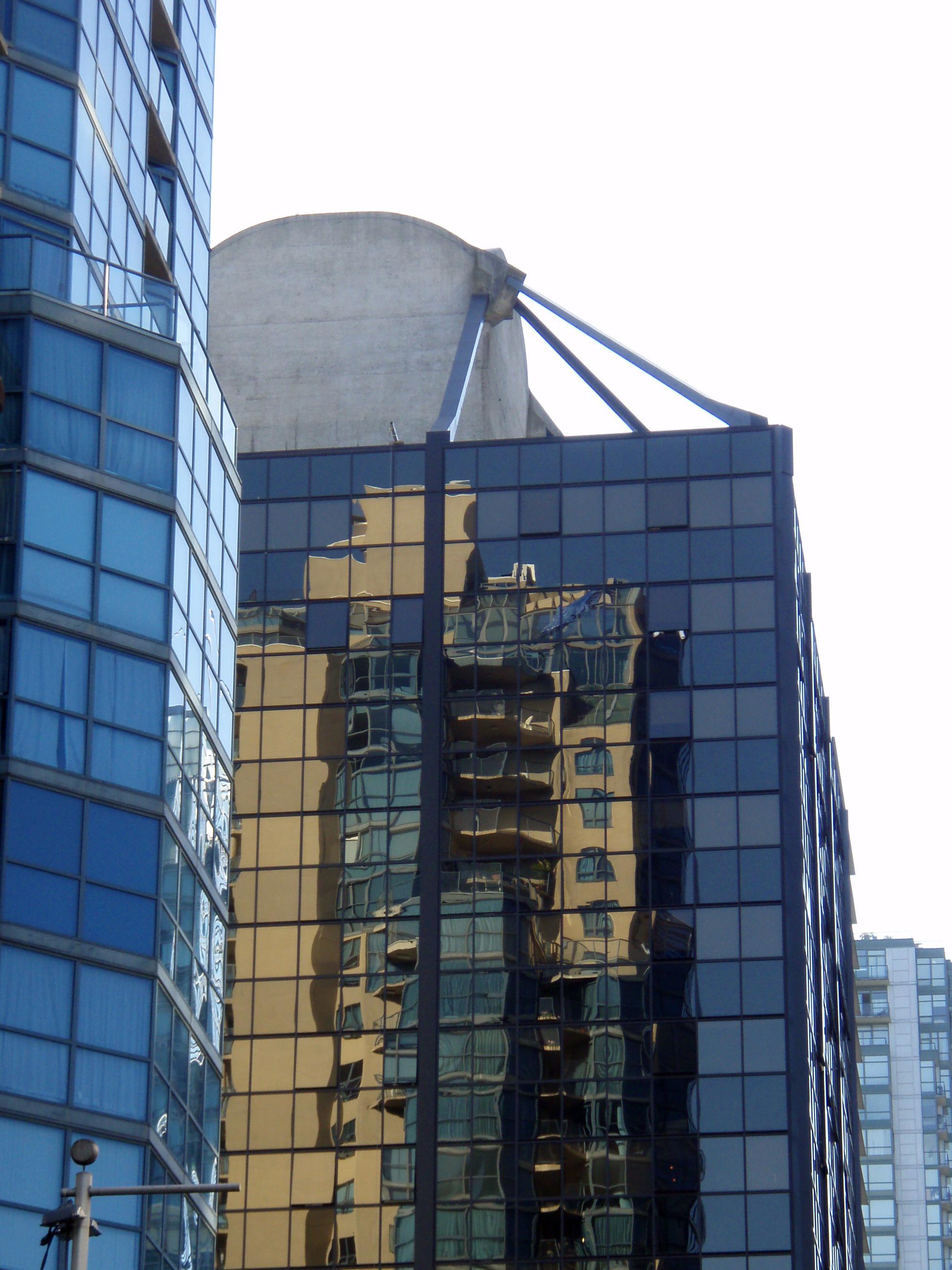
View of the West side from West Georgia Street

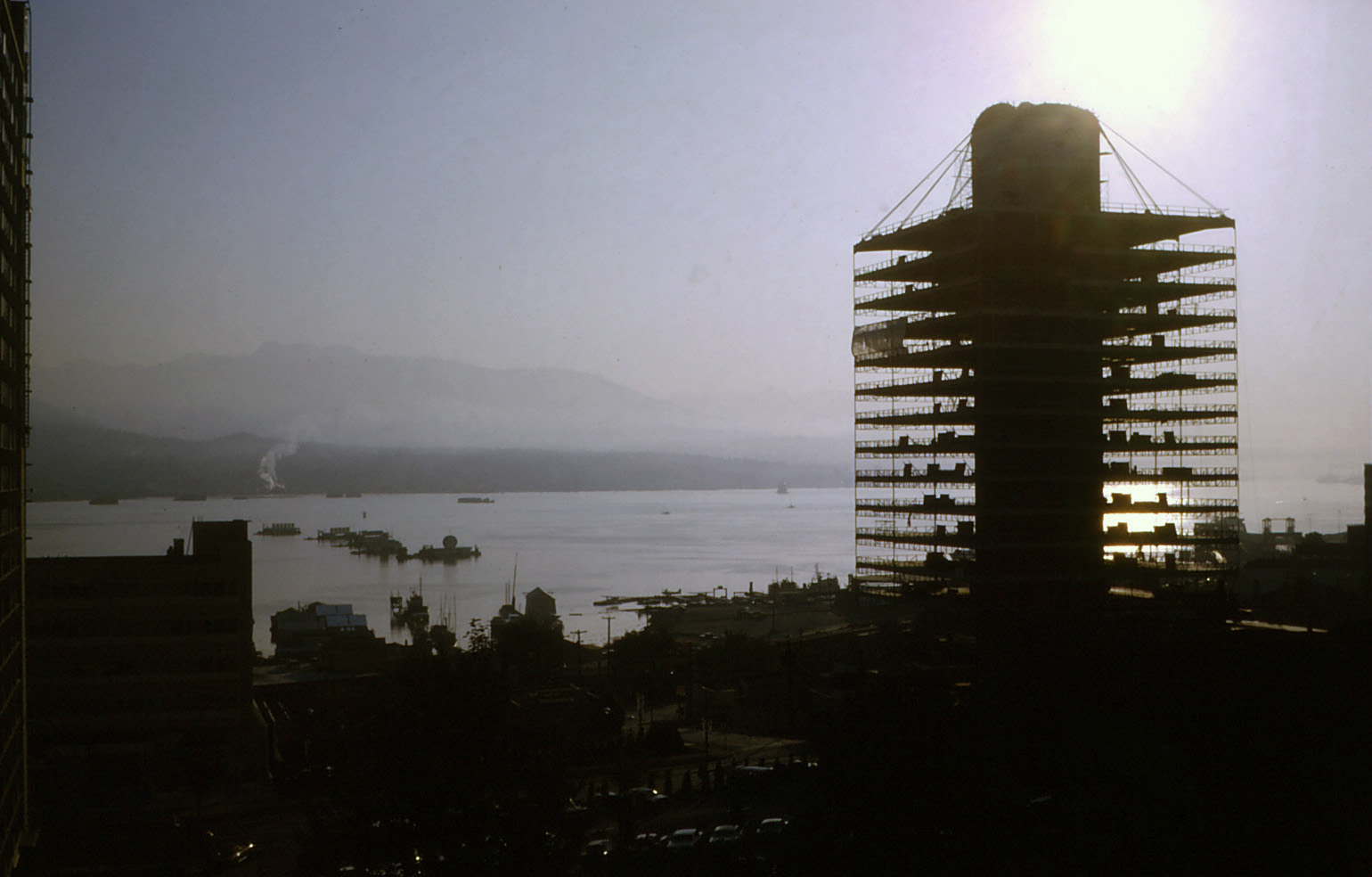
West Coast Transmission Building under construction Vancouver, B.C. Canada. Summer 1969.

== See also ==
- List of tallest buildings in Vancouver
