= List of PlayStation 3 games (A–C) =

There are currently 2304 games in this table across all pages: A to C, D to I, J to P, and Q to Z. It does not and will not include PlayStation minis, PS one Classics or PS2 Classics.

Key
3D Stereoscopic 3-D	M PlayStation Move optional M required	SV SimulView	F2P Free-to-play	E PlayStation Eye	D Digital only games

Title	Developer(s)	Release date			Options	Ref.
Title	Developer(s)	JP	PAL	NA	Options	Ref.
#killallzombies	Beatshapers	Unreleased	March 17, 2017	March 7, 2017	D	
&: Sora no Mukō de Saki Masuyō ni	Akatsuki Works	December 26, 2013	Unreleased	Unreleased		
.detuned	.theprodukkt	September 17, 2009	October 15, 2009	October 15, 2009	D	
.hack//Versus	CyberConnect2	June 28, 2012	Unreleased	Unreleased	3D	
007 Legends	Eurocom	Unreleased	October 19, 2012	October 16, 2012		
007: Quantum of Solace	Treyarch	Unreleased	October 31, 2008	November 4, 2008		
100-Yen Gomibako	SCEI	July 16, 2009	Unreleased	Unreleased	D	
1942: Joint Strike	Backbone Entertainment	Unreleased	July 24, 2008	July 24, 2008		
2010 FIFA World Cup South Africa	EA Canada	May 13, 2010	April 29, 2010	April 27, 2010		
2014 FIFA World Cup Brazil	EA Canada	April 24, 2014	April 17, 2014	April 15, 2014		
3 on 3 NHL Arcade	EA Canada	February 12, 2009	February 5, 2009	February 5, 2009		
3D Dot Game Heroes	Silicon Studio	November 5, 2009	May 14, 2010	May 11, 2010		
3D Ultra Minigolf Adventures 2	Konami	Unreleased	Unreleased	May 11, 2010	D	
428: Shibuya Scramble	Chunsoft	September 3, 2009	Unreleased	Unreleased		
4 Elements HD	Boolat Games	Unreleased	August 31, 2011	August 30, 2011	D M	
50 Cent: Blood on the Sand	Swordfish Studios	July 23, 2009	February 20, 2009	February 24, 2009		
5 Star Wrestling	Serious Parody	Unreleased	March 18, 2015	March 17, 2015	D	
99Vidas	QUByte Interactive	Unreleased	Unreleased	July 18, 2017	D	
A-Men	Bloober Team	Unreleased	October 17, 2012	March 26, 2013	D	
A-Men 2	Bloober Team	Unreleased	November 6, 2013	November 5, 2013	D	
A Boy and His Blob	Abstraction Games	Unreleased	June 28, 2016	June 28, 2016	D	
Aabs Animals	Aabs	December 19, 2013	December 18, 2013	December 17, 2013	D	
Aaru's Awakening	Lumenox Games	August 5, 2015	April 8, 2015	April 7, 2015	D	
Absolute Supercars (Note: update for SuperCar Challenge.)	Eutechnyx	August 29, 2013	November 6, 2012	November 6, 2012		
Abyss Odyssey	ACE Team	Unreleased	July 16, 2014	July 15, 2014	D	
Accel World: Ginyoku no Kakusei	Bandai Namco Games	September 13, 2012	Unreleased	Unreleased		
Accel World: Kasoku no Chouten	Bandai Namco Games	January 31, 2013	Unreleased	Unreleased		
Acceleration of Suguri X Edition	Rockin' Android	Unreleased	February 16, 2011	February 15, 2011	D	
AC/DC Live: Rock Band Track Pack (Note: stand-alone expansion for Rock Band.)	Harmonix Music Systems	Unreleased	April 19, 2009	November 18, 2008		
Ace Combat: Assault Horizon	Namco	October 13, 2011	October 14, 2011	October 11, 2011		
Ace Combat Infinity	Namco	May 20, 2014	May 28, 2014	May 27, 2014	D F2P	
Action Henk	RageSquid	Unreleased	Unreleased	January 31, 2013	D	
Adidas miCoach	Lightning Fish	Unreleased	July 24, 2012	July 13, 2012	M	
Adam's Venture Chronicles	Vertigo Games	Unreleased	February 4, 2014	February 4, 2014		
The Adventures of Tintin: The Secret of the Unicorn	Ubisoft Montpellier	Unreleased	October 21, 2011	December 6, 2011	3D M	
Adventure Time: Explore the Dungeon Because I Don't Know!	WayForward Technologies	Unreleased	November 14, 2013^{AU} November 15, 2013^{EU}	November 19, 2013		
Adventure Time: Finn & Jake Investigations	Vicious Cycle Software	Unreleased	November 6, 2015	October 20, 2015		
Adventure Time: The Secret of the Nameless Kingdom	WayForward Technologies	November 18, 2014	November 18, 2014	November 18, 2014		
Aegis of Earth: Protonovus Assault	Acquire	July 2, 2015	April 22, 2016	March 15, 2016		
AFL Live	Big Ant Studios	Unreleased	April 21, 2011^{AU}	Unreleased		
AFL Live 2	Wicked Witch Software	Unreleased	September 12, 2013^{AU}	Unreleased		
Afrika •Hakuna Matata^{Asia}	Rhino Studios	August 28, 2008	Unreleased	October 13, 2009		
Afro Samurai	Namco Bandai	Unreleased	March 27, 2009	January 27, 2009		
After Burner Climax	Sega	April 21, 2010	April 22, 2010	April 22, 2010	D	
Age of Booty	Certain Affinity	Unreleased	November 27, 2008	November 13, 2008	D	
Air Conflicts: Pacific Carriers	Games Farm	Unreleased	December 7, 2012	August 6, 2013	M	
Air Conflicts: Secret Wars	Games Farm	Unreleased	July 8, 2011	November 15, 2011	M	
Air Conflicts: Vietnam	Games Farm	September 12, 2013	October 18, 2013	November 19, 2013	M	
Akatsuki no Goei Trinity	M2	September 20, 2012	Unreleased	Unreleased		
AKB1/149 Ren'ai Sōsenkyo	Namco Bandai Games	September 12, 2013	Unreleased	Unreleased		
Akiba's Trip: Undead & Undressed	Acquire / XSEED / NIS America	November 7, 2013	October 10, 2014	August 12, 2014		
Akimi Village	NinjaBee	Unreleased	June 21, 2011	June 14, 2011	D	
Alex Kidd in Miracle World	Sega	May 23, 2012	May 23, 2012	May 22, 2012	D	
Alice: Madness Returns	Spicy Horse	July 21, 2011	June 16, 2011	June 14, 2011		
Alien Breed	Team17	Unreleased	February 6, 2013	February 12, 2013	D	
Alien Breed 2: Assault	Team17	Unreleased	December 8, 2010	December 7, 2010	D	
Alien Breed 3: Descent	Team17	Unreleased	February 23, 2011	February 22, 2011	D	
Alien Breed: Impact	Team17	Unreleased	September 1, 2010	October 5, 2010	D	
Alien Rage	CI Games	February 6, 2014	October 23, 2013	October 22, 2013	D	
Alien Shooter	Sigma Team	Unreleased	January 8, 2016	March 8, 2016	D	
Alien Spidy	Enigma Software Productions	Unreleased	May 8, 2013	July 16, 2013	D	
Alien Zombie Mega Death	PomPom Games	Unreleased	July 6, 2011	June 21, 2011	D	
Aliens: Colonial Marines	Gearbox Software	Unreleased	February 12, 2013	February 12, 2013		
Alien: Isolation	Creative Assembly	Unreleased	October 7, 2014	October 7, 2014		
Aliens vs. Predator	Rebellion Developments	Unreleased	February 19, 2010	February 16, 2010		
All-Pro Football 2K8	Visual Concepts	Unreleased	Unreleased	July 16, 2007		
All Zombies Must Die!	DoubleSix	Unreleased	January 4, 2012	December 27, 2011	D 3D	
Alone in the Dark: Inferno	Eden Studios	December 25, 2008	November 21, 2008	November 18, 2008		
Alpha Protocol	Obsidian Entertainment	Unreleased	May 28, 2010	June 1, 2010		
Altered Beast	Sega	August 31, 2011	September 21, 2011	September 20, 2011	D	
The Amazing Spider-Man	Beenox	Unreleased	June 29, 2012	June 26, 2012	M	
The Amazing Spider-Man 2	Beenox	Unreleased	May 2, 2014	April 29, 2014		
American McGee's Alice (Note: DLC for Alice: Madness Returns.)	Spicy Horse	Unreleased	Unreleased	June 14, 2011	D	
American Mensa Academy	Silverball Studios	Unreleased	December 12, 2012	February 5, 2013		
Amplitude	Harmonix	Unreleased	April 5, 2016	April 5, 2016	D	
AMY	VectorCell	Unreleased	January 11, 2012	January 17, 2012	D	
Anarchy: Rush Hour	Gaijin Entertainment	Unreleased	May 5, 2010	March 25, 2010	D	
Anarchy Reigns	PlatinumGames	July 5, 2012	January 11, 2013	January 8, 2013		
Angel Love Online	UserJoy Technology	July 7, 2011	Unreleased	Unreleased	D F2P	
Angel Senki	UserJoy Technology	July 7, 2011	Unreleased	Unreleased		
Anna: Extended Edition	Dreampainters	Unreleased	April 1, 2015	March 31, 2015	D	
Anomaly: Warzone Earth	11 bit studios	Unreleased	August 29, 2012	September 11, 2012	D	
Another World: 20th Anniversary Edition	The Digital Lounge	Unreleased	June 25, 2014	July 8, 2014	D	
Another Century's Episode: R	From Software	August 19, 2010	Unreleased	Unreleased		
Angry Birds Star Wars	Rovio Entertainment	Unreleased	November 1, 2013	October 29, 2013	M	
Angry Birds Trilogy	Rovio Entertainment	Unreleased	September 28, 2013	September 25, 2013	M	
Apache: Air Assault	Gaijin Entertainment	Unreleased	November 19, 2011	November 16, 2011		
Apples to Apples	ImaginEngine	Unreleased	Unreleased	December 20, 2011	D	
Aqua Panic!	Eko Software	Unreleased	April 8, 2010	October 19, 2010	D	
Aqua Vita •Aquatopia^{US}	London Studio, Playlogic Entertainment	Unreleased	October 25, 2007	November 20, 2007	D E	
Aquanaut's Holiday: Hidden Memories	Irem	September 25, 2008	Unreleased	Unreleased		
Aquapazza: Aquaplus Dream Match	Examu	August 30, 2012	Unreleased	November 19, 2013		
Ar Nosurge	Gust Co. Ltd.	March 6, 2014	September 26, 2014	September 23, 2014		
Arcana Heart 3	Examu	January 13, 2011	August 19, 2011	April 19, 2011		
Arcana Heart 3: Love Max!!!!! (Note: update for Arcana Heart 3.)	Examu	May 29, 2014	November 20, 2014	September 23, 2014		
Arcania: The Complete Tale	Black Forest Games	Unreleased	July 15, 2013	August 30, 2013		
Ar tonelico Qoga: Knell of Ar Ciel	Gust Corporation	January 28, 2010	April 1, 2011	March 15, 2011		
Arkedo Series – 001 JUMP!	Arkedo Studio	Unreleased	August 24, 2011	October 16, 2012	D	
Arkedo Series – 002 SWAP!	Arkedo Studio	Unreleased	September 21, 2011	October 16, 2012	D	
Arkedo Series – 003 PIXEL!	Arkedo Studio	Unreleased	September 28, 2011	October 16, 2012	D	
Armageddon Riders	Targem Games	Unreleased	June 2, 2011	June 3, 2011	D	
Armored Core 4	From Software	December 21, 2006	June 22, 2007	March 20, 2007		
Armored Core: For Answer	From Software	March 19, 2008	October 31, 2008	September 16, 2008		
Armored Core V	From Software	January 26, 2012	March 23, 2012	March 20, 2012		
Armored Core: Verdict Day	From Software	September 26, 2013	September 27, 2013	September 24, 2013		
Army of Two	EA Montreal	March 19, 2008	March 7, 2008	March 4, 2008		
Army of Two: The 40th Day	EA Montreal	March 25, 2010	January 15, 2010	January 12, 2010		
Army of Two: The Devil's Cartel	Visceral Montreal	March 28, 2013	March 29, 2013	March 26, 2013		
Arslan: The Warriors of Legend	Koei Tecmo Games	February 9, 2016	Unreleased	Unreleased		
Arthur and the Revenge of Maltazard	Ubisoft	Unreleased	September 24, 2010	Unreleased		
Asdivine Hearts	Kemco	December 13, 2016	Unreleased	January 7, 2017	D	
Ashes Cricket 2009	Transmission Games	Unreleased	August 6, 2009	Unreleased		
Assassin's Creed	Ubisoft Montreal	November 29, 2007	November 16, 2007	November 14, 2007		
Assassin's Creed II	Ubisoft Montreal	December 3, 2009	November 19, 2009	November 17, 2009		
Assassin's Creed III	Ubisoft Montreal	Unreleased	October 31, 2012	October 30, 2012	3D	
Assassin's Creed: Liberation HD	Ubisoft Sofia	March 27, 2014	January 15, 2014	January 14, 2014	D	
Assassin's Creed IV: Black Flag	Ubisoft Montreal	November 28, 2013	November 1, 2013	October 29, 2013		
Assassin's Creed: Brotherhood	Ubisoft Montreal	December 9, 2010	November 19, 2010	November 16, 2010		
Assassin's Creed: Revelations	Ubisoft Montreal	December 1, 2011	November 15, 2011	November 15, 2011	3D	
Assassin's Creed Rogue	Ubisoft Sofia	December 11, 2014	November 13, 2014	November 11, 2014		
Assault Heroes	Wanako Games	Unreleased	Unreleased	January 28, 2010	D	
Astro Tripper	PomPom Games	August 19, 2010	December 11, 2008	March 12, 2009	D	
Asura's Wrath	CyberConnect2	February 23, 2012	February 24, 2012	February 21, 2012		
Atelier Ayesha: The Alchemist of Dusk	Gust Corporation	June 28, 2012	March 8, 2013	March 5, 2013		
Atelier Escha & Logy: Alchemists of the Dusk Sky	Gust Corporation	June 27, 2013	March 11, 2014	March 7, 2014		
Atelier Meruru: The Apprentice of Arland	Gust Corporation	June 23, 2011	May 25, 2012	May 29, 2012		
Atelier Rorona: The Alchemist of Arland	Gust Corporation	June 25, 2009	October 22, 2010	September 28, 2010		
Atelier Rorona Plus: The Alchemist of Arland (Note: update for Atelier Rorona: The Alchemist of Arland.)	Gust Corporation	November 21, 2013	June 20, 2014	June 24, 2014		
Atelier Shallie: Alchemists of the Dusk Sea	Gust Corporation	July 17, 2014	March 13, 2015	March 10, 2015		
Atelier Sophie: The Alchemist of the Mysterious Book •Sophie no Atelier: Fushigi na Hon no Renkinjutsushi^{JP}	Gust Corporation	November 19, 2015	Unreleased	Unreleased		
Atelier Totori: The Adventurer of Arland	Gust Corporation	June 24, 2010	September 27, 2011	September 30, 2011		
Atomic Ninjas	Grip Digital	Unreleased	October 2, 2013	October 8, 2013	D	
Attack on Titan	Koei Tecmo Games	February 18, 2016	August 26, 2016	August 30, 2016		
Auditorium HD	Cipher Prime / Empty Clip Studios	Unreleased	Unreleased	November 23, 2010	D	
Avatar: The Game	Ubisoft Montreal	Unreleased	December 4, 2009	December 1, 2009	3D	
The Awakened Fate Ultimatum	Nippon Ichi Software	September 25, 2014	March 27, 2015	March 25, 2015		
Awesomenauts	Ronimo Games	Unreleased	May 2, 2012	May 1, 2012	D	
Babel Rising	Mondo Productions	Unreleased	June 13, 2012	June 12, 2012	D	
Back to Bed	Bedtime Digital Games	February 9, 2017	August 25, 2015	August 25, 2015	D	
Back to the Future: The Game	Telltale Games	Unreleased	May 4, 2012	October 25, 2011		
Backbreaker	NaturalMotion	Unreleased	June 25, 2010	June 1, 2010		
Backbreaker: Vengeance	NaturalMotion	Unreleased	August 24, 2011	Unreleased	D	
Backgammon Blitz	VooFoo Studios	Unreleased	January 29, 2014	April 15, 2014	D	
Badland: Game of the Year Edition	Frogmind	June 7, 2017	May 28, 2015	May 26, 2015	D	
Baja: Edge of Control	2XL Games	Unreleased	September 26, 2008	September 22, 2008		
Bakugan Battle Brawlers	Now Production	Unreleased	October 23, 2009	October 20, 2009		
Bakugan: Defenders of the Core	Now Production	Unreleased	October 29, 2010	October 26, 2010		
BandFuse: Rock Legends	Realta Entertainment Group	December 19, 2013	Unreleased	November 19, 2013		
Band Hero	Neversoft	Unreleased	November 6, 2009	November 3, 2009		
Bang!	SpinVector	Unreleased	October 16, 2015	Unreleased	D	
Bang Bang Racing	Digital Reality	Unreleased	June 13, 2012	June 5, 2012	D	
Barbie & Her Sisters: Puppy Rescue	Torus Games	Unreleased	November 20, 2015	December 17, 2015		
Barnanza	Straight Right	Unreleased	November 16, 2016	Unreleased	D	
Batman: Arkham Asylum	Rocksteady Studios	January 14, 2010	August 28, 2009	August 25, 2009		
Batman: Arkham City	Rocksteady Studios	November 23, 2011	October 21, 2011	October 18, 2011	3D	
Batman: Arkham Origins	WB Games Montréal	December 5, 2013	October 25, 2013	October 25, 2013		
Batman: Arkham Origins Blackgate – Deluxe Edition	Armature Studio	Unreleased	April 2, 2014	April 1, 2014		
Batman: The Telltale Series	Telltale Games	September 13, 2016	September 13, 2016	September 13, 2016		
Battle Fantasia	Arc System Works	May 29, 2008	March 6, 2009	December 22, 2009		
Battle of Tiles EX	Bimboosoft	January 24, 2013	October 9, 2013	October 8, 2013	D	
Battle Tanks	Gameloft	April 22, 2010	August 27, 2009	September 3, 2009	D	
Battle Trivia Knockout	Happy Dance Games	Unreleased	Unreleased	December 8, 2015	D	
Battle vs. Chess	Targem Games / Zuxxez Entertainment	Unreleased	May 11, 2011	Unreleased		
Battle: Los Angeles	Live Action Studios	Unreleased	April 20, 2011	March 22, 2011	D	
Battlefield 1943	EA DICE	July 16, 2009	July 9, 2009	July 9, 2009	D	
Battlefield 3	EA Digital Illusions CE	November 2, 2011	October 28, 2011	October 25, 2011		
Battlefield 4	EA Digital Illusions CE	October 31, 2013	November 1, 2013	October 29, 2013		
Battlefield Hardline	EA Digital Illusions CE	March 29, 2015	March 20, 2015	March 17, 2015		
Battlefield: Bad Company	EA Digital Illusions CE	August 28, 2008	June 27, 2008	June 23, 2008		
Battlefield: Bad Company 2	EA Digital Illusions CE	March 11, 2010	March 5, 2010	March 2, 2010		
Battle Princess of Arcadias	ApolloSoft	September 26, 2013	Unreleased	June 17, 2014		
Battleship	Double Helix Games	Unreleased	April 20, 2012	May 15, 2012		
Bayonetta	PlatinumGames	October 29, 2009	January 8, 2010	January 5, 2010		
Beat Hazard Ultra	Cold Beam Games	Unreleased	October 19, 2011	October 18, 2011	D	
Beat Sketcher	Japan Studio	October 21, 2010	Unreleased	December 1, 2010	M	
The Beatles: Rock Band	Harmonix Music Systems	Unreleased	September 9, 2009	September 9, 2009		
Beer Pong!	JV Games	Unreleased	Unreleased	October 22, 2013	D	
Beijing 2008	Eurocom	July 31, 2008	June 27, 2008	July 8, 2008		
Bejeweled 2	PopCap Games	Unreleased	May 14, 2009	January 29, 2009	D	
Bejeweled 3	PopCap Games	Unreleased	April 27, 2012	April 27, 2012		
Bellator: MMA Onslaught	Kung Fu Factory	Unreleased	Unreleased	July 3, 2012	D	
Ben 10: Galactic Racing	D3 Publisher	Unreleased	November 25, 2011	November 25, 2011		
Ben 10: Omniverse	D3 Publisher	Unreleased	November 13, 2012	November 13, 2012		
Ben 10: Omniverse 2	D3 Publisher	Unreleased	November 22, 2013	November 22, 2013		
Ben 10 Ultimate Alien: Cosmic Destruction	D3 Publisher	Unreleased	October 29, 2010	October 29, 2010		
Bentley's Hackpack	Sanzaru Games	Unreleased	February 6, 2013	February 5, 2013	D	
Beowulf: The Game	Ubisoft Shanghai	Unreleased	November 23, 2007	November 13, 2007		
Berserk Musou	Koei Tecmo	October 27, 2017	Unreleased	Unreleased	D	
Best of Arcade Games (Air Hockey, Brick Breaker, Bubble Buster, Tetraminos)	Bigben Interactive	Unreleased	January 21, 2015	January 20, 2015	D	
Best of Board Games (Chess, Mahjong, Solitaire)	Bigben Interactive	Unreleased	Unreleased	October 14, 2014	D	
Beyond Good & Evil HD	Ubisoft Shanghai	Unreleased	June 8, 2011	June 28, 2011	D	
Beyond the Future: Fix the Time Arrows	M2	October 12, 2011	Unreleased	Unreleased		
Beyond: Two Souls	Quantic Dream	October 17, 2013	October 11, 2013	October 8, 2013		
Bikkuri Pachinko: Ashita no Joe – Kyoraku Collection Vol.1	Kyoraku Sangyou Holdings	April 29, 2011	Unreleased	Unreleased		
Big Sky Infinity	Boss Baddie	Unreleased	December 12, 2012	December 11, 2012	D	
Bionic Commando	GRIN	June 25, 2009	May 22, 2009	May 19, 2009		
Bionic Commando Rearmed	GRIN	August 13, 2008	August 28, 2008	August 14, 2008	D	
Bionic Commando Rearmed 2	Fatshark	Unreleased	February 2, 2011	February 1, 2011	D	
Binary Domain	Sega	February 16, 2012	February 24, 2012	February 28, 2012		
BioShock	Irrational Games / 2K Marin	December 25, 2008	October 17, 2008	October 21, 2008		
BioShock 2	2K Marin / Digital Extremes / 2K Australia / 2K China / Arkane Studios	March 4, 2010	February 9, 2010	February 9, 2010		
BioShock Infinite	Irrational Games	March 26, 2013	March 26, 2013	March 26, 2013	M	
Birds of Steel	Gaijin Entertainment	March 8, 2012	March 16, 2012	March 13, 2012		
Bit.Trip Presents...Runner2: Future Legend of Rhythm Alien	Gaijin Games	Unreleased	August 21, 2013	March 5, 2013	D	
Black Knight Sword	Grasshopper Manufacture	January 10, 2013	Unreleased	December 11, 2012	D	
Blacklight: Tango Down	Zombie Studios	Unreleased	November 3, 2010	October 26, 2010	D	
BlackSite: Area 51	Midway Studios Austin	Unreleased	March 7, 2008	December 10, 2007		
Blade Arcus from Shining EX	Sega	November 26, 2015	Unreleased	Unreleased		
Blade Kitten	Krome Studios	Unreleased	September 22, 2010	September 20, 2010	D	
Blades of Time	Gaijin Entertainment	March 8, 2012	March 16, 2012	March 6, 2012		
Bladestorm: Nightmare (Note: update for Bladestorm: The Hundred Years' War.)	Koei Tecmo Games	January 29, 2015	April 15, 2015	March 17, 2015	D	
Bladestorm: The Hundred Years' War	Omega Force	August 30, 2007	November 2, 2007	November 6, 2007		
Blast Factor	Bluepoint Games	November 11, 2006	March 23, 2007	November 17, 2006	D	
BlazBlue: Calamity Trigger	Arc System Works	June 25, 2009	April 2, 2010	June 30, 2009		
BlazBlue: Central Fiction	Arc System Works	October 6, 2016	November 4, 2016	November 1, 2016		
BlazBlue: Continuum Shift	Arc System Works	July 1, 2010	December 3, 2010	July 27, 2010		
BlazBlue: Continuum Shift Extend (Note: update for BlazBlue: Continuum Shift.)	Arc System Works	December 17, 2011	February 22, 2012	February 14, 2012		
BlazBlue: Chrono Phantasma	Arc System Works	November 21, 2013	April 23, 2014	March 25, 2014		
BlazBlue: Chrono Phantasma Extend (Note: update for BlazBlue: Chrono Phantasma.)	Arc System Works	April 23, 2015	October 23, 2015	June 30, 2015		
BlazeRush	Targem Games	Unreleased	October 29, 2014	November 4, 2014	D	
Blazing Angels: Squadrons of WWII	Ubisoft Bucharest	July 5, 2007	March 23, 2007	December 12, 2006		
Blazing Angels 2: Secret Missions of WWII	Ubisoft Bucharest	March 19, 2008	November 23, 2007	November 6, 2007		
Bleach: Soul Resurrección	Japan Studio	June 23, 2011	September 16, 2011	August 2, 2011		
Blitz: The League II	Midway Games	Unreleased	October 24, 2008	October 13, 2008		
Blokus	Gameloft	January 12, 2011	December 22, 2010	December 21, 2010	D	
Blood Drive	Sidhe	Unreleased	November 19, 2010	November 2, 2010		
Blood Knights	Dtp entertainment	Unreleased	June 26, 2013	November 19, 2013		
Blood of the Werewolf	Scientifically Proven	Unreleased	Unreleased	October 28, 2014	D	
Bloodbath	Freedom Factory	Unreleased	May 2, 2014	Unreleased		
BloodRayne: Betrayal	WayForward Technologies	May 1, 2014	September 7, 2011	September 6, 2011	D	
Blue-Collar Astronaut	Mutated Software	Unreleased	Unreleased	March 14, 2017	D	
Blue Toad Murder Files	Relentless Software	Unreleased	December 17, 2009	March 25, 2010	D M	
Blur	Bizarre Creations	July 22, 2010	May 28, 2010	May 25, 2010		
Bodycount	Codemasters Studios Guildford	Unreleased	September 2, 2011	August 30, 2011		
My Summer Vacation 3	Millennium Kitchen	July 5, 2007	Unreleased	Unreleased		
Bolt	Avalanche Software	Unreleased	February 13, 2009	November 18, 2008		
Bomberman Ultra	Hudson Soft	June 18, 2009	September 17, 2009	June 11, 2009	D E	
The Book of Unwritten Tales 2	KING Art	Unreleased	September 18, 2015	September 18, 2015	D	
Borderlands	Gearbox Software	February 10, 2010	October 23, 2009	October 20, 2009		
Borderlands 2	Gearbox Software	October 25, 2012	September 21, 2012	September 18, 2012		
Borderlands: The Pre-Sequel!	2K Australia	October 29, 2014	October 17, 2014	October 14, 2014		
Bound by Flame	Spiders	Unreleased	May 9, 2014	May 9, 2014		
Braid	Hothead Games	September 9, 2010	December 17, 2009	November 12, 2009	D	
Brain Challenge	Gameloft	Unreleased	December 5, 2008	December 4, 2008		
Brave: The Video Game	Behaviour Interactive	Unreleased	July 27, 2012	June 19, 2012	M	
Brink	Splash Damage	July 14, 2011	May 13, 2011	May 10, 2011		
Brothers: A Tale of Two Sons	Starbreeze Studios	January 28, 2014	September 4, 2013	September 3, 2013	D	
Brothers in Arms: Hell's Highway	Gearbox Software	November 27, 2008	September 26, 2008	September 23, 2008		
Brunswick Pro Bowling	FarSight Studios	Unreleased	April 8, 2011	September 22, 2010	M	
Brütal Legend	Double Fine Productions	Unreleased	October 16, 2009	October 13, 2009		
Bulletstorm	People Can Fly	February 24, 2011	February 25, 2011	February 22, 2011		
BurgerTime World Tour	Frozen Codebase	Unreleased	March 28, 2012	November 15, 2011	D	
Burn Zombie Burn	Doublesix	Unreleased	March 26, 2009	March 26, 2009	D	
Burnout Crash!	Criterion Games	September 21, 2011	September 21, 2011	September 20, 2011	D	
Burnout Paradise	Criterion Games	February 21, 2008	January 25, 2008	January 22, 2008	E	
Buzz!: Brain of the World	Relentless Software	Unreleased	March 26, 2009	Unreleased		
Buzz! Junior: Dino Den	Cohort Studios	Unreleased	December 10, 2009	Unreleased	D	
Buzz! Junior: Jungle Party	Cohort Studios	Unreleased	August 28, 2008	March 12, 2009	D	
Buzz! Junior: Monster Rumble	Cohort Studios	Unreleased	September 3, 2009	October 15, 2009	D	
Buzz! Junior: Robo Jam	Cohort Studios	Unreleased	May 14, 2009	July 9, 2009	D	
Buzz!: Quiz Player	Relentless Software	Unreleased	Unreleased	December 21, 2010	D	
Buzz!: Quiz TV	Relentless Software	Unreleased	July 4, 2008	September 23, 2008	E	
Buzz!: Quiz World	Relentless Software	Unreleased	October 30, 2009	November 10, 2009	E	
Buzz!: The Ultimate Music Quiz	Relentless Software	Unreleased	August 22, 2010	Unreleased	M	
Cabela's Adventure Camp	Cauldron	Unreleased	Unreleased	November 1, 2011	M	
Cabela's African Adventures	Fun Labs	Unreleased	Unreleased	October 15, 2013		
Cabela's Big Game Hunter 2010	Cauldron HQ	Unreleased	Unreleased	September 29, 2009		
Cabela's Big Game Hunter 2012	Cauldron HQ	September 27, 2011	September 27, 2011	September 27, 2011	M	
Cabela's Big Game Hunter: Pro Hunts	Cauldron	Unreleased	Unreleased	March 25, 2014		
Cabela's Dangerous Hunts 2009	Sand Grain Studios	Unreleased	March 12, 2008	September 23, 2008		
Cabela's Dangerous Hunts 2011	Cauldron	Unreleased	Unreleased	May 6, 2011	M	
Cabela's Dangerous Hunts 2013	Cauldron	Unreleased	Unreleased	October 23, 2012		
Cabela's Hunting Expeditions	Fun Labs	Unreleased	Unreleased	August 23, 2012		
Cabela's North American Adventures	Fun Labs	Unreleased	Unreleased	September 14, 2010		
Cabela's Outdoor Adventures	Fun Labs	Unreleased	Unreleased	September 8, 2009		
Cabela's Survival: Shadows of Katmai	Fun Labs	Unreleased	Unreleased	November 1, 2011	M	
Caladrius Blaze	MOSS	August 28, 2014	Unreleased	Unreleased		
Call of Duty 3	Treyarch	June 14, 2007	March 23, 2007	November 17, 2006		
Call of Duty 4: Modern Warfare	Infinity Ward	December 27, 2007	November 2, 2007	November 5, 2007		
Call of Duty Classic	Infinity Ward	Unreleased	December 10, 2009	December 3, 2009	D	
Call of Duty: Modern Warfare 2	Infinity Ward	December 10, 2009	November 10, 2009	November 10, 2009		
Call of Duty: Modern Warfare 3	Infinity Ward, Sledgehammer Games	November 17, 2011	November 8, 2011	November 8, 2011		
Call of Duty: Advanced Warfare	Sledgehammer Games, High Moon Studios	November 4, 2014	November 4, 2014	November 4, 2014		
Call of Duty: Black Ops	Treyarch	November 18, 2010	November 9, 2010	November 9, 2010	3D	
Call of Duty: Black Ops II	Treyarch	November 12, 2012	November 12, 2012	November 12, 2012	3D	
Call of Duty: Black Ops III	Treyarch, Mercenary Technology	November 6, 2015	November 6, 2015	November 6, 2015		
Call of Duty: Ghosts	Infinity Ward	November 14, 2013	November 5, 2013	November 5, 2013		
Call of Duty: World at War	Treyarch	Unreleased	November 13, 2008	November 11, 2008		
Call of Juarez: Bound in Blood	Techland	July 23, 2009	July 3, 2009	June 30, 2009		
Call of Juarez: Gunslinger	Techland	July 10, 2013	May 22, 2013	May 21, 2013	D	
Call of Juarez: The Cartel	Techland	October 13, 2011	July 22, 2011	July 19, 2011		
Calling All Cars!	Incognito Entertainment	May 25, 2007	June 22, 2007	May 10, 2007	D	
Capcom Arcade Cabinet	Capcom	February 19, 2013	February 20, 2013	February 19, 2013	D	
Captain Morgane and the Golden Turtle	WizarBox	Unreleased	March 16, 2012	March 29, 2012		
Captain America: Super Soldier	Next Level Games / Sega	Unreleased	July 15, 2011	July 19, 2011	3D	
Carnival Island	Magic Pixel Games	Unreleased	October 18, 2011	October 18, 2011	M	
Carnivores: Dinosaur Hunter HD	Vogster Entertainment	Unreleased	December 18, 2013	September 10, 2013	D	
Cars 2: The Video Game	Avalanche Software	Unreleased	June 22, 2011	June 21, 2011	3D	
Cars 3: Driven to Win	Avalanche Software	July 20, 2017	July 14, 2017	July 13, 2017		
Cars Mater-National Championship	Incinerator Studios	Unreleased	November 30, 2007	October 29, 2007		
Cars Race-O-Rama	Incinerator Studios	Unreleased	October 30, 2009	October 12, 2009		
Cartoon Network: Punch Time Explosion XL	Papaya Studio	Unreleased	Unreleased	November 15, 2011		
Cash Guns Chaos	Sony Online Entertainment	Unreleased	Unreleased	November 17, 2006	D	
Castle Crashers	The Behemoth	November 25, 2010	November 3, 2010	August 31, 2010	D	
Castle of Illusion Starring Mickey Mouse	Sega	September 4, 2013	September 4, 2013	September 3, 2013	D	
Castle of Illusion starring Mickey Mouse (Genesis)	Sega	Unreleased	August 21, 2013	August 20, 2013	D	
CastleStorm	Zen Studios	March 11, 2015	November 6, 2013	November 5, 2013	D	
Castlevania: Harmony of Despair	Konami	March 29, 2012	October 12, 2011	September 27, 2011	D	
Castlevania: Lords of Shadow	MercurySteam / Kojima Productions	December 16, 2010	October 8, 2010	October 5, 2010		
Castlevania: Lords of Shadow 2	MercurySteam / Kojima Productions	Unreleased	February 28, 2014	February 25, 2014		
Castlevania: Lords of Shadow – Mirror of Fate HD	MercurySteam	December 4, 2013	October 30, 2013	October 29, 2013	D	
Catan	Game Republic	December 18, 2008	May 12, 2010	June 15, 2010	D	
Cel Damage HD	Finish Line Games	Unreleased	May 14, 2014	April 22, 2014	D	
CellFactor: Psychokinetic Wars	Immersion Games	Unreleased	May 28, 2009	June 4, 2009	D	
Catherine	Atlus Persona Team	February 17, 2011	February 10, 2012	July 26, 2011		
Chaos;Child	5pb.	June 25, 2015	Unreleased	Unreleased		
Chaos;Head – Love Chu*Chu!	5pb.	November 22, 2012	Unreleased	Unreleased		
Chaos;Head Noah	5pb.	November 22, 2012	Unreleased	Unreleased		
Chaos Code	FK Digital	April 3, 2013	March 26, 2014	September 3, 2013		
Chaotic: Shadow Warriors	Fun Labs	Unreleased	Unreleased	November 17, 2009		
Champion Jockey: G1 Jockey & Gallop Racer	Koei	September 22, 2012	September 2, 2012	November 8, 2012	M	
Championship Sprint	Sony Online Entertainment	Unreleased	June 29, 2007	May 31, 2007	D	
Chariot	Frima Studio	May 27, 2015	May 6, 2015	May 5, 2015	D	
Child of Eden	Q Entertainment	October 6, 2011	June 17, 2011	October 6, 2011	3D M	
Child of Light	Ubisoft Montreal	May 1, 2014	April 30, 2014	April 29, 2014	D	
Chime Super Deluxe	Zoë Mode	Unreleased	March 30, 2011	March 29, 2011	D	
Chivalry: Medieval Warfare	Torn Banner Studios	Unreleased	February 11, 2015	February 10, 2015	D	
Choplifter HD	InXile Entertainment	Unreleased	February 29, 2012	January 10, 2012	D	
Choujikuu Yousai Macross: Ai Oboete Imasu ka - Hybrid Pack	Bandai Namco Games	July 26, 2012	Unreleased	Unreleased		
Civilization Revolution	Firaxis Games	December 25, 2008	June 13, 2008	July 8, 2008		
Clannad (video game)	Prototype	April 21, 2011	Unreleased	Unreleased		
Clash of the Titans	Bandai Namco	May 28, 2010	May 28, 2010	May 28, 2010		
Class of Heroes 2G	Acquire	July 15, 2010	Unreleased	December 1, 2014		
Clive Barker's Jericho	MercurySteam	Unreleased	October 26, 2007	October 23, 2007		
Cloudy with a Chance of Meatballs	Ubisoft Shanghai	Unreleased	September 11, 2009	September 18, 2009		
Colin McRae: Dirt •DiRT^{NA}	Codemasters	Unreleased	September 14, 2007	September 11, 2007		
Colin McRae: Dirt 2 •DiRT 2^{NA}	Codemasters	November 5, 2009	September 11, 2009	September 8, 2009		
College Hoops 2K7	Visual Concepts	Unreleased	Unreleased	March 13, 2007		
College Hoops 2K8	Visual Concepts	Unreleased	Unreleased	November 19, 2007		
Closure	Eyebrow Interactive	Unreleased	Unreleased	March 27, 2012	D	
Cloudberry Kingdom	Pwnee Studios	March 26, 2014	July 31, 2013	July 30, 2013	D	
Combat Wings: The Great Battles of World War II	CI Games	February 14, 2013	Unreleased	Unreleased		
Comet Crash	Pelfast	November 25, 2010	October 8, 2009	April 2, 2009	D	
Comix Zone	Sega Technical Institute	August 31, 2011	August 17, 2011	August 23, 2011	D	
Command & Conquer: Red Alert 3	EA Los Angeles	Unreleased	March 27, 2009	March 23, 2009		
Conan	Nihilistic Software	December 6, 2007	September 28, 2007	October 23, 2007		
Condemned 2: Bloodshot	Monolith Productions	Unreleased	April 4, 2008	March 18, 2008		
Conflict: Denied Ops	Pivotal Games	September 11, 2008	February 8, 2008	February 13, 2008		
Constant C	International Games System	July 1, 2014	July 16, 2014	July 1, 2014	D	
Contrast	Compulsion Games	March 13, 2014	November 20, 2013	November 19, 2013	D	
Cosmophony	Moving Player	Unreleased	December 17, 2014	May 5, 2015	D	
Costume Quest	Double Fine Productions	Unreleased	October 20, 2010	October 19, 2010	D	
Costume Quest 2	Double Fine Productions	Unreleased	November 12, 2014	October 28, 2014	D	
Counter-Strike: Global Offensive	Valve Corporation	Unreleased	Unreleased	August 21, 2012	D M	
CounterSpy	Dynamighty	August 21, 2014	August 20, 2014	August 19, 2014	D	
Crash Commando	EPOS Game Studios	Unreleased	December 18, 2008	December 18, 2008	D	
Crash Time 4: The Syndicate	Synetic	Unreleased	February 28, 2011	February 28, 2011		
Crash Time 5	Synetic	Unreleased	September 28, 2012	Unreleased		
Crazy Machines Elements	FAKT Software	Unreleased	August 24, 2011	January 10, 2012	D	
Crazy Strike Bowling	Corecell Technology	Unreleased	September 4, 2013	August 21, 2012	D	
Crazy Taxi	Hitmaker	November 24, 2010	November 17, 2010	November 16, 2010	D	
Create	EA Bright Light	Unreleased	November 19, 2010	November 19, 2010	M	
Crescent Pale Mist	Rockin' Android	Unreleased	November 10, 2010	November 9, 2010	D	
Crimsonland	10tons	Unreleased	Unreleased	March 3, 2015	D	
Critter Crunch	Capybara Games	Unreleased	November 19, 2009	October 8, 2009	D	
Cross Channel: For All people	5pb.	June 26, 2014	Unreleased	Unreleased		
Cross Edge	Compile Heart	September 25, 2008	September 4, 2009	May 26, 2009		
Cryptract	Bank of Innovation	May 25, 2017	Unreleased	Unreleased	D	
Crysis	Crytek	October 18, 2011	October 5, 2011	October 4, 2011	D 3D	
Crysis 2	Crytek	April 1, 2011	March 25, 2011	March 22, 2011	3D	
Crysis 3	Crytek	March 7, 2013	February 21, 2013	February 19, 2013	3D	
Crystal Defenders	Square Enix	March 11, 2009	July 23, 2009	August 6, 2009	D	
The Cube	Funbox Media	Unreleased	November 16, 2012	Unreleased		
Cubixx HD	Laughing Jackal	Unreleased	August 17, 2011	September 20, 2011	D	
Cuboid	Creat Studios	Unreleased	February 5, 2009	January 8, 2009	D	
Cutthroats: Battle for Black Powder Cove	SCEA	Unreleased	Unreleased	March 28, 2012	D	
CSI: Fatal Conspiracy	Ubisoft Montreal	Unreleased	October 26, 2010	October 26, 2010		
CV Casting Voice	Bandai Namco Games	June 19, 2014	Unreleased	Unreleased		
Cyberbike 2	EKO Software	Unreleased	November 18, 2011	Unreleased		
