= SkyBox Labs =

Independent video game developer

SkyBox Labs Inc.
- Type: Subsidiary
- Industry: Video games
- Founded: 2011; 15 years ago
- Founder: Derek MacNeil; Shyang Kong; Steven Silvester
- Headquarters: Burnaby, British Columbia, Canada
- Key people: Shyang Kong (studio leadership, creative director); Derek MacNeil (studio leadership, executive producer); Steven Silvester (studio leadership, executive producer)
- Number of employees: 200+ (2021)
- Parent: NetEase (2023–present)
- Website: skyboxlabs.com

SkyBox Labs Inc. is a Canadian video game developer located in Burnaby, British Columbia. The company was founded in 2011 by former members of EA Vancouver, including Derek MacNeil, Shyang Kong, and Steven Silvester. They are mostly known for their work with Xbox Game Studios on the Halo, Age of Empires, and Minecraft franchises.

== History ==
=== Formation ===
SkyBox Labs co-founders, Derek MacNeil, Shyang Kong, and Steven Silvester, worked together at EA Vancouver from 2004 to 2010 on the FIFA, Need for Speed, NBA Live, and NHL franchises, where MacNeil was development director, while Kong was senior producer, and Silvester as technical director, when they decided to set up an independent studio in Burnaby, Vancouver.

Initially being a contract-based studio, in the year of its founding SkyBox Labs signed an agreement with publisher Microsoft Studios (late renamed to Xbox Game Studios), which liked the studio and its culture, being a partner publisher of SkyBox, although not owning them.

=== Development ===
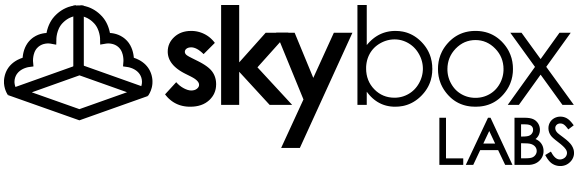
SkyBox Labs logo (2011–2021)

Midway through the development of the game, SkyBox Labs was contracted to produce some low-fidelity gameplay prototypes for Relentless Software's title, Kinect Nat Geo TV, which was developed for Xbox 360 with Kinect. None of the prototypes featured in the final product. It was published by Microsoft Studios and released on September 18, 2012. It received mostly positive reviews, scoring 78 out of 100 on review aggregator site Metacritic.

SkyBox Labs continued working with Microsoft Studios after that, co-developing an expansion pack for Age of Empires II HD called The Forgotten with Forgotten Empires, which was released on November 7, 2013. They also worked on a remaster of Age of Mythology called Age of Mythology: Extended Edition, which was released on May 8, 2014, and received mixed reviews, scoring 66 out of 100 on Metacritic, they also co-developed a new expansion for Age of Mythology: Extended Edition called Tale of the Dragon together with Forgotten Empires, which was released on January 28, 2016. They also developed a remaster of Rise of Nations, Rise of Nations Extended Edition, released on June 12, 2014.

On June 17, 2014, EA Sports UFC was a collaboration between EA Canada and SkyBox Games. It was the first UFC game after THQ lost the license and it was sold to Electronic Arts. Final product received mixed, but mostly positive reviews, with Xbox One version scoring 71 out of 100 on Metacritic and PlayStation 4 version scoring 69 out of 100.

Their next work was a simulation, sandbox video game called Project Spark, co-developed with Team Dakota and published by Microsoft Studios. It was released on October 8, 2014.

Japanese company DeNA published their next two video games, first being Military Masters for iOS and Android, which was released on December 4, 2014, and second being Protocol Zero for Samsung Gear VR, which was released on January 5, 2015.

SkyBox Labs then developed and self-published Parade Runner for iOS and Android, which was released on April 9, 2015. Company is also working on a PC game called Lethal Tactics, which was released in Early Access on Steam on May 20, 2015.

In 2018, after E3, SkyBox announced a new partnership with 343 Industries and Microsoft, where the studio will be co-developing Halo Infinite, the next major entry to the Halo franchise.

SkyBox Labs was acquired by NetEase Games in January 2023.

== Games ==
Release date	Title	Publisher	Genre(s)	Platform(s)	Additional note(s)
September 18, 2012	Kinect Nat Geo TV	Microsoft Studios	Interactive movie, simulation	Xbox 360 with Kinect	Contributed some simple prototypes to the game made by Relentless Software
November 5, 2013	Dragon Arena	SkyBox Labs	Fighting, strategy	iOS	Developed, published
November 7, 2013	Age of Empires II HD: The Forgotten	Microsoft Studios	Real-time strategy	Windows	Co-developed expansion pack with Forgotten Empires
May 8, 2014	Age of Mythology: Extended Edition	Microsoft Studios	Real-time strategy	Windows	Remastered
June 12, 2014	Rise of Nations Extended Edition	Microsoft Studios	Real-time strategy	Windows	Remastered
June 17, 2014	EA Sports UFC	Electronic Arts	Fighting, sports	Xbox One, PlayStation 4	Co-developed with EA Canada
October 8, 2014	Project Spark	Microsoft Studios	Simulation, sandbox	Xbox One, Windows	Co-developed with Team Dakota
December 4, 2014	Military Masters	DeNA	Turn-based tactics	iOS, Android	Developed
January 5, 2015	Protocol Zero	DeNA	First-person shooter, stealth	Gear VR	Developed
April 9, 2015	Parade Runner	SkyBox Labs	Endless runner	iOS, Android	Developed, published
August 24, 2015	Grandia II Anniversary Edition	GungHo Online Entertainment	Role-playing	Windows	Developed
November 5, 2015	Age of Empires II HD: The African Kingdoms	Microsoft Studios	Real-time strategy	Windows	Co-developed expansion pack with Forgotten Empires
January 28, 2016	Age of Mythology: Tale of the Dragon	Microsoft Studios	Real-time strategy	Windows	Co-developed expansion pack with Forgotten Empires
May 10, 2016	TASTEE: Lethal Tactics	SkyBox Labs	Turn-based tactics	Windows	Developed, published
September 8, 2016	Halo 5: Forge	Microsoft Studios		Windows	Developed
December 19, 2016	Age of Empires II HD: Rise of the Rajas	Microsoft Studios	Real-time strategy	Windows	Co-developed expansion pack with Forgotten Empires
June 21, 2018	Minecraft	Microsoft Studios	Sandbox, survival	Windows, Xbox One, Nintendo Switch, PlayStation 4, iOS, Android, Gear VR, Fire TV	Co-developed Bedrock Edition for Nintendo Switch and PlayStation 4, as well as major content updates: Update Aquatic, Village & Pillage, and Buzzy Bees.
October 11, 2019	Stela	SkyBox Labs	Platformer	Microsoft Windows, Apple Arcade, Xbox One, Nintendo Switch	Developed, published
December 8, 2021	Halo Infinite	Xbox Game Studios	First-person shooter	Xbox Series X/S, Xbox One, Windows	Co-developed with 343 Industries
