= Kinect Sesame Street TV =

2012 video game

- North American box art
- Developer: Soho Productions
- Publisher: Microsoft Studios
- Series: Sesame Street
- Platforms: Xbox 360, Microsoft Windows
- Release: Xbox 360: WW: September 18, 2012; Microsoft Windows: WW: November 28, 2013
- Genre: Edutainment
- Mode: Single-player video game

Kinect Sesame Street TV is an "interactive television experience" developed by Soho Productions and published by Microsoft Studios for the Xbox 360 video game system. It is based on the Sesame Street franchise and uses the Kinect peripheral to allow children to interact with episodes from the show. The game was later ported to Microsoft Windows under the name of Sesame Street Touch & Learn TV, which swaps out the Kinect motion controls for touch-based controls intended for Windows 8 and Windows 8.1 touch-screen devices.

== Gameplay ==
Kinect Sesame Street TV adapts episodes from the Sesame Street television series, combining them with segments especially designed for the game. Children can actively participate in tasks with the Sesame Street characters, like identifying letters or numbers through gestures and voice commands. The first season consists of eight 30-minute episodes that adapt content from the show's forty-second season. A second season with additional forty-second season show content was released digitally on the Xbox Live Marketplace on January 7, 2013.

The title was released either as a free downloadable "hub", with each episode available to purchase separately or as a physical release, which includes all eight episodes from the first season on two discs. In addition to the content already included, the hub also included a premium section containing an assortment of classic clips from the show, and every segment from Abby's Flying Fairy School and Bert and Ernie's Great Adventures.

== Development and release ==
In October 2011, Microsoft Studios signed a deal with Sesame Workshop to bring an interactive television experience to the Xbox 360's Kinect add-on, entitled Kinect Sesame Street TV. It was announced alongside its sister title, Kinect Nat Geo TV. The game was intended to get children moving and interacting with their favorite characters by using the Kinect's motion tracking and voice recognition, where the characters would react in a way if the child does a specific action displayed on the screen.

The game was released in North America on September 18, 2012. The game was released in the United Kingdom on the same day.
