= Buzz!: Brain of the World =

2009 video game

- Buzz!: Brain of the UK cover
- Developers: Relentless Software; Curve Studios (PSP)
- Publisher: Sony Computer Entertainment
- Series: Buzz!
- Platforms: PlayStation 3 PlayStation 2 PlayStation Portable
- Release: AU: 26 March 2009; EU: 27 March 2009
- Genre: Trivia
- Modes: Single-player, multiplayer

Buzz!: Brain of the World is a 2009 party video game developed by Relentless Software and published by Sony Computer Entertainment for the PlayStation 2, PlayStation 3 and PlayStation Portable. It is the eighth instalment in the Buzz! series of quiz video games and the last one released on PlayStation 2. The game has 21 regional variations with the game's title varying by region, but the basic concept behind the game remains the same.

The overall presentation and rounds in Buzz!: Brain of the UK are identical to Buzz: Quiz TV, except the questions are specifically about UK general knowledge, Music, TV, Film and Sport. The versions of the game for other countries follow the same pattern except for being slanted towards general knowledge with a connection to that specific country.

Buzz!: Brain of the World was available for the PlayStation 3, PlayStation 2 and PlayStation Portable, the first time that a single title in the Buzz! series has been available on multiple platforms. The PlayStation 3 version of the game featured online play and allowed access to user created questions on the now defunct My Buzz! site, as well as leaderboards. The PlayStation Portable version is developed by Curve Studios. Like the previous Buzz! game on that system Buzz!: Master Quiz, has a "pass-around" mode to enable up to 6 players to take part in the same quiz.

The PlayStation 2 version of the game follows the same format as previous Buzz! games for the platform, essentially being the same as the PlayStation 3 version but with lower resolution graphics and no online features.

== Versions ==
Game name (subtitle in English)	Region
Buzz!: Brain of the World	International / Ireland
Buzz!: Brain of the UK	United Kingdom
Buzz!: Le plus malin des Français (The Smartest Frenchman)	France
Buzz!: Deutschlands Superquiz (Germany Superquiz)	Germany
Buzz!: Brain of New Zealand	New Zealand
Buzz!: Brain of Oz	Australia
Buzz!: Il Quizzone Nazionale (The National Quiz)	Italy
Buzz!: ¿Qué sabes de tu país? (What Do You Know About Your Country?)	Spain
Buzz!: Brain of Switzerland	Switzerland
Buzz!: Le plus malin des Belges (The Smartest Belgian)	Belgium (French)
Buzz!: De strafste van België (Belgium's Finest)	Belgium (Dutch)
Buzz!: De slimste van Nederland (The Smartest in the Netherlands)	Netherlands
Buzz!: Mozak Hrvatske (The Brain of Croatia)	Croatia
Buzz!: Das große Länderquiz (The Big Country Quiz)	Austria
Buzz!: Quem é o Génio Português? (Who is the Portuguese Genius?)	Portugal
Buzz!: Suomen Neropatti (Finnish Geniuses)	Finland
Buzz!: Danske Genier (Danish Geniuses)	Denmark
Buzz!: Svenska Genier (Swedish Geniuses)	Sweden
Buzz!: Norgesmester (Norwegian Champion)	Norway
Buzz!: Сокровища нации (National Treasures)	Russia
Buzz!: Polskie Łamigłówki (Polish Puzzles)	Poland
