= The Trace (video game) =

2015 video game

- Developer: Relentless Software
- Artist: Gina Nelson
- Writer: David Varela
- Engine: Unity 3D with Metal
- Platform: iOS
- Release: 25 March 2015
- Genres: Puzzle, Hidden object, Crime-solving

The Trace (officially The Trace: Murder Mystery Game) is a 2015 dark immersive murder mystery adventure game developed by British developer Relentless Software. The whodunnit game, which sees the player assume the role of a detective out to solve a series of murder cases by examining the crime scenes, has been described as "part escape-the-room and part hidden-object, with a bit of puzzle-solving mixed in". The game was available for iOS devices

== Production ==
Prior to this game, the developers worked on the Blue Toad Murder Files series, which is thematically similar to the subject matter of this game. Relentless Software CEO Andrew Eades explained that while Blue Toad Murder Files was originally conceived as a PlayStation 3 DualShock game, it translated well to a touch pad interface. Becoming the No.1 app on iPad demonstrated to the company a market for puzzle adventure murder mystery games on these devices. The developers wanted to swap that game's cartoony family-targeted style for something more gritty, dramatic, and adult; therefore the franchise was split in two, becoming Murder Files: The Enigma Express and The Trace. Eades explained "The Trace's origins can be found in a prototype from 2010 called Blue Toad Crime Scenes". This "small" prototype was developed as a result of a series of discussions regarding how Relentless Software could further develop the Blue Toad franchise. Crime Scenes "experimented with ways to provide a more detailed crime exploration experience, where you'd take a much more hands-on approach to finding evidence". The game was not the basis of The Trace, but it provided the team with an opportunity to "create a really tactile investigation-based game" and see future potential in the genre.

In the game's official press release, Eades said the following:

After the success of Murder Files, we wanted to make a game that appealed to our biggest fans who love crime drama. We wanted to make it look great as well as have an intriguing mystery to solve and designed it as a mobile game from the outset. The Trace is a really stylish murder mystery that I hope pleases all our fans

— Relentless Software CEO Andrew Eades

== Design ==
The Trace described the formulation of the game's narrative: "Initially we worked out a story per scene but found it was challenging to connect them as a whole. In the end our writer David Varela wrote the whole story independently of scenes and gameplay. Then the best crime scenes within the story were picked out and recreated in the game." Many conversations were had between Varela and the game's producers regarding "just how dark we could go"; in particular two areas of contention were the state of Warren Oakley when the player finds him, and the injuries sustained by the dog Floyd. A "good balance" was achieved by the end of development. A web-of-leads mechanic was chosen after a design process which considered how various mechanics and interface would work visually and logistically. The aim was to make the player "feel like they were connecting clues and solving the case", so considerable effort was done to decide how to realise this without creating something too complex.

The lack of a hint system was chosen as the developers felt hints in games such as these were either too easy or too out-of-left field. They also considered using hints as a monetisation feature, but this was ultimately rejected. They reasoned that rather than try to craft hints based on specific "pain points" they identified, players can get the personalised help they need via social media. Eades stated, "It's a bit of an experiment, but it means we can engage with the players as they play." The designers also made a deliberate choice to leave the detective protagonist unvoiced, as narration would have jarringly removed the player from the gaming experience and would have prevented the player from projecting themselves into the role. The Trace uses Apple's Metal, and Gina Nelson designed much of the character concept art for the game. As of April 2015, the game is available in English, French, German and Spanish. David Varela, who "wrote the story and script, as well as a series of in-character blog posts published in the run-up to the game's launch" said that Pocket Gamer described the game as "The Room meets Phoenix Wright meets CSI", commenting that this is "pretty much what we were aiming for". He described the game as "huge fun to write" due to "haggling with the team over just how decapitated we can make that corpse".

The game's musical landscape began life as a series of musical sketches which were created by the sound designer during early pre-production. After the lead artist created an overarching style guide later in development, he was able to articulate a more detailed and specific design by "select[ing] around 15 tracks from various artists that he felt were a good fit". Eight external composers were sent these tracks, plus a music brief which described the "various moods, genres, and techniques he wanted to hear in the game". The development team reviewed the composer pitches, and subsequently hired the favoured entrant to score the whole game.

== Plot ==
The player assumes the role of Baltimore police detective Sam Pearce, who begins the game investigating a suicide which is later revealed to be a murder which leads to a series of chain events. Throughout the game, Pearce calls his lab partner Alex to discuss what is known so far, to follow up of potential leads, and to receive the results of tested DNA. Eventually, a kidnapping and extortion plot is revealed, and the detective unravels the truth behind the murders.

== Gameplay ==
This is a unique mechanic of The Trace that allows players to piece together the story behind the crime scene by testing hypotheses with their gathered clues.

The game "combines The Room-style screen poking, point and click puzzle solving, and hidden object hunting – and gives it a crime-solving twist." Players examine clue hotspots throughout the scene and collect useful items to unlock further rooms or clues. They can use a forensic flashlight to discover traces of blood on some and rotate them 360 degrees, similar to later games in the Ace Attorney franchise. As clues are discovered, the player pieces them together in a webbed flow-chart of lead questions which need to be answered to understand the full scenario. Each answered question results in a video demonstrating the events. Players move from screen to screen and can rotate 360 degrees, similar to Google Maps street view and the later games in the Myst series. Though dependent on one's "style of play and deductive ability", The Trace states a ballpark figure of 3 hours of gameplay on its FAQ.

The game lacks a hint system but allows player to tweet for help via the #SolveTheTrace hashtag if they get stuck, or post to social media like Facebook where they will likely receive a reply from Relentless. As this is a paid game, unlike free-to-play games in similar genres, players do not have to wait for energy or points to recharge and can advance directly through the three-chapter storyline. The game also does not have any fail-states, and features iCloud saving to allow players to continue on different devices. The game saves automatically as the player advances through the level. According to Pocket Gamer, the game should be played in the iPad. The Trace recommends that players should use an "iPad 2 and above & iPhone 4S and above, running iOS 7 and above", and said that while an iPhone 4 is acceptable it may result in performance issues. Relentless Software encourages players to experience the game by wearing headphones to take in the "captivating" music and sound.

== Release ==
The Twitter account was launched on 26 January, the game was officially announced on 26 February, and it previewed at the 2015 Game Developers Conference in early March. It was released on 26 March and will be released on Android's Google Play Store in the near future. To help publicise the game, The Trace offered two tickets to an Evening of Mystery and Murder event.

Gamezebo hoped the game would be the first in a series of instalments. The Trace tweeted on 2 April "To everyone asking for more. We're so pleased your enjoying the game! We'll definitely be looking at this if there's enough interest" - adding on their FAQ page "maybe new cases or even a full sequel". Eades stated "I always look to create something that can be a franchise. We still have plans for Season 2 of Murder Files, for example. With Sam and Alex, we'd like to see some DLC or even a sequel. That all depends on the success of the first one, though. We’ve certainly built The Trace engine with that in mind."

== Critical reception ==
The game has received a very positive reception, gaining a Metacritic score of 82% based on six critic reviews. Many liked the well-written logical murder-mystery plot, and have deemed it one of the few satisfying iOS games of the genre along with Detective Grimoire and the Sherlock Holmes PC series. Similarly, the engrossing and immersive nature of the game, which is played in a first-person perspective (by a character who realistically comments on clicked objects) was highly praised. This is aided by the game's soundtrack with a perfect balance of whimsy and dread, and its detailed realistic graphics. The ability to manipulate items (even those with no relevance to the case) and tilt the camera to further explore scenes have also been praised. Its mix of genres meant that critic felt players would like at least some aspects of the game. However, the game was criticised for not being long enough and being too expensive, for lacking in difficulty and re-playability, for having slightly imprecise/finicky/clunky controls, for not having Pierce and Alex voiced, and for being linear or streamlined.

The realistic, manipulable 3D environments were highly praised by critics.

The Guardian listed the game in both their articles 20 best iPhone and iPad apps and games this week (on 30 March 2015) and 20 best apps and games for April, describing it as a "proper murder-mystery detective game [that] sucks you in" despite being "quite short", and an engrossing "hard-boiled detective yarn...in interactive form" Mark Brown of Pocket Gamer declared it "The best iOS game this week" on 27 March 2015, commenting that while it was not "massively complicated or particularly difficult", the game is very good at sucking the player into the action. A different Pocket Gamer article praised its ability to unpatronisingly "allow the player to untangl[e] the leads and establish...the connections" all on their own, rather than making them "the Watson to the protagonist's Sherlock", deeming the game "pleasant if not pulse-pounding". Sarah Jacobsson Purewal of MacWorld placed the game in her You Should Play feature, deeming it "an epic game of whodunit" – a "precisely planned-out mystery with a strong, well-written script" and a gritty realistic "extremely searchable" 3D environment. Recombu praised the game's "slick, professional presentation" and "beautifully rendered...detailed environments", though wished the developers had recorded dialogue for the text that appears onscreen when interacting with the environment. The Daily Express listed the game as one of the five best new iOS games in time for Easter, while Apple highlighted the game in its Editors Choice section in March. The Daily Herald said the "well-constructed, compelling app" required "a sharp eye" and "a willingness to think outside the box", adding that while "not violent or particularly realistic", the game may upset younger or sensitive players.

Touch Arcade liked that "there's no searching for the sake of searching", with each item and puzzle having a purpose and helping the player advance in a logical way, unlike The Room, and the games of Sierra and LucasArts. The site described the branching diagram players use to test hypotheses and make deductions as "a very nice device that forwards the game's narrative without breaking the immersion." The Independent said the game has a "twisted artistry", was worth its £4 price despite the short length, and is the best detective mystery game "you only have to click 'get' for". The Arts Desk described the game as a "one-man mashup of CSI and Columbo" with "simple, slightly silly" cases when compared to the "emotionally wrung-through gut punches" of True Detective and Heavy Rain, concluding "this is the emotionally light and intellectually undemanding videogame equivalent of a Murder She Wrote or Quincy case – and has a similarly clichéd and homely charm". Gamezebo described the serious, thoughtful atmosphere, and the detective's "sardonic sense of humor"; the site praised the game's "minimalist, mostly menu-less style", which turned everyday actions into immersive "fun gameplay mechanics". It concluded "the truly rewarding moments in The Trace are exploring its gorgeous, accessible world and feeling like you are a physical part of it". Apple'N'Apps described the game as "well thought out and crafted", while Multiplayer.it said it had a "well crafted system for exploring, investigating and manipulating the environment" which allows the player to experience a realistic and believable crime scene investigation. Trusted Reviews called it "a short, but nevertheless captivating take on the world of the lone detective, wrapping a compelling mystery around solid controls and a detailed environment On complaints regarding its price, Cayman Compass wrote, "I was surprised that some people complained about it being $4.99 for just the one mystery...a lot of work went into its design, and it costs less than a burger".
