= Buzz!: The Schools Quiz =

2008 video game

- Box art
- Developer: Relentless Software
- Publisher: Sony Computer Entertainment
- Series: Buzz!
- Platform: PlayStation 2
- Release: UK: 11 January 2008
- Genres: Party, Educational
- Modes: Single-player, multiplayer

Buzz!: The Schools Quiz is a 2008 party video game developed by Relentless Software and published by Sony Computer Entertainment for the PlayStation 2. Developed in association with the UK Government's Department for Education and Skills (DfES), it was released only in the United Kingdom. The game's 5,000 questions are based on the Key Stage 2 Curriculum that covers children between the ages of 7 and 11 years.

Although the game is published by Sony the development cost were covered by Relentless themselves and a Government grant from DfES to fund the initial prototype.

Sony is publishing it. But we've funded it ourselves to get it out there. We really wanted to do something positive and this was a great opportunity afforded to us by the government. We don't make a penny from the version in schools but we will make money from retail sales if it sells well.

— Andrew Eades (co-founder of Relentless Software)

== Rounds ==
- Fastest Finger - A traditional round of Buzz! games. Players press their coloured buttons as fast as they can and see if they can get the questions right.
- Pie Fight - A round which first appeared in Buzz! The Mega Quiz, when a player gets a question correct they choose who they want to throw a pie at but they have to be careful, they could throw it at themselves!
- Fact or Fiction - Another round that was also in Buzz! The Mega Quiz. The questions take the form of Buzz making a statement and players use the blue and orange buttons to say if the statement is fact or fiction.
- General Knowledge - New to Buzz! You select your subject and everyone answers a question on it.
- Top Rank - Players put the answers in the correct order as fast as they can!
- The Final Countdown - Players' points are turned into time and however long they take to answer a question, their chances of winning goes down. Last one standing wins the game.

== Voices ==
- Buzz - Jason Donovan
- Rose - Nicky Birch
- Questions - Sally Beaumont

== Reception ==
Probably because Buzz!: The Schools Quiz was seen more as an educational aid rather than a game per se, the game was not reviewed in any of the regular games magazines and websites although the newspaper reviews that it did receive were positive. The Sunday Times gave it top marks of 5 stars and said "The Schools Quiz is certainly no substitute for homework or proper revision, but it is a good way to reinforce what children have already learnt in class" The Guardian gave the game 4/5 and said "This game is a great way for both teachers and parents to make learning fun"

Despite the game being for use in UK schools only, it was criticised by US attorney Jack Thompson who was quoted in UK newspaper The Daily Telegraph as saying "Video games have hurt far more people than they have helped", "I don't see how they can be of any more benefit than normal teaching.".

Although in an email to UK video game website Eurogamer, Thompson stated that the quotes were "a total fabrication". Thompson continued "I was never interviewed about Buzz. I had never heard about it until I was quoted having allegedly said this about it,".
