= Kinect Fun Labs =

Application development hub (2011–2012)

- Developer: Good Science Studio
- Publisher: Microsoft Studios
- Platform: Xbox 360
- Release: June 6, 2011

Kinect Fun Labs is an application development hub that allows users to play, create and share their own Kinect experiences. As of July 2012, there were fifteen games in the Fun Labs range. The games were developed by Good Science Studio, Smoking Gun Interactive, Relentless Software, Wahoo Studios, Asobo Studio, and N-Space and published by Microsoft Game Studios for the Xbox 360.

== Gameplay ==
In Bobble Head, the player can put costumes on their friends and collect them as bobbleheads. In Avatar Kinect, the players' avatar can act and it tracks their mouth so their lips will move. Kinect also knows where the players' cheekbones are, their eyebrows, so they can make them go up and down.

== Released games ==
There are fifteen games in Kinect Fun Labs. In the given table, is displayed the title, developer(s) and release dates for each game.

Title	Developer	Release date
Kinect Me	Good Science Studio, Smoking Gun Interactive	June 6, 2011
Build a Buddy	Good Science Studio	June 6, 2011
Kinect Googly Eyes	Good Science Studio, Smoking Gun Interactive	June 6, 2011
Bobble Head	Good Science Studio	June 6, 2011
Avatar Kinect	Good Science Studio	July 25, 2011
Kinect Sparkler	Good Science Studio, Smoking Gun Interactive	July 28, 2011
Air Band	Relentless Software, Good Science Studio	August 22, 2011
Mutation Station	Relentless Software, Good Science Studio	September 26, 2011
Musical Feet	Smoking Gun Interactive	October 24, 2011
Battle Stuff	Smoking Gun Interactive	November 28, 2011
Junk Fu	Wahoo Studios	February 20, 2012
I Am Super!	Smoking Gun Interactive	March 26, 2012
Kinect Rush: Snapshot	Asobo Studio	April 6, 2012
5 Micro Lab Challenge	N-Space	July 2, 2012
Mars Rover Landing	Smoking Gun Interactive	July 16, 2012

== Reception ==
Reception

Aggregate score
Aggregator	Score
Metacritic	80/100

Review scores
Publication	Score
Eurogamer	3/10
GamePro	40/100

Kinect Fun Labs received "generally favorable" reviews according to review aggregator Metacritic.

Dan Whitehead on Eurogamer stated that "Mostly, it's disappointing that the technology on display feels so clumsy. It feels like a step backwards for Kinect, displaying its limitations more than its strengths - right when mainstream developers are starting to do interesting things with the device outside of the obvious motion control applications."

GamePro stated that "Kinect Fun Labs displays some creative ideas, asks its boss what they think is cool, and then it tries to decide where to go from there."
