= Stela (video game) =

- Developer: SkyBox Labs
- Publisher: SkyBox Labs
- Director: Shyang Kong
- Producers: Derek MacNeil; Steven Silvester
- Designer: Joel Stack
- Programmers: Christopher Tan; Ghafur Remtulla
- Artists: Bobby Ranvir Bath; David Ahn; John Yip
- Composer: Gordon McGladdery
- Engine: Unreal Engine 4
- Platforms: iOS; Xbox One; Microsoft Windows; Nintendo Switch
- Release: iOS, Xbox One; 17 October 2019; Microsoft Windows, Nintendo Switch; 13 March 2020
- Genres: Adventure, puzzle
- Mode: Single-player

Stela is a puzzle adventure-platform video game developed and published by SkyBox Labs. It was released on 17 October 2019 for iOS through Apple Arcade and Xbox One and for Microsoft Windows and Nintendo Switch on 13 March 2020. The game was delisted from Steam on 20 January 2023.

== Plot and gameplay ==
Stela revolves around a young woman that is witnessing the final days of a mysterious ancient world.

The environment can be manipulated in order to solve puzzles or go past dangerous creatures.

== Reception ==
Reception

Aggregate score
Aggregator	Score
Metacritic	iOS: 70/100; XONE: 73/100; PC: 68/100; NS: 63/100

Review scores
Publication	Score
Destructoid	6.5/10
Eurogamer	7.0/10
GameRevolution	3.5/5
IGN	7.5/10
Jeuxvideo.com	15/20
Nintendo Life	6/10
Nintendo World Report	5/10
TouchArcade	4.5/5

Stela received a mixed rating of 71 on Metacritic for Xbox One, a 5 rating on Gamereactor, and 4.5 rating on TouchArcade.
