= Buzz!: Quiz World =

2009 video game

- European cover art
- Developers: Relentless Software; Curve Studios (PSP)
- Publisher: Sony Computer Entertainment
- Series: Buzz!
- Platforms: PlayStation 3 PlayStation Portable
- Release: PlayStation 3: EU: 30 October 2009; AU: 5 November 2009; NA: 10 November 2009; PlayStation Portable: NA: 17 December 2009; EU: 18 December 2009; AU: 6 October 2010
- Genre: Party
- Modes: Single-player, multiplayer

Buzz!: Quiz World is a 2009 party video game developed by Relentless Software and published by Sony Computer Entertainment for the PlayStation 3 and PlayStation Portable. It is the ninth instalment in the Buzz! series. It allows users to use question packs purchased for previous Buzz! games as well as supporting user created content and online play. Unlike the previous instalments on the console, the PlayStation Portable version of Buzz: Quiz World, again developed by Curve Studios, supports DLC. As with all previous Buzz games, the game is available in a game-only version or in a bundle which includes 4 wireless Buzz! Buzzers and a USB dongle for wireless connectivity (each dongle can connect up to 4 buzzers to the PlayStation 3).

Quiz World features a mix of old and new round types. For example, one new round hides the answers and then slowly reveals them.

A new feature in Quiz World is player profiling and the host Buzz addressing the player by name, informing them of their abilities and record as a player.

Buzz!: Quiz World also supported PlayStation Home rewards that are rewarded by winning the prize after a round of Buzz!: Quiz World. It supported full game launching for PlayStation Home as well, until its closure in 2015.

In March 2010, Sony and Relentless released a patch for Buzz!: Quiz World that added a feature to allow players to post to Facebook from within the game. According to the companies involved, this made the game the first in the world to offer such functionality. The patched Facebook features allow players to post details of the game session just played, including the in-game names of those who took part, and who won.

== Round Types ==
Point Builder - Points are earned for each correct answer. It doesn't matter how long one takes to answer, so long as it is within the given time limit. In Multiplayer, this is always the first round.

Fastest Finger - Similar to Point Builder, but players are awarded different amounts of points based upon who was the fastest to give the correct answer. The first player to answer correctly receives 400 points, then lesser amounts are awarded to each other player who also gets it right.

Stop the Clock - Similar to Fastest Finger, but the amount of points earned is based upon how quickly each player gave an answer. The less time taken to answer, provided that the answer is correct, the more points are awarded to the player.

Pie Fight! - Buzz stands in front of the players holding a cream pie. The answer choices to each question slowly appear, letter by letter. If the player answers incorrectly, they're out until the next question. The first player to answer the question correctly gains control of the pie. Every player is sequentially targeted by a cross-hair and the pie is thrown at the highlighted player when the player controlling the pie buzzes, causing the targeted player to lose a life. Each player can be hit twice before they're out of the round. Points are awarded based on how long players were able to survive.

On the Spot - One player is chosen to answer an upcoming question. After being shown a vague subject for the question, each other player votes on whether they think the currently active player, i.e. the one who gets to answer, will get the answer right. That player then receives a stake worth points depending on how the other players thought they would. The less favorable the opinion, the more points are added at stake. The player must then answer the question and if they're right, they get points equal to the stake, otherwise they lose those points.

Over the Edge - A vat of green goo is revealed below the floor. The answer choices to each question slowly appear, letter by letter. The correct answer is revealed as soon as a player gives an answer. If the first player to answer the question answers correctly, each other player's podium rises one level. However, if the first player to answer gets it wrong, their podium rises one level. Once a player reaches the fifth level, they are flung into the slime and out of the round. Points are awarded based on how long players were able to survive.

Short Fuse (also known as Pass the Bomb) - A bomb with a lit fuse of unknown length is thrown to a player. That player must answer a question correctly and fast to throw it to the next player. An incorrect answer will force them to keep it, wasting time. The player holding the bomb when it explodes loses points. The bomb also explodes immediately after three consecutive incorrect answers from the same player.

Boiling Point - In this round, each player must answer questions to raise a thermometer behind them. Each correct answer raises the thermometer one point higher and earns players points at the end of the round. The round ends when a player has correctly answered six questions, earning them bonus points.

High Stakes - The players are shown a vague subject for an upcoming question. Each player then bets an amount of points on that question. If they answer correctly, they win points equal to the amount they wagered, otherwise those points are lost.

Point Stealer - In this round, the first player to answer the question correctly chooses an opponent to steal 300 points from. If the player answers incorrectly, they're out until the next question.

The Final Countdown - The final round of the game. Each player's points are converted into time by raising their podium off the ground depending on how many points they've scored. Every time a question is asked, the podiums start to lower towards the floor. The first player to answer correctly gets a podium raise boost while the other players who also get it right simply stop their podium. Each wrong answer drops the podium slightly. The podiums lower faster as the round progresses. Once a player hits the floor, they are eliminated. The last player standing is the winner of the game.

== Reception ==
The game was well-received critically, achieving a Metacritic score of 80 based on 33 reviews, and being described as 'hands-down the best party game experience of the year' by TotalPlayStation.com.
