= Buzz!: Master Quiz =

2008 video game

- European box art
- Developers: Relentless Software; Curve Studios
- Publisher: Sony Computer Entertainment
- Series: Buzz!
- Platform: PlayStation Portable
- Release: EU: 25 July 2008; AU: 31 July 2008; NA: 23 September 2008
- Genre: Party
- Modes: Single-player, multiplayer

Buzz!: Master Quiz is a 2008 party video game developed by Relentless Software and Curve Studios and published by Sony Computer Entertainment for the PlayStation Portable. It is the first game in the Buzz! series to be made for a handheld console as well as the first game to be developed by Curve Studios as a primary developer.

The game includes both familiar round types and rounds that are new to the Buzz! series. The game's multi-player option operates in three different modes: multiple consoles and multiple copies of the game, multiple consoles and one copy of the game or Pass Around mode for use with one console and one copy of the game. Pass Around allows multiple players to pass the console between themselves and to target certain players. There are five rounds in a game of Pass Around with 2 players but with more there are six although that number can be lowered.

== Pass Around Mode ==
Picture This – The first round in Pass Around mode involves one player selecting one of four portions of an image which another player has to use to identify the whole image.

Rollover – The next round features a lottery machine like device that starts with a jackpot prize pool of 200 points. The jackpot increases by 200 points for every wrong answer until one player answers correctly and wins the points that have accumulated in the prize pool.

Short Fuse – After this round comes the Pass the Bomb. A fictional bomb with a burning fuse is given to one player at random, if that player answers a question correctly the "bomb" is passed to another player who must again answer a question correctly to pass the bomb. If a player takes too long to answer a question or fails to answer correctly before the bomb's fuse burns through, the bomb will explode taking 500 of the players points with it.

Weak Spot – The next round allows a player to see a question and then choose which other player to give it to, if the question is answered by the chosen player that player gets 200 points if not the player who gave the question gets 200 points. In this round no player loses points.

Virus – Another of the rounds is called Virus. This round lets a player pass a "virus" to another player of their choice, the virus quickly starts taking points away that player if they do not answer the question in time.

Snapshot – In the last round when a player answers a question, along with winning points, the player gets to reveal one part of an image divided into 12 pieces. When the player randomly picks a piece of the image they can PLAY or PASS, if they PASS a question will go to the next player but if they choose to PLAY they are asked a question related to the whole image. If the question is incorrectly answered the player will be eliminated until the image is solved.

== Quiz Host Mode ==
Quiz Host mode is the second multiplayer mode in the game and can be played with up to 7 players, 6 answering questions and 1 being the "Host".

The mode is the same throughout with some exceptions with some questions showing pictures where the host shows everyone the console before carrying on or a question where the host thinks of something that the question asks and each person has to guess.

The host can deduct or add as many points as they want when each person answers.

== Single Player Challenge ==
Single Player Challenge is the only single player option of the game and consists of 15 different quiz challenges such as how many questions you can answer in 1,2 or 3 minutes or simply to answer 15 movie questions.

You complete each challenge by receiving enough points from each correct answer to get at least the bronze medal, if not the player fails.

Quickfire Challenge – One of the challenges is called Quickfire Challenge. It's similar to Fastest Finger, where you answer questions, the faster the answer, the more points won.

Time Challenge – There is also the Time Challenge, a quiz of how many questions the player can answer in 1, 2 or 3 minutes time.

There are many trophy challenges to try to receive during each quiz such as answering a question under 0.50 seconds or answering 20 questions in a row.
