= Blood of the Werewolf =

2013 video game

- Developer: Scientifically Proven
- Publisher: Midnight City
- Platforms: Windows, PlayStation 3, Xbox 360
- Release: October 28, 2013
- Genres: Platform, Metroidvania
- Mode: Single-player

Blood of the Werewolf is a platform game developed and published by American indie studio Scientifically Proven for Microsoft Windows in 2013. An updated version was released for the PlayStation 3 and Xbox 360 in 2014.

== Plot ==
Selena, a powerful werewolf, has had her husband killed and her son kidnapped by monsters. The game revolves around her getting revenge on the monsters for this crime.

== Reception ==
Blood of the Werewolf received mostly mediocre review scores for the PC version but its reception was generally favorable in the case of the later Xbox 360 version. Cameron Woolsey of GameSpot gave it positive reviews and the scores of 7/10 for the PC original and 8/10 for the improved XBLA release, calling it "a wildly entertaining 2D action platformer, as beautiful as it was punishing." According to Joshua Vanderwall of The Escapist, "With a dash of Ghouls 'n Ghosts, a sprinkle of Mega Man, a pinch of Metroid, and a garnish of your favorite schlock horror tropes, Blood of the Werewolf is a brilliantly constructed homage to classic platforming."
