= Buzz!: The Ultimate Music Quiz =

2010 video game

- Box art
- Developers: Relentless Software; Curve Studios (PSP)
- Publisher: Sony Computer Entertainment
- Series: Buzz!
- Platforms: PlayStation 3 PlayStation Portable
- Release: PlayStation 3: EU: 22 October 2010; PlayStation Portable: EU: 14 January 2011
- Genre: Party
- Modes: Single-player, multiplayer

Buzz!: The Ultimate Music Quiz is a 2010 party video game developed by Relentless Software and published by Sony Computer Entertainment for the PlayStation 3. A port to PlayStation Portable developed by Curve Studios was released in 2011. The final instalment of the Buzz! game series, it was only released in Europe.

== Gameplay ==
The Ultimate Music Quiz is the only Buzz! game to feature support for PlayStation Move. The move section of the game allows users to take part in a different style of quiz where they use the Move controller to select the correct answer. During this section the player is shown on screen and the Move controller is shown as a giant dart or a hammer or other object which the user uses to pop balloons or break block that represent the correct answer.

Four players can participate at a time, with a choice of game lengths or specific rounds to be played. There is a new mini-game named Twisted Tunes. It makes slight changes to each song given, with a goal to guess them as fast as possible.

The game also includes a feature called Paperface where players with a PlayStation Eye camera can use it to add their own faces, for use on the in-game characters.
