= Battle: Los Angeles (video game) =

2011 video game

- Developer: Saber Interactive
- Publisher: Konami
- Platforms: Windows, Xbox 360, PlayStation 3
- Release: Windows, Xbox 360; March 11, 2011; PlayStation 3: NA: March 22, 2011; PAL: February 17, 2016
- Genre: First-person shooter
- Mode: Single-player

Battle: Los Angeles is a 2011 first-person shooter video game developed by Saber Interactive and published by Konami for Microsoft Windows (via Steam), PlayStation 3 (via PlayStation Network), and Xbox 360 (via Xbox Live Arcade). It was based on the 2011 film of the same name.

== Reception ==
Reception

Aggregate score
Aggregator	Score		
Aggregator	PC	PS3	Xbox 360
Metacritic	38/100	43/100	39/100

Review scores
Publication	Score		
Publication	PC	PS3	Xbox 360
4Players	N/A	N/A	40%
Eurogamer	4/10	N/A	4/10
Gamekult	2/10	N/A	N/A
GamesMaster	N/A	N/A	20%
GameSpot	N/A	N/A	3/10
IGN	5.5/10	5.5/10	5.5/10
MeriStation	4.5/10	N/A	N/A
PlayStation Official Magazine – UK	N/A	3/10	N/A
Official Xbox Magazine (US)	N/A	N/A	5/10
PC Gamer (UK)	30%	N/A	N/A

The game received "unfavorable" reviews on all platforms, according to the review aggregation website Metacritic.

Since its release, the Xbox 360 version sold 60,076 units worldwide by the end of 2011.
