= BandFuse: Rock Legends =

2013 video game

- Developer: Realta Entertainment Group
- Publishers: NA: Mastiff; JP: Hamster Corporation
- Director: Jon Heiner
- Producer: Matteo Marsala
- Programmer: Mark Ribau
- Artist: Kevin Brown
- Platforms: Xbox 360; PlayStation 3
- Release: NA: November 19, 2013; JP: December 19, 2013
- Genre: Music video game
- Modes: Single-player, multiplayer

BandFuse: Rock Legends is a music video game produced by the American studio Realta Entertainment Group. It integrates musical instruments with video game consoles through a proprietary audio engine also developed by Realta. This audio engine supports up to 4 players, and connects to PlayStation 3 and Xbox 360 consoles using electric guitars, basses, and microphones.

== Overview ==
In addition to the proprietary audio engine, BandFuse: Rock Legends also integrates an animated version of Guitar and Bass tablature. The game also features a scored vocal highway design licensed by strategic partner Harmonix Music Systems, as well as a Karaoke Mode. BandFuse includes a multiplayer mode for up to four players.

The game was released on the PlayStation 3 and Xbox 360 platforms on November 19, 2013 in North America, and on November 26 in Latin America. It was released in Japan on the PlayStation 3 and Xbox 360 on December 19, 2013.

== Gameplay ==
BandFuse is bundled with a SpeedFuse instrument cable that connects a standard electric guitar or bass' 1/4 in (6.4 mm) output jack to a USB port on video game consoles. Acoustic guitars can be connected to the game with the optional AcoustiLink adapter. The game also supports two types of gameplay for vocals using the optional MicFuse USB microphone (Rock Band and Guitar Hero video game microphones are also compatible). The game works with all standard electric guitars and basses. BandFuse was also sold as the Artist Pack, bundled with a Fender Squier Bullet electric guitar.

BandFuse gameplay utilizes guitar and bass tablature, which is animated and tracked through the game's own audio engine. Additionally, vocalists can play without being scored in "Karaoke Mode" or compete against stringed instruments using a vocal highway design pioneered by Harmonix. Players can find traditional gameplay in "Tour" mode, where they embark on a musical career and progress through a series of band tours consisting of evolving setlists, musical challenges and festivals.

Accessible for multiple skill levels, the gameplay begins at a novice level appropriate for first-time players and eventually challenges players with note-for-note transcriptions of the original music. The gameplay interface also includes the original music videos for each song in the setlist.

While playing a song, the game scores the player on pitch and timing in real-time, which provides both scoring and visual feedback. A scoring multiplier is triggered with streaks of correctly played notes, increasing the scoring potential. Players of varying skill levels and even different instruments can play head-to-head, competing for the best overall pitch and timing accuracy percentage. When grouped together in simultaneous gameplay, players also receive a "Band" score in addition to individual instrument scores.

As players progress through gameplay, they unlock a series of achievements (Xbox 360) and trophies (PlayStation 3), and earn in-game currency that lets them "purchase" more prestigious and difficult tours.

== Amplifiers and pedals ==
The developers implemented 10 original amps and nine pedals into the game. The game offers complete control over all of the tone shaping tools in game, allowing the player to achieve the sound they prefer. Players can save presets, and recall their favorite tones for use on all content in the game and DLC.

== Soundtrack ==
As of the day of release, the full song list is available on BandFuse's website, with the exception of DLCs.

| Song | Artist(s) |
|---|---|
| "Move Along" | All American Rejects |
| "Infected" | Bad Religion |
| "Overlord" | Black Label Society |
| "No Rain" | Blind Melon |
| "All The Small Things" | Blink-182 |
| "Godzilla" | Blue Öyster Cult |
| "Song 2" | Blur |
| "Tears Don't Fall" | Bullet For My Valentine |
| "I Want You to Want Me" | Cheap Trick |
| "Are You Dead Yet" | Children of Bodom |
| "Should I Stay or Should I Go" | The Clash |
| "Yellow" | Coldplay |
| "Rock Bandit" | Bootsy Collins |
| "Drain the Blood" | The Distillers |
| "Pull Me Under" | Dream Theater |
| "Epic" | Faith No More |
| "Sugar, We're Goin' Down" | Fall Out Boy |
| "The Bleeding" | Five Finger Death Punch |
| "Hot Blooded" | Foreigner |
| "Hell In a Bucket" | Grateful Dead |
| "Love Bites (So Do I)" | Halestorm |
| "Barracuda" | Heart |
| "Rebel Yell" | Billy Idol |
| "Drive" | Incubus |
| "Been Caught Stealing" | Jane's Addiction |
| "Breaking the Law" | Judas Priest |
| "Carry On Wayward Son" | Kansas |
| "Cult of Personality" | Living Colour |
| "Wicked Sensation" | Lynch Mob |
| "Harder to Breathe" | Maroon 5 |
| "Hangar 18" | Megadeth |
| "I Melt With You" | Modern English |
| "Float On" | Modest Mouse |
| "You Oughta Know" | Alanis Morissette |
| "Welcome to the Black Parade" | My Chemical Romance |
| "Absolutely (Story of a Girl)" | Nine Days |
| "I'm Broken" | Pantera |
| "Alive" | Pearl Jam |
| "Here Comes Your Man" | Pixies |
| "Round and Round" | Ratt |
| "Wires" | Red Fang |
| "Limelight" | Rush |
| "Black Magic Woman" | Santana |
| "Rock This Town" | Brian Setzer |
| "Barely Breathing" | Duncan Sheik |
| "Blue on Black" | Kenny Wayne Shepherd |
| "Devour" | Shinedown |
| "Back from Cali" | Slash |
| "Bad Luck" | Social Distortion |
| "Jessie's Girl" | Rick Springfield |
| "The Crazy Ones" | Stellar Revival |
| "Reptilia" | The Strokes |
| "What I Got" | Sublime |
| "Souls of Black" | Testament |
| "Woman" | Wolfmother |

DLC

| Song | Artist(s) |
|---|---|
| "The Downfall of Us All" | A Day To Remember |
| "Run-Around" | Blues Traveler |
| "Foreplay/Long Time" | Boston |
| "Surrender" | Cheap Trick |
| "Inside the Fire" | Disturbed |
| "Dance, Dance" | Fall Out Boy |
| "Hey Man, Nice Shot" | Filter |
| "Crazy On You" | Heart |
| "Fire" | Jimi Hendrix |
| "Foxy Lady" | Jimi Hendrix |
| "Little Wing" | Jimi Hendrix |
| "Love or Confusion" | Jimi Hendrix |
| "Purple Haze" | Jimi Hendrix |
| "Pardon Me" | Incubus |
| "Mountain Song" | Jane's Addiction |
| "Simple Man" | Lynyrd Skynyrd |
| "All I Want" | The Offspring |
| "I Write Sins Not Tragedies" | Panic! at the Disco |
| "Cowboys from Hell" | Pantera |
| "Back on the Chain Gang" | The Pretenders |
| "Roundabout" | Yes |

== Legends ==
The game also features celebrity musicians, including Slash (Guns N' Roses, Velvet Revolver), Bootsy Collins (James Brown, Parliament-Funkadelic), Zakk Wylde (Ozzy Osbourne, Black Label Society), George Lynch (Dokken, Lynch Mob), Mike Ness (Social Distortion), Jason Hook and Zoltán Báthory (Five Finger Death Punch), and Alexi Laiho (Children of Bodom).

On November 25, 2013, Realta announced an exclusive partnership with the organization managing the legacy of Jimi Hendrix. The integration of Hendrix included 15 iconic Jimi Hendrix songs and videos through the game's downloadable content in 2014. Additionally, Jimi Hendrix joined the list of in-game Legends, and BandFuse: Rock Legends was the title sponsor of the "Experience Hendrix" 2014 tour.

== Musical instruction ==
The game provides multiple sources of musical instruction via the Legends themselves as well as interactive lessons and videos found in the game's Practice and Shred-U sections. The instructional videos demonstrate core and advanced playing techniques for guitar and bass, and an integrated vocal coach teaches the basics to singers.

Game Legends provide both insight and anecdotes to help aid and inspire aspiring musicians. They share their musical beginnings, trademark techniques, practice and warm-up techniques, suggestions for forming bands, tales "from the road" and much more.

The game's Practice section covers every song on the disc, as well as songs from DLC. Players can select from a list of song sections for each instrument, or practice the entire song. Learning enhancements include a selectable "click-track" to assist with timing, a looping function to automatically repeat sections or the entirety of songs, and speed control to slow down or speed-up playback of the practice song.

The Shred-U section of the game focuses on the difficult parts of songs using multiple tools to break down the song that will assist players. Starting with the most basic "note-for-note" versions of the songs, a virtual music teacher guides players to improvement. The game waits until the player plays the correct note before moving onto the next note in a song. Analytics measure pitch and timing, and will advance the player once they have achieved at least 80% accuracy for a particular section of a song. The player will start at 60% speed, and the analytics engine will increase it progressively as the pitch and timing are mastered. To be sure players have mastered the section, the game pushes them to play the part five times at 110% speed, measuring the accuracy of their pitch and timing throughout.

The backing tracks section includes instruction and practice for scales and modes; this feature guides players to expand styles and techniques.

== Hardware options ==
There are several pieces of hardware that are supported in "BandFuse: Rock Legends".

=== SpeedFuse instrument cable ===
The BandFuse SpeedFuse cable is a 1/4 in (6.4 mm) to USB instrument cable used to connect electric guitars and basses to video game consoles while playing the BandFuse: Rock Legends video game.

=== AcoustiLink acoustic guitar adapter ===
The BandFuse AcoustiLink adapter allows players to connect acoustic guitars to consoles by attaching it to the headstock or soundport when combined with a SpeedFuse cable.

=== MicFuse USB microphone ===
The BandFuse MicFuse mic is a dynamic cardioid-pattern vocal mic with filters to reduce distortion and an on/off switch.

=== 4-port USB hub ===
The BandFuse QuadFuse is a 4 port USB hub that allows players to simultaneously connect up-to four instruments using only one USB input port.

=== AudioLink Xbox 360 ===
RCA Audio adapter allows users to connect directly from the Xbox 360 console to supported stereo systems via RCA connectors. It also includes an optical output jack and 3.5 or 1/8" headphone jack. This adapter allows users to run audio directly from their console to their home stereo system in order to eliminate the high latency that comes with running audio through an HDMI adapter to TV speakers.

=== Headphone extension cable ===
The Headphone Extension cable is a 1/8 in (3.2 mm) male-to-female extension cable with volume control. This cable allows players to stand further back from their console when playing the game with headphones on.

== Development ==
The concept for BandFuse: Rock Legends originated late in 2008. The goal was to provide the final step in the evolution of music gaming for people coming from a background of Guitar Hero and/or Rock Band. The developers of BandFuse: Rock Legends also intended the game to be fun and beneficial for seasoned musicians.

The first half of 2009 was then spent building and testing various user interfaces for game play.

== Reception ==
GameZone's David Sanchez gave the Xbox 360 version an 8/10, stating "With tips from the pros, the ability to break down songs and slow them down, bass and mic support, and all of the living room concert fun that the rhythm genre has become known for, BandFuse is a great way to rock."

IGN's Steve Butts rated it 8.2/10, but he calls the Shred U aspect of the game "awful", indicating musicians in the instructional videos can seem disinterested (an opinion also expressed by a reviewer at Destructoid ) and that the game's practice modes can be just as useful as watching an instructional video and do not take full advantage of the interactivity of the platform.
