= Kinect Nat Geo TV =

2012 video game

- Developers: Relentless Software, SkyBox Labs
- Publisher: Microsoft Studios
- Platform: Xbox 360
- Release: 18 September 2012

Kinect Nat Geo TV is an interactive television program for the Xbox 360 video game console. It was developed by Relentless Software and SkyBox Labs, and published by Microsoft Studios. It was released on 18 September 2012.

The game comprises eight 30-minute, Nat Geo TV programs that allow the user to interact in activities related to the contents of the TV program.
