= Blue Toad Murder Files =

- Game logo
- Developer: Relentless Software
- Publisher: Relentless Software
- Directors: David Amor, Andrew Eades (executive directors)
- Producer: Darren Tuckey (senior producer)
- Designers: Paul Woodbridge (design director), Ruben Farrus (Designer), Steve Grimley Taylor (Lead Sound Designer), Andy Black (Junior Sound Designer)
- Writer: Iain Lowson
- Platforms: PlayStation 3, Windows, iPhone
- Release: EU: 17 December 2009; NA: 25 March 2010; 24 November 2010 (Windows)
- Modes: Single player, Multiplayer

Blue Toad Murder Files (full title, Blue Toad Murder Files: The Mysteries of Little Riddle) is a murder mystery puzzle video game developed and published by the British video game developer Relentless Software. The game is episodic and the first instalment was released for the PlayStation 3 via the PlayStation Store in December 2009. The entire "season" of the game, Blue Toad Murder Files: The Mysteries of Little Riddle, includes six separate episodes. The Windows version was available to download from online games distribution sites as well as from the official website in November 2010. Support for PlayStation Move was added in December 2010 (update 2.0). An iOS version was released in April 2013.

== Gameplay ==
The game is for one to four players and leans towards TV murder mysteries such as Agatha Christie's Poirot, Midsomer Murders and Jonathan Creek with "witnesses, alibis [and] motives" rather than being a logic puzzle like Cluedo. The game sees the player investigate murders and interrogate residents in the country village of Little Riddle. Aspects of the game have been compared to the Professor Layton series of games, regarding its setting and puzzle solving game mechanic, but it differs from the Layton games in that the puzzles in Blue Toad are more closely linked to the game's storyline. At various points the game questions the player about their investigation and key plot points to check that they were paying attention. Actor Tom Dussek voiced all the 22 characters (+dog) in the game.

== Characters ==
At the beginning of the game, the player(s) choose(s) between these four characters (excluding Watson):

- Lambert Vanderbosh was one of the first members of the agency. He is 50-something years old and is keen, kind and caring. Vanderbosh has grey hair and a large moustache. He is dressed in a brown business suit with a red (white polka-dots) scarf tucked in.
- Miss Marjorie Maple looks like a helpless old lady, but is actually a well-seasoned detective. She is understanding, loyal, and respective to others in the agency. Maple, like Vanderbosh, has grey hair which she wears in a bun. She wears a purple twin-set and half-moon eyeglasses.
- Richard "Dick" Dickens is a credit to British schools everywhere and has a dazzling career ahead of him. He is tutored by the other agents and is very hardworking. Dickens has brown hair which is always neatly combed to one side of his head. He wears a green, sleeve-less sweater (over a lime green shirt) with puffy brown pants and also wears round glasses.
- Hannah Dakota is the newest addition to the Blue Toad team and received her invitation when she solved the Dilemma of the Discordant Debutant. She is smart and very attractive, too. Hannah is a blonde-headed detective and has side bangs which are tucked back. She wears a yellow sweater with a green tie and a green skirt. Like Dickens, she also wears round glasses.

== Episodes ==
=== Episode 1: Little Riddle's Deadly Dilemma ===
The Four Suspects (from Left to Right) The Miller, The Jeweller, The Doctor, and The Station Master.

The episode begins with the narrator explaining how the player is on vacation. Mother, the head of The Blue Toad Agency, is said to have sent the player to Little Riddle, a village described to be quite peaceful and comfortable. When the player arrives at the station via train, they see a member of the station staff (the Station Master) locked in a rather one-sided conversation with an old lady. The Station Master notices the player’s approach and seems to recognise the player from the newspaper, as a picture of the Blue Toad Agency members is on the front. The player then has to explain to the Station Master who is who by completing a puzzle. After finishing the puzzle, the player goes to the town hall, where the player meets the Mayor. Halfway through the conversation, the Mayor is shot and his body falls in front of the player. The player notices that the Mayor dropped a diary and picks it up. Soon, a constable arrives at the scene, shocked to see that the Mayor is dead. The player then plays a puzzle to decipher the diary, and learns that the Mayor had been in heated arguments with four people: The Doctor, The Jeweller, The Miller, and The Station Master. After this, the player visits the suspects (the order of which may vary); from the Doctor, it is learned that the chemist misread his prescription, which is why the Mayor was given the wrong pills; from the Jeweller, it is learned (after calculating how much the Mayor paid) that the Mayor still owed the Jeweller money; from the Miller, it is learned that the Mayor had forgotten his appointment with the Miller, in which the Miller had wanted to get his Mill repaired; and finally, from the Station Master, it is learned that he and the Mayor had argued about a tea room, but the Mayor had promised to look into the matter again. The player leaves to try to talk to the Town Hall Clerk, but finds Inspector Bragg, an officer who dislikes the player’s investigation, already questioning her. Tired, the player then checks into the Little Riddle Hotel (after completing a puzzle) before going to the pub. At the pub, the player helps the barmaid fix the pub's pipe problem, then chases down a shadowy figure who the player believes is spying on them. The figure is revealed to be the Constable, sent by Inspector Bragg to keep an eye on the player. In the morning, the player thinks that the old lady that was seen at the station might reveal more about the Mayor. The player learns from the Hotel Manager that her name is Mrs. Gossip. However, the player’s visit to Mrs. Gossip's cottage is of no help. When the player meets the Town Hall Clerk, she tells the player about each of the four suspect's conversations with the Mayor and also points out that the Miller had no appointment. At the end of the episode, it is revealed that the Miller was the Mayor's murderer. As the player and Inspector Bragg question him, he is shot before he can reveal his allies.

=== Episode 2: The Mystery of Riddle Manor ===
The episode begins with the narrator giving a brief review of the previous episode. The player is shown at the police station, listening to Inspector Bragg, who is blaming the player for the death of the Miller. Bragg says that if the player hadn't alerted the Miller's allies, they wouldn't have shot him. Soon, the Constable arrives, out of breath, and states that there has been a robbery at the Riddle Manor. Riddle Manor is said to have been owned by a woman named Lady Snobbish. The Inspector lets the player go, and the player heads to the Mill to see if they can find anything linked to the Miller's death. After finishing a puzzle, the player finds an old photograph under some sacks. The player then heads to Riddle Manor, where the Constable doesn't allow them to enter through the front, but gives hints that there is an entrance in the back. To do so, the player must go through the Manor's Maze (a puzzle). There, Lady Snobbish and Inspector Bragg are having tea on the veranda. Lady Snobbish tells the Inspector that two people visited her that day: The Vicar and The Colonel. Suspicious, the player pays visits to the two men; at the Vicar's church, the Vicar states that he saw nothing of the unusual at the Manor, but leads the player to Moses, the Vicar's groundskeeper; at Moses's shack, all Moses says is that he saw weeds at the manor; finally, at the pond, the Colonel runs off to see Lady Snobbish once the player tells him that the Manor was robbed. At the Police Station, Inspector Bragg seems quite happy to tell the player that he found the items stolen from the Manor. The Constable corrects him and says that someone else found them, but Bragg does not allow him to reveal who. Outside, though, the Constable tells the player (via hidden message) that the Butcher found the items. When the player arrives at the Butcher's, he describes the items that he found: a walking stick, a Chinese Puzzle Box, and an old writing box. Back at Little Riddle Hotel, the player looks at the photograph that they found and discovers that the young girl in it (along with a lady and a young boy) is Mrs. Gossip. The Hotel Manager then informs the player that a parcel has arrived for them and is at the Post Office. The player goes to the Post Office and retrieves a letter sent by Mother, opening it (and finding a newspaper clipping inside) in privacy at the pond. After doing so, the player heads to the Manor, where Lady Snobbish gives the same description of the missing items as the Butcher, with the exception of one item: an old Prometheus Statue with its hands down. Hopeful, the player visits Mrs. Gossip once again, but like before, the visit is pointless. At the end of the episode, it is revealed that Moses was the thief, as when the player visited him, the Prometheus Statue was on his night table. When Inspector Bragg questions him, Moses says that he can't reveal anything because a certain "someone" would want it that way.

=== Episode 3: The Mystery of the Concealing Flame ===
(From L-R) The Colonel, The Doctor, The Librarian, and The Jeweller.

Once again, the episode begins with the narrator giving a review of each event in the previous episodes. The Constable, Moses, Inspector Bragg, and the player are shown at the Police Station, with Bragg trying to get Moses to speak the truth. The Inspector soon notices that something outside is on fire. The smoke leads the player to the Town Hall. After extinguishing the fire, the player is informed by the Town Hall Clerk that the fire started in a cabinet in one of the archives. She also gives the player the names of the four visitors who visited the Town Hall that day: The Colonel, The Doctor, The Librarian, and The Jeweller. Upon return to the Little Riddle Hotel, the player learns that Watson—a smart dog and a loyal Blue Toad agent—has also arrived in Little Riddle. Determined to discover something, the player pays visits to the four suspects; at the Doctor's Surgery, it is learned that the Doctor was just researching at the archive, but before that, the player encounters Mrs. Bothersome, who is at first thought to be Mrs. Gossip but is later learned to be her twin sister; at the Library, the Librarian says that she was at the Town Hall to sort out the filing system; the Jeweller states that she was in the archives researching information about a pearl necklace; and the Colonel says that he was "doing a bit of reconnaissance". After hearing that something is happening at the Antique Shop, the player goes there. The cashier tells the player that someone (wearing a hat pulled down low) was trying to steal a Prometheus statue (one that bears a strong resemblance to the one Moses stole). The cashier also tells the player that there are three of these statues, but then Inspector Bragg arrives and asks the player to leave immediately. The player then visits the Town Hall, where the Town Hall Clerk says that Inspector Bragg has told her not to grant the player permission to look at the archives, but she also says that she is off-duty this evening. At Mrs. Bothersome's cottage, the player finds out that the Doctor is arranging assignations with the Librarian. In the Hotel, the player looks at the newspaper clipping received from Mother’s letter and notices the photo on the back; it is a portrait of Lady Snobbish's grandmother and grandfather, with the grandmother wearing a familiar pearl necklace and a Prometheus statue set on a table behind the couple. When the player visits Riddle Manor and asks Lady Snobbish if she sold the pearl necklace, she states that her father took it when he "left". Since it is now evening, the player sneaks into the archives, where they find an empty paraffin canister and an intact box of matches. After Watson sniffs the evidence, the player knows who used the two items and goes to the police. At the end of the episode, it is revealed that the Librarian was the one who set the fire in the archives. When the Constable and Bragg question the Librarian, she states that she did it for love, but says it wasn't for the Doctor. After her confession, she is hit by a car and dies.

=== Episode 4: Death From Above ===
After a brief review of previous events, the Librarian's (whose name is revealed to be Margaret Tess Madding) funeral begins. At the end, the Vicar asks the player to investigate on Moses's behalf, as the Vicar does not believe Moses would do such a heinous crime without a strong motive. As the player stands outside the Church's doors with the Vicar, the Colonel appears and says that he found something. Before he can say what, though, a block falls from the belfry and hits the Colonel, killing him. In the bell tower, the player finds Mrs. Gossip polishing the bells, saying that with Moses in jail, “someone needs to do the cleaning around here”. She also mentions that she thought she saw the Doctor (“a lovely man”, she says) in the belfry. When the player visits the Doctor, he says that Mrs. Gossip's mental state degenerates daily and says that Mrs. Gossip said that she saw him because "when she saw him at the funeral, she must have carried the image with her". At the Police Station, the Constable informs the player that Moses escaped, as someone knocked down the wall and took Moses with them. In the Colonel's house, there is a lot of information on Lady Snobbish; however, in the safe, the player finds notes on the secret research the counterfeit Colonel was conducting. Apparently, the Miller had been a Snobbish, and had a child. At the Church, the player finds out that the Vicar helped Moses escape, as Moses is in the Church. The Vicar says that "he" claims it is his son, but the Vicar fears a darker force. At Riddle Manor, the player shows Lady Snobbish the newspaper clipping that Mother sent the player. Lady Snobbish then says that the man in the portrait is her late husband's grandfather, and as she married into the family, she bears no resemblance. When she is asked if there are any other members of the Snobbish family, she heatedly says no. The player visits Mrs. Gossip and after looking at the photograph found under sacks at the Mill (in Episode 2), she recognises the woman in the picture as Mrs. Wentworth, the late wife of Moses, and the little boy as Charlie, her son. She mentions that Mrs. Wentworth was into the Miller for some time. At the Doctor's surgery, the Doctor conducts a test on the player before giving them pills to take before bed, saying that the player needs something to relieve the pressure on them. He says to come back tomorrow, but not in the morning, as he has an appointment with Lady Snobbish. At night, the player retires to their room in the Hotel, and after taking the pills the Doctor gave them, the player has a dream that leads them to fitting the pieces together in their mind. At the end of the episode, the player puts their suspicions on the Doctor, and thinks that the Doctor is going to murder Lady Snobbish too. When Bragg checks on the Doctor at Lady Snobbish's house, everything is fine. Frustrated, and thinking that he was made a fool of, the Inspector puts the player in prison.

== Reception and sales ==
Blue Toad Murder Files: The Mysteries of Little Riddle received moderately positive to mixed reviews.

Eurogamer awarded the game 8 out of 10 (all six episodes), commenting that "..the important elements, like the character, charm and challenge necessary to make episodic games worth sticking with, are all in place."

GameSpot UK reviewed the first three episodes of the season with a score of 6.5 (episodes 1–2) and 7.0 (episode 3) out of 10, commenting that "..with the right group of friends or family members, Blue Toad is definitely good for a few giggles. Just be prepared for a short and expensive ride."

IGN also reviewed the first three episodes of the season with a score of 4.5 out of 10, commenting that "..the execution of the entire affair is poor and even the occasionally clever puzzle fails to entice when the pacing and structure is so frustrating."

A review in Edge described the game as being "too irritating to satisfy as interactive fiction and too gentle to evoke competition". Edge awarded the game 4 out of 10 (first two episodes).

Blue Toad Murder Files: The Mysteries of Little Riddle has gathered over 250,000 paid PSN downloads as of April 2011.

=== iOS version ===
Pocket Gamer praised the game's atmosphere and pacing but raised issue with load times in some parts of the game. It scored the game as 7/10 and summed up by saying "There's not a huge amount of challenge, but Blue Toad Murder Files offers an entertaining holiday in a world that's not afraid to poke fun at itself, and you."
