= Relentless Software =

British video game developer

- Industry: Video games
- Founded: 2003
- Founder: David Amor; Andrew Eades
- Defunct: 2016
- Fate: Closed
- Headquarters: Brighton, East Sussex, England, United Kingdom
- Key people: Andrew Eades (chief executive officer); Bruce Heather (chief technical officer)
- Products: Buzz!
- Number of employees: 30-50
- Website: relentless.co.uk

Relentless Software was a British video game developer based in Brighton. Founded in 2003, the company was best known for developing most games in Sony's Buzz! series from 2005 to 2010. Relentless released its first self-published title, Blue Toad Murder Files on PC and PSN in 2009 and Quiz Climber Rivals, for iPhone in 2011. Relentless has also developed Air Band and Mutation Station, for the Kinect Fun Labs series. In 2012 it released Kinect Nat Geo TV, after which co-founder David Amor left the studio. In 2014 the studio released Murder Files: The Enigma Express on iOS, Google Play, Google Chrome and Kindle Fire. In 2016, the studio was shut down. The studio was working on an unannounced title for PlayStation 4 and Xbox One prior to its closure.

== History ==
Relentless Software was founded in 2003 by David Amor & Andrew Eades, who had previously worked together at the Brighton office of Computer Artworks.

Computer Artworks had been in the process of creating a DJ simulation game for Sony Computer Entertainment Europe (SCEE), but the company went into receivership in October 2003 before the title could be completed. Amor and Eades persuaded SCEE that they could set up a company and complete the DJ project for them. Much to their shock, SCEE agreed and Relentless was set up just 36 hours after their meeting with SCEE.

The company name arose from Amor & Eades ambition to develop video games in a different way to the perceived norms of the industry. They wanted development to be a steady flow of work rather than the more normal cycle of a slow start leading to a project ending with long "crunch" periods. They typed unstoppable into an online thesaurus and of the synonyms returned they chose Relentless as the company name.

Whilst Relentless were completing work on the DJ simulator - that had by now been named DJ: Decks & FX - they also carried out the conversion of an SCEE published title, EyeToy: Groove, for the Japanese market. DJ: Decks & FX was released in September 2004 and was nominated in the audio category of the 2004 BAFTA awards. More conversion work for SCEE followed, with the conversion of SingStar Popworld for the Swedish and Norwegian markets.

=== Buzz! (2004 - 2010) ===
In 2004 SCEE were approached by a company called SleepyDog who had secured the rights to a large number of music tracks and wanted Sony to use them as the basis of a quiz game. SCEE approached Relentless and asked them to design a quiz game using the music that Sleepydog had the rights for. Relentless ditched the idea Sony had presented them with, a board game on a screen, and instead developed the game along the lines of the player being in a TV studio, actually taking part in a TV quiz show. Buzz!: The Music Quiz was released in the run-up to Christmas 2005. Initially the game sold poorly, so poorly that Sony considered cancelling further titles in the series, but over Christmas sales dramatically picked up, so much so that Buzz!: The Music Quiz eventually sold over 1 million copies.

A sequel, Buzz! The Big Quiz quickly followed in March 2006 and its sales kept it in the PlayStation 2 UK top 20 for a whole year. In July 2006 Relentless and SCEE were joint winners of two Develop Industry awards. Winning Best New Intellectual Property for Buzz! and the Best Innovation category for the Buzz buzzers. Greater recognition arrived later in the year at the BAFTA Video Games awards, where Buzz! The Big Quiz, won the BAFTA award for Best Casual and Social Game.

Further Buzz! titles followed in 2007, along with an educational version of the series. Relentless had been trialling an educational version of Buzz! in schools and after a successful trial a full version - Buzz!: The Schools Quiz - was developed in association with the UK Government's Department for Education and Skills (DfES), with the game's 5,000 questions being based on the Key Stage 2 Curriculum that covers children between the ages of 7 and 11 years.

In total Relentless developed 13 titles in the Buzz! series which accumulated total sales of over 10 million.

=== Self-publishing (2009 - 2013) ===
In 2009 Relentless repositioned the company so that as well as developing for external publishers it would also publish its own titles as well. July 2009 saw Relentless announce their first self-published game, Blue Toad Murder Files. The episodic game was released for the PlayStation 3 via the PlayStation Store in December 2009. Along with the release of a PC version at a later date. The 1-4 player game leans towards TV murder mysteries with "witnesses, alibis [and] motives" rather than being a logic puzzle like Cluedo. As of July 2012, the game had sold over half a million copies, with the free episodes taking the downloaded total to 827,000.

Relentless returned to its quiz heritage with its next title, Quiz Climber, an iPhone game that was released in July 2011 and renamed and updated in December 2011 as Quiz Climber Rivals. It pits players against friends in a test of knowledge. Correctly answering as many consecutive questions as possible to climb the quiz tree, with questions growing in difficulty the further players progress.

The game was Relentless' first title following its restructuring to a digital release only, multi-platform developer.

In May 2011 Relentless announced a deal with PlayJam to create content for their TV based gaming network.

Relentless released two titles for Microsoft's Kinect Fun Labs series in 2011. Air Band (formally known as Music in Motion) is an augmented reality gadget that allows users to play virtual musical instruments. The second title Mutation Station is set in a mad scientist's lab and uses morphing of the Kinect video feed to transform players' appearances.

In 2012 Relentless announced Kinect Nat Geo TV which combines National Geographic wildlife films with interactive entertainment using Kinect.

=== Self-publishing (2013 - 2016) ===
After the release of Kinect Nat Geo TV, co-founder David Amor left the studio. In 2014, Relentless released Murder Files: The Enigma Express on iOS, Google Play, Google Chrome and Kindle Fire. The Trace for iOS and Google Play was also released.

== Company culture ==
Relentless was notable amongst video game developers in that it never had a crunch period during the development of its games. The company used to operate on a 9 to 5 basis with no overtime or weekend working.

== Games ==
Year	Title
2004	DJ Decks & FX
2005	Buzz!: The Music Quiz
2006	Buzz!: The Big Quiz
2007	Buzz!: The Mega Quiz
2007	Buzz!: The Hollywood Quiz
2008	Buzz!: The Schools Quiz
2008	Buzz!: The Pop Quiz
2008	Buzz!: Quiz TV
2008	Buzz!: Master Quiz
2008	Buzz!: Brain Bender
2009	Buzz!: Brain of...
2009	Buzz!: Quiz World
2009	Blue Toad Murder Files
2010	Buzz!: The Ultimate Music Quiz
2010	Buzz!: Quiz Player
2011	Quiz Climber Rivals
2011	Air Band
2011	Mutation Station
2012	Kinect Nat Geo TV
2013	Murder Files
2013	Furby BOOM!
2014	Murder Files: The Enigma Express
2015	The Trace

=== Awards ===
- 2006 BAFTA for Buzz!: The Big Quiz. Casual and Social Game category
- 2006 Develop Award in conjunction with SCEE in the category Best New Intellectual Property for Buzz!
- 2006 Develop Award in conjunction with SCEE in the category Best Innovation for Buzz buzzers

=== Nominations ===
- 2004 BAFTA Nomination in Audio category forDJ Decks & FX: House Edition
- 2007 Develop Award Nomination for Business Development
- 2007 Develop Award Nomination for Independent Developer
