= Buzz!: Quiz TV =

2008 video game

- European box art
- Developer: Relentless Software
- Publisher: Sony Computer Entertainment
- Producer: Dan Croucher
- Designer: Paul Woodbridge
- Composer: Paul Farrer
- Series: Buzz!
- Platform: PlayStation 3
- Release: AU: 3 July 2008; EU: 4 July 2008; NA: 23 September 2008
- Genre: Party
- Modes: Single-player, multiplayer

Buzz!: Quiz TV is a 2008 party video game developed by Relentless Software and published by Sony Computer Entertainment for the PlayStation 3. It is the seventh instalment in the Buzz! series and the first to not be released on the PlayStation 2.

It debuts new wireless Buzz! controllers, as well as new game rounds. It is the first Buzz! game to feature user-generated content and online play. Buzz! Quiz TV was one of the first games to support the PlayStation 3 trophy system, and the first online game to support the feature. The game is available in a game only (Solus) version or in a bundle which includes 4 of the new wireless Buzz! Buzzers, a USB dongle for wireless connectivity (each dongle can connect 4 buzzers to the PlayStation 2 or PlayStation 3).

An updated version of Quiz TV, titled Buzz!: Quiz TV - Special Edition, consisted of the already released updates plus some of the question packs that were available via the PlayStation Store. Buzz!: Quiz TV fully supported Game Launching in PlayStation Home from 10 September 2009 until its closure in 2015.

== Gameplay ==
There are nine modes in the game. A single-player game consists solely of three rounds of Stop The Clock, where the faster the player answers a question, the more points are awarded, provided that the answer is correct.

When playing a local multiplayer game with up to four players a game consists of seven rounds. These are:

- Point Builder - Each player is awarded 250 points for each correct answer; six questions are given, allowing for a maximum of 1500 points in the first round.
- Pass The Bomb or Short Fuse - One player is selected at random to be given the bomb and must then answer a question correctly to pass the bomb to the next player. The player holding the bomb when it explodes loses 300 points.
- Fastest Finger - The player who answers the question the fastest receives the most points and each subsequent player who answers correctly receives less points; in a 4-player game, the first correct answer is worth 400 points, the second is worth 300, then 200 and 100 if all 4 players answer correctly.
- Pie Fight - The first player to answer correctly gains control of a cream pie and must then press their buzzer as a target passes over the player they want the pie to hit. Each player can be hit twice, after which they will be knocked out of the round. The last player standing receives 1000 points in a 4-player game, 2nd gets 500, 3rd gets 250 and 4th (first player eliminated) gets nothing.
- Point Stealer - A series of pictures are displayed, and the first player to press their buzzer on the correct image selects another player to steal points from, taking 300 from the selected opponent's score and adding it to their own.
- High Stakes - A brief description of the topic the next question will be based on what is displayed on-screen. Players must then decide how many points they bet (50, 100, 250 or 500) that they will answer the question correctly.

The game ends with The Final Countdown. Here, each player is on a raised podium - the higher one's score going into this final round, the higher one's podium is at the start of the round. Once the round starts, as each question is asked, everyone's podiums start constantly moving towards the ground until an answer is selected. Once all have selected answers or run out of time, the correct answer is revealed. The fastest correct answer grants the player's podium a lift bonus, while incorrect answers cause the player's podium to drop slightly. Once a player's podium reaches the ground, that player is out. The winner is the last player left on their podium.

A multiplayer round of more than four players follows much the same structure, except the Pie Fight and Pass The Bomb rounds are not played.

Online multiplayer gameplay features the Stop The Clock and High Stakes rounds, in addition to All That Apply, where players may select as many answers as they like out of the four options. Players gain points for each correct answer given and lose points if they select an incorrect one or miss a correct one. The online servers were switched off in August 2013.

For user-generated content, players were able to create their own quizzes via a website called "MyBuzz!" David Amor, the creative director, in an interview with IGN stated that users would be able to freely create their own question packs which will be completely moderated by other users via user ratings, and a special "report content" button will flag inappropriate packs, as well as a parental guidance monitor to prevent free downloading by minors. Each user created question pack has eight questions, and individual packs can be linked consecutively.

Two updates were released. The first was released on 6 August 2008 and introduced compatibility with the PlayStation 3 Trophies system. It also allowed up to four controllers to be used in Sofa vs Sofa mode meaning multiple players on the same console could share a character and all answer questions in an online match. The second was released on 9 September 2008, with the addition of four new characters, new costumes for every existing character, ten new buzzer noises and support for the PlayStation Eye.

== Reception ==
Reception

Review scores
Publication	Score
Edge	7/10
Eurogamer	8/10
Game Informer	8.25/10
IGN (UK)	7.8
IGN (US)	8.9

IGN UK praised Quiz TV on its presentation and long lasting appeal but was unhappy with the lack of toughness in the games' questions, commenting that "most games descend into a question of fastest finger first". Despite their complaints they declared that Quiz TV' "is still one of the most wholesome and entertaining party games available."

Reviewing Quiz TV for Eurogamer, Dan Whitehead expressed initial disappointment that the game didn't feel bigger or bolder, like other games that have jumped from one console generation to another, but went on to say that due to the quality of the Buzz! franchise the game didn't really need a makeover anyway. Whitehead thought that the game was "more of a tentative step forward than a giant leap" stating that the game would "grow into something quite wonderful" with the aid of updates and user created MyBuzz content.
