= Colin McFarlane =

British actor, narrator and voice actor (born 1961)

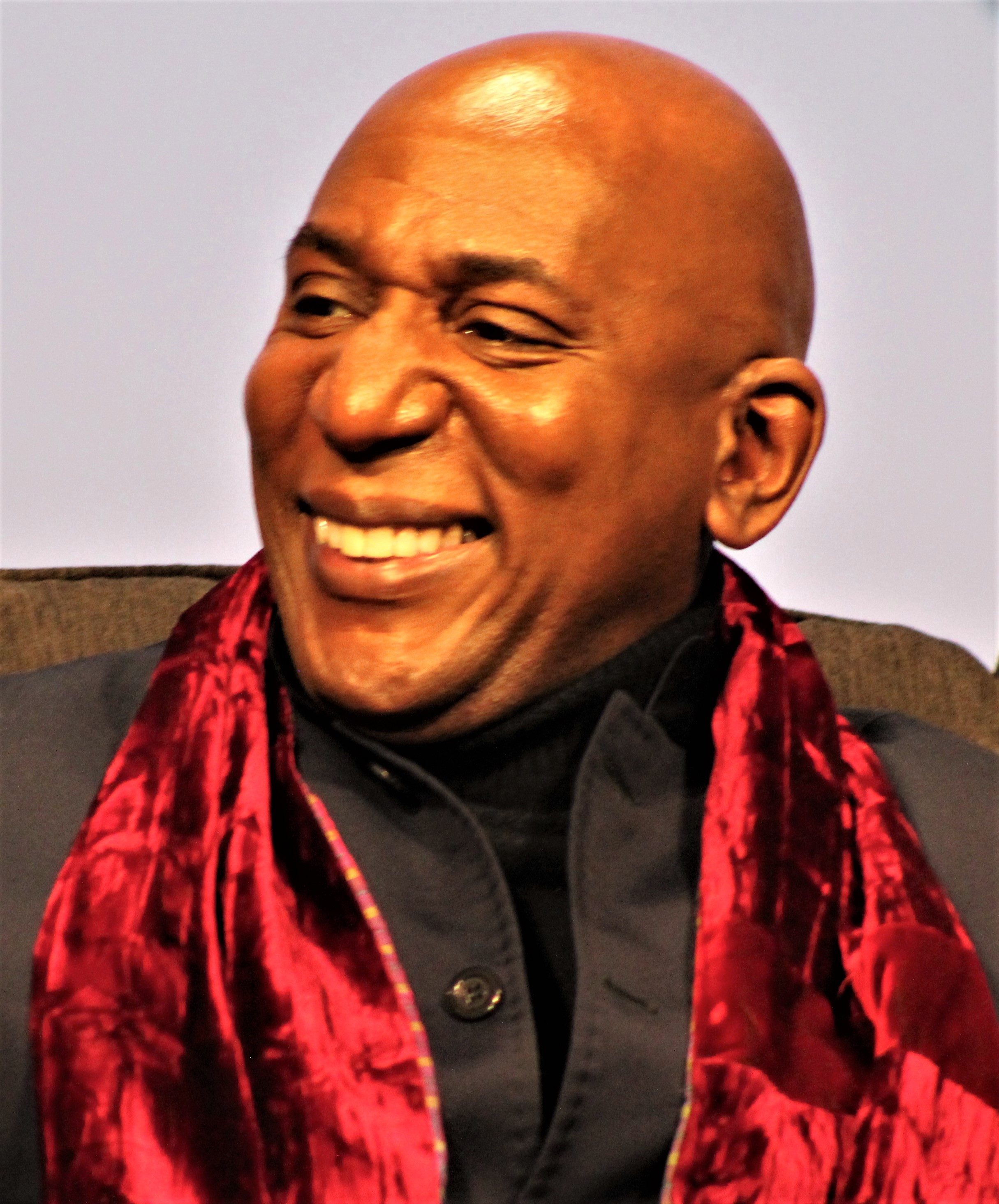
- McFarlane in 2019
- Born: Colin Andrew Ignatius Peter McFarlane; 15 September 1961 (age 65); Upper Clapton, London, England
- Education: The Perse School; Loughborough University
- Occupations: Actor, narrator, voice actor
- Years active: 1984–present
- Spouse: Kate McFarlane (m. 1991)
- Children: 3

Colin Andrew Ignatius Peter McFarlane (born 15 September 1961) is a British actor, narrator and voice actor. He is known for his roles in film and television, including in comedy sketch show The Fast Show, as Gillian B. Loeb in two films of Christopher Nolan's The Dark Knight Trilogy (2005–2008) and as Ulysses in the STARZ series Outlander (2018–2020). McFarlane's voice roles include JJ in Bob the Builder (2002–2005), Bulgy and Beresford in Thomas & Friends (2017–2020) and PC Malcolm Williams in Fireman Sam (2020–). He was the voice of The Cube (2009–2021) in the ITV game show, and is currently voicing Suds from Milo (2021–present).

== Early life ==
McFarlane was born on 15 September 1961 in Upper Clapton, London, to Jamaican parents. His father, Sidney McFarlane, served in the Royal Air Force (RAF) and his mother, Gwendolyn McFarlane, worked in the National Health Service (NHS). His father was appointed an MBE in 1999 for voluntary service to the community and for service with the Ministry of Defence. The family subsequently moved several times before settling in Lincoln in the East Midlands, where McFarlane grew up. He attended the Perse School, Cambridge, and later read drama at Loughborough University, graduating in 1983.

== Career ==
=== Television ===
McFarlane's first professional television role was in 1985 with a three-episode guest stint, as Detective Sergeant Watson, in ITV's hit police procedural Dempsey and Makepeace. From there, he went on to feature in London Weekend Television's made-for-TV film Dutch Girls (1985), alongside Colin Firth and fellow Outlander alumni Bill Paterson. The next year he featured in an episode of London Weekend Television's maternity mini-series To Have and To Hold, which focused on a surrogate mother carrying a child for her sister. In 1988, McFarlane guest starred in a season two episode of ITV's drama Bust, which followed a man in the wake of bankruptcy.

In 1992, McFarlane appeared in CITV's children's series Tales From the Poop Deck, where he portrayed Lieutenant Parkinson of HMS Intrepid, and he also made a guest appearance on several episodes of Channel 4's sitcom Sean's Show. Later that year, he featured in an episode of mystery series Virtual Murder, an episode of BBC's anthology series Screen One entitled Black and Blue, and the made-for-TV film Lenny Henry: In Dreams. In 1993, McFarlane guest starred in the children's series Runaway Bay and ITV's comedy Jeeves and Wooster, which focused on Hugh Laurie's Wooster and Stephen Fry's Jeeves. Two years later, he made guest appearances on ITV's Class Act and BBC's police procedural Backup.

McFarlane would go on, in 1996, to feature in an episode of BBC's Rowan Atkinson-led police comedy The Thin Blue Line, Channel 4's made-for-TV film The Final Passage, and the finale of ITV's four-part thriller series Circles of Deceit.

His numerous TV credits include Judge John Deed, Jonathan Creek, Casualty, Death in Paradise, Father Brown and Holby City. He has also appeared in two of the UK's most-watched soap operas. He appeared in five episodes of Coronation Street from August to September 2010 as a consultant neurosurgeon, Mr Jordan, and played DCI Irving in an episode of EastEnders in April 2014 as part of the "Who Killed Lucy Beale?" storyline.

McFarlane has also made regular appearances in British TV comedy, in The Fast Show, Randall & Hopkirk, Two Pints of Lager and a Packet of Crisps, Harry and Paul and The Thin Blue Line. He played Inspector Norris in the Black Books episode The Blackout, Inspector Terrence Brown in the first episode of Dirk Gently and voiced the Judge in the 2016 revival of the sitcom Porridge.

McFarlane also featured in the CBBC shows M.I. High and Hounded as the evil Dr Muhahahaha.

McFarlane has made numerous appearances in Doctor Who, voicing the Heavenly Host in the Christmas special "Voyage of the Damned" and playing Moran in the "Under the Lake" and "Before the Flood" episodes of the ninth series from 2015. In addition, he appeared in the third series of Doctor Who spinoff series Torchwood: Children of Earth, as the American military representative Colonel Pierce, a role he would reprise in the 2025 spinoff The War Between the Land and the Sea.

=== Film ===
McFarlane's first film was 1996's short film A Mulatto Song, which focused on the life of George Bridgetower, a virtuoso violinist from the late eighteenth and early nineteenth centuries. The next year saw him feature in the direct-to-film film I'd Like A Word With You, a corporate training video on how to deal with discipline interviews. He portrayed Police Commissioner Gillian B. Loeb in the critically acclaimed films Batman Begins (2005) and The Dark Knight (2008).

He appeared alongside Matt Smith and Natalie Dormer in the action horror film Patient Zero (2018). He then appeared as the governor in the 2019 thriller film Crawl, featuring Kaya Scodelario and Barry Pepper.

=== Voice acting ===
McFarlane's first voice role was in 1994 as Othello in S4C's Emmy Award-winning animated series Shakespeare: The Animated Tales, which adapted and condensed classic Shakespearean plays for children. The next year, he voiced the main villain in BBC's animated series Oscar's Orchestra, which explored a future in which music was banned. In 1996, McFarlane voiced two characters, God and Goliath, in the Emmy-winning animated series Testament: The Bible in Animation. From there, he went on to voice the recurring role of Sergeant Slipper, from 1996 to 1998, in the animated series Dennis and Gnasher.

McFarlane's best-known voice roles include JJ and Skip in the original series of Bob the Builder, and as the narrator on the ITV gameshow The Cube. He has also voiced Jonah in the 1997 animated series Captain Pugwash, Bulgy the Double Decker Bus and Beresford the Crane in Thomas & Friends and its 2017 feature film Journey Beyond Sodor. In addition, he played the part of Elvis the horse in Iconicles, Sparky the dragon in Mike the Knight, voiced several characters in the episode "The Sweater" of The Amazing World of Gumball, and as well as Police Constable Malcolm Williams in the twelfth series of Fireman Sam and its 2020 1-hour special, Norman Price and the Mystery in the Sky.

He played US General Trent Stone in the 2014 original audio drama Osiris by Everybodyelse Productions.

=== Video games ===
McFarlane has lent his voice to numerous video games, the earliest being 1996's Broken Sword: The Shadow of the Templars. He has voiced characters in G-Police, Codename: Tenka, and The City of Lost Children in 1997. He also voiced Greg in the Buzz! quiz game series, the character Avalon Centrifuge in the 2011 game LittleBigPlanet 2, and provided additional dialogue for Batman: Arkham Knight. He played "The Forgotten One", the central villain of the two downloadable content packs for Castlevania: Lords of Shadow, also lending his voice to Thunder, in the first Fable video game.

=== Theatre ===
In 2013, McFarlane appeared with Lenny Henry in a critically acclaimed revival of August Wilson's Fences at the Duchess Theatre in London's West End.

== Personal life ==
On 30 June 1991, McFarlane married his wife, Kate, with whom he has three children. He divides his time between homes in Lincoln and North London.

He is an avid supporter of Lincoln City F.C.

In June 2023, McFarlane announced that he had been diagnosed with prostate cancer.

== Filmography ==
=== Film ===
Year	Title	Role	Notes
1996	A Mulatto Song	Frederick DeAugust	Short film
1997	Countdown to Tomorrow	Narrator	Documentary film
1997	I'd Like a Word with You	George	Direct-to-video
1998	The First 9½ Weeks	Remy	
1999	The Criminal	Businessman	
2000	Sorted	Doctor	Credited as Colin McFarlan
2001	The Ultimate Stress Show: Managing Stress		
2001	Chunky Monkey	Trevor	
2001	Christmas Carol: The Movie	Mr. Fezziwig (voice)	
2002	War Game	Little General, King George (voice)	Short film
2002	The King's Beard	Jasper (voice)	
2005	Batman Begins	Commissioner Gillian B. Loeb	
2005	Fragile	Roy	
2006	Jungle Boogie	Makita (voice)	
2008	The Dark Knight	Commissioner Gillian B. Loeb	
2011	The Last Belle	The Barman (voice)	Short film
2013	Experiment K5-C	The Voice (voice)	Short film
2014	Shadows of a Stranger	Asmo	
2015	Slick Cars	Tiberius the Cabover Peterbilt (voice)	
2016	The 101-Year-Old Man Who Skipped Out on the Bill and Disappeared	Seth	
2017	The Invisible Guardian	Dupree	
2017	Peppa Pig: My First Cinema Experience	Mr. Lion (voice)	
2017	Thomas & Friends: Journey Beyond Sodor	Beresford (voice)	UK/US versions
2018	The Commuter	Conductor Sam	
2018	Patient Zero	Colonel Pierce	
2019	The Queen's Corgi	Chief (voice)	UK version
2019	Crawl	Governor	
2019	The Legacy of the Bones	Aloisius Dupree	Spanish title: Legado en los huesos
2020	Thomas and the Royal Engine	Bulgy and Beresford (voice)	UK/US versions
2020	Thomas & Friends: Marvellous Machinery	Dr. Holyfield (voice)	UK/US versions
2020	Offering to the Storm	Aloisius Dupree	Spanish title: Ofrenda a la Tormenta
2021	Jungle Cruise	Dromm	
2021	Supermind: The Brain Drain	Supermind	
2025	Grand Prix of Europe	Nachtkraab	Voice role

=== Television ===
Year	Title	Role	Notes
1985	Dempsey and Makepeace	Detective Sergeant Watson	3 episodes
1985	Dutch Girls	Mkwela	Television film
1986	To Have & To Hold	Teacher	1 episode
1988	Bust	Steve	1 episode
1992	Tales from the Poop Deck	Lieutenant Parkinson	Episode: "Here Be Pirates!"
1992	Sean's Show	Announcer	3 episodes
1992	Screen One: Black and Blue	Jesse Jarman	1 episode
1993	Runaway Bay	Henchman	1 episode
1993	Jeeves and Wooster	Toto	Episode: "Totleigh Towers (or, Trouble at Totleigh Towers)"
1994	Shakespeare: The Animated Tales	Othello (voice)	Episode: "Othello"
1995	Class Act	Newscaster	1 episode
1995	Backup	DCI Clews	Episode: "Clubbing"
1995–1996	Oscar's Orchestra	Thadius Vent, Tank (voice)	37 episodes
1996	The Thin Blue Line	European Commissioner Mustafa Delcroix	Episode: "Ism Ism Ism"
1996	Testament: The Bible in Animation	God, Goliath (voice)	2 episodes
1996	The Final Passage	Cast member	Television film
1996	Circles of Deceit: Kalon	Interrogator	1 episode
1996–1998	Dennis and Gnasher	Sergeant Slipper (voice)	26 episodes
1997	Countdown to Tomorrow Never Dies	Narrator	Television film
1998	The Adventures of Captain Pugwash	Jonah, Dook (voice)	26 episodes
1998	Kiss Me Kate (TV series)	Client	Episode: "Holidays"
2000	Black Books	Inspector Barry Norris	Episode: "Blackout"
2001	Office Gossip	Charles Mandelson	Episode: "Moving On"
2001	Oswald	Johnny Snowman (UK voice)	Episode: "The Go-Kart Race/Autumn Leaves"
2001	Randall & Hopkirk (Deceased)	Sebastian Snellgrove	Episode: "Marshall and Snellgrove"
2002–2005	Bob the Builder	JJ (UK/US voice) Skip (UK voice)	UK/US versions 16 episodes
2002–2005	Ginger's Egg-scellent Adventures	Pembroke (voice)	UK/US versions Recurring cast
2002–2006	Judge John Deed	Newman Mason Allen Q.C.	5 episodes
2002	Murder in Mind	Ray Marker	Episode: "Swan Song"
2002	Mysteries of Easter Island	Narrator	UK version Television film
2002	Babyfather	Consultant	Episode: "#2.3"
2003	Strange	Reverend Johnson	Episode: "Zoxim"; Television miniseries
2003	Yoko! Jakamoko! Toto!	Penguin	Episode: "The Snow"
2004	Jonathan Creek	Inspector Fell	Episode: "The Chequered Box"
2005	Beneath the Skin	Jeremy	Television film
2005	Holby City	Felix Kente	Episode: "Great Expectations"
2006–2012; 2019	Little Princess	Chef, Prime Minister, Horace, Various (voice)	25 episodes
2006	Hyperdrive	Male Bulaahg	Episode: "Asteroid"
2006	Two Pints of Lager and a Packet of Crisps	Brian	Episode: "Cauliflower"
2007	Doctor Who	Heavenly Host (voice)	Episode: "Voyage of the Damned"
2008–2015, 2020–2021	Chuggington	Harrison, the King of Buffertonia (voice)	30 episodes UK/US versions
2008–2015, 2020–2021	The Cube	Narrator	86 episodes
2009	Torchwood: Children of Earth	General Austin Pierce	3 episodes
2009	Collision	Bill Jackson	3 episodes Television miniseries
2010	Hounded	Dr. Muhahaha	5 episodes
2010	Coronation Street	Mr. Jordan	5 episodes
2010	Schizo Samurai Shitzhu	Dr. 10	5 episodes
2010	Reggie Perrin	Mr. Fox	5 episodes
2011–2013	Mike the Knight	Sparkie the Dragon (voice)	UK version 8 episodes
2011–2016	SkaterBots	Streck (voice)	120 episodes
2011	Iconicles	Elvis the Horse (voice)	Episode: "Puddle Muddle"
2011	Tinga Tinga Tales	Majitu the Giant (voice)	Episode: "Why Bushbaby Has Big Eyes"
2011	Holby City	Nick Horton	Episode: "Big Lies, Little Lies"
2012	Dirk Gently	Terence Brown	Episode: "#1.1"
2012	Bad Education	Politician/Education Secertary	Camoe; Episode: "Politics"
2012	Harry & Paul		2 episodes
2012–2013	The Amazing World of Gumball	Additional Voices (voice)	6 episodes
2013	Jo	Captain Heger	Television miniseries Episodes: "The Opera" and "The Catacombes"; Credited as Colin McFarlan
2013	It's Kevin	Various	Episode: "#1.3"
2013–2014	Zack & Quack	Belly-Up (voice)	28 episodes
2014	EastEnders	DCI Irving	One episode
2014	Plebs	Doctor	Episode: "The Patron"
2014	Citizen Khan	DI Taylor	Episode: "The In-Laws"
2014	On Angel Wings	Joseph	Television film
2015	Casualty	Clifton Duheney	Episode: "Toxic Relationships"
2015	Death in Paradise	Anton Burrage	Episode: "The Perfect Murder"
2015	Olympus	Hades	Episode: "Truth"
2015	Doctor Who	Moran	2 episodes: "Under the Lake" and "Before the Flood"
2015	Crown for Christmas	Chancellor Riggs	Television film
2016	Father Brown	Cardinal Papillon	Episode: "The Daughter of Autolycus"
2016	A Midsummer Night's Dream	Egeus	Television film
2016	Porridge	Judge	Television film
2016	Peppa Pig	Mr. Lion (voice)	Episode: "The Zoo"
2016	Hooten & the Lady	Caleb	Television miniseries Episode: "The Caribbean"
2017	Porridge	Judge (voice)	3 episodes Television miniseries
2017	The Rebel	Roderick	Episode: "Love"
2017–2020	Thomas & Friends	Bulgy, Beresford, Dr. Holyfield, Various (voice)	UK/US versions
2018	Midsomer Murders	Jordan Briggs	Episode: "Till Death Do Us Part"
2018	Starship Goldfish	The Avianaut / Secateur	Episode: "Starship Goldfish Cartoon Pilot"
2018–2020	Outlander	Ulysses	Main character; Seasons 4–5
2020	Industry	Lord Oaki	Episode: "Nutcracker"
2020–present	Fireman Sam	Police Constable Malcolm Williams (voice)	UK/US version
2020	Fireman Sam: Norman Price and the Mystery in the Sky	Police Constable Malcolm Williams (voice)	UK/US version Television film
2021	Queens of Mystery	Finton Boyle	Episode: "#2.5"
2021	Code 404	Bad Brian	Episode: "#2.4"
2021	The Cube (U.S)	The Cube (voice)	10 episodes
2021	Milo	Suds (voice)	Channel 5
2022	Toast of Tinseltown	Weech Beacon	Episode: "3. The Scorecard"
2022	Dodger	Mr Canker	Episode: "1. Runaways"
2022	Not Going Out	Foreman	1 episode
2024; 2026	Piglets	Chief Superintendent Cunningham	9 episodes
2025	Death Valley	Bill Marcus	Episode: "#1.5"
2025	The War Between the Land and the Sea	General Austin Pierce	5 episodes
2026	Beyond Paradise	Roger Franklin	Episode: "#4.2"

=== Theatre ===
Year	Title	Role	Director	Theatre
2013	Fences	Bono	Paulette Randall	Duchess Theatre

=== Radio ===
Year	Title	Character	Production	Director
1992	Roland's Afterlife	Empoli	BBC Radio 4	Glyn Dearman
2014	Osiris: Pilot	General Trent Stone	Sherwood Sound Studios	Lisa Bowerman

=== Video games ===
Year	Title	Voice role	Notes
1996	Broken Sword: The Shadow of the Templars	Duane Henderson, Concierge, Museum Security Guard	US title: Broken Sword: Circle of Blood
1997	The City of Lost Children	Additional Voices	
1997	G-Police	Additional Voices	
1997	Lifeforce Tenka	Additional Voices	US Title: Codename: Tenka
1999	Tomb Raider: The Last Revelation	Seth	
2000	Imperium Galactica II: Alliances	Additional Voices	
2001	Gothic	NPCs	English dub
2002	Gothic II	NPCs	English dub
2003	Primal	Abaddon / King Ilbis	
2004	Fable	Thunder	
2005	Constantine	Papa Midnite	
2005	Cold Winter	Mahmoud Al-Fariq	
2005	Shinobido: Way of the Ninja	Uzimushi	English dub
2006	Buzz!: The Big Quiz	Greg the Voiceover Man	
2006	Buzz!: The Sports Quiz	Greg the Voiceover Man	
2007	Buzz!: The Mega Quiz	Greg the Voiceover Man	
2009	Buzz!: Brain of the World	Greg the Voiceover Man	
2010	Castlevania: Lords of Shadow	The Forgotten One	English dub
2011	LittleBigPlanet 2	Avalon Centrifuge	
2011	Ni no Kuni: Wrath of the White Witch	Rashaad, Rusty	English version Credited as Colin MacFarlane
2012	PlayStation All-Stars Battle Royale	Greg the Voiceover Man	
2013	Ni no Kuni: Wrath of the White Witch	Rashaad / Rusty	English dub
2015	Batman: Arkham Knight	Additional Voices	
2017	Lego Marvel Super Heroes 2	Heimdall, Horus, Red Wolf	
2019	Planet Zoo	Bernard Goodwin	
2020	Othercide	Suffering	
2022	Xenoblade Chronicles 3	Y	English dub
2023	Dead Island 2	Dr. Reuben Reed	
2023	Final Fantasy XVI	Zoltan	
2026	Lego Batman: Legacy of the Dark Knight	Jim Gordon	
