= Britannia (TV series) =

Historical fantasy drama television show

- Genre: Historical drama; Adventure; Fantasy
- Created by: Jez Butterworth; Tom Butterworth; James Richardson
- Written by: Jez Butterworth; Tom Butterworth; Richard McBrien; John-Henry Butterworth; Mackenzie Crook
- Starring: David Morrissey; Kelly Reilly; Nikolaj Lie Kaas; Mackenzie Crook; Barry Ward; Stanley Weber; Joe Armstrong; Fortunato Cerlino; Eleanor Worthington Cox; Zoë Wanamaker; Ian McDiarmid; Julian Rhind-Tutt; Hugo Speer; Daniel Caltagirone; Zaqi Ismail; Annabel Scholey; Steve Pemberton; Liana Cornell
- Opening theme: "Hurdy Gurdy Man" by Donovan (series 1); "Season of the Witch" by Donovan (series 2); "Children of the Revolution" by T. Rex (series 3)
- Composer: Neil Davidge
- Countries of origin: United Kingdom; United States (series 1, 3)
- Original language: English
- No. of series: 3
- No. of episodes: 27

Production
- Executive producers: James Richardson; Pippa Harris; Sam Mendes; Nicolas Brown; Anne Thomopoulos
- Producer: Rick McCallum
- Production locations: Czech Republic; Wales
- Running time: 40–73 minutes
- Production companies: Vertigo Films; Neal Street Productions; Sky Studios (series 3)

Original release
- Network: Sky Atlantic (United Kingdom); Amazon Prime Video (United States; series 1); Epix (United States; series 3)
- Release: 18 January 2018 – 12 October 2021

Britannia is a British historical fantasy drama television series created by Jez Butterworth and Tom Butterworth. The show was the first co-production between Sky UK and Amazon Prime Video and stars Kelly Reilly, David Morrissey, Zoë Wanamaker, Mackenzie Crook, Nikolaj Lie Kaas, and Eleanor Worthington Cox. It first aired on Sky Atlantic in the UK beginning 18 January 2018 and on Amazon Prime Video in the US beginning 26 January 2018. The first series aired on Epix beginning 2 August 2020. Pop songs were used as theme music for the three series to date: Donovan's "Hurdy Gurdy Man" (series 1), his "Season of the Witch" (series 2), and "Children of the Revolution" by T. Rex (series 3). In March 2023, the series was cancelled after three seasons.

== Synopsis ==
Britannia is set in 43 AD, when the Romans invaded Britain. Julius Caesar had failed to conquer Britain 90 years earlier.

General Aulus Plautius and his second-in-command Lucius are determined to succeed where Julius Caesar failed, by any means necessary. An experienced warrior, Aulus establishes a fortified camp, gathers information from captives, even children, and learns that the Druids are the driving force behind the many tribes he faces. He determines that "you don't conquer the people, you must conquer their gods." He meets the Druids and undertakes a vision quest. Soon, he is talking aloud to Lokka, a demon king.

Young Cait of the Cantii tribe is about to take part in a ceremony to mark her becoming an adult woman when the Romans attack and largely destroy her tribe. She is forced to flee and wanders the forest, where she encounters and attaches herself to an unlikely protector, Divis "The Outcast".

Divis is a Druid with some mystical powers—divination, hypnosis, visions—but seems mad and has been driven into exile by Veran, leader of the Druids in Britannia. Divis roams the countryside seeking clues to the meaning of his apocalyptic visions, and believes he is on some kind of mysterious "mission".

Kerra, a princess as the daughter of the Cantii King Pellenor, frets for her people's safety. The Cantii are in a perpetual feud with the Regni, a powerful and large tribe. The Cantii's only protection is an impregnable natural fortress formed from granite. Yet, King Pellenor makes no preparations to resist the Romans, other than relying on vague hints from the Druids to set policy. Kerra's brother, Phelan, appears weak. Kerra ambitiously takes her own steps to address the Roman threat, calling for a parley and venturing into Regni territory. Her actions enrage her father, who sends her to be judged by the Druids, and possibly flayed alive, as happened to her mother.

In the maelstrom of confusion and fear caused by the invasion, Romans and Britons ally with, and betray, each other as the Romans consolidate their position and disaster looms.

== Cast and characters ==
=== Romans ===
- David Morrissey as Aulus Plautius
- Fortunato Cerlino as Vespasian (Series 1)
- Hugo Speer as Lucius
- Daniel Caltagirone as Brutus (Series 1, 3; guest Series 2)
- Aaron Pierre as Antonius (Series 1)
- Zaqi Ismail as Philo (Series 1, 3; guest Series 2)
- Gershwyn Eustache Jnr as Vitus
- René Zagger as Decimus (Series 1)
- Gerard Monaco as Roman Deserter 2 (Series 1)
- Steve Pemberton as Emperor Claudius (Series 2)
- Anthony Barclay as Josephus the Levantine (Series 2)
- Sophie Okonedo as Hemple, wife of Aulus Plautius (Series 3)

=== Cantii ===
- Kelly Reilly as Kerra (Series 1)
- Ian McDiarmid as King Pellenor (Series 1)
- Julian Rhind-Tutt as Phelan
- Annabel Scholey as Amena
- Samantha Colley as Andra (Series 2)
- Barry Ward as Sawyer (Series 1; guest Series 2–3)
- Callie Cooke as Islene (Series 1; guest Series 3)
- Eleanor Worthington Cox as Cait

=== Regni ===
- Zoë Wanamaker as Queen Antedia (Series 1, 3; guest Series 2)
- Joe Armstrong as Gildas (Series 1)
- Liana Cornell as Ania

=== Druids ===
- Mackenzie Crook as Veran and Harka
- Gianni Calchetti as Rork Druid and Moss Face
- Jodie McNee as Willa
- Jack Roth as Ossian (Series 1)
- David Bradley as Quane
- Abigail Rice as Elder 1
- Peter Hosking as Elder 2 (Recurring)
- Bluey Robinson as Rayne (Series 3)

=== Other ===
- Nikolaj Lie Kaas as Divis / The Outcast
- Stanley Weber as Lindon of the Gauls (Series 1)
- Gary Oliver as Jhehutamisu (Guest)
- Tolga Safer as Aziz (Guest)
- Laura Donnelly as Hella (Series 1–2; guest Series 3)
- Liran Nathan as Crucified Man (Guest)

== Episodes ==
Series	Episodes	Originally released		
Series	Episodes	First released	Last released	Network
1	9	18 January 2018	15 March 2018	Sky Atlantic; Amazon Prime Video
2	10	7 November 2019	2 January 2020	Sky Atlantic
3	8	24 August 2021	12 October 2021	Sky Atlantic; Epix

=== Series 1 (2018) ===
Note: Every episode was available in the United Kingdom by download from Sky "catch up" following the first episode satellite broadcast.

No. overall	No. in series	Title	Directed by	Written by	Original release date
1	1	"Woe to the Vanquished"	Metin Hüseyin	Jez Butterworth and Tom Butterworth	18 January 2018
In 43 AD, a nation is rocked by the arrival of an Empire.
2	2	"Secret Alliances"	Sue Tully	Tom Butterworth	25 January 2018
Having marked Rome's arrival with blood, Aulus sends envoys to parley with the tribes of Britannia, while also looking to learn more about the Druids.
3	3	"Honor and Betrayals"	Sue Tully	Jez Butterworth and Richard McBrien	1 February 2018
Aulus is reborn, but his destiny remains unclear. Cait is able to locate her father, but she can't free him from the Roman camp alone.
4	4	"Judgment of the Gods"	Luke Watson	Tom Butterworth	8 February 2018
King Pellanor disowns Kerra and leaves her life in the hands of the Druids. But the gods' judgement is not what he expected.
5	5	"Tractations"	Luke Watson	Jez Butterworth	15 February 2018
The gods have spoken, but Kerra must decide if she will accept their ruling. Antedia seals an alliance with Rome - on one condition.
6	6	"The Chosen One"	Sheree Folkson	Tom Butterworth	22 February 2018
After their long ordeal, Cait and her father finally arrive at the safety of the Cantii citadel, but a demon is on her trail.
7	7	"Alone in the World"	Sheree Folkson	Jez Butterworth	1 March 2018
Cait and her father seek shelter in the ruins of their old home, where she is visited by someone she never expected to see again.
8	8	"Initiation"	Christoph Schrewe	Jez Butterworth	8 March 2018
The battle of wills between Kerra and Antedia intensifies, as the Regni play their trump card. Aulus enlists deadly exiles to find Cait.
9	9	"Pax Romana"	Christoph Schrewe	Tom Butterworth	15 March 2018
The end appears to be close for the Cantii, as Aulus unveils how the Roman Empire truly conducts business.

=== Series 2 (2019) ===
Note: Every episode was available in the United Kingdom by download from Sky "catch up" following the first episode satellite broadcast.

No. overall	No. in series	Title	Directed by	Written by	Original release date
10	1	"Imperial Visit"	Luke Watson	Tom Butterworth	7 November 2019
Two years after the invasion, a dead man awakens who could spell the end of everything.
11	2	"May the Gods Speak"	Luke Watson	Jez Butterworth	14 November 2019
The Dead Man sends Hella on a mission. Phelan's new life comes crashing down and Rork's suspicions about Veran lead him into a duel.
12	3	"Genesis"	Luke Watson	Tom Butterworth	21 November 2019
Veran gives Ania a terrible choice. Harka brings Phelan under his spell and the next stage of Cait and Divis's prophecy begins.
13	4	"Dark Game"	Rob Savage	Jez Butterworth	28 November 2019
Hella makes Aulus an offer she knows he cannot resist. Phelan fulfils his mission and Cait and Divis' dreams spell new danger.
14	5	"My Sister, the Queen"	Rob Savage	Tom Butterworth	7 November 2019
A dream causes tension between Cait and Divis. Harka sends Love on a heart-breaking mission and Veran commits the ultimate betrayal.
15	6	"The Eagle's Arms"	Rob Savage	John Henry Butterworth	5 December 2019
Philo and Brutus play a prank, but their timing could not be worse. Harka sends Veran a message.
16	7	"Alliance of Dark Forces"	Lisa James Larsson	John Henry Butterworth	12 December 2019
Vitus returns with a message for Aulus. Ania is placed in an impossible situation and The Traveller tracks down Lucius.
17	8	"A Painful Truth"	Lisa James Larsson	Tom Butterworth	19 December 2019
Aulus outrages Domitius with a confession and Andra discovers the truth about her family. Divis tries to use his powers on Love.
18	9	"The Crossroads"	Issa López	Jez Butterworth	26 December 2019
Divis gets one last chance to prove himself. Meanwhile, Cait's newfound happiness is cut short as Phelan tries to right his wrongs.
19	10	"The Challenge"	Issa López	Tom Butterworth	2 January 2020
Veran and Harka face each other in a challenge only one of them can survive. Cait is forced to face her destiny.

=== Series 3 (2021) ===
Note: Every episode was available in the United Kingdom by download from Sky "catch up" following the first episode satellite broadcast. Episodes 2 to 8 premiered on Sky Atlantic in Germany.

No. overall	No. in series	Title	Directed by	Written by	Original release date
20	1	"The Return of the chosen one"	Ben Gregor	Jez Butterworth	24 August 2021
In Rome, Aulus makes a sacrifice to the cult of Lokka; back in Britannia, Aulus tries to negotiate with the Druids before he receives a visitor; Cait has a bone to pick with Veran.
21	2	"The Moon Tree"	Ben Gregor	Tom Butterworth & Jez Butterworth	26 August 2021
Antedia escapes from cruel captivity and Cait runs from a brief encounter with Lucius at a Roman Road Building Camp; Hemple and her Acolytes are now established in Aulus's Villa.
22	3	"War Chest"	Ben Gregor	Tom Butterworth & Jez Butterworth	5 September 2021
Cait and Antedia team up on the road whilst Divis struggles to cope with a novice Druid and new arrivals in camp; Aulus visits the Underworld and Cait witnesses Antedia's vengeful nature.
23	4	"The Big Vision"	Joasia Goldyn	Jez Butterworth	5 September 2021
Cait and Antedia stay together after running from more trouble; Amena and Willa appear to set a trap for Aulus and Hemple; Veran gathers the Druids and Cait selects companions for a journey.
24	5	"Hemple's Machinations"	Joasia Goldyn	Tom Butterworth	9 September 2021
Cait and her companions go in search of Lucius and the Spear of the Silver Dawn; Aulus takes a cohort in search of the same prize; Hemple is left behind at the Villa and approaches Willa for help.
25	6	"A Precious Asset"	Mackenzie Crook	Mackenzie Crook	9 September 2021
Cait and her team's rescue mission to free Lucius is thwarted by Aulus who gets there first; Veran seeks to destroy and mounts a devastating and unexpected attack on Aulus's Villa.
26	7	"The Viaduct"	Joasia Goldyn	Tom Butterworth	16 September 2021
Amena and Hemple follow in Aulus's footsteps; Cait and her band find a snake trap in the form of a huge Roman Aqueduct where they plan an attack; Aulus interrogates Lucius about the spear.
27	8	"Vae Victis"	Mackenzie Crook	Tom Butterworth & Jez Butterworth	16 September 2021
Aulus takes Lucius & a few survivors to a remote fortress where he is joined by Amena & Hemple; Cait finds her way to the fort and Antedia launches an attack with a firestorm, as Divis & others arrive.

== Production ==
The first series was produced by Rick McCallum, Vertigo Films and Neal Street Productions and shot on location in Czech Republic and Wales. Most dialogue in the series is spoken in English, which is used mostly to represent Vulgar Latin spoken by the Romans and Brythonic spoken by the Celts. Latin and Welsh (with English subtitles) are also used to represent both ancient languages, respectively, particularly in rituals and other scenes with formulaic language.

In March 2018, it was announced that Sky Atlantic had renewed the show for a second series. Amazon was not involved in production and did not stream the second season.

The show was renewed for a third series in January 2020. In June 2020, U.S. premium network Epix announced it would partner with Sky to produce the third series. It would also air the first series beginning August 2, 2020, and the second series beginning October 4, 2020. Filming of the third series was shut down in March 2020 due to the Coronavirus pandemic, and resumed in September 2020.

Season 2 began streaming on Amazon Prime in June 2021.

=== Lawsuit ===
In 2024, Deadline reported that British writer Benjamin Crushcov filed suit against Sky and the series' executive producers, claiming that Britannia was based on his spec project Tribus, and seeking damages (approx. $8.5 million) as well as a public apology. In a statement, Sky denied the allegations. Crushcov's case was dismissed in May 2025, with the judge ruling his claims "go nowhere".

== Reception ==
Critical response of Britannia
Season	Rotten Tomatoes	Metacritic
1	76% (37 reviews)	70 (8 reviews)
2	100% (8 reviews)	—N/a
3	100% (8 reviews)	—N/a

The first season received positive reviews. The review aggregator website Rotten Tomatoes reported a 76% approval rating, with an average rating of 6.54/10 based on 37 reviews, with site's critics consensus saying:

"Brilliantly bonkers, Britannia's duplicitous characters and campy fantasy won't be for everyone, but those looking for less-serious swords and sorcery may enjoy its spellbinding madness."

On Metacritic, which uses a weighted average, the first season scored 70 out of 100, based on eight reviews, indicating "generally favorable reviews".
