= Before the Flood (Doctor Who) =

255b – "Before the Flood"
- Doctor Who episode

Cast
- Doctor: Peter Capaldi – Twelfth Doctor
- Companion: Jenna Coleman – Clara Oswald
- Others: Colin McFarlane – Moran; Sophie Stone – Cass; Zaqi Ismail – Lunn; Morven Christie – O'Donnell; Arsher Ali – Bennett; Steven Robertson – Pritchard; Paul Kaye – Prentis; Neil Fingleton – Fisher King; Peter Serafinowicz – Voice of Fisher King; Corey Taylor – Roar of Fisher King

Production
- Directed by: Daniel O'Hara
- Written by: Toby Whithouse
- Produced by: Derek Ritchie
- Executive producers: Steven Moffat; Brian Minchin
- Music by: Murray Gold
- Series: Series 9
- Running time: 2nd of 2-part story, 42 minutes
- First broadcast: 10 October 2015

Chronology
← Preceded by "Under the Lake"	Followed by → "The Girl Who Died"

"Before the Flood" is the fourth episode of the ninth series of the British science fiction television series Doctor Who. It was written by Toby Whithouse and directed by Daniel O'Hara. It was first broadcast on 10 October 2015, and is the second part of a two-part story; the first part, "Under the Lake", aired on 3 October.

Set in Scotland in 1980 and 2119, the episode is a "bootstrap paradox" where the alien time traveller the Twelfth Doctor (Peter Capaldi) prevents the invasion plot of an alien called the Fisher King (Neil Fingleton and Peter Serafinowicz) while also saving the life of his companion Clara (Jenna Coleman) in the future through the use of information the Doctor received that he would later send to himself.

The episode was watched by 6.05 million viewers and received positive reviews, who praised Capaldi’s performance, but criticised the utilisation of the Fisher King.

== Plot ==
The Twelfth Doctor, O'Donnell, and Bennett arrive in a Scottish town in 1980, before the town was flooded, and the day the salvaged alien craft from the future landed. O'Donnell and Bennett observe the ship still has the stasis chamber, both power cells, and the absence of glyphs on the walls. They are met by Prentis, a Tivolian funeral director whom O'Donnell recognises as one of the ghosts in the future. Prentis landed on the "barren" planet Earth to bury the Fisher King, a former enslaver of the Tivolians.

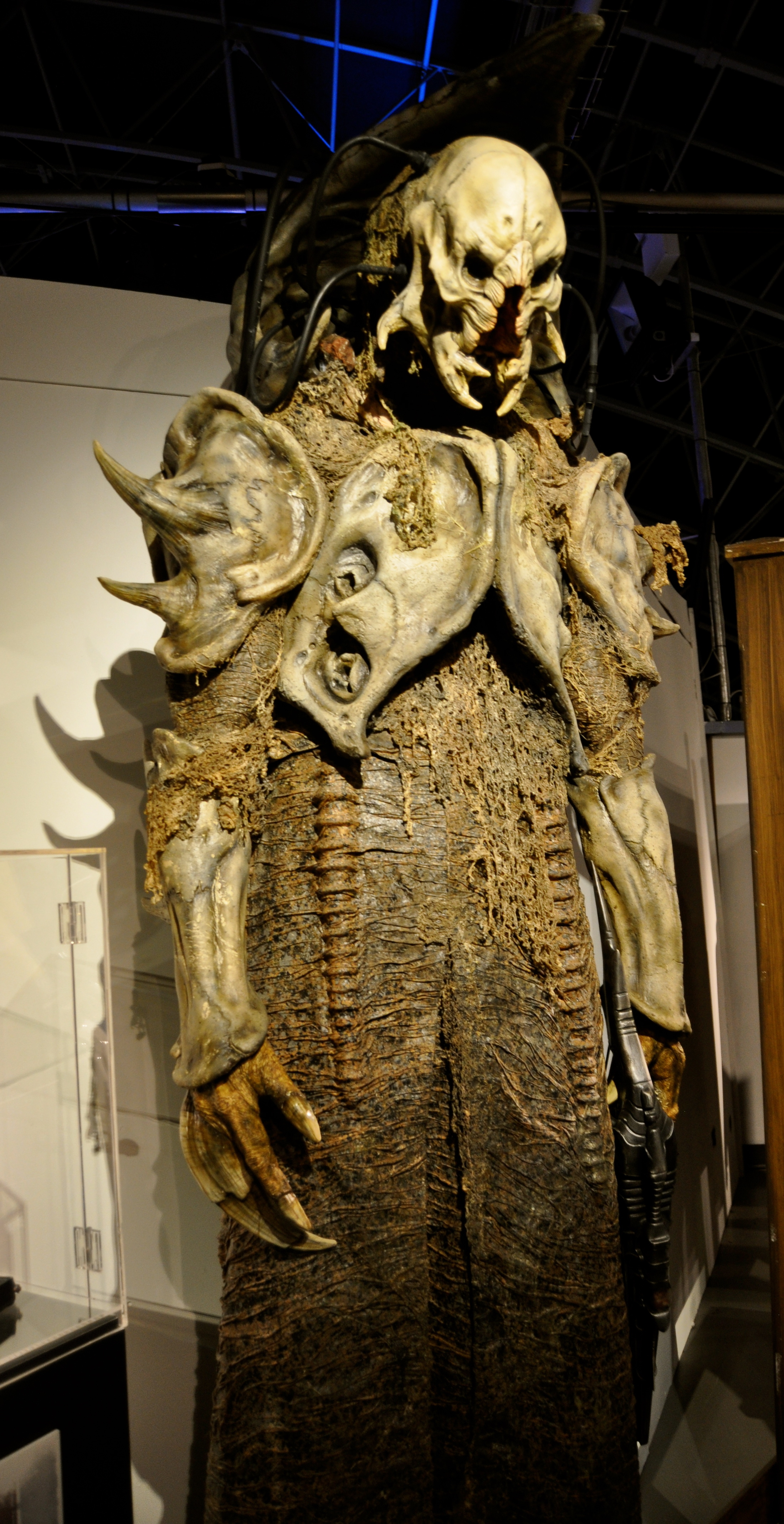
The Fisher King, as shown at the Doctor Who Experience

A ghost of the Doctor has appeared outside the mining facility near the flooded town in 2119, mouthing a set of names, those of the crew, Prentis, the Doctor, and Clara. Clara relays this to the Doctor in the past, who laments he now knows his future. During this, the still-alive Fisher King escapes the ship, leaving the slab he laid on, kills Prentis, scratches the glyphs into the walls, and takes the stasis chamber from the ship to the church. O'Donnell is killed, and the Doctor confirms his theory that his ghost's list is the order in which they will die. When the Doctor and Bennett try to return to the future to save Clara, the TARDIS sends them back half an hour.

The Fisher King confronts the Doctor, affirming that his glyphs and the ghosts he creates with them will send a signal that will draw an armada to enslave humanity. The Doctor says he removed the glyphs from the ship's wall. The Fisher King returns to the ship to find the Doctor lied to him, as the glyphs are still on the walls. The Doctor had set one of the power cells to destroy the dam, flooding the town, and killing the Fisher King. The TARDIS transports Bennett to the future.

In the future, the Doctor's ghost releases the other ghosts from the Faraday cage. Clara, Cass, and Lunn are cornered in the hangar bay, when the stasis chamber opens, revealing the Doctor, who had used it to survive the flood. He creates the image of the ghost Doctor to lure the ghosts to the Faraday cage and trap them there until UNIT can arrive to remove it. The Doctor wipes the memories of the glyphs from everyone's minds.

The plot of the episode is a bootstrap paradox—the Doctor programmed the ghost to say the list of names because that is what the ghost's message said.

=== Continuity ===
In the prologue, the Doctor performs Beethoven's Symphony No. 5 with his electric guitar. The Doctor had previously been shown playing such an instrument atop a tank in the ninth series opener, "The Magician's Apprentice".

The electric guitar amplifier seen in the Doctor's prologue has a plaque reading Magpie Electricals, a shop originally owned by Mr Magpie and visited by the Tenth Doctor and Rose Tyler in the episode "The Idiot's Lantern". The name often appears on electronic equipment throughout the series, such as Martha Jones' television in "The Sound of Drums", and a shop with the same name is seen in "The Beast Below".

O'Donnell mentions prior companions Rose Tyler, Martha Jones, and Amy Pond, as well as Harold Saxon and events from "Kill the Moon". She also mentions "the Minister of War", but the Doctor has no knowledge of this, surmising that this will be in his future.

The Tivolian race previously appeared in the episode "The God Complex". Prentis says they were liberated from the Fisher King's people by the "glorious Arcateenians", only to be conquered by them in turn; the Arcateenians were first mentioned in the Torchwood episode "Greeks Bearing Gifts". Both episodes were written by Toby Whithouse.

The TARDIS' "Security Protocol 712" first appeared in "Blink". Other console room holograms have included the Emergency Program One ("The Parting of the Ways") and the "voice interface" with a holographic feature ("Let's Kill Hitler").

The Fisher King describes Time Lords as "cowardly, vain curators who suddenly remembered they had teeth and became the most war-like race in the galaxy," referring to the Time Lords' passive role in earlier series and their subsequent participation in the Time War.

=== Outside references ===
During the episode's prologue, the Doctor mentions that he met the actual Ludwig van Beethoven – a "nice chap, very intense". The Tenth Doctor alluded to such a meeting in "Music of the Spheres".

O'Donnell alludes to Neil Armstrong's famous line from the first Moon walk: "That's one small step for a man, one giant leap for mankind". The Eleventh Doctor made use of Armstrong's line when he first defeated the Silence in "Day of the Moon".

Prentis has business cards with the motto "May the remorse be with you." This is a pun on the Star Wars catchphrase "May The Force Be With You".

== Production ==
Unusually, the opening theme was performed with an electric guitar for the episode. The inclusion of an electric guitar was prompted by a joke from Twelfth Doctor actor Peter Capaldi, who performed the theme for the episode, as well as Beethoven's Symphony No. 5 in the prologue. Capaldi was vocalist and lead guitarist in the 1980s punk band The Dreamboys, alongside drummer Craig Ferguson.

The filming location for the village portrayed in the episode was Caerwent.

== Broadcast and reception ==
Doctor Who saw a considerable rise in the overnight ratings to 4.38 million (up from 3.74 million the previous week). The show had a 21.5% share of the available audience and little competition from the Rugby World Cup. Doctor Who came fourth for the day, ratings wise. It received an Appreciation Index score of 83. Overall, the episode had 6.05 million viewers after a week of timeshifting, a rise of 1.67 million on the overnight figure. The show came eighth on BBC1 for the week.

=== Critical reception ===
Professional ratings
Aggregate scores
Source	Rating
Rotten Tomatoes (Average Score)	8.52
Rotten Tomatoes (Tomatometer)	95%
Review scores
Source	Rating
The A.V. Club	B+
Paste Magazine	8.9
SFX Magazine	3.5/4 stars
TV Fanatic	4/5 stars
IndieWire	A
IGN	9.0
New York Magazine	5/5 stars
The Daily Telegraph	3/5 stars
Radio Times	3/5 stars

"Before the Flood" received positive reviews. The episode holds a 95% score on Rotten Tomatoes, the highest of the series, with an average score of 8.5. The site's consensus reads "Doctor Who provides a satisfying conclusion to the previous installment's cliffhanger with "Before the Flood," a playful and exciting episode".

IGN praised the episode, giving 9 out of 10 (Amazing). They praised the resolution to the episode particularly, as well as the performances of Capaldi and the guest cast. Dan Martin of The Guardian praised Coleman's performance, believing her and Capaldi to be "surely now one of the most successful pairings in Doctor Who's history." He praised the design of the Fisher King admitting that it actually scared him. Morgan Jeffrey of Digital Spy thought the episode was "scary and smart," and an improvement over the previous episode. But he was disappointed by the lack of screen time given to Paul Kaye's character Prentis and some of the crew members of the base. Overall he felt that the story was Whithouse's best since "School Reunion". Den of Geek gave the episode a positive review, praising Capaldi, saying, "it just feels like he utterly belongs there...he's been on excellent, excellent form." However, they found the design and use of the Fisher King to be "not really very arresting, really. Disappointing, even." Overall, they found the episode to be "patchier than last week's, but I'm not grumbling about the strength of the two parter, I do still strongly feel that the move towards two-parters has been beneficial to Doctor Who series 9 thus far."

However, Catherine Gee of The Daily Telegraph gave the episode 3 stars out of 5, arguing that the episode "needed more Fisher King."
