= Tales from the Poop Deck =

British children's comedy programme

- Genre: Children
- Developed by: Lenny Barker, Vicki Stepney
- Starring: Helen Atkinson Wood, Charles Gray, Nicholas Pritchard, Colin McFarlane, Paul Shearer, Bunny Reed, Mike Grady, Dudley Sutton, Griff Rhys Jones
- Country of origin: United Kingdom
- Original language: English
- No. of seasons: 1
- No. of episodes: 6

Production
- Production location: UK
- Running time: 30 minutes
- Production companies: Talkback Productions; Central Independent Television

Original release
- Network: ITV
- Release: 7 April – 12 May 1992

Tales from the Poop Deck is a CITV children's comedy programme about Connie Blackheart's adventures as a pirate, and her battles with Admiral De'Ath. It is set in the 18th century. Premiering in April 1992 with 25-minute episodes, it was cancelled later that same year.

== Episode list ==
1. Here Be Pirates
2. Traitors and Treasure
3. Marooned
4. The Fog Of The Dead
5. Mutiny
6. Till Death Us Do Part
