= Vilma Jackson =

English actor and performer

Vilma Jackson is an English actor and performer. She is known for portraying the role of Charlie in Coronation Street. She is Deaf and a British Sign Language user. In 2020 Jackson wrote, produced, and performed in a short film, "Triple Oppression", which deals with the challenges she faces as Black, Deaf, and a woman. The short won for Best Inspirational Film at the New York Film Awards, the FilmCon Awards, the Festigious International Film Festival, and the Los Angeles Film Awards. In 2021 she launched her own chat show, available online.

She founded the production company Vilma Jackson Productions in 2020. In 2023 she wrote, directed and starred in the short film The Cycle, which explores domestic abuse through the eyes of a Deaf woman. A film that premiered at Rich Mix, London, in October 2023, and has won 10 international awards and 3 nominations.

== Biography ==
Jackson grew up in Mozambique and attended boarding school in Portugal, before moving to London, where she attended Harrow College studying Performing Arts and also trained in the Meisner Acting Technique. Her career spans film, stage, television drama, music video, public service broadcasting and theatre credits.

She has collaborated with deaf poet Raymond Antrobus in a performance that blends his poem "Dear hearing world" with music and sign language. She was in a leading role for Dear Hearing World (Short Film) and received five winning awards for Best Short Film, and other categories.

She also appeared in the short Almost by director Teresa Garratty, which won her Best Performance at OutlantaCon Short Film Festival in 2020, and in the short Sign Night with actress Sophie Stone, which was broadcast on the BBC.

She is a dancer and sign-song performer and she uses her performance to discuss in Sign Language essential issues such as cultural appropriation and the Black Lives Matter movement.
