= Under the Lake =

255a – "Under the Lake"
- Doctor Who episode

Cast
- Doctor: Peter Capaldi – Twelfth Doctor
- Companion: Jenna Coleman – Clara Oswald
- Others: Colin McFarlane – Moran; Sophie Stone – Cass; Zaqi Ismail – Lunn; Morven Christie – O'Donnell; Arsher Ali – Bennett; Steven Robertson – Pritchard; Paul Kaye – Prentis

Production
- Directed by: Daniel O'Hara
- Written by: Toby Whithouse
- Produced by: Derek Ritchie
- Executive producers: Steven Moffat; Brian Minchin
- Music by: Murray Gold
- Series: Series 9
- Running time: 1st of 2-part story, 43 minutes
- First broadcast: 3 October 2015

Chronology
← Preceded by "The Witch's Familiar"	Followed by → "Before the Flood"

"Under the Lake" is the third episode of the ninth series of the British science fiction television series Doctor Who. It was first broadcast on BBC One on 3 October 2015. It is the first part of a two-part story, the second of which is "Before the Flood" on 10 October; both were written by Toby Whithouse and directed by Daniel O'Hara.

The episode is set in a Scottish underwater mining facility in 2119, where the Twelfth Doctor (Peter Capaldi) and his companion Clara Oswald (Jenna Coleman) arrive three days after the crew have unearthed an empty spacecraft in the lake. The crew begin dying, and the survivors find themselves faced with an army of reality-manipulating ghosts. In the form of Prentis, (played by Paul Kaye) this episode sees the return of the Tivolians, a race last seen in the 2011 episode "The God Complex", also written by Whithouse.

The episode was watched by 5.63 million viewers and received positive reviews from television critics, with praise directed to the atmosphere, old-fashioned style and the cliffhanger.

== Plot ==
The crew of an underwater mining facility in Caithness, Scotland in 2119 discover an alien craft in the ruins of a submerged town. They bring it aboard only to find it is missing one of its two power cells, and four symbols carved into the interior walls. The engines suddenly ignite, and Commander Moran is killed. Later, the crew finds two ghostly figures, Moran and an unidentified alien, roaming during the night cycle, soundlessly chanting before turning to attack the crew. The crew take shelter in the base's Faraday cage which the ghosts cannot enter.

The Twelfth Doctor and Clara arrive later via the TARDIS and are briefed by acting commander Cass, who is deaf and assisted by her interpreter Lunn. Suddenly the base's systems switch to the night cycle, and before they can restore the day cycle, the ghosts have killed another crew member, and soon the ghost of that crew joins the other two. The Doctor recognises the alien ghost as a Tivolian, a cowardly, peaceful race. Cass calls for an evacuation shuttle only to learn one has already been dispatched. The Doctor orders it to turn around, believing the ghosts have a nefarious purpose.

The Doctor is able to lure the ghosts into the Faraday cage, and with Cass's help, works out what they are chanting: "the dark, the sword, the forsaken, the temple". The Doctor determines these are galactic coordinates pointing to this location and believes that the ghosts are killing the crew and trying to draw more victims to boost the strength of the broadcast of this signal; however, only those that have seen the symbols in the ship are susceptible to the ghosts' influence. Using the base's remote drones, they find and collect a stasis chamber among the ruins, which the Doctor suspects is what the coordinates point to, but they cannot open it. The Doctor determines he must go back in time before the town was flooded to find the origin of the signal. The ghosts manipulate the electrical systems of the base and separate Clara, Cass, and Lunn from the Doctor and crew members O'Donnell and Bennett. The Doctor promises Clara he will be back and takes O'Donnell and Bennett with him to the TARDIS. Shortly after the TARDIS' departure, Clara, Cass, and Lunn witness a new ghost outside of the base – the ghost of the Doctor.

=== Continuity ===
The Doctor says that the ghost in the top hat is from the planet Tivoli, first mentioned in the Eleventh Doctor story "The God Complex", which featured a member of its native species named Gibbis.

When pondering what the ghosts actually are, the Doctor eliminates the possibility that they are flesh avatars ("The Rebel Flesh" / "The Almost People"), Autons (Spearhead from Space et al.), or digital copies in the Nethersphere ("Dark Water" / "Death in Heaven").

One of the Doctor's "cards" has him offering reassurance that no-one, among other disasters, is going to be "exterminated/upgraded". This is a scripted response to potential Dalek and/or Cybermen encounters. Another is an apology for dropping someone off in Aberdeen, which refers to the Doctor mistakenly dropping off companion Sarah Jane Smith in Aberdeen, rather than Croydon in The Hand of Fear (1976) (as later revealed in "School Reunion" (2006)).

=== Outside references ===
When planning to abandon the base, Cass wants her superiors to send marines or "ghostbusters", an allusion to the 1984 film. She tells the Doctor that he can do the "whole Cabin in the Woods thing" if he wants to stay, another film reference.

The Doctor mentions meeting Shirley Bassey and reveals that he is not a fan of Peter Andre's "Mysterious Girl": after suffering a two-week earworm of the song, he "was begging for the brush of death's merciful hand."

== Production ==
The "Readthrough Draft" of the script for this episode, glimpsed in the online "Doctor Who Extra" focusing on Cass & Lunn, was titled "Ghost in the Machine".

=== Cast notes ===
Colin McFarlane, who plays Moran in this episode, had previously featured in the 2007 Christmas episode, "Voyage of the Damned", in which he voiced the Heavenly Host, and additionally appeared in spin-off series Torchwood, in four episodes of Children of Earth, as General Pierce.

== Broadcast and reception ==
Overnight viewings for this episode were 3.74 million, a small improvement from the episode broadcast a week beforehand, The Witch's Familiar. However, the final consolidated ratings were 5.63 million, the second-lowest of any episode of Doctor Who since the show was revived in 2005. Much like the previous episode, the lower ratings were possibly due to the England v Australia match in the 2015 Rugby World Cup airing simultaneously. The episode received an Appreciation Index score of 84.

=== Critical reception ===
Professional ratings
Aggregate scores
Source	Rating
Rotten Tomatoes (Average Score)	7.6
Rotten Tomatoes (Tomatometer)	83%
Review scores
Source	Rating
The A.V. Club	B+
Paste Magazine	8.7
SFX Magazine	3/5 stars
TV Fanatic	3/5 stars
IGN	8.5
New York Magazine	3/5 stars
Daily Telegraph	5/5 stars
Radio Times	3/5 stars

"Under the Lake" received positive reviews from TV critics, with many praising the episode's creepy atmosphere and old fashioned style. The episode received a score of 83% on Rotten Tomatoes, with an average score of 7.6. The site's consensus reads "Part one of two, "Under the Lake" scares up a good, old-fashioned ghost story, which may remind viewers of the original series – for better or worse".

Morgan Jeffery of Digital Spy praised the episode, labelling it "atmospheric". He further went on to say "It's this sense of claustrophobia that is among the episode's biggest selling points – watching a crew's camaraderie crumble as the pressure gets to them never grows old. Gloomy visuals and a haunting score from Murray Gold also do much to generate atmosphere and tension" and closed his review stating "Chills, action, adventure – this is old-school Doctor Who given a modern sheen and, most of all, it's enormous fun". Michael Hogan of The Daily Telegraph acclaimed the episode, awarding it a perfect five stars. He said "This rollicking, hair-raising romp demonstrated that the sci-fi franchise still has the power to thrill and chill in equal measure". He closed his review by claiming "Forty minutes flew by and the credits rolled too soon, leaving on a creepy cliffhanger that left me baying for more. If next week’s conclusion of the story – and the 12-part series as a whole – can keep up the standard set by the opening three episodes, we’re in for a treat. Doctor Who will have regenerated once more".

Alasdair Wilkins of The A.V. Club also enjoyed the episode, awarding it a B+ grade. Calling the episode "impeccably structured", he further stated that it "has a tightness of narrative focus that often eludes the first episodes of Doctor Who two-parters". He closed his review by saying the episode "works beautifully as a propulsive monsters story" and stating "A simple, focused first episode figures to set up a twisted, sprawling second half. But even without seeing the payoff, it’s hard to imagine more efficient narrative construction for whatever that conclusion might be". Jon Cooper of The Independent lavished praise onto the episode, calling it "spooky with a sci-fi slant" and saying that "while the show has tackled this sort of narrative countless times before, it has rarely been done with such palpable tension and slow-burning dread". He further stated "As secrets were uncovered and deductions made, the plot rattled along with a pace that ended up as satisfying as it was intriguing", and closed his review by saying "in terms of wonderfully solid and spooky TV there’s nothing to moan about here". Scott Collura of IGN was also highly impressed with the episode, awarding it a score of 8.5/10, deemed by the site as "great". He particularly praised the episode's cliffhanger ending, stating "But oh, the ending of this episode! So great", and summarised his review with "I always welcome the creature-feature Doctor Who episodes, and "Under the Lake" does that tradition proud. The shimmering, ghastly specters are scary enough, but the apparent fate of the Doctor in this cliffhanger is the real shocker".
