= Milo (TV series) =

British-Spanish-Italian animated series

- Genre: Children's television series Preschool
- Created by: Rowena Blyth; Chris Capstick; Joe Moroney
- Written by: Lisa Akhurst; Sam Barlow; Sean Carson; Gillian Corderoy; Liam Farrel; Seyi Odusanya; Chris Parker; Rebecca Stevens; Jen Upton
- Directed by: Chris Capstick
- Voices of: Evan Capstick; Eleanor Stollery; George Ravenscroft; Colin MacFarlane
- Countries of origin: United Kingdom; Spain; Italy
- Original language: English
- No. of seasons: 2
- No. of episodes: 78

Production
- Executive producers: Joe Moroney; Louise Bucknole; Louise Burgess
- Producer: Ignacio Segura
- Editors: Danny Brown; Michael Treacy
- Running time: 11 minutes
- Production companies: Planeta Junior; Fourth Wall Animation; British Film Institute's Young Audiences Content Fund

Original release
- Network: Channel 5 Milkshake! PBS Kids
- Release: 10 May 2021 – present

Milo is an animated television preschool series that first aired on Channel 5's Milkshake! block on 10 May 2021 in the United Kingdom. It later made its debut on the PBS Kids channel in the United States on May 13, 2024.

The series, produced by Fourth Wall Animation and distributed by Planeta Junior, was commissioned in May 2021 by the British Film Institute's Young Audiences Content Fund. Though this fund was eliminated in 2023, Liverpool City Region Combined Authority’s Flexible Growth Fund provided major funding for a second season of the show, following the success of the first season. This series is animated completely using Toon Boom Animation's computer information systems.

== Premise ==
The series follows Milo, a 5-year-old black cat and his friends, Lofty, a tall giraffe and Lark, a bird as they explore different jobs and professions. Milo lives in Milotown with his parents, who run a dry cleaning shop called Scrubby’s Dry Clean Shop. In each episode, a washing machine robot named Suds lets Milo and his friends try on the clothes of the workers of the town. Through role play, they learn about the many vocational careers found around town.

== Characters ==
- Milo (voiced by Evan Capstick) is a 5-year-old black cat. He is adventurous and curious about jobs.
- Lark (voiced by Eleanor Stollery) is a blue bird. She is very intelligent and likes to read.
- Lofty (voiced by George Ravenscroft) is a tall giraffe. He is a bit clumsy and very worrisome, but always willing to help his friends.
- Suds (voiced by Colin MacFarlane) is a cleaning robot at Scrubby's dry cleaning shop.

== Episodes ==
The show is formatted into 11-minute episodes. The first season consists of 52 episodes and the second season will consist of 26 episodes.

No.	Title	Written by	Original release date	Prod. code
1	"Milo the Explorer"	Sam Barlow	10 May 2021	TBA
2	"Milo the Reporter"	Sean Carson	11 May 2021	TBA
3	"Milo the Dancer"	Sam Barlow	12 May 2021	TBA
4	"Milo the Doctor"	Sam Barlow	13 May 2021	TBA
5	"Milo the Chef"	Sam Barlow	14 May 2021	TBA
6	"Milo the Cruise Ship Captain"	Chris Parker	17 May 2021	TBA
7	"Milo the Farmer"	Sam Barlow	18 May 2021	TBA
8	"Milo the Mountaineer"	Sean Carson	19 May 2021	TBA
9	"Milo the Footballer"	Sean Carson	20 May 2021	TBA
10	"Milo the Postal Worker"	Sam Barlow	21 May 2021	TBA
11	"Milo the Mechanic"	Chris Parker	24 May 2021	TBA
12	"Milo the Hairdresser"	Chris Parker	25 May 2021	TBA
13	"Milo the Botanist"	Chris Parker	26 May 2021	TBA
14	"Milo the Artist"	Chris Parker	27 May 2021	TBA
15	"Milo the Supermarket Worker"	Chris Parker	28 May 2021	TBA
16	"Milo the Police Officer"	Sam Barlow	13 September 2021	TBA
17	"Milo the Tour Guide"	Sam Barlow	14 September 2021	TBA
18	"Milo the Photographer"	Lisa Akhurst	15 September 2021	TBA
19	"Milo the Librarian"	Gillian Corderoy	16 September 2021	TBA
20	"Milo the Figure Skater"	Liam Farrel	17 September 2021	TBA
21	"Milo the Musician"	Chris Parker	20 September 2021	TBA
22	"Milo the Theatre Actor"	Chris Parker	21 September 2021	TBA
23	"Milo the Judge"	Chris Parker	22 September 2021	TBA
24	"Milo the Racing Car Driver"	Chris Parker	23 September 2021	TBA
25	"Milo the Firefighter"	Chris Parker	24 September 2021	TBA
26	"Milo the Tennis Player"	Sam Barlow	27 September 2021	TBA
27	"Milo the Archaeologist"	Sam Barlow	28 September 2021	TBA
28	"Milo the Clown"	Sam Barlow	29 September 2021	TBA
29	"Milo the Secret Agent"	Sam Barlow	30 September 2021	TBA
30	"Milo the Astronaut"	Sam Barlow	1 October 2021	TBA
31	"Milo the Dentist"	Sam Barlow	14 March 2022	TBA
32	"Milo the Rescue Pilot"	Sam Barlow	15 March 2022	TBA
33	"Milo the Fashion Designer"	Sam Barlow	16 March 2022	TBA
34	"Milo the Teacher"	Sam Barlow	17 March 2022	TBA
35	"Milo the Fisherman"	Sam Barlow	18 March 2022	TBA
36	"Milo the Athlete"	Sam Barlow	21 March 2022	TBA
37	"Milo the Taxi Driver"	Sam Barlow	22 March 2022	TBA
38	"Milo the Gardener"	Sam Barlow	23 March 2022	TBA
39	"Milo the Delivery Driver"	Sam Barlow	24 March 2022	TBA
40	"Milo the Factory Worker"	Sam Barlow	25 March 2022	TBA
41	"Milo the Builder"	Sam Barlow	28 March 2022	TBA
42	"Milo the Baker"	Unknown	29 March 2022	TBA
43	"Milo the Teacher"	Jen Upton	1 July 2022	TBA
44	"Milo the Vet"	Seyi Odusanya	1 July 2022	TBA
45	"Milo the Cleaner"	Sam Barlow	1 July 2022	TBA
46	"Milo the Gardener"	Lisa Akhurst	1 July 2022	TBA
47	"Milo the Lifeguard"	Unknown	4 July 2022	TBA
48	"Milo the Movie Director"	Liam Farrel	4 July 2022	TBA
49	"Milo the Robotics Engineer"	Rebecca Stevens	5 July 2022	TBA
50	"Milo the Paleontologist"	Jen Upton	5 July 2022	TBA
51	"Milo the Florist"	Rebecca Stevens	6 July 2022	TBA
52	"Milo the Decorator"	Sam Barlow	6 July 2022	TBA

== Broadcast ==
The show is broadcast in over 170 countries internationally. It premiered in the United Kingdom on Channel 5's Milkshake! block on 10 May 2021.

From 2021 to 2022, the show began airing in Russia on JimJam, and later on Carousel.

In July 2023, the show began airing in France on 6play and in Mexico on TV Azteca. In August of the same year, it debuted in Canada on Télé-Québec.

In 2024, PBS Kids acquired the rights to the series in the United States. Although it was originally scheduled to air on the PBS Kids 24/7 Channel, it was exclusive to the PBS Kids on-demand streaming service as of May 13 of that same year, in addition to Amazon Prime Video through the PBS Kids add-on subscription. On-air broadcasts began on the PBS Kids 24/7 channel on October 1 in that year.

== Reception ==
Milo is one of the UK's top-rated programs for children between the ages of four and six, reaching one million kids between the ages of four and fifteen in the UK within its first year of broadcast. It won the Best Children's Series at the 2022 British Animation Awards. It also won bronze at the 2022 New York Festivals TV & Film Awards, and was nominated for Best Preschool Program at the 2022 Broadcast Awards.
