= Zaqi Ismail =

English actor

Zaqi Ismail is an English actor of Indian descent.

== Life and career ==
Zaqi Ismail is a 2015 graduate of Rose Bruford College.

In August 2015 he appeared in a stage production entitled This Language at the Camden Fringe and Edinburgh Fringe.

Ismail has an elder sister who is deaf, and is proficient in British Sign Language. In October 2015 he played the character of Lunn, interpreting for deaf crew-leader Cass (Sophie Leigh Stone) in the Doctor Who series 9 two-part story "Under the Lake" / "Before the Flood". He plays Ahsan in We Are Lady Parts.
