= Toby Whithouse =

English actor, screenwriter and playwright (born 1970)

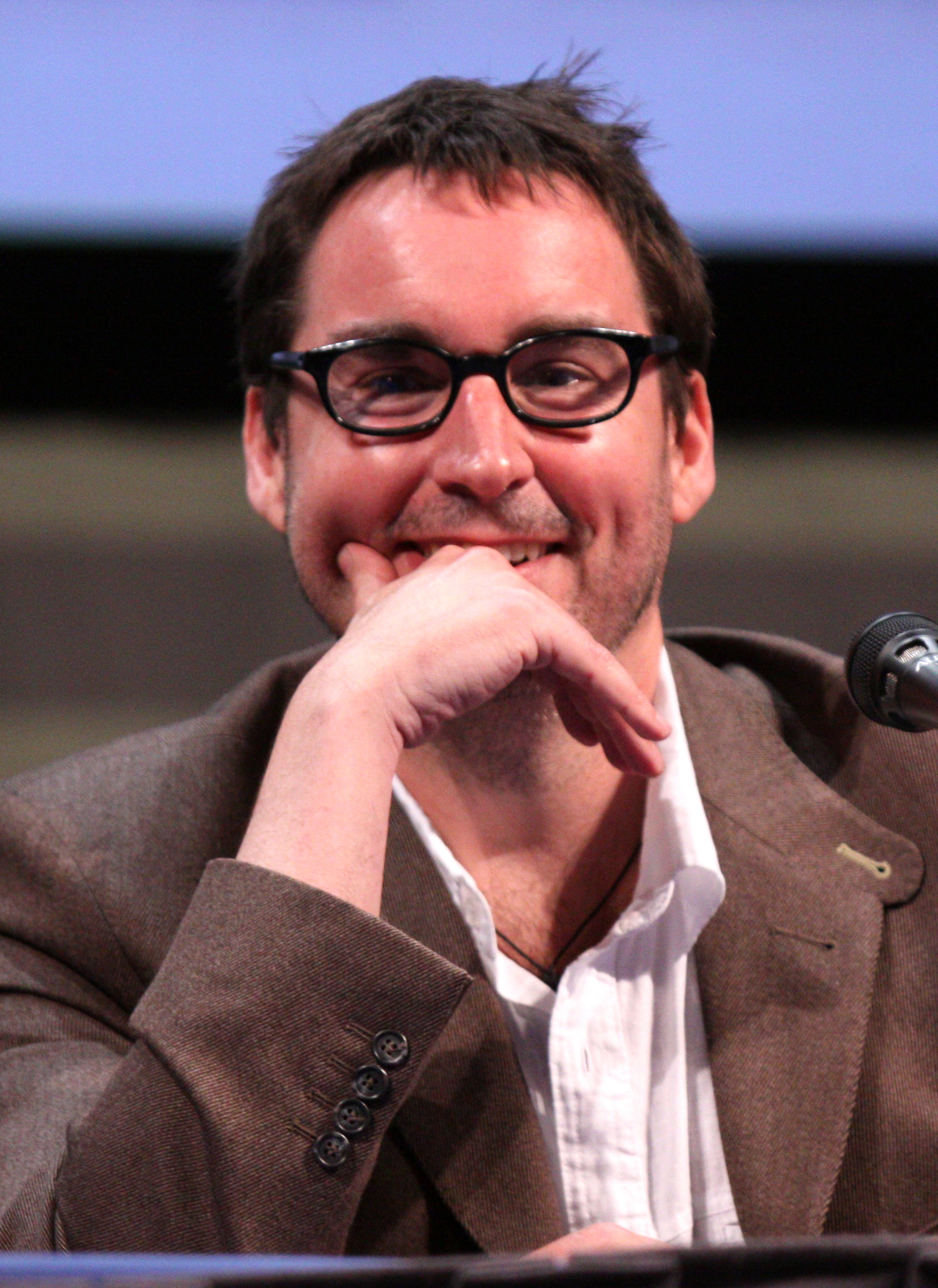
- Whithouse in 2011
- Born: Toby Lawrence Whithouse; 5 July 1970 (age 56); Southend-on-Sea, Essex, England
- Occupations: Actor, screenwriter, playwright
- Years active: 1992–present

Toby Lawrence Whithouse (/ˈwɪthaʊs/; born 5 July 1970) is an English actor, screenwriter and playwright. His highest-profile work has been the creation of the BBC Three supernatural television series Being Human. He also created the Channel 4 television comedy-drama series No Angels, the BBC America/BBC Two espionage drama series The Game and has written seven episodes for BBC One's Doctor Who. His work on Doctor Who was primarily for the Doctors played by Matt Smith and Peter Capaldi.

== Early life ==
After initially attending art college (SEEVIC) in Benfleet to become a book illustrator, Whithouse decided to drop out of the course and turn to acting as a profession, training at the Guildhall School of Music and Drama. He was a regular in the cast of the early 1990s BBC One drama series The House of Eliott and had a small role in the 1993 film Shadowlands. Whithouse also appeared on stage in the West End, co-starring with Gene Wilder in Laughter on the 23rd Floor by Neil Simon in 1997.

== Career ==
=== Acting ===
As an actor, he appeared in the role of Alistair in the film version of Bridget Jones's Diary in 2001. Since then his appearances have been less frequent, although he appeared in a small role in his own episode of Hotel Babylon in February 2006, and made a cameo appearance in the last ever episode of No Angels, transmitted on Channel 4 in April 2006. He also played the Home Secretary in the final series of Being Human in 2013. Whithouse returned to the stage of the Soho Theatre in 2017 in a one-man show as the actor/writer of his play Executioner Number One. Due to his friendship and professional relationship with the departing Doctor Who showrunner Steven Moffat, Whithouse also appeared later that same year in the Twelfth Doctor Peter Capaldi's final episode, "Twice Upon a Time" as a World War I soldier speaking solely in German. In 2025, he reprised his role as Alistair in the fourth Bridget Jones film, Bridget Jones: Mad About the Boy.

Toby Whithouse was also a stand up comedian in the early 2000s, becoming a So You Think You're Funny? finalist in 2007.

=== Writing ===
Frustrated at what he perceived as a lack of quality in many of the scripts he was sent to read, Whithouse took to writing in his spare time between acting roles, eventually writing a play Jump Mr. Malinoff, Jump which won the Verity Bargate Award. The play was performed as the opening production of the Soho Theatre in Dean Street, London. Following this, he gained his first television writing credit by scripting an episode for the ITV drama series Where the Heart Is.

He then became associated with the independent production company World Productions, for whom he worked on the BBC Two drama series Attachments. When Channel 4 approached World with a view to a new drama series commission, the company came up with the idea of a series concerning the lives of four nurses in the North of England, and Whithouse was given the task of fleshing out and formatting the show which became No Angels. The series was a success, running for three series on Channel 4 from 2004 to 2006.

A long-time friend of Doctor Who executive producer Julie Gardner, Whithouse was invited to contribute to the series in 2005, eventually writing the third episode of the second series. "School Reunion", which featured the return of the robot dog K-9 and 1970s companion Sarah Jane Smith, transmitted on 29 April 2006. He went on to write for the Doctor Who spin-off series Torchwood, with his episode – "Greeks Bearing Gifts" – transmitted on 26 November 2006. At the invitation of showrunner Steven Moffat, Whithouse returned to Doctor Who in 2010 and contributed scripts on a regular basis until 2017.

In 2008 the pilot of Being Human, created and written by Whithouse, was shown on BBC Three as part of a viewer trial. Initially it did not become part of BBC's line-up for new commissioned series, but after positive public feedback including a petition for its return, Being Human returned on BBC Three as a 6-part series in early 2009. The first episode debuted on 25 January 2009, and the series went on to run for five seasons before it ended in 2013. Whithouse also created the spinoff Becoming Human.

In November 2012, BBC Cymru Wales announced the commission of Whithouse's 1970s-set spy thriller The Game. The six-part series, starring Tom Hughes and Brian Cox was first broadcast on BBC America in November 2014, then later on BBC Two in April 2015. Whithouse confirmed via Twitter in July 2015 that there would not be a second series, and subsequently remarked in a 2017 interview that The Game "had not been a particularly enjoyable experience".

In April 2018, it was announced that Whithouse would be showrunner on Noughts and Crosses, the BBC One adaptation of the Malorie Blackman novel. Later that same year (in November 2018) came the additional announcement that Neil Gaiman had hired Whithouse to collaborate with him, as the lead writer and Executive Producer on a television adaptation of Mervyn Peake's Gormenghast novels.

A long-time comics fan, Whithouse announced via Twitter in May 2019 that he was collaborating with the comics artist Alan Davis as part of Marvel Comics #1000, a project involving multiple creative team-ups for Marvel Comics which celebrated the history of the company. The Whithouse/Davis piece published in August 2019 was an illustrated text story featuring the 1979 Marvel UK character Night Raven.

In June 2023 it was announced that filming had started on The Red King, a mystery series from Whithouse commissioned by the channel Alibi. The six-part horror-thriller starring Anjli Mohindra and Jill Halfpenny aired in April 2024.

Whithouse helmed a 2025 reboot of the popular 1980s detective series Bergerac.

== Productions ==
=== Television ===
| Production | Notes | Broadcaster |
|---|---|---|
| Where the Heart Is | "Letting Go" (1999) | ITV |
| Attachments | "Flat Management", Series One (2000) | BBC Two |
| No Angels | Series Creator, various episodes (2004–2006) | Channel 4 |
| Hotel Babylon | Series 1, Episode 5 (2006) | BBC One |
| Doctor Who | "School Reunion" (2006); "The Vampires of Venice" (2010); "The God Complex" (2011); "A Town Called Mercy" (2012); "Under the Lake" / "Before the Flood" (2015); "The Lie of the Land" (2017) | BBC One |
| Torchwood | "Greeks Bearing Gifts" (2006) | BBC Three |
| Other People | Pilot episode shown in C4's Comedy Showcase (2007) | Channel 4 |
| Being Human | Series Creator, 17 episodes (2008–2013) | BBC Three |
| Becoming Human | Series Creator, 8 episodes (2011) | BBC Three |
| The Game | Series Creator, 4 of 6 episodes (2014) | BBC Two |
| The Red King | Series Creator (2024) | Alibi |
| Bergerac | Series Creator (2025–present) | U&Drama |

=== Theatre ===
| Production | First Performed | Theatre |
|---|---|---|
| Jump, Mr Malinoff, Jump | 2000 | Soho Theatre |
| Blue Eyes & Heels | 2005 | Soho Theatre |
| Executioner No. 1 | 2017 | Soho Theatre |
