= The God Complex =

222 – "The God Complex"
- Doctor Who episode

Cast
- Doctor: Matt Smith – Eleventh Doctor
- Companions: Karen Gillan – Amy Pond; Arthur Darvill – Rory Williams
- Others: Sarah Quintrell – Lucy Hayward; Amara Karan – Rita; Dimitri Leonidas – Howie Spragg; Daniel Pirrie – Joe Buchanan; David Walliams – Gibbis; Dafydd Emyr – PE Teacher; Spencer Wilding – The Creature; Rashid Karapiet – Rita's Father; Caitlin Blackwood – Amelia Pond; Roger Ennals – Gorilla

Production
- Directed by: Nick Hurran
- Written by: Toby Whithouse
- Produced by: Marcus Wilson
- Executive producers: Steven Moffat; Piers Wenger; Beth Willis
- Music by: Murray Gold
- Production code: 2.11
- Series: Series 6
- Running time: 50 minutes
- First broadcast: 17 September 2011

Chronology
← Preceded by "The Girl Who Waited"	Followed by → "Closing Time"

"The God Complex" is the eleventh episode of the sixth series of the British science fiction television series Doctor Who, first broadcast on BBC One on 17 September 2011. It was written by Toby Whithouse and directed by Nick Hurran.

In the episode, the alien time traveller the Doctor (Matt Smith) and his human companions Amy Pond (Karen Gillan) and Rory Williams (Arthur Darvill) find themselves trapped in what appears to be a 1980s hotel with constantly changing corridors. They meet other humans and an alien who have also appeared in the hotel, without any idea how they arrived. The Doctor learns that each hotel room contains the greatest fear of someone who has been in the hotel, and that a Minotaur-like creature (played by Spencer Wilding) is feeding off their faith.

Whithouse originally developed the concept of "The God Complex" for the previous series, but due to it being similar to episodes in that series, it was pushed back, with Whithouse contributing "The Vampires of Venice" instead. The episode ends with the departure of Amy and Rory, though this was not a permanent exit. "The God Complex" was filmed during the early months of 2011, mainly on sets constructed for the hotel. The episode was seen by 6.77 million viewers in the United Kingdom and received generally positive reviews from critics. While the performances in the episode, especially Smith's, were praised, not all critics were impressed with the plot.

== Plot ==
=== Synopsis ===
The Eleventh Doctor, Amy and Rory arrive on an alien structure in space disguised as a 1980s Earth hotel. An alien Minotaur-like creature is in the hotel that consumes everyone who has been trapped here and is itself a prisoner who is in pain and wishes to end its life. It entices its trapped victims to enter one of the many rooms in the hotel which contain illusions of their greatest fears, upon which they become brainwashed to "praise him" and allow themselves to be taken. The hotel is inescapable and its halls and rooms can change on a whim. The Doctor, Amy and Rory soon find the TARDIS has also disappeared, and the Doctor warns them from opening any door they are drawn to, for fear of being possessed. Joe, Howie and Rita — humans that have been taken out of their routine lives by this prison's automated systems to feed the creature — are possessed by the creature and killed. While exploring more of the hotel, both Amy and the Doctor are separately lured to look into two specific rooms, facing their own fears.

The Doctor surmises the hotel and its rooms were, by design, meant to make the victims fall back on their faith by scaring them to allow the creature to possess them. The Doctor realises that it is Amy's trust in him that is being challenged; it is that faith that brought them to the hotel in the first place. Amy soon becomes possessed like the others. As the creature comes for Amy, the Doctor and the others grab her and take her to the room she opened previously. Inside, they find the illusion of young Amy, Amelia, waiting for the Doctor to return. The Doctor asserts to Amy that he is not a hero to break her blind trust in him; once this is done, the creature outside the door collapses on the floor. As they watch, the hotel is revealed to be part of a large simulation. The Doctor finds his TARDIS nearby. Gibbis, a survivor of the creature, asks for a lift home and the Doctor then takes Amy and Rory to London, believing it best for the two to stop travelling with him before they end up getting killed.

=== Continuity ===
Several references to past Doctor Who species are displayed throughout the wall of photos of the past victims of the beast, including a Sontaran, a Judoon, a Catkind Sister of Plenitude, and a Tritovore ("Planet of the Dead"). The Doctor identifies the beast as being from a species that is distantly related to the Nimon, previously a foe in the serial The Horns of Nimon (1979–80); and the group witnesses two illusions of Weeping Angels, from the episodes "Blink", "The Time of Angels", and "Flesh and Stone". Though the audience is not shown the contents of the room (numbered 11) that the Doctor is lured to open, the sound of the TARDIS' cloister bell can be heard. Young Amelia is shown waiting for her "raggedy Doctor" to return from the episode "The Eleventh Hour." The Doctor, being forced to break Amy's faith in him, echoes a previous event in The Curse of Fenric (1989) where the Seventh Doctor is forced to break Ace's faith in him. In "The Time of the Doctor", it is revealed that what the Doctor saw in Room 11 was the crack in reality that dominated his first series.

The episode also introduces the Tivolians, a race of cowardly aliens who survive by docilely allowing themselves to be conquered by other species on a regular basis. Whithouse's series 9 episodes "Under the Lake" and "Before the Flood" feature another Tivolian named Prentis, portrayed by Paul Kaye.

== Production ==
=== Writing ===
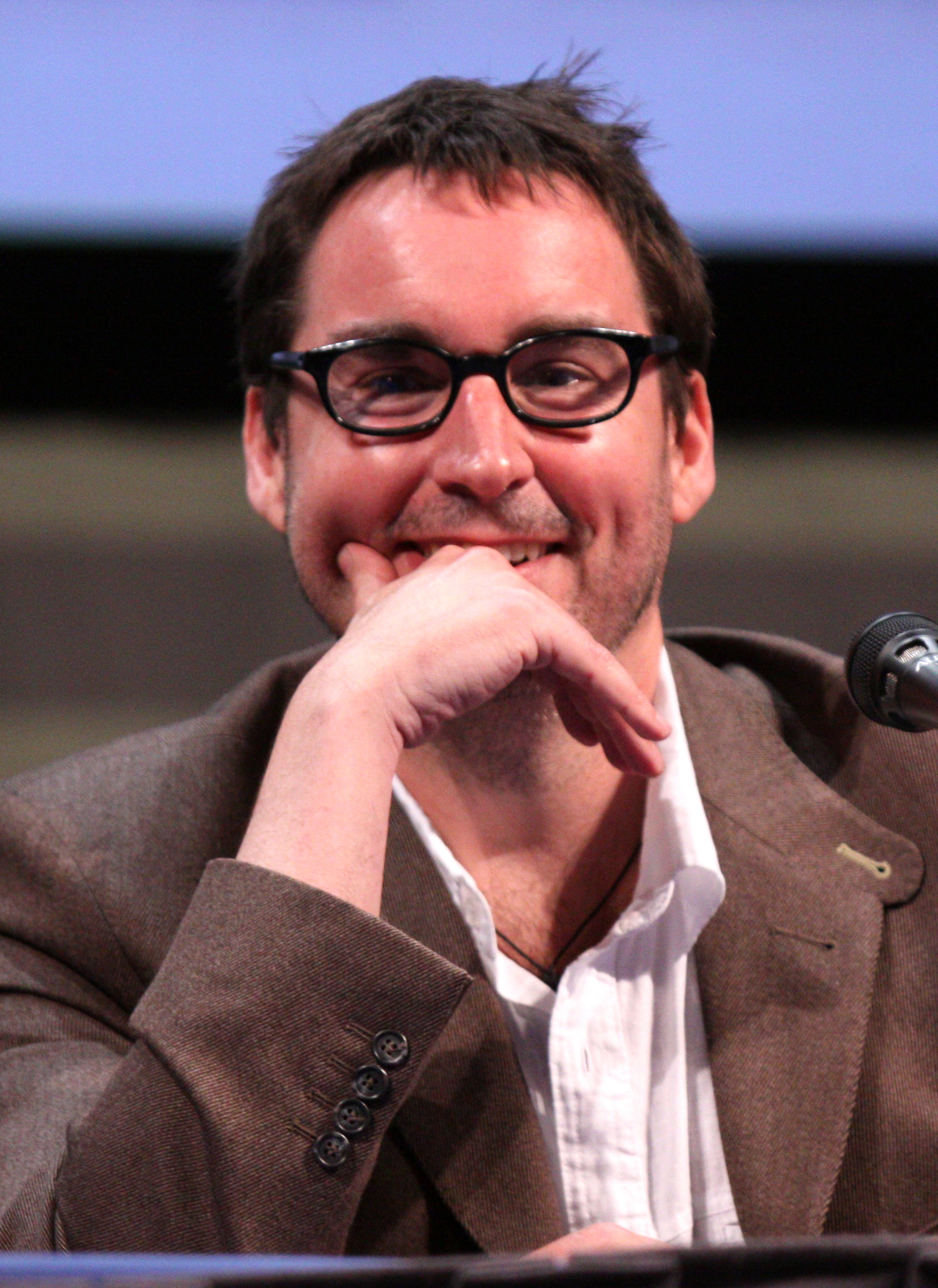
The episode was written by Toby Whithouse, who originally planned to write it for the previous series.

Showrunner Steven Moffat originally pitched the idea of a hotel with shifting rooms to writer Toby Whithouse for the previous series. However, as production continued, Moffat thought that there were too many instances in which the characters were running through corridors in that series, so Whithouse wrote "The Vampires of Venice" instead and "The God Complex" was pushed to the next series. The idea to have a Minotaur be the monster came from Whithouse's love for Greek mythology. Whithouse was more pleased with "The God Complex" than "School Reunion" and "The Vampires of Venice", his previous Doctor Who scripts, as the tone was darker which he was "more comfortable" writing.

The first line of dialogue Whithouse wrote was the Doctor's translation of the Minotaur's words: "An ancient creature, drenched in the blood of the innocent, drifting in space through an endless shifting maze. For such a creature, death would be a gift". The Minotaur then tells the Doctor he was not talking about himself, but rather the Doctor. This is foreshadowing of the upcoming event of the Doctor's death, the story arc of the series. Amy and Rory's departure in the episode was only temporary; they return for the series finale, "The Wedding of River Song" and appear briefly at the end of the 2011 Christmas Special. They permanently leave in the fifth episode of the seventh series.

=== Filming and costumes ===
The read-through for "The God Complex" took place in February 2011. It was then filmed mainly on hotel sets constructed in the studio. The Doctor, Amy, and Rory's first encounter with a fear in the hotel is the ventriloquist dummies found in Joe's room; Whithouse wanted to include something "big and bold" and noted that there was "something macabre about ventriloquist dummies". Many members of the crew were brought in to operate the dummies, most of them having to lie underneath them on the floor. The actor who portrayed the Minotaur, Spencer Wilding, is six foot seven inches tall. Wilding received a costume fitting in early 2011, after which the suit was dressed up with paint and fur.

David Walliams was asked to guest-star in the episode in an email and he agreed, having been a fan of the show. He had previously appeared in the Fifth Doctor audio drama Phantasmagoria where he played two separate characters. Matt Smith called his co-star "hilarious" and found it hard to take him seriously, as when he was in his prosthetics for the part he resembled a giant mole. The prosthetics took about two hours to apply. Walliams felt the make-up was not limiting to his acting, finding it "quite expressive".

== Outside references ==
The hotel and setting has been compared to Stanley Kubrick's film The Shining, using similar composition such as long corridor shots and odd angles. Critics also observed that the episode drew inspiration from George Orwell's novel Nineteen Eighty-Four, particularly in the concept of rooms (or, in Orwell's case, Room 101) containing each person's deepest fear. Joe also quotes the old English nursery rhyme "Oranges and Lemons", singing "Here comes a candle to light you to bed, here comes a chopper to chop off your head!".

== Broadcast and reception ==
"The God Complex" was first broadcast in the United Kingdom on BBC One on 17 September 2011 and on the same date in the United States on BBC America. Overnight ratings showed that 5.2 million viewers watched the episode on BBC One, beaten by direct competitor All-Star Family Fortunes on ITV1. This made Doctor Who third for the night behind The X Factor and Family Fortunes. The episode was ranked number 1 on BBC's iPlayer the day after it aired service and was also popular on social networking site Twitter, where the phrase "Amy and Rory" trended the night it aired. When the final consolidated figures were calculated, an additional 1.57 million time-shifted viewers were added, bringing the total up to 6.77 million. With these figures it beat Family Fortunes, which achieved a consolidated rating of only 5.39 million viewers. The episode also received attention on BBC's online iPlayer, where it placed fourth for the month of September. It was given an Appreciation Index of 86, considered "excellent".

=== Critical reception ===
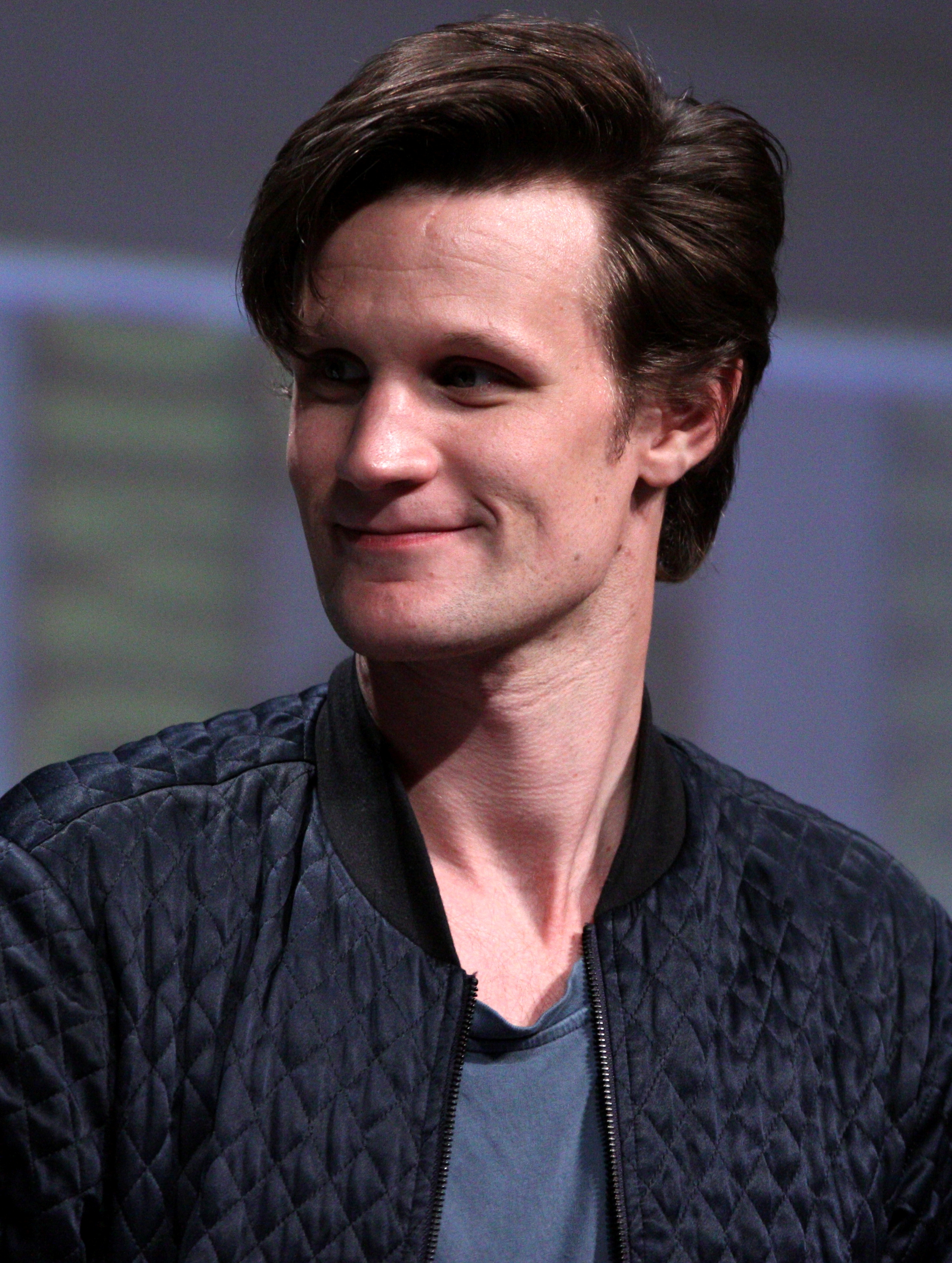
Matt Smith received acclaim for his performance as the Doctor in "The God Complex".

The episode received generally positive reviews from critics. Radio Times reviewer Patrick Mulkern called Whithouse's script "clever and original" and Walliams "endearing" as Gibbis, believing it was another entry into the series' "fabulous" stand-alone episodes. io9's Charlie Jane Anders was also positive, especially of the way the Doctor's character was explored through his overconfidence making others believe in him instead of themselves and praising Smith's performance. Keith Phipps of The A.V. Club gave the episode a B+, praising the guest stars and the way the Doctor's character was explored. Neela Debnath, writing for The Independent, also gave a positive review, praising the creepiness, Amara Karan and Dimitri Leonidas' performances, and the sadness in the ending. However, she was surprised that Amy accepted the Doctor would be leaving her despite her wanting to find her child as seen earlier in the series.

Dan Martin of The Guardian praised the exits of Amy and Rory and highlighted Karen Gillan and Smith's performance, noting how more of his dark side is shown. Of the plot, he stated that it was "funny and thoughtful" but felt "like a runaround bolted on to make way for the ending". Martin later rated it the fifth best episode of the series, though the finale was not included in the list. Digital Spy's Morgan Jeffery wrote that Nick Hurran "excelled" in directing and that the episode worked "incredibly well" on an emotional level. However, he felt it did not succeed as well in terms of plot, citing the "thin explanation" for the happenings. Gavin Fuller of The Daily Telegraph awarded the episode three and a half out of five stars, stating that "the surreal tone to the episode... helped camouflage the fact that the plot made very little sense". However, he praised the cast's "impressive performances", especially Smith's.

Dave Golder of SFX also gave "The God Complex" three and a half out of five stars, questioning some logical aspects but noting that it was "extremely witty, particularly when it comes to David Walliams's cowardly moleman Gibbis". He also did not believe Amy and Rory would be gone for long, especially as the Doctor had placed them in more perilous situations before. IGN's Matt Risely rated the episode 7 out of 10, calling it "a notably wonky episode, both in terms of tone and plot development" that came off as "a confused, slightly ill-fitting hodgepodge of a tale". While he praised Hurran's directing and the performances of Walliams and Karan, he felt the characters were sidelined near the end. Risely noted that "things certainly chugged along with a witty, sparkling vibrancy at least early on", but the tone "lost its way halfway through" culminating in a "hollow and rushed" final scene where he left Amy and Rory.

A critical monograph on the episode by Paul Driscoll was published in 2017 as part of Obverse Books's Black Archive range. Driscoll analyses the story in terms of three key influences—the Theseus myth, Nineteen Eighty-Four and The Shining, as well as its understanding of fear and faith. He concludes that the Doctor's realisation of his own "god complex" is a crucial turning-point in his character arc and his relationship with his companions.

=== David Walliams controversy ===
On 10 November 2026, the episode was removed from BBC iPlayer after The Guardian and ITV News published an investigation into allegations of sexual misconduct and grooming against guest star David Walliams.
