= The City of Lost Children (video game) =

1997 video game

- Developer: Psygnosis
- Publisher: Psygnosis
- Director: Denis Friedman
- Producer: Carole Faure
- Writer: Nicolas Meylaender
- Composer: Francis Gorgé
- Platforms: MS-DOS; PlayStation
- Release: MS-DOS: NA: 2 April 1997; EU: 1997; PlayStation: NA: 20 May 1997; EU: 1 June 1997; JP: 15 January 1998
- Genre: Adventure
- Mode: Single-player

The City of Lost Children (Note: Also known as Lost Children: The City of Lost Children (Japanese: ロストチルドレン: 失われた子供たちの街, Hepburn: Rosuto Chirudoren: Ushinawareta Kodomo-Tachi No Machi) in Japan.) is an adventure game developed and published by Psygnosis in 1997. It is loosely based on the film of the same name. The game was released for the PlayStation and MS-DOS. The latter is a straight port of the console version. Players take on the role of the film character Miette.

== Gameplay ==
The City of Lost Children is an adventure game loosely based on the 1995 film of the same name directed by Jean-Pierre Jeunet and Marc Caro. The player controls 12-year-old Miette in pre-rendered 3D environments similar to those of Resident Evil and Alone in the Dark.

== Reception ==
Reception

Aggregate score
Aggregator	Score
GameRankings	60% (PC); 54.50% (PS)

Review scores
Publication	Score
AllGame	2/5 (PC); 1.5/5 (PS)
Edge	4 out of 10 (PS)
Electronic Gaming Monthly	6.125 out of 10 (PS)
Game Informer	5.5 out of 10 (PS)
GameSpot	4.6 out of 10 (PC); 3.8 out of 10 (PS)
Hyper	84% (PC)
IGN	5 out of 10 (PS)
Next Generation	2/5 (PC)
PC Gamer (US)	48%
PC Zone	84%

On GameRankings the PC version holds a score of 60% based on three reviews, while the PlayStation version holds a score of 54.50% based on four reviews.

The game received mediocre reviews. Reviewers generally remarked that the graphics are stunningly beautiful and atmospheric, but criticized the excessive difficulty of finding objects and the slow pace. A Next Generation critic explained, "To pick up an item, you must stand directly on top of it, a problem when most of the important objects aren't out in plain sight. You'll find yourself looking in every nook and cranny just to make sure you didn't miss something. Even then, the vast majority of items are found almost by accident ..." Josh Smith of GameSpot further remarked, "The game's puzzles are arbitrary and not particularly intuitive. Trade the marbles for a sleeping potion? Go figure. Put a bone in a cash register to short out the security system on a safe? Come on. The lack of deduction required by the game encourages the kind of random gameplay that can only be described as frustrating. Solutions to puzzles rarely yield a sense of accomplishment since more often than not they are solved through happenstance, not reasoning."

Shawn Smith and Sushi-X of Electronic Gaming Monthly had a somewhat more positive reaction; though they noted the same key flaws as other critics, they focused more on how well the game recreated the world of the film, with Smith commenting, "The cinemas are done well, and the rendered city gives the impression of really being in [a] dirty, semi-futuristic alternate reality." However, their co-reviewers Dan Hsu and Crispin Boyer called it "A unique game that masochists should check out" and "heavy on atmosphere but lean on fun", respectively. GamePro's The Rookie concluded, "If you're determined to play, take an evening to rent both the movie and the game to see which goes first, your eyesight or your sanity."
