= Sophie Leigh Stone =

British actress

- Born: 11 August 1980 (age 46)
- Education: Mary Hare Grammar School for the Deaf; RADA
- Occupation: actress
- Children: 2
- Father: Martin Stone

Sophie Leigh Stone (born 1980 or 1981) is an English stage and television actress. She was the first deaf student to win a place at the British drama school Royal Academy of Dramatic Art (RADA). She is best known for her roles as Louise in Two Doors Down and as Cass in Doctor Who. In 2022, she joined the cast of the new Acorn TV detective series The Chelsea Detective, playing the forensics officer Ashley Wilton. She continued to play that role in season 4 in 2026.

== Early life and education ==
Sophie Leigh Stone was born in 1980 or 1981 to Ruth Bullock, a painter, and guitarist Martin Stone. She has been deaf since birth, and grew up in East London. She attended Mary Hare Grammar School for the Deaf.

Stone took up a place at RADA after the birth of her two children (to whom she is a single mother), with the extra cost of her studies being supported by the Snowdon Trust.

== Career ==
Since graduating, Stone has played the role of Kattrin in Mother Courage and Her Children at the National Theatre and worked with other theatre companies.

In Spring 2014, she played Agnetha in Bryony Lavery's play Frozen, opening at the Birmingham Repertory Theatre.

In Autumn 2014, she took the leading role in the touring production of Woman of Flowers, a reworking of the Welsh myth of Blodeuwedd by playwright Kaite O'Reilly.

She has also appeared in episodes of several British television series and short films.

In 2015, she played the role of deaf crew-leader Cass in the Doctor Who episodes "Under the Lake" and "Before the Flood", who communicated entirely in British Sign Language. She was cast as Princess Alice of Battenberg, Prince Philip's mother, who was deaf herself, in Series 2 of Netflix historical drama The Crown. In 2021 she played the lead in an episode of the BBC 1 anthology series Jimmy McGovern's Moving On.

In 2009, she played in Coming Home, directed by the deaf director Louis Neethling. She played the deaf poet and activist Dorothy Miles in the docu-drama "Dot" in 2019.

She appeared with actress Vilma Jackson in the short Sign Night, which was broadcast on the BBC.

In 2020, she added radio to her credits, by being cast in a BBC Radio 3 drama Beethoven Can Hear You as a deaf traveller from the future that visits Beethoven (played by Peter Capaldi). She also wrote and spoke an essay about her relationship with music. This was part of the celebration for the 250th anniversary of Beethoven's birth.

In 2013, she co-founded the DH Ensemble Theatre Company, which creates plays that include deaf and hearing actors. She is also an associate artist for the Watermill Theatre, and in 2021 she guest-edited an anthology of Deaf authors for Arachne Press.

In 2022, she joined the cast of the new Acorn TV program, The Chelsea Detective. She played the forensics officer Ashley Wilton, a role she continued to play in the fourth series of the show, in 2026.

== Credits ==
=== Film ===
Year	Title	Role	Notes
2009	Caniformia	One of 'The Table of Dining Hipsters'	Short films
2012	Confession	Mabel	Short films
2013	Retreat	Isobel	Short film. Best Actress Award, Clin d'Oeil Festival
2017	Intimacy	Debbie	Short films
2019	Happiness	Sarah	Short films
2020	Sign Night	Ghost 1	Short films
TBA	Retreat	TBA	Feature film

=== Television ===
Year	Title	Role	Notes
2003	Casualty	Kirsty Harmon	Series 18; Episode 7: "Can't Let Go"
2009	FM	Poppy	Episode 3: "Return to Sender"
2009	Coming Home	Kate	Television film
2011	Marchlands	Olive Runcie	Mini-series; Episodes 1–4
2011	Holby City	Jade Ashdown	Series 13; Episode 14: "My Hero"
2013	Holby City	Kara Shotton	Series 16; Episode 3: "Flesh Is Weak"
2013	Midsomer Murders	Fay Bell	Series 15; Episode 5: "The Sicilian Defence"
2014	Mapp & Lucia	Hotel Clerk	Mini-series; Episode 1
2014–2016	Small World	Laura	Episodes 1–5
2015	Doctor Who	Cass	Series 9; Episodes 3 & 4: "Under the Lake" and "Before the Flood"
2016	The Moonstone	Lucy Yolland	Mini-series; Episodes 2 & 3
2017	The Crown	Princess Alice of Battenberg	Series 2; Episodes 2 & 9: "A Company of Men" and "Paterfamilias"
2018	Dot	Dot (Middle years)	Television film
2018	Shetland	Jo Halley	Series 4; Episodes 1–5
2019	Shakespeare & Hathaway: Private Investigators	Katie Harper	Series 2; Episode 2: "The Play's the Thing"
2019, 2022	Two Doors Down	Louise	Series 4; Episode 6: "Housewarming", and Series 6; Episode 6: "Garden Party"
2020, 2021	Casualty	Susie Ashby	Series 34; Episode 36, and Series 36; Episode 5: "The Road Less Travelled"
2021	This Way Up	Julie	Series 2; Episodes 1–4
2021	Moving On	Rosie Pearce	Series 12; Episode 5: "More Than Words"
2022 –Present	The Chelsea Detective	Ashley Wilton	Series 1–3; 12 episodes
2023	Midsomer Murders	Gill Templeton	Series 23; Episode 4: "Dressed to Kill"
2025	Reunion	Naomi Brennan	Mini-series; Episodes 1–4

=== Theatre ===
Year	Title	Role	Company
2009	Mother Courage and Her Children	Kattrin	National Theatre
2012	In Water I’m Weightless		National Theatre of Wales
2014	Woman of Flowers		Forest Forge / UK Tour
2016	The Government Inspector	Postmaster	Birmingham Rep / UK Tour
2018	A Midsummer Night's Dream	Hermia	Watermill Theatre
2018	As You Like It	Jaques	Shakespeare's Globe
2018	Jubilee	Bod	Lyric, Hammersmith / Manchester Royal Exchange
2019	Emilia		Shakespeare's Globe / West End
2020	The Beauty Parade		Wales Millennium Centre
2021	The Curious Incident of the Dog in the Night-Time	Judy & Ensemble	Troubadour Wembley Park Theatre / UK Tour
2026	The Cherry Orchard	Sharlotta	RSC Swan Theatre
