= Lifeforce Tenka =

1997 video game

Lifeforce Tenka Codename: Tenka
- European PlayStation box art
- Developer: Psygnosis
- Publisher: Psygnosis
- Platforms: PlayStation, Windows
- Release: PlayStation: NA: June 1997; EU: 10 July 1997; Windows: EU: 1997
- Genre: First-person shooter
- Mode: Single-player

Lifeforce Tenka (known as Codename: Tenka in the US) is a 1997 first-person shooter video game developed and published by Psygnosis for the PlayStation and Microsoft Windows. It is also known as just Tenka in some other forms of release. The game is set in a futuristic action environment as the player character engages in battle with a number of various armed flying robots, stationary turrets, and bipedal creatures.

== Plot ==
Lifeforce Tenka takes place in a future where a multinational conglomerate, Trojan Incorporated, is in the process of performing presumably unethical genetic experiments. Joseph D. Tenka, the protagonist, discovers the corporation's nefarious activities and sets about bringing them and their genetically engineered army down.

== Gameplay ==
The weapon design differs from similar games of the time in that instead of the player character acquiring stronger more powerful weapons to add to an accumulated arsenal, weapon modifications are picked up and added to the same weapon (known as the "Self-Generating Polymorphic armoury", or SG-26) and switched between as necessary.

== Development ==
Development on the game began in earnest in January 1995. The graphics in the game were created using Softimage 3D. With Softimage as the construction tool, the programmers additionally wrote a suite of custom Softimage scene extraction utilities. Since the PlayStation cannot perform perspective correct texture mapping, what senior programmer Martin Linklater called "a dynamic multistage clipping and meshing system" was incorporated in Lifeforce Tenka's graphics engine in order to reduce the effect of warping textures.

The development team opted to make the game single-player only. Linklater explained: "The current design for the game does not lend itself to a two-player game. We have chosen to concentrate on a single-player game - which would be the most played version anyway".

== Reception ==
Reception

Review scores
Publication	Score
AllGame	4/5
Edge	7/10
Electronic Gaming Monthly	5.675/10 (Note: Four critics of Electronic Gaming Monthly gave the PlayStation version each a score of 6/10, 4/10, 7/10, and 5.5/10 in an early review.)
Game Informer	8.25/10
GameFan	86% (Note: In GameFan's viewpoint of the PlayStation version's European import, three critics gave it each a score of 89, 88, and 80.)
GameSpot	6.1/10
GameStar	(PC) 26%
Hyper	88%
IGN	7/10
Mega Fun	85%
Next Generation	3/5
The Sydney Morning Herald	3.5/5

The PlayStation version received above-average reviews. Many magazines, including Game Informer, gave it positive to mixed reviews while the game was still in development. Critics deemed the graphics technically impressive due to the lighting effects and polygonal enemies, but some found them overly dark, making most of the levels appear the same. Most also stated that the game simply did not offer enough new gameplay elements to make it stand out from previous first person shooters. However, GamePro's Atomic Dawg opined in an early review that the unintuitive controls for strafing and looking up and down are the game's weak point, and the familiarity of the gameplay is actually what saves it from mediocrity: "...just when you feel like swearing, some ugly mutant charges you, and the ensuing adrenaline rush reminds you why you play video games. Tenka is trigger-happy fun." (Note: GamePro gave the PlayStation version two 4.5/5 scores for graphics and sound, 3.5/5 for control, and 4/5 for fun factor in an early review.) In addition, critics universally praised the bizarre and often gruesome enemy designs. Crispin Boyer of Electronic Gaming Monthly stated in an early review that "the spider-head bad guys will give you nightmares", though he and his three co-reviewers said the game overall lacks excitement and variety. A Next Generation critic similarly remarked in an early review: "Occasionally intense, Tenka's gameplay is solid but never frantically drives the player forward the way the best first-person shooters do." IGN's early review looked at it more optimistically, concluding: "At its heart, Tenka is a good, solid shooter. It won't knock Doom off its throne, but it is strong enough to contend." Glenn Rubenstein of GameSpot judged that though Lifeforce Tenka was one of the better first-person shooters on the market, its high difficulty level and lack of innovation would make it unappealing to all but fans of the genre.
